= First Tung government =

1997–2002 administration of Hong Kong

First Tung Chee-hwa Government
- 1st Government of the Hong Kong; Special Administrative Region

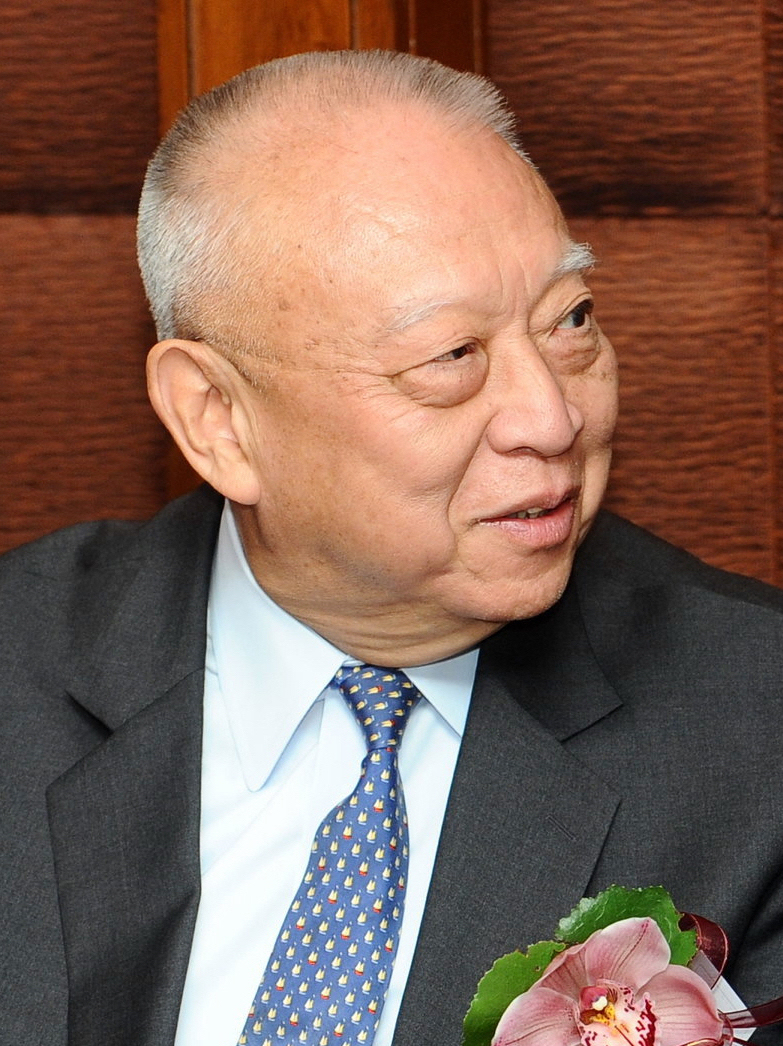
- Date formed: 1 July 1997
- Date dissolved: 30 June 2002

People and organisations
- Head of state: Jiang Zemin
- Head of government: Tung Chee-hwa
- No. of ministers: 18
- Member parties: DAB, LP
- Status in legislature: Pro-Beijing majority
- Opposition party: Pro-democracy camp

History
- Election: 1996 Chief Executive election
- Legislature terms: 1st Legislative Council; 2nd Legislative Council
- Predecessor: Patten government
- Successor: Second Tung government

The First term of Tung Chee-hwa as Chief Executive of Hong Kong, officially considered part of "The 1st term Chief Executive of Hong Kong", relates to the period of governance of Hong Kong since the transfer of sovereignty over Hong Kong, between 1 July 1997 and 30 June 2002. Tung Chee-hwa was elected in 1996 by 400-member Selection Committee as the first Chief Executive of Hong Kong.

== Election ==
Tung Chee-hwa was elected in 1996 by 400-member Selection Committee as the first Chief Executive of Hong Kong. Tung beat former Chief Justice of the Supreme Court of Hong Kong Ti-liang Yang and tycoon Peter Woo with 320 votes.

== Cabinet ==
=== Ministry ===
The policy bureaux were under several reorganisations during the term as following:

- Broadcasting, Culture and Sport Bureau was replaced by Information Technology and Broadcast Bureau on 1 April 1998 and
- Health and Welfare Bureau and Planning, Environment and Lands Bureau transformed into Environment and Health Bureau and Planning and Lands Bureau on 1 January 2000.

Notable change in office was the Chief Secretary Anson Chan resigned and stepped down on 30 April 2001. The post was taken by Financial Secretary Donald Tsang.

Cabinet members
Portfolio	Minister	Took office	Left office	Party
Chief Executive	Tung Chee-hwa	1 July 1997	Tung II	Nonpartisan
Chief Secretary for Administration	Anson Chan	1 July 1997	30 April 2001	Nonpartisan
Chief Secretary for Administration	Donald Tsang	1 May 2002	Tung II	Nonpartisan
Financial Secretary	Donald Tsang	1 July 1997	30 April 2001	Nonpartisan
Financial Secretary	Antony Leung	1 May 2001	Tung II	Nonpartisan
Secretary for Justice	Elsie Leung	1 July 1997	Tung II	Nonpartisan
Secretary for Broadcasting, Culture and Sport	Chau Tak-hay	1 July 1997	30 March 1998	Nonpartisan
Secretary for the Civil Service	Lam Woon-kwong	1 July 1997	31 July 2000	Nonpartisan
Secretary for the Civil Service	Joseph Wong	1 August 2000	30 June 2002	Nonpartisan
Secretary for Commerce and Industry	Denise Yue	1 July 1997	March 1998	Nonpartisan
Secretary for Commerce and Industry	Chau Tak-hay	31 March 1998	30 June 2002	Nonpartisan
Secretary for Constitutional Affairs	Michael Suen	1 July 1997	30 June 2002	Nonpartisan
Secretary for Economic Services	Stephen Ip	1 July 1997	12 June 2000	Nonpartisan
Secretary for Economic Services	Sandra Lee	13 July 2000	30 June 2002	Nonpartisan
Secretary for Education and Manpower	Joseph Wong	1 July 1997	3 July 2000	Nonpartisan
Secretary for Education and Manpower	Fanny Law	3 July 2000	30 June 2002	Nonpartisan
Secretary for Environment and Food	Lily Yam	1 January 2000	30 June 2002	Nonpartisan
Secretary for Financial Services	Rafael Hui	1 July 1997	31 May 2000	Nonpartisan
Secretary for Financial Services	Stephen Ip	13 June 2000	30 June 2002	Nonpartisan
Secretary for Health and Welfare	Katherine Fok	1 July 1997	19 September 1999	Nonpartisan
Secretary for Health and Welfare	Yeoh Eng-kiong	20 September 1999	Tung II	Nonpartisan
Secretary for Home Affairs	David Lan	1 July 1997	9 July 2000	Nonpartisan
Secretary for Home Affairs	Lam Woon-kwong	10 July 2000	30 June 2002	Nonpartisan
Secretary for Housing	Dominic Wong	1 July 1997	30 June 2002	Nonpartisan
Secretary for Information Technology and Broadcasting	Kwong Ki-chi	April 1998	June 2000	Nonpartisan
Secretary for Information Technology and Broadcasting	Carrie Yau	1 July 2000	30 June 2002	Nonpartisan
Secretary for Security	Peter Lai	1 July 1997	30 August 1998	Nonpartisan
Secretary for Security	Regina Ip	31 August 1998	Tung II	Nonpartisan
Secretary for Transport	Gordon Siu	1 July 1997	4 August 1997	Nonpartisan
Secretary for Transport	Nicholas Ng	4 August 1997	1 April 2002	Nonpartisan
Secretary for Treasury	Kwong Ki-chi	1 July 1997	31 March 1998	Nonpartisan
Secretary for Treasury	Denise Yue	1 April 1998	30 June 2002	Nonpartisan
Secretary for Planning, Environment and Lands	Bowen Leung	1 July 1997	4 November 1998	Nonpartisan
Secretary for Planning, Environment and Lands	Gordon Siu	21 January 1999	31 December 1999	Nonpartisan
Secretary for Planning and Lands	Gordon Siu	1 July 1997	30 June 2001	Nonpartisan
Secretary for Planning and Lands	John Tsang	16 July 2001	30 June 2002	Nonpartisan
Secretary for Works	Kwong Hon-sang	1 July 1997	7 August 1998	Nonpartisan
Secretary for Works	Lee Shing-see	7 August 1998	30 June 2002	Nonpartisan

=== Executive Council members ===
The Executive Council was presided by President Tung Chee-hwa and consisted of total 14 members: three official members including Chief Secretary, Financial Secretary and Secretary for Justice and 11 non-official members. All members are appointed by the Chief Executive from among members of the Legislative Council and other influential public personnels.

The Convenor of the non-official members was Chung Sze-yuen until his retirement on 30 June 1999. The title was succeeded by Leung Chun-ying.

Antony Leung became the official member of the ExCo on 30 April 2001 when he took the Financial Secretary post.

Members	Affiliation	Portfolio	Took Office	Left Office	Ref
Chung Sze-yuen	Nonpartisan	Non-official Convenor of the ExCo (1997–99); Former Senior Unofficial Member of ExCo & LegCo	1 July 1997	30 June 1999	
Yang Ti-liang	Nonpartisan	Former Chief Judge of Hong Kong	1 July 1997	30 June 2002	
CY Leung	Nonpartisan	Non-official Convenor of the ExCo (1999–2011); Chartered surveyor	1 July 1997	Tung II	
Nellie Fong	Nonpartisan	Accountant	1 July 1997	30 June 2002	
Rosanna Wong	Nonpartisan	Chairwoman of Housing Authority	1 July 1997	30 June 2002	
Tam Yiu-chung	DAB	Legislative Councillor	1 July 1997	30 June 2002	
Raymond Chien	Nonpartisan	Director of HSBC and Wharf	1 July 1997	30 June 2002	
Charles Lee	Nonpartisan	Chairman of HKEx	1 July 1997	30 June 2002	
Henry Tang	Liberal	Provisional Legislative Councillor	1 July 1997	30 June 2002	
Antony Leung	Nonpartisan	Chairman of Education Commission	1 July 1997	30 April 2001	
Chung Shui-ming	Nonpartisan	Chairman of Housing Society	1 July 1997	30 June 2002	

== See also ==
- Second term of Tung Chee-hwa as Chief Executive of Hong Kong

Preceded by Patten as Governor of Hong Kong	Government of Hong Kong; 1997–2002	Succeeded by Tung II
