= Secretary for Planning and Lands =

Hong Kong ministerial office

The Secretary for Planning and Lands (Chinese: 規劃地政局局長) was a ministerial position in the Hong Kong Government, responsible for urban planning policy and the management and selling of public lands. The position was created on 1 January 2000 to take over some duties of Secretary for Planning, Environment and Lands, and was abolished in 2002 after merging with Secretary for Housing to become Secretary for Housing, Planning and Lands.

No.	Portrait	Name	Term of office		Duration	Chief Executive	Term	Ref
1		Gordon Siu Kwing-chue 蕭炯柱	1 January 2000	30 June 2001	180 days	Tung Chee-hwa (1997–2005)	1	
2		John Tsang Chun-wah 曾俊華	16 July 2001	30 June 2002	349 days	Tung Chee-hwa (1997–2005)	1	
