= Carrie Lam =

Chief Executive of Hong Kong from 2017 to 2022

The Honourable Carrie Lam GBM GBS JP
- 林鄭月娥
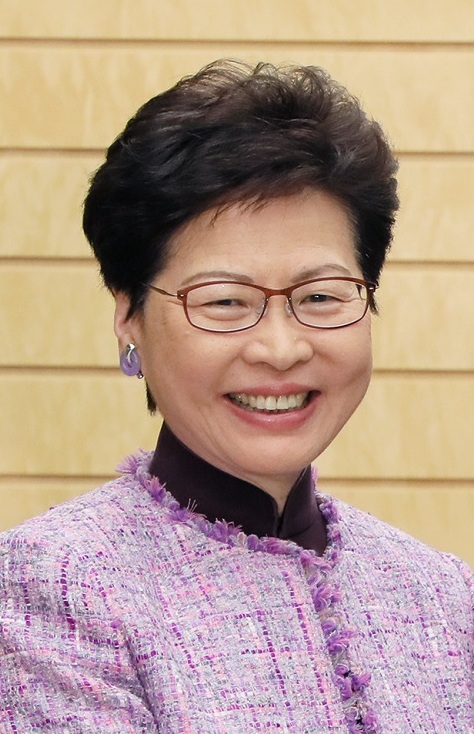
- Lam in 2019

4th Chief Executive of Hong Kong
- In office 1 July 2017 – 30 June 2022
- President: Xi Jinping
- Premier: Li Keqiang
- Preceded by: Leung Chun-ying
- Succeeded by: John Lee Ka-chiu

Chief Secretary for Administration
- In office 1 July 2012 – 16 January 2017
- Chief Executive: Leung Chun-ying
- Preceded by: Stephen Lam
- Succeeded by: Matthew Cheung

Secretary for Development
- In office 1 July 2007 – 30 June 2012
- Chief Executive: Donald Tsang
- Preceded by: Sarah Liao (Secretary for Environment, Transport & Works); Michael Suen (Secretary for Housing, Planning & Lands)
- Succeeded by: Mak Chai-kwong

Personal details
- Born: Cheng Yuet-ngor; 13 May 1957 (age 69) 229 Lockhart Road, Wan Chai, British Hong Kong
- Citizenship: Chinese (Hong Kong); (1997–present); British; (1990–2007)
- Spouse: Lam Siu-por (m. 1984)
- Children: 2 (including Yeuk-Hay Joshua‌)
- Education: St. Francis' Canossian College
- Alma mater: University of Hong Kong (BA); Wolfson College, Cambridge (UGAD)
- Occupation: Politician; civil servant

Chinese name
- Traditional Chinese: 林鄭月娥
- Simplified Chinese: 林郑月娥
Transcriptions
Standard Mandarin
- Hanyu Pinyin: Lín Zhèng Yuè'é
- Bopomofo: ㄌㄧㄣˊ ㄓㄥˋ ㄩㄝˋ ㄜˊ
- Wade–Giles: Lin^{2} Cheng^{4} Yüeh^{4}-ê^{2}; Lin^{2} Cheng^{4} Yo^{4}-ê^{2}
- Tongyong Pinyin: Lín Jhèng Yuè-é
- IPA: [lǐn ʈʂə̂ŋ ɥê.ɤ̌]
Hakka
- Romanization: Lìm Chhang Ngie̍t-ngò
Yue: Cantonese
- Yale Romanization: Làhm Jehng Yuht-ngòh
- Jyutping: lam4 zeng6 jyut6 ngo4
- IPA: [lɐm˩ tsɛŋ˨ jyt̚˨ ŋɔ˩]
Southern Min
- Hokkien POJ: Lîm Tē^{n} Goa̍t-ngô͘
- Carrie Lam's voice Lam announced that she will not participate in the 2022 Hong Kong Chief Executive election Recorded 4 April 2022

Carrie Lam Cheng Yuet-ngor (née Cheng; Chinese: 林鄭月娥; Cantonese Yale: Làhm Jehng Yuht-ngòh; born 13 May 1957) is a retired Hong Kong politician who served as the fourth Chief Executive of Hong Kong from 2017 to 2022, after serving as Chief Secretary for Administration for five years.

After graduating from the University of Hong Kong, Lam joined the British Hong Kong civil service in 1980 and served in various government agencies, including as Director of Social Welfare from 2000 to 2004 and Director General of the Hong Kong Economic and Trade Office in London from 2004 to 2006. She became a key official in 2007 when she was appointed Secretary for Development. During her tenure, she earned the nickname "tough fighter" for her role in the controversial demolition of the Queen's Pier in 2008.

Lam became Chief Secretary for Administration under the Leung Chun-ying administration in 2012. From 2013 to 2015, Lam headed the task force on the 2014 electoral reform and held talks with student and opposition leaders during the widespread protests. In the 2017 Chief Executive selection process, Lam obtained 777 votes from the 1,194-member appointed Election Committee as the Beijing-favoured candidate and became the first female Chief Executive of Hong Kong.

Lam's administration had been marred with a series of controversies and thus relatively unpopular since inauguration. Her government was also criticised for raising the qualification age for social security, the proposed cross-harbour tunnel toll plan, and the historic ban on the pro-independence National Party, among other policies.

In mid-2019, Lam pushed for the controversial extradition bill which received widespread domestic and international opposition. Massive protests broke out and persisted throughout the latter half of the year, from demanding the withdrawal of the bill to Lam's resignation among five key demands. Despite suspending the bill in June and eventually withdrawing the bill in September, Lam stood firmly against the other demands including an independent inquiry into police conduct and universal suffrage for legislative and leadership elections. Escalating clashes between protesters and police resulted in at least 10,000 arrests, and would only die down as COVID-19 hit the city. After the pro-government camp suffered a landslide defeat in the 2019 local elections, Lam's popularity further plunged to a record low due to the mishandling of the pandemic.

Lam also saw the Chinese Government imposing the national security law in July 2020, criticised for shrinking freedom in the city and silencing the dissidents. Opposition activists are tried and jailed while pro-democracy media were forced to close. In April 2022, Lam announced that she would not seek a second term as Chief Executive, giving her wish to devote more time with her family as an explanation. She was succeeded on 1 July 2022 by hardliner John Lee.

== Early life and education ==
Born Cheng Yuet-ngor to a low-income family of Zhoushan ancestry living at 229 Lockhart Road, Wan Chai, Hong Kong, Lam was the fourth of five children. Her father was from Shanghai and worked on ships. She was born and grew up in a subdivided tenement flat on 229 Lockhart Road, Wan Chai, where she finished her primary and secondary education at St. Francis' Canossian College, a Catholic girls' school in the neighbourhood, where she was head prefect.

After leaving school, Lam attended the University of Hong Kong. Through her student activism, she came to know Lee Wing-tat and Sin Chung-kai, who later became prominent pro-democracy legislators. She co-organised exchange trips to Tsinghua University in Beijing. To better understand society and participate more actively in student activities, she switched her course of study from social work to sociology after the first year to avoid placements. Lam eventually graduated as a bachelor of social sciences in 1980.

After graduating from the University of Hong Kong, she became an administrative officer in the Hong Kong Civil Service. In 1982, while she remained a civil servant, the Hong Kong government funded her further studies at the University of Cambridge, where she met her future husband, mathematician Lam Siu-por.

She had been awarded the Undergraduate Advanced Diploma (UGAdvDip or UGAD) in 1982 from Cambridge. UGAD is a FHEQ Level 6 award, the academic level is the equivalent to the final year of a bachelor's degree and they are generally accepted as equivalent to a bachelor's degree or a Graduate Diploma.

== Civil service career ==
Lam joined the Administrative Service in 1980 after she graduated from the University of Hong Kong. She served in various bureaus and departments, spending about seven years in the Finance Bureau which involved budgetary planning and expenditure control. Initially, she worked as Principal Assistant Secretary and subsequently as Deputy Secretary for the Treasury in the 1990s.

In 2000, Lam was promoted to the position of Director of the Social Welfare Department during a period of high unemployment and severe fiscal deficits in Hong Kong. She tightened the Comprehensive Social Security Assistance scheme, making it available only to people who had lived in Hong Kong for more than seven years, excluding new immigrants. With other senior officials, she helped set up the We Care Education Fund, raising over HK$80 million to meet the long term educational needs of children whose parents died from the SARS epidemic in 2003.

In November 2003, Lam was appointed Permanent Secretary for Housing, Planning and Lands and chairman of the Town Planning Board. She was soon appointed Director-General of the Hong Kong Economic and Trade Office in London in September 2004.

On 8 March 2006, Lam returned to Hong Kong to take up the position as Permanent Secretary for Home Affairs. She was involved in the 2008 Beijing Olympics and Paralympics Equestrian Events and the West Kowloon Cultural District plan.

== Secretary for Development ==
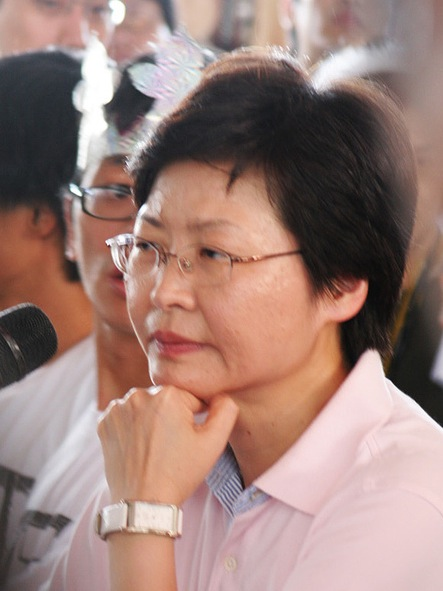
Lam facing conservationists at a public forum at the Queen's Pier in July 2007

On 1 July 2007, Lam left the civil service when she was appointed Secretary for Development by Chief Executive Donald Tsang, becoming one of the principal officials. In the first days of her office, Lam oversaw the demolition of the landmark Edinburgh Place Ferry Pier for the Star Ferry and the Queen's Pier to make way for land reclamation, which triggered occupation protests by the conservationists.

In July 2007, she attended a public forum at Queen's Pier in a bid to persuade the protesters to disperse and allow the demolition to begin. She firmly repeated the government's position that it was not an option to retain the pier and she would "not give the people false hope". Her handling of the pier conflict earned her a reputation as a "tough fighter" by the then Chief Secretary for Administration Rafael Hui.

Lam also put forward a new Urban Renewal Strategy to lower the threshold for compulsory sale for redevelopment from 90 percent to 80 percent in 2010. Human rights organisations criticised the policy as benefiting the big real estate developers and violating the right to housing as recognised by the Universal Declaration of Human Rights and International Covenant on Economic, Social and Cultural Rights as the bargaining power of the small owners would be undermined.

According to a report ("A decade of compression- Hong Kong nano-flat study 2010-2019") by Liber Research Community, in 2011, Lam oversaw amendments to the Code of Practice for Fire Safety, which simplified the application process for building open kitchens in apartments instead of separated kitchens, enabling property developers to more easily create nano-flats, defined as flats below 260 square feet.

In recognition of her achievements as Secretary for Development, she was awarded honorary member of the Hong Kong Institute of Landscape Architects, honorary fellow of the Hong Kong Institution of Engineers, Property Person of the Year in the RICS Hong Kong Property Awards 2012, honorary member of the Hong Kong Institute of Architects, honorary member of the Royal Institution of Chartered Surveyors, honorary fellow member of the Hong Kong Institute of Architectural Conservationists, and honorary fellow of the Institution of Civil Engineers.

During the 2012 Chief Executive election, Lam cracked down on the unauthorised building works of Chief Executive candidate Henry Tang who was contesting Leung Chun-ying. That scandal put paid to Tang's hopes of becoming Chief Executive. Leung was later found to also have unauthorised building works at his house. Lam was criticised for letting him get away with it.

=== Small house policy ===
In 2007, Lam wrote to the Heung Yee Kuk's then-chairman, Lau Wong-fat, reassuring him that villagers suspected of illegally transferring their ding rights would not be criminally prosecuted. The Hong Kong Economic Journal pointed out that it should not have been up to Lam and the Development Bureau to determine criminal prosecutions, but the Department of Justice instead.

In 2012, Lam led the Development Bureau in cracking down unauthorised building works largely found in the indigenous villages in the New Territories, though SCMP noted that Lam had turned a blind eye towards the issue in 2010. The change in law enforcement policy was opposed by leaders of rural communities and the Heung Yee Kuk, a statutory body representing rural interests. The Heung Yee Kuk staged protests against Lam and accused her of "robbing villagers of their fundamental rights". Lam also called to end the "Small House Policy" in 2012, which has been subject to abuse amidst a land crunch. The policy gives male indigenous villagers in the New Territories the right to build a house close to their ancestral homes but the policy has drawn criticism because in some cases, it has been abused for profit.

== Chief Secretary for Administration ==
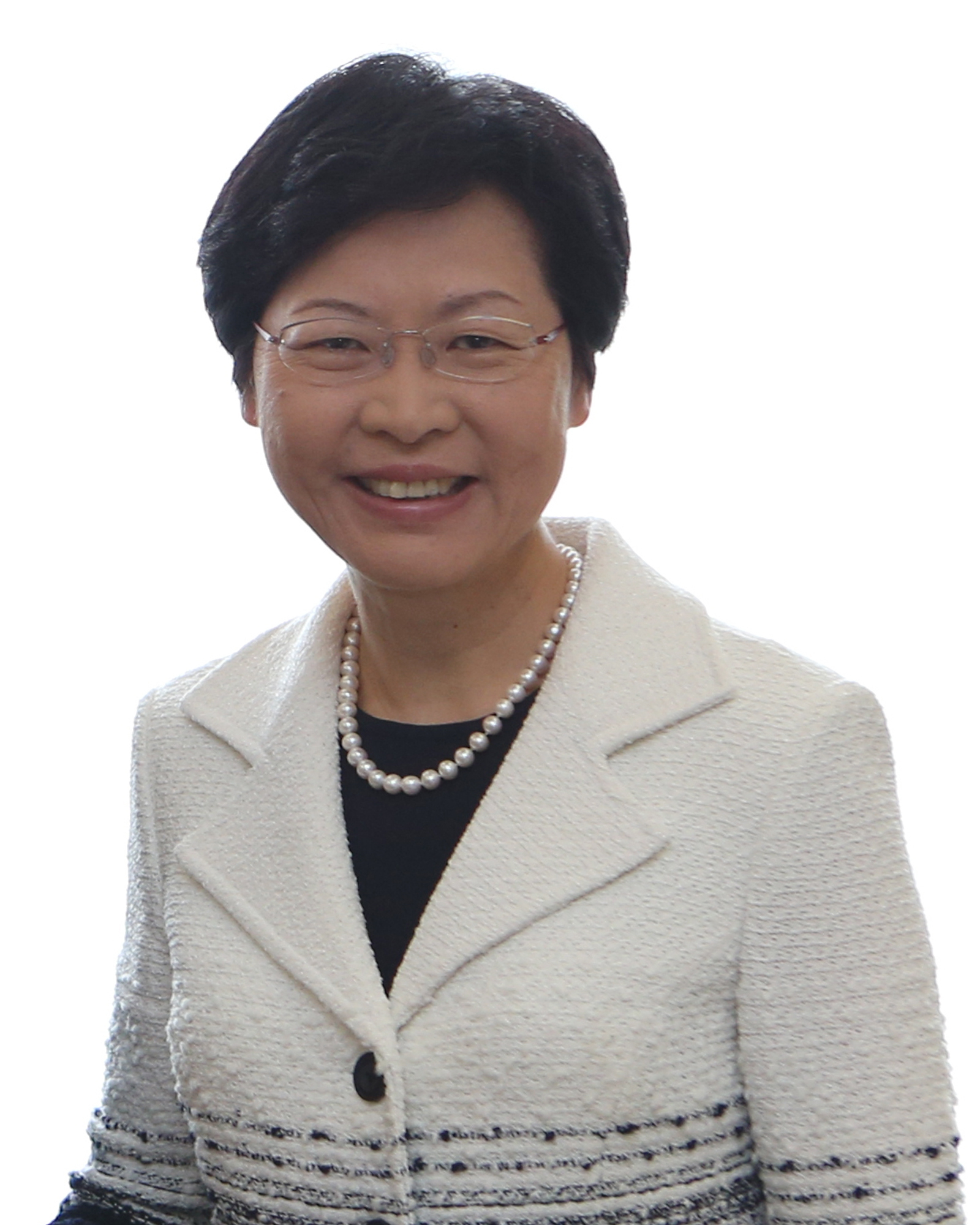
Lam in 2013

After hinting she would retire in the United Kingdom with her family, Lam received appointment to become the Chief Secretary for Administration under Chief Executive Leung Chun-ying on 1 July 2012. Her popularity started to shrink as Chief Secretary as the Moral and National Education controversy sparked in the first months of the Leung administration, which saw Lam's popularity rating dipped two percentage points from 64 percent to 62 percent.

=== 2014 political reform and protests ===
In October 2013, she became the head of the Task Force on Constitutional Development headed by Secretary for Justice Rimsky Yuen and Secretary for Constitutional and Mainland Affairs Raymond Tam which was responsible for the constitutional reform consultation for the electoral methods for the 2017 Chief Executive election and 2016 Legislative Council election. After Hong Kong Basic Law Committee member Rao Geping explicitly ruled out any form of open nomination for candidates in the 2017 Chief Executive election at a seminar, Lam characterised Rao's statement as "setting the tune of the gong with a final hit" which received attacks from the pan-democrats that Lam had effectively put an end to consultation on the issue even before it has begun.

After the National People's Congress Standing Committee (NPCSC) decreed the restriction on the 2017 Chief Executive election in August 2014, the pro-democracy suffragists launched a large-scale occupation protests which lasted for 79 days. In response to the occupations, Lam announced that the second round of public consultations on political reform, originally planned to be completed by the end of the year, would be postponed.

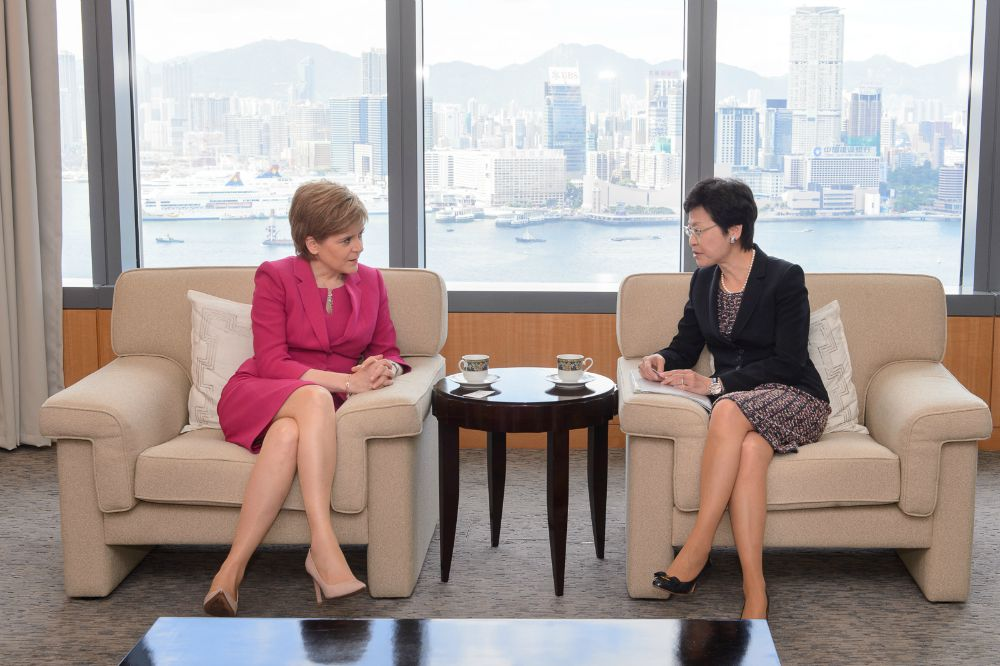
Lam meeting with Nicola Sturgeon, First Minister of Scotland, in 2015

During the midst of the occupation protests, Lam also held talks in a televised open debate with student leaders on 21 October. In the talks, Lam obdurately resisted, stating that students' proposal of civil nomination falls outside of the framework imposed by the Basic Law and the NPCSC decision, which could not be retracted.

The political reform uproar caused Lam to lose her long-held title as one of the most popular government officials when her approval ratings in a University of Hong Kong poll plunged to its lowest level since she became Chief Secretary. The constitutional reform proposals were defeated in the Legislative Council in June 2015.

=== Lead-in-water scandal and controversies ===
Lam sparked controversy when she was the only principal official not to offer an apology for the lead-in-water scandal, insisting that, "even though the commission’s hearings reflected an inadequate awareness by government departments and flaws in the monitoring system, it did not necessarily equate to particular officials not following laws or neglecting duties – because of that, they do not have to bear personal responsibility." She fought back pan-democrat legislators in a Legislative Council meeting, criticising the pan-democrats for politicising the scandal, stating that she could be as bold as she wants as "a government official with no expectation is always courageous". Her words were criticised for being arrogant.

She stirred another controversy when she, in a speech to open the Caritas Bazaar in 2015, Lam cited the eight Beatitudes, saying "Some said that the eighth blessing applies very well to me – it says, 'blessed are those who are persecuted for righteousness' sake: for theirs is the kingdom of heaven' – there is already a place reserved for me in heaven." Senior cleric, The Reverend Thomas Law Kwok-Fai, told the media "No one would say that about themselves ... I won’t dare to myself", while a senior lecturer at the Chinese University of Hong Kong said that Lam sounded arrogant.

=== Palace Museum controversy ===
In December 2016, Lam was under fire when she announced a deal with Beijing for the plans for a Hong Kong Palace Museum as the chair of the West Kowloon Cultural District Authority without any public consultation and transparency during the decision-making process. She was also criticised for appointing architect Rocco Yim Sen-kee to start a HK$4.5 million feasibility study for building the museum and exhibition centre complex behind closed doors months before the authority board chose the architect as its design consultant. Lam linked the backlash to her announcement that she would "reconsider" running in the 2017 Chief Executive election after incumbent Leung Chun-ying said he would not seek a second term. Lam previously said that she would retire in the English countryside with her family after her term ended in 2017.

== 2017 Chief Executive bid ==
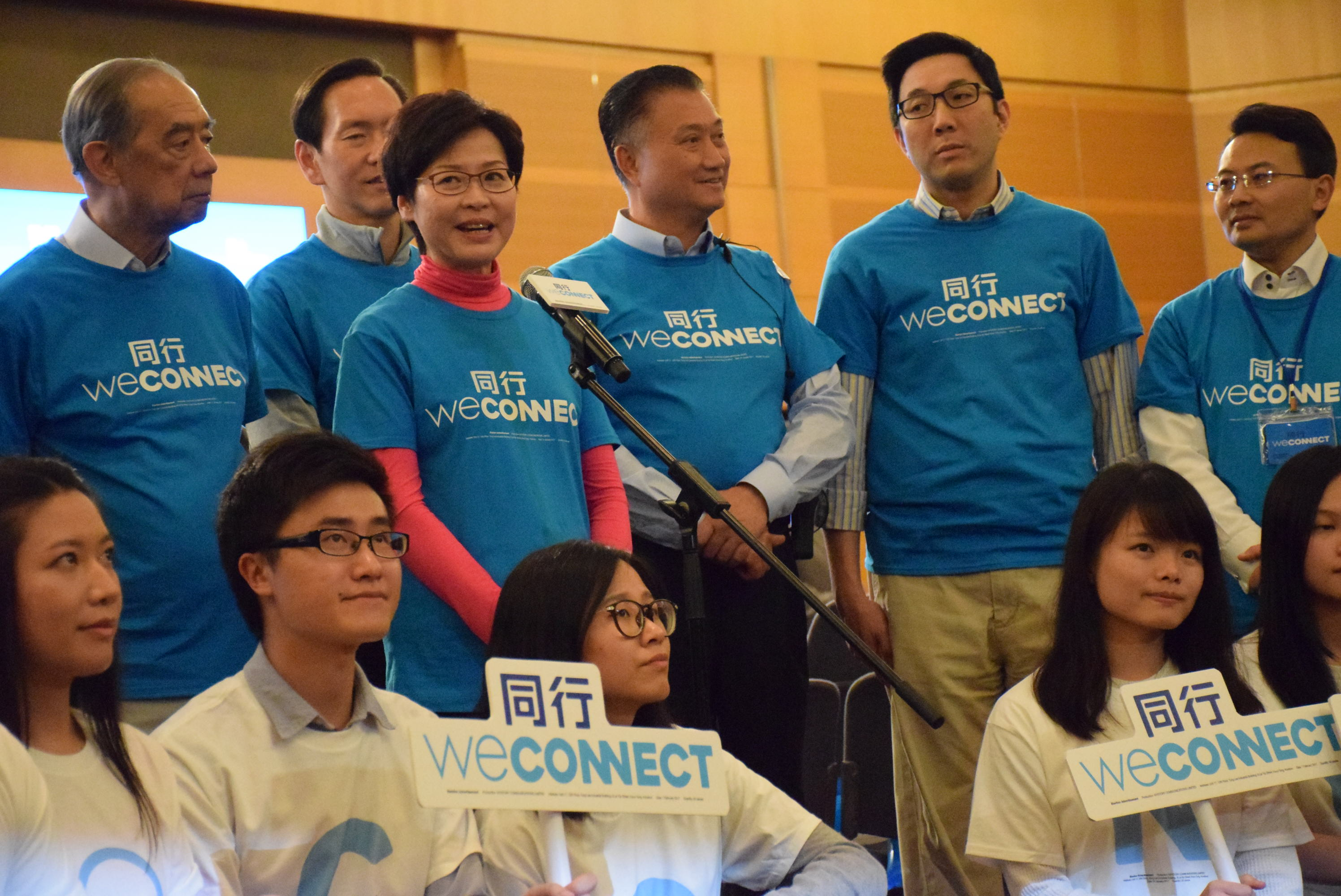
Lam held an election rally with her campaign team on 3 February 2017.

Lam formally announced her plan to enter the 2017 Chief Executive election after resigning as Chief Secretary on 12 January 2017, ending her 36-year government career. She also set out what she described as an eight-point "achievable new vision" with a call to play to "strengths with determination and confidence". The election rally with the campaign slogan of "We Connect" including the catchwords "We Care, We Listen, We Act" was attended by many pro-Beijing figures and tycoons from both the Henry Tang and Leung Chun-ying camps in the last election. She also revealed a campaign team, which included council of chairpersons and senior advisers consisting of heavyweights including senior pro-Beijing politicians and tycoons.

On 6 February, multiple media reports said National People's Congress (NPC) chairman Zhang Dejiang, who was simultaneously head of the Chinese Communist Party (CCP)'s Central Coordination Group for Hong Kong and Macau Affairs, and Sun Chunlan, head of the party's United Front Work Department, were in Shenzhen to meet with some Election Committee members from the major business chambers and political groups. It was reported that Zhang told the electors that the CCP Politburo had decided to support Carrie Lam in the election.

In response to the criticism of not having a full election platform, Lam revealed her manifesto titled "Connecting for Consensus and A Better Future" on 27 February, two days before the nomination period ended. The platform focused on reforming the government structure and boosting the economy, but did not make any promise on relaunching the political reform or Article 23 legislation. Carrie Lam submitted a total of 579 nominations on 28 February, just 22 votes short of the final number needed to win the race. Lam dominated in the pro-Beijing business and political sectors, winning three-quarters of the votes in the business sector, but failed to receive any nomination from the pro-democracy camp.

On 26 March 2017, Lam was elected Chief Executive with 777 votes in the 1,194-member Election Committee, 197 more votes than she got in the nomination period. She is the first female leader of Hong Kong, the first candidate to be elected without leading in the polls and the first leader to have graduated from the University of Hong Kong. She pledged to "heal the social divide" and "unite our society to move forward" in her victory speech.

== Chief Executive ==
Lam received the appointment from Chinese Premier Li Keqiang on 11 April 2017. Lam was sworn in by General Secretary of the Chinese Communist Party and President Xi Jinping, on 1 July 2017, the 20th anniversary of the establishment of the Special Administrative Region, becoming the first female Chief Executive.

=== Suppression of localists and independence supporters ===
==== Disqualifications of localists ====
In July 2017 weeks after Lam sworn in, four pro-democracy legislators Leung Kwok-hung, Yiu Chung-yim, Nathan Law and Lau Siu-lai who were legally challenged for their oath-taking manners by the then Chief Executive Leung Chun-ying and Secretary for Justice Rimsky Yuen were disqualified by the court. The event caused the quick deterioration of the relations between the pro-democracy camp and the government after the strained relations had been improved compared to Lam's predecessor Leung Chun-ying. Lam pledged she would not target more pro-democrats in oath-taking controversy.

In the 2018 Legislative Council by-election for four of the six vacancies left by the disqualified legislators, Demosistō candidate Agnes Chow was disqualified for her party's platform of calling for "self-determination". After the European Union issued a statement warning that banning Chow from the by-election "risks diminishing Hong Kong’s international reputation as a free and open society", Lam defended the returning officer's decision, but denied that she had anything to do with the returning officer, stating that "there are absolutely no grounds for that sort of accusation or allegation of pressure."

In the November 2018 Kowloon West by-election, the candidacy of the ousted legislator Lau Siu-lai was also disqualified by the returning officer as she advocated for "self-determination" on her 2016 electoral platform. Her ally and elected legislator Eddie Chu, who signed the same statement in the 2016 election, was also barred from running in the rural representative election in December 2018. Lam supported the Returning Officer's decision that "had been made in accordance with the Rural Representative Election Ordinance."

==== Ban on pro-independence party ====
In July 2018, the Hong Kong Police Force unprecedentedly served the convenor of the pro-independence Hong Kong National Party Chan Ho-tin a notice under the Societies Ordinance and sought to ban the Party. The police claimed that the party has engaged in sedition and that the party may be banned on grounds of national security with respect to Chinese territorial integrity. The notice contained highly detailed surveillance material on the party leadership's public engagements. On 24 October 2018, Chan Ho-tin and party spokesman Jason Chow Ho-fai filed appeals against the ban with the Chief Executive and Executive Council but were eventually rejected.

In August, a controversy erupted in 2018 when the Foreign Correspondents' Club (FCC) hosted a lunchtime talk with Chan Ho-tin on 14 August. A Financial Times journalist Victor Mallet, vice-chairman of the press organisation, chaired the session. The event was opposed by the governments of China and Hong Kong, because the issue of independence supposedly crossed one of the "bottom lines" on national sovereignty. Upon returning to Hong Kong after a visit to Bangkok, Mallet was denied a working visa by the Hong Kong government. He was then subjected to a four-hour interrogation by immigration officers upon his return from Thailand on Sunday, 7 October before he was finally allowed to enter Hong Kong on a seven-day tourist visa. Carrie Lam refused to make any comment, only stating that the Immigration Department was not obliged to explain individual cases.

=== Infrastructure projects ===
==== Express Rail Link co-location plan ====
In July 2017, the Lam administration proposed co-location arrangement of the Guangzhou–Shenzhen–Hong Kong Express Rail Link (XRL) has sparked concerns that it might constitute a breach of the Basic Law and undermine Hong Kong's autonomy of "One Country, Two Systems", especially regarding the immigration control issue. In January 2018, Carrie Lam slammed the Hong Kong Bar Association for its criticism on the "co-location arrangement" which would allow customs officers from mainland China to set up checkpoints and exercise jurisdiction inside the West Kowloon station. The Bar Association criticised the arrangement for distortion of the Basic Law, stating it damages the rule of law in Hong Kong as Article 18 was clearly written and leaves no room for any interpretation which would allow Chinese law to apply in any certain part of HKSAR.

Lam defended the bill and responded by stating that "some Hong Kong legal professionals have an elitist mentality or double standards, that is, they think that Hong Kong’s legal system is supreme, and that the mainland legal system – a big country with a 1.3 billion population – is wrong." Her statement prompted widespread disbelief as she appeared to defend Chinese legal system being better than Hong Kong's legal system which is derived from British system, accusing her of hypocrisy as she herself is seen as an elite out of touch with society, damaging the One Country, Two Systems principle and for attacking the character instead of the arguments of Hong Kong's lawyers.

The long-debated plan was finally passed on 14 June 2018 in the Legislative Council by 40 to 20 votes after Legislative Council President Andrew Leung capped debate time for the bill at 36 hours to counter pro-democrats' filibustering. The cross-border Express Rail Link was opened on 22 September 2018, followed by the opening of another cross-border infrastructure Hong Kong–Zhuhai–Macau Bridge on 23 October 2018 by CCP general secretary Xi Jinping. Lam entering the venue side by side with Xi and ahead of Macau Chief Executive Fernando Chui and First Vice Premier Han Zheng. The entrance raised eyebrows among those who saw it as a departure from protocol for her to walk in front of top mainland officials.

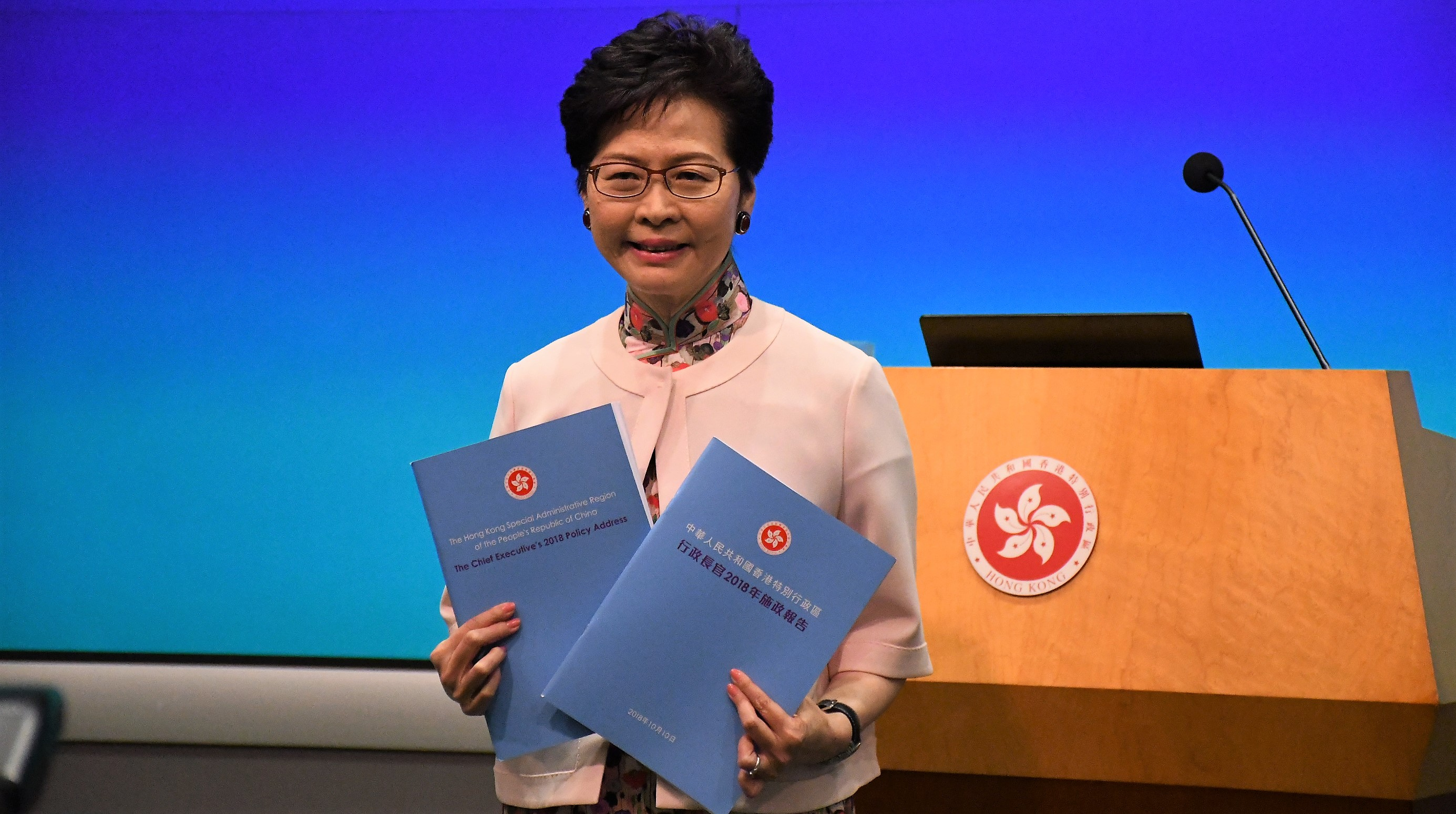
Lam published the second policy address in her term of office in October 2018.

==== Lantau Tomorrow Vision ====
In October 2018, Lam launched a development plan in her second policy address which suggested the construction of artificial islands with a total area of about 1,700 hectares through massive land reclamation near Kau Yi Chau and Hei Ling Chau of the eastern waters of Lantau Island. The project meets with controversies and opposition for its high cost of estimated HK$500 billion (US$63.8 billion) – amounting to half of the city's fiscal reserves – as well as environmental concerns.

=== Late 2018 to early 2019 crises ===
==== UGL case closure ====
On 12 December 2018, the Independent Commission Against Corruption (ICAC) announced it would not take any "further investigative action" against former Chief Executive Leung Chun-ying over his receipt of HK$50 million from the Australian engineering firm UGL, ending the four-year marathon probe. The Department of Justice also issued a statement claiming there was "insufficient evidence to support a reasonable prospect of conviction" against Leung for any criminal offence.

Carrie Lam defended Secretary for Justice Teresa Cheng who was strongly criticised for not following the conventional procedure of seeking external legal advice in the UGL case. Lam said Cheng had made a professional call and that she hoped the UGL saga, which had been a point of contention for four years, could finally end.

==== Age threshold of the elderly CSSA ====
In January 2019, the Lam administration announced that the age threshold for elderly Comprehensive Social Security Assistance (CSSA) would jump from 60 to 65, starting in February. She faced opposition from both the pro-Beijing and pro-democracy legislators, in which she responded that it was the Legislative Council who approved the change in the CSSA scheme, as part of the 2018 Budget. Her remarks attracted backlashes from the legislators as well as the public. On 18 January, Lam backed down by announcing that people affected would get a new employment support supplement that would cover the cut. The Lam government also made a U-turn by suspending the controversial plan to impose a HK$200 penalty on Hong Kong's senior citizens claiming welfare payments without joining a job programme.

==== $4,000 handout scheme ====
The government was also under fire by the HK$4,000 handout scheme proposed in the Financial Secretary Paul Chan's 2018 Budget in which adult residents would get up to HK$4,000 if they do not own property or get government benefits. The application procedure was criticised for being too complicated. Applicants were initially required to provide an address proof. Facing the criticism, the government later waived the address proof requirement.

Amid the UGL case and the mismanagements, the average score of Carrie Lam further plunged to a new low in mid January to 50.9 in the poll by the University of Hong Kong, dropping 5.5 points from the previous month. Her net approval rating fell 21 percentage points to a new low. In another poll conducted by Chinese University of Hong Kong, Lam scored the lowest point of only 50.9 percent – 1.8 percentage points lower than the previous month. Lam softened her tone after the widespread criticism. "The implementation of these measures has made people question the ability of this administration to govern," Lam said. "I completely accept this criticism."

==== Cross-harbour tunnel toll plan ====
The Lam administration first presented a cross-harbour tunnel toll plan in January 2019 to balance the traffic between the three cross-harbour tunnels by raising tolls at the publicly operated overused Cross-Harbour Tunnel and Eastern Harbour Tunnel, while lowering them for the privately run Western Harbour Tunnel which was underused because of its higher charges. But Secretary for Transport and Housing Frank Chan abruptly withdrew it after strong opposition from the Legislative Council. The government made two changes to the motion in the hope of getting more support, but legislators across the political spectrum remained unconvinced. In March, Carrie Lam said her government has decided to shelve the plan for the second time as the government could not get enough votes in the legislature, symbolising the first defeat of the Lam administration.

=== Anti-extradition bill protests ===
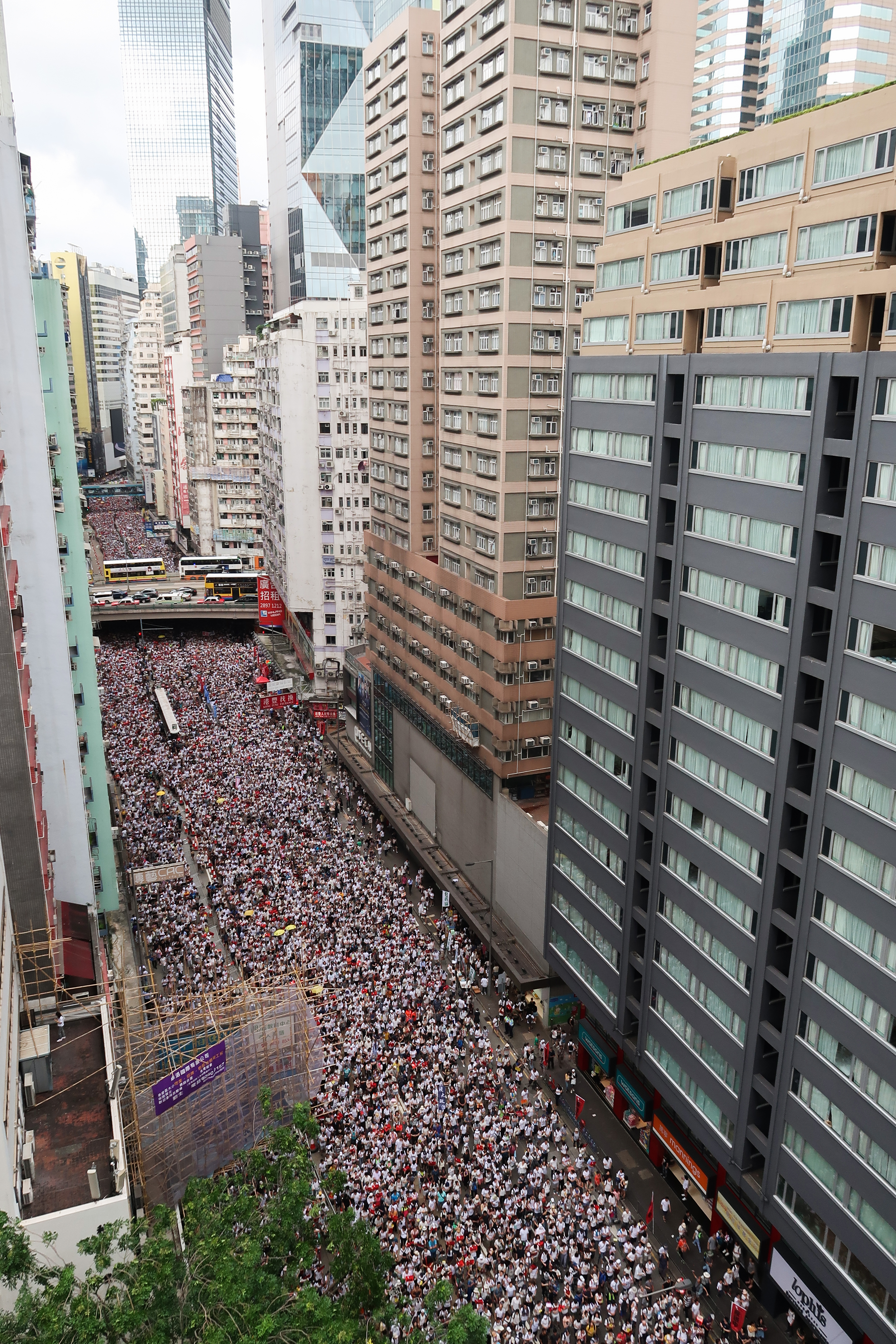
Protesters demonstrating against the extradition bill on 9 June 2019.

==== Introduction of the bill and opposition ====
In mid-2019, the Lam government introduced a bill to amend the Fugitive Offenders Ordinance and Mutual Legal Assistance in Criminal Matters Ordinance. This sparked opposition which expressed fears about the city opening itself to mainland Chinese law and urged the government to establish an extradition arrangement with Taiwan only. Lam insisted that she would proceed with the bill and that the Legislative Councillors must still pass new extradition laws before their summer break. Lam also claimed that the bill controversy had been "escalated" by foreign powers, allegedly seizing the opportunity to attack the mainland's legal system and human rights record. She survived the first motion of no-confidence against her with the backing of the pro-Beijing majority in the legislature on 29 May. Democratic Party legislator Andrew Wan who moved the motion claimed that Lam "blatantly lied" about the bill.

The 9 June peaceful demonstration against the bill saw a new high number of over a million people marching in the streets as the organisers claimed, but the government issued a press statement, that it "acknowledge[s] and respect[s] that people have different views on a wide range of issues", but insisted the second reading debate on the bill would resume on 12 June. On the day of the second reading, the protest outside the government headquarters later descended into violent clashes with the police. Amid the clashes, Lam appeared in a TVB interview where she was in tears when asked if she betrayed Hong Kong, replying "I grew up with all Hong Kong people and my love for this place has prompted me to make many personal sacrifices." Instead of selling out Hong Kong, she said her husband had told her that after she became Chief Executive she had "sold herself to Hong Kong". She said she had done nothing against her conscience and would not withdraw the bill. However within three hours, Lam released another video with a change of the tone, strongly reprimanding protesters for the "blatant, organised riot" and condemning it as "not an act of love for Hong Kong."

After her tearful television interview failed to stop the intense violent clashes on 12 June, Carrie Lam announced a pause in the passage of the extradition bill on 15 June. On 16 June, nearly two million protesters, as claimed by the organisers, peacefully flooded the streets demanding a full withdrawal of the bill. In response, Lam apologised to Hong Kong residents, promised to "sincerely and humbly accept all criticism and to improve and serve the public", and repeatedly stated that the bill had already been suspended.

==== Persisting protests ====
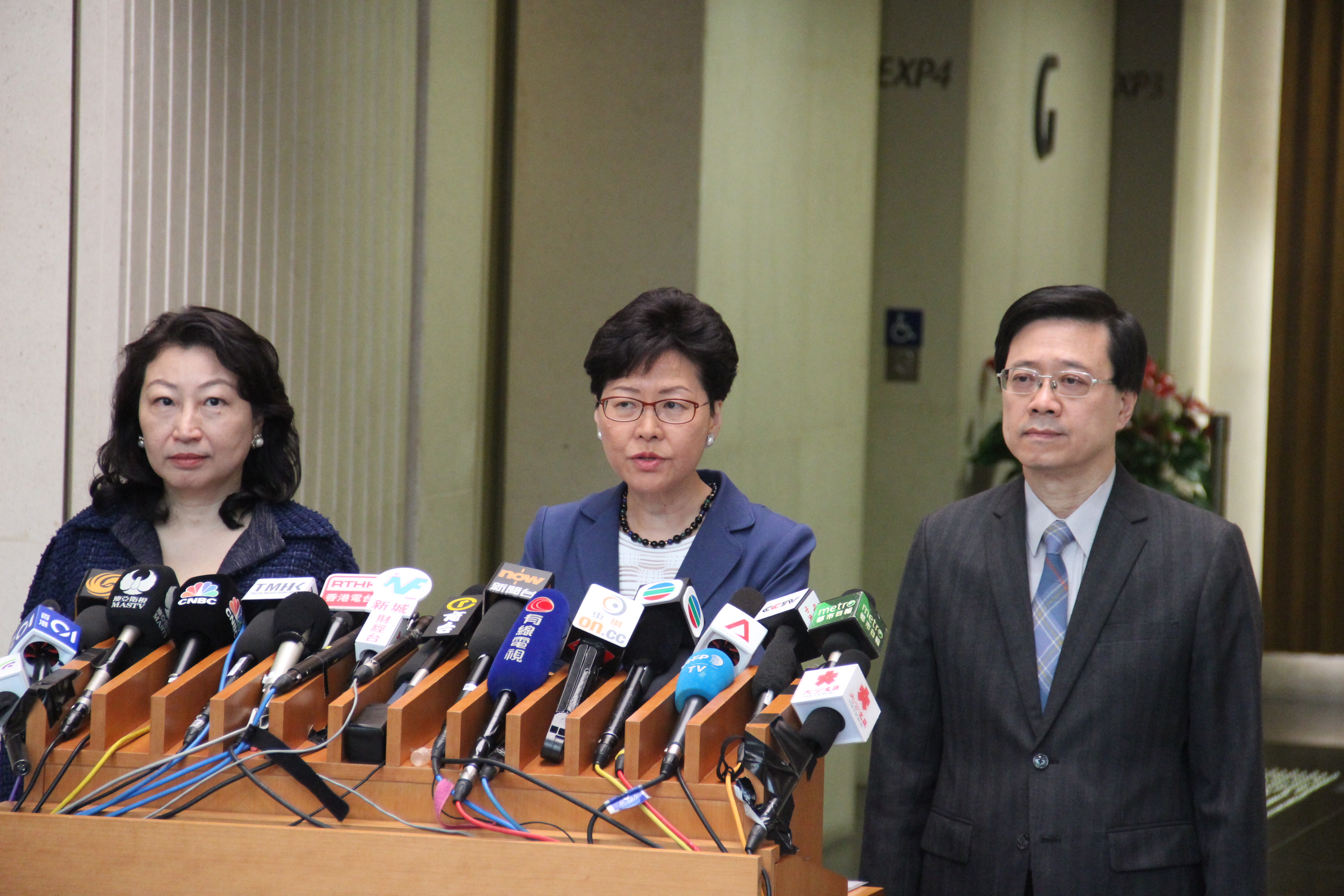
Lam at the press conference with Secretary for Justice Teresa Cheng and Secretary for Security John Lee one day after the massive protest on 10 June.

The protests took a dramatic turn on 1 July, the 22nd anniversary of the handover of Hong Kong as a group of protesters stormed the Legislative Council Complex and vandalised the building, leaving graffiti such as "It was you who told me peaceful marches did not work." Lam refused to grant any of the five key demands requested by the protesters, namely the full withdrawal of the extradition bill, a commission of inquiry into the police misconduct, release and a possible amnesty of the arrested protesters, the retraction of the categorisation of the protests as "riots" and universal suffrage of the Chief Executive and Legislative Council. As the protests intensified and spread to different districts of the city, Lam saw her support in August 2019 fall to a record low of 17 percent, with those opposed hitting 76 percent, according to a survey released by the Hong Kong Public Opinion Research Institute. Satisfaction with the SAR government fell to 14 percent, the lowest ever recorded in post-colonial times. Notwithstanding a 2017 pledge, she refused to resign, claiming the community needed her to "hold the fort".

On 2 September 2019, Reuters published a recording of a behind-the-door talk that Lam had given in late August 2019 to several businesspeople. Lam said that "for a Chief Executive to have caused this huge havoc to Hong Kong is unforgivable. It's just unforgivable. If I have a choice, the first thing is to quit, having made a deep apology, is to step down." She also said "the political room for [the Chief Executive who serves two masters, Beijing and the Hong Kong people] manoeuvering is very, very, very limited." Lam responded that the leak was "very inappropriate", and that she had "not even contemplated tendering resignation". Shortly after that, on 4 September Lam formally withdrew the bill after three months of unprecedented anti-government protests, but gave no sign of stepping down or conceding to any of the protesters' other four key demands. She only repeatedly stated that the Complaints Against Police Office (CAPO), a unit within the Police Force, and the Independent Police Complaints Council (IPCC), a monitoring body, would still be able to handling the complaint cases as the accusations against police mismanagement, brutality and corruption mounted up, including the July 21 Yuen Long attack and August 31 Prince Edward station attack. Lam also held a dialogue session was held on 26 September as she pledged to communicate with the public, but no subsequent session has been held since then.

Attempting to curb the ongoing protests, Carrie Lam on 4 October invoked the Emergency Regulations Ordinance to impose a law to ban wearing face masks in public gatherings which was later declared unconstitutional by the High Court in November. Protests and citywide flashmob rallies against the anti-mask law and the invocation of the emergency ordinance persisted throughout the month.

==== Electoral defeat and impeachment attempt ====
In the November District Council elections which were seen as a de facto referendum on the persisting protests, Lam's pro-Beijing camp suffered from the largest electoral defeat in Hong Kong history with pro-democrats gaining more than 240 seats, over 80 percent of the available seats, and controlling 17 of the 18 District Councils. Carrie Lam said that her government would "listen humbly" and "seriously reflect" on views expressed at the election and would set up an independent review committee to look at cause of social unrest, modelling on Britain's response to the 2011 Tottenham riots, fell short of the protesters' demand on an independent commission of inquiry. Shortly after the election, U.S. President Donald Trump signed the Hong Kong Human Rights and Democracy Act which was previously passed overwhelmingly in the United States Congress into law. Lam said she was disappointed by the passage of the Act, and said the Hong Kong freedom had not been eroded.

In December, 25 pro-democrat legislators tabled an impeachment motion to form an independent investigative committee to examine claims that Lam's conduct constituted a "serious breach of the law and dereliction of duty". Despite the motion being defeated, with 36 voted "no" and 26 voted yes, Lam received criticism from both pro-democracy and pro-Beijing legislators for mishandling the extradition bill and the protests.

=== COVID-19 outbreak ===
The months-long anti-government protests and the alleged initial mishandling of the coronavirus outbreak cost Carrie Lam's substantial public support. A Hong Kong Public Opinion Research Institute survey in late January found 75 percent of respondents were dissatisfied with the government's response to the outbreak, while Lam's support rating sunk to nine percent in late February, the lowest on record for any leader. In February 2020, a confidential report by Carrie Lam to the central government revealed that Lam's attempt to win back the public trust and support by effectively handling the coronavirus outbreak in which she believed would serve as a political turnaround for the coming election.

In March 2021, Lam complained that the public was not working with her administration to get vaccinated fast enough, stating "now we encourage people to take the vaccines, people don't do that." Earlier in February 2021, the government gave the Sinovac vaccine an exemption from an earlier requirement of having to publish third phase trial data in a medical journal before being approved for use in Hong Kong. Also in March 2021, Lam condemned some medical workers, claiming that they were "smearing" and "spreading fake news, misinformation" about Sinovac.

In early August 2021, Lam announced that some sectors of workers would have to be vaccinated or otherwise pay for regular testing to continue to work. This measure has drawn criticism and approval. As of the date this announcement was made by Lam, only 36% of Hong Kong citizens had been fully vaccinated.

On the morning of 14 June 2022, Lam stated that anti-epidemic measures would not be changed in the near future, and that "having considered the situation and of course the need to maintain a more stable infection situation in Hong Kong, we have decided that we will maintain the status quo up to the 30th of June, 2022". Later in the day, the government reversed course and announced the tightening of anti-epidemic measures, requiring people who go to bars and nightclubs to present a negative test within the past 24 hours.

=== National security legislation ===
In May 2020, the Beijing authorities initiated a plan for implementing the national security law for Hong Kong which would prominently criminalise "separatism, subversion, terrorism and foreign interference", which many interpreted as a crackdown on civil liberties, government critics, and the independence movement. Carrie Lam welcomed the adoption of the draft decision on national security law, stressing that the SAR government will "fully cooperate with the Standing Committee of the National People's Congress (NPC) to complete the relevant work on legislation as soon as possible." The first concrete details of the legislation were announced on 15 June 2020, but by the time the NPCSC were approving final drafts on 29 June 2020, Carrie Lam had still not seen a draft of the law. In an interview with CNBC, last British governor Chris Patten called Lam a "lamentable and quisling figure in Hong Kong history" for mishandling the city's political crisis which led to the national security law which, in his view, undermined the city's rule of law and judicial independence, posing a threat to the cherished freedoms that have allowed Hong Kong to thrive.

On 14 October 2020, the United States Department of State released a report on 10 individuals who materially contributed to the failure of China to meet its obligations under the Sino–British Joint Declaration and Hong Kong's Basic Law. Lam was on the list.

In November 2020, Lam said that the national security law was "remarkably effective" and that "After a year of social unrest with fear for personal safety, Hong Kong people can once again enjoy their basic rights and freedoms according to the law." Also, Lam said that she did not feel guilty for sparking the protests, and that "I do not feel guilty. What wrong have I done? I have introduced a piece of legislation for very good reasons." In contrast to her opinion, activist Nathan Law said, after the expulsion of 4-pro democracy lawmakers from the Hong Kong Legislative Council, that "Erosion of Hong Kong's freedom has reached a new height."

In January 2021, Lam said that district councillors and all 1200 members of the Chief Executive Election Committee should be considered as "public officers" under the national security law, and therefore be required to take an oath to swear loyalty to the government.

On 25 January 2021, Lam claimed that the national security law protects people's rights and freedoms, and that "These important features have put our national security law on par with, if not superior to, similar national security laws in other jurisdictions, including the US." In August 2021, despite earlier claims, Lam said that rights and freedoms as guaranteed by the Basic Law may have to give way for "more important goals" such as national security, and said that "Human rights and freedoms are not absolute."

In March 2021, Lam said that authorities would be on "full alert" to make sure museum exhibits do not violate the national security law, and also said "Would the art pieces to be displayed there breach the so-called red line? With the national security law in place, we have to safeguard national security."

In January 2022, Lam said during the opening of the new legislative sessions under the "patriots only" election, that the government would broaden the crimes under the national security law, without specifying which offences would be included.

In March 2022, after two British non-permanent judges resigned from the Court of Final Appeal due to concerns their participation would be seen as supporting "an administration which has departed from values of political freedom, and freedom of expression", Lam said that "What I find very disturbing and I cannot accept is the association of their resignation with the implementation of the national security law or the practice of individual rights and freedoms in Hong Kong."

In June 2022, Lam said that "People think there's no freedom but it's not the situation... Hong Kong is as free as ever," including "freedom of expression, in the freedom of assembly, in the media, and so on". Additionally, she said that the government had done a poor job at explaining the legal matter but ultimately did "not think the government made a mistake in introducing this bill".

==== Sanctions ====
In August 2020, Lam and ten other officials were sanctioned by the U.S. Department of the Treasury under Executive Order 13936 by President Donald Trump for undermining Hong Kong's autonomy. The sanction is based on the Hong Kong Autonomy Act and Lam would be listed in the Specially Designated Nationals and Blocked Persons List.

As a result of the sanctions Lam has lost all access to banking services. She told the Hong Kong International Business Channel "I am using cash every day for everything. I have piles of cash at home because the government is paying my salary in cash.” Because SWIFT and the U.S. dollar banking system is important to the international banking system not even Chinese state-owned banks would be willing to do business with sanctioned individuals. Lam stated that she regarded it as an honor to be "unjustifiably sanctioned" by the United States government.

==== Disqualification of lawmakers ====
In November 2020, following the expulsion of 4 pro-democracy lawmakers from the Hong Kong Legislative Council, Lam revealed that it was she who had requested the National People's Congress Standing Committee (NPCSC) for help with disqualifying the lawmakers. Earlier on 18 August 2020, Lam made a contradictory remark at a press conference, saying "As the NPCSC has made this decision to let all members of the current Legco perform their duties, then they can just return and perform. I am not the one who can tell whether they will come back or not."

=== Democratic reform ===
In November 2020, Lam said that when she first became Chief Executive, she "fantasised" about implementing democratic reform in Hong Kong, "but the bubbles burst quickly." Also, she claimed that democratic reform would only further divide society. In addition, Lam said that universal suffrage would not be implemented until Hong Kong's constitutional order and political system are "restored." In March 2021, Lam said that she was "quite certain" that Hong Kong could still move towards universal suffrage.

In April 2021, Lam accused Emily Lau of "not understanding democracy."

In September 2021, when speaking of Hong Kong's reforms to allow only "patriots" to serve in elections, Lam said that "In a way, it's a democratic system that suits Hong Kong better, because there are still elections."

In November 2021, Lam said it was "wrong" to think that Beijing "owes" universal suffrage to Hong Kong. She has also criticised the West's "so-called democracy", and stated that "We cannot copy and paste the so-called democratic system or rules of the Western countries."

=== Criticism of teachers ===
Even though Lam introduced the failed Hong Kong extradition bill, Lam in November 2020 also said that the 2019–2020 Hong Kong protests were partially due to the city's teachers, and that the government will take "stringent actions" against teachers deemed "incompetent or found misconducted." Additionally, Lam said that "We cannot bear to see that with the infiltration of politics into school campuses, students are drawn into political turbulence or even misled to engage in illegal and violent acts." In response, Ip Kin-yuen said there was no evidence to back Lam's claim that teachers fueled the protests.

=== Anti-bribery laws ===
In 2017, Lam promised in her election manifesto that she would extend Hong Kong's anti-bribery laws to cover the Chief Executive position. In December 2020, she reneged on the promise, stating that it would affect her "constitutional role." In contrast, former lawmaker Lam Cheuk-ting said that such an exclusion is a loophole and that adding it would create a checks and balance system for the Chief Executive. Lo Kin-hei called the promise break "utterly irresponsible behaviour", asking "Are probity and honesty no longer important?"

=== Oath taking ===
In response to the Civil Service Bureau under Patrick Nip mandating that all civil servants pledge an oath of loyalty to the government, Lam in January 2021 stated that she did not believe such an oath would hurt morale for civil servants, despite civil service unions expressing concern that the terms of the oath are too vague.

=== Dual nationality ===
In February 2021, Lam stated that Hong Kong would begin to enforce a previously written law that does not recognize dual nationality; those of Chinese descent who were born in Hong Kong or mainland China would be considered Chinese nationals, regardless of their other passports. Lam said that those with other passports "will not be eligible for consular protection, including consular visits, so that is very clear." Lam's husband and both of their sons have British passports; Lam has previously said that her husband and sons would not give up their British passports.

=== Patriots ===
In February 2021, after Director of the Hong Kong and Macau Affairs Office Xia Baolong stated that only "patriots" could govern the city and that changes to the election system were needed to choose patriots, Lam defended the view that the mainland government had to intervene, and claimed "The central government is very worried and that's why it has to solve the problems to prevent the situation from worsening to a point where the 'One Country, Two Systems' principle can no longer be implemented in Hong Kong." In addition, Lam denied that her poor performance was to blame for the decision of the central government to get involved with the implementation of "patriots" ruling the government.

In March 2021, after the NPCSC approved changes to only allow "patriots" to serve in the government, Lam claimed that those with different political beliefs would still be able to run for election, as long as they are patriots and comply with the national security law.

In December 2021, during the first election cycle (2021 Hong Kong legislative election) under the new rule, Lam dismissed concerns of low voter turnout, stating that low voter turnout "does not mean anything" and could mean citizens are satisfied with the government. One of her secretaries, Erick Tsang, later provided a seemingly contradictory statement, saying that "Voter turnout could be affected by many factors. Some foreign forces or anti-Chinese elements have been befogging the minds of the people and urging them not to vote. We do not rule out that this could affect [people's enthusiasm]." Zhao Lijan, mainland China's foreign ministry spokesperson, also blamed low voter turnout on "anti-China elements bent on destroying Hong Kong and the interference of external forces".

After the election which had a record-low voter turnout of 30.2%, Lam stated that high turnout rates for voting was not always a positive thing, and that people should ignore her past comments which praised high voter turnout. Lam also stated that "So if you asked me today about what I said in 2017, 2018, 2019 as chief executive, I can tell you it's meaningless."

=== Lavish gifts ===
In July 2021, it was revealed that 3 senior officials in the government (Au Ka-wang, Hermes Tang, and Sonny Au) had broken social-distancing measures by accepting a free hotpot dinner at a private club. Government regulations state that officials "must avoid any lavish, unreasonably generous or frequent entertainment that may lead to embarrassment in performing official duties or bring the civil service into disrepute", to which Lam retorted that "There's no definition of what a lavish dinner is. There's no definition of what is being unreasonable. At the end of the day, it's a matter of judgement." Lam stated that people shouldn't be "too harsh" on the officials for their actions.

=== Media suppression ===
In December 2021, after Stand News was shut down by the government, Lam denied that there was any suppression of press freedom in the city, and claimed that "We are not targeting certain media outlets or those with a particular stance. But when these media outlets have committed certain acts that may fall foul of the law, we have to take action."

In January 2022, after Citizen News shut down and cited "vague" laws, Lam claimed there was no direct link with Stand News and Citizen News closing and the national security law's impact on press freedom. Lam also deflected and said "You name me which western country does not have national security law. They have national security legislation far more draconian than the Hong Kong national security law, which is very well-defined."

In April 2022, after the Foreign Correspondents' Club (FCC) cancelled the 2022 Human Rights Press Awards over fears that it would violate the national security law, Lam claimed that it was an "isolated incident" and that press freedom in Hong Kong has always been upheld.

=== Criticisms of COVID-19 spreaders ===
In January 2022, Lam criticised and summoned the CEO and chair of Cathay Pacific, after a former employee broke home quarantine rules and spread the Omicron variant of COVID-19 in Hong Kong. Lam said "As senior management, they may not know every act of their employees, but this cannot be a liability-escape clause. As head of an organisation, just like me as the [Hong Kong] chief, I have to take responsibility for everything."

A few days later, after a COVID-19 cluster was spread at a birthday party hosted by Witman Hung Wai-man with 222 guests (many of them government officials), Lam was asked whether she should take responsibility for the government officials' actions. She changed her earlier opinion and said she would not take responsibility for their actions, and that the individuals would have to take responsibility.

Former official Raymond Young, in a letter to SCMP, revealed that Lam also attended a wedding banquet, hosted by a former trade association vice-president.

== Post Chief Executive ==
In July 2022, several lawmakers criticised the fact that Lam's new office would cost taxpayers approximately HK$22.3 million over the next 3 years. In April 2023, her office had spent about HK$13.5 million since June 2022.

In November 2022, Lam said that her future plans included promoting "One country, two systems" to Taiwan.

In February 2023, Lam accepted the role of honorary president of the Hong Kong Chamber of Commerce in Jiangsu province.

== Personal life ==
In 1984, Carrie married Hong Kong mathematician Lam Siu-por, whom she met while studying at the University of Cambridge. He obtained his PhD in mathematics in 1983, under the supervision of Frank Adams.

Lam Siu-por used to teach at the Chinese University of Hong Kong and retired to England, but has since taught some short courses at the Capital Normal University in Beijing. The couple have two sons, Jeremy Lam Jit-si and Joshua Lam Yeuk-hay, both of whom studied in the United Kingdom. Joshua received his PhD in mathematics at Harvard University in the United States. Now he is a W2-Professor at the University of Bonn in Germany working on Number Theory and Algebraic Geometry.

Their eldest son Jeremy joined Xiaomi, an electronics and software company in Beijing in April 2016. Her husband and both sons are British citizens, while Lam herself renounced her British citizenship to take up the principal official post in the Hong Kong government in 2007. Lam maintained her Catholic faith through her political career; she refused to join the Chinese Communist Party as it would mean renouncing her Catholicism.

== Honours ==
In recognition of her "career achievements and contributions to the community", Lam was awarded the Gold Bauhinia Star and the Grand Bauhinia Medal in 2010 and 2016. In 2013 she was awarded an honorary degree of Doctor of Social Sciences by Lingnan University and was made an Officier de la Légion d’Honneur by the French government in 2015.

Lam also received an honorary fellowship from the Wolfson College, Cambridge for being "persons of distinction whom the College holds in high standing". In the 2019 anti-extradition bill protests, activists and politicians including three members of the House of Lords urged the university to revoke Lam's title, condemning her "hard line approach" against the protesters. On 15 August 2020, Lam announced on her Facebook page that she has returned her honorary fellowship as she states that, "I was very disappointed that the college slandered others in an unfounded and unreasonable manner. Therefore, it was difficult to persuade myself to continue to have any contact with Wolfson College, so I also returned the honorary academician title."

Wolfson College, which was already considering removing the title, responded that it had "raised concerns" about Lam's "commitment to the protection of human rights and the freedom of expression".

Lam is in the Press freedom predators list by Reporters Without Borders.

== See also ==
- 2019–20 Hong Kong protests
- Executive Council of Hong Kong
- Hong Kong national security law
- Lam government

Government offices
| Preceded by Leung Kin-pong | Director of Social Welfare; 2000–2003 | Succeeded by Paul Tang |
| Preceded by John Tsang | Permanent Secretary for Housing, Planning and Lands (Planning and Lands); 2003–2004 | Succeeded by Rita Lau |
| Preceded by Leung Kin-pong | Director-General of the Hong Kong Economic and Trade Office, London; 2004–2006 | Succeeded by Agnes Allcock |
| Preceded by Shelley Lee | Permanent Secretary for Home Affairs; 2006–2007 | Succeeded by Carrie Yau |
Political offices
| Preceded by Sarah Liao as Secretary for the Environment, Transport and Works | Secretary for Development; 2007–2012 | Succeeded by Mak Chai-kwong |
| Preceded by Michael Suen as Secretary for Housing, Planning and Lands | Secretary for Development; 2007–2012 | Succeeded by Mak Chai-kwong |
| Preceded by Stephen Lam | Chief Secretary for Administration; 2012–2017 | Succeeded by Matthew Cheung |
| Preceded by Leung Chun-ying | Chief Executive of Hong Kong; 2017–2022 | Succeeded by John Lee |
| Preceded by Leung Chun-ying | President of Executive Council; 2017–2022 | Succeeded by John Lee |
| New title | Chairperson of the Committee for Safeguarding National Security; 2020–2022 | Succeeded by John Lee |
Order of precedence
| Preceded by Leung Chun-ying; Former Chief Executive | Hong Kong order of precedence Former Chief Executive | Succeeded by Eric Chan; Chief Secretary for Administration |
