= Lily Yam =

Hong Kong government official (born 1946)

Lily Yam GBS JP
- 任關佩英
- Born: Lily Kwan Pui-ying; July 6, 1946 (age 79); Hong Kong
- Education: Sacred Heart Canossian College
- Alma mater: University of Hong Kong; Harvard University
- Occupation: Civil Servant

Lily Yam
- Traditional Chinese: 任關佩英
- Simplified Chinese: 任关佩英
Transcriptions
Standard Mandarin
- Hanyu Pinyin: Rén Guān Pèiyīng
Yue: Cantonese
- Yale Romanization: Yahm Gwāan Pui yīng
- Jyutping: Jam^{6} Gwaan^{1} Pui^{3} jing^{1}

Lily Yam Kwan Pui-ying GBS JP (Chinese: 任關佩英; née Kwan; born 6 July 1946) is a former top Hong Kong civil servant.

== Biography ==
Lily Kwan was born in Hong Kong in 1947, the fourth of six children. She attended Sacred Heart Canossian College until 1964, and later graduated from the University of Hong Kong in 1969 with a BA in English Language and Literature. After her marriage, she was known as Lily Yam. She joined the Hong Kong Government as an Administrative Officer upon her graduation in the same year. She has served in various departments and bureaux in her civil service career, including the ICAC, the Education and Manpower Branch of the Government Secretariat, the Civil Service Branch of the Government Secretariat, the Television and Entertainment Licensing Authority, the Central Policy Unit and the Secretariat for the Standing Commission on Civil Service Salaries and Conditions of Service.

Before taking up her appointment as the Commissioner for the Independent Commission Against Corruption in April 1997, she was Commissioner for Transport between 1995 and 1997. She headed the Environment and Food Bureau (which was later merged with the Health and Welfare Bureau to form the Health, Welfare and Food Bureau in 2002) between January 2000 and June 2002, when she retired. She was awarded the Gold Bauhinia Star (G.B.S.) in 2002 and appointed as Non-official Justices of the Peace in 2003.

== Education ==
Yam graduated from the University of Hong Kong in 1969 obtaining a BA degree in English Language and Literature and a master's degree in Public Administration from Harvard University in 1984.

Political offices
Preceded by Urban Council and Regional Council	Secretary for Environment and Food; 2000–2002	Succeeded by Yeoh Eng-kiong as Secretary for Health, Welfare and Food
Preceded by Gordon Siu as Secretary for Planning, Environment and Lands	Secretary for Environment and Food; 2000–2002	Succeeded by Sarah Liao as Secretary for the Environment, Transport and Works
Civic offices
Preceded by Michael Leung	Commissioner, Independent Commission Against Corruption; 1997–1999	Succeeded by Alan Lai
Order of precedence
Preceded by Edmund Tse; Recipients of the Gold Bauhinia Star	Hong Kong order of precedence Recipients of the Gold Bauhinia Star	Succeeded by Lee Shing-see; Recipients of the Gold Bauhinia Star
