= IBond =

Hong Kong bond

iBond (Chinese: 通脹掛鈎債券; SEHK: 4208, 4214, 4218, 4222, 4228, 4231) is a Hong Kong dollar retail inflation-indexed bond issued by the Hong Kong Government. There have been eight series issued, with the most recent in 2021. The first issuance was announced in the 2011–2012 Hong Kong budget John Tsang, the fourth by the Financial Secretary since the Hong Kong handover.

The rate for each interest payment will be determined by the year-on-year inflation rate of Hong Kong, which according to the Hong Kong Composite Consumer Price Index, with the lower limit of 1% return. The first iBonds were listed on Hong Kong Stock Exchange to listing on 29 July 2011. The offered issue amount is HK$10,000,000,000.
