= John Tsang =

Hong Kong politician (born 1951)

The Honourable John Tsang Chun-wah GBM, JP
- 曾俊華
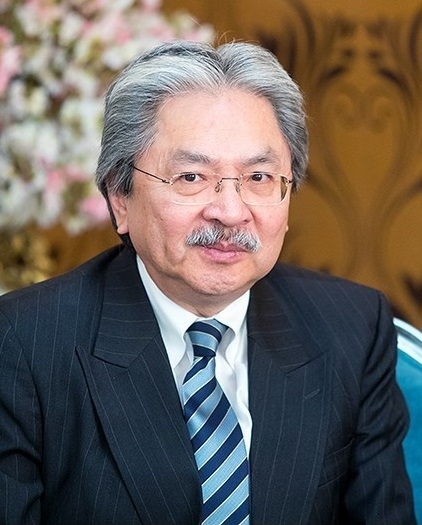
- Tsang in 2016

4th Financial Secretary of Hong Kong
- In office 1 July 2007 – 16 January 2017
- Chief Executive: Donald Tsang; Leung Chun-ying
- Preceded by: Henry Tang
- Succeeded by: Paul Chan

Director of the Chief Executive's Office
- In office 24 January 2006 – 30 June 2007
- Chief Executive: Donald Tsang
- Preceded by: Lam Woon-kwong
- Succeeded by: Norman Chan

2nd Secretary for Commerce, Industry and Technology
- In office 4 August 2003 – 24 January 2006
- Chief Executive: Tung Chee-hwa; Donald Tsang
- Preceded by: Henry Tang
- Succeeded by: Joseph Wong
Other offices
Secretary for Planning and Lands
In office 16 July 2001 – 30 June 2002
Preceded by	Gordon Siu
Succeeded by	Position Abolished; Michael Suen as Secretaries for Housing, Planning and Lands
Commissioner of Customs and Excise
In office 1999–2001
Preceded by	Li Shu-fai
Succeeded by	Raymond Wong

Personal details
- Born: Mui Chun-wah; 21 April 1951 (age 75) Kowloon Tong, Hong Kong
- Citizenship: American (1965–1998); Chinese (Hong Kong) (since 1997)
- Spouse: Wong Lynn Wah (m. 1972)
- Children: Terence · Prudence
- Parent(s): Tsang Cheuk-ho; Li Pik-sheung
- Education: La Salle College; Stuyvesant High School
- Alma mater: Massachusetts Institute of Technology (BS); Boston State College (MA); Harvard University (MPA)

John Tsang
- Traditional Chinese: 曾俊華
- Simplified Chinese: 曾俊华
Transcriptions
Standard Mandarin
- Hanyu Pinyin: Zēng Jùnhuá
- IPA: [tsə́ŋ tɕwə̂n xwǎ]
Yue: Cantonese
- Yale Romanization: Jāng Jeun wàh
- Jyutping: Zang^{1} Zeon^{3} waa^{4}
- IPA: [tsɐŋ˥ tsɵn˧ wa˩]

John Tsang Chun-wah, GBM, JP (Chinese: 曾俊華; born Mui; born 21 April 1951) is a Hong Kong former senior civil servant and government official who was the longest-serving Financial Secretary of Hong Kong SAR to date, from 2007 to 2017.

Born in Hong Kong and raised and educated in the United States, Tsang received a bachelor's degree in architecture from the Massachusetts Institute of Technology and a master in public administration from Harvard University. Tsang returned to Hong Kong and joined the government in 1982. He was the private secretary to the last colonial governor Chris Patten. After the handover, he served as Secretary for Commerce, Industry and Technology from 2003 to 2006 and as director of the Office of the Chief Executive in Donald Tsang administration from 2006 to 2007.

In July 2007, he was appointed Financial Secretary of Hong Kong by Donald Tsang. He proposed the Scheme $6,000 tax rebate to all Hong Kong residents in his 2011 Budget. He continued to serve as Financial Secretary in the Leung Chun-ying administration until January 2017, when he resigned to run in the 2017 Chief Executive election. Despite his lead in the opinion poll by large margin throughout the campaign, he lost the bid to Carrie Lam.

Tsang is currently engaged in a number of diverse activities. He is founder of Esperanza (a non-profit organisation), vice chairman of Ion Pacific (a financial institution that specialises in technology investments), senior advisor of Bowtie (a virtual insurance company), host of a weekly music programme on the private Commercial Radio, and fencing coach of the secondary school La Salle College.

== Early life and education ==
Tsang was born on 21 April 1951 at Maternity home in Dukes Street, Kowloon Tong in Hong Kong, his great-grandfather was from Taishan, Guangdong, who made his fortune beginning as a labourer in San Francisco. His grandfather was a well-off Chinese physician-turned-businessman. His father, Tsang Chuek-ho, was the eldest child of eight siblings. Graduated from normal schools, Tsang Chuek-ho and his wife Li Pik-sheung planned to move to the United States, where his sister was living, through Hong Kong in the 1940s.

While waiting for the immigration process, the family settled in Hong Kong and had four children. Tsang Cheuk-ho and his children adapted the surname Mui when he was adopted by a relative in Hong Kong; they reverted to their original surname after emigrating to the United States. John Tsang, the eldest child, was born as Mui Chun-wah in Hong Kong on 21 April 1951 and lived in Sai Yeung Choi Street in his childhood.

Tsang was a primary and secondary school student at La Salle Primary School and La Salle College in Hong Kong. When he was 13 in 1965, Tsang and his family moved to the United States. He first resided on the 8th Street in Lower East Side, Manhattan, New York City. He enrolled in Stuyvesant High School the following year, from which he graduated in 1969. Eric Holder, the first African-American Attorney General of the United States, was his classmate. During the early 1970s in the United States, he was involved in the defend the Diaoyu Islands movement.

He then studied architecture at the Massachusetts Institute of Technology. He also holds a master's degree in bilingual education from Boston State College and a Master in Public Administration from the Kennedy School of Government at Harvard University.

== Civil service career ==
Through his teens and twenties, Tsang lived in the United States and worked as an architect. In November 1982, he returned to Hong Kong after working with the Boston Public Schools Board as a special advisor, at the midst of the Sino-British negotiation over Hong Kong sovereignty, and joined the civil service under the encouragement of Donald Tsang, with whom he became friends when they were at Harvard together. He started his civil service as an Administrative Officer in 1982, in which his first position was a two-year stint to 1984 as Assistant District Officer for Shatin, serving under Donald Tsang, the District Officer. He went on to serve in the former Finance Branch, Monetary Affairs Branch and the former Trade Department. From 1987 to 1992, he was first Administrative Assistant to then Financial Secretary, Sir Piers Jacobs.

He was Assistant Director-General of Trade from 1992 to 1995 and Private Secretary to the Governor, Chris Patten, from March 1995 to June 1997. In July 1997, Tsang was appointed Director-General of the Hong Kong Economic and Trade Office in London. In 1999 he returned from London and assumed the office of Commissioner of Customs and Excise, appointed by then Chief Executive Tung Chee-hwa. Tsang was Secretary for Planning and Lands from 2001 to 2002. After the Principal Officials Accountability System was introduced in July 2002, his title was changed to the Permanent Secretary for Housing, Planning and Lands (Planning and Lands), Permanent Secretary having become the highest ranking in the Hong Kong Civil Service.

From August 2003, Tsang served as Secretary for Commerce, Industry and Technology. In this role he was also Chair of the Sixth Ministerial Conference of the World Trade Organization, held in Hong Kong from 13 to 18 December 2005. For his outstanding performance in the World Trade Organization, he received the praise from Hu Jintao, general secretary of the Chinese Communist Party.

Tsang then became the director of the Office of the Chief Executive, working directly for his friend Donald Tsang. He held the post from 2006 to June 2007.

== Financial Secretary ==
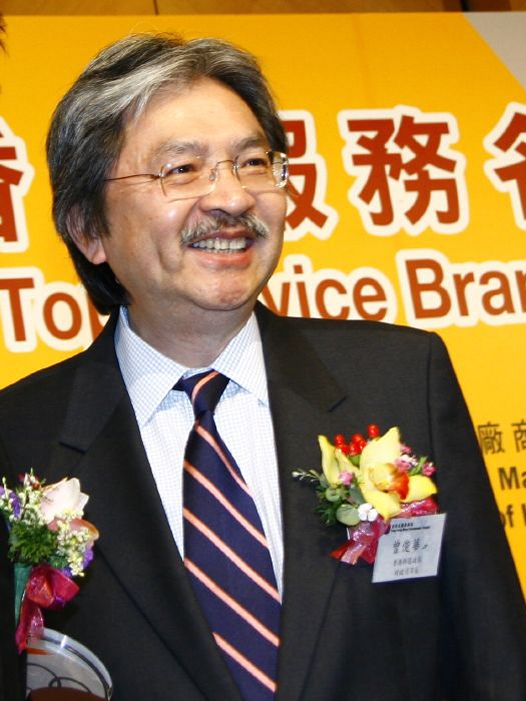
Tsang in 2010

In 2007, Tsang was appointed Financial Secretary of Hong Kong when Donald Tsang began his second term. In 2012, he was re-appointed as the territory's financial chief by Leung Chun-ying. Although Hong Kong's economy generally grew at a stable rate under Tsang and the government recorded surpluses every year, Tsang was criticised for his drastic miscalculations of the government's surpluses and his fiscal conservative philosophy.

After seven consecutive years of budget surplus, Tsang's 2011 annual budget came under heavy fire from the Legislative Council. His original proposal of putting HK$6,000 directly into workers' Mandatory Provident Fund (MPF) accounts was condemned. About 10,000 protesters demonstrated in Central. The mismanagement of the funds led to a number of controversies. Tsang eventually backed down and carried out the Scheme $6,000 to give a HK$6,000 cash handout to all adult holders of a Hong Kong permanent identity card. In the same budget, Tsang initiated iBond, a Hong Kong dollar retail inflation-indexed bond to further develop the local bonds market, attracting 155,835 applications in 2011, which rose to 525,359 by 2013.

In January 2011, the government's IT chief information officer Jeremy Godfrey stepped down from his job for "personal reasons". On 10 May 2011, in a letter to the Legislative Council, he said the real reasons why he resigned were related to Permanent Secretary for Permanent Secretary for Commerce and Economic Development Elizabeth Tse and John Tsang. It turns out that there had been arguments over the implementation of the Internet Learning Support Program (ILSP). It was revealed that Tse and Tsang had forced the HK$220 million contract to be awarded to a company called Internet Professional Association (iProA). This company was founded by Elizabeth Quat, a member of the pro-Beijing Democratic Alliance for the Betterment and Progress of Hong Kong (DAB). Tsang responded that the accusations were ridiculous and absurd. Godfrey then stated that Quat herself had nothing to do with the ILSP controversy, but said the IT decision was politicised.

In the 2013 budget, Tsang said he understood the people's concerns because he himself was a member of the middle class. He supported this claim by saying middle-class people are those who drink coffee and enjoy French films. He was ridiculed by the public for the remarks, given that he earned a basic monthly salary of HK$302,205 and lived in a luxury government residence.

On 7 December 2013, Tsang was hit in the head by an egg thrown by a League of Social Democrats (LSD) protester, Derek Chan Tak-cheung, at a government forum. Tsang joked about the incident, saying that a doctor had advised him not to eat too many eggs. "Luckily I'm not wearing a good suit today. I appear to have foreseen the incident."

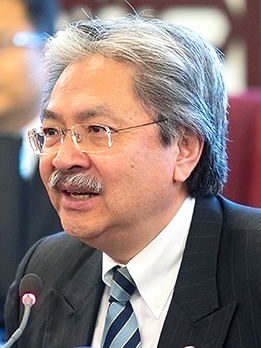
Tsang in 2016

To distance himself from Chief Executive Leung Chun-ying, who took a hardline stance against localism in Hong Kong, Tsang expressed his affection for local culture, especially by showing his support for the Hong Kong national football team against China during the World Cup football qualifiers. He also wrote in his blog that localism could become a "strong and constructive force" that binds society together. His popularity rating had been over 60 out of 100 in 2015 and 2016, according to tracking polls by the University of Hong Kong public opinion programme, being the most popular principal official in the government.

Tsang resigned as Financial Secretary on 12 December following months of speculation that he would run in the 2017 Chief Executive election during which he led opinion polls against incumbent Chief Executive Leung Chun-ying. His resignation was approved by Beijing's central authorities on 16 January 2017, the same day his rival Carrie Lam resigned from her post as Chief Secretary for Administration. The unusual month-long gap between his resignation and Beijing's approval caused critics to speculate that Beijing was reluctant to allow him to join the race.

== 2017 Chief Executive bid ==
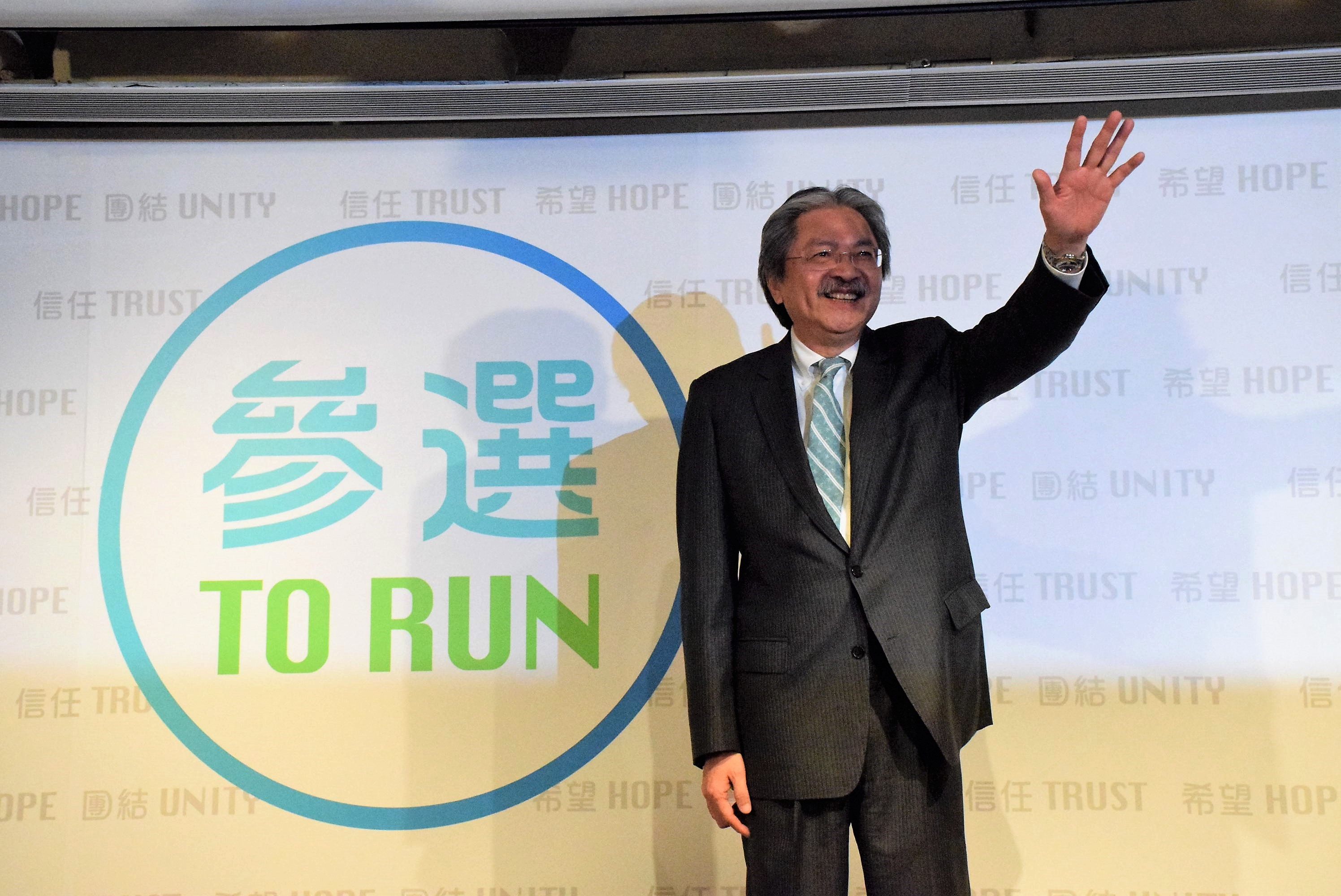
Tsang officially declared his Chief Executive candidacy on 19 January 2017.

Tsang officially declared his candidacy on 19 January with a slogan of "Trust, Unity, Hope", after more than a month-long pending of his resignation by the central government which put his campaign in limbo. There were reports that central government officials had given "red light" to John Tsang running in the election and had allegedly asked John Tsang not to run for more than ten times, including rumours of him being offered the deputy governor post at the Asian Infrastructure Investment Bank in return for not joining the race. Tsang refuted such claims, only saying that there were "friends" who supported him and some who did not. To contrast his archrival former Chief Secretary Carrie Lam who was perceived to follow Leung Chun-ying's hardline and divisive policies, Tsang described himself as a good listener who accepted different views, appealing to "all 7.35 million Hongkongers so that together we can make Hong Kong a better place." Tsang also launched his election Facebook page, which drew more than 100,000 likes in a day.

Tsang unveiled his 75-page election platform entitled "Convergence of Hearts, Proactive Enablement" on 6 February, with the promise of revisiting the possibility of the Article 23 national security legislation with the possibility of relaunching political reform without mentioning the "831 framework". Other policies included introducing a progressive profit tax, developing New Territories North and East Lantau and abolishing all Territory-wide System Assessment (TSA) and Basic Competency Assessment (BCA) tests, among others.

Amid the alleged pressure from the Liaison Office which actively lobbied for Carrie Lam and speculations that he was not Beijing's favoured candidate, Tsang struggled to seek nominations from the pro-Beijing electors and had to heavily rely on the Democrats. He received a few pro-Beijing electors' support, including Liberal Party honorary chairman James Tien who was the most outspoken supporter of Tsang since the early stage of the campaign, as well as the party's honorary chairwoman Selina Chow and leader Felix Chung. He also received a nomination from Thomas Wu, son of real estate tycoon Gordon Wu of the Hopewell Holdings, the only tycoon to nominate Tsang. 123 of his total number of 160 nominations came from pro-democracy camp, of which majority of them were from the professional sector, including the Democratic Party which made it the first time a pro-democratic party to nominate an establishment candidate. On 25 February, he became the first candidate to submit his nominations. He was criticised by pro-Beijing media and politicians for taking pro-democrats' support, Tam Yiu-chung said that Tsang now clearly represented the pan-democrats while Ta Kung Pao editorials attacked Tsang for "making deal with the devils".

Tsang performed well in the election debates. In a two-hour televised debate co-organised by seven electronic media outlets on 14 March, Tsang quoted Lam's nickname "CY 2.0", which meant the second version of the divisive incumbent Leung Chun-ying, saying that people fear society will suffer "split 2.0" if Lam wins. Former candidate Regina Ip and political scientist Ma Ngok said that Tsang won the debate. According to a poll conducted by the University of Hong Kong Public Opinion Programme (HKUPOP) after a forum co-organised by a group of Election Committee members on 19 March 62 per cent out of the 717 respondents said they would vote for Tsang if eligible, against 24 per cent for Lam and seven per cent for Woo.

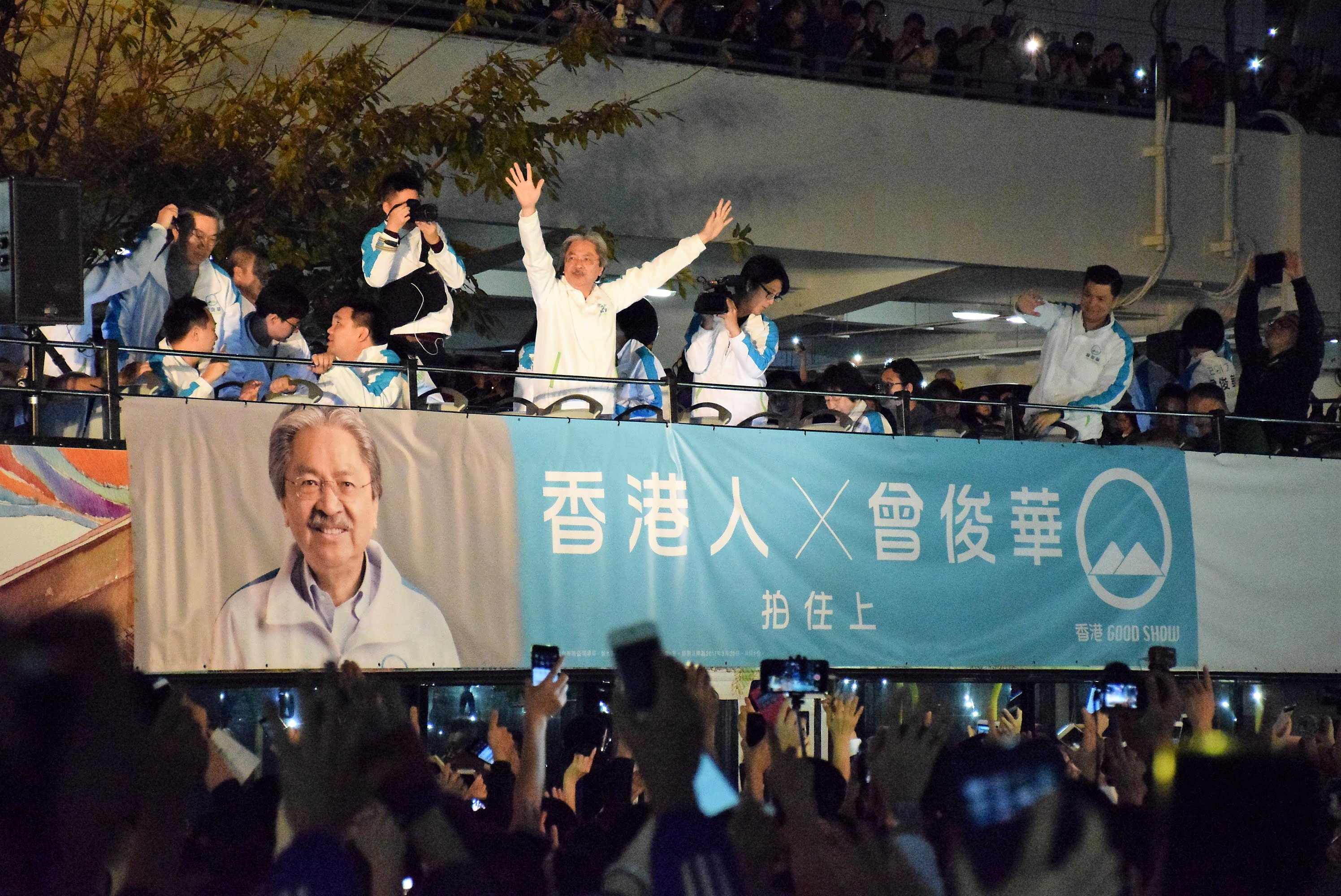
Tsang's campaign rally on 24 March in Edinburgh Place, Central was attended by around 3,500 supporters.

Ahead of 26 March election, Tsang held a rally on 24 March evening in Edinburgh Place, Central, the final stop on his half-day bus parade on Hong Kong Island. Around 3,500 showed support at the rally, with some 449,000 people watched the rally on his Facebook page and more than 18,700 comments were left on the page. Film director Johnnie To, Tsang's wife Lynn and his former political assistant Julian Law Wing-chung were among the six guests who spoke at the rally. In Tsang's speech, he said: "We are here to show our love for this city of ours ... I hope the Election Committee members, who have the power to vote, would heed our call and heal the rift, and make Hong Kong the home we imagined it should be." He also made a reference to the 2014 Occupy protests, saying: "Here we stand near Lung Wo Road and Connaught Road, Occupy happened near this place in more than two years ago, but I hope our rally today can give a new meaning to this place. I hope you will remembered that on 24 March 2017, we gathered here for the unity of Hong Kong."

On 26 March, Tsang received 365 votes in the 1,194-member Election Committee, losing to Carrie Lam who received 777 votes. His votes came from 98 percent of the 325-member "Democrats 300+" coalition, who voted as masse for the candidate leading in opinion polls, as well as a few pro-Beijing electors. Tsang fought back tears as he implored supporters to carry on the dream for democracy and not to give up on Hong Kong in his concession speech. "I believe this dream to turn Hong Kong more democratic ... has made every Hongkonger willing to dream on – till our dream comes true one day."

== Post-election life ==
In late October 2017, Tsang again gained media attention when it was reported that a RTHK 10-episode show titled Hong Kong Stories in which Tsang was a voluntary guest host would be suspended from airing as he had failed to declare this employment after leaving the government. Chief Executive Carrie Lam urged Tsang to "respect the system" like other officials to declare his employment accordingly. Tsang revealed that he had been in touch with permanent secretary Jessie Ting Yip Yin-mei at Chief Executive Carrie Lam's office as early as mid-September regarding the television series and provided information as requested.

In March 2018, John Tsang announced plans to establish a fund to help young entrepreneurs in Hong Kong. He wants to match his experienced and knowledgeable network of contact with aspiring entrepreneurs. He also joined a fintech-focused merchant bank Ion Pacific as its vice-chairman and Benefit Vantage Limited (BVL) as a chairman and investor in June 2018. BVL's main focus is cybersecurity and they are currently taking their authentication solution IPification to the market.

In 2020, Tsang co-founded middle-of-the-road political group "Hope for Hong Kong", signaling his change of political stance from pro-Beijing to centrism. He also appeared in "In Geek We Trust", a drama of ViuTV in 2022.

== Personal life ==
Tsang is married to Lynn Tsang (曾黃蓮華; née Wong) who he met as a nurse while doing volunteer work in the United States in 1975. The couple have a son Terence Tiu-lung (雕龍; literally "carving of dragons") and a daughter Prudence Man-sum (文心; literally "literary mind"); the combination of the siblings' names alludes to The Literary Mind and the Carving of Dragons, a Chinese classic on literary aesthetics. The family remained a low profile despite Tsang's senior political position.

Tsang is a practicing Roman Catholic and a martial arts and fencing enthusiast. He learned Hung Kuen with martial arts master Kwong Tit-fu during his life in the United States and got to know Tai Chi master Bow-sim Mark and her son Donnie Yen. He has been voluntarily coaching the fencing team of his alma mater La Salle College since 1985, Sammy Leung was among his students. He also cameoed as a fencing coach in a government's tourism promotion video. He is also nicknamed "Mr Potato Chips" and "Uncle Pringles" for a moustache similar to one worn by a character on a potato crisp brand's packaging. He has a pet dog Shiba Inu named Oliver, in which he gave to his daughter as a Christmas present in 2008. Oliver is often featured in Tsang's greeting cards.

In 2009, Tsang suffered a health scare on his return from a G-20 summit in Pittsburgh. On 27 September he was admitted to Queen Mary Hospital with a coronary artery blockage and underwent an angioplasty operation. He recovered and was discharged from hospital on 3 October, assuring the media that the operation would not affect his work.

Civic offices
Preceded by Li Shu-fai	Commissioner of Customs and Excise; 1999–2001	Succeeded by Raymond Wong
Government offices
Preceded by Gordon Siu	Secretary for Planning and Lands; 2001–2002	Succeeded by Michael Suen as Secretary for Housing, Planning and Lands
New office	Permanent Secretary for Housing, Planning and Lands (Planning and Lands); 2002–2003	Succeeded by Carrie Lam
Preceded by Lam Woon-kwong	Director of the Chief Executive's Office; 2006–2007	Succeeded by Norman Chan
Political offices
Preceded by Henry Tang	Secretary for Commerce, Industry and Technology; 2003–2006	Succeeded by Joseph Wong
Preceded by Henry Tang	Financial Secretary of Hong Kong; 2007–2017	Succeeded by Paul Chan
Order of precedence
Preceded by Henry Tang; Recipient of the Grand Bauhinia Medal	Hong Kong order of precedence Recipient of the Grand Bauhinia Medal	Succeeded by Ronald Arculli; Recipient of the Grand Bauhinia Medal
