= York Liao =

York Liao, MBE, SBS, JP (born ca. 1948) is a Chinese-born Hong Kong government official and businessman, who is or has been:

- a managing director of Winbridge Company Limited, a private investment and consultancy company
- an Independent Non-Executive Director of Hang Lung Group Ltd (since October 2003)
- a Non-Executive Director of Armitage Technologies Holding Ltd (since February 2002)
- a cofounder (along with Dr C C Chang and Mr James Lee) of Varitronix International Ltd in 1978, one of the first manufacturers of LCD.

== Affiliations ==
- City Polytechnic (now City University) Council
- University of Science and Technology Council
- University Grants Committee (the overseeing body appointed by the government for the funding of tertiary education in Hong Kong)
- Industrial and Technology Development Council
- Hong Kong Industrial Technology Center, government-sponsored incubation center
- California Institute of Technology ("Caltech") Board of Trustees (since 1998)

== Education ==
Born in China and raised in Hong Kong, Liao came to the United States to attend Caltech, where he earned a BS in physics in 1967. He continued his studies in applied physics at Harvard University, and was awarded an MA (1968) and a Ph.D. (1973).

== Personal life ==
York Liao is married and has three children. His sister is Dr. Sarah Liao.
