= Sarah Liao =

Hong Kong government official (born 1951)

Sarah Liao Sau-tung GBS, MBE, JP
- 廖秀冬

Secretary for the Environment, Transport and Works
- In office 1 August 2002 – 30 June 2007

Personal details
- Born: 25 December 1951 (age 74)
- Spouse: Gordon Siu (m. 1973; div. 1991)
- Children: 2
- Education: University of Hong Kong; University of Birmingham; Diocesan Girls' School

Sarah Liao
- Chinese: 廖秀冬
- Hanyu Pinyin: Liào Xiùdōng
- Yale Romanization: Liuh Sau dūng
- Jyutping: Liu^{6} Sau^{3} dung^{1}

Dr. Sarah Mary Liao Sau-tung GBS JP MBE FRSC (born 25 December 1951) was former Secretary for the Environment, Transport and Works of the Hong Kong Special Administrative Region and a member of the Executive Council of Hong Kong since 2002. She was appointed on 1 August 2002 and served until 2007. She is also a Senior Adviser to the Vice-Chancellor of the University of Hong Kong on Environmental and Sustainability Matters.

== Early life and career ==
=== Education ===
Sarah Mary Liao graduated from the Diocesan Girls' School and earned her bachelor's degree (chemistry and botany), master's degree (inorganic chemistry) and doctorate (environmental/occupational health) from the University of Hong Kong. She was also awarded a master's degree (analytical chemistry) by the University of Birmingham. Her brother is Dr. York Liao, a prominent Hong Kong businessman and councillor.

She is a Fellow of the Royal Society of Chemistry and an Honorary Professor in Civil Engineering at the University of Hong Kong. During her university years, Liao joined St. John's College as a residential member from 1970 and has served as the female sports captain from 1971–72.

=== Early career ===
Liao's career in environmental protection began in 1976 at the University of Hong Kong when she supervised the first government-funded annual air monitoring project. This program was designed to provide extensive background environmental data, which continued for five years. She then spent over seven years establishing and administering the program on Environmental Health & Safety at the University. Another area of work was the management of toxic and hazardous materials (chemical and biological) used in the University, including the procurement, storage, delivery, use, pre-disposal treatment and final disposal of these substances. At the same time she conducted large scale studies relating to workplace health and safety, hazard identification, risk assessment and environmental problems in a range of Hong Kong industries.

== Professional and political career ==
=== Environmental consulting ===
In 1988 Liao founded EHS Consultants Limited which provided a range of environmental services requiring specialist expertise. Projects in the 1990s included a comprehensive asbestos management consultancy for the Housing Authority, producing drafting instructions for the Asbestos Regulations under the Air Pollution Control Amendment Bill, major environmental impact assessments relating to Port and Airport Developments, and a territory-wide study on Indoor Air Quality. In 1997, EHS Consultants Limited merged with CH2M HILL Ltd., a US-based environmental consultancy firm with 12,000-employee and US$1.7 billion revenue, and Liao became the managing director for Greater China. Recent projects included the study on air quality in the Pearl River Delta, Toxic Substances and pollution in HK waters.

=== The 2008 Beijing's Olympic Bidding and Organizing Committees ===
Liao was the senior environmental adviser to Beijing's Olympic Bidding and Organizing Committees from 1999–2008. She was a member of the bidding committee to represent Beijing at the 2008 Olympic Bidding conference in Moscow on 13 July 2001.

=== The Government of the Hong Kong Special Administrative Region ===
Liao was named Secretary for the Environment, Transport and Works in August 2002 as part of Tung Chee Hwa's Principal Officials Accountability System. The portfolio covered environmental protection, transport services and safety management, road and rail infrastructure, water supply, slope safety and flood prevention, electrical and mechanical and architectural services, and a public works program averaging HK$27b per year. Upon her government appointment, there were concerns about her close relations with Beijing and her close links to the tobacco industry.

Liao tackled air pollution head-on by the imposition of emission caps on power stations, and worked with Guangdong to successfully institutionalise emission trading and setting up the first regional air monitoring network.

Liao also implemented the polluters- pay- principle in both solid waste and wastewater, produced a 10-year framework for waste management, encouraged private-public partnerships for private lands to conserve nature while greening of the urban areas was systematically carried out under a territory-wide master plan.

On the transport side, Liao commissioned three new railways, initiated and completed the merger of the two railway companies in HK, and facilitated cross-boundary traffic by building the Lok Ma Chau railway and the Shenzhen Western Crossing where the first co-location of immigration facilities is implemented. She commissioned and implemented the public transportation fare adjustment scheme to help lift the objectivity and transparency of bus fare adjustments. The scheme, although heavily debated, allowed the public to have visibility to major transportation companies' fare policies in relations to micro and macro economic trends and indicators. She has consistently achieved high approval rates in public opinion polls.

== Post-retirement ==
Liao is a member of the China Council for International Cooperation on Environment and Development (CCICED), an Environmental Adviser to the Shanghai Municipal Government on the Shanghai World Expo 2010, a Senior Adviser to the Vice-Chancellor of The University of Hong Kong on Environmental and Sustainability Matters, a trustee on the Board of Trustees of the Environmental Defense Fund (EDF), and a member of the School Council of the St. Stephen's Girls' College of Hong Kong.

== Professional appointments and awards ==
=== Appointments ===
(highlights)

1999 – 2011: Member, Central Policy Unit
1995 – 2000: Member, Building Committee, Hong Kong Housing Authority
1994 – 1996: Member, The Pacific Business Forum (PBF) of Asia-Pacific Economic Cooperation (APEC)
1993 – 1998: Board of Governors, Friends of the Earth, Hong Kong
1993 – 1994: Deputy chairman, Urban Growth & the Environment, World Congress 1994
1990 – 1996: Chairman, Research and Testing Committee, Consumer Council, Hong Kong
1987 – 1996: Member, Consumer Council, Hong Kong

=== Other awards and recognitions ===
2007: Gold Bauhinia Star, Hong Kong SAR.
1997: Member in the Most Excellent Order of the British Empire
1994: Appointed Non-official Justice of the Peace of the Hong Kong Government

== See also ==
- List of graduates of University of Hong Kong

Political offices
Preceded by Lily Yam as Secretary for the Environment and Food	Secretary for the Environment, Transport and Works; 2002–2007	Succeeded by Edward Yau as Secretary for the Environment
Preceded by Nicholas Ng as Secretary for Transport	Secretary for the Environment, Transport and Works; 2002–2007	Succeeded by Eva Cheng as Secretary for Transport and Housing
Preceded by Lee Shing-see as Secretary for Works	Secretary for the Environment, Transport and Works; 2002–2007	Succeeded by Carrie Lam as Secretary for Development
Order of precedence
Preceded by Patrick Ho; Recipients of the Gold Bauhinia Star	Hong Kong order of precedence Recipients of the Gold Bauhinia Star	Succeeded by Lee Ming-kwai; Recipients of the Gold Bauhinia Star
