= Kwong Hon-sang =

Hong Kong government official (1938–2019)

- Traditional Chinese: 鄺漢生
- Simplified Chinese: 邝汉生
Transcriptions
Standard Mandarin
- Hanyu Pinyin: Kuàng Hànshēng
Yue: Cantonese
- Jyutping: kwong3 hon3 saang1

Ir Kwong Hon-sang, GBS, JP (Chinese: 鄺漢生; 7 August 1938 – 14 February 2019) was a Hong Kong government official. He was the Secretary for Works from 1995 to 1999.

Kwong was born in 1938 and was educated at the Wah Yan College, Kowloon. He obtained a Bachelor of Science in Engineering from the University of Hong Kong in 1963 and a Master of Science from the University of Birmingham on Transportation and Environmental Planning. He joined the Public Works Department of the Hong Kong government in 1963, where he was involved in the traffic management and technology as well as various highway projects. He became the director of the Lantau Link (Tsing Ma Bridge) project in March 1992. He served as Director of Highways from 3 December 1993. In 1995, he became Secretary for Works until his retirement in 1999.

Kwong was a former president of the HKU Engineering Alumni Association and the president of the Hong Kong Institution of Highways and Transportation. He was also a council member of the Hong Kong Academy of Engineering Science, and a member of the Hong Kong Institution of Engineers.

Kwong died on 14 February 2019, aged 80.

Government offices
Preceded by Kwei See-kan	Director of Highways; 1993–1995	Succeeded by Leung Kwok-sun
Preceded by Ronald James Blake	Secretary for Works; 1995–1999	Succeeded by Lee Shing-see
