= Secretary for Environment and Ecology =

Hong Kong Special Administrative Region Secretary for Environment and Ecology 環境及生態局局長
- Emblem of Hong Kong

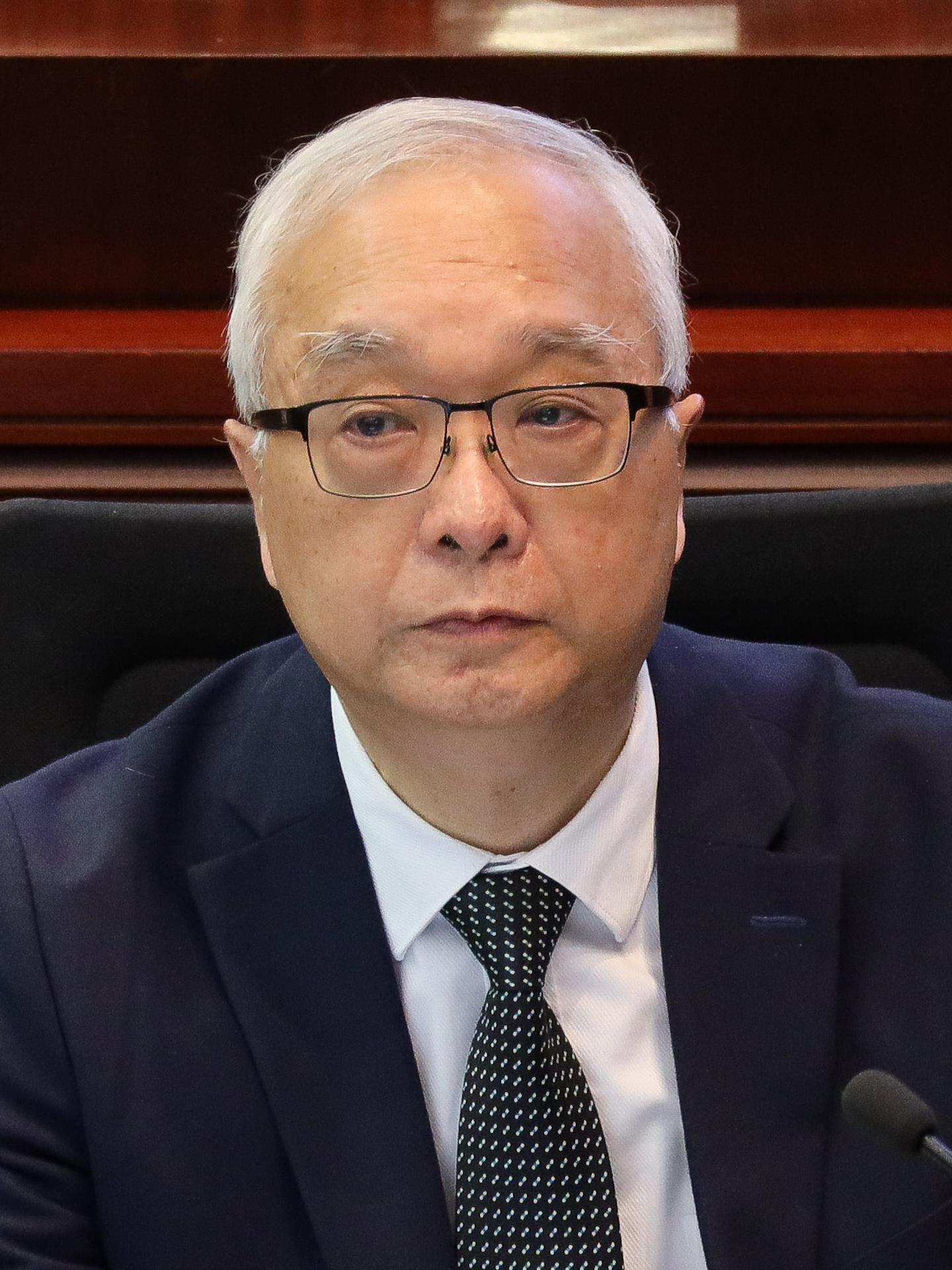
- Incumbent; Tse Chin-wan since 1 July 2022
- Environment and Ecology Bureau
- Style: The Honourable
- Appointer: Central People's Government nomination by Chief Executive
- Inaugural holder: Gordon Siu; Secretary for Planning, the Environment and Lands; Edward Yau; Secretary for the Environment
- Formation: 1 July 1997; 1 July 2007
- Salary: HK$4,021,200 per annum
- Website: EEB

Secretary for Environment and Ecology
- Traditional Chinese: 環境及生態局局長
Transcriptions

The Secretary for Environment and Ecology (Chinese: 環境及生態局局長) of the Hong Kong Government is responsible for environment protection policy in Hong Kong. The position was created most recently in 2007 as the Secretary for the Environment to replace portions of the previous portfolio of Secretary for the Environment, Transport and Works.

On 1 July 2022, the position renamed with the absorption of the food and environmental hygiene portfolio from the Secretary for Food and Health.

The position was renamed various times to include different portfolios, including Secretary for the Environment, Transport and Works (Chinese: 環境運輸及工務局局長), who heads the Environment, Transport and Works Bureau of the Hong Kong Government, responsible for public works projects, transport related issues and environmental protection.

== List of office holders ==
Political party: Nonpartisan

=== Secretaries for the Environment, 1973–1981 ===
No.	Portrait	Name	Term of office		Governor	Ref
1		James Jeavons Robson 盧秉信	June 1973	June 1976	Sir Murray MacLehose (1971–1982)	
2		Derek Jones 鍾信	June 1976	August 1981	Sir Murray MacLehose (1971–1982)	

=== Secretaries for Lands and Works, 1981–1989 ===
No.	Portrait	Name	Term of office		Governor	Ref
1		David Wylie McDonald 麥德霖	September 1981	July 1983	Sir Murray MacLehose (1971–1982)	
1		David Wylie McDonald 麥德霖	September 1981	July 1983	Sir Edward Youde (1982–1986)	
2		Chan Nai-keong 陳乃強	July 1983	15 August 1986	Sir Edward Youde (1982–1986)	
3		Graham Barnes 班禮士	16 August 1986	31 August 1989	Sir Edward Youde (1982–1986)	
3		Graham Barnes 班禮士	16 August 1986	31 August 1989	Sir David Wilson (1987–1992)	

=== Secretaries for Planning, Environment and Lands, 1989–1997 ===
No.	Portrait	Name	Term of office		Governor	Ref
1		Graham Barnes 班禮士	1 September 1989	31 March 1992	Sir David Wilson (1987–1992)	
2		Anthony Gordon Eason 伊信	1 April 1992	May 1995	Sir David Wilson (1987–1992)	
2		Anthony Gordon Eason 伊信	1 April 1992	May 1995	Chris Patten (1992–1997)	
3		Bowen Joseph Leung 梁寶榮	15 May 1995	30 June 1997	Chris Patten (1992–1997)	

=== Secretaries for Planning, Environment and Lands, 1997–1999 ===
No.	Portrait	Name	Term of office		Duration	Chief Executive	Term	Ref
1		Bowen Joseph Leung Po-wing 梁寶榮	1 July 1997	14 November 1998	197 days	Tung Chee-hwa (1997–2005)	1	
2		Gordon Siu Kwing-chue 蕭炯柱	21 January 1999	31 December 1999	344 days	Tung Chee-hwa (1997–2005)	1	

Planning affairs were handled by the Secretary for Planning and Lands between 2000 and 2002.

=== Secretaries for the Environment and Food, 2000–2002 ===
No.	Portrait	Name	Term of office		Duration	Chief Executive	Term	Ref
1		Lily Yam Kwan Pui-ying 任關佩英	1 July 2000	30 June 2002	1 year, 364 days	Tung Chee-hwa (1997–2005)	1	

=== Secretaries for the Environment, Transport and Works, 2002–2007 ===
No.	Portrait	Name	Term of office		Duration	Chief Executive	Term	Ref
1		Sarah Liao Sau-tung 廖秀冬	1 July 2002	30 June 2007	4 years, 364 days	Tung Chee-hwa (1997–2005)	2	
1		Sarah Liao Sau-tung 廖秀冬	1 July 2002	30 June 2007	4 years, 364 days	Donald Tsang (2005–2012)	2	

=== Secretaries for the Environment, 2007–2022 ===
No.	Portrait	Name	Term of office		Duration	Chief Executive	Term	Ref
1		Edward Yau Tang-wah 邱騰華	1 July 2007	30 June 2012	5 years, 0 days	Donald Tsang (2005–2012)	3	
2		Wong Kam-sing 黃錦星	1 July 2012	30 June 2022	10 years, 0 days	Leung Chun-ying (2012–2017)	4	
2		Wong Kam-sing 黃錦星	1 July 2012	30 June 2022	10 years, 0 days	Carrie Lam (2017–2022)	5	

=== Secretaries for Environment and Ecology, 2022–present ===
No.	Portrait	Name	Term of office		Duration	Chief Executive	Term	Ref
1		Tse Chin-wan 謝展寰	1 July 2022	Incumbent	4 years, 68 days	John Lee (2022–present)	6	

== See also ==
- Public Works Department (Hong Kong)
