= Lee Shing-see =

Lee Shing-see (Chinese: 李承仕; born 1942) is a businessman and former government official in Hong Kong.

== Biography ==
Lee graduated from the University of Hong Kong and joined the Hong Kong government in 1964. From August 1994 to August 1999 he was the Director of Territory Development and subsequently the Secretary for Works from August 1999 to August 2002.

After his retirement from the government, Lee held various public and business positions, including board member of the Hong Kong Airport Authority, director of Aviation Security Company, member of the Youth Education, Employment and Training Task Force of Commission on Poverty, chairman of the Construction Industry Council. He is also an independent non-executive director of the China State Construction International Holdings Limited. He is also a fellow of the Hong Kong Institution of Engineers and the Institution of Civil Engineers (UK).

Government offices
Preceded by Kwong Hon-sang	Secretary for Works; 1999–2002	Succeeded by Sarah Liao as Secretary for the Environment, Transport and Works
