= Bowen Leung =

Former Hong Kong civil servant

Bowen Joseph Leung Po-wing GBS, CBE, JP
- 梁寶榮
- Born: 18 September 1949 (age 76)
- Education: University of Hong Kong
- Occupation: Civil servant
- Years active: 1973 - 2005
- Title: Secretary for Planning, Environment and Lands; Office of the Government of the Hong Kong Special Administrative Region in Beijing
- Awards: Gold Bauhinia Star

Bowen Leung
- Traditional Chinese: 梁寶榮
- Yale Romanization: Lèuhng Bóu wìhng
- Jyutping: Loeng^{4} Bou^{2} wing^{4}

Bowen Joseph Leung Po-wing, GBS, CBE, JP (Chinese: 梁寶榮; born 18 September 1949) is a former Hong Kong civil servant. He was Secretary for Planning, Environment and Lands from 1995 to 1998 and Director of the Office of the Government of the Hong Kong Special Administrative Region in Beijing from 1998 to 2005.

Leung graduated with a bachelor's degree in Social Sciences from the University of Hong Kong in 1971. He joined the Administrative Service in June 1973 and rose to the rank of Administrative Officer Staff Grade A1 in June 1996. He served in various policy bureaux and departments, including Deputy Secretary for District Administration (later re-titled as Deputy Secretary for Home Affairs) from April 1987 to September 1990; Deputy Secretary for Planning, Environment and Lands from September 1990 to December 1992; Private Secretary of the Government House from December 1992 to March 1995; and Secretary for Planning, Environment and Lands from May 1995 to November 1998. In November 1998, he was appointed Director of the Office of the Government of the Hong Kong Special Administrative Region in Beijing ("Beijing Office") in which he served until his retirement in November 2005.

After his retirement, he served as independent non-executive directors of many companies including PYI Corporation Limited, Paliburg Holdings Limited, North Asia Resources Holdings Limited and Quali-Smart Holdings Limited, and a special adviser to the board of directors of Sands China Ltd.

Government offices
Preceded by Anthony Gordon Eason	Secretary for Planning, Environment and Lands; 1995–1998	Succeeded by Gordon Siu
