= Gordon Siu =

Hong Kong civil servant

Gordon Siu Kwing-chue CBE, GBS, JP
- 蕭炯柱
- Born: 1945 (age 80–81)
- Education: Birmingham University
- Occupation: Civil Servant
- Board member of: China Resources Beer (Holdings) Company Ltd. China Resources Enterprise Ltd. ICEA Finance Holdings Ltd. ICEA Securities Ltd. The Kowloon Motor Bus Ltd. Long Win Bus Company Ltd. Television Broadcasts Ltd. Transport International Holdings Ltd. Tung Shing Securities (Brokers) Ltd.

Gordon Siu Kwing-chue
- Traditional Chinese: 蕭炯柱
- Simplified Chinese: 萧炯柱
- Hanyu Pinyin: Xiāo Jiǒngzhù
- Yale Romanization: Sīu Gwíng chyúh
- Jyutping: Siu^{1} Gwing^{2} cyu^{5}

Gordon Siu Kwing-chue, CBE, GBS, JP (Chinese: 蕭炯柱; born 29 November 1945) is a former Hong Kong civil servant. From 1993 to 2001, he was secretary for economic services, secretary for transport, head of the Central Policy Unit and secretary for planning, environment and lands.

== Early life ==
Siu was born in 1945 and was educated at Birmingham University.

== Career ==
He joined the civil service as an administrative officer in 1966. He held various positions in the Hong Kong government, including the deputy secretary for the Civil Service from 1981 to 1985, secretary general of the Office of Members of the Executive and Legislative Councils from 1985 to 1988 and postmaster general from 1988 to 1992. In 1993, he was appointed secretary for economic services. During his service, he was responsible for promoting the construction of Chek Lap Kok Airport as the director of New Airport Projects Co-ordination Office, the construction plan of which became an issue of the Sino-British dispute on the eve of the handover. He was later appointed secretary for transport and head of the Central Policy Unit from 1997 to 1999 after the handover. He became secretary for planning, environment and lands in 1999 until he retired from the government in 2001. Siu was awarded the honours of Commander of the Most Excellent Order of the British Empire (CBE) in 1997 and Gold Bauhinia Star (GBS) in 2002 and appointed a non-official Justice of the Peace in 2003.

== Retirement ==
Since his retirement, he has held directorships in many companies, including China Resources Enterprise Ltd., Transport International Holdings Limited, China Resources Beer (Holdings) Company Limited, ICEA Finance Holdings Limited and ICEA Securities Limited, Tung Shing Securities (Brokers) Limited, Television Broadcasts Limited, The Kowloon Motor Bus (1933) Ltd. and Long Win Bus Company Limited, subsidiaries of Kowloon Motor Bus Co. Ltd.

== Other interests ==
He plays violin and joined the choir at school. He received a diploma from the Royal Academy of Music and joined the Hong Kong Youth Orchestra in 1964. He went on to become the concertmaster of the orchestra in 1966 and coach in 1968. On retirement, he co-founded the Music for Our Young Foundation. He has been active in music-related works after his retirement. He has also been a non-executive director in many companies. In 1977, he was commissioned by Governor Murray MacLehose to establish the Music Office.

== Personal life ==
He married Sarah Liao, who was also a senior civil servant and became secretary for the environment, transport and works from 2002 to 2007. They later divorced.

Government offices
Preceded by Anson Chan	Secretary for Economic Services; 1993–1996	Succeeded by Stephen Ip
Preceded by Haider Barma	Secretary for Transport; 1996–1997	Succeeded by Nicholas Ng
Preceded by Bowen Joseph Leung	Secretary for Planning, Environment and Lands; 1999	Succeeded by Himself as Secretary for Planning and Lands
Preceded by Himself as Secretary for Planning, Environment and Lands	Secretary for Planning and Lands; 1999–2001	Succeeded by John Tsang
