= Secretary for Housing =

Hong Kong Special Administrative Region Secretary for Housing 房屋局局長
- Emblem of Hong Kong

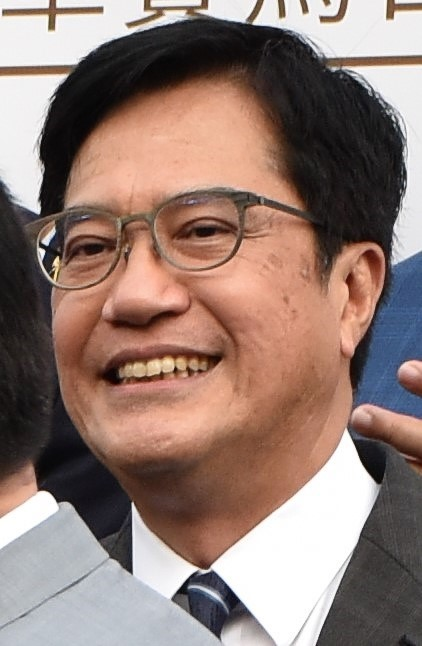
- Incumbent; Michael Wong Wai-lun since 29 October 2026
- Housing Bureau
- Style: The Honourable
- Appointer: Central People's Government nomination by Chief Executive
- Inaugural holder: Ian Macdonald Lightbody
- Formation: 1973; 53 years ago
- Website: HB

Secretary for Housing
- Traditional Chinese: 房屋局局長
- Simplified Chinese: 房屋局局长
Transcriptions
Standard Mandarin
- Hanyu Pinyin: Fángwū Jú Júzhǎng
Yue: Cantonese
- Yale Romanization: Fòhng ūk guhk guhk jéung
- Jyutping: Fong^{4} uk^{1} guk^{6} guk^{6} zoeng^{2}

The Secretary for Housing (Chinese: 房屋局局長) in Hong Kong is responsible for housing related issues. The position was first created in 1973 and re-created in 2022 after renamed to Secretary for Transport and Housing in 2007.

== List of office holders ==
Political party: Nonpartisan

=== Secretaries for Housing, 1973–1988 ===
No.	Portrait	Name	Term of office		Governor	Ref
1		Ian MacDonald Lightbody 黎保德	1973	1977	Sir Murray MacLehose (1971–1982)	
2		Alan James Scott 施恪	1 June 1977	14 May 1980	Sir Murray MacLehose (1971–1982)	
3		Donald Liao 廖本懷	15 May 1980	20 February 1985	Sir Murray MacLehose (1971–1982)	
3		Donald Liao 廖本懷	15 May 1980	20 February 1985	Sir Edward Youde (1982–1986)	
4		David Robert Ford 霍德	21 February 1985	August 1985	Sir Edward Youde (1982–1986)	
5		John Rawling Todd 杜迪	April 1986	31 March 1988	Sir Edward Youde (1982–1986)	
5		John Rawling Todd 杜迪	April 1986	31 March 1988	Sir David Wilson (1987–1992)	

Housing issues were handled by Secretary for District Administration between 1988 and 1994.

=== Secretaries for Housing, 1994–1997 ===
No.	Portrait	Name	Term of office		Governor	Ref
6		Dominic Wong 黃星華	15 December 1994	30 June 1997	Chris Patten (1992–1997)	

=== Secretaries for Housing, 1997–2002 ===
No.	Portrait	Name	Term of office		Duration	Chief Executive	Term	Ref
1		Dominic Wong Shing-wah 黃星華	1 July 1997	12 April 2002	1 year, 285 days	Tung Chee-hwa (1997–2005)	1	

=== Secretaries for Housing, Planning and Lands, 2002–2007 ===
No.	Portrait	Name	Term of office		Duration	Chief Executive	Term	Ref
1		Michael Suen Ming-yeung 孫明揚	1 July 2002	30 June 2007	5 years, 0 days	Tung Chee-hwa (1997–2005)	2	
1		Michael Suen Ming-yeung 孫明揚	1 July 2002	30 June 2007	5 years, 0 days	Donald Tsang (2005–2012)	2	

Housing issues were handled by the Secretary for Transport and Housing between 2007 and 2022.

=== Secretaries for Housing, 2022– ===
No.	Portrait	Name	Term of office		Duration	Chief Executive	Term	Ref
1		Winnie Ho Wing-yin 何永賢	1 July 2022	29 October 2026	4 years, 120 days	John Lee (2022–present)	6	
Acting		Michael Wong Wai-lun 黃偉綸	29 October 2026	Incumbent	0 days	John Lee (2022–present)	6	
