= Hong Kong Outstanding Teens Election =

The Hong Kong Outstanding Teens Election (Chinese: 香港傑出少年選舉) is a biannual election in Hong Kong. It aims at recognizing exceptional personal achievement or overcoming of challenges, encouraging contribution to society, and impacting other young people with winners' personal stories.

The election is co-organized by the Hong Kong Playground Association and Radio Television Hong Kong Channel 2 and supported by the Hong Kong Ten Outstanding Young Persons' Association and the Hong Kong Outstanding Teens Association. Every other year ten teenagers are selected to be Hong Kong Outstanding Teens while another twenty receive merit awards. The award itself is presented by the First Lady of Hong Kong: formerly, Selina Tsang (wife of Donald Tsang, the second Chief Executive) and Betty Tung (wife of Tung Chee-hwa, the first Chief Executive). Winners in each election publish together a book to share their experiences and aspirations.

== Eligibility and criteria of selection ==
Teenagers living in Hong Kong between the ages of 11 and 17 including disabled persons are eligible to apply.

Apart from those who possess exceptional academic and extracurricular achievement and good character, candidates who actively participate in community service or demonstrate outstanding resilience facing physical, personal, family or other challenges are also recognized.

== Classes of selection ==
The selection is divided into three classes, of which applicants may choose when applying. They are respectively 1. Class of Personal Achievement 2. Class of Exceptional Personal Endeavor and 3. Class of Outstanding Social Contribution.

== Elections ==
Year	Guest of Honour	Star of Election	Awardees	Name of Book
2023	Janet Lee Lam Lai-sim	Mischa Ip Hau Lam	李晉康、李智洛、李嘉汶、張首男、黃倩鑫、黃哲宇、黃樂晴、黃濬晢、潘浠淳、鄭安生	Beyond Outstanding My Path My Pace 30位香港傑出少年隨筆
2021	Carrie Lam Cheng Yuet-ngor	On Chan, Stephanie Au Hoi-shun	王印威、王朗軒、吳美慧、郭感恩、陳慧橋、許鐘玲、葉文津、楊鎧彤、鄧敬業、蕭諾瑤	Take Me To A Higher Place 2021香港傑出少年隨筆
2018	Matthew Cheung Kin-chung	Rachel Lui Sum Yu	趙浩喬、袁朗晴、伍亮恆、譚詩晴、周祉延、潘芷蕎、林嵐泓、鄭晴詠、黃雪盈、楊臻匋	夢想飛翔─香港傑出少年選舉
2016	Lady Regina Leung TONG Ching-yee	Phil Lam	張家瑋、朱柏熹、沈思彤、黃澤林、石卓琳、朱祐民、羅善晴、張曉晴、陳逸晴、李嘉琪	閃亮人生-香港傑出少年隨筆
2014	Lady Regina Leung TONG Ching-yee	Wong Cho Lam	關昊罡、練子諾、曾向鑒、陳重軒、庾天蔚、周曉樂、潘聞韶、任嘉慧、鄭紀文、容恬雅	成長的階梯 - 香港傑出少年隨筆
2012	Lady Regina Leung TONG Ching-yee	Joyce Cheng	田智婷、朱天諾、李仲賢、陳沛希、曾如恩、黃信傑、黃彩鳳、黃嘉蕊、蔡鴻成、譚峻恩	譜寫美妙的音符- 香港傑出少年隨筆
2010	Lady Selina Tsang Pau Siu-mei	Gem Tang	梁淑媛、吳靖儀、黃楚恩、何昊仁、劉穎雯、陳楚傑、陳榕狄、丘鈞銘、吳凱欣、黃君恒	卓越解碼－－香港傑出少年的故事
2008	The Hon Rita Fan Hsu Lai-tai	Hins Cheung	劉浚銘、曾子恩、沈靖韜、周亮瑩、歐鎧淳、陳楚欣、梁嘉穎、劉凡可、劉凱晴、譚建忠	傑出背後–30位傑出少年的故事
2006	Lady Selina Tsang Pau Siu-mei	Denise Ho	謝貫姿、梁德曦、葉恩欣、楊容容、金晉翰、金晉民、楊健忠、鄔昊廷、舒頌恩、梁煒鈞	心靈共賞-30個傑出少年的故事
2004	Mrs Betty Tung Chiu Hung-ping	Kelly Chan	呂增壽、李宛珊、張雅頌、戚其熙、彭禧雯、馮子榮、楊崢、劉嘉儀、鄭澍堃、羅浩晃	活出生命的精彩
2002	Mrs Betty Tung Chiu Hung-ping	Twins	卜修禮、何思朗、余珮鳴、宋狄樟、林丹虹、金晉亭、張臻善、陳偉信、賀錦珊、謝炳堅	笑迎每天的挑選-傑出少年的故事
2000	Mrs Betty Tung Chiu Hung-ping	Andy Lau	周廷勵、周美君、胡香君、陳芷澄、陳 斌、馮彥彰、黃翠盈、蔡雅君、鍾玉欣、龔淳芳	自強不息–30個傑出少年的故事
1998	Mrs Betty Tung Chiu Hung-ping	Jackie Chan	宋沛樟、戚淑媚、符倩寶、莊小平、陳天欣、黃令時、廖天蕙、黎家攸、戴希恩、羅穎兒	32個傑出的少年
1995	Mr Junsheng Zhang		王思衡、王偉基、伍綺媚、張文蕊、陳敢耀、麥紹霆、黃慧玲、葉慧詩、鄭凌、鄭煒琪、鍾彩雲	
