= List of domestic trips made by Xi Jinping (2017–2022) =

This is a list of trips made by Xi Jinping from 2017 to 2012, when he was elected as general secretary of the Chinese Communist Party for a second term.

== Summary ==
This list excludes trips made within Beijing, the capital of China in which the Zhongnanhai, the principal workplace of Xi, is located. Here are the number of visits per state or territory he traveled to:

- One: Anhui, Chongqing, Fujian, Gansu, Guangxi, Guizhou, Heilongjiang, Hong Kong, Hunan, Inner Mongolia, Jiangxi, Macau, Ningxia, Qinghai, Shandong, Tianjin, Tibet, Xinjiang, Yunnan, Zhejiang,
- Two: Guangdong, Hainan, Henan, Jiangsu, Jilin, Liaoning, Shaanxi, Shanxi, Sichuan
- Three: Hebei, Hubei, Shanghai

International

- See List of international trips made by Xi Jinping

A map of China highlighting places visited by Xi Jinping during his second term. One visit Two visits Three visits Beijing

== 2017 ==
Region	Areas visited	Dates	Details
Shanghai		31 October	Visited the former site of the 1st National Congress of the Chinese Communist Party.
Jiangsu	Xuzhou	12–13 December	Inspection trip.

== 2018 ==
Region	Areas visited	Dates	Details
Sichuan	Liangshan, Aba, Chengdu	10–13 February	Visited on the eve of the Chinese New Year.
Hainan	Qionghai, Sanya, Haikou	11–13 April	Inspection trip.
Hubei	Yichang, Jingzhou, Wuhan	24–28 April	Inspection trip.
Shandong	Qingdao, Weihai, Yantai, Jinan	12–14 June	Inspection trip.
Heilongjiang	Jiansanjiang	25–26 September	Inspection trip.
Jilin	Qiqihar, Songyuan	26–27 September	Inspection trip.
Liaoning	Liaoyang, Fushun	27–28 September	Inspection trip.
Guangdong	Zhuhai, Qingyuan, Shenzhen, Guangzhou	22–25 October	Inspection trip.
Shanghai		6–7 November	Inspection trip.

== 2019 ==
Region	Areas visited	Dates	Details
Hebei	Xiong'an	16–17 February	Inspection trip.
Tianjin		17–18 February	Inspection trip.
Chongqing		15–16 April	Inspection trip.
Jiangxi		May	Inspection trip.
Inner Mongolia	Chifeng	15–16 July	Inspection trip.
Gansu	Jiuquan, Jiayuguan, Zhangye, Wuwei, Lanzhou	19–22 August	Inspection trip.
Henan	Xinyang, Zhengzhou	16–18 September	Inspection trip.
Shanghai		2–3 December	Inspection trip.
Macau		18–20 December	See 2019 visit by Xi Jinping to Macau

== 2020 ==
Region	Areas visited	Dates	Details
Yunnan	Tengchong, Kunming	19–21 January	Visited on the eve of the Chinese New Year.
Hubei	Wuhan	10 March	Inspected COVID-19 response.
Zhejiang	Ningbo, Huzhou, Hangzhou	29 March – 1 April	Inspection trip.
Shaanxi	Shangluo, Ankang, Xi'an	20–23 April	Inspection trip.
Shanxi	Datong, Taiyuan	11–12 May	Inspection trip.
Ningxia	Wuzhong, Yinchuan	8–10 June	Inspection trip.
Jilin	Siping, Changchun	22–24 July	Inspection trip.
Anhui	Fuyang, Ma'anshan, Hefei	18–21 August	Inspection trip.
Hunan	Chenzhou, Changsha	16–18 September	Inspection trip.
Guangdong	Chaozhou, Shantou	12–13 October	Inspection trip.
Jiangsu	Nantong, Yangzhou	12–13 November	Inspection trip.

== 2021 ==
Region	Areas visited	Dates	Details
Hebei	Haidian, Yanqing, Zhangjiakou	January	Inspection trip.
Guizhou	Bijie, Guiyang	3–5 February	Visited on the eve of the Chinese New Year.
Fujian	Nanping, Sanming, Fuzhou	22–25 March	Inspection trip.
Guangxi	Guilin, Liuzhou, Nanning	25–27 April	Inspection trip.
Henan	Nanyang	12 May	Inspection trip.
Qinghai	Xining, Haibei	7–9 June	Inspection trip.
Tibet	Lhasa	21–23 July	Inspection trip.
Hebei	Chengde	23–24 August	Inspection trip.
Shaanxi	Yulin	13–14 September	Inspection trip.

== 2022 ==
Region	Areas visited	Dates	Details
Shanxi	Linfen	26–27 January	Inspection trip.
Hainan	Sanya, Wuzhishan, Danzhou	10–14 April	Inspection trip.
Sichuan	Meishan, Yibin	8 June	Inspection trip.
Hubei	Wuhan	29 June	Inspection trip.
Hong Kong		1 July	See: 2022 visit by Xi Jinping to Hong Kong
Xinjiang	Ürümqi, Shihezi, Turpan	12–15 July	Inspection trip.
Liaoning	Jinzhou, Shenyang	16–17 August	Inspection trip.
