= Crews (disambiguation) =

Crews are bodies or classes of people who work at a common activity.

Crews may also refer to:

- Crews (surname)
- Louis Crews Stadium in Huntsville, Alabama, USA
- Alton C. Crews Middle School in Gwinnett County, Georgia, USA

== See also ==
- Crew (disambiguation)
