= List of spouses of chief executives of Hong Kong =

Spouse of Chief Executive of Hong Kong
- 香港特別行政區行政長官配偶
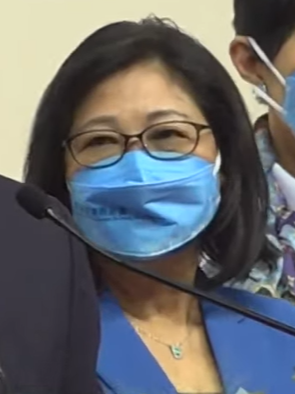
- Incumbent; Janet Lam since 1 July 2022
- Residence: Government House
- Formation: 1 July 1997
- First holder: Betty Tung

The spouse of the Chief Executive of Hong Kong is the wife or husband of the Chief Executive of Hong Kong.

During British colonial rule, there were 27 spouses of the Governor of Hong Kong, 3 of which died in office. Matthew Nathan is the only Governor of Hong Kong that is not engaged. Since Hong Kong was handed back to China in 1997, there have been four women and one man that have occupied this role.

Informally called "First Lady", there is no official formal title for the spouse of Hong Kong's leader. They are however traditionally appointed by prominent non-governmental organisations in the city as their patrons or presidents, such as Red Cross, Community Chest, Scout Association, and Girl Guides Association.

When Carrie Lam became the first female to lead the city, there were calls to refer her husband Lam Siu-por to the "first gentleman", although Lam himself does not like the term and the Chief Executive said her husband should be called "the spouse of the chief executive". Lam also broke with tradition of taking up honorary roles in community groups.

== List ==
No.	Image	Spouse	Date of birth	Date of marriage	Leader	Age at and date of tenure began	Age at and date of tenure ended	Age and date of death
1		Susanna Pottinger (née Cooke)	25 Jan 1801	1820	Henry Pottinger	42 years 26 Jun 1843	43 years 8 May 1844	85 years 2 Jul 1886
2		Emily Davis (née Humfrays)	1801/02	9 Apr 1822	John Francis Davis	41–42 years 8 May 1844	45–46 years 21 Mar 1848	63–64 years 7 Sep 1866
3		Ellen Bonham (née Barnard)	Unknown	1846	George Bonham	Unknown; 21 Mar 1848	Unknown; 13 Apr 1854	Unknown; 1859
4		Maria Bowring (née Lewin)	1793/94	1818	John Bowring	59–60 years 13 Apr 1854	63–64 years 1858	63–64 years 1858
—N/a	—N/a	—N/a	—N/a	—N/a	John Bowring	—N/a	—N/a	—N/a
5		Nea Robinson (née Annesley)	1823	1846	Hercules Robinson	42–43 years 11 Mar 1866	48–49 years 16 Apr 1872	80–81 years 1904
6		Blanche MacDonnell (née Skurray)	Unknown	1847	Richard Graves MacDonnell	Unknown; 11 Mar 1866	Unknown; 16 Apr 1872	Unknown
7		Georgina Kennedy (née MacCartney)	Unknown	1839	Arthur Kennedy	Unknown; 16 Apr 1872	Unknown; 1874	Unknown; 1874
—N/a	—N/a	—N/a	—N/a	—N/a	Arthur Kennedy	—N/a	—N/a	—N/a
8		Catherine Hennessy (née Low)	1850	1868	John Pope Hennessy	32–33 years 23 Apr 1877	36–37 years 30 Mar 1883	72–73 years? 1923
9		Diamantina Bowen (née di Roma)	1832/1833	28 Apr 1856	George Bowen	49–50 years 30 Mar 1883	53–54 years 6 Oct 1887	59–60 years 1893
10		Marion Des Vœux (née Pender)	Unknown	24 Jul 1875	William Des Vœux	Unknown; 6 Oct 1887	Unknown; 10 Dec 1891	Unknown
11		Felicia Robinson (née Rattray)	Unknown	21 Jul 1884	William Robinson	Unknown; 10 Dec 1891	Unknown; 1894	Unknown; 1894
—N/a	—N/a	—N/a	—N/a	—N/a	William Robinson	—N/a	—N/a	—N/a
12		Edith Blake (née Osborne)	7 Feb 1846	1874	Henry Arthur Blake	52 years 25 Nov 1898	57 years 21 Nov 1903	80 years 18 Apr 1926
—N/a	—N/a	—N/a	—N/a	—N/a	Matthew Nathan	—N/a	—N/a	—N/a
13		Flora Lugard (née Shaw)	19 Dec 1852	10 Jun 1902	Frederick Lugard	54 years 29 Jul 1907	59 years 16 Mar 1912	76 years 25 Jan 1929
14		Helena May (née Barker)	Unknown	1891	Francis Henry May	Unknown; 4 Jul 1912	Unknown; 12 Sep 1918	Unknown
15		Marjory Stubbs (née Womack)	1889	1909	Edward Stubbs	29–30 years 30 Sep 1919	35–36 years 31 Oct 1925	73–74 years 1963
16		Marie Clementi (née Eyres)	Unknown	1912	Cecil Clementi	Unknown; 1 Nov 1925	Unknown; 1 Feb 1930	Unknown
17		Violet Peel (née Drake)	Unknown	1911	William Peel	Unknown; 9 May 1930	Unknown; 17 May 1935	Unknown
18		Olive Caldecott (née Innes)	Unknown	1918	Andrew Caldecott	Unknown; 12 Dec 1935	Unknown; 16 Apr 1937	Unknown; 1943
19		Edith Northcote (née Adams)	Unknown	27 Oct 1910	Geoffry Northcote	Unknown; 28 Oct 1937	Unknown; 6 Sep 1941	Unknown
20		Josephine Young (née Mary)	Unknown	Unknown	Mark Aitchison Young	Unknown; 1 May 1946	Unknown; 17 May 1947	Unknown; 10 Apr 1977
21		Maurine Grantham (née Samson) 葛慕蓮	Unknown	28 Oct 1925	Alexander Grantham	Unknown; 25 Jul 1947	Unknown; 31 Dec 1957	Unknown; 1970
22		Anne Black (née Stevenson) 柏顏露絲	Unknown	1937	Robert Black	Unknown; 23 Jan 1958	Unknown; 31 Mar 1964	Unknown; 1986
23		Margaret Trench (née Gould)	Unknown	18 Aug 1944	David Trench	Unknown; 14 Apr 1964	Unknown; 19 Oct 1971	Unknown
24		Margaret MacLehose (née Dunlop) 麥鄧麗娉	26 Dec 1920	1947	Murray MacLehose	50 years 19 Nov 1971	61 years 8 May 1982	99 years 16 Feb 2020
25		Pamela Youde (née Fitt) 尤彭雯麗	6 Dec 1926	1951	Edward Youde	55 years 20 May 1982	59 years 5 Dec 1986	99 years Living
26		Natasha Wilson (née Alexander) 衛黎丹霞	28 Sep 1943	1967	David Wilson	43 years 9 Apr 1987	48 years 3 Jul 1992	83 years Living
27		Lavender Patten (née Thornton) 彭林穎彤	19 Sep 1944	1971	Chris Patten	47 years 9 Jul 1992	52 years 30 Jun 1997	82 years Living
Handover of Hong Kong
1		Betty Tung (née Chiu) 董趙洪娉	4 May 1935	1961	Tung Chee-hwa	62 years 1 Jul 1997	69 years 12 Mar 2005	91 years Living
2		Selina Tsang (née Pau) 曾鮑笑薇	1946	1969	Donald Tsang	58–59 years 21 Jun 2005	65–66 years 30 Jun 2012	79–80 years Living
3		Regina Leung (née Tong) 梁唐青儀	5 Feb 1957	1981	Leung Chun-ying	55 years 1 Jul 2012	60 years 30 Jun 2017	69 years Living
4		Lam Siu-por 林兆波	28 Mar 1954	1984	Carrie Lam	63 years 1 Jul 2017	68 years 30 Jun 2022	72 years Living
5		Janet Lee (née Lam) 李林麗嬋	Unknown	1980	John Lee	Unknown; 1 Jul 2022	Incumbent	Living

== See also ==
- Chief Executive of Hong Kong
