= Jean Lee =

Jean Lee may refer to:

- Jean Lee (aircraftwoman) (1924–2024), Canadian aircraftwoman
- Jean Lee (murderer) (1919–1951), Australian murderer, and the last woman to be hanged in Australia
- Jean Lee (archer) (1925–2010), American archer
- Jean H. Lee, Korean-American journalist

== See also ==
- Jeanne Lee (1939–2000), U.S. jazz singer
- Jeanne Lee Crews (born 1940), U.S. aerospace engineer
- Jeannie Cho Lee (born 1968), Korean-American Hongkonger journalist
- Jeannie T. Lee, U.S. geneticist
- Jeannette Lee (disambiguation)
