= Janet Lee (disambiguation) =

Janet Lee (born 1976) is a Taiwanese-American tennis player.

Janet Lee may also refer to:

- Janet Lee Bouvier (1907–1989), American socialite, mother of Jackie Kennedy Onassis
- Janet (Chisholm) Lee (1862–1940), Canadian co-founder of the Women's Institutes
- Janet K. Lee, comic book writer, co-creator of Return of the Dapper Men with Jim McCann
- Janet Lee (psychic) (born 1974), American self-proclaimed psychic
- Janet Lam (Janet Lee Lam Lai Sim) (born 1964), spouse of the chief executive of Hong Kong
- Jennie Lee, Baroness Lee of Asheridge (1904–1988), or Janet Lee, British politician and minister

== See also ==
- Jeannette Lee (disambiguation)
- Janet Leigh (1927–2004), American actress
