= Betty Tung =

Hong Kong philanthropist

1st Spouse of Chief Executive of Hong Kong
- In role 1 July 1997 – 12 March 2005
- President: Tung Chee-hwa
- Preceded by: office created
- Succeeded by: Selina Tsang

Vice Patron of Hong Kong Red Cross
- Incumbent
- In role 2019
- President: Carrie Lam and John Lee

Personal details
- Born: Betty Chiu Hung-ping; 4 May 1935 (age 91) Sai Ying Pun, British Hong Kong
- Spouse: Tung Chee-hwa (m. 1961; died 2026)
- Children: Alan Tung Lieh-sing; Andrew Tung Lieh-cheung; Audrey Slighton Tung Lieh-yuan
- Parent: Chiu Cheuk-Yue (father)
- Occupation: Former Spouse of Chief Executive of Hong Kong

Betty Tung (born Betty Chiu Hung-ping; born 4 May 1935; Chinese: 董趙洪娉) is a Hong Kong philanthropist and the former president of the Hong Kong Red Cross.

== Early life ==
Tung was born at Tsan Yuk Hospital in Sai Ying Pun, Hong Kong with ancestral roots in Xinhui, Jiangmen, Guangdong. She is the daughter of Chiu Cheuk-Yue, an architect, who had three wives. Her mother is second wife of her family. Tung finished her secondary school at St. Paul's Co-educational College and went to the United Kingdom to study nursing.

Tung held a number of philanthropic roles in Hong Kong, including founding member and honorary adviser of the Concerted Efforts Resources Centre, an organisation providing support for young people and migrants from mainland China. She was also an honorary sponsor of the All-Hong Kong Federation of Women. In 1998, she was appointed president of the Hong Kong Red Cross.

== Personal life ==
In 1961, Tung married politician Tung Chee-hwa, who later became the first Chief Executive of Hong Kong from 1997 to 2005, together they have three children. She was friends with Catherine Yung, Juliana Yam, and Irene Lee Yun-lien from Mid-Levels.
