= Crews (surname) =

Crews is an English surname.

== People ==
- Albert H. Crews, a retired colonel in the United States Air Force and a former USAF astronaut
- Andrew Crews, a professional Australian football (soccer) goalkeeper
- Art Crews, a retired American wrestler
- Bill Crews (politician), a former mayor of Melbourne, Iowa, United States
- Bill Crews (Australian clergyman), a minister in the Australian Uniting Church
- C.C. Crews, an American Civil War colonel
- Charlie Crews, a fictional detective whose story is depicted in the American television drama Life
- David Crews, an American educator
- David William Crews, an American lawyer and politician
- Donald Crews, an American writer and illustrator of several well-known children's picture books
- Dylan Crews, an American baseball player
- Frederick C. Crews (1933–2024), an essayist, author and Professor of English Emeritus at the University of California, Berkeley, United States
- Harry Crews, an American novelist, short story writer and essayist
- Jeanne Lee Crews, an American engineer at NASA
- Jim Crews, the men's basketball coach at the United States Military Academy
- John R. Crews, a soldier in the United States Army who received the Medal of Honor for his actions in World War II
- Joseph Crews, American politician
- Kambri Crews, an American comedic storyteller and writer, great-niece of John R. Crews
- Laura Hope Crews, a character actress
- Lucile Crews (1888–1972), American composer
- Terry Crews, an actor and former American football player who played in the National Football League
- Tim Crews (1961–1993), an American Major League Baseball pitcher
- Tonya Crews, an American model
- William Edward Crews, an American politician
