= 2022 visit by Xi Jinping to Hong Kong =

CCP General Secretary Xi Jinping's visit in 2022

Visit of Xi Jinping to Hong Kong
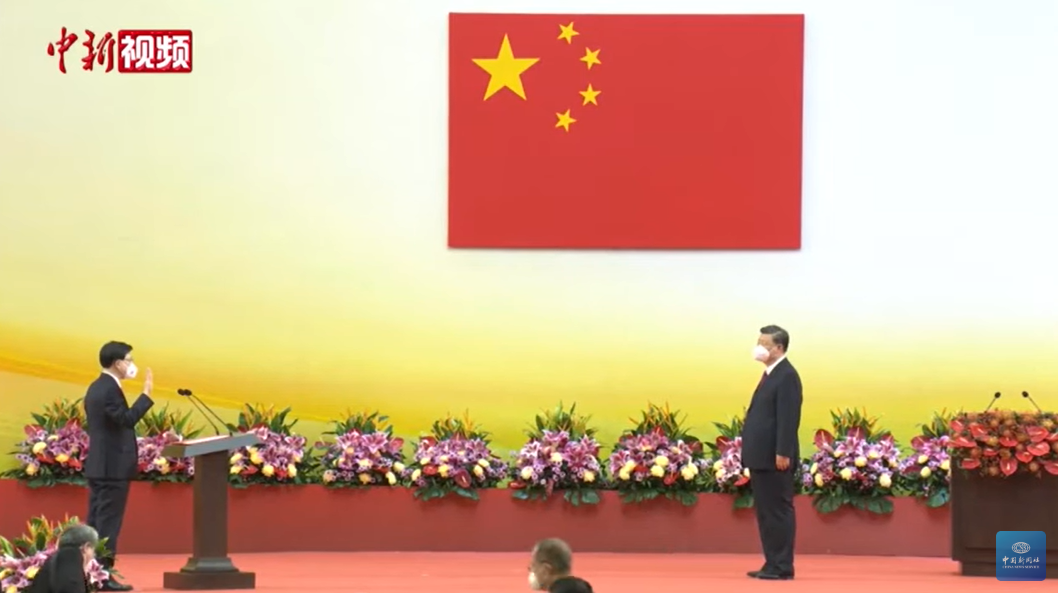
- Date: 1 July 2022
- Venue: Hong Kong
- Organised by: Government of Hong Kong; Government of China

On 1 July 2022, Chinese Communist Party (CCP) general secretary and Chinese president Xi Jinping visited Hong Kong during the 25th anniversary of its handover to the People's Republic of China. The visit was Xi's second visit to Hong Kong during his leadership, the first visit after the passage of the national security law that dramatically increased government crackdown on dissent and Xi's first trip outside mainland China since the start of the COVID-19 pandemic.

== The delegation ==
The list of party and state leaders that visited Hong Kong includes:

- Xi Jinping, General Secretary of the CCP Central Committee, President of China, and Chairman of the Central Military Commission
- Ding Xuexiang, Director of the General Office of the CCP Central Committee and Director of the General Secretary's Office
- Xu Qiliang, Vice Chairman of the Central Military Commission
- Shen Yueyue, Vice Chairperson of the Standing Committee of the National People's Congress
- Wang Yi, State Councilor and Minister of Foreign Affairs
- Xia Baolong, Vice Chairman of the National Committee of the Chinese People's Political Consultative Conference and Director of the Hong Kong and Macao Affairs Office of the State Council

== Visit ==
The visit marked the 25th anniversary of Hong Kong's handover to the People's Republic of China. It was Xi's second visit to Hong Kong during his leadership, the first visit after the passage of the national security law that dramatically increased government crackdown on dissent and Xi's first trip outside mainland China since the start of the COVID-19 pandemic. Compared to previous trips, this time there was no overnight stay in Hong Kong, and only a few places were visited. The official information was not released or confirmed beforehand, and the trip was kept secret. The government information services only issued press releases afterward to explain the details.

=== Day 1 (30 June) ===
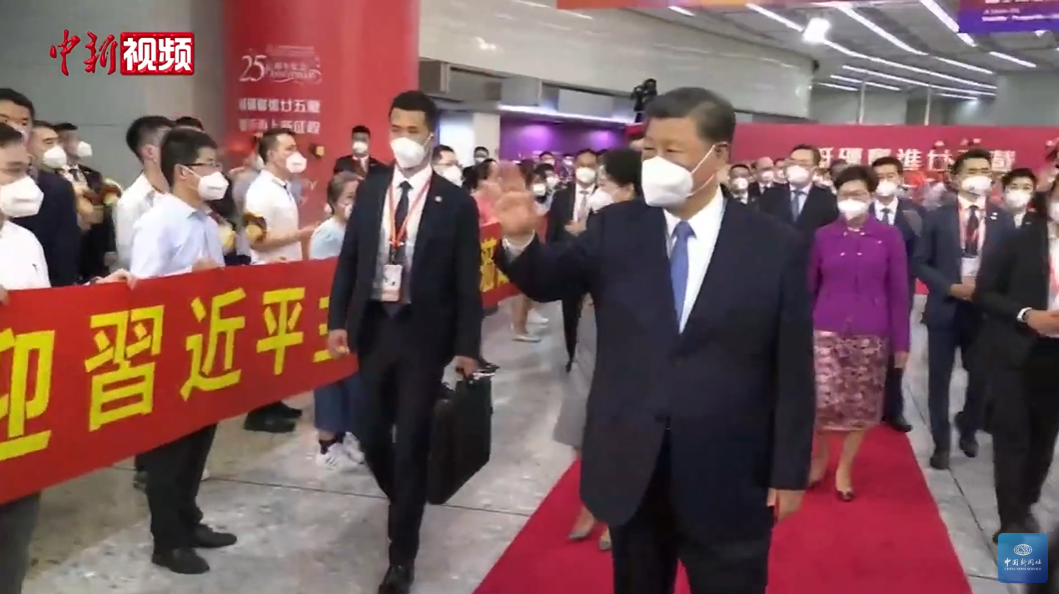
When Xi Jinping arrived at Hong Kong West Kowloon Station by special train, representatives in the lobby greeted him

At 3 p.m. on 30 June, China Central Television (CCTV) announced that Xi Jinping, General Secretary of the CCP Central Committee, President of China, and Chairman of the Central Military Commission, would arrive in Hong Kong by special train that afternoon to attend the celebration of the 25th anniversary of Hong Kong's return to China and the inauguration ceremony of the 6th Hong Kong Special Administrative Region government, which would be held on 1 July, and to inspect Hong Kong.

At 3:30 p.m., Xi Jinping and his wife Peng Liyuan arrived at Hong Kong West Kowloon Station on the CR400AF-2271 special train. Chief Executive Carrie Lam and her husband Lam Siu-por, and Luo Huining, Director of the Hong Kong Liaison Office, greeted them on the platform. Afterwards, they entered the lobby and were greeted by Chief Executive-elect John Lee Ka-chiu, Vice Chairman of the National Committee of the Chinese People's Political Consultative Conference Leung Chun-ying and other principal officials of the Hong Kong government. After arriving in Hong Kong, Xi gave a brief speech, saying that Hong Kong has "withstood one severe test after another and overcome one risk and challenge after another" and has "risen from the ashes" and is showing vigorous vitality. He also believed that the facts proved that "one country, two systems" has strong vitality and can ensure the long-term prosperity and stability of Hong Kong and safeguard the well-being of Hong Kong compatriots. He called it a good system. In addition, he also said that "my heart and the heart of the central government are with the compatriots of Hong Kong."

At 4:30 p.m., Peng Liyuan, wife of Xi Jinping, arrived at the Xiqu Centre in the West Kowloon Cultural District. During the trip, accompanied by Lu Xinning, deputy director of the Hong Kong Liaison Office, Huang Jieyi, Deputy Secretary for Home Affairs, and Tan Zhaomin, executive director of Performing Arts of the West Kowloon Cultural District Authority, Peng Liyuan interacted with young actors, orchestra members, and volunteers. She first listened to the planning and latest developments of the West Kowloon Cultural District, then watched the rehearsal of a Cantonese opera excerpt by the "Teahouse New Stars Troupe", and then watched the rehearsal of the "Hong Kong Heavenly Dunhuang Orchestra" in the rehearsal room, and had a cordial conversation with the actors and orchestra members. Finally, Peng Liyuan visited the "Yau Sing-Pu Cantonese Opera Art Exhibition: Eighty Years of Literary and Martial Arts" exhibition and presented the West Kowloon Cultural District Xiqu Centre with a collection of traditional opera works, "Ancient Opera Series". She left after staying for an hour.

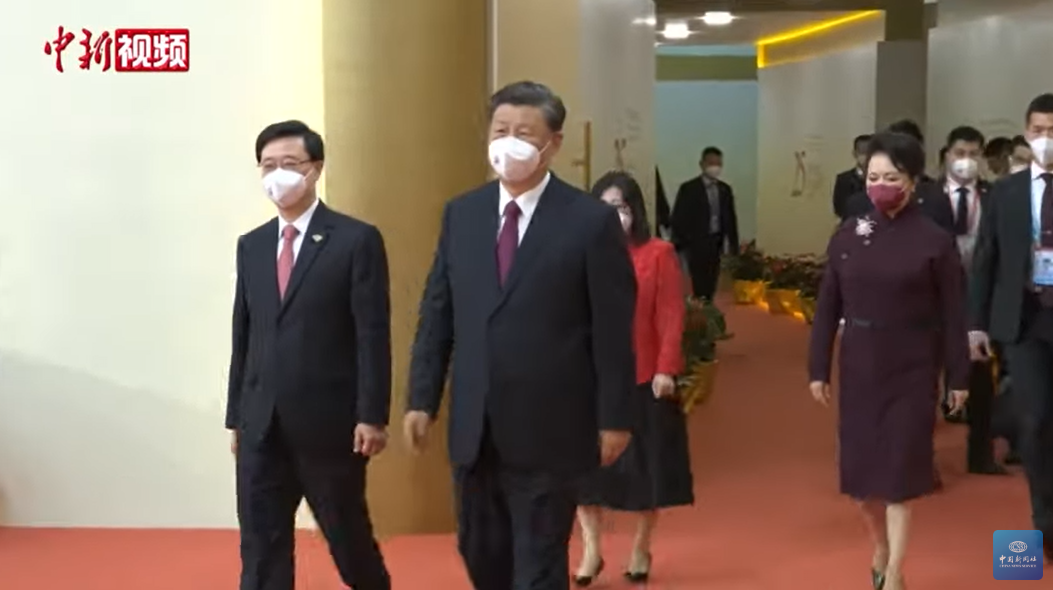
Xi Jinping and John Lee Ka-chiu, Chief Executive-designate, attended the celebration of the return to China and the inauguration ceremony of the government at the Hong Kong Convention and Exhibition Centre in Wan Chai.

At around 4 p.m., Xi first went to the Wan Chai Convention and Exhibition Centre to attend a meeting. At the meeting, accompanied by Carrie Lam, Xi Jinping met with the heads of the executive, legislative and judicial branches. Attendees included Chief Justice of the Court of Final Appeal Cheung Kui-neng, President of the Legislative Council Andrew Leung, non-official members of the Executive Council, principal officials of the fifth SAR government and all permanent secretaries of the civil service. In addition, Xi also met with more than 100 people from all walks of life in Hong Kong and representatives of the disciplined services, and took photos. At around 5:35 p.m., he arrived at the Science Park and inspected a key laboratory of the InnoHK innovation Hong Kong R&D platform. He encouraged Hong Kong researchers and representatives of innovation and technology enterprises to work harder. Xi Jinping stayed for half an hour before leaving.

At around 7:45 p.m., Xi and his wife attended a dinner hosted by Chief Executive Carrie Lam and her husband Lam Siu-por at Government House. The motorcade arrived at Government House at around 7:45 p.m. and left at around 10 p.m. It arrived at West Kowloon Station at around 10:14 p.m. and began its journey back to Shenzhen.

=== Day 2 (1 July) ===
At 10:00 a.m. on 1 July, Xi attended the celebration of the return of Hong Kong to the motherland and the inauguration ceremony of the government at the Hong Kong Convention and Exhibition Centre in Wan Chai and delivered a speech. In his speech, he first extended his sincere greetings to the people of Hong Kong, extended his warm congratulations to John Lee Ka-chiu and the principal officials, and expressed his gratitude to the compatriots who support the cause of "one country, two systems". He then put forward four musts (implementing the "one country, two systems" policy, adhering to the unity of the central government's overall governance and the protection of the special administrative region's high degree of autonomy, implementing "patriots administering Hong Kong", and maintaining Hong Kong's unique status and advantages) and four hopes (striving to improve the level of governance, continuously enhancing the momentum of development, effectively relieving people's livelihood difficulties, and jointly maintaining harmony and stability). Xi said Hong Kong had moved from "chaos" to "stability." He emphasized that "one country, two systems" has been repeatedly tested in practice and is in line with the fundamental interests of the country and the nation. He also placed high hopes on the Chief Executive-designate.

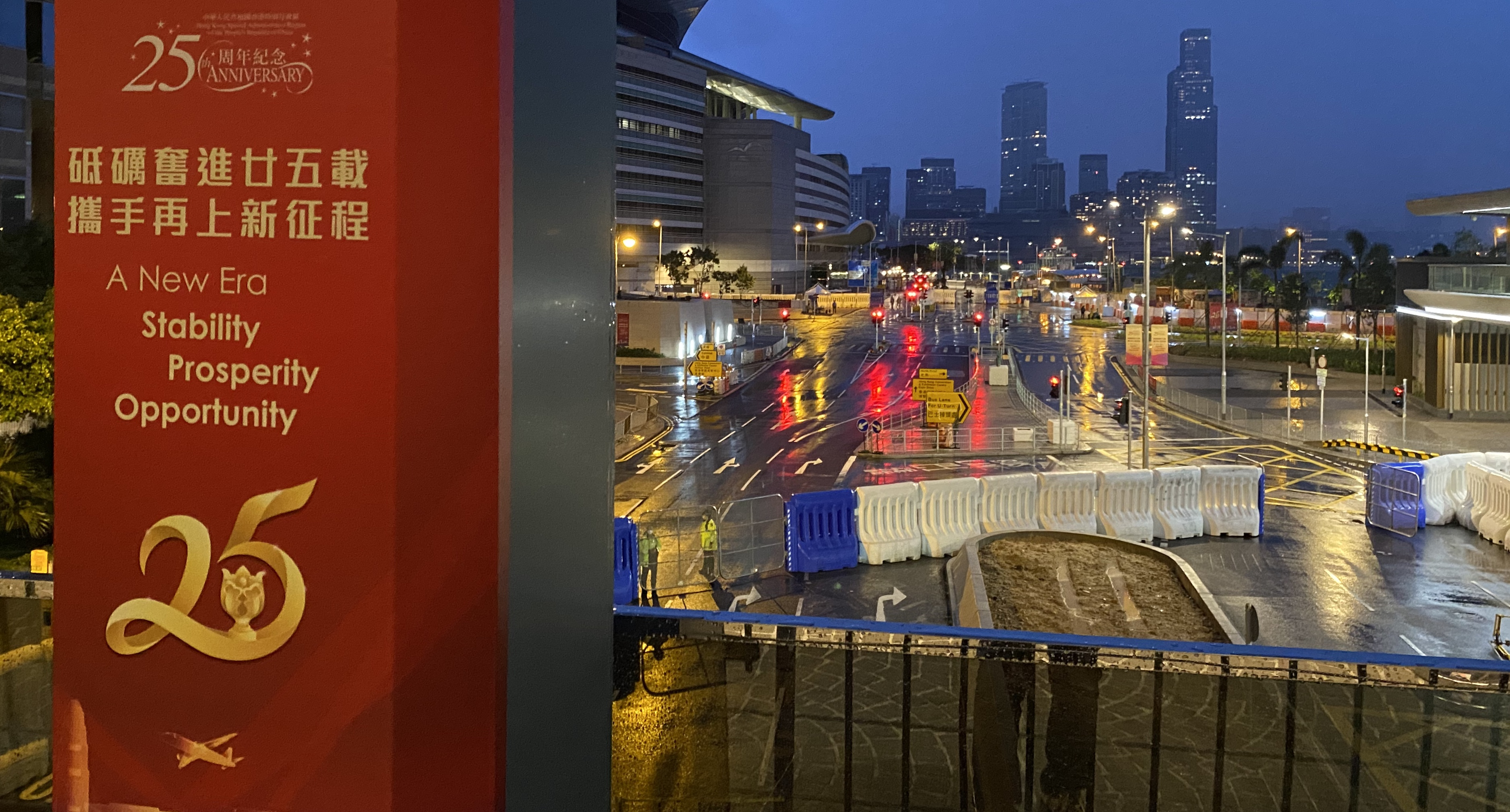
Poster marking the 25th anniversary of Hong Kong's handover to China

At around 11:30 a.m., Xi visited the Central Barracks of the Hong Kong Garrison. In his speech to all officers and soldiers, Xi emphasized that the Hong Kong Garrison resolutely implemented the decisions and deployments of the Party Central Committee and the Central Military Commission, effectively served the overall situation of the central government's work on governing Hong Kong, and played an important role in realizing the transformation of Hong Kong from chaos to order. Xi Jinping left after staying for about half an hour.

At 1 p.m., Xi, his wife Peng Liyuan, and government officials with him departed by high-speed rail, ending their visit to Hong Kong. Several student groups and representatives from various industries saw them off at the West Kowloon Station concourse, waving the national and regional flags. The Hong Kong government also arranged for primary school choirs to sing "My People, My Country" and wave banners with red backgrounds and yellow characters that read "Our great motherland will always be Hong Kong's strong backing."
