= Jeannette Lee (disambiguation) =

Jeannette Lee, Jeanette Lee, or Jennette Lee may refer to:

- Jeannette Lee, British executive at Rough Trade Records, and former bandmember of Public Image Ltd
- Jeannette H. Lee (formerly Jeannette Lee White), Korean-American businesswoman
- Jeanette Lee, Korean-American professional pool player
- Jennette Lee (1860–1951), American writer and academic

== See also ==
- Janet Lee (disambiguation)
- Jean Lee (disambiguation)
