= 2019 visit by Xi Jinping to Macau =

Visit of Xi Jinping to Macau
- Date: December 18 to 20, 2019
- Venue: Macau
- Organised by: Government of Macau; Government of China

In December 2019, Xi Jinping, the general secretary of the Chinese Communist Party, visited inspect Macau to attend the celebrations the 20th anniversary of Macau's handover to China.

On December 14, 2019, Xinhua News Agency issued a press release stating that Xi Jinping would attend the celebration of the 20th anniversary of Macau's return to China and the inauguration ceremony of the fifth government of the Macau Special Administrative Region, and inspect the Macau. Subsequently, the Information Bureau, the official media agency of the Macau government, announced the relevant news. This is Xi Jinping's third visit to Macau as a Party and state leader; it is also his second visit to Macau since he was elected CCP General Secretary in 2012; and it is also his sixth visit to Macau since he served as Governor of Fujian, Party Secretary of Zhejiang, and member of the Politburo Standing Committee.

== Preparations ==
On November 27, 2019, the Civil Aviation Administration announced that in order to ensure the smooth conduct of the celebration of the 20th anniversary of Macau's return to the motherland, it would implement a no-fly zone for drones in Macau from December 14 to 22, 2019 (a total of nine days) in accordance with the power to prohibit or restrict flights in Article 66 of the "Macau Air Navigation Regulations " approved by Administrative Order No. 64/2019, so as to ensure that the final stage of the preparation and holding of the celebration of the 20th anniversary of Macau's return to the motherland could be carried out safely.

From December 10 to 22, 2019, in order to ensure the smooth holding of the celebration activities for the 20th anniversary of Macau's return to the motherland, the Zhuhai Municipal Public Security Bureau and the Zhuhai Entry-Exit Border Inspection Station issued an announcement stating that in order to effectively maintain the traffic order in the Hong Kong-Zhuhai-Macau Bridge area, a security checkpoint was set up on the East Artificial Island of the Hong Kong-Zhuhai-Macau Bridge to conduct security checks on personnel and means of transport entering Macau and Zhuhai from Hong Kong via the Hong Kong-Zhuhai-Macau Bridge in accordance with the law.

On December 16, 2019, the Public Security Police Force and the Macau Customs announced that from 00:00 on December 17 to 00:00 on December 21 of that year, they would conduct joint inspections on passenger vehicles entering and leaving the country using the lanes of various land ports in Macau (Hong Kong-Zhuhai-Macau Bridge, Border Gate, Cotai, and Zhuhai-Macau Cross-Border Industrial Zone). During the inspection, drivers are requested to cooperate with the instructions of the law enforcement officers and security guards on site and wait patiently. In addition, it is expected that the waiting time for vehicles at various ports (especially the Border Gate) will be longer at that time.

From 13:00 on December 18, 2019, to the entire day of December 20, 2019, the Taipa Line of the Macau Light Rail Transit was suspended in conjunction with the special security work for the visit of Xi Jinping, General Secretary of the CCP Central Committee, to Macau and his attendance at the 20th anniversary of Macau's return to China.

== Members of the delegation ==
- Xi Jinping, General Secretary of the Chinese Communist Party, President of China, and Chairman of the Central Military Commission
- Ding Xuexiang, member of the Politburo of the Chinese Communist Party, director of the General Office of the Chinese Communist Party, and director of the General Secretary's Office
- Wang Chen, member of the Politburo of the Chinese Communist Party and Vice Chairman of the Standing Committee of the National People's Congress
- Zhang Youxia, member of the Politburo of the Chinese Communist Party and vice chairman of the Central Military Commission
- Wang Yi: State Councillor and Minister of Foreign Affairs
- Ma Biao: Vice Chairman of the Chinese People's Political Consultative Conference
- Zhang Xiaoming: Director of the Hong Kong and Macau Affairs Office of the State Council

== Visit ==
Xi Jinping, General Secretary of the CCP, led a delegation of central party and government officials to Macau International Airport on the afternoon of December 18, 2019. On December 19 of that year, he met with officials of the Macau Special Administrative Region and people from all walks of life in Macau. In the evening, he attended a welcome banquet hosted by the SAR government and a cultural performance entitled "Macau Love, Chinese Heart Celebrating the 20th Anniversary of Macau's Return to the Motherland". On the morning of December 20, Xi Jinping will attend the "Celebration of the 20th Anniversary of Macau's Return to the Motherland and the Inauguration Ceremony of the Fifth Government of the Macau Special Administrative Region", and then meet with the newly appointed executive, legislative and judicial officials of the Macau Special Administrative Region. He will leave Macau after completing his itinerary in the afternoon.

=== 18 December ===
At 4 p.m. on December 18, 2019, Xi Jinping led a delegation of central party and government organs to Macau International Airport by special plane. Chief Executive Chui Sai On, Chief Executive-elect Ho Iat Seng, Vice Chairman of the National Committee of the Chinese People's Political Consultative Conference Ho Hau Wah, and Director of the Liaison Office of the Central People's Government in Macau Fu Ziying and others were there to greet him. Xi Jinping made a brief speech at the airport, saying, "I visited Macau in June 2000, less than half a year after the establishment of the Macau Special Administrative Region. I have visited Macau many times since then. The most recent time was five years ago, when I came to attend the celebration activities on the 15th anniversary of Macau's return to the motherland. Now it is the 20th anniversary of the return, and I am very happy to come to Macau again." Xi Jinping pointed out that following the celebration of the 70th anniversary of the People's Republic of China in October of that year, the 20th anniversary of Macau's return to China is also another major event of concern to the people of the whole country. On behalf of the central government and the people of all ethnic groups in the country, he extended his best wishes to the compatriots in Macau.

Subsequently, Xi Jinping met with then Chief Executive Chui Sai On and said that Chui Sai On had worked diligently and conscientiously as Chief Executive of the Macau SAR for 10 years. Under his leadership, the SAR government fully and accurately implemented the " one country, two systems" policy, strictly followed the Constitution and the Basic Law, and governed steadily and pragmatically. Whether it was maintaining national security and social stability, promoting economic development and improving people's livelihoods, deepening exchanges and cooperation with the mainland and expanding foreign exchanges, many new achievements were made, consolidating and developing the good situation of Macau's prosperity and stability. The central government fully affirmed his work.

=== 19 December ===
On the morning of December 19, 2019, Xi Jinping, accompanied by Chui Sai On, Chief Executive of the Macau Special Administrative Region, visited the Complex of the China-Portuguese-speaking Countries Trade and Economic Cooperation Service Platform. Xi Jinping listened to the introduction of the complex and forum, viewed the exhibition of the platform's construction achievements and the display of products from Portuguese-speaking countries, and affirmed the progress made by Macau in promoting the construction of the China-Portuguese-speaking Countries Trade and Economic Cooperation Service Platform since its return to China. Xi Jinping said that building the China-Portuguese-speaking Countries Trade and Economic Cooperation Service Platform is an important measure for Macau to give full play to its own strengths and serve the needs of the country.

On the same morning, Xi Jinping visited the government comprehensive service building in Heishawan and inspected the local people's livelihood services in Macau. He said that the people's livelihood in Macau has improved significantly in the 20 years since Macau's return to China. From the voices of the vast majority of Macau compatriots and citizens, it can be seen that Macau is a prosperous and developing place. The then Secretary for Administration and Justice, Chan Hoi Fan, introduced the certificate service and functions to Xi Jinping. He then went to the Hou Kong Middle School Affiliated Yingcai School in Taipa. On the eve of International Children's Day on June 1, 2019, Xi Jinping wrote back to the primary school students of the school and gave them kind encouragement, which aroused a warm response in Macau society. When he visited the school library, he told the teachers and students of the school that textbooks are an important carrier of patriotic education. The practice of the SAR government and the mainland jointly compiling textbooks is worthy of full affirmation. We should encourage more schools to use the new textbooks and let the teachers teach the textbooks well, vividly and deeply. He then delivered an important speech in the school auditorium. He said that Hou Kong Middle School is a school with a long patriotic tradition. In May of that year, I received a letter from a child from Yingcai School. The strong sense of national pride and patriotism on the paper moved me deeply. The glorious history of Hou Kong Middle School also reflects the deep patriotism that the people of Macau have always upheld. Patriotism has laid a solid social and political foundation for Macau to implement "one country, two systems", ensuring that the practice of "one country, two systems" always moves in the right direction and yields fruitful results of prosperity and development.

That afternoon, Xi Jinping met with 150 people from all walks of life in Macau at the East Asian Games Dome in Macau, including then and current officials and Macau deputies to the National People's Congress. Xi Jinping said that Macau has achieved remarkable achievements in the 20 years since its return to China, and praised Macau's achievements in economic income, health and culture. He expressed his gratitude and high respect to the people present. He also said that it is necessary to maintain the good situation of Macau's development and hoped that all sectors of society would play an exemplary role in three aspects, including firmly supporting the Chief Executive and the SAR government to govern in accordance with the law, giving full play to Macau's advantages and continuing to take the lead in being active participants in the great rejuvenation of the Chinese nation. Xi Jinping said that Macau has achieved proud achievements in the 20 years since its return to China, realizing "small but rich", "small but strong", "small but healthy" and "small but beautiful", and has put on a wonderful show on a small table. These achievements are the result of the wisdom and hard work of all Macau residents. I would like to express my heartfelt thanks and high respect to you and friends from all walks of life in Macau.

Xi Jinping also met with the heads of the executive, legislative and judicial organs. Xi Jinping pointed out that over the past five years, under the leadership of Chief Executive Chui Sai On, the executive, legislative and judicial organs of Macau have strictly acted in accordance with the Constitution and the Basic Law, earnestly performed their duties, made hard work and achieved fruitful results, and delivered a satisfactory answer to the central government and the residents of Macau. The central government fully affirms and highly praises everyone's work.

When Xi Jinping met with Ho Hau Wah, vice chairman of the National Committee of the Chinese People's Political Consultative Conference (CPPCC), he said that Ho had laid a good foundation for the construction and development of the Macau Special Administrative Region as the first and second chief executive of the Macau, and had "fastened the first button well." After becoming vice chairman of the CPPCC, he continued to do his best for the cause of "one country, two systems" in Macau and the cause of national modernization, and his work was fully affirmed.

During his meeting with representatives of the disciplined forces of the Macau, Xi Jinping said that after Macau returned to China, it quickly and thoroughly reversed the situation of poor public security before the return, making Macau one of the safest cities in the world. This is a remarkable achievement. The disciplined forces of Macau have made arduous efforts and done a lot of work for this, which deserves full recognition and high praise. At the same time, he emphasized that the disciplined forces bear the important responsibility of safeguarding national security and Macau security. They must strengthen national consciousness, establish bottom-line thinking, maintain high vigilance, and resolutely prevent and combat any behavior that endangers national sovereignty and security, challenges the authority of the central government and the Basic Law, or uses Macau to infiltrate and undermine the mainland. They must adhere to strict law enforcement. No matter what organization, person, excuse, or method attacks the rule of law and disrupts order, no matter what complex situation or external pressure they face, they must resolutely, bravely, and professionally make effective decisions. Xi Jinping also met with Chief Executive of the Hong Kong Special Administrative Region Carrie Lam and some government officials in Macau and said that the central government fully affirmed the courage and responsibility shown by Chief Executive Carrie Lam in the "extraordinary period".

On the afternoon of December 19, 2019, at around 2 p.m., Xi Jinping's wife Peng Liyuan visited the Mong-Hia campus of the Macau Institute for Tourism Studies, toured the culinary teaching class of the Institute for Tourism Studies, and made Portuguese egg tarts with the students. She was accompanied by then-Chief Executive Chui Sai On's wife, Chui Ho Wai Fun, deputy director of the Liaison Office of the Central People's Government in Macau, Zhang Rongshun, and Dean of the Institute for Tourism Studies, Huang Zhujun. Dean Huang Zhujun said that Xi Jinping's wife had a lot of interaction with the students during her visit to the institute, and hoped that the students would be able to apply what they have learned in the future; she also cared about the students from the mainland and hoped that they could return to the mainland to contribute their own strength in the future; at the same time, she encouraged the Institute for Tourism Studies to continue to work hard to run the school and cultivate more tourism talents.

In the evening, the Macau government held a welcome banquet for Xi Jinping. About 600 people attended, including the then Chief Executive-designate Ho Iat Seng and the then Chief Executive of Hong Kong Carrie Lam. Xi Jinping delivered a speech at the banquet, first mentioning that 2019 was the 70th anniversary of the founding of the People's Republic of China. Over the past 70 years, under the Chinese Communist Party, and through the hard work and struggle of the people of all ethnic groups across the country, China has gone from being poor and backward to having an economy that ranks second in the world, from being unable to meet basic needs to being on the verge of building a moderately prosperous society in all respects. The country has achieved a historic leap in comprehensive national strength and maintained long-term social stability, creating a miracle in human history. Regarding his message to Macau, Xi Jinping said that the practice of "one country, two systems" with Macau characteristics will surely achieve greater success. He firmly believes that the Macau compatriots will surely make greater contributions to realizing the Chinese dream of the great rejuvenation of the Chinese nation.

At 8 p.m., Xi Jinping and his wife, Chief Executive Chui Sai On and his wife, and Chief Executive-elect Ho Iat Seng and his wife, along with more than 1,000 guests, attended the “Celebrating the 20th Anniversary of Macau’s Return to the Motherland” gala. The gala, themed “Macau’s Affection and Chinese Heart”, presented the transformation and achievements of Macau since its return to the motherland on stage. At the end of the performance, Xi Jinping, accompanied by Chief Executive Chui Sai On and Chief Executive-elect Ho Iat Seng, went on stage to meet the performers and sang Ode to the Motherland with the audience.

=== 20 December ===
At 10 a.m., Xi Jinping attended the celebration of the 20th anniversary of Macau's return to China and the inauguration ceremony of the fifth government of the Macau Special Administrative Region held at the East Asian Games Dome in Macau. He delivered an important speech, which discussed the achievements of Macau's successful implementation of “one country, two systems” in the past 20 years since its return to China. He also listed the achievements in various aspects in detail, especially praising Macau for successfully completing the legislation of Article 23 of the Basic Law, and for the executive, legislative and judicial organs to strictly perform their duties in accordance with the law and properly handle their mutual relations. The fifth Chief Executive Ho Iat Seng was sworn in under the supervision of Xi Jinping, and the principal officials of the fifth SAR government and members of the Executive Council were also sworn in under the supervision of Xi Jinping and Ho Iat Seng.

In his speech, Xi Jinping summarized four key lessons learned from the successful practice of "one country, two systems" in Macau. First, unwavering confidence in the "one country, two systems" principle has been crucial. The SAR government and all sectors of society have steadfastly upheld the principle of protecting national sovereignty, security, and development interests while maintaining Macau's long-term prosperity and stability, demonstrating the vitality and superiority of "one country, two systems." Second, accurately grasping the correct direction of "one country, two systems" and resolutely upholding the constitutional order established by the Constitution and the Basic Law are essential to ensuring that the practice of "one country, two systems" remains unchanged and undistorted, thus ensuring its steady and long-term development. Third, consistently strengthening the sense of mission and responsibility under "one country, two systems" and closely linking this responsibility with realizing the Chinese Dream of the great rejuvenation of the Chinese nation are vital for the effective management, construction, and development of the Special Administrative Region. Fourth, it is crucial to consistently solidify the socio-political foundation of "One Country, Two Systems." The people of Macau have a long-standing patriotic tradition and a strong sense of national identity, belonging, and national pride. This is the most important reason for the successful implementation of "One Country, Two Systems" in Macau and the fundamental guarantee that it will always move along the correct path. He then put forward four hopes: to keep pace with the times and further improve the governance of the Special Administrative Regions; to persist in innovation and further promote sustained and healthy economic development; to adhere to a people-centered approach and further guarantee and improve people's livelihoods; and to uphold inclusiveness and mutual assistance and further promote social harmony and stability. Xi Jinping emphasized that after Hong Kong and Macau returned to China, handling the affairs of these two Special Administrative Regions is entirely China's internal affair, and no external forces have any right to interfere. The Chinese government and the Chinese people's will to safeguard national sovereignty, security, and development interests is unwavering, and they will never allow any external forces to interfere in Hong Kong and Macau affairs. The success of the "One Country, Two Systems" practice is universally recognized, and the system of "One Country, Two Systems" must be continuously improved in practice. He firmly believes that the Chinese people, including compatriots in Hong Kong and Macau, have the wisdom and ability to develop the practice of "one country, two systems" better, improve the system of "one country, two systems" better, and govern the special administrative regions better. The great rejuvenation of the Chinese nation is an unstoppable force, and the path of Hong Kong and Macau developing and prospering together with the mainland will surely become wider and wider.

Xi Jinping then met with the newly appointed Chief Executive Ho Iat Seng, pointing out that he had high trust in him and that he was able to lead the Special Administrative Region government to fully and accurately implement the "one country, two systems" policy, strictly abide by the Constitution and the Basic Law, govern steadily and make great strides. He also pointed out that on the good foundation laid by the previous governments, the government would continue to promote the economic development of Macau, improve people's livelihood and social harmony, and actively participate in the joint construction of the "Belt and Road" and the construction of the Guangdong-Hong Kong-Macau Greater Bay Area, so as to build Macau into a better place. Ho Iat Seng thanked Xi Jinping and the Central Government for their trust. Xi Jinping also met with the newly appointed heads of the executive, legislative and judicial organs. Xi Jinping pointed out that the new Special Administrative Region government's governing team was full of vigor and vitality. At present, Macau's development is at a critical period of carrying forward the past and opening up the future. Everyone should keep their oath in mind, shoulder their responsibilities, and put forward five hopes.

That afternoon, Xi Jinping successfully concluded his various activities in Macau and returned to Beijing by special plane. The Macau Special Administrative Region Government held a farewell ceremony at Macau International Airport, and then Fu Ziying, Director of the Macau Liaison Office, met with the media. He said that Xi Jinping participated in 19 important activities and delivered a series of important speeches in 48 hours. The itinerary was tight, fruitful and of great significance. He had three points of understanding: First, Xi Jinping cares about people's livelihood and the well-being of Macau compatriots. Second, Xi Jinping cares about development and plans the blueprint for Macau's development. Third, Xi Jinping cares about the future and declares that the original intention of "one country, two systems" remains unchanged.

== Reactions ==
During Xi Jinping ’s visit to Macau, security issues once again sparked controversy. Several Hong Kong journalists were refused entry to Macau, and some journalists even had their mobile phones checked by the Public Security Police Force. Chief Executive Ho Iat Seng said that the refusal of entry was a warning that there are standards, and that just because someone has a press card does not mean that they are allowed to enter the country. He said that the police should be respected for acting in accordance with the law. When asked about the alleged intimidation or even deportation of journalists, Ho Iat Seng said that he did not know about the situation and that he could not listen to one-sided statements.

To ensure Xi Jinping’s safety during his visit to Macau, relevant departments in Beijing and the Macau security authorities have taken very strict security measures. Among them, strict monitoring of people and vehicles entering and leaving the country is carried out at various ports. The small city, which has always been a harmonious society, is also on high alert. Even basic livelihood services such as the delivery of liquefied petroleum gas and the refueling of cars have been explained in advance by the relevant business operators, because the transportation arrangements for these days are special and the services may be affected. In addition, there are warning signs on the screens on the buses: “Celebrate the return, ensure safety.” Some netizens lamented that different governments have announced a three-day holiday for the whole of Macau.

On the eve of Xi Jinping's visit to Macau, Macau was on high alert and 1,620 “ Sky Eye ” surveillance cameras were installed in areas including the border areas, main roads, tourist attractions, and 800 “secluded places with potential security risks”. In order to improve the efficiency of police investigation, 50 “background facial recognition technology” cameras were also introduced to replace the need to endure the search of surveillance cameras. Another 50 cameras were also installed for license plate recognition. As Hong Kong was in the midst of the anti -extradition movement at the time, in order to welcome Xi Jinping's visit, the relevant departments took unprecedented security measures. In addition to prohibiting some Hong Kong residents from entering Macau, many Hong Kong media reporters, including several Hong Kong media reporters who had obtained press passes issued by the Macau authorities, were intercepted and refused entry by the police when they went to Macau for interviews. Four Hong Kong activists, including Leung Kwok-hung and three other members, planned to take a boat to Macau to protest on December 18, but were refused boarding. A leader of the American Chamber of Commerce in Hong Kong was also refused entry before Xi Jinping's visit to Macau, and the authorities did not provide a reason for the ban.

The Zhuhai Public Security Bureau set up an additional checkpoint on the Hong Kong-Zhuhai-Macau Bridge. Some Hong Kong citizens were arrested at the checkpoint while traveling to Macau, which was suspected of being fugitives, triggering controversy. In addition, reporters from several Hong Kong media outlets, including RTHK, TVB News, Now News, Commercial Radio, and the South China Morning Post, were refused entry. Some reporters were approved by the Macau Government Information Bureau to cover official trips, but when crossing the border, the authorities cited the Macau Special Administrative Region's Internal Security Framework Law, stating that there were strong indications that these reporters were engaged in "activities that endanger public safety or public order" in Macau. RTHK, Commercial Radio, Now News, and the South China Morning Post expressed their regret over the incident.

During Xi Jinping's visit to Macau, the city was under tight security, and there was even a wave of “blind robbery”. When interviewed, Secretary for Security Wong Sio Chak said that all security work was carried out in accordance with the deployment and arrangements, and that the work had been done to minimize disturbance to the public and meet the requirements of the national leader. He said that he had also inspected various districts in the past few days and believed that the traffic in the city was very smooth and that the residents’ living order was ensured. He also said that “different people have different opinions, which is very normal.” Regarding the fact that some social activists were followed and harassed by suspected national security personnel, Wong Sio Chak said that if any citizen felt that their legitimate rights and interests had been violated, they could call the police at any time. He also said that he had not received any reports of national security personnel carrying out missions in Macau.
