= Lam Siu-por =

Hong Kong mathematician, spouse of Carrie Lam

- 林兆波
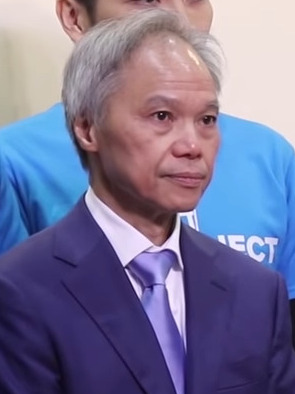
- Lam in 2017

4th Spouse of Chief Executive of Hong Kong
- In role 1 July 2017 – 30 June 2022
- Chief Executive: Carrie Lam
- Preceded by: Regina Leung
- Succeeded by: Janet Lam

Personal details
- Born: 28 March 1954 (age 72) British Hong Kong
- Citizenship: Chinese (Hong Kong) (1997–); British
- Spouse: Carrie Lam (m. 1984)
- Children: 2
- Education: Maryknoll Fathers' School
- Alma mater: University of Hong Kong (MPhil); University of Cambridge (PhD)
- Occupation: Mathematician
- Scientific career
- Fields: Mathematics
- Thesis: Unstable Algebras over the Steenrod Algebra and Cohomology of Classifying Spaces (1982)
- Doctoral advisor: Frank Adams

Chinese name
- Chinese: 林兆波
Transcriptions
Standard Mandarin
- Hanyu Pinyin: Lín Zhàobō
Yue: Cantonese
- Jyutping: Lam4 Siu6 Bo1

Lam Siu-por (Chinese: 林兆波; Jyutping: Lam4 Siu6 Bo1; born 28 March 1954) is a Hong Kong mathematician and the husband of Carrie Lam, who served as the fourth Chief Executive of Hong Kong from 2017 to 2022.

== Career ==
Lam earned his doctorate in algebraic topology from the University of Cambridge in 1983, after writing his thesis under the direction of Frank Adams.

He used to teach at the Chinese University of Hong Kong and had stayed in the UK. Lam also taught short courses at the Capital Normal University in Beijing before his wife announced her candidacy for chief executive in December 2016.

== Personal life ==
With Carrie Lam, Lam Siu-por has two sons, Jit-Si Jeremy and Yeuk-Hay Joshua‌, both of whom studied in Great Britain.

He and his two adult sons hold Hong Kong and British nationality, allowing Carrie Lam the ability to move to the UK alongside her family.

== Political views ==
In a closed-door meeting during the 2019–20 Hong Kong protests, Carrie Lam said that Lam had told her she would be "condemned by history".

During the ceremony of the 20th anniversary of the handover of Macau in 2019, Lam was spotted not clapping and not singing during a group sing-along of the patriotic song "Ode to the Motherland" led by Chinese President and General Secretary of the Communist Party Xi Jinping. This was seen by some as a silent act of support for Hong Kong's pro democracy movement. An editorial compared Lam's behavior to August Landmesser's refusal to perform the Nazi salute with fellow workers during the reign of Nazi Germany.

== Research ==
According to the mathematics review database zbMATH Open, Lam has only one publication so far, published when he was completing his PhD.

Unofficial roles
Preceded by Regina Leung	Spouse of the Chief Executive of Hong Kong; 2017–2022	Succeeded by Janet Lam
