= Regina Leung =

Former Solicitor in Hong Kong

- 梁唐青儀
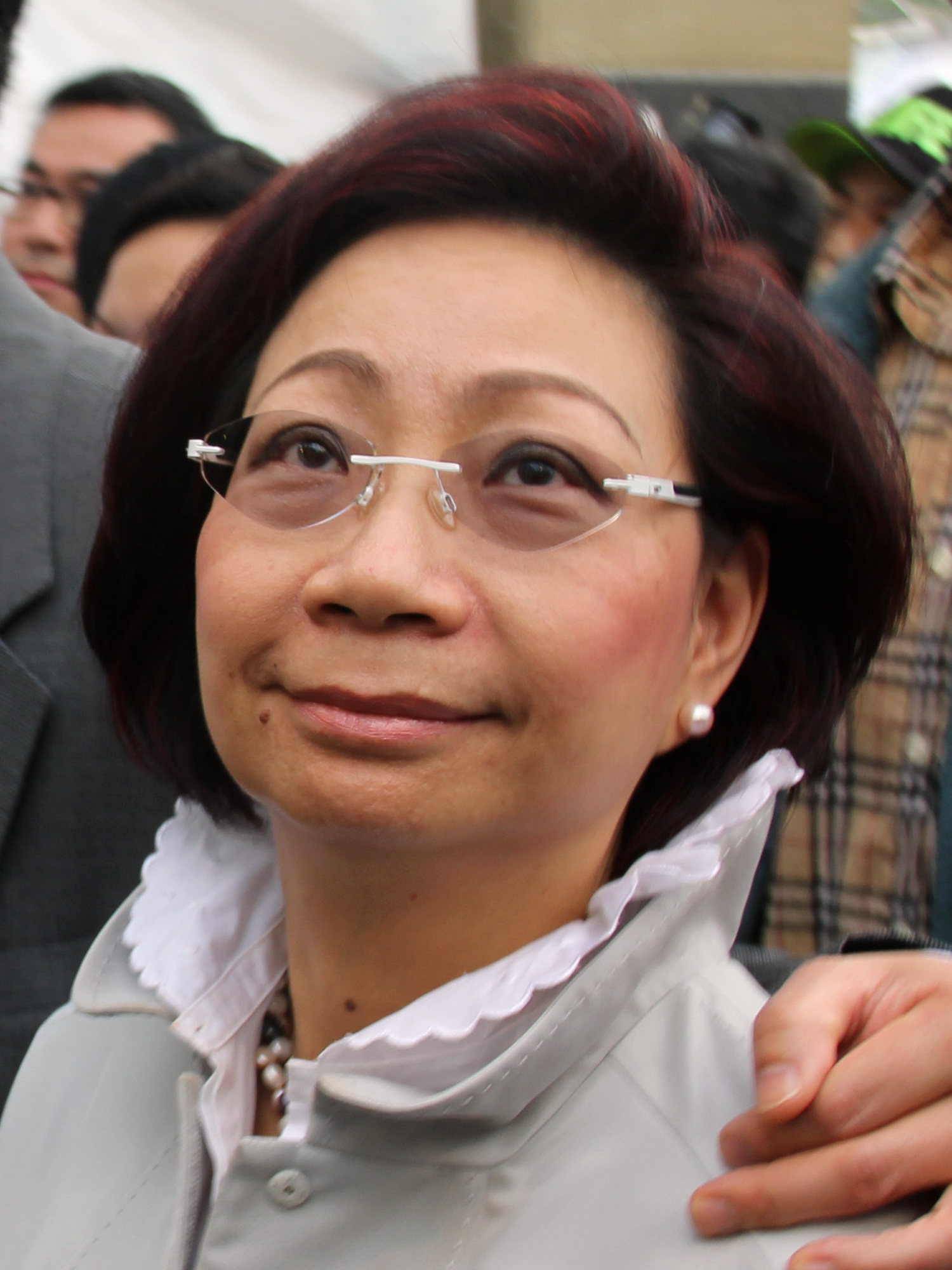
- Regina Leung at the Chinese New Year market at Victoria Park, Hong Kong in 2013

3rd Spouse of Chief Executive of Hong Kong
- In role 1 July 2012 – 30 June 2017
- Chief Executive: Leung Chun-ying
- Preceded by: Selina Tsang
- Succeeded by: Lam Siu-por

Personal details
- Born: Tong Ching-yee; 5 February 1957 (age 69) Sai Ying Pun, Hong Kong
- Spouse: Leung Chun-ying (m. 1981)
- Children: 3
- Education: Bristol Polytechnic
- Occupation: Solicitor (formerly)

Regina Leung
- Traditional Chinese: 梁唐青儀
- Simplified Chinese: 梁唐青仪
Transcriptions
Standard Mandarin
- Hanyu Pinyin: Liáng Táng Qīngyí
Yue: Cantonese
- Jyutping: loeng4 tong4 cing1 ji4

Regina Leung Tong Ching-yee (Chinese: 梁唐青儀; born 5 February 1957) is a former solicitor in Hong Kong. She is the wife of Leung Chun-ying, the former Chief Executive of Hong Kong.

== Early life and marriage ==
Regina Tong was born at Tsan Yuk Hospital, the teaching hospital of University of Hong Kong in Sai Ying Pun, Hong Kong, on 5 February 1957 to a merchant Tong Chi-ming and mother Kwok Chor-gar with ancestral roots in Beihai, Guangxi. She changed her name to Regina Ching Yee Higgins, as appeared on the certificate of marriage with Leung Chun-ying. Lawyers speculated that Tong could have been adopted by her British relative, Kwok Cheo One, also named Higgins Cheo One, during her study in Britain to avoid high tuition fees. She was also a British citizen.

She studied law at the Bristol Polytechnic in 1978 and met Leung Chun-ying, a fresh graduate, at an alumni gathering. They married on 7 August 1981 and had three children: Leung Chuen-yan, Leung Chai-yan and Leung Chung-yan. In 1983, she received the qualifications to practice law in Hong Kong until she retired in 1999. In 1992, she formed an investment company with her mother and changed her name back to Regina Tong. She resided in London during the 2000s to take care of her children who all studied in Britain at the time.

== Spouse of Chief Executive ==
Regina Leung became the Spouse of Chief Executive after her husband Leung Chun-ying won the 2012 Chief Executive election. As the spouse of the Chief Executive, Regina Leung took positions of patron and president of many non-governmental organisations, following former Chief Executive Donald Tsang Yam-kuen's wife, Selina Tsang Pou Siu-mei, and Tung Chee-hwa's wife, Betty Tung Chiu Hung-ping. Leung is the president of the Community Chest of Hong Kong and the Hong Kong Girl Guides Association. However, Hong Kong Red Cross, which had traditionally invited spouses of the Chief Executive to be president, decided not to invite Leung as the new president but invited retired judge Yang Ti-liang instead.

=== Food waste organisation controversy ===
In November 2012, Regina Leung founded the Food for Good, a non-profit organisation to redistribute leftover food from hotels, restaurants and bakeries to those in need and promote policy on reducing and recycling food waste. She was criticised after she used the Chief Executive Office to meet with the members of the Friends of Earth and Green Power for "using government resources to handle her private matters." Labour Party legislator Cyd Ho said it was not appropriate for Leung to be involved in a company which could make a profit her company was still registered as a company instead of a non-profit organisation. The Chief Executive Office later said Leung would quit her post as a director and switch to an honorary role once operations get under way.

=== Daughter's Facebook post ===
In 2014 when her 22-year-old daughter Leung Chai-yan published a Facebook post that depicted a slashed wrist captioned "Will I bleed to death?", Leung criticised the media for its coverage of her daughter and urged it to stop reporting on her situation. She went on and slammed Ivan Choy Chi-keung, a political science lecturer at the Chinese University of Hong Kong for his article in Ming Pao which criticised the Chief Executive who posted a family picture in Hyde Park after his daughter's Facebook posting with smiles and harmonious tone, in which his daughter later said it was her father idea to take the picture and she thought it was a poor PR stunt. Choy said Leung Chun-ying was exploiting his daughter and quoted the Chinese saying, "Even a vicious tiger will not eat its cubs". Regina Leung criticised Choy by saying that "Mr Choy based his article on fragmented information he obtained by himself and from the media and used mean words in his malicious criticism," she said. "Mr Choy's behaviour shows he is shallow, ignorant, cold-blooded and unfeeling … I worry for his students for having such a 'teacher'." Choy hit back by saying that Leung did not have to shout insults in public and was inappropriate. Leung also said that her daughter had been dealing with health and emotional issues for a few years.

=== Domestic violence allegation ===
In March 2015, Leung's daughter Leung Chai-yan claimed that her mother hit her in a rage. "My mother literally just pushed me up against a wall slapped me and called me a [stupid ... whore ...] kicked me – I fell, hit my spine against corner of study table. Lovely," Leung wrote. She also claimed that her mother threatened to call the police and carpet-searched her room. She added, "I genuinely think if I were on the 20th floor of a building instead of being in [Government House], I [would've] jumped … There is no way out." Ambulances were called to the Government House on 17 March and Leung Chai-yan said she had been "held against her will" at home. Chief Executive Leung Chun-ying declined to comment, apart from asking the public to "give her some room". A group of 10 college students organised a demonstration in support of Chai-yan and demanding government departments to take action against domestic violence.

=== 2015 Halloween incident ===
On 31 October 2015, Leung's daughter Leung Chai-yan celebrated Halloween at a number of nightclubs and parties in the Lan Kwai Fong area in Central and had a dispute with a taxi driver around 3 am on 1 November 2015. Her mother later arrived to the scene which enraged Leung Chai-yan. As Regina helped her daughter into the taxi, the latter was captured slapping Regina in the face twice, and her daughter refused to enter the vehicle. Regina was seen cradling her own cheek in shock. "You know this mum is not my actual biological mother," added Leung to the small crowd gathered at the scene. Leung later said she believed her daughter was "tipsy" at the time and had no intention of offending anyone. She also urged the media and internet users to give Chai-yan more space.

=== Airport security "special arrangement" allegation ===
On 7 April 2016, local Chinese newspaper Apple Daily reported that Leung Chun-ying allegedly requested over the phone that airline staff help his younger daughter, Leung Chung-yan, who had left a piece of luggage outside the restricted area when she was with her mother Regina Leung at the boarding gate for Cathay Pacific flight CX872 to San Francisco on 28 March. In an "internal document" allegedly detailing the incident published by Apple Daily, "Ms Leung asked us many times to claim her bag on her behalf from [Avseco] to boarding gate ... she did not want to waste time ... also she told us that she must be getting on the flight," the document said. Avseco is an aviation security firm. Secretary for Transport and Housing Anthony Cheung said that the Hong Kong Airport Authority is looking into allegations. The policy regarding luggage handling was changed subsequently to allow people like her to abuse airport security.

=== Fashion sense ===
Leung has been criticised for her fashion choices. Her clothing choices during first official trip in Beijing with husband Leung Chun-ying was criticised by fashion expert William Tang Tat-chi. She was nicknamed as "lobster" after having worn a red floppy dress in a public function. The bright red evening dress with long sleeves caught the public's imagination, and spawned numerous internet memes.

== Nicknames ==
Besides "lobster", Leung was also nicknamed "Mrs. So and so" (乜太), a fictional character played by Liu Wai-hung in variety show Enjoy Yourself Tonight in the 80s.

Unofficial roles
Preceded by Selina Tsang	Spouse of the Chief Executive of Hong Kong; 2012–2017	Succeeded by Lam Siu-por
