= Jeanne Lee Crews =

American engineer at NASA

- Born: 1940 (age 85–86)
- Education: University of Texas; University of Florida (BS)
- Occupation: Aerospace engineer
- Employer: NASA
- Known for: Multi-shock shield ("Space Bumper"); First female engineers at NASA; Hypervelocity research
- Title: Assistant to the Division Chief, NASA (Retired)
- Awards: NASA Exceptional Service Medal; NASA Exceptional Achievement Medal; Silver Snoopy award Women in Aerospace Lifetime Achievement Award

Jeanne Lee Crews (born 1940) was an American aerospace engineer at NASA, and also one of the first female engineers to join the agency. She retired in November 2002 and is now living in Satellite Beach, Florida. In order to protect spacecraft from debris, she designed a "flexible multi-shock shield to protect spacecraft from debris," which is still in use on the International Space Station today. Jeanne Lee Crews is also one of the first women at NASA to participate on a zero-G flight. She has more recently been working on a way to gather and accumulate orbital debris, through a large balloon that will return to Earth once full. Jeanne Lee Crews has been awarded with Aerospace Lifetime Achievement Award, the NASA Exceptional Service Medal, and the NASA Exceptional Achievement Medal.

== Early life ==
Jeanne Lee Crews was born in 1940. Jeanne Lee Crews's interest in space and science began when she was about 8 years old. She loved all kinds of science. Jeanne first believed she would be an astronomer. Her father was a pilot in the Air Force. Both her mother and father were supportive of her love for science and supplied her with telescopes, microscopes, or anything she had an interest in. Sputnik and the space race ignited her passion for space even further. Jeanne began acquiring her college degree at the University of Texas with a major in Aerospace engineering. Jeanne was one of ten engineering freshman who was invited to take a physical chemistry course with graduate students. She then finished getting her B.S. in aerospace engineering at the University of Florida.

In September 1964, Jeanne was hired at NASA as an engineer. She was one of the first women engineers hired there. Jeanne expressed in an oral interview, "... I really had to work hard to get the responsibility. Everybody wanted to hold my hand. Now, I know that sounds, “Well, isn’t that nice?” But it isn't when you're really trying to prove yourself... I didn't blame them; I really didn't. They just didn't know how to handle me." Once hired, she went to Houston, Texas.

== Career at NASA ==
Crews worked on the Apollo landmarks as the zero gravity flights were taking place. She later worked on projects such as Skylab. Jeanne took flight in the zero gravity plane. Other than nurses who were asked to come on the plane, Jeanne was one of the first women on the zero-G plane.

Jeanne created the hyper velocity laboratory where her work was focused on protecting Spacecraft and satellites from impacts from space debris and meteoroids. It was evident by now that when a spacecraft collides with even minuscule pieces of space debris, which are traveling at orbital speeds, the damage and impact could be severe, and even life-threatening. The multi shock shield was a project Jeanne invented. She first started out by creating a small hydrogen fueled gun in order to test materials. She used the gun to see how well the spacecraft could withstand high-velocity impacts. After multiple tests, Jeanne soon realized that the aluminum that is used normally to build spacecraft was especially vulnerable to debris collisions. The solution she thought of was a shield comprising "multiple layers of ceramic fabric, open-cell foam and other materials." This layered shield repeatedly shocked impacting particles in order to protect the spacecraft. She created a shield from fabric to make it weigh less, yet have more strength. This is known as the flexible multi-shock shield. It was patented and belongs to NASA and is still in use today on the International Space Station. The shield Is designed to protect from impacts of debris with densities of 2.7 g/cm^{3}, as well as impact velocities of 16 km/s.

While working at NASA, Crews was able to fly some of the training simulators. She could do so as long as no reporters saw her get in or out of the simulators. Donald K. Slayton told Jeanne she should not be photographed because they did not want anyone thinking that there was a woman astronaut.

More recently, Lee Crews has been working on a method to collect orbital debris. Her design is a very large balloon, between 1 and 10 km in diameter, made of ceramic fabric that will "shock whatever has struck the craft so much that is vaporized. If you have four or five sheets, one behind the other, you shock it repeatedly and raise energy levels so much you get more vaporization and it gets smaller and smaller." Once the balloon is full, it is returned to Earth

Throughout Jeanne's years at NASA, she was an engineer, contract monitor, and a researcher at Space and Life Sciences. Towards the end of her career, she was the Assistant to the Division Chief. In November 2002, Crews retired from NASA.

== Awards ==
In 1990, Jeanne was awarded a Patent For the multi-shock shield along with her co-inventor Burton G. Cour- Palais. In 1992, she was awarded the Tech Brief Award, along with Cour- Palais and Eric Christiansen. She was also awarded the Women in Aerospace Lifetime Achievement Award. In 1993, she won the Board Award, otherwise known as a NASA Headquarters Space Act Award, as well as the NASA Exceptional Service Medal. In 1995, she won the NASA Exceptional Achievement Medal. That same year, she was also awarded the Board Award for Debris Shield, Board Award for Weight Reduction Design, and the Patent Award, again. In 1998, she won the Tech Brief Award, again. In 1999, she won the Silver Snoopy Award as well as the Tech Brief Award. in 2006, Jeanne was honored for "Far-Reaching Inventions."
