= Janet Lam =

Spouse of the Chief executive of Hong Kong

- 李林麗嬋
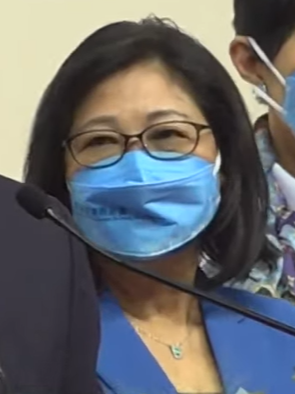
- Lam in 2022

Spouse of the Chief Executive of Hong Kong
- Incumbent
- Assumed role 1 July 2022
- Chief Executive: John Lee
- Preceded by: Lam Siu-por

Personal details
- Born: Janet Lam Lai-sim British Hong Kong
- Spouse: John Lee (m. 1980)
- Children: 2
- Occupation: Singer

Janet Lee Lam Lai-sim (Chinese: 李林麗嬋) is the spouse of John Lee Ka-chiu, who has been serving as the 5th and current Chief Executive of Hong Kong since 1 July 2022.

== Biography ==
Lam married her husband John Lee Ka Chiu in 1980, who was then aged 22. Gilbert Lee Man-lung and Jacky Lee Man-chun, who attended Wah Yan College, are their sons. Singing in a band with the wives of three former and current chiefs of the police service, she was a singer.

On 8 May 2022, her husband won the 2022 Hong Kong Chief Executive election, as the sole candidate approved by China. He took office on 1 July 2022, making Lam the first lady of the Chief Executive of Hong Kong.

In September 2022, she was introduced as the president of The Community Chest of Hong Kong. Additionally, she served as a judge for the Miss Hong Kong 2022.

== Age speculations ==
Lam's age was never officially confirmed. It is known that Lam had studied in True Light Girls' College, which was established in 1973. Sources quoted by media said Lee, who graduated from secondary school in 1977, did not go to university after Lam, then his girlfriend, became pregnant.

Unofficial roles
Preceded by Lam Siu-por	Spouse of the Chief Executive of Hong Kong; 2022–present	Incumbent
