= John Lee Ka-chiu =

Chief Executive of Hong Kong since 2022

The Honourable John Lee Ka-chiu GBM SBS PDSM PMSM
- 李家超
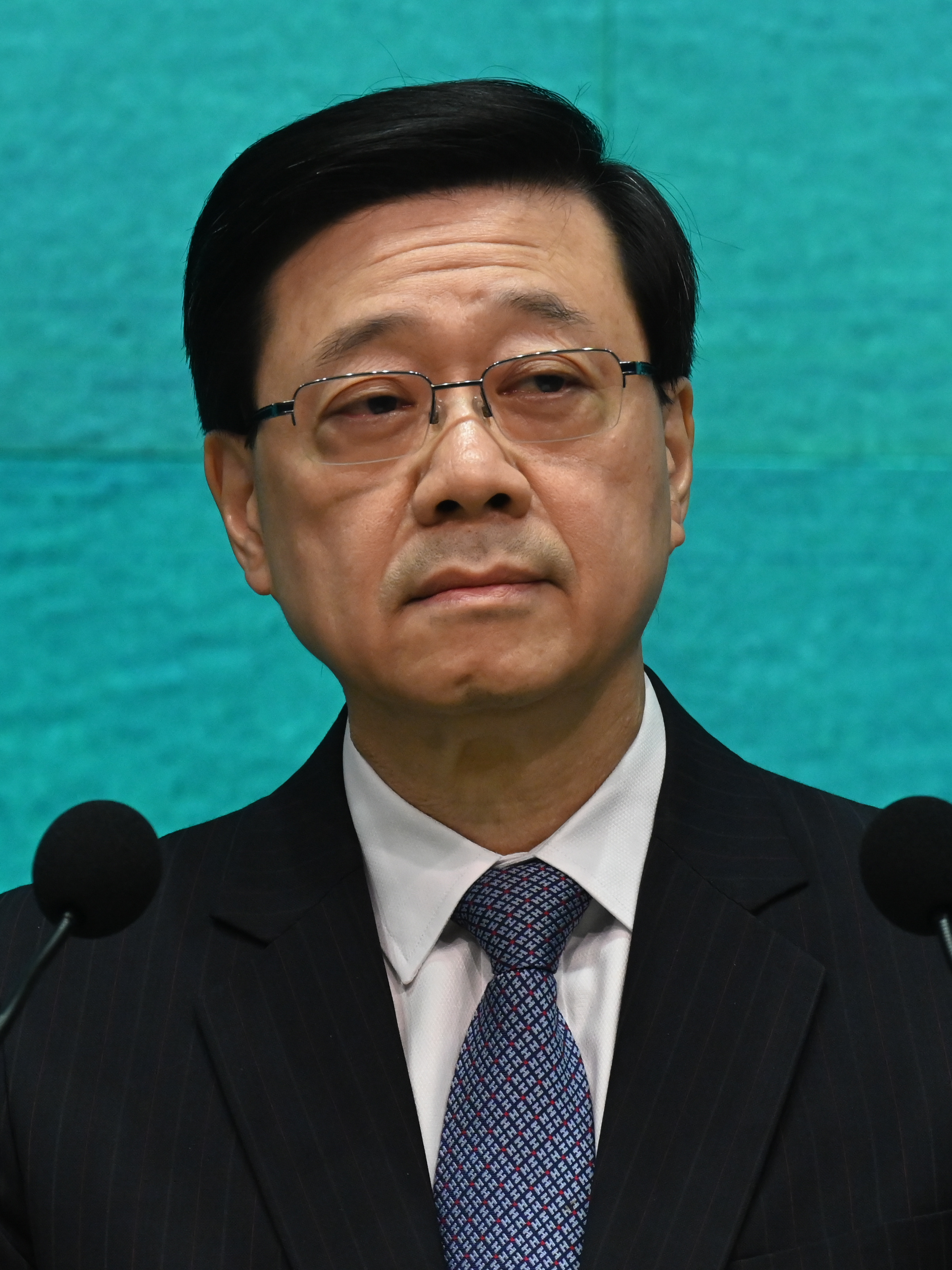
- Lee in 2023

5th Chief Executive of Hong Kong
- Incumbent
- Assumed office 1 July 2022
- President: Xi Jinping
- Premier: Li Keqiang; Li Qiang
- Preceded by: Carrie Lam

8th Chief Secretary for Administration
- In office 25 June 2021 – 7 April 2022
- Chief Executive: Carrie Lam
- Preceded by: Matthew Cheung
- Succeeded by: Eric Chan

5th Secretary for Security
- In office 1 July 2017 – 25 June 2021
- Chief Executive: Carrie Lam
- Preceded by: Lai Tung-kwok
- Succeeded by: Chris Tang

2nd Under Secretary for Security
- In office 1 October 2012 – 1 July 2017
- Secretary: Lai Tung-kwok
- Preceded by: Lai Tung-kwok
- Succeeded by: Sonny Au

Personal details
- Born: Lee Ka-chiu; 7 December 1957 (age 68) British Hong Kong
- Citizenship: China (Hong Kong) (since 1997); United Kingdom (until 2012)
- Spouse: Janet Lam (m. 1980)
- Children: Gilbert Lee Man-lung; Lee Man-chun
- Education: Charles Sturt University (MPPA)
- Police career
- Department: Hong Kong Police Force
- Service years: 1977–2012
- Rank: Deputy Commissioner of Police (Management)
- Awards: PDSM; PMSM
- John Lee's voice Lee responds to Agnes Chow's self-exile at his weekly press conference Recorded December 5, 2023

Chinese name
- Chinese: 李家超
Transcriptions
Standard Mandarin
- Hanyu Pinyin: Lǐ Jiāchāo
- Bopomofo: ㄌㄧˇ ㄐㄧㄚ ㄔㄠ
- Wade–Giles: Li3 Chia1-chʻao1
- IPA: [lì tɕjá.ʈʂʰáʊ]
Yue: Cantonese
- Yale Romanization: Léih Gāchīu
- Jyutping: Lei5 Gaa1 ciu1
- IPA: [lej˩˧ ka˥.tsʰiw˥]

John Lee Ka-chiu GBM SBS PDSM PMSM (Chinese: 李家超; born 7 December 1957), also spelled as John KC Lee is a Hong Kong politician and former police officer who is the fifth and current chief executive of Hong Kong since 1 July 2022.

Originally a police officer, Lee served as the deputy commissioner of the Hong Kong Police Force from 2010 till 2012, when he was appointed under secretary of security under the Leung government. After Carrie Lam became chief executive in 2017, Lee was promoted to secretary for security. In 2021, he succeeded Matthew Cheung as chief secretary for administration, a post he served until 2022.

Lee was the sole candidate approved by the central government of China in the 2022 Hong Kong Chief Executive election. He was subsequently chosen to succeed Carrie Lam, taking office on 1 July 2022. A pro-Beijing politician, Lee is known as being a hardliner against the pro-democracy camp in Hong Kong, having played a key role in the crackdown of the opposition. He signed the local legislation Safeguarding National Security Ordinance into law in 2024. In 2026, he launched the city's first Five-Year Plan.

== Early life and education ==
Lee was born on 7 December 1957 in Hong Kong, with ancestral roots from Panyu, Guangzhou. He grew up in So Uk Estate, Kowloon. He graduated from Wah Yan College, Kowloon, a secondary school run by the Roman Catholic Jesuit religious order.

Lee obtained 4A in the Hong Kong Certificate of Education Examination and 1A in the Hong Kong Advanced Level Examination, and was offered admission to the undergraduate engineering program at the University of Hong Kong. He did not enroll and instead joined the Royal Hong Kong Police Force, citing family reasons.

In 1980, John Lee married Janet Lee Lam Lai-sim (李林麗嬋). They have two sons.

During his tenure as a police officer, Lee received a Master of Public Policy and Management from Charles Sturt University in Australia through a programme sponsored by the Hong Kong Police Force.

== Career ==
=== Police officer ===
On 15 August 1977, at the age of 19, Lee joined the Royal Hong Kong Police Force as a probationary inspector. He became a Chief Inspector on 11 May 1984. He became Chief Superintendent in 1997, Assistant Commissioner in 2003, senior assistant commissioner in 2007 and Deputy Commissioner in 2010. Having served in a wide range of operational duties, including the CID, Complaints Against Police, Service Quality, Personnel, Training, Information Systems, Finance, Policies Formulation, Planning and Development, Lee had been the Commander of Kowloon West Region, Assistant Commissioner (Crime) and Director of Crime and Security, and Deputy Commissioner (Management).

As an Assistant Commissioner, he was involved in the investigation of the case of corrupt Police Constable Tsui Po-ko.

=== Security Bureau ===
Lee was appointed Under Secretary for Security in 2012 by chief executive Leung Chun-ying and promoted to Secretary for Security in July 2017 in the Carrie Lam administration.

In 2019, Lee played a key role in the push for the 2019 Hong Kong extradition bill.

On 3 July 2020, the Chinese state-run Xinhua News Agency stated that the Committee for Safeguarding National Security of the Hong Kong Special Administrative Region was formally established. There were 10 members of the committee. As the Secretary for Security of Hong Kong, Lee was a member of the committee. In October 2020, Lee told Shenzhen Satellite TV in an interview that he was thankful for Beijing pushing through the Hong Kong national security law. In December 2020, Lee defended the freezing of bank accounts belonging to former Democratic Party legislator Ted Hui, and said that other bank accounts, including those of suspect's relatives, could be frozen if they were believed to be related to a crime.

In January 2021, after the arrest of 53 pro-democracy figures, Lee stated to the Legislative Council that they were arrested for "subverting state power". Lee also stated that "The Security Bureau strongly reaffirms and fully supports the Police's operation, which is resolute and professional." In addition, Lee stated that the opposition figures' attempts were "evil" and meant to "overthrow" the government. On 15 January 2021, Lee said that the new National Security Law would include police surveillance of communications, potentially giving the police more power to intercept and read communications. In April 2021, Lee said that Hong Kong's disciplined services would adopt PLA-style goose step marching in order to demonstrate "nationalistic sentiments" and to "strengthen awareness of national security". In July 2022, Lee as Chief Executive said that "This time, we've comprehensively adopted the Chinese-style marching, which fully reflects the police's national identity and sense of belonging to the country, and also represents a solemn commitment to the trust bestowed by the nation, and loyalty to the country".

=== Chief Secretary for Administration ===
On 25 June 2021, the HKSAR Government announced that the State Council has on the recommendation of the Chief Executive appointed Lee as Chief Secretary for Administration, making him the third former police officer after William Caine, the founding head of the Hong Kong Police Force who served as Colonial Secretary from 1846 to 1854, and Francis Henry May, Captain Superintendent of the Police Force from 1893 to 1901 and Colonial Secretary from 1902 to 1911, to have served in the second-highest governmental position in Hong Kong.

In January 2022, after the arrest of employees from Stand News, Lee said that US media groups should support law enforcement, claiming that "If you are genuinely interested in press freedom, you should support actions against people who have unlawfully exploited the media as a tool to pursue their political or personal gains". On 4 March 2022, Lee invoked emergency regulation to announce the construction of a bridge linking Hong Kong with Shenzhen; however, satellite images showed that construction appeared to have begun five days before Lee had invoked the emergency regulation. The border is drawn at the halfway point in the Shenzhen River, and photos show that a barge was on the Hong Kong side on 27 February 2022. On the day of the emergency regulation was announced, photos show that the bridge was past the halfway point on Hong Kong's side, extending just meters away from Hong Kong land.

On 6 April 2022, Lee resigned and planned to join the 2022 Chief Executive election. His resignation was approved by the State Council of China on the following day.

== Chief Executive (2022–present) ==
=== 2022 Chief Executive election bid ===
On 6 April 2022, Lee resigned and planned to join the 2022 Chief Executive election. His resignation was approved by the State Council of China on the following day. He formally announced his candidacy on 9 April 2022. Lee was the sole candidate who had the blessing of the General Secretary of the Chinese Communist Party Xi Jinping's administration in the 2022 Hong Kong Chief Executive election, which was communicated by the Liaison Office. The Office reportedly told the Election Committee that Lee would be the only candidate given permission by Beijing to be Chief Executive. His selection was seen as a move by the Chinese government to focus further on security and further integrate Hong Kong with mainland China.

Lee's campaign manager, Tam Yiu-chung, revealed that Lee would develop a political manifesto by the end of April. Tam later claimed that the political manifesto would not be key for the public to support Lee. Lee dismissed criticism that the Election Committee members were nominating him without seeing his manifesto, claiming that the Election Committee members already knew him and could trust him. Despite having no competitors in the election, Lee said that the election run was "not easy". In October 2023, Lee said "Anyone who takes part in elections knows they must work hard, as nominations are not at your fingertips. They must use all methods available."

FactWire reported that Lee's two sons (Gilbert Lee and Jacky Lee) have business relationships with Election Committee members, but Lee said there was no conflict of interest. In the report, FactWire said that Gilbert Lee's direct manager is Diana Ferreira Cesar, who sits on the finance subsector of the Election Committee. Additionally, Jacky Lee is a business partner of Li Sing-tui, an ex-officio member of the Election Committee. Lee violated the Election Ordinance by submitting late paperwork, but was exempted from penalty in August 2022. For Lee's election forum, seven media stations will cohost the broadcast, with one politician criticizing plans for it, stating that questions are restricted, with no audience member interaction, and the forum being pre-recorded rather than live.

==== Appointment ====
Lee was the sole approved candidate, and of 1,461 Election Committee voters, 8 rejected him, 4 cast blank ballots, and 33 did not vote. He was formally appointed by premier Li Keqiang on 30 May 2022 and the cabinet he nominated was approved by the State Council of China on 19 June. He was officially sworn in on 1 July 2022 in the presence of General Secretary of the Chinese Communist Party Xi Jinping, becoming the third Hong Kong leader with a police background, the others being William Caine and Sir Francis Henry May, who served as acting Governor and Governor of Hong Kong, respectively.

Lee is the third Catholic Chief Executive of Hong Kong after Donald Tsang and his immediate predecessor Carrie Lam. After Tsang, he is the second Chief Executive whose parents came from mainland China.

=== Domestic policy ===
Since John Lee became chief executive, Hong Kong government officials including Lee himself have shown public displays of loyalty towards Xi, similar to the mainland but previously unheard in the city.

==== Housing ====
In June 2022, the Hong Kong and Macau Affairs Office, the Beijing government's office that manages policy around Hong Kong, specifically said that it hoped Lee would tackle the deep-rooted issue of housing in Hong Kong, with more explicit targets, more courage, and more action. On 1 July 2022, Chinese leader Xi Jinping also called on affordable housing to be a priority for Lee's government. On 3 July 2022, Lee said that if the housing supply did not meet targets, both civil servants and government leaders would be responsible. On 19 October 2022, he announced several measures to combat the housing prices, including building 72,000 private residential units over the next five years. Lee has said that he respected the plan to build public housing on parts of the Hong Kong Golf Club's site in Fanling. In October 2023, Lee cut some anti-speculation stamp duties on purchases of housing.

==== National education ====
In July 2022, Lee said that the government would spare no effort to enhance patriotic education, and said that the sense of young people of the nation and national identity would need to be fostered from an early age. In August 2022, Lee said that schools must teach students to respect and safeguard national security. In September 2022, Lee said that teachers would be required to "be cautious" about their conduct, set a "sense of national identity" with students, and also emphasized that "Newly appointed teachers in all public sector schools will be required to pass the Basic Law Test."

In June 2023, after mainland China proposed a Patriotic Education Law for citizens, including Hong Kong and Macau, Lee said that the Hong Kong government would "comply" with its requirements. In October 2023, after the law was passed in mainland China, Lee said that Hong Kong would "fully facilitate the relevant work to co-ordinate within the Government and also the patriotic forces of different sectors in making persistent efforts to promote patriotic education, so as to enable the public to gain further knowledge of the history, culture and rapid development in all aspects of our country and understand the close relationship between Mainland and Hong Kong." A government source revealed that the education sector was not consulted over the changes beforehand, with the chairman of the Subsidised Primary Schools Council saying he still had no idea about the content. Lee had earlier said that for his 2023 policy address, he had 40 meetings and 8,700 pieces of feedback during a 3-month consultation period to have him set priorities.

==== Public hospitals ====
In his policy address, Lee said that the government may implement a minimum period of time in which healthcare professionals must work at a public hospital before they can leave. This caused an uproar among healthcare professionals, according to the president of the Hong Kong Public Doctors' Association. In November 2022, Lee said of the policy "I believe the professionals hold strong affection for Hong Kong and are willing to serve the society." In contrast, John Tsang said that the policy "will only lead more medical professionals to leave Hong Kong." On 11 November 2022, Health Secretary Lo Chung-mau revealed that the plan would include doctors, nurses, and dentists.

==== Transportation ====
In his 2022 Chief Executive Policy Address, Lee announced the Government would prioritise three rail projects and three road projects to improve transport infrastructure and connectivity in Hong Kong. It was reported that all six of these projects would begin consultation later in the year.

The Tseung Kwan O line would extend southwards to the New Development Area of Tseung Kwan O Area 137. As part of the development of Area 137, a new road tunnel would be built from Tseung Kwan O to Yau Tong. In addition, he recommended the construction of Hong Kong‑Shenzhen Western Rail Link, a railway line connecting Hung Shui Kiu to Qianhai, Shenzhen, and the Central Rail Link between Kam Tin and Kowloon Tong via Kwai Chung.

A new highway, the Northern Metropolis Highway, would improve connectivity between Tin Shui Wai and Kwu Tung North increasing road capacity between the Northern Metropolis. A new trunk road between Tai Po and Kowloon West would bypass Sha Tin and relieve congestion from the Tolo Highway.

==== CBD ====
In September 2022, Lee said that "Cannabis is a drug, and the government will categorise CBD as a dangerous drug... to protect the public's health." The move to ban CBD by February 2023 would put it in the same category as heroin, cocaine and methamphetamine.

==== Emigration wave ====
During his leadership, Lee attempted to reverse the emigration wave in Hong Kong triggered by the imposition of the National Security Law in 2020, as well as the strict zero-COVID curbs. On 19 October 2022, he gave a 2-hour 45 minute long speech, saying that Hong Kong would "snatch" global talent. He accordingly released seven measures, including granting graduates from the world's top 100 universities a two-year visa, allowing employers to hire overseas talent more easily, extend employment visas and refund extra stamp duty to foreigners-turned-permanent residents who are still holding property. However, the exodus continued throughout the year, with the government announcing in 2023 that the total of the population fell by 0.9% compared to a year earlier. In July 2023, after a report showed that almost 28,000 students left the Hong Kong school system from 2021 to 2022, Lee said of the emigration wave that "I believe the worst has passed."

==== Northern Metropolis and Lantau Tomorrow Vision ====
In March 2023, Regina Ip said that the Northern Metropolis project should be prioritized over Lantau Tomorrow Vision; Lee then responded by saying both projects would move ahead simultaneously without the need to prioritize one over the other. In April 2023, a survey showed that only 6% of Hongkongers supported Lee's idea to build both simultaneously.

==== District councils ====
In May 2023, Lee announced that district councils would have 88 democratically elected seats, down from the previous number of 452 seats, and lower than when Hong Kong was a British colony. Lee said that "I do not agree that pure[ly] counting election votes means democracy." In July 2023, after the legislative council unanimously passed the resolution, Lee said "The chaos is a wake-up call for us. We must plug the institutional loopholes and completely exclude those anti-China and destabilising forces from the [District Councils].

In October 2023, after potential candidates said they had a difficult time contacting committees (area committees, district fire safety committees and district fight crime committees) to get a mandatory nomination in the district council voting process, Lee said candidates must rely on their "own efforts" to secure a nomination. On potential candidates having issues getting nominations, Lee said that if they "aren't able to meet those basic requirements, they should look into why they have problems."Local media reported that more than 75% of candidates in directly elected seats in the election were also members of committees responsible for nominating candidates. After opposition groups were effectively banned from running in the election by not getting nominations, Lee said it was a "fierce competition."

Lee also said that an attempt by the UK to increase the number of democratically elected seats before 1997 was "an attempt to make Hong Kong an independent or semi-independent political entity, hindering China's resumption of sovereignty over Hong Kong and the implementation of effective governance." In December 2023, after the 2023 district council elections produced the lowest-ever voter turnout, Lee said "I think that was a good turnout."

==== Petitions ====
In September 2023, Lee said he would not restart a long-standing tradition where the Chief Executive could receive petition letters every Tuesday outside of the Chief Executive's Office in Admiralty.

=== COVID-19 pandemic ===
On 5 July 2022 in his first ever weekly news conference as the Chief Executive, Lee said that Hong Kong would look into easing COVID-19 health protocols, shortening the quarantine period in particular. However, he also stressed the aim to prevent the spread of COVID-19 and hospitals from being overwhelmed. He also expressed his awareness for Hong Kong to remain open and convenient to travellers but the risks posed by the pandemic should also be taken into consideration at the same time. In addition, he revealed that he had instructed Secretary of Health Lo Chung-mau to consider the possibility of the move.

On 1 September 2022, Lee announced after his videoconference that people would be allowed to "reverse quarantine" in Hong Kong for seven days before traveling to Guangzhou. Asked about quarantine-free travel to mainland China, Lee said "This proposal of doing quarantine in Hong Kong so as to fulfil the seven-plus-three requirement in Shenzhen is in no replacement of other measures that we always try to seek so as to allow more convenience in allowing people to travel from Hong Kong to the mainland." On 6 September 2022, Lee denied that government officials were in disagreement over pandemic measures with Bloomberg reporting that some officials hoped to end quarantine by November 2022. On 12 September 2022, SCMP reported that Hong Kong's health experts had been issued clear rules by Lee's administration, stating that they should not express conflicting opinion's against the government's official positions. This came after the government's COVID-19 Expert Advisory Panel, composed of six medical specialists, had several members who suggested gradually lifting COVID-19 restrictions, including removing hotel quarantine by November 2022. On 8 September 2022, Lee's administration announced that children as young as 5 years old would need to be vaccinated to eat in restaurants; it is one of the few places in the world that requires vaccination for children. A study released in October 2022 showed that 85% of parents in Hong Kong disagree with vaccinating their children.

On 13 September 2022, Lee held a press conference, where he addressed concerns that people coming from mainland China to Hong Kong did not need to be vaccinated. Lee stated that mainland China had few cases and did not pose a risk, though Hong Kong averaged between 8,000 and 10,000 cases per day; Lee did not address the risk of unvaccinated mainland Chinese catching COVID-19 while in Hong Kong. A day later on 14 September 2022, lawmaker Michael Tien criticized the lack of mandatory vaccination for those coming from mainland China, saying that the lack of vaccination could increase their risk of infection in Hong Kong and place strain on the city's healthcare system. Another doctor, Joseph Tsang Kay-yan, chairman of the Medical Association's advisory committee on communicable diseases, echoed Tien's comments against what Lee said, stating "The risk of travellers from the mainland getting Covid in Hong Kong is high. They need to balance this. If they are infected here, will they occupy our public healthcare system? Will it tighten the supply of isolation wards?" On 16 September 2022, the government backtracked on Lee's statement and announced that arrivals from mainland China, Macau, and Taiwan would need to be vaccinated in order to receive a vaccine pass.

Lee also vowed to host a "successful financial summit" in November 2022 (the Global Financial Leaders' Investment Summit) and that reducing quarantine would require more data. During the press conference on 13 September 2022, Lee warned against comparing the flu against COVID-19, claiming that COVID-19 was 6 times more deadly than the flu, and stating that the situation was still "critical". A day later, medical experts disagreed with Lee's data and estimated COVID-19's fatality rate at 0.098%, lower than the 0.1% recorded for the flu. Dr. Joseph Tsang Kay-yan also mentioned that the death rate of 0.098% could be even lower in reality, due to citizens not reporting their infections, plus an accounting difference, where people who die with COVID-19 are counted as a COVID-19 death, even if the underlying cause of death was not due to COVID-19.

In September 2022, the Hong Kong Association of Athletics Affiliates, organizer of the Standard Chartered Hong Kong Marathon 2022 issued an ultimatum to the government, stating that they would have to cancel the marathon if there were no government approval by 16 September 2022. The date passed without government approval and the event was cancelled; Lee later said "we feel disappointed that the organizer made the decision before the government's reply." On 20 September 2022, Huang Liuquan, an official at the Hong Kong and Macau Affairs Office, made a speech which the Chinese Association of Hong Kong and Macau Studies interpreted as Beijing granting Lee permission to open Hong Kong's international borders. On 21 September 2022, Lee said that Hong Kong is a "highly open, international city in the Greater Bay Area", though SCMP noted that the region has been mostly cut off from the outside world since early 2020 due to travel restrictions. Frederick Ma Si-hang, a former Secretary for Commerce and Economic Development, also called Hong Kong "isolated". On 23 September 2022, Lee said Hong Kong was still aligned with the "dynamic zero-Covid" strategy. A day later, the Centre for Health Protection said Hong Kong is unlikely to achieve zero-Covid.

On 1 October 2022, Lee said Hong Kong would not "lie flat" when fighting COVID-19. On 8 October 2022, Lee said that differences of opinion should not detract from fighting the virus. On 11 October 2022, reporters pointed out that the third-jab rates in Hong Kong and Singapore were similar with Singapore having dropped many COVID-19 measures compared to Hong Kong, but Lee said he would not compare anti-epidemic efforts between the two cities due to differences in healthcare systems and culture, and would continue to hold steady on Hong Kong's "0+3" scheme for inbound travelers. Lee also said that removing all travel restrictions would first require the government to consider many "uncertain factors". On 18 October 2022, Lee said that the government should be careful when further easing COVID-19 restrictions, that a gradual approach was necessary, and that the government would be careful of new variants. Lee also said that the government was working with mainland China to "iron out some challenges" in regards to quarantine-free cross-border travel, and said that details had not been hashed out, stating "I will have to wait for further ideas from our mainland counterparts so that we can really work out the details."

On 20 October 2022, Lee was questioned by lawmaker Michael Tien on why his policy address "made no mention of the [proposed] 0+0 measure and a roadmap of returning to normalcy," with Tien also saying "You used a lot of paragraphs to talk about attracting talent, hosting large-scale exhibits and international events, but these rely on the number of overseas arrivals. And you know these people are most resistant to Hong Kong's anti-epidemic policies." On 21 October 2022, Lee was asked by citizens when the mask mandate would be over, with Lee responding that he would do so only if the child vaccination rate reached a satisfactory level. On 23 October 2022, after the High Court ruled that the government had no power to invalidate vaccine pass exemptions, Lee said "We just had a case in which the government was sued and lost. Hong Kong has no human rights? That's impossible!" The government later changed the law after losing the case to give itself power to invalidate the vaccine passes. On 1 November 2022, Lee was asked about whether changing the law rather than accepting the High Court's decision sent the wrong message about rule of law in Hong Kong, to which Lee said the question was misleading and that changing the law was "is in full compliance with the principle of the rule of law".

On 1 November 2022, Lee said that under the "0+3" scheme, Hong Kong was "full of life". On that day, he also said that Financial Secretary Paul Chan would have to take a PCR test upon arrival in Hong Kong, and will have to isolate if he tests positive; Lee stressed that Chan would not be allowed any exemptions. On 2 November 2022, SCMP reported that Chan tested positive with his PCR test, but did not have to isolate, contradicting Lee's earlier remarks. On 8 November 2022, Lee said that the mask mandate and vaccine pass health code system would be here to stay. When asked about reducing the "0+3" policy to "0+0," Lee deflected and said that authorities are constantly reviewing its policies. On 15 November 2022, Lee said that people should not fixate on dropping restrictions, and that "Everyone has a different understanding of '0+0'. Therefore, I am not going to describe whether we are in [a stage] of "zero-plus-what"." Respiratory expert Ho Pak-leung disagreed and said that the government should cancel restrictions and that "Two months since 0+3 came into place, the government has been offering piecemeal adjustments every Thursday - that's not opening up. The government should open up in one go." On 19 December 2022, Ho again called for the government to cut all ineffective measures, such as testing and isolation. On 24 November 2022, SCMP released an editorial, stating "When Chief Executive John Lee Ka-chiu was freely enjoying the hospitality of Thailand during a visit to Bangkok over the weekend, members of a tour group from the country were having lunchboxes in their hotel rooms in Hong Kong" due to government restrictions in Hong Kong.

In December 2022, a month after Lee told the public to forget about "0+0," Lee was given the "green light" by Beijing to move the city to "0+0" and did so as soon as he had the permission by Beijing to do so. Lee did not consult the Command and Coordination Group that he earlier created, before making the decision. David Hui Shu-cheong, a member of the group, said that the group had not met for months, and that the sudden relaxation of restrictions could add pressure to the local healthcare system. On 28 December 2022, after dropping some pandemic restrictions, Lee said that "In fact, I think society as a whole is preparing because I have been hearing a lot of voices saying this is the thing to be done." In January 2023, Lee said that he opposed an independent investigation into the government's handling of the pandemic, an idea supported by health experts. Lee noted that Singapore had around 1,700 deaths from the virus, much fewer than Hong Kong's approximately 13,000 deaths. In February 2023, when asked on why mainland Chinese no longer had to take PCR tests when coming to Hong Kong, despite accounting for most of the imported cases in the city, Lee said "We have imported cases, but the overall risk is manageable." In February 2023, Lee twice said there were "no restrictions" with COVID-19, despite the city having a mandatory mask mandate. In mid-February, when asked when the mask mandate would end, Lee said he would get advice from "relevant people."

==== Mainland China border ====
Lee has met with mainland Chinese authorities multiple times to discuss COVID-19 and reopening the Hong Kong - mainland China border without quarantine, both as Chief Secretary and Chief Executive. In September 2021, he led a delegation to Shenzhen for a meeting. He did so again in November 2021, and again in February 2022. In August 2022, Lee said that he has had "good dialogue" on fully reopening the border, without providing an estimate on when the border would be opened. In August 2022, Lee was scheduled for another meeting with authorities in mainland China, but did not elaborate on the reopening plan or timetable, saying that "It is better to announce the details when we have reached a certain stage of agreement, otherwise the information will be confusing." Lee cancelled his physical trip on 31 August 2022 and opted for a videoconference instead, and said "We will discuss the cross-border arrangement for residents in Hong Kong and mainland China and I hope that, after thorough discussion, a consensus can be reached." Lee also said "Of course, during our discussion, we will weigh out different options" and "we will actively consider any options". In December 2022, Lee said that talks with mainland authorities on quarantine-free travel had recently restarted again. The South China Morning Post reported that in December 2022, Lee would go to Beijing to further discuss the quarantine-free reopening of the border with mainland China.

In December 2022, Lee said that "I can now announce that the much-awaited reopening of the border with the mainland can now be achieved" in January 2023, though Tam Yiu-chung warned that it would be opened in a gradual manner and not fully. On 8 January 2023, Lee said that he would strive for a full reopening of the border, without a quota. As part of border reopening plans, those from overseas are required to be vaccinated against COVID-19, but those from mainland China will not be required to be vaccinated. Medical experts Ho Pak-leung and Leung Chi-chiu both disagreed with the vaccination exemption and suggested that those coming from mainland China should be vaccinated as a condition to enter Hong Kong, to prevent the local healthcare system from being overloaded. Lawmaker Michael Tien also said that unvaccinated mainland visitors "would actually increase congestion in terms of the availability of beds in our public hospitals." In January 2023, a government spokesperson said that all travelers from Hong Kong to mainland China would need a PCR test, including children and babies; however, children under 3 years old traveling from mainland China to Hong Kong would not need the PCR test. Lee said he "will communicate" with mainland authorities on the discrepancy.

=== Taiwan ===
In August 2022, after Nancy Pelosi visited Taiwan, Lee said "According to media reports, when Nancy Pelosi was in Taiwan, she ignored the successful implementation of One Country, Two Systems in Hong Kong and maliciously criticised Hong Kong's democracy and freedom." Later, Lee endorsed a document Beijing published called "The Taiwan Question and China's Reunification in the New Era". Lee and other government officials were criticized by Lew Mon-hung for "crossing the line" with his statements on Taiwan, as the Basic Law stipulates that diplomatic affairs of Hong Kong are to be handled by mainland China's Foreign Ministry. On 24 November, Lee condemned remarks made by Japanese prime minister Sanae Takaichi regarding Taiwan and doubted the value of exchanges with Japan, with Hong Kong cancelling several official events with the country.

=== 2022 Policy address ===
According to analysis of government press releases in August 2022, Lee did not hold a press conference for 7 straight weeks, the longest break of any Chief Executive in more than 10 years. On 1 October 2022, Lee said that CCP General Secretary Xi Jinping's speech on 1 July 2022 would provide the blueprint for his cabinet's governance. During his election campaign, Lee promised to release "key performance indicators" and initial ideas on alleviating public housing wait times within his first 100 days in office. On 8 October 2022, the first 100 days had been reached, and Lee had not yet made public announcements on either promise. A survey released beforehand showed that 49% of people had no-to-low expectations for Lee's policy address. After his policy address, Lee's satisfaction rate for the address was 33.7%, the lowest out of all maiden speeches given by Chief Executives in Hong Kong.

On 19 October 2022, Lee's policy address included measures to prohibit insulting the flag of Hong Kong, update the Civil Service so that employees practice the principle of "patriots administering Hong Kong", fund HK$60m in "national education" for kindergartens, and conduct a review on District Councils so that they follow the "patriots-only" principle. When speaking about the Civil Service, Lee said that "There are a number of black sheep in our civil servant force that should be excluded." Lee also pledged to build 30,000 Light Public Housing (LPH) units within the next five years, units meant for temporary stays of around 5 years and not meant as a long-term solution, unlike traditional public housing. Lee also said he would aim to reduce the wait for public housing from 6 years to 4.5 years within the next 4 years, using a new composite index that would track both LPH and traditional public housing wait times. The Democratic Party warned that the traditional public housing wait times would not be decreased with the introduction of LPH units, and also said that the government was "playing with words and maths" since LPH tenants would still have to be relocated to traditional public housing at the end of their leases. A member of the Liber Research Community also questioned the new metric and temporary housing, stating "Light Public Housing will increase the number of public flats and the wait may seem shorter. But these are just transitional housing supply and it is not "real" public housing." Lawmaker Tik Chi-yuen also raised similar concerns, saying that "So this does not achieve the ultimate aim [of obtaining public housing]. You are just moving people from one place to another. It is just buying time." Lee later said that the LPH and composite index were not meant to "dress up" and lower waiting time statistics. The Housing Authority recommended that the goal for wait times should be 3 years rather than the 4.5 set by Lee. A day after the policy address, officials later admitted that the LPH scheme was created because there was a failure to boost public housing in the next 5 years. The LPH scheme incurred questions from citizens and netizens, saying that the 30,000 units were making up public housing supply numbers. An editorial by SCMP also mentioned criticism of the playing with numbers.

In September 2023, LPH was criticized by former lawmaker Abraham Shek, who said the projects should have gone through the Town Planning Board so that impact assessments could be properly made, and said "Procedural justice is the custodian of good governance, but the principles of efficiency are tools for better governance ... You cannot [improve] something when you don’t have good governance." On 20 October 2022, Lee participated in a phone-in session with radio stations, where one caller addressed "harsh policies", stating "Hong Kong's always had a lot of talents. It was until the unrest that made people leave. Why are talents leaving? We all know full well. It's not about studying elsewhere or whatever. It's because harsh policies are stronger than tigers... We love freedom in a metropolis like Hong Kong. And we love China, but I dare say it doesn't love us. Japan, the US and the UK all let us in freely. Why are there so many rules [for entering the mainland]? Chief Executive, you know full well, you just wouldn't accept it." On 23 October 2022, Lee defended Secretary for Labour and Welfare Chris Sun, who criticized a cartoonist that made fun of Lee's plans to attract talent to move to Hong Kong.

=== 2023 Policy address ===
In an August 2023 consultation session, figures from the opposition camp were not invited, in contrast to Lee's predecessor, Carrie Lam. In October 2023, the Hong Kong Free Press reviewed 3 key measures (Care Teams, a mentorship program, and a talent visa) from Lee's 2022 policy address, and found potential issues with all of them. Several lawmakers said they were disappointed with Lee's policy address, saying it had a lack of a cohesive focus, with Tik Chi-yuen commenting "It seems like the city leader copied and pasted welfare measures proposed by different parties and NGOs to his policy address. You cannot see a well-designed strategy, with timetable and priorities, presented inside the blueprint." A survey of the public showed that Lee's speech was less satisfactory than his 2022 speech, with 40% of respondents saying they were unsatisfied with his policy address. At the end of Lee's speech, he cited "negativity" from some citizens as the source of some "frustrated" good citizens. Lawmaker Adrian Ho also criticized the speech, saying that the policy was "overly inward-looking, neglecting Hong Kong’s international development" and "neglected to clarify how the city intends to maintain its transparency and diversity in order to preserve its competitive edge and appeal worldwide." Ho also added that Lee "fails to address the fundamental issues impacting Hong Kong's international reputation and relations."

=== 2024 Policy address ===
In October 2024, Lee announced two measures designed to inflate property prices: changing the maximum loan-to-value of properties from 60% to 70%, allowing for buyers to borrow more money, and allowing property purchases to partially count as investments under the New Capital Investment Entrant Scheme visa. Lee also said that democratic reform was "settled" and was "not an issue" during his term. In response to the government stopping the release of data around the number of people below the poverty line, Lee said "But So far I have not seen any useful poverty line derived from the so-called academic research." In October 2024, an economist said that Lee's focus on key performance indicators (KPIs) missed qualitative factors, and said that some KPIs, such as setting up committees, "not really substantial achievements"; other KPIs set by Lee did not have deadlines.

=== Collusion ===
On 20 October, Lee said "First, the so-called "collusion" mentioned in the question just now is a term used to stir up social conflict during the period of anti-China strife [反中亂港] in Hong Kong, and we have to oppose such destructive discourse of sowing dissension and stirring up conflicts... "Collusion" between X and Y mentioned earlier [by Ambrose Lam] is a deliberate attempt to create social division and contradictions." According to Lee, there is an association between collusion with anti-government protest, whereas some government projects, such as Cyberport, were awarded to a single developer and created complaints of collusion.

=== Human rights ===
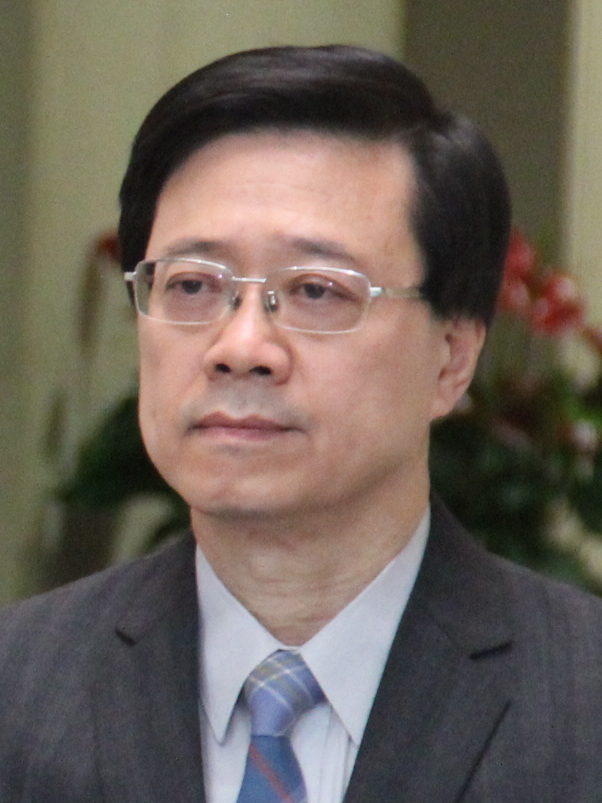
Lee in 2019 as security secretary

==== Glory to Hong Kong ====
In November 2022, Glory to Hong Kong was played during a rugby match in Incheon, between the Hong Kong and South Korea rugby teams. Lee said that the "song that was played was closely connected to the 2019 violence and disturbances, and advocacy for Hong Kong's independence," and said that the Organised Crime and Triad Bureau would investigate the matter. In December 2022, Lee said that he would ask Google to remove the song from search results when querying for the national anthem of Hong Kong. After Google denied the request, Lee said that there was a legal basis for Google to do so.

In March 2023, after another incident, Lee said "The national anthem is a matter of dignity, it is a matter that deals with the emotion of our people. And the people, whose feelings will be hurt, must be taken care of." In July 2023, after the Department of Justice lost an attempt in the High Court to have the song banned, Lee said he ordered the Department of Justice to "take follow-up actions as soon as possible."

==== Jimmy Lai ====
After the Department of Justice lost multiple appeals in an attempt to block Jimmy Lai from hiring Tim Owen as his lawyer, Lee said that he would ask Beijing's National People's Congress Standing Committee (NPCSC) to interpret the national security law to potentially disallow the hiring of foreign lawyers in national security cases. Earlier, three Court of Final Appeal judges, including Chief Justice Andrew Cheung had ruled that Lai be allowed to hire Owen. Lee dismissed concerns that his move to ask the NPCSC to rule in the matter would damage the city's legal reputation, but professor Johannes Chan Man-mun, former law dean of HKU, said that the NPCSC interpretation "may severely compromise Hong Kong as an international city."

Lee also said "The most appropriate way forward is for the NPCSC to issue an interpretation and the case is handled accordingly. This is the approach that is in the best interest of this case and our legal system." When asked about if the decision to get the NPCSC involved would be unfair to Lai, Lee did not comment. On 28 December 2022, Lee thanked Beijing for including the NCPSC interpretation on their next meeting's agenda. On 30 December 2022, the NPCSC ruled that the Chief Executive now has permission to decide whether or not defendants could hire foreign lawyers; Lee welcomed the ruling and said that foreign lawyers could be a threat due to them coming from "hostile" countries. In January 2023, Lee said that the Committee for Safeguarding National Security, a committee he chairs, supported changing local laws to potentially ban foreign lawyers from national security cases.

==== Press freedom ====
In April 2022, Lee said that there was no need to defend freedom of the press, claiming that it already exists. In contrast, a poll done by the Hong Kong Public Opinion Research Institute (HKPORI) interviewed 1,004 people from April 2022 and showed that citizens' satisfaction with freedom of the press had dropped to a new record low.

On 22 September 2022, Lee told "patriotic" journalists at an event to "deliver Hong Kong's latest developments and correct message." Lee warned journalists to distance themselves from "bad elements" that "destroy press freedom", and also said freedom of speech and press were "adequately protected" by the Basic Law. Lee also warned journalists to stay away from unnamed "camouflaged media", to which Ronson Chan, head of the Hong Kong Journalists Association, said "Making such a serious accusation without naming the organisations is not a responsible practice." A survey released on 23 September 2022 showed that faith in press freedom had dropped to a record low, with 93% of respondents citing the government as the source of suppression. In November 2022, after Bao Choy had her appeal rejected, Lee said press freedom was "in the pocket of the people of Hong Kong" and protected by the Basic Law.

In April 2023, Lee refused to comment on multiple reports that journalists in Hong Kong were being physically followed by unknown men; reporters commented that they thought the men were undercover law enforcement officers. In the 2023 Reporters Without Borders press freedom ranking, Hong Kong ranked near the bottom at 140th place of 180 places. In June 2023, HKPORI announced that it would cancel surveys about topics such as the Tiananmen Square massacre and Taiwan, after the government had made "suggestions" to do so. In September 2023, Lee accused "anti-China" forces of using media to threaten national security.

==== Protests ====
In March 2023, after the government required protestors to wear number tags to identify themselves, Lee said that public gatherings must be "in accordance with the law." In April 2023, Lee said that rallies must not endanger national security, and that "When the Commissioner of Police makes the decision, he will also have to consider Hong Kong's situation as a whole, including when in 2019, a lot of public events were hijacked to violate national security, public safety, and public order." In May 2023, Lee told a reporter that the 2019 Hong Kong protests were not "protests," but should be referred to as "black violence."

==== Public libraries ====
In May 2023, after some political books were removed from public libraries, including those from democrats, Lee said that books should not violate any laws, and should "serve the interest of Hong Kong." Lee also said the government has a duty to identify books with "bad ideologies."

==== Tiananmen Square ====
In May 2023, Lee did not provide a yes or no answer when asked if mourning victims of the Tiananmen Square Massacre was legal or not. Other government officials who also did not provide yes or no answers included Paul Lam and Chris Tang. In contrast, Lee's predecessor, Carrie Lam, said during the city's last legal vigil on 4 June 2019, that "Many people share a memory on this day. For the SAR government, this demonstrates that Hong Kong is a very free place. We respect citizens' freedoms of speech, expression, and association, which are also protected by the Basic Law." In June 2023, after some people were arrested during the anniversary of the massacre, Lee said the law is "clearly stated" when asked why they were arrested. Additionally, the government provided "suggestions" that the Hong Kong Public Opinion Research Institute (PORI) stop conducting a yearly survey on how Hong Kong citizens felt about the massacre.

==== Overseas democrats ====
In July 2023, after the government announced bounties for 8 democrats living overseas, Lee said "we will pursue them for the rest of our lives even if they run to the ends of the earth." Lee later said that they were "street rats" who should be "avoided at all costs."

==== Soft resistance ====
In December 2023, Lee said that people who claim the government only focuses on national security matters rather than other livelihood issues are wrong and are committing "soft resistance." In January 2024, after lawmaker Paul Tse said that the government was conducting "high-pressure" law enforcement such as by having "plainclothes police lurk to catch jaywalkers," Lee said that Tse's language reminded Lee of "soft resistance." According to Paul, the Chief Executive Office later apologised to him.

In July 2025, during a summit marking the fifth anniversary of the enactment of the Hong Kong National Security Law, Chief Secretary Eric Chan, Secretary for Health Lo Chung-mau, and Secretary for Security Chris Tang addressed concerns relating to what they described as “soft resistance” activities. According to their statements, such forms of resistance could constitute national security risks, including behavior they associated with an abnormal increase in cancellations from Hong Kong's organ donation registration system. Officials cited an increase of more than 1,600 withdrawals as an example of what they characterized as a “hidden” or “destructive” pattern of dissent, arguing that the trend emerged in connection with public discussions over whether Hong Kong should participate in the China Organ Transplant Response System (COTRS), a cross-border organ-allocation mechanism. Government representatives framed the debate as being sparked by the case of a four-month-old infant who required cross-border medical assistance. Media reports, however, noted that public skepticism toward Hong Kong's organ-donation framework predated the controversy surrounding COTRS. Commentators argued that the rise in deregistrations reflected low levels of public trust in the local authorities’ handling of medical governance and in the perceived transparency of China's organ-donation system. Several outlets reported that the surge in cancellations was not attributed to repeated submissions or falsified requests, but rather to individuals intentionally withdrawing from the registry following official statements by the Department of Health. Academic figures also commented on the incident. In May 2023, sociologist Chung Kim-wah, who had been designated a “wanted person” by the Hong Kong Police for alleged incitement to secession, stated that the government's portrayal of organ-donation withdrawals as a national security concern amounted to what he described as “moral coercion.” Chung asserted that the increase in cancellations stemmed from a wider democratic deficit and diminished public confidence in senior officials, including Secretary Lo and the Chief Executive, within a broader context of perceived legitimacy challenges facing the Hong Kong Special Administrative Region government and China.

Lee expressed despicability for "destroying" the organ donation system and showed strong support for COTRS, describing the decision as an initiative aimed at promoting “love and selfless sacrifice” through "improved" organ-allocation mechanisms. Lee contended that opposition to the proposal reflected an attempt to employ the “Two Systems” framework to undermine the principle of “One Country,” framing the debate as one in which political considerations were being deployed against humanitarian objectives. Lee's remarks generated significant media attention. Several news outlets reported that Lee appeared unusually forceful during a press conference addressing the issue, after asserting that the absence of a legal violation did not necessarily indicate the absence of a national-security threat. Commentators argued that this position blurred the distinction between lawful civic disagreement and activities deemed harmful to national security, prompting further debate about the government's interpretation of dissent and national security.

=== Safeguarding National Security Ordinance ===
The Safeguarding National Security Ordinance was proposed on 8 March 2024 and became law on 23 March under Lee's administration. The law was fulfilled obligations under Hong Kong Basic Law Article 23, and gave the government new powers to enforce Chinese national security. During the election campaign for Chief Executive in April 2022, Lee promised to prioritize the creation of the future security ordinance. However, public consultation did not begin until 30 January 2024. Lee defended the need for the law throughout 2023, and blamed poor communication of the benefits for causing protests.

=== Foreign relations ===
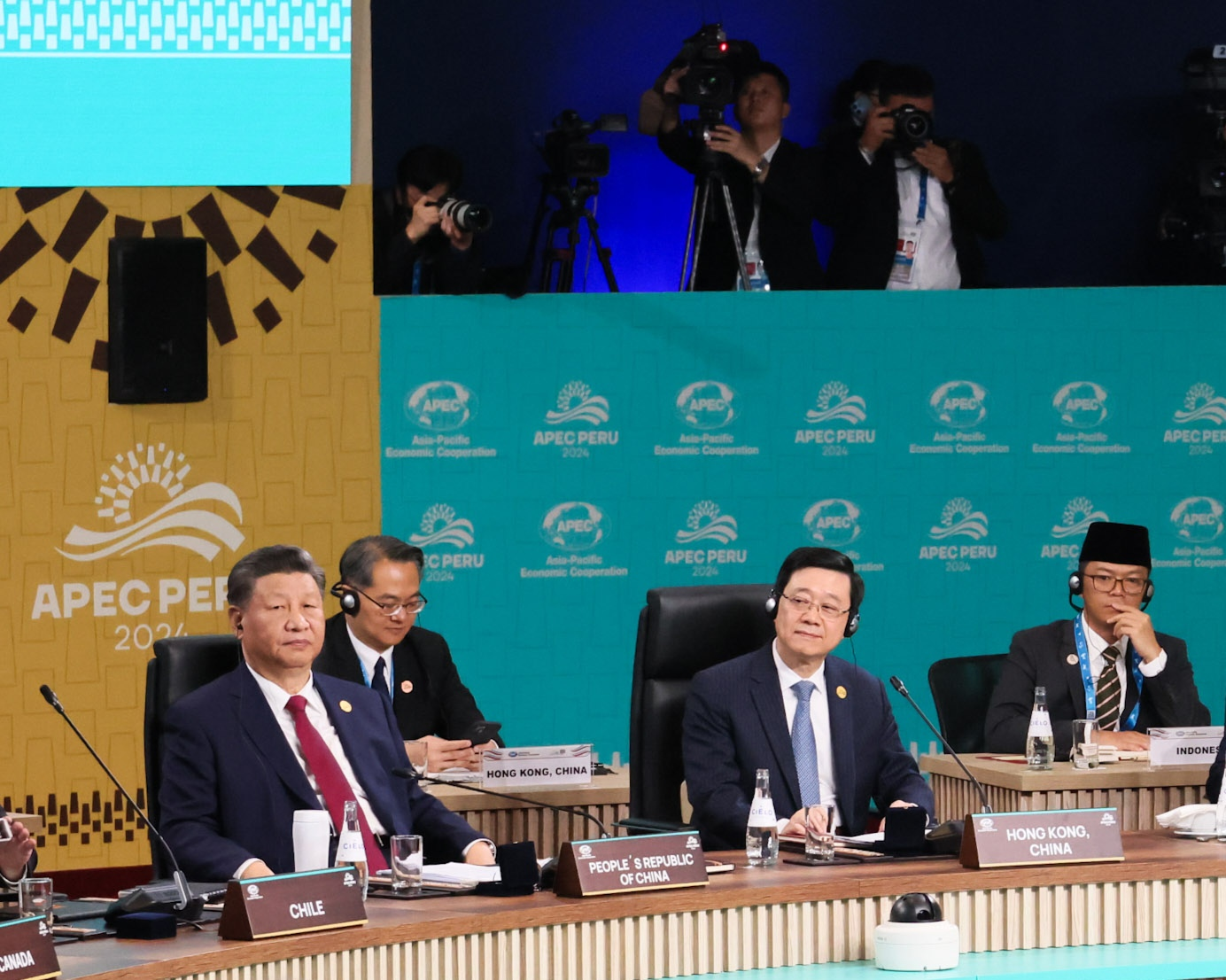
Xi Jinping and John Lee at the APEC Peru 2024

In February 2023, Lee took a trip to the Middle East; later, he wrote an article in South China Morning Post, saying that "Our key message, of course, was that Hong Kong was fully back in business." Earlier, Lee said that he would try his best on the trip to encourage Saudi Aramco to pursue a secondary IPO in Hong Kong. Lee said that his meeting with Aramco was "very positive."

== Personal life ==
In 1980, Lee married his wife, Janet Lam, at the age of 22. This had followed the birth of their elder son, Gilbert. The couple later gave birth to a second son, Jacky. Both sons also received their secondary education at Wah Yan College, Kowloon. Lee hires a domestic helper, who tested positive for COVID-19 in February 2022.

In August 2024, Lee supported the government's position that premarital sex should be avoided.

Lee previously held British citizenship, which he relinquished in August 2012 to follow the legal requirements for assuming the under secretary for security position. However, his wife and two children continue to hold British citizenship, making Lee still eligible for right of abode in the UK.

Lee was awarded the Silver Bauhinia Star by the Hong Kong government in 2017.

When asked in April 2022, Lee did not respond to questions on whether he is Catholic. The following month, he said that he is Catholic.

He is nicknamed "Pikachu" by the Hong Kong anti-establishment faction, as it sounds similar to his Cantonese name "Lee Ka-chiu".

According to his August 2022 declaration of interests, Lee is a "Distinguished Member" of the Hong Kong Club.

=== Health ===
In March 2021, Lee underwent surgery to remove plane warts from his neck.

During the COVID-19 pandemic, Lee had the Sinovac vaccine (CoronaVac), receiving his second dose in March 2021 and his third dose in November. He tested positive for the virus a year later in November 2022, after returning from the Asia-Pacific Economic Cooperation summit in Thailand. He was given antiviral drugs, and two members of his entourage were deemed close contacts.

=== Sanctions ===
In August 2020, Lee and ten other officials were sanctioned by the United States Department of the Treasury under Executive Order 13936 by President Donald Trump for undermining Hong Kong's autonomy. He owns a flat at King's Park Villa in Ho Man Tin, bought in 1997 for HK $12.5 million and fully paid off, eliminating possible issues from his bank and the US sanctions.

On 14 October 2020, Lee was listed on a United States Department of State report as one of 10 individuals who materially contributed to the failure of China to meet its obligations under the Sino–British Joint Declaration and Hong Kong's Basic Law.

On 20 April 2022, Lee's YouTube account for his Chief Executive bid, johnlee2022, was removed by Google as they justified that "the move was required by US sanctions" against the ex-security chief. His Facebook and Instagram pages were still functional, but their payment feature was disabled by Meta, who operates the two social media platforms, for reasons similar to Google's. The suspension of Lee's YouTube account was condemned by Foreign Ministry of China spokesperson Wang Wenbin, who accused "certain US companies" of being "political tools" for the U.S. government.

In October 2022, Lee said of the US sanctions that "It is a very barbaric act and I am not going to comment on the effect of such barbaric act" and "We will just laugh off the so-called sanctions." However, in November 2023, Lee said he despised the "unreasonable" sanctions.

Due to the sanctions, Lee was not officially invited to attend the 2023 APEC summit in San Francisco, United States. Despite receiving a personal invite for the summit, Lee decided to skip due to "scheduling issues" and instead, incumbent Financial Secretary Paul Chan Mo-po represented Hong Kong at the summit. While Chan was meeting with leaders including US President Joe Biden, Lee was seen pictured in Hong Kong with a roasted pig and Legislative Council members.

Political offices
Preceded by Lai Tung-kwok	Under Secretary for Security; 2012–2017	Succeeded by Sonny Au
Preceded by Lai Tung-kwok	Secretary for Security; 2017–2021	Succeeded by Chris Tang
Preceded by Matthew Cheung	Chief Secretary for Administration; 2021–2022	Succeeded by Eric Chan
Preceded by Carrie Lam	Chief Executive of Hong Kong; 2022–	Incumbent
Order of precedence
First	Hong Kong order of precedence Chief Executive	Succeeded by Andrew Cheung; Chief Justice of the Court of Final Appeal
