= Health in Hong Kong =

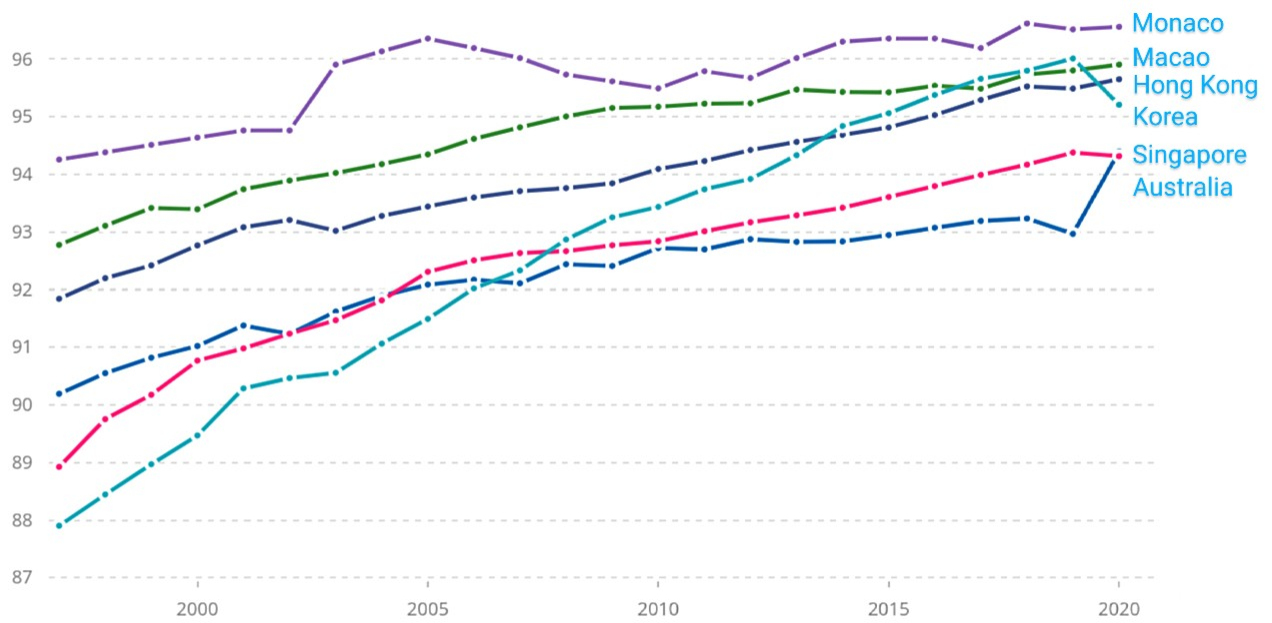
Survival to age 65, female (% of cohort) - Australia, Macao, Hong Kong, Singapore, Korea, Rep., Monaco

Hong Kong is one of the healthiest places in the world. Because of its early health education, professional health services, and well-developed health care and medication system, Hongkongers enjoy a life expectancy of 88 for females and 83 for men, which is the highest in the world, and an infant mortality rate of 1.169 deaths per 1,000 births, the lowest in the world. The proportion of the population over 65 years old is expected to grow from 14% in 2013 to 18% in 2018, and the number of people with a long-term condition is expected to increase by 33% over the same period.

Mental health appears to be more of a problem than physical health. It is reported that the number of mental health patients has increased by 2% to 4% every year since 2011 from 187,000 in 2011–12 to 226,000 in 2015–16. Pressure on children from the competitive education system and high parental expectations is blamed for rising levels of anxiety and depression in young children. Primary school children are reported to spend less time outdoors playing than convicted prisoners.

The Secretary for Health is responsible for formulating and implementing health policies of Hong Kong and is in charge of the Health Bureau. The Bureau oversees the operations of the Department of Health. Public hospital service is provided by the Hospital Authority. Ambulance services are provided by the Hong Kong Fire Services Department, supported by Hong Kong St. John Ambulance and the Auxiliary Medical Service. Air ambulance services are provided by the Government Flying Service.

== Department of Health ==
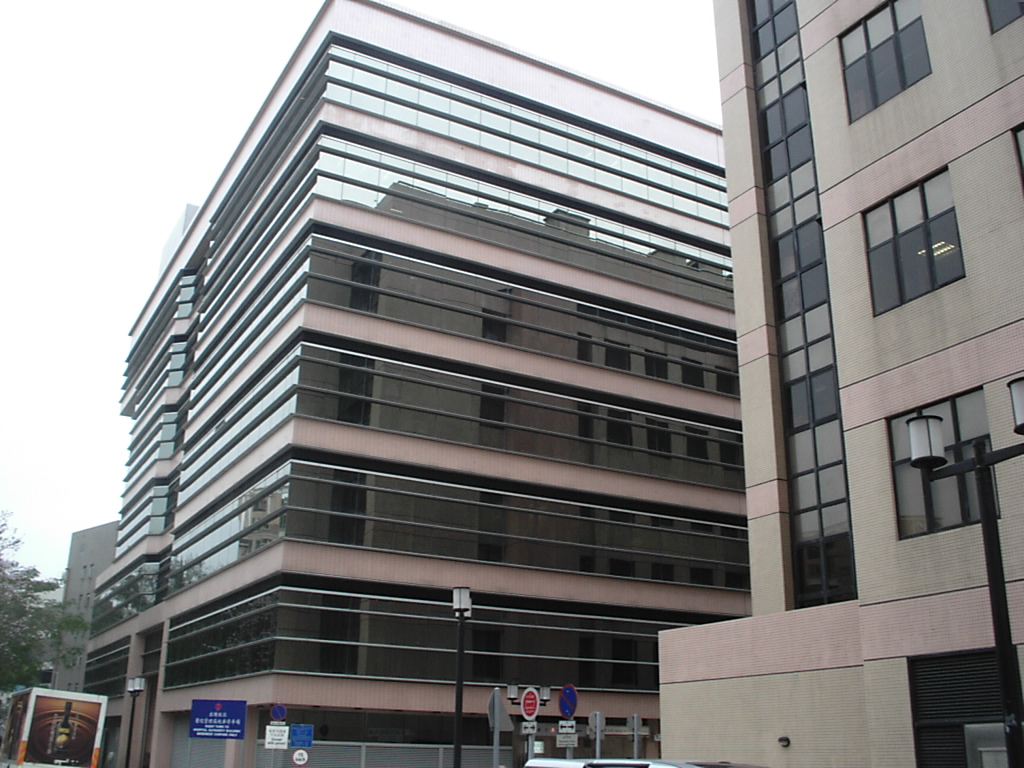
Hospital Authority Headquarters

The Department of Health, under the Health Bureau, is the health adviser of Hong Kong government and an executive arm in health legislation and policy. Its main role is to safeguard the health of the community through promotive, preventive, curative and rehabilitative services in Hong Kong. The main function of the department includes child assessment service, immunisation programmes, dental service, forensic pathology service, registration of healthcare professionals etc., though boards and councils (i.e. Medical Council of Hong Kong, Pharmacy and Poisons Board of Hong Kong) are independent statutory bodies established under the relevant ordinances that operate independently to discharge their statutory functions.

== Medical Institutions ==
There are two medical training faculties established in Hong Kong. They are the Li Ka Shing Faculty of Medicine of the University of Hong Kong and the Faculty of Medicine of the Chinese University of Hong Kong.

== See also ==
- Immunisation Programme in Hong Kong
- Healthcare in Hong Kong
- Health Info World
- Hong Kong Society of Medical Informatics
- Hong Kong Museum of Medical Sciences
- Personal Emergency Link
- Air Pollution Index
- Smoking in Hong Kong
