= Handbag Party =

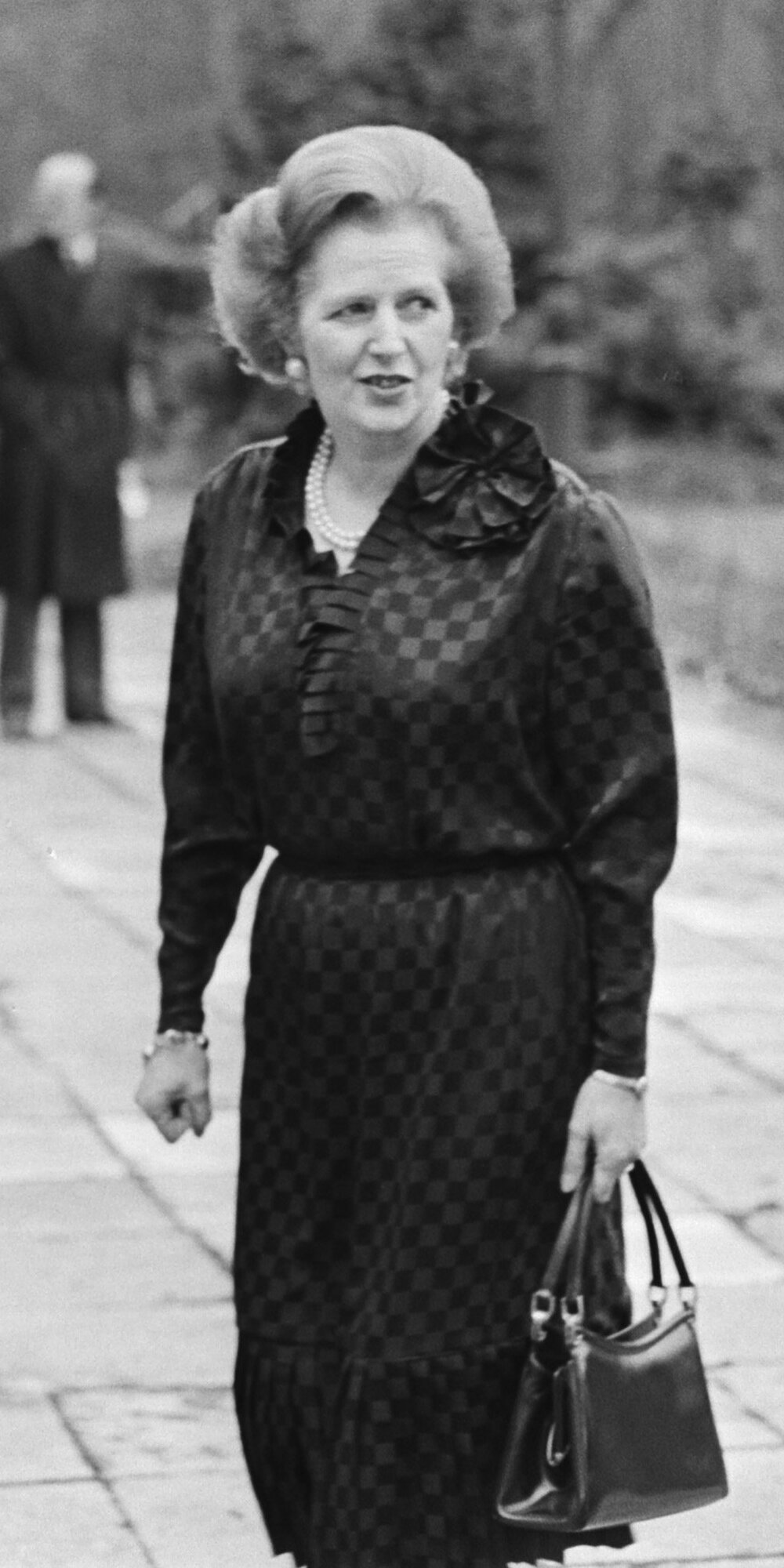
British Prime Minister Margaret Thatcher in 1981, who Handbag Party was said to be modelled on

"Handbag Party", "Handbag Gang", or "Handbag Brigade" (Chinese: 手袋黨) was a group of Hong Kong female senior officials in the late British colonial government and early Chinese administration, led by then-Chief Secretary Anson Chan. The clique was named after they dressed like then British Prime Minister Margaret Thatcher with handbags in hand, and sang for the departing Governor Sir Murray MacLehose in a 1982 farewell dinner. Media described them as "with small handbags but strong audacity and in high-ranking positions".

Soon after the handover, rumoured disagreement between Chan and the inaugural Chief Executive Tung Chee-hwa diminished the power of the Handbag Party. Following the introduction of the Principal Officials Accountability System, most of the members were not promoted to appointed minister-level principal officials and remained as permanent secretary only. As Chan retired early in 2001, others either followed suit or remained in the government of Tung and later of Donald Tsang.

== List of members ==
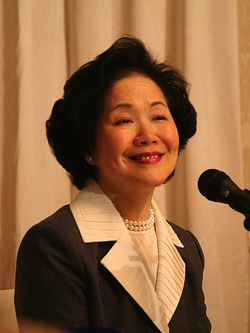
Anson Chan

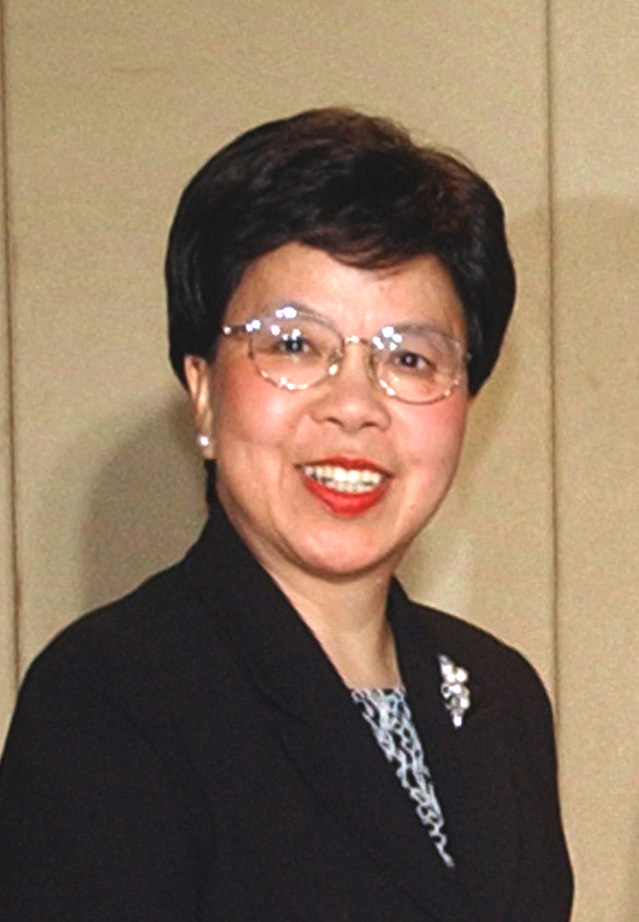
Margaret Chan

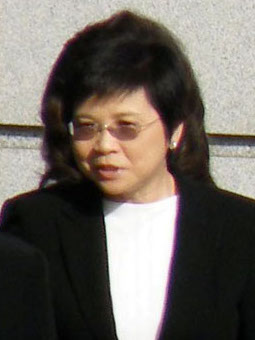
Rita Lau

The clique was led by Anson Chan and with Lily Yam as the number two. Members include:

	Position in 1982	Highest position	After retirement
Anson Chan	Deputy Director of Social Welfare	Chief Secretary (1993–2001)	Member of Legislative Council (2007–2008)
Margaret Chan	Government-employed doctor	Director of Health (1994–2003)	Director-General of World Health Organization (2006–2017), member of Chinese People's Political Consultative Conference
Cheung Man-yee	Radio Television Hong Kong Controller (Broadcasting Services - Radio)	Director of Broadcasting (1986–1999)	Representative to Tokyo (1999–2002)
Katherine Fok	Secretary of Standing Commission on Civil Service Salaries and Conditions of Service	Health Secretary (1994–1999)	Retired
Rita Lau	Administrative Officer at Government Secretariat	Commerce Secretary (2008–2011)	Chairman of Public Service Commission (2014–2023)
Sandra Birch Lee	Administrative Officer at Government Secretariat	Permanent Secretary for Food and Health (2007–2011)	Retired
Shelley Lau	Administrative Officer at Government Secretariat	Permanent Secretary for Home Affairs (2002–2005)	Retired
Lily Yam	Deputy Commissioner of Independent Commission Against Corruption	Environment Secretary (2000–2002)	Retired
Carrie Yau	Administrative Officer at Government Secretariat	Permanent Secretary for Home Affairs (2007–2010)	Executive Director of Vocational Training Council (2013–2021)
Irene Yau	Information Officer	Director of Information Services (1987–1997)	Retired
Helen Yu	Deputy Hong Kong Commissioner in London	Director of Regional Services (1998–2000)	Member of Independent Police Complaints Council
Denise Yue	Administrative Officer at Government Secretariat	Civil Service Secretary (2006–2012)	Retired

Other members said to be part of the Handbag Party include:

- Elizabeth Margaret Bosher, former Deputy Secretary for Economic Services
- Elizabeth Wong, former Health Secretary (1990–1994)
- Baroness Dunn, former Senior Member of Executive Council and Legislative Council (1988–1995)
- Jacqueline Willis, former Commissioner for Labour (1996–1999) and Commissioner for Economic and Trade Affairs, USA (1999–2006)

Carrie Lam, who would become Chief Executive, was also claimed to be a part of the group, but it was denied by Lam herself and Chan, who described her successor as "unaligned".

== Aftermath ==
With CY Leung selected as the new Chief Executive, the last prominent member of the Handbag Party left the administration in 2012. Some of the members leaned towards democracy camp in 2019, with Yue and Chan calling for an independent enquiry over the large-scale protests, which was rejected by the Lam ministry. According to media reports, the group still met often despite their retirement.
