= Gabriel Leung =

Hong Kong epidemiologist

Gabriel Matthew Leung GBS, FHKCCM, FHKAM (Community Medicine), FRCP, FRCPE, Hon FHKCFP, Hon FFPH, JP
- 梁卓偉
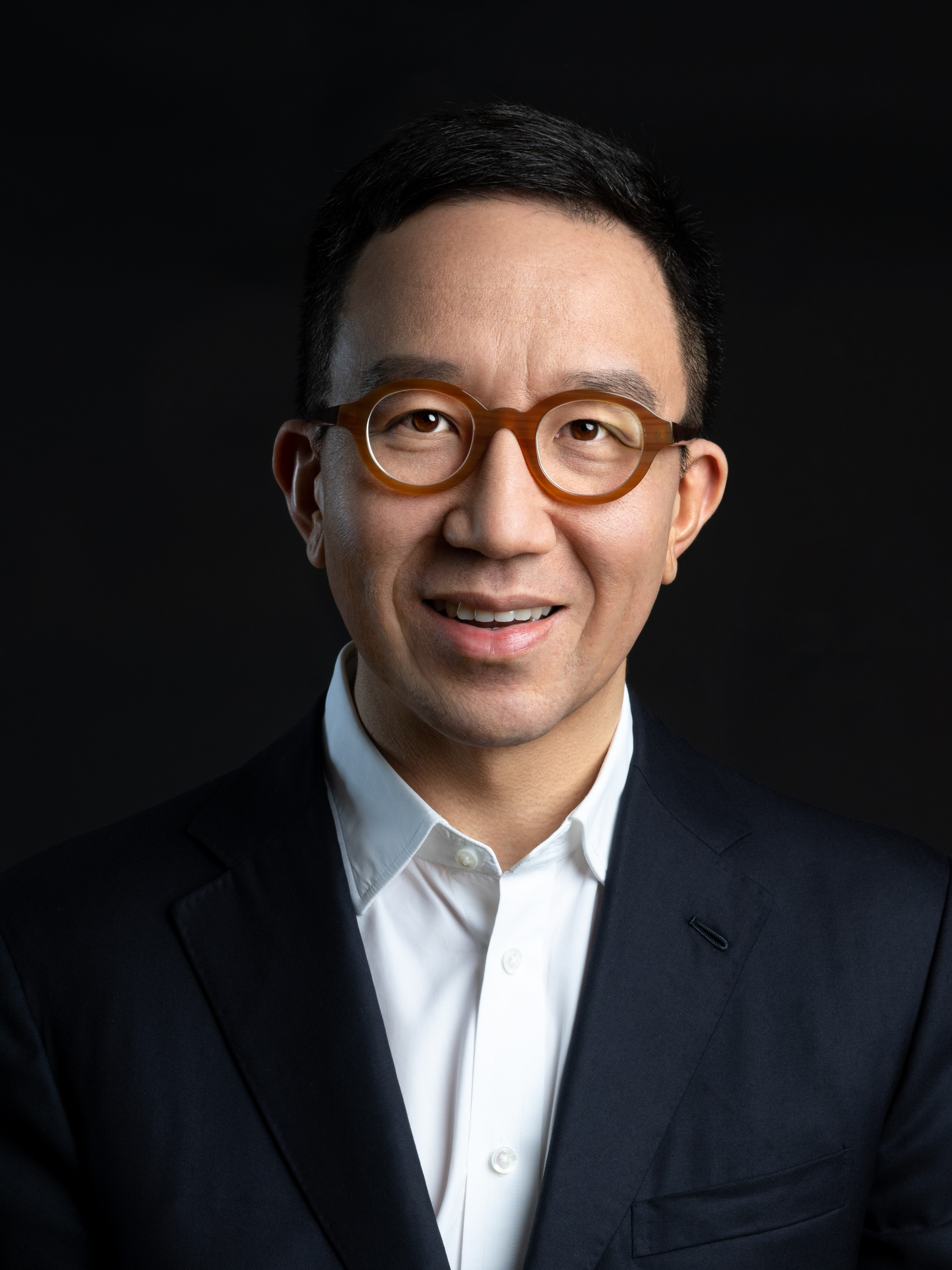

40th Dean of Li Ka Shing Faculty of Medicine, University of Hong Kong
- In office 1 August 2013 – 31 July 2022
- Preceded by: Sum Ping Lee
- Succeeded by: Chak Sing Lau

5th Director of the Office of the Chief Executive, Hong Kong
- Incumbent
- Assumed office 30 September 2011
- Chief Executive: Donald Tsang

1st Under Secretary for Food and Health, Hong Kong
- In office 18 September 2008 – 29 September 2011
- Secretary: York Chow
- Preceded by: Office created
- Succeeded by: Sophia Chan

Personal details
- Born: Gabriel Matthew Leung; 6 November 1972 (age 53) British Hong Kong
- Parent: Carmelo Leung Siu-Tat (father)
- Education: University of Western Ontario (MD); Harvard University (MPH); The University of Hong Kong (MD)
- Scientific career
- Fields: Public health Epidemiology
- Workplaces: Government of Hong Kong; University of Hong Kong
- Thesis: Breastfeeding, method of delivery and environmental tobacco smoke and related impact on infant health and health care (2003)
- Doctoral advisor: Tai Hing Lam

Chinese name
- Traditional Chinese: 梁卓偉
- Simplified Chinese: 梁卓伟
Transcriptions
Standard Mandarin
- Hanyu Pinyin: Liáng Zhuówěi
Yue: Cantonese
- Yale Romanization: Lèuhng Cheuk Wáih
- Jyutping: Loeng^{4} Coek^{3} Wai^{5}

Gabriel Matthew Leung GBS JP FRCP FRCPE (Chinese: 梁卓偉; Jyutping: Loeng4 Coek3 Wai5, born 6 November 1972) is a Hong Kong physician and epidemiologist, currently serving as the executive director (Charities and Community) of the Hong Kong Jockey Club. From 2013 to 2022, he was the longest-serving dean of medicine at the University of Hong Kong, where he was also the inaugural Helen and Francis Zimmern Professor in Population Health. Formerly, he was Hong Kong's first undersecretary for food and health and fifth director of the Office of the Chief Executive at the Government of Hong Kong.

== Early life and education ==
Leung was born in Hong Kong and studied at Wah Yan College. His maternal grandfather was British. He continued his education at Stonyhurst College in Lancashire, England (1986–1989) and Crescent School in Canada (1990). His family moved to Canada when he was 13 in Form 2 (equivalent to Year Eight in England, Wales, Australia and New Zealand), due to his father's job with a multinational company,

Leung undertook his undergraduate education at the University of Western Ontario, majoring in chemistry and minoring music. He then entered the medical school at same university, initially majoring in neurosurgery, eventually switching to public health and completed his family medicine residency training at the University of Toronto. He then received his Master of Public Health degree from Harvard University in 1999, and earned a research doctorate (Doctor of Medicine) at the University of Hong Kong.

== Career ==
In 1999, Leung joined the University of Hong Kong (HKU) Faculty of Medicine (now the Li Ka Shing Faculty of Medicine) as an assistant professor in the Department of Community Medicine (now part of the School of Public Health), and became an associate professor when the School of Public Health was formed in 2004. During the SARS outbreak, he established and directed the Infectious Disease Epidemiology Group.

He was a Takemi Fellow at Harvard University from 2004 to 2005, and, after returning to Hong Kong, expanded the Children of 1997 study together with Catherine Mary Schooling, which followed "the majority of all babies born in Hong Kong during April and May 1997", into a life-course epidemiological study.

Leung was promoted to full professor in 2006 at the age of 33, one of the youngest in HKU's history. He also served as the vice president and censor in public health medicine at the Hong Kong College of Community Medicine from 2006 to 2008.

In 2008, Leung left academia and joined the Government of Hong Kong as the first undersecretary for food and health, during which he led the government's response in the 2009 swine flu H1N1 pandemic. He held the position until 2011 when he was appointed the director of the Office of the Hong Kong Chief Executive.

When his term at the government ended, Leung returned to HKU in 2012 as the head of the Department of Community Medicine until 2013, when the department was incorporated into the School of Public Health, and the inaugural master of Chi Sun College. He was also the acting director of the School of Public Health during this period.

In 2013, Leung was appointed as the 40th dean of the HKU Li Ka Shing Faculty of Medicine and chair professor of public health. At the age of 40, he was the second youngest dean ever appointed at the HKU medical faculty.

During his deanship, the Faculty of Medicine launched the Springboard Scholarships and Second Chance Scholarship schemes to recruit students from more diverse backgrounds. A number of major changes to the faculty took place under Leung's watch, including:

- Amalgamation of Departments of Anatomy, Biochemistry and Physiology into the School of Biomedical Sciences (2015)
- Establishment of the Emergency Medicine Unit (2015) (converted into the Department of Emergency Medicine in 2022)
- Expansion of the HKU Health System to include Gleneagles Hong Kong Hospital as the fourth teaching hospital (2017)
- Introduction of enrichment year in the Bachelor of Medicine and Bachelor of Surgery (MBBS) curriculum (2018),
- Establishment of the Jockey Club Centre for Clinical Innovation and Discovery and the Jockey Club Institute of Cancer Care at the redeveloped Grantham Hospital, supported by a HKD 1.24 billion donation from the Hong Kong Jockey Club (expected to open in 2025)
- Redevelopment of the Sassoon Road Medical Campus (expected to be completed in 2027).

In 2017, it was reported that Leung, together with Zhang Xiang from the University of California, Berkeley, were the final two candidates for the next HKU president. The Council of HKU, however, eventually selected Zhang.

Leung's tenure as dean was renewed in 2018 for a five-year term until 2023.

Leung became the interim director of the School of Public Health, after the former director, Keiji Fukuda, retired in 2021.

Leung resigned as dean in November 2021 to succeed Leong Cheung at the Hong Kong Jockey Club as the executive director (charities and community). He joined the Hong Kong Jockey Club on 1 August 2022.

Outside HKU, Leung was the founding chair of the Asia Pacific Observatory on Health Systems Policies from 2010 to 2014, an elected council member of the Hong Kong Academy of Medicine from 2012 to 2019, the founding co-director of the World Health Organization Collaborating Centre for Infectious Disease Epidemiology and Control from 2014 to 2018, a member of the University Grants Committee from 2014 to 2019, a member of the Hospital Authority Board from 2013 to 2022, and a member of the Youth Development Commission of the Government of Hong Kong from 2018 to 2022. He is currently serving on the Steering Committee on Primary Healthcare Development of the Government of Hong Kong since 2017, the board of directors of the Laboratory of Data Discovery for Health at the Hong Kong Science Park since 2020, the board of governors of the Wellcome Trust since 2021, and the Global Health Risk Framework Commission.

During the COVID-19 pandemic, Leung is one of the experts advising the chief executive and the Government of Hong Kong, even after leaving HKU.

Academically, Leung was an editor for the Journal of Public Health between 2008 and 2013, the inaugural co-editor of Epidemics and an associate editor of Health Policy. He is currently the founding deputy editor-in-chief of China CDC Weekly, and a member of the editorial advisory board of The BMJ.

Leung is an ex-officio member of the Medical and Health Services subsector of the Election Committee of Hong Kong for the 2021–2026 term.

== Research ==
Leung founded and led the Infectious Disease Epidemiology Group during the SARS outbreak.

Leung's research involves several large-scale longitudinal studies, including Children of 1997, FAMILY and the Department of Health Elderly Health Service cohort.

== Personal life ==
Leung is a Roman Catholic.

Leung's interest in music stems from his mother, who taught music in Belilios Public School. He is the principal conductor of the Hong Kong University Philharmonic Orchestra (formerly the Hong Kong University Students' Union Philharmonic Orchestra), and an honorary guest conductor at the Hong Kong Children's Symphony Orchestra, Previously, he sat on the board of governors of the Hong Kong Sinfonietta and the Hong Kong Philharmonic Orchestra (until 1 November 2018), the board of directors of the Asian Youth Orchestra, and the performing arts committee of the West Kowloon Cultural District Authority.

== Controversies ==
Leung's move to the government in 2008 was controversial as HKU retained his professorship, and he held Canadian citizenship at the time. All principal officials of Hong Kong, including the secretaries for the Bureaux, must be filled by Chinese citizens without the right of abode in foreign countries. Although undersecretaries for the Bureaux were not principal officials, they may serve as acting secretaries when the secretaries were unable to hold office. He eventually renounced his Canadian citizenship.

On a press conference about the COVID-19 pandemic on 25 January 2020, Leung and attending government officials asked the public to wear face masks but did not do so themselves. When asked why he did not wear a face mask, he claimed it would make him unable to speak. He was criticised and apologised the following day.

== Awards and honours ==
- Fellow of the Royal College of Physicians of Edinburgh
- Fellow of the Royal College of Physicians
- Honorary fellow of the Faculty of Public Health
- Official justice of the peace, Hong Kong (2008)
- Gold Bauhinia Star, Hong Kong (2012)
- Non-official justice of the peace, Hong Kong (2015)
- Member of the National Academy of Medicine (2018)

Academic offices
Preceded by Lee Sum Ping	Dean of Li Ka Shing Faculty of Medicine; 2013–2022	Succeeded by Lau Chak Sing (interim)
Political offices
Preceded by Raymond Tam	Director of the Chief Executive's Office; 2011–2012	Succeeded by Edward Yau
New office	Under Secretary for Food and Health; 2008–2011	Succeeded by Sophia Chan
Order of precedence
Preceded by Benjamin Tang; Recipients of the Gold Bauhinia Star	Hong Kong order of precedence Recipients of the Gold Bauhinia Star	Succeeded by Lau Siu Kai; Recipients of the Gold Bauhinia Star
