= Chak Sing Lau =

Hong Kong rheumatologist

Chak Sing Lau BBS, JP, FRCP, FRCPE, FRCPGlas, HonFRCPI, Fellow (HKCP), FHKAM (Medicine)
- 劉澤星

41st Dean of Li Ka Shing Faculty of Medicine, University of Hong Kong
- Incumbent
- Assumed office 28 November 2023
- Preceded by: Himself (interim)
- In office Interim; 1 August 2022 – 27 November 2023
- Preceded by: Gabriel Leung
- Succeeded by: Himself

Personal details
- Education: University of Dundee (MBChB, MD)
Chak Sing Lau
- Other names: Wallace Lau, CS Lau
- Scientific career
- Fields: Rheumatology
- Institutions: University of Hong Kong; Queen Mary Hospital; Gleneagles Hospital Hong Kong; University of Dundee; Pamela Youde Nethersole Eastern Hospital; Ninewells Hospital; University Hospital of North Tees; Walsgrave Hospital
- Thesis: Haemostatic abnormalities in Raynaud's Phenomenon and the potential for treatment with manipulation of the arachidonic acid pathway (1992)
Chak Sing Lau
- Traditional Chinese: 劉澤星
- Simplified Chinese: 刘泽星
Transcriptions
Standard Mandarin
- Hanyu Pinyin: Liú Zéxīng
Yue: Cantonese
- Yale Romanization: Làuh Jaahk Sīng
- Jyutping: Lau^{4} Zaak^{6} Sing^{1}

Chak Sing Lau (Chinese: 劉澤星; Jyutping: Lau4 Zaak6 Sing1) is a Hong Kong rheumatologist. He is the current Dean of Li Ka Shing Faculty of Medicine, University of Hong Kong (HKU), the Daniel CK Yu Professor in Rheumatology and Clinical Immunology, and Chair Professor of Rheumatology and Clinical Immunology. Previously, he was the chairperson of the Department of Medicine at HKU, the chief of service (medicine) of Queen Mary Hospital, and the president of the Hong Kong Academy of Medicine.

== Early life and education ==
Lau was raised at Sham Shui Po, Hong Kong, living upstairs from his father's metalworking workshop. He has 9 sisters and is his parents' only son. He attended St. Francis of Assisi's Primary School for primary school and St. Stephen's Church College for secondary school.

In 1978, he went to England and studied for 2 years at the Newcastle College of Arts and Technology (now Newcastle College), and then, thanks to his interest in biology, applied to the University of Dundee School of Medicine. He was mistakenly invited for an interview, but was eventually accepted, obtaining his MBChB in 1985.

Lau returned to the University of Dundee in 1988 for a Doctor of Medicine (MD), which in the UK is a research degree, graduating in 1993.

== Career ==
Lau's residency began right after receiving his MBChB. He spent 1 year as a pre-registration house officer, first as a house physician at Walsgrave Hospital in Coventry, England, which has since been demolished and replaced by a new hospital, University Hospital Coventry, and then as a house surgeon at the University Hospital of North Tees in Stockton-upon-Tees, England. He then worked as a senior house officer for 2 years, undertaking his rotation in internal medicine at Ninewells Hospital in Dundee, after which he went back to the University of Dundee for Doctor of Medicine.

After completing the research degree of Doctor of Medicine (MD), Lau returned to Hong Kong and joined the University of Hong Kong (HKU) as an assistant professor at the Department of Medicine. He was promoted to associate professor 5 years later, and then full professor in 2000. From 2001 to 2007, Lau also served as Assistant Dean of the HKU Li Ka Shing Faculty of Medicine (then still named Faculty of Medicine), first in Information Technology and Planning and then in Education and Student Affairs.

In 2007, Lau returned to the University of Dundee again, becoming the first chair of rheumatology at the college of Medicine, Dentistry and Nursing Studies (now School of Medicine).

He re-joined HKU in 2010 as the chair of rheumatology and clinical immunology and director of the Bau Institute of Medical and Health Sciences Education (until 2018), and 3 years later was endowed with the Daniel C K Yu Professorship in Rheumatology and Clinical Immunology.

In 2013, Gabriel Leung, the new dean of the Li Ka Shing Faculty of Medicine, appointed Lau as the associate dean for teaching and learning. He led the reform of the MBBS curriculum at HKU, transforming Year 3 into "enrichment year", where students may digress from their study and pursue other experiences. The first enrichment year took place in 2018. His Associate Deanship concluded in 2018, and was succeeded by Gilberto Ka-kit Leung. Since 2019, Lau has been the head of the Department of Medicine.

As only the third rheumatologist in the Hong Kong public healthcare system, Lau has served extensively in public hospitals. From 1995 to 2007, he was an Honorary Consultant Physician at the Department of Medicine at Pamela Youde Nethersole Eastern Hospital. After returning from his tenure at the University of Dundee, he reprised the role of Honorary Consultant in Medicine/Rheumatology at the Department of Medicine at Queen Mary Hospital, a position he held between 1997 and 2007. In December 2018, he became a board member of the Hospital Authority. He was the chief of service (medicine) of Queen Mary Hospital from December 2018 until he became the interim Dean of Li Ka Shing Faculty of Medicine in August 2022, and a member of the Hospital Governing Committee of Grantham Hospital. He sat on the Research Council of the Food and Health Bureau and the succeeding Health Bureau of the Government of Hong Kong from 2017 to 2023.

Lau has also served or is serving on a number of local and international public or non-governmental bodies. He founded the Hong Kong Arthritis & Rheumatism Foundation in 2001, and co-founded the Asia Pacific Lupus Collaboration in 2011. He was president of the Hong Kong Society of Rheumatology (1997–2001), the Asia Pacific League of Associations for Rheumatology (2006–2008), and the Hong Kong Academy of Medicine (2016–2020).

During the COVID-19 pandemic, Lau is the convenor of the governmental Advisory Panel on COVID-19 Vaccines. In July 2022, the new Chief Executive of Hong Kong John Lee appointed Lau as a new member of the COVID-19 Expert Advisory Panel.

In March 2022, HKU announced that Lau will become the interim Dean of the Li Ka Shing Faculty of Medicine after the then-current Dean Gabriel Leung's tenure ends. He has indicated that he may seek official appointment if his performance as interim Dean welcomed. He assumed the role on 1 August 2022. He also handed over the position of Chairperson of the HKU Department of Medicine to Hung Fat Tse, and stepped down as the Clinical Stream Coordinator (Medical) at Queen Mary Hospital.

Lau was officially appointed the Dean of the Li Ka Shing Faculty of Medicine on 28 November 2023.

Concurrently, Lau is a member of the Hospital Governing Committee of Hong Kong Children's Hospital, and practices at Gleneagles Hospital Hong Kong, a private, for-profit hospital and teaching partner of HKU. He also sits on the board of directors of the Hong Kong Genome Institute and the Hong Kong Tuberculosis, Chest and Heart Diseases Association.

As interim then official Dean of the Li Ka Shing Faculty of Medicine, Lau has been an ex-officio member of the Medical and Health Services sector of the Election Committee of Hong Kong since 2022. In 2023, Lau was appointed a member of the 14th National Committee of the Chinese People's Political Consultative Conference (CPPCC) representing the health sector, and a General Member of the 14th Beijing Municipal Committee of the CPPCC. He would serve a 5-year term.

== Personal life ==
Lau is an avid long-distance runner, aiming to complete 50 marathon races around the world. As of 2014, he has completed 25, including the Osaka Marathon, and frequently took part in the Hong Kong Marathon.

== Honours and awards ==
- Fellow of the Royal College of Physicians of Edinburgh (1998)
- Fellow of the Royal College of Physicians and Surgeons of Glasgow (1999)
- Fellow of the Royal College of Physicians (2001)
- Non-official Justice of the Peace (2018)
- Honorary Fellow of the Royal College of Physicians of Ireland (2018)
- Bronze Bauhinia Star, Hong Kong (2022)
- Foreign Member of the Academia Europaea (2023)
- Honorary Doctor of Science, University of Glasgow (2024)

Academic offices
Preceded by Gabriel Leung	Dean of Li Ka Shing Faculty of Medicine; 2022-	Incumbent
