= Sum Ping Lee =

American gastroenterologist

Sum Ping Lee FRACP, FACG, FACP
- 李心平

39th Dean of Li Ka Shing Faculty of Medicine, University of Hong Kong
- In office 1 August 2008 – 31 July 2013
- Preceded by: Raymond Hin Suen Liang
- Succeeded by: Gabriel Leung

Personal details
- Born: 1947 or 1948 Republic of China
- Spouse: Mary Lee
- Children: 2
- Education: University of Auckland (PhD); University of Hong Kong (MBBS, MD)
Sum Ping Lee
- Other names: Sum-ping Lee, SP Lee, Sum P Lee
- Scientific career
- Fields: Gastroenterology
- Institutions: University of Hong Kong; University of Washington; Queen Mary Hospital
- Thesis: The gallbladder epithelium in experimental cholelithiasis (1977)
- Doctoral advisor: Alistair Scott; John Scott
Sum Ping Lee
- Traditional Chinese: 李心平
- Simplified Chinese: 李心平
Transcriptions
Yue: Cantonese
- Yale Romanization: Léih Sām Pìhng
- Jyutping: Lei^{5} Sam^{1} Ping^{4}

Sum Ping Lee (Chinese: 李心平; Jyutping: Lei5 Sam1 Ping4, born 1947 or 1948) is a Chinese physician and gastroenterologist who served as the 39th Dean of the Li Ka Shing Faculty of Medicine at the University of Hong Kong, between 2008 and 2013. He is currently a Professor Emeritus at the Division of Gastroenterology, Department of Medicine, University of Washington School of Medicine.

== Early life and education ==
Lee was born in southern China. His mother took him and his sisters to Hong Kong when he was 9 years old. After taking the Joint Primary 6 Examination (the public examination at that time for all Primary 6 students in Hong Kong to enter secondary schools), Lee entered Diocesan Boys' School, where he became interested in poetry and literature. Aspiring to be a poet, in 1963 he enrolled in the arts stream for Form 6-7 (respectively equivalent to Year Twelve and Year Thirteen in England and Wales, Northern Ireland and New Zealand). However, his father's sudden passing from lung cancer prompted him to switch to medicine. He was already in Form 6, but then-headmaster Sydney James Lowcock approved the change. 2 years later he started his MBBS at the University of Hong Kong (HKU), graduating in 1970.

In 1973, after 3 years of medical practice, Lee went to New Zealand to pursue research, obtaining his PhD from the University of Auckland in 1978. He also received his MD from HKU in 1980.

== Career ==
Lee's career began at Queen Mary Hospital, where he worked for 3 years after receiving his MBBS in 1970. He then went to New Zealand to pursue a PhD.

After his PhD, Lee became a consultant in gastroenterology and stayed at different institutions in Auckland, Sydney, Melbourne, London and Boston. In 1985, he and his family moved to Seattle and joined the University of Washington School of Medicine. Eventually, he was appointed Cyrus E. Rubin Endowed Chair, and became the Head of the Division of Gastroenterology at the Department of Medicine in 1995. He also served as the Chief of the Gastroenterology Section of the Seattle VA Medical Center.

Lee returned to the University of Hong Kong in 2008, taking up the position of Dean of the Li Ka Shing Faculty of Medicine. The Faculty at that time was besieged by various issues, most notably the scandal of former Dean of Medicine Shiu-kum Lam. Lam was accused of fraud during his tenure as Dean of Medicine between 2001 and 2007. From 2003 to 2009, Lam defrauded HKU donors by making them pay HKD3.8 million to his private company, and transferred most of the amount to his personal account. He also deceived his patients at Queen Mary Hospital, asking them to pay their medical bills to his private company while using notes and receipts bearing letterheads of HKU and the hospital. Lam was sentenced to 25 months in jail in 2009, but was released after spending only 11 months behind bars. Lee was described as an "outsider" who could bring a "new climate" to the governance of the Faculty. The same year, he also joined the Board of the Hospital Authority in his new position.

In 2011, Lee was endowed with the Dexter H C Man Family Professorship in Medical Science.

Lee's deanship was marked by the launch of new departments and the incorporation of humanities into medical education and research. He led the founding of the Centre for the Humanities and Medicine in 2009 and the Centre for Medical Ethics and Law in 2012, and the introduction of medical humanities into HKU's undergraduate medical curriculum in 2012. The School of Chinese Medicine, School of Public Health and School of Nursing were established or reformed, and the Bachelor for Pharmacy programme was rolled out under his watch.

Towards the end of his tenure, Lee oversaw the establishment of 2 new hospitals affiliated with the Faculty of Medicine. In 2008, as Grace Wai-king Tang, the then-President of the Hong Kong Academy of Medicine, was having an end-of-term visit at China's Ministry of Health, she relayed Lee's request for a teaching hospital in Mainland China. HKU and the Shenzhen government formally went into an agreement in 2009. Initially named Binhai Hospital, it was renamed the University of Hong Kong-Shenzhen Hospital in 2010, and opened on 1 July 2012.

In 2013, Singapore-based Parkway Pantai and NWS Holdings, a Hong Kong company, partnered in a joint venture for a new private, for-profit hospital (now Gleneagles Hong Kong Hospital) in Hong Kong. The Faculty of Medicine was brought in as a clinical partner, responsible for clinical governance, appointment of doctors and healthcare staff training, while Parkway Pantai and NWS would manage the hospital. It would also be a teaching partner hospital of the Faculty.

Lee retired in August 2013, when his 5-year term as Dean ended, and left the Board of the Hospital Authority. He remains a Professor Emeritus at the Division of Gastroenterology, Department of Medicine, University of Washington School of Medicine.

== Honours and awards ==
- Fellow of the Royal Australasian College of Physicians
- Fellow of the American College of Physicians
- Fellow of the American College of Gastroenterology
- Distinguished Achievement Award, American Association for the Study of Liver Diseases (2010)
- Master of the American College of Gastroenterology (2010)

The Lee Sum Ping Medical Humanities Enrichment Award at the Li Ka Shing Faculty of Medicine, University of Hong Kong, is named after Lee.

== Personal life ==
Lee became interested in poetry and literature in secondary school. He kept composing poems and writing Chinese calligraphy after he turned to a medical career.

Academic offices
Preceded by Raymond Hin Suen Liang	Dean of Li Ka Shing Faculty of Medicine; 2008–2013	Succeeded by Gabriel Leung
