= Shelley Lee =

Hong Kong government official

Shelley Lee GBS OBE JP
- 李麗娟

Permanent Secretary for Home Affairs
- In office July 2002 – October 2005
- Secretary for Home Affairs: Patrick Ho
- Preceded by: Office created Lam Woon-kwong (as Secretary for Home Affairs)
- Succeeded by: Carrie Lam

Personal details
- Born: Lee Lai Kuen; June 30, 1949 (age 76) Hong Kong
- Spouse: John Lau Shek Yau (m. 1971; div. 2000)
- Education: Maryknoll Convent School
- Alma mater: University of Hong Kong (BA); Kennedy School of Government (MPA)

Shelley Lee Lai-kuen GBS OBE JP (Chinese: 李麗娟) is a former senior official in the Hong Kong Government. She was known as Shelley Lau with her full name Shelley Lau Lee Lai-kuen before she divorced in 2000. Lee retired in 2005 from the civil service as the permanent secretary for home affairs, after a distinguished 34-year career in public service. Lee has made exemplary contributions to the development of Hong Kong and is well respected for her compassion towards those in difficulties.

== Education ==
In 1971, Lee graduated from the University of Hong Kong where she studied English literature in the Arts Faculty. In 1985, Lee graduated from Harvard University Kennedy School of Government with a Master of Public Administration degree. Lee also completed the six-week Advanced Management Programme of the Harvard Business School in 2000.

In her earlier years, Lee attended the Maryknoll Convent School.

== Career ==
In 1971, Lee joined the Hong Kong Government as an executive officer and subsequently transferred to the Administrative Service in August 1972. She rose to the rank of administrative officer staff grade A1 in September 2004.

Lee was the first woman to take on the post of private secretary to the former governor Baron MacLehose.

During her 33 years of service in the Administrative Service, Lee has served in a number of senior positions including: deputy secretary-general, Office of Members of the Executive and Legislative Councils (September 1986 – August 1989); commissioner for recreation and culture (October 1989 – June 1991); secretary-general, Office of Members of the Executive and Legislative Councils (June 1991 – February 1993); deputy secretary for health and welfare (February 1993 – July 1995); and director of home affairs (August 1995 – June 2002). She became permanent secretary for home affairs in the principal officials shakeup of July 2002, retiring from civil service in October 2005.

Over the years, Lee has been active in promoting women's and children's rights and welfare within the Civil Service. During the SARS crisis, she set up the We Care Education Fund for children of the deceased alongside Carrie Lam, Fanny Law and Margaret Chan. She is a founding member and former chairman of the Association of Female Senior Government Officers formed in 1979, where she worked closely with other female senior civil servants, notably, Anson Chan, Elizabeth Wong and Katherine Fok Lo Shiu-ching, to successfully fight for equal remuneration terms for married women in the Civil Service. This was achieved in 1981. As a result of such achievements, Lee is considered to be an early member of the "Handbag Party".

Lee is known fondly to the public, particularly in the education, health and welfare sectors as the "Community Godmother" (Yue Chinese: 眾人媽打, or simply 媽打). This is in tribute to her warmth and sincere care and concern for the underprivileged, the orphaned and victims of catastrophes.

== Radio talk show ==
On 28 March 2012, Radio Television Hong Kong announced that Lee will co-host radio talk show 七百萬人的先鋒 with Allan Au (區家麟), interviewing "50 Successful Women in Hong Kong" including: Elsie Tu, Ann Hui, Elizabeth Wong, Rosanna Wong.

== Awards ==
In 2004, Lee received an honorary fellowship from the University of Hong Kong. In 2006, Lee received the Gold Bauhinia Star.

Government offices
Preceded by Lam Woon-kwong as Secretary for Home Affairs	Permanent Secretary for Home Affairs; 2002–2005	Succeeded by Stephen Frederick Fisher; Acting
Order of precedence
Preceded by Yu Kwok-chun; Recipients of the Gold Bauhinia Star	Hong Kong order of precedence Recipients of the Gold Bauhinia Star	Succeeded by Sophie Leung; Recipients of the Gold Bauhinia Star
