= Libby Lee =

Hong Kong physician

Libby Lee Ha-yun
- 李夏茵
- Born: 1971 or 1972 (age 54–55)
- Education: University of Hong Kong

Libby Lee Ha-yun (Chinese: 李夏茵, born 1971 or 1972), is currently the Deputy Director of Health Bureau of Hong Kong. She is scheduled to be appointed as the Chief Executive of the Hospital Authority on August 1, 2025, replacing the departing Tony Ko Pat-sing, formerly the Director of Strategic Development of the Hospital Authority.

== Summary ==
Lee attended Ying Wa Girls' School during her high school years. After graduating from Form 7 in 1991, she continued her studies at the Li Ka Shing Faculty of Medicine, The University of Hong Kong, and graduated in 1996. After graduating from university, she joined the Hospital Authority in the same year and worked in the internal medicine ward of Caritas Medical Centre.
