= Ko Wing-man =

Ko Wing-man GBS, JP
- 高永文
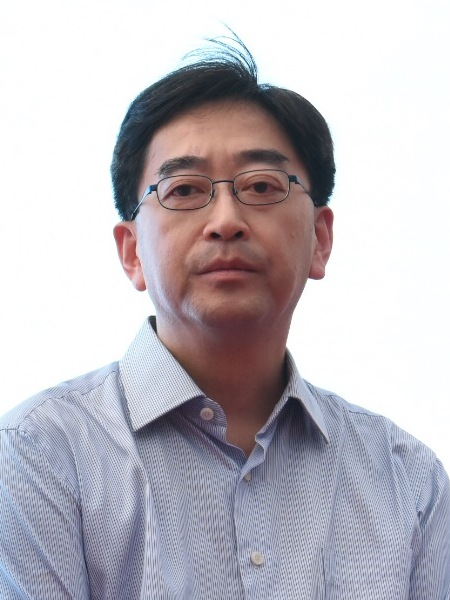
- Ko in 2019

Secretary for Food and Health
- In office 1 July 2012 – 30 June 2017
- Chief Executive: Leung Chun-ying
- Preceded by: York Chow
- Succeeded by: Sophia Chan

Personal details
- Born: June 16, 1957 (age 69) Hong Kong
- Education: University of Hong Kong (MBBS)

Ko Wing-man GBS, JP (Chinese: 高永文, born 1957) is a non-official member of the Executive Council of Hong Kong. He served as the Secretary for Food and Health of Hong Kong from 2012 to 2017. Besides being an orthopedic specialist, he is the member of The Medical Council of Hong Kong, the chairman of The Hong Kong Anti-Cancer Society, member of the Board of Hong Kong Baptist University, member of the Board of Hong Kong Red Cross, Board of Directors of the Chiu Sheung School Hong Kong, Consultant of the pro-Beijing New People's Party (Hong Kong), The New Voice Club of Hong Kong, Happy Charity For Public Foundation, Asia-Pacific Anti Additive Association, the President of the Hong Kong Medical & Health Association of China, the Chairman of the Strategic Development Committee, the Chairman of the Chinese Medicine Development Committee and the Standing Committee of the Chaozhou, GuangDong Committee of the Chinese People's Political Consultable Conference.

== Background ==
Ko graduated from Li Ka Shing Faculty of Medicine, University of Hong Kong in 1981. He began his career at Princess Margaret Hospital of Hong Kong then at the Hospital Authority. In 1992, Ko received his master's degree in Health Administration from the University of New South Wales. He served the position of Director of Professional Services & Public Affairs and Director of Professional Services and Human Resources during his time in the Hospital Authority. During the SARS outbreak in 2003, he served as the acting Chief Executive of the Hospital Authority when Ho Shiu-wei was infected with SARS. The medical system in Hong Kong was heavily criticised for having responded too slowly to the deadly disease. Following the LegCo investigation report on SARS, Ko resigned from the Hospital Authority, along with Chairman Edward Leong in 2004. In 2004, he began serving as Chairman of the Hong Kong Anti-Cancer Society, Director of the Hong Kong Red Cross and Chairman of their Health & Care Service Management Committee.

Ko joined reconstruction efforts after the 2008 Sichuan earthquake. In 2012, he was appointed Secretary for Food and Health.

In September 2022, Ko said that Hong Kong should not treat COVID-19 as a flu, and also said that the city should not relax anti-epidemic measures.

On 12 September 2022, SCMP reported that the government's COVID-19 Expert Advisory Panel, composed of six medical specialists, had several members who suggested gradually lifting COVID-19 restrictions (including removing hotel quarantine by November 2022), with Ko and Lo Chung-mau expressing their doubts about their suggestions and preferring a cautious approach. Ko also rejected Singapore's approach to COVID-19, calling it "lying flat," though daily caseloads in Singapore averaged between 1,000 and 3,000 per day, compared to around 10,000 per day in Hong Kong.

On 25 September 2022, after the government lifted mandatory hotel quarantine against Ko's earlier suggestion, Ko said the government made the decision based on data. Ko also said that lifting of quarantine "does not mean the government has opted to lie flat," and that the city "has never opted to live with the virus."

On 17 October 2022, Ko defended the government's decision to invalidate 20,000 vaccine exemption passes, and said it was for the public interest. However, the government's decision to invalidate the passes was earlier temporarily blocked by the High Court.

== Honours ==
In 1986, Ko received a fellowship from the Royal College of Surgeons of Edinburgh. He became a fellow of the Orthopaedic Surgery at Hong Kong Academy of Medicine in 1993 and a fellow of the Community Medicine in 2000. Ko received another fellowship of the Faculty of Public Health Medicine at Royal College of Physicians.

He was awarded the BBS in 2008.

Political offices
Preceded by York Chow	Secretary for Food and Health; 2012–2017	Succeeded by Sophia Chan
