= Yeoh Eng-kiong =

Hong Kong government official

Yeoh Eng-kiong OBE, GBS, JP
- 楊永強
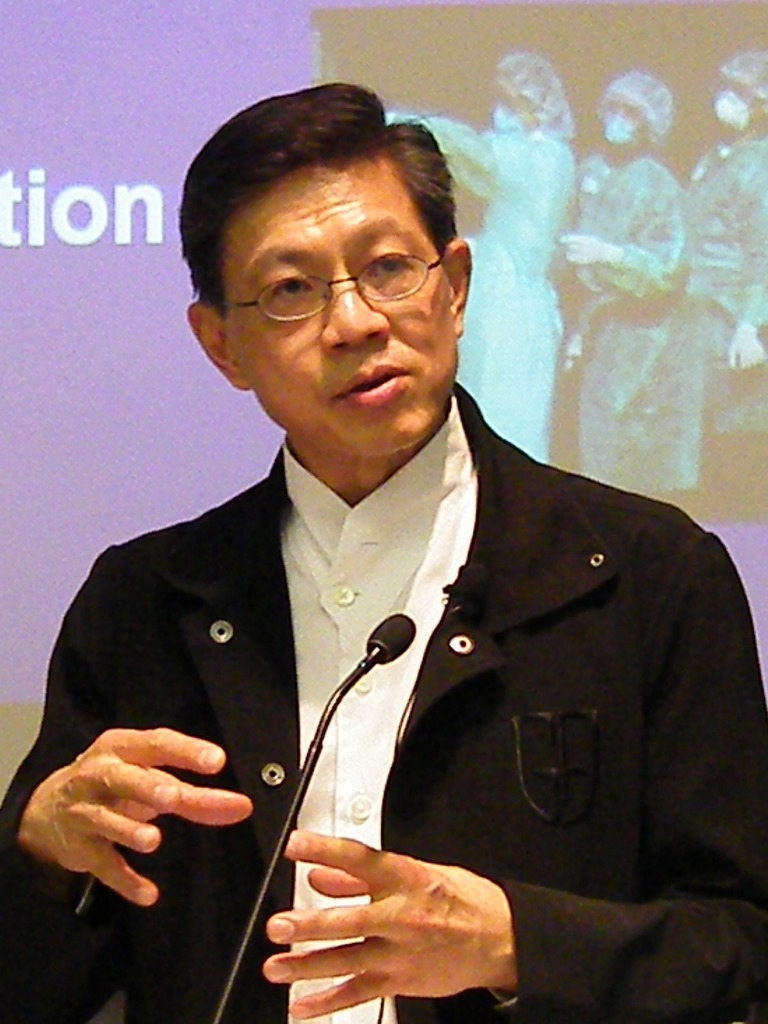

Secretary for Health, Welfare and Food
- In office 2002–2003
- Preceded by: Himself, as Secretary for Health and Welfare
- Succeeded by: York Chow

Secretary for Health and Welfare
- In office 1999–2002
- Preceded by: Katherine Fok
- Succeeded by: Himself

Personal details
- Born: April 16, 1946 (age 80) Ipoh, Malaysia
- Education: University of Hong Kong (MBBS)

Yeoh Eng Kiong OBE, GBS, JP (traditional Chinese: 楊永強; simplified Chinese: 杨永强; Pe̍h-ōe-jī: Iûⁿ Éng-kiông; pinyin: Yáng Yǒngqiáng; born 16 April 1946) was the Secretary for Health and Welfare between 1999 and 2002, Secretary for Health, Welfare and Food and a member of the Executive Council between 2002 and 2004 in the Hong Kong Government.

Yeoh's father was the late Yeoh Chin Hin, a Malaysian businessman who was a founder and director of Kuala Lumpur Kepong Berhad.

== Career ==
Yeoh studied medicine at Faculty of Medicine, the University of Hong Kong where he was elected President of the Student Union in 1969 and graduated in 1971. He specialised in gastroenterology. In 1979, he became a consultant physician at Queen Elizabeth Hospital.

After a 19-year career at Hong Kong government hospitals, with recognised work in AIDS research, Yeoh became the first Chief Executive of the newly formed Hospital Authority in 1990. In January 1999, he was appointed to the post of Secretary for Health and Welfare (a civil servant position). In 2002, he was appointed as the Secretary for Health, Welfare and Food under the new political appointee system.

Yeoh is currently a professor at The Jockey Club School of Public Health and Primary Care at the Chinese University of Hong Kong.

== SARS ==
Yeoh was heavily criticised by the media subsequently for his handling of the SARS outbreak in 2003. On 14 March 2003, despite the rising number of SARS cases in Hong Kong, Yeoh insisted there were no signs of a widespread outbreak of pneumonia - this was seen as misleading the public into not taking enough health care precautions. At a hearing at a LegCo select committee, he later explained that he had intended to distinguish the then unnamed disease from other forms of community-acquired pneumonia and to correct the Chinese-language media who had equated "atypical pneumonia" with SARS synonymously before the WHO officially named it. He apologised for the misunderstanding in his communications. He later admitted that he and the government had underestimated the severity of the pandemic and acted passively.

He was forced to resign on 8 July 2004 to take political responsibility over the SARS outbreak. Yeoh was succeeded by York Chow.

== Awards ==
In 2005, Yeoh was awarded a Gold Bauhinia Star and an Honorary Fellowship by the University of Hong Kong.

Political offices
Preceded by Katherine Fok	Secretary for Health and Welfare; 1999–2002	Succeeded by Himself as Secretary for Health, Welfare and Food
Preceded by Himself as Secretary for Health and Welfare	Secretary for Health, Welfare and Food; 2002–2004	Succeeded by York Chow
Preceded by Lily Yam as Secretary for Environment and Food	Secretary for Health, Welfare and Food; 2002–2004	Succeeded by York Chow
Order of precedence
Preceded by Ng Ching-fai; Recipients of the Gold Bauhinia Star	Hong Kong order of precedence Recipients of the Gold Bauhinia Star	Succeeded by Vincent Cheng; Recipients of the Gold Bauhinia Star
