= Sophia Chan =

Hong Kong academic (born 1958)

Sophia Chan Siu Chee GBS, JP, FAAN, FFPH, FRCN
- 陳肇始

Secretary for Food and Health
- In office 1 July 2017 – 30 June 2022
- Chief Executive: Carrie Lam
- Preceded by: Ko Wing-man
- Succeeded by: Lo Chung-mau (Secretary for Health)

Director, HKU Primary Health Care Academy, School of Public Health
- In office February 2023 – Present

Personal details
- Born: April 16, 1958 (age 68)
- Education: Master of Public Health, Harvard School of Public Health Doctor of Philosophy, The University of Hong Kong Master of Education (Primary Health Care), The University of Manchester Post-registration Diploma in Health Care Education (Nursing), The Hong Kong Polytechnic University Mental Health Nursing, Grant MacEwan Community College, Alberta, Canada Diploma in Nursing Administration, The Chinese University of Hong Kong Registered Sick Children Nurse (RSCN), The Charles West School of Nursing, The Hospital for Sick Children, Great Ormond Street, London, United Kingdom

Sophia Chan Siu Chee GBS JP (Chinese: 陳肇始; born 16 April 1958) is a Hong Kong academic, health policy leader, and former government official. She is currently a Professor at the School of Public Health, Li Ka Shing Faculty of Medicine, at the University of Hong Kong (HKU), and serves as Senior Advisor to the President’s Office at HKU. She is also Professor and Director of the HKU Primary Health Care Academy, and Head of the WHO Collaborating Centre for Health and Nursing Workforce Development in Primary Health Care. Chan is internationally recognized for her work in public health, tobacco control, and primary health care development.

== Biography ==
She was educated at the St. Paul's Secondary School. She subsequently graduated from the University of Manchester with a Master of Education, the Harvard University with a Master of Public Health and the University of Hong Kong with a Doctor of Philosophy Degree. She was a Professor in Nursing and Director of Research in HKU's School of Nursing and an Assistant Dean of the Li Ka Shing Faculty of Medicine of HKU.

She was involved in tobacco control and smoking cessation promotion and was a consultant to the World Health Organization on training health-care professionals in tobacco dependency treatment interventions through advocacy and education.

=== Political Career ===
In 2012, she was appointed as the Under Secretary for Food and Health. From 2017 to 2022, she was appointed Secretary for Food and Health of the administration of Carrie Lam.

Subsequently, in 2018 she declined to speak in support of banning bear-bile products, the production of which is considered inhumane and cruel, in Hong Kong.

In February 2021, Chan gave approval for emergency use of the Sinovac vaccine, and granted it an exemption from a rule that stated vaccines must have third phase clinical trial data published in a journal.

In April 2021, Chan briefed varies industries (catering, agriculture and fisheries, Chinese medicine, and health services) on why the NPCSC implemented rules to only allow "patriots" to serve in the government, and asked for their full support. In addition, she said that she fully supports the changes. In December 2021, Chan claimed that having only "patriots" serve in the government would help the global fight against COVID-19.

On 31 December 2021, Chan warned the public not to gather in large groups; hours later, she attended the Hong Kong Dental Association's annual ball, as the guest of honor.

In March 2022, Chan said that a COVID-19 lockdown in Hong Kong had not been ruled out, contradicting an earlier statement by Carrie Lam, who said that a lockdown would not happen. The contradiction caused rumors and panic-buying at grocery stores and pharmacies. Chan also said that traditional Chinese medicine could prevent Covid-19.

In November 2022, Chan said that the government was not underprepared for the city's fifth wave, and when asked if the administration should apologize to relatives of those who died, Chan said it was time for people to move on.

Political offices
Preceded by Gabriel Leung	Under Secretary for Food and Health; 2012–2017	Succeeded by Chui Tak-yi
Preceded by Ko Wing-man	Secretary for Food and Health; 2017–2022	Succeeded by Lo Chung-mau (Secretary for Health)
