= York Chow =

Hong Kong politician (born 1947)

York Chow Yat-ngok
- 周一嶽
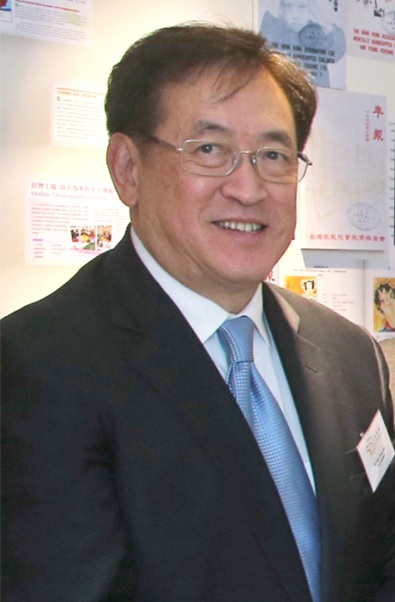

Chairman of the Equal Opportunities Commission
- In office 1 April 2013 – 31 March 2016
- Preceded by: Lam Woon-kwong
- Succeeded by: Alfred Chan

Secretary for Food and Health
- In office 1 July 2007 – 30 June 2012
- Chief Executive: Sir Donald Tsang
- Chief Secretary: Henry Tang
- Undersecretary: Gabriel Leung
- Permanent Secretary: Marion Lai & Sandra Lee
- Political Assistant: Paul Chan
- Preceded by: Himself (as Secretary for Health, Welfare and Food)
- Succeeded by: Ko Wing-man

Secretary for Health, Welfare and Food
- In office October 2004 – 30 June 2007
- Preceded by: Yeoh Eng-kiong
- Succeeded by: Himself (as Secretary for Food and Health)

Personal details
- Born: 1947 (age 78–79) British Hong Kong
- Education: University of Hong Kong (MBBS)

York Chow Yat-ngok (traditional Chinese: 周一嶽; simplified Chinese: 周一岳; pinyin: Zhōu Yīyuè; born 1947, Hong Kong), GBS, SBS, MBE, is the former Secretary for Food and Health of Hong Kong and a member of the Executive Council. He was appointed as Secretary for Health, Welfare and Food in 2004. The position has since been renamed to Secretary for Food and Health from reshuffling in 2007.

== Early life ==
During his studies in the University of Hong Kong since 1967, he stayed in St. John's College and has served as the male sports captain in the academic years 1968–1969.

== Career ==
Chow is an orthopaedic surgeon by profession. He was appointed Hospital Chief Executive of Queen Mary Hospital in 2001. Chow was appointed a vice-president of the International Paralympic Committee in 1997.

== Controversies ==
=== 2011 June protest ===
On 25 June 2011, a small protest was held by about ten mothers begging on the street for the attention of Chow regarding the mainland Chinese mothers birth tourism issues with hospital capacities. These are families that have a mainland mother and a Hong Kong father. Chow did sympathise with these couples, but nothing was done after the protest. The issue later expanded to the Early 2012 Hong Kong protests which was also triggered by Kong Qingdong's comment.

Political offices
Preceded by Yeoh Eng-kiong	Secretary for Health, Welfare and Food; 2004–2007	Succeeded by Himself as Secretary for Food and Health
Preceded by Yeoh Eng-kiong	Secretary for Health, Welfare and Food; 2004–2007	Succeeded by Matthew Cheung as Secretary for Labour and Welfare
Preceded by Himself as Secretary for Health, Welfare and Food	Secretary for Food and Health; 2007–2012	Succeeded by Ko Wing-man
Preceded by Lam Woon-kwong	Chairman of the Equal Opportunities Commission; 2013–2016	Succeeded by Alfred Chan
Order of precedence
Preceded by Ambrose Lee; Recipients of the Gold Bauhinia Star	Hong Kong order of precedence Recipients of the Gold Bauhinia Star	Succeeded by Michael Stuart-Moore; Recipients of the Gold Bauhinia Star
