= Lo Chung-mau =

Hong Kong physician (born 1961)

The Honourable Lo Chung-mau BBS JP
- 盧寵茂
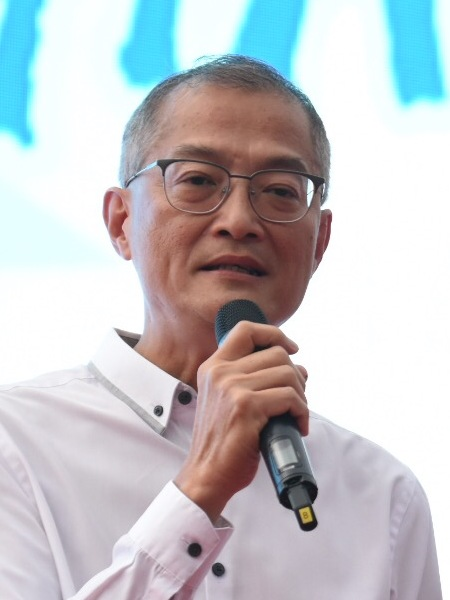
- Lo in 2019

1st Secretary for Health
- Incumbent
- Assumed office 1 July 2022
- Chief Executive: John Lee
- Preceded by: Sophia Chan (as Secretary for Food and Health)

Personal details
- Born: 7 August 1961 (age 65) Portuguese Macau
- Education: University of Hong Kong
- Occupation: Former Hospital Chief Executive of University of Hong Kong–Shenzhen Hospital

Lo Chung-mau
- Traditional Chinese: 盧寵茂
- Simplified Chinese: 卢宠茂
Transcriptions
Standard Mandarin
- Hanyu Pinyin: Lú Chǒngmào
Yue: Cantonese
- Jyutping: lou4 cung2 mau6

Lo Chung-mau (Chinese: 盧寵茂, born 7 August 1961) is a specialist in liver transplant and is currently the Secretary of Health of the Government of Hong Kong. Before joining the government, he was Chief Executive at the University of Hong Kong–Shenzhen Hospital, and chair of Hepatobiliary Surgery at the University of Hong Kong.

== Early life and education ==
Born in Macau in 1961, Lo Chung-mau moved to and studied in Hong Kong, graduating from Queen's College in 1980. Lo entered the Faculty of Medicine of the University of Hong Kong soon afterwards, obtaining the degree in 1985. He specialised in liver transplantation under "Master of Liver Transplantation" Fan Sheung-tat.

== Career ==
Lo became chair of Hepatobiliary Surgery at the university and Director of Liver Transplantation Centre at Queen Mary Hospital. He was also head of Department of Surgery of the university.

As a member of the selection committee, he heavily denounced the new vice-chancellor Peter Mathieson in 2013 for "insulting" the university and China for his "ignorance" and "inability" without any understanding over Hong Kong, China, and Asia, nor proficiency in Chinese.

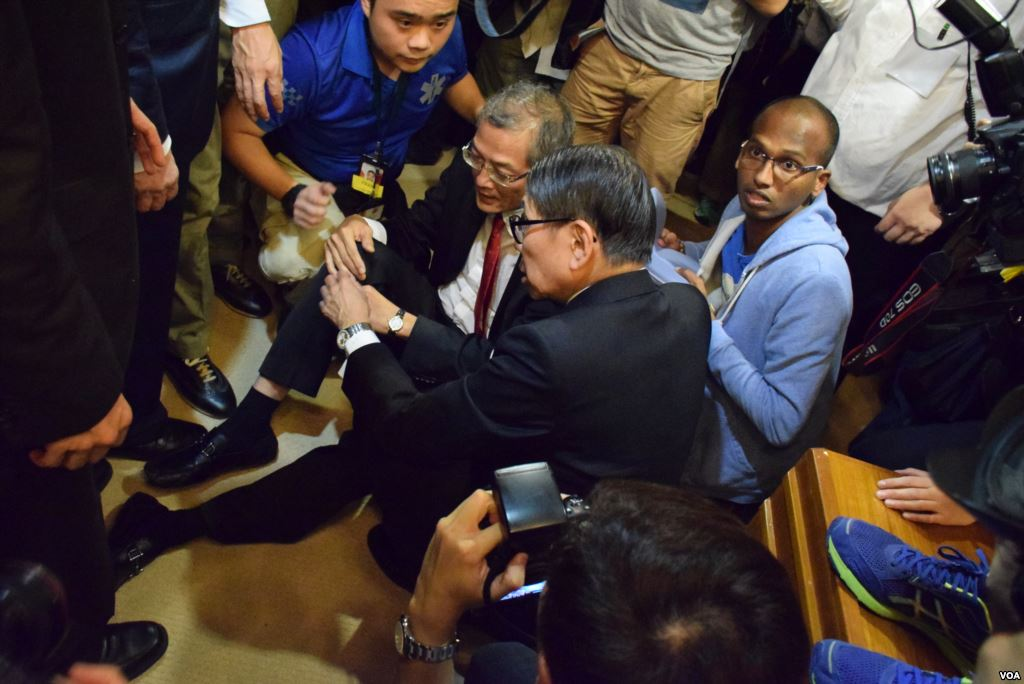
Lo Chung-mau (centre) fell down amidst chaos

By 2015 Lo was appointed to the council of the university. During the pro-vice-chancellor selection controversy, Lo was best known for his fall after students, angered by the reported interference from the government to reject democrats-backed Johannes Chan, stormed the meeting room. Lo, hospitalised, branded the protesters "lawless" "Red Guards", but was accused of a "dive" after giving out different accounts of his injury. According to leaked recordings of a meeting that voted down Chan's appointment, Lo criticised Chan's academic level, adding that Chan did not send him a sympathetic message after his fall.

Lo staunchly opposed the Umbrella Movement of 2014, calling the occupying protests "cancerous", causing serious disruptions to the daily lives.

In November 2016, he was appointed Hospital Chief Executive at the University of Hong Kong–Shenzhen Hospital, serving until 2022 when he was appointed by the new Chief Executive John Lee as the inaugural Secretary for Health.

== Secretary of Health ==
=== COVID-19 ===
Lo said, in February 2022, that living with COVID would be "going to hell together". In May 2022, he said that living with COVID would result in "we will all die together."

In July 2022, Lo confirmed that Hong Kong would continue to adhere to China's zero-Covid policy. He also rejected calls for quarantine-free travel and rejected living with COVID-19. Lo also said it would be unreasonable to have a fully-open border with mainland China or the rest of the world. Lo also said that other countries' COVID-19 policies could not be used for Hong Kong, stating "Many government policies cannot solely rely on foreign theories and practices. We also have to consider Hong Kong's situation including age, population, vaccination rates, and the capacity of the healthcare system."

On 10 July 2022, Lo announced on a television show that government authorities hoped to implement real-name registration to the LeaveHomeSafe app as soon as possible; 4 days later, Sun Dong said there were no plans for his department to implement the changes.

On 3 August 2022, Lo said that despite quarantine, the border was "open" with mainland China, stating "Many people say we have half-given up, or given up, opening up the border with the mainland. I have to emphasise that we would not give up. The border is always open, and the question is how we can improve the quota and quarantine measures." In contrast, John Lee said that the administration has been trying to "open the border normally" with mainland China.

On 13 August 2022, Lo admitted that the previously-mandated seven days of hotel quarantine had failed to meet the government's expectations and came at a high cost.

On 26 August 2022, Lo suggested that the government may introduce further restrictions in response to COVID-19, stating "I hope the public will stay cautious ... and minimise large-scale gatherings ... otherwise, the government may have no choice but to tighten other social-distancing measures." Lo also said that further opening up of the city currently was "not a realistic option at this point". Lo also rejected Western-style COVID-19 policies, and also rejected "lying flat" as a response to COVID-19.

On 27 August 2022, Lo suggested that private hospitals were slacking and could be punished for not taking in non-COVID patients from public hospitals due to potential overcrowding at public hospitals, though Dr. Siddharth Sridhar of HKU said that the overcrowding was because elderly patients with COVID-19 were often sent to public hospitals even if the severity of their symptoms was low. Months later in November 2022, Lau Ka-hin of the Hospital Authority said that public hospitals would be allowed to have COVID-19 positive patients with low symptoms to isolate at home instead of being treated at the hospital. Lau said that 60% of accident and emergency patients were taken in solely because of their COVID-19 positive result.

On 4 September 2022, days after Bloomberg published an article claiming that John Lee preferred to cancel hotel quarantine before November 2022 while others such as Lo disagreed, Lo criticized media as misleading and compared it to "Chinese palace dramas". On the same day, the city reported 10,683 positive cases, with 193 of them, or less than 2%, coming from imported cases.

On 9 September 2022, Lo stressed that reducing quarantine and reopening to the world must be "based on data," with the government reporting that 154 of 10,076 new infections that day were imported, representing about 1.5% of all reported cases. According to Centre for Health Protection, inbound travelers accounted for only 1.2% of confirmed cases in the previous month.

On 12 September 2022, SCMP reported that the government's Covid-19 Expert Advisory Panel, composed of six medical specialists, had several members who suggested gradually lifting COVID-19 restrictions (including removing hotel quarantine by November 2022), with Lo and Ko Wing-man expressing their doubts about their suggestions and preferring a cautious approach.

During a press conference on 13 September 2022, Chief Executive John Lee warned against comparing the flu against COVID-19, claiming that COVID-19 was 6 times more deadly than the flu, and stating that the situation was still "critical." A day later, medical experts disagreed with Lee's data and estimated COVID-19's fatality rate at 0.098%, lower than the 0.1% recorded for the flu. Dr. Joseph Tsang Kay-yan also mentioned that the death rate of 0.098% could be even lower in reality, due to citizens not reporting their infections, plus an accounting difference, where people who die with COVID-19 are counted as a COVID-19 death, even if the underlying cause of death was not due to COVID-19. On 15 September 2022, Lo supported Lee's assertion that COVID-19 was 6 times more deadly than the flu, and accused the experts of misleading the public and using faulty reasoning. A day later on 16 September 2022, former chief executive of the Hospital Authority, Leung Pak-yin, hinted that "someone" was preventing Hong Kong from returning to normalcy and preventing international travel to Hong Kong. On 19 September 2022, the medical experts published their research, showing that the fatality rate was indeed 0.097% when using data from June 2022 onwards.

On 25 September 2022, Lo said that the "0+0" policy of no quarantine and no self monitoring was not appropriate for the city, and said the reason was that people flying in were 3x more likely to be infected than local residents. On the same day, imported cases represented 117 of 3,897 confirmed cases, or about 3% of confirmed cases. Lo warned that moving to "0+0" could result in 10x more imported cases and would burden the healthcare system. Asked about his previous comment which criticized "living with Covid," Lo said that his intent was to have the public keep fighting the virus. Lo also said that Hong Kong was not "lying flat" when fighting Covid, and that Hong Kong had not strayed away from the "dynamic-zero" Covid strategy. Lo said that the Hong Kong government was the "chief engineer" in the fight against the pandemic, but said the government could not provide "a road map to resume normality" and that creating a timeline would be "not easy" due to the possibility of new variants. Lo said "There are also a number of new virus variants overseas" and cited the BA.2.75 variant.

On 29 September 2022, Lo emphasized that Hong Kong's anti-epidemic policy was based on the dominant need to protect mainland China, stating "This is our obligation: to make sure that we won't cause a major outbreak in the rest of China," and that the city could not follow other countries in anti-epidemic measures, saying "I don't think Hong Kong can just look at the international thing and follow the rest of the world. I have to consider the other thing. Our motherland is like our family."

On 5 October 2022, legislative council member Doreen Kong criticized the government and Lo for invalidating 20,000 COVID-19 vaccine exemption passes, stating that he had no legal authority to do so, with Kong asking "Who is destroying the rule of law now?" On 7 October 2022, Kwok Cheuk-kin filed a judicial review to the High Court, challenging Lo's decision to invalidate the vaccine exemption passes. On 11 October 2022, the High Court temporary stopped Lo's invalidation of the vaccine exemption passes. On 21 October 2022, the High Court ruled in Kwok's favor against Lo, ruling that Lo and the government has no power to invalidate vaccine exemption passes. After losing the case, the government set to change the law to give them the legal authority to invalidate the vaccine exemption passes. After the law was changed to give Lo the power to invalidate passes, Lo dismissed accusations that the government wanted to override the judiciary process, saying "It's not whether the government wins or someone else wins. We have to make sure all citizens win in this battle against Covid." On 27 October 2022, Kwok filed another judicial review, stating that the new law violated the Basic Law since there was no appeal mechanism for people who have their vaccine passes invalidated.

On 6 October 2022, the Trail Runners Association of Hong Kong requested an urgent meeting with Lo, asking why trail running was subject to stricter restrictions than other activities, saying current policies had "inconsistent, illogical, unfair restrictions" and "This undermines the credibility of Hong Kong's decision-making process on these issues, not only locally, but also globally."

On 21 October 2022, Lo said that it was not the right time to remove the mask mandate, saying that the vaccination rates of elderly and children were not satisfactory, but did not provide clear answers on what vaccination rates would warrant the removal of the mask mandate.

On 29 October 2022, when asked about why Hong Kong could has not moved from the "0+3" policy to "0+0," Lo said that there was still a need to monitor sub-variants.

On 10 November 2022, Lo said COVID is still a "public health emergency" in Hong Kong, and criticized political groups and health experts that asked for further relaxations of pandemic restrictions.

On 11 November 2022, Regina Ip said of the government's changing of restrictions "I think they're very complicated, it took me a long time to read your press release, really, regular residents also find they're very complicated."

On 13 November 2022, Lo said it is still "not the time" to eliminate inbound travel restrictions.

In December 2022, after mainland China reduced some pandemic restrictions, Lo was repeatedly asked when Hong Kong would reduce restrictions; Lo said that the city would not "hastily" follow China, and that the elderly vaccination rate was "still not ideal." On quarantine-free travel between Hong Kong and mainland China, Lo said it was "not a topic of discussion right now."

On 9 December 2022, Lo said that the mandatory use of the LeaveHomeSafe app to enter some businesses would remain, along with mandatory vaccination. On 11 December 2022, Lo said that there was no plan to stop using the LeaveHomeSafe app, saying "LeaveHomeSafe used to play an essential role in fighting the epidemic to record the confirmed cases and prevent infection." Two days later on 13 December 2022, it was announced that LeaveHomeSafe QR codes could be removed from venues and people will no longer have to check in with the app. On 28 December 2022, the government announced that the vaccine pass would no longer be required, making the LeaveHomeSafe app no longer mandatory. On 8 January 2023, the LeaveHomeSafe system was officially shut down by the government.

On 24 December 2022, Lo blamed media and misinformation on low vaccine uptake in children and seniors, saying "Unfortunately, there is a lot of misinformation in the media and in the community about the adverse effects of vaccines, a lot of anti-science." On 28 December 2022, John Lee said that the vaccination rate was relatively high.

On 29 December 2022, Lo said that the government's move to drop the vaccine pass and other restrictions were not sudden, but planned, and that the healthcare system was now capable of handling outbreaks of Covid.

On 31 December 2022, Lo said that the government hopes to have inbound arrivals from mainland China have mandatory vaccination like other overseas arrivals, but did not give details on plans, and said "We will be monitoring the situation and consider how we would adjust the vaccination requirement for these inbound passengers." Lo said that Hong Kong's healthcare facilities would not be burdened with the border reopening, despite the mainland going through a wave of infections.

On 20 January 2023, after the government announced that those positive with Covid-19 would not have to isolate or report their infections to the government, Lo denied that the government was giving up its fight against the virus.

On 23 January 2023, Lo said that he hoped more restrictions would be lifted, and said "But I must emphasise... we are not giving up on fighting the pandemic." A news report said that in January 2023, Hong Kong had the highest death rate per capita in the world.

In February 2023, Lo agreed that there should be no independent investigation into the government's handling of the pandemic, and said "We have constantly reviewed, improved and adjusted our policies, just like what other countries have done."

In February 2023, Lo said that once the mask mandate is dropped in Hong Kong, masks will still be mandatory in hospitals and nursing homes, and claimed "We should not forget that the masks have helped us a lot during the pandemic."

In May 2023, Lo said that the government had spent HK$1.67 billion on quarantine facilities.

=== Xi Jinping ===
In August 2022, Lo held a meeting to discuss Chinese leader and CCP general secretary Xi Jinping's "important speech" given on 1 July 2022, stating "Xi Jinping's important speech reflects in full his care, attention and support for the Hong Kong SAR as well as the country's staunch and firm commitment to the full and faithful implementation of the principle of "one country, two systems". It is of great significance and meaning." Lo also asked coworkers in the Department of Health to "grasp the core essence of Xi's speech and build it into their own work".

=== Chinese medicine ===
In August 2022, Lo said that the government would put more resources into developing Chinese medicine, and claimed Chinese medicine is an integral part of the health care system in Hong Kong. Lo said that "Chinese medicine has been involved in the whole process of pandemic prevention, treatment, and rehabilitation."

=== Public hospitals ===
On 29 October 2022, Lo said that the government may implement a minimum period of time in which healthcare professionals must work at a public hospital before they can leave. This caused an uproar among healthcare professionals, according to the president of the Hong Kong Public Doctors' Association.

=== Cigarettes and tobacco ===
In November 2022, it was reported that Lo was considering a lifetime ban of tobacco products to anyone born after 2009. On 8 November 2022, Lo confirmed the discussions, and also said the authorities may raise the tobacco tax.

Lawmaker Shiu Ka-fai criticized the decision, saying that government was already planning minors' lives, that it would reduce freedom of choice, and potentially stop talent from coming to Hong Kong.

=== Primary Healthcare Blueprint ===
In 2023, the Health Bureau released the "Primary Healthcare Blueprint," with Lo commenting in the preface. An opinion article published in SCMP said that the blueprint was flawed, and that "Perhaps the most deep-seated concern is that, despite the lip service given to serving community needs, the blueprint seems to have all over it the fingerprints of the tiny elite group of 'family physicians' who have for decades insisted they should provide the foundations for Hong Kong’s primary care sector."

=== Foreign doctors ===
In March 2023, Lo said that a government plan to attract 100 doctors trained abroad to move to Hong Kong had only resulted in 10 doctors willing to come, and said "That is, to some extent, due to emigration, as well as many reasons such as the social and political environment." In September 2023, Henry Fan said of the plan: "Regrettably, we have not been able to hire people with high professional achievements, as they have already established their careers overseas."

Lo also mentioned that in the past three years, 1,247 full-time doctors had left their jobs, with only 191 of them retiring, and the remainder due to other reasons.

=== Organ donations ===
In May 2023, when asked whether Hong Kong organ donors could specify that their organs only be used in Hong Kong and not in mainland China, Lo declined and said that donations should carry no conflict or prejudice.

== Personal life ==
Lo owns a residential property in the United Kingdom with his wife, along with three properties in Hong Kong.

Lo is a voting member of the Hong Kong Jockey Club.

In September 2022, he got his fourth shot of the Sinovac COVID-19 vaccine.

In December 2022, Lo underwent home quarantine, after a member of his family tested COVID-19 positive.
