= Food and Health Bureau =

Hong Kong policy bureau (2007–2022)

- 食物及衞生局
- Emblem of the Hong Kong SAR

Agency overview
- Formed: 2007
- Preceding agency: Health, Welfare and Food Bureau
- Dissolved: 2022
- Superseding agencies: Health Bureau; Environment and Ecology Bureau
- Headquarters: 18/F, East Wing, Central Government Offices, 2 Tim Mei Avenue, Tamar, Hong Kong
- Ministers responsible: Professor Sophia Chan, Secretary for Food and Health; Dr Chui Tak-yi, Under Secretary for Food and Health
- Agency executives: Elizabeth Tse, Permanent Secretary for Food and Health (Health); Philip Yung, Permanent Secretary for Food and Health (Food)
- Child agencies: Agriculture, Fisheries and Conservation Department; Department of Health; Food and Environmental Hygiene Department; Government Laboratory
- Website: www.fhb.gov.hk

Food and Health Bureau
- Traditional Chinese: 食物及衞生局
- Simplified Chinese: 食物及卫生局
Transcriptions
Standard Mandarin
- Hanyu Pinyin: Shíwù jí Wèishēng Jú
Yue: Cantonese
- Yale Romanization: Sihk maht kahp waih sāng guhk
- Jyutping: Sik6 mat6 kap6 wai6 sang1 guk6

The Food and Health Bureau (FHB) was a policy bureau of the Government of Hong Kong from 2007 to 2022 that managed food hygiene, environmental hygiene and health policies in Hong Kong. It was led by the Secretary for Food and Health (SFH) during its existence.

Established in 2007 as one of the superseding agencies of the former Health, Welfare and Food Bureau, the FHB became defunct as of 1 July 2022, its responsibilities being split among the Environment and Ecology Bureau and the Health Bureau.

== History ==
Prior to the transfer of sovereignty in 1997 it was named Health and Welfare Branch.

When the Principal Officials Accountability System (POAS) was introduced in July 2002, the name of the Bureau was renamed from Health and Welfare Bureau to the name of Health, Welfare and Food Bureau, with the Food and Environmental Hygiene Department being transferred from the now abolished Environment and Food Bureau.

In July 2007, the bureau was further renamed Food and Health Bureau, with its functions on welfare transferred to the Labour and Welfare Bureau.

As part of the government bureaux restructuring initiated by incoming Chief Executive John Lee, the Food and Health Bureau was abolished on 1 July 2022. The Health Bureau is the direct successor agency of the former Food and Health Bureau, taking over the remaining policy portfolios after those on environmental hygiene, food safety, agriculture and fisheries, and veterinary public health were transferred to the Environment and Ecology Bureau.

== Portfolio ==
The bureau oversees policies on environmental hygiene, food safety, agriculture and fisheries, food markets, animal welfare, burial, reduction of salt and sugar in food, primary healthcare and disease prevention, Chinese medicine, regulatory regime, research and health data, health advisory and appeals, and planning for manpower, professional development and health infrastructure.

The Department of Health, Food and Environmental Hygiene Department, Agriculture, Fisheries and Conservation Department, and the Government Laboratory report to the Bureau.

The Secretary for Food and Health also oversees the operation of the Hospital Authority, a statutory body of Hong Kong which is responsible for managing Hong Kong's public hospitals' services.

== See also ==
- Health in Hong Kong
