= Personal Emergency Link =

Healthcare service in Hong Kong

The Personal Emergency Link Service (PE Link; Chinese: 一線通平安鐘) was established by the Senior Citizen Home Safety Association to launch a 24-hour personal emergency link to help the needy in Hong Kong.

== Background ==
Amidst an unforeseen extended cold wave in February 1996, more than a hundred unattended elderly who lived alone died. In response, the Association were dedicated to render emergency relief and total care service to all elderly and chronic invalids by setting up the PE Link. PE Link was created in 1996.
