= Health Info World =

Health organization in Hong Kong

Health Info World, established in January 1999, is the health promotion and publicity section of the Hong Kong Hospital Authority. Charity donations from fundraising events are the main sources to support the ongoing health programs.

The HKHA understands the importance of health education, and thus has been organizing a series of programs in order to spread professional health knowledge to different age groups. The organization focuses on arousing health awareness in Hong Kong by holding talks and activities.

It also sets up free health tests to the community and assists Hong Kong citizens with how to adjust their daily habits in order to improve their health condition. Despite all kinds of outdoor health promotions, the Health Info World also assists patients who need extra care. Furthermore, the Health Info World offers volunteer positions to the elderly, which could build up their confidence by contributing in the society.
