= Secretary for Health =

Position in the Hong Kong Government

Hong Kong Special Administrative Region Secretary for Health 醫務衞生局局長
- Emblem of Hong Kong

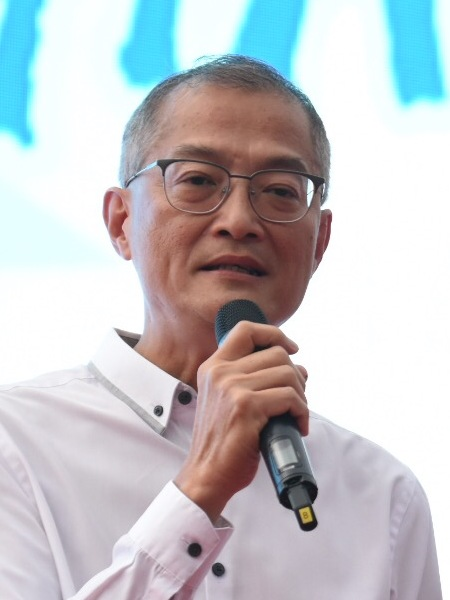
- Incumbent; Lo Chung-mau since 1 July 2022
- Health Bureau
- Style: The Honourable
- Appointer: Central People's Government nomination by Chief Executive
- Inaugural holder: Katherine Fok; Secretary for Health and Welfare; York Chow; Secretary for Food and Health; Lo Chung-mau; Secretary for Health
- Formation: 1 July 1997; 1 July 2007; 1 July 2022
- Salary: HK$4,021,200 per annum
- Website: Health Bureau

Secretary for Health
- Traditional Chinese: 醫務衞生局局長
Transcriptions
Yue: Cantonese
- Yale Romanization: Sihk maht kahp waih sāang guhk guhk jéung
- Jyutping: Sik^{6} mat^{6} kap^{6} wai^{6} saang^{1} guk^{6} guk^{6} zoeng^{2}

The Secretary for Health (Chinese: 醫務衞生局局長) is a ministerial position in the Hong Kong Government, who heads the Health Bureau. The current office holder is Lo Chung-mau.

The position was created on 1 July 2022, following the reshuffle of the principal officials and reorganisation of the policy bureaux of the Hong Kong Government. It replaced the previous Secretary for Food and Health, and the portfolio with foods transferred to the Secretary for Environment and Ecology.

Before that, the Secretary for Health, Welfare and Food (衞生福利及食物局局長) was created as a ministerial position who headed the Health, Welfare and Food Bureau (HWFB). It was replaced by Secretary for Food and Health on 1 July 2007, following the reshuffle of the principal officials and reorganisation of the policy bureaux of the Hong Kong Government. It replaced the previous Secretary for Health, Welfare and Food, and the portfolio with welfare transferred to the Secretary for Labour and Welfare.

The SH is a politically appointed position. In other words, its term expires when the Chief Executive leaves office. The secretary is also a member of the Executive Council (ExCo).

== List of office holders ==
Political party: Nonpartisan

=== Secretaries for Social Services, 1973–1983 ===
No.	Portrait	Name	Term of office		Governor	Ref
1		Li Fook-kow 李福逑	1973	1977	Sir Murray MacLehose (1971–1982)	
1		Eric Peter Ho 何鴻鑾	12 April 1977	6 February 1983	Sir Murray MacLehose (1971–1982)	
1		Eric Peter Ho 何鴻鑾	12 April 1977	6 February 1983	Sir Edward Youde (1971–1982)	

=== Secretaries for Health and Welfare, 1983–1997 ===
No.	Portrait	Name	Term of office		Governor	Ref
1		Henry Ching 程慶禮	2 May 1983	30 November 1984	Sir Edward Youde (1982–1986)	
2		John Walter Chambers 湛保庶	1 December 1984	30 September 1988	Sir Edward Youde (1982–1986)	
2		John Walter Chambers 湛保庶	1 December 1984	30 September 1988	Sir David Wilson (1987–1992)	
3		Chau Tak-hay 周德熙	1 October 1988	January 1990	Sir David Wilson (1987–1992)	
4		Elizabeth Wong 黃錢其濂	January 1990	September 1994	Sir David Wilson (1987–1992)	
4		Elizabeth Wong 黃錢其濂	January 1990	September 1994	Chris Patten (1992–1997)	
5		Katherine Fok 霍羅兆貞	September 1994	30 June 1997	Chris Patten (1992–1997)	

=== Secretaries for Health and Welfare, 1997–2002 ===
No.	Portrait	Name	Term of office		Duration	Chief Executive	Term	Ref
1		Katherine Fok Lo Shiu-ching 霍羅兆貞	1 July 1997	19 September 1999	2 years, 80 days	Tung Chee-hwa (1997–2005)	1	
2		Yeoh Eng-kiong 楊永強	20 September 1999	30 June 2002	2 years, 283 days	Tung Chee-hwa (1997–2005)	1	

=== Secretaries for Health, Welfare and Food, 2002–2007 ===
No.	Portrait	Name	Term of office		Duration	Chief Executive	Term	Ref
1		Yeoh Eng-kiong 楊永強	1 July 2002	11 October 2004	2 years, 102 days	Tung Chee-hwa (1997–2005)	2	
2		York Chow Yat-ngok 周一嶽	12 October 2004	30 June 2007	2 years, 261 days	Tung Chee-hwa (1997–2005)	2	
2		York Chow Yat-ngok 周一嶽	12 October 2004	30 June 2007	2 years, 261 days	Donald Tsang (2005–2012)	2	

=== Secretaries for Food and Health, 2007–2022 ===
No.	Portrait	Name	Term of office		Duration	Chief Executive	Term	Ref
1		York Chow Yat-ngok 周一嶽	1 July 2007	30 June 2012	5 years, 0 days	Donald Tsang (2005–2012)	3	
2		Ko Wing-man 高永文	1 July 2012	30 June 2017	5 years, 0 days	Leung Chun-ying (2012–2017)	4	
3		Sophia Chan Siu-chee 陳肇始	1 July 2017	30 June 2022	5 years, 0 days	Carrie Lam (2017–2022)	5	

=== Secretaries for Health, 2022–present ===
No.	Portrait	Name	Term of office		Duration	Chief Executive	Term	Ref
1		Lo Chung-mau 盧寵茂	1 July 2022	Incumbent	4 years, 68 days	John Lee (2022–present)	6	

== See also ==
- Hong Kong Government
- Government departments and agencies in Hong Kong
