= Hong Kong Society of Medical Informatics =

Former professional medical society

The Hong Kong Society of Medical Informatics was founded in April 1987 by a group of medical practitioners and informatics professionals with special interests in medical informatics and computing and communications.

The society is a non-profit organization registered as a Company Limited by Guarantee.

== See also ==
- Health informatics
- Hospital Authority
