= Katherine Fok =

Hong Kong government official

Katherine Fok Lo Shiu-ching GBS (Chinese: 霍羅兆貞; née Lo; born 12 December 1941) is a former Hong Kong government official. She was Secretary for Health and Welfare from 1994 to 1999.

Fok was born in 1941 in Hong Kong and was graduated from the University of Hong Kong in 1962 and joined the Hong Kong government as an Administrative Officer in September of the same year. She had served in various positions in the government including Labour Department, Social Welfare Department, the former Councils Branch, the former General Duties Branch, Home Affairs Department and Urban Services Department.

She had also served as Secretary-General for the Office of the Unofficial Members of the Executive and Legislative Councils and the Standing Committee on Civil Service Salaries and Conditions of Service. From 1983 to 1987, she was seconded to the Independent Commission Against Corruption where she served as Director of the Community Relations Department. She was promoted to Commissioner for Labour from 1992 to 1994. She became Secretary for Health and Welfare from 1994 to 1999. She retired from the government in 1999.

Government offices
Preceded by Darwin Chen	Commissioner for Labour; 1992–1994	Succeeded by Stephen Ip
Preceded by Elizabeth Wong	Secretary for Health and Welfare; 1994–1999	Succeeded by Yeoh Eng-kiong
