= Health Bureau (Hong Kong) =

Department of the Hong Kong Government

- 醫務衞生局

Agency overview
- Formed: 2022
- Jurisdiction: Government of Hong Kong
- Headquarters: 19/F, East Wing, Central Government Offices, 2 Tim Mei Avenue, Tamar, Hong Kong
- Agency executives: Lo Chung-mau, Secretary; Libby Lee, Under Secretary; Thomas Chan, Permanent Secretary; Pending, Political Assistant
- Parent department: Chief Secretary for Administration
- Website: Official Website

The Health Bureau (Chinese: 醫務衞生局) is a policy bureau of the Government of Hong Kong. They are responsible for the health portfolios. The agency was established on 1 July 2022. The current (since 1 July 2022) Secretary for Health is Professor Lo Chung-mau.

This bureau was newly established under the re-organization of policy bureaux proposed by Carrie Lam, the fifth Chief Executive of Hong Kong, and was adopted by John Lee, the succeeding Chief Executive after Carrie Lam. On 19 June 2022, the Central People's Government announced the appointment of Professor Lo Chung-mau, previously the Head of University of Hong Kong-Shenzhen Hospital, as the first Secretary for Health.

Due to the restructuring, portfolios such as environmental hygiene, food safety, public health on agriculture and fisheries previously belonged to Food and Health Bureau are assigned to the Environment and Ecology Bureau, leaving Health Bureau remaining the health portfolio to be in-charge.

== Subordinate departments ==
There is only one department under the Health Bureau:

- Department of Health

== Related agencies ==
=== Centre for Health Protection ===
The CHP was created in 2003 in response to the SARS outbreak and copies the function of the CDC in the United States.

Before the introduction CHP reports to the Director of Health.

== History ==
In September 2022, SCMP reported that cruise line Royal Caribbean International abandoned its plans for a "cruise to nowhere" as the company did not receive a reply from the Health Bureau about approval for a month.

In October 2022, the Health Bureau was reported to be in discussions with the Hong Kong Monetary Authority to finalize details for the Global Financial Leaders' Investment Summit in November 2022, where the Health Bureau was discussing an option for COVID-19 positive guests to leave Hong Kong if leaving on private jets, but would not be allowed to leave on commercial airlines. SCMP confirmed that the Health Bureau has permitted guests to the Summit to leave by private jet or yacht if testing positive, and would also exempt guests from the "amber code" in their first 3 days of landing in Hong Kong.

In May 2023, after some Hongkongers expressed reluctance to have organ donations go to mainland China, the Health Bureau said "Some individuals also wantonly vilify the constructive significance of the proposed establishment of a standing mutual assistance mechanism for transplant by the two places, undoubtedly despising the inseparable ties between citizens of Hong Kong and the Mainland."
