= Immunisation Programme in Hong Kong =

In order to protect infants and children from serious infectious diseases, the Department of Health of Hong Kong provides a free comprehensive childhood immunisation programme to Hongkongers over all the Maternal & Child Health Centres. For primary 1 and primary 6 students, Department of Health dispatches immunisation teams to schools for the required vaccinations.

Age	Childhood Immunization Programme
Newborn	BCG, a vaccine for tuberculosis Hepatitis B vaccine---first dose
1 month	Hepatitis B vaccine---second dose
2–4 months	DTaP-IPV, a combined vaccine of DTaP and IPV (inactivated polio vaccine) for diphtheria, pertussis, tetanus and polio---first dose Pneumococcal Vaccine - first dose
3–5 months	DTaP-IPV---second dose Pneumococcal Vaccine - second dose
6 months	Hepatitis B vaccine---third dose DTaP-IPV---third dose Pneumococcal Vaccine - third dose
12 months	MMR vaccine, a vaccine against measles, mumps and rubella---first dose Varicella vaccine, a vaccine against chickenpox---first dose Pneumococcal Vaccine - booster dose
18 months	DTaP-IPV---booster dose
6 years (Primary 1)	MMRV vaccine--- a combined MMR and varicella vaccine given in one jab---second dose DTaP-IPV---booster dose
10-11 years (Primary 5)	HPV vaccine--- first dose (female only)
11–12 years (Primary 6)	dTap-IPV (reduced dose)---booster dose HPV vaccine--- second dose (female only)
