= University of Hong Kong–Shenzhen Hospital =

University of Hong Kong– Shenzhen Hospital 香港大学深圳医院
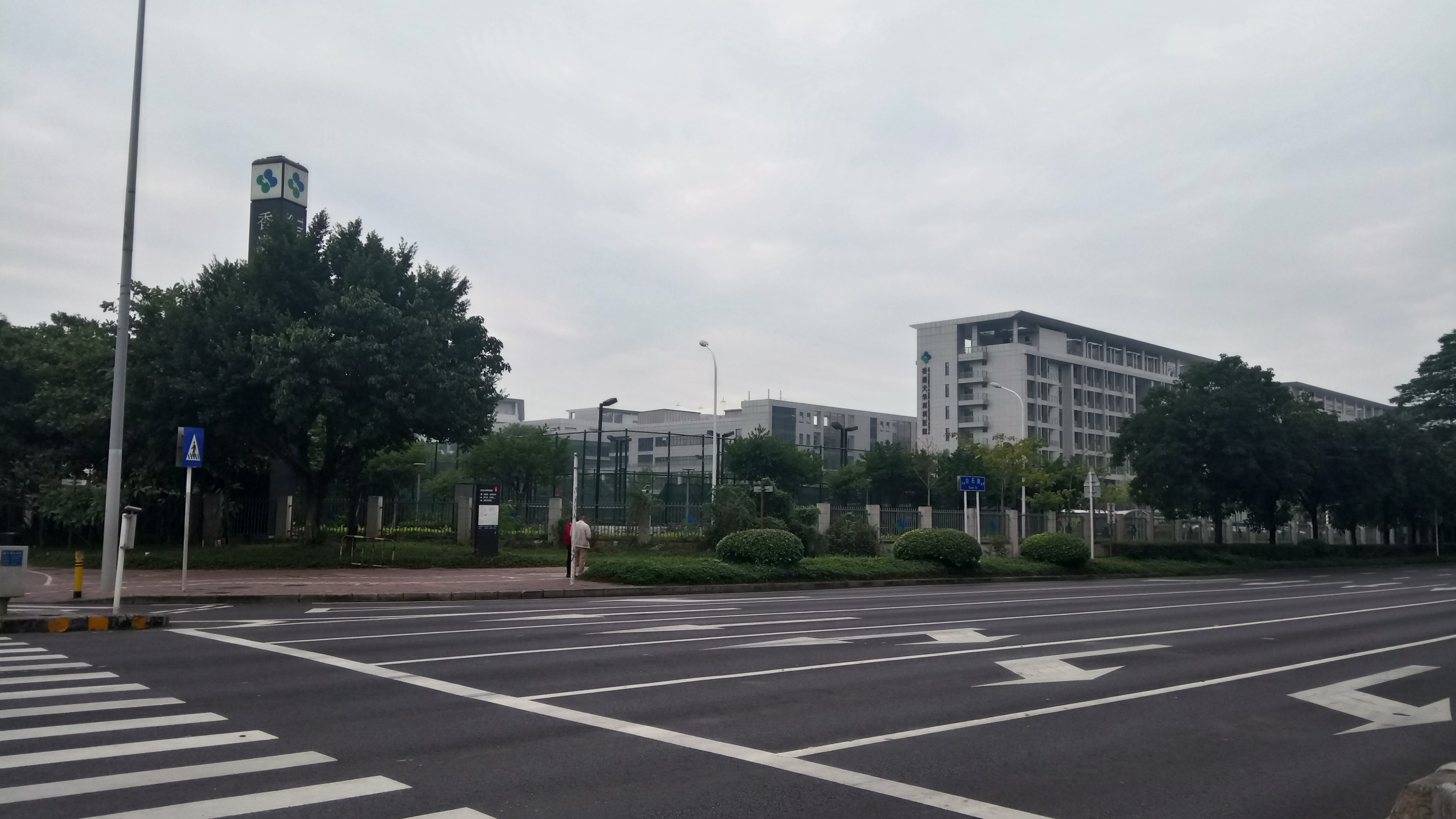

- Location within Guangdong

Geography
- Location: Shenzhen, Guangdong, China
- Coordinates: 22°32′N 113°59′E

Organisation
- Care system: Public
- Type: District General, Teaching
- Affiliated university: University of Hong Kong

Services
- Emergency department: Yes, Major Trauma Centre
- Beds: 2000

History
- Founded: 2012

Links
- Website: www.hku-szh.org
- Lists: Hospitals in China

Chinese name
- Simplified Chinese: 香港大学深圳医院
- Traditional Chinese: 香港大學深圳醫院
Transcriptions
Standard Mandarin
- Hanyu Pinyin: Xiānggǎng Dàxué Shēnzhèn Yīyuàn
Yue: Cantonese
- Jyutping: hoeng1 gong2 daai6 hok6 sam1 zan3 ji1 jyun6*2

The University of Hong Kong–Shenzhen Hospital (HKU-SZH; Chinese: 香港大学深圳医院) is a teaching hospital of the University of Hong Kong in Futian, Shenzhen, Guangdong, China.

The 2000-bed hospital is one of the two teaching hospitals of the University of Hong Kong. The Shenzhen municipal government constructed and provided funding for the facility.

== History ==
University of Hong Kong–Shenzhen Hospital was opened in 2012. Its first head was Grace Tang Wai-king. (Note: traditional Chinese: 鄧惠瓊; simplified Chinese: 邓慧琼; Jyutping: dang6 wai6 king4; pinyin: Dèng Huìqióng) The Shenzhen municipal government spent 4 billion yuan (about $624 million U.S. dollars) constructing the hospital. The Shenzhen Daily described it as the first "Hong Kong-style public hospital" in that city, and that residents "have shown great enthusiasm in" the hospital's introduction.

The hospital did not accept hongbao (red packets filled with cash) from patients in exchange for preferential service to them, and has been more conservative in giving out medications and intravenous therapy. For these reasons some patients had filed complaints against the style of healthcare given at HKU-SZH. The Chinese government had fully subsidized HKU-SZH, but the hospital operated at heavy financial losses despite that. By 2014 HKU and the Shenzhen government were disputing which party should cover the 200 million Hong Kong dollar advance for clinical management and supervision. In 2014 the hospital received some subsidies, and at that time it began operating without a loss. By 2015 there had been steady increases in the numbers of patients. In 2015 the head of the governing council of HKU stated that HKU-SZH is expected to repay the HK$200M advance by 2023.

On 14 November 2016 Professor Lo Chung-mau was scheduled to become the head of HKU-SZH, replacing Grace Tang. He is a liver transplant expert, member of the HKU university council, and the head of surgery of HKU. In October 2016 Lo stated that there will be a new pricing policy. According to The Standard "[i]t is believed" that Lo is intended to establish an organ transplant programme at HKU-SZH.

== Transportation ==
=== Metro ===
- Line 1: Get off at Qiaocheng East Station (Exit C1), then walk about 10 minutes.
- Line 9: Get off at Shenzhen Bay Park Station (Exit D1), then walk about 5 minutes.

=== Bus ===
- Express Bus 60: Longgang Central City → The University of Hong Kong–Shenzhen Hospital
- M561: Qiaocheng East Metro Station → The University of Hong Kong–Shenzhen Hospital
- B706: Shennan–Xiangmi Interchange → The University of Hong Kong–Shenzhen Hospital
- M487: Hongshuwan Metro Station → The University of Hong Kong–Shenzhen Hospital
- B729: Baishizhou East → The University of Hong Kong–Shenzhen Hospital
