= Gleneagles Hospital Hong Kong =

- GHK Hospital Limited
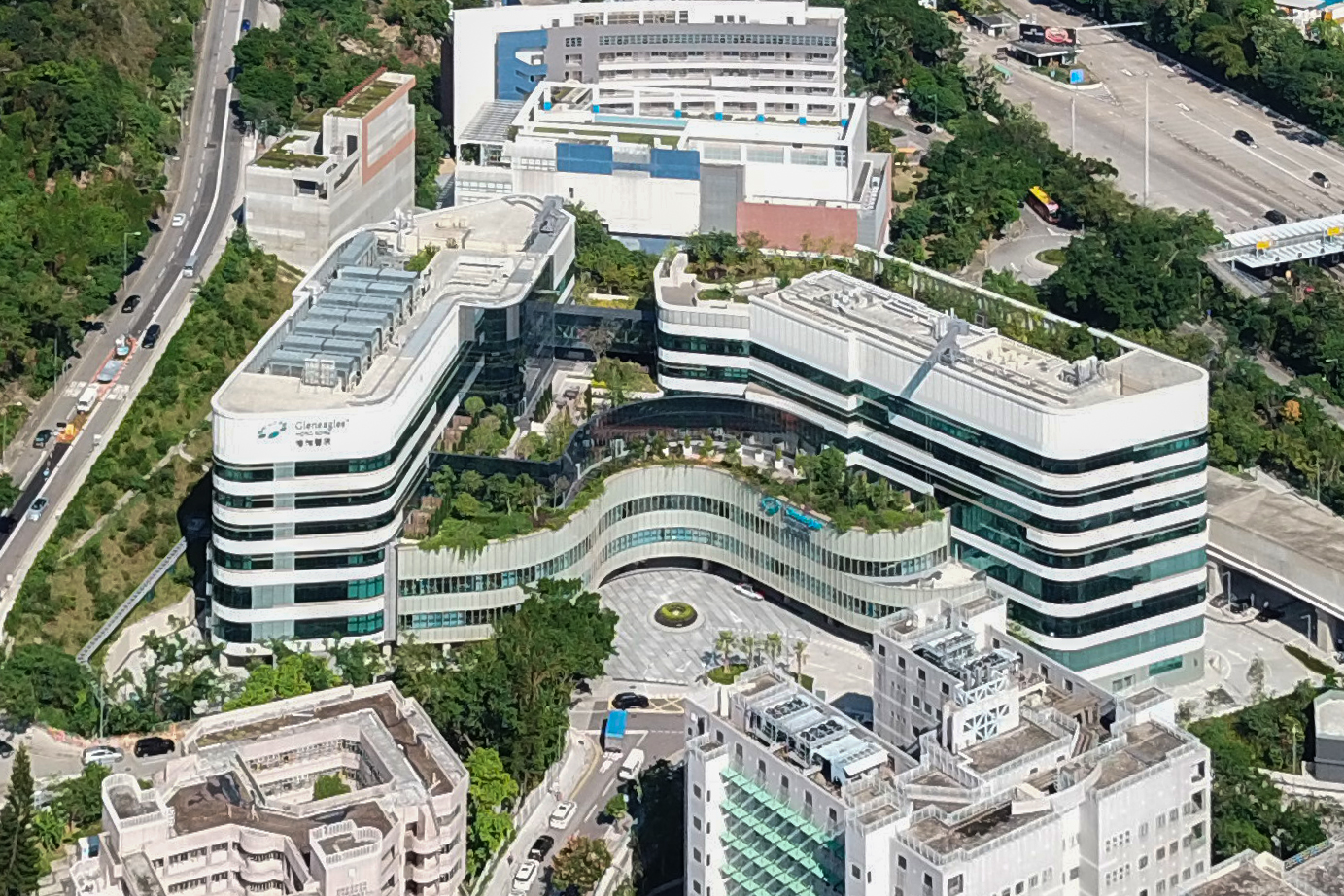
- Gleneagles Hospital Hong Kong in November 2018

- Location within Hong Kong

Geography
- Location: 1 Nam Fung Path, Wong Chuk Hang, Southern District, Hong Kong
- Coordinates: 22°15′07″N 114°10′36″E

Organisation
- Type: District General, Teaching
- Affiliated university: Li Ka Shing Faculty of Medicine, University of Hong Kong

Services
- Emergency department: Yes, Accident and Emergency
- Beds: 500

History
- Founded: 21 March 2017; 9 years ago

Links
- Lists: Hospitals in Hong Kong

Gleneagles Hospital Hong Kong
- Traditional Chinese: 港怡醫院
Transcriptions
Yue: Cantonese
- Yale Romanization: Góng yìh yī yún
- Jyutping: Gong2 ji4 ji1 jyun2

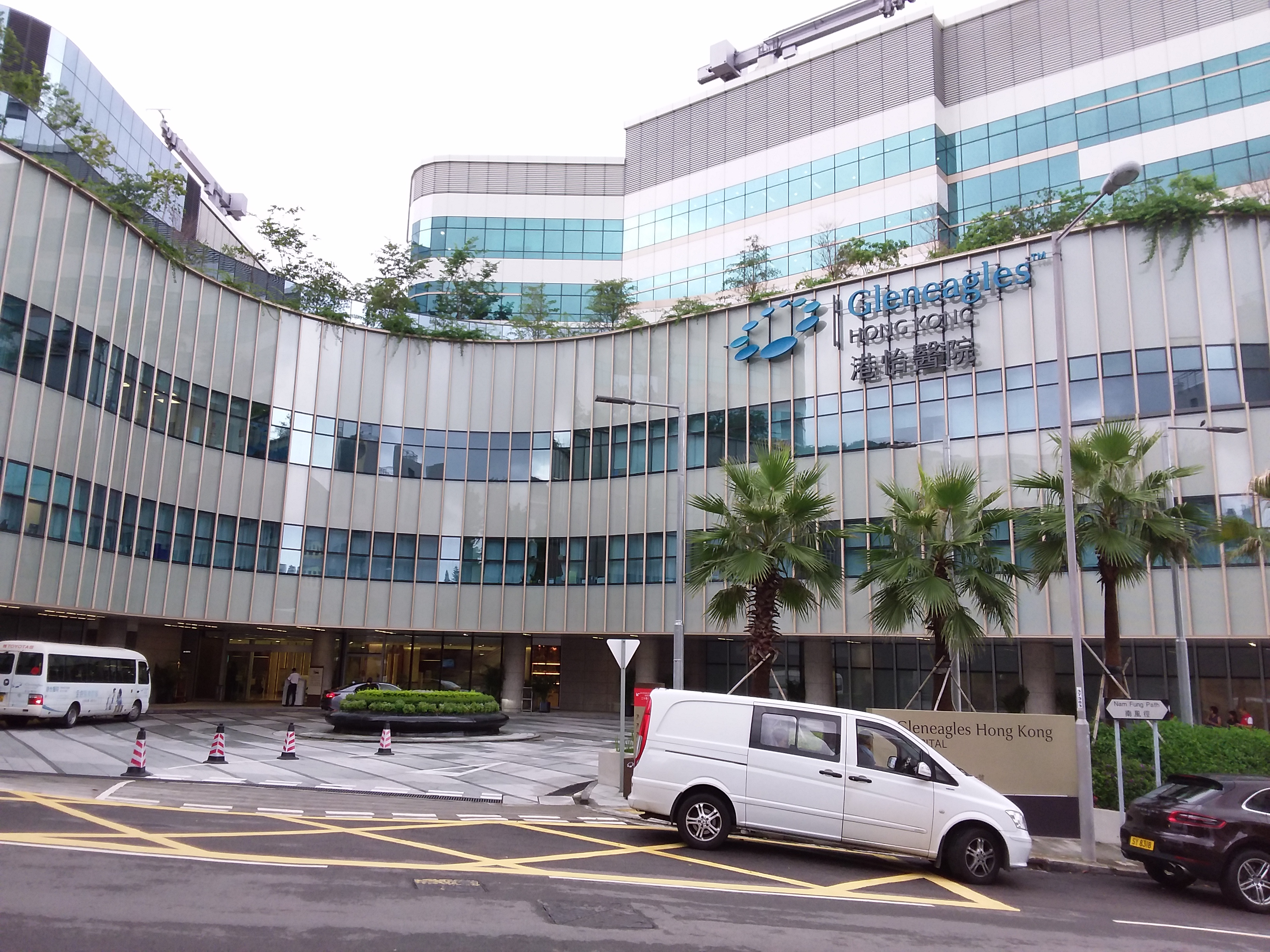
Gleneagles Hong Kong Hospital in Southern District, Hong Kong in August 2018.

Gleneagles Hospital Hong Kong (formerly Gleneagles Hong Kong Hospital) is a private multi-specialty district general hospital in Wong Chuk Hang, Hong Kong. The 500-bed hospital is a joint venture between Singapore-based Parkway Pantai and Hong Kong-listed NWS Holdings, with The University of Hong Kong being the hospital’s exclusive clinical partner. The hospital opened on 21 March 2017. Gleneagles is also a full-scale teaching hospital, offering clinical training to medical students of HKU Medical Faculty.

== Background ==
Gleneagles Hospital Hong Kong is built on the site of the former Nam Fung temporary housing area in Wong Chuk Hang. The area was cleared in 1994.

In 2009, the Hong Kong government invited local and overseas organisations to submit expressions of interest for the development of private hospitals at four sites. Wong Chuk Hang was the most popular site with 12 organisations showing interest. One of the tendering terms required that 30 per cent of services must be provided at standard package prices.

The site eventually was awarded to GHK Hospital Limited for HK$1.69 billion in 2013. Parkway Pantai and NWS Holdings contributed 60 and 40 per cent respectively of the total investment cost of approximately HK$5 billion.

Gleneagles opened its first satellite medical clinic, Gleneagles Medical Clinic Central, Hong Kong, on 1 March 2019, providing a range of services including general and specialist outpatient consultation, health screening services, vaccination etc. The Clinic was expanded and relocated to New World Centre in Central in October 2020 to accommodate continuous growth in demand. It offers services of diverse specialties covering Cardiology, Family Medicine, Gastroenterology and Hepatology, General Surgery, Geriatric Medicine, Ophthalmology, Orthopaedics, Otorhinolaryngology, Paediatrics, Respiratory Medicine and more.

== Management ==
Gleneagles Hospital Hong Kong is a joint venture between Singapore-based Parkway Pantai and Hong Kong-listed NWS Holdings. The University of Hong Kong is the exclusive clinical partner of Gleneagles and is responsible for clinical governance.

The hospital is managed by Parkway Pantai, one of Asia’s largest integrated private healthcare groups. For over 40 years, its Mount Elizabeth, Gleneagles, Pantai and Parkway brands have established themselves as the region’s best known brands in private healthcare. It is part of IHH Healthcare Berhad, the world’s second largest healthcare group by market capitalisation. IHH operates more than 15,000 licensed beds across 80 hospitals in 10 countries worldwide.

== Facilities and Services ==
The hospital's clinical services span across more than 35 specialties and subspecialties. Its facilities and services include:

- 24 hours emergency department
- Cardiology / Cardiac Catheterisation Laboratory
- Cardiothoracic surgery
- Chemotherapy Centre
- Clinical Laboratory
- Critical Care Unit
- Dietetic Services
- Endoscopy Centre
- Neonatal Intensive Care Unit & Special Baby Care Unit
- Operating Theatres
- Pharmacy Services
- Radiotherapy & Oncology Services
- Radiology Services
- Rehabilitation Services
- Renal Dialysis
- Sample Collection Centre

Specialist Outpatient Clinics

- Behavioural Health
- Breast
- Cardiology
- Chinese Medicine
- Family Medicine
- General Medicine
- General Surgery
- Haematology & Oncology
- Health Screening
- Neurology & Neurosurgery
- Obstetrics & Gynaecology
- Ophthalmology / Eye
- Orthopaedic Surgery
- Otorhinolaryngology / Ear, Nose & Throat
- Paediatrics
- Skin & Laser
- Urology
