= Department of Health (Hong Kong) =

Hong Kong government department

- 衞生署

Agency overview
- Headquarters: 21/F, Wu Chung House, 213 Queen's Road East Wan Chai Hong Kong Island
- Employees: 4,669
- Annual budget: HK$$5.3012 billion (2012–13)
- Agency executive: Dr. Ronald Lam Man Kin, Director of Health
- Parent agency: Health Bureau
- Website: www.dh.gov.hk

Department of Health
- Traditional Chinese: 衞生署
- Simplified Chinese: 卫生署
Transcriptions
Standard Mandarin
- Hanyu Pinyin: Wèi Shēng Shǔ
Yue: Cantonese
- Yale Romanization: Waih sāang chyúh
- Jyutping: Wai6 saang1 cyu5

Hong Kong's Department of Health is responsible for healthcare policies and the provision of basic healthcare services and established in 1939. The public hospitals are managed by the department's Hospital Authority. The department reports to the Health Bureau.

The department is headed by the Director of Health, a position currently held by Dr. Ronald Lam Man Kin.

== History ==
In the past, health and medical issues (including hospital management) fell under the purview of the Medical and Health Department. This changed with reforms to Hong Kong's healthcare system in the late 1980s. In October 1987, Governor David Wilson officially announced the government's intention to establish a new, semi-independent Hospital Authority, which would be administered by a new Hospital Services Department (HSD). In April 1989, the Medical and Health Department was split into the Department of Health and the Hospital Services Department. The Hospital Authority was set up in 1990.

In March 2021, the Department of Health terminated a vaccination agreement with a private clinic, after its doctor claimed that the Sinovac vaccine had a bad reputation and that he would not take it himself.

On 1 November 2022, Chief Executive John Lee said that Financial Secretary Paul Chan would have to take a PCR test upon arrival in Hong Kong, and will have to isolate if he tests positive; Lee stressed that Chan would not be allowed any exemptions. The Department of Health, in a press release issued at 11:57 p.m. on 1 November 2022, said Chan was a "recovered case and was not contagious, and isolation was not required," but did not specify if Chan tested negative on his PCR test. The press release also stated that Chan will attend the Global Financial Leaders' Investment Summit but "will not take part in meals," and did not specify the reason behind that if he had "recovered." On 2 November 2022, SCMP reported that Chan tested positive with his PCR test, but did not have to isolate, contradicting Lee's earlier remarks.

== Structure ==
The Department of Health provides its broad range and diverse services to Hongkongers through different divisions, offices, and centres. The following is a list of them:

Centre for Health Protection
Child Assessment Service
Chinese Medicine
Clinical Genetic Service
Dental Service
Elderly Health Service
Family Health Service
Forensic Pathology Service
Medical Device Control Office
Methadone Clinics
Office for Registration of Healthcare Institutions
Pharmaceutical Service
Port Health
Professional Development and Quality Assurance
Radiation Health Unit
Registration of Health Professionals
Student Health Service
Tobacco Control Office

== Drug registration in Hong Kong ==
Under the Pharmacy and Poisons Ordinance (Chapter 138), the Department of Health's Drug Office is responsible for drug registration in Hong Kong. All drugs sold in Hong Kong are required to be registered with a number, which consists of the prefix 'HK' followed by five digits (e.g. HK-05628).

== See also ==
- Immunisation Programme in Hong Kong
- Hong Kong Society of Medical Informatics
- Health Bureau (Hong Kong)
