= Leung government =

2012–2017 administration of Hong Kong

Leung Chun-ying Government
- 4th Government of the Hong Kong; Special Administrative Region

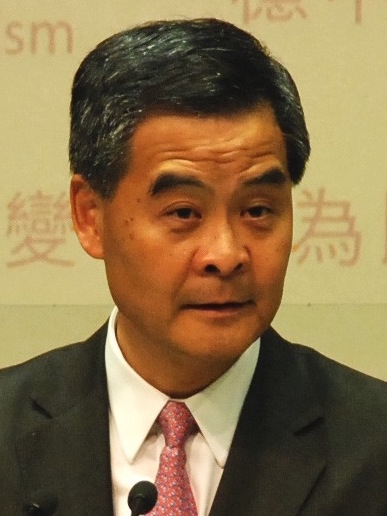
- Date formed: 1 July 2012
- Date dissolved: 30 June 2017

People and organisations
- CCP General Secretary (Note: The top position held by Hu Jintao and Xi Jinping is General Secretary of the Chinese Communist Party, thus the officeholders hold ultimate power and authority over party and state.): Hu Jintao (until 2012); Xi Jinping (since 2012)
- Head of government: Leung Chun-ying
- Premier of China: Wen Jiabao (until 2013); Li Keqiang (since 2013)
- No. of ministers: 15 (until 2015); 16 (since 2015)
- Member parties: DAB, FTU, BPA, NPP, LP
- Status in legislature: Pro-Beijing majority
- Opposition party: Pan-democracy camp

History
- Election: 2012 Chief Executive election
- Legislature terms: 4th Legislative Council; 5th Legislative Council; 6th Legislative Council
- Predecessor: Second Tsang government
- Successor: Lam government

The administration of Leung Chun-ying as Chief Executive of Hong Kong, officially referred to as "The 4th term Chief Executive of Hong Kong" relates to the period of governance of Hong Kong since the transfer of sovereignty over Hong Kong, between 1 July 2012 and 30 June 2017.

== Election ==
During the Hong Kong Chief Executive election, 2012, CY Leung secured a majority of the 1,132 votes cast by Election Committee members. Leung received 689 votes in all. His opponents Henry Tang and Albert Ho received 285 and 76 votes respectively. Thus, Leung was declared duly elected by the Returning Officer. After the election result was endorsed by the Central Government of the PRC, Leung took office on 1 July 2012, for a term of five years.

=== Mandate ===
Upon their elections, Tung Chee-hwa and Donald Tsang enjoyed popularity ratings of 80 percent and 70 percent respectively. Commentators have widely suggested that by comparison, Leung's very low approval rating of 17.8 percent by participants in the mock election and a less than overwhelming 57 percent support from the Election Committee members means he lacks the mandate from the people. The Standard cited one source who suggested the fact that the active involvement of the central government liaison office in the election may deter some people from joining Leung's team. Furthermore, pundits have commented Leung's lack of support within the business community may mean Leung may have difficulty recruiting suitable and capable talent for his cabinet.

== Legacy issues ==
In addition to general livelihood issues, specific issues inherited by Leung from the previous administration include:

- Pregnant mainland women seeking to give birth in Hong Kong, specifically to benefit from the right of abode. Seeking to assert his authority, Leung's first public announcement on the policy as Chief Executive-elect was to impose a 'zero' quota on mainland mothers giving birth in Hong Kong. Leung further underlined that those who did may not be able to secure the right of abode for their offspring in Hong Kong.
- Illegal structures, particularly on village houses and latent confrontation with the Heung Yee Kuk.
- The future of solid waste disposal, specifically the proposal to construct a waste incinerator on Shek Kwu Chau, after Edward Yau, Environment secretary for the 2nd Tsang administration, failed to secure the support of Panel members to file its funding request to the relevant LegCo committee in April 2012.
- As part of Hong Kong's democratic development, the Leung administration is tasked with paving the way for election, in 2017, of the Chief Executive by universal suffrage.
- The Tsang administration resurrected plans for a "national education" that had been originally shelved until 2015. It announced in April 2012 that Moral and National Education would be introduced as a curriculum subject in both primary and secondary schools in September of the same year, becoming compulsory in primary schools in September 2015 and in secondary schools in 2016.

== Transitional team ==
Fanny Law, who was Leung's campaign manager, was appointed as head of the office of the CE-elect. Leung earlier appointed Cathy Hung as his PR officer and Allen Fung as project officer.

Leung's fourth appointment to his transitional office, of 27-year-old Chen Ran (陳冉) as his project officer, stirred criticism. Chen is a former general secretary of the pro-CPC Hong Kong Y.Elites Association (香港菁英會), of which Leung is the patron. She is also the daughter of a middle-ranking government official in Shanghai, and a former member of the Communist Youth League who has resided in Hong Kong for over 6 years. Her application to permanent residency of Hong Kong has been reportedly fast-tracked. Lee Cheuk-yan criticised Leung of "seeding a Communist princeling" in the civil service. The CE-elect's office said that Chen had not been actively involved in the Youth League since 2005; the DAB said it was appropriate for Leung to recruit people who shared his vision. An op-ed in The Standard said that "almost every bright student is invited to join the CYL," but that "Leung should have been aware of the sensitivity involved". The appointment makes the CE-elect's office the third government department to recruit a non-permanent resident since the system of non-civil service contracts was put in place in 1999.

== Restructure of governing apparatus ==
In April 2012, chief Leung announced his plan to reform the government, "aimed at providing better service to the public while boosting governance". Under the plan, two more deputy secretaries are to be created – a new deputy chief secretary and deputy financial secretary – to join the chief secretary, financial secretary, and secretary for justice. Leung announced his desire to create a Culture Bureau; Housing and Transport would be split into two bureaux and Housing would merge with Lands and planning. The newly created Deputy chief secretary position will be responsible for the Labour and Welfare, Education and cultural affairs bureaux. The Chief Secretary is to oversee the environment, Food and health, Home affairs, Security, Civil service, and Constitutional and mainland affairs. The financial secretary is to oversee Housing, planning and lands, Works, Transport and Financial Services and the treasury bureaux. The Deputy financial secretary will be in overall charge of the Commerce, industrial and tourism, as well as the Information and technology bureaux. To allow for a smooth transition, the government agreed to table Leung's restructuring plan before LegCo before it dissolved for the summer. However, Pan Democrats believed careful scrutiny was necessary, and strongly opposed the plan to rush through the changes; People Power representatives in Legco warned they would table some 900 motions at the finance committee meeting on 15 June and over 100 amendments at the plenary council meeting on 20 June.

== Cabinet ==
=== Ministry ===
The new ministerial line-up under Leung was announced on 28 June 2012. As Leung's proposed structure had not yet passed through the legislature, the posts were announced under the existing structures.

The line-up was expanded by adding one new Innovation and Technology Bureau headed by Nicholas Yang in November 2015.

Major changes in the office were the resignations of chief secretary for administration Carrie Lam and financial secretary John Tsang on 16 January 2017 to run in the 2017 chief executive election. The posts were filled by the secretary for labour and welfare Matthew Cheung and the secretary for development Paul Chan respectively.

| Portfolio | Minister | Took office | Left office | Party |
|---|---|---|---|---|
| Chief Executive | CY Leung | 1 July 2012 | 30 June 2017 | Nonpartisan |
| Chief Secretary for Administration | Carrie Lam | 1 July 2012 | 16 January 2017 | Nonpartisan |
| Chief Secretary for Administration | Matthew Cheung | 16 January 2017 | Lam | Nonpartisan |
| Financial Secretary | John Tsang | 1 July 2007 | 16 January 2017 | Nonpartisan |
| Financial Secretary | Paul Chan | 16 January 2017 | Lam | Nonpartisan |
| Secretary for Justice | Rimsky Yuen | 1 July 2012 | Lam | Nonpartisan |
| Secretary for the Civil Service | Paul Tang | 1 July 2012 | 21 July 2015 | Nonpartisan |
| Secretary for the Civil Service | Clement Cheung | 21 July 2015 | 30 June 2017 | Nonpartisan |
| Secretary for Commerce and Economic Development | Gregory So | 28 June 2011 | 30 June 2017 | DAB |
| Secretary for Constitutional and Mainland Affairs | Raymond Tam | 30 September 2011 | 30 June 2017 | Nonpartisan |
| Secretary for Development | Mak Chai-kwong | 1 July 2012 | 30 July 2012 | Nonpartisan |
| Secretary for Development | Paul Chan | 30 July 2012 | 16 January 2017 | Nonpartisan |
| Secretary for Development | Eric Ma | 13 February 2017 | 30 June 2017 | Nonpartisan |
| Secretary for Education | Eddie Ng | 1 July 2012 | 30 June 2017 | Nonpartisan |
| Secretary for the Environment | Wong Kam-sing | 1 July 2012 | Lam | Nonpartisan |
| Secretary for Financial Services and the Treasury | KC Chan | 1 July 2007 | 30 June 2017 | Nonpartisan |
| Secretary for Food and Health | Ko Wing-man | 1 July 2012 | 30 June 2017 | Nonpartisan |
| Secretary for Home Affairs | Tsang Tak-sing | 1 July 2007 | 21 July 2015 | Nonpartisan |
| Secretary for Home Affairs | Lau Kong-wah | 21 July 2015 | Lam | DAB |
| Secretary for Innovation and Technology | Nicholas Yang | 20 November 2015 | Lam | Nonpartisan |
| Secretary for Labour and Welfare | Matthew Cheung | 1 July 2007 | 16 January 2017 | Nonpartisan |
| Secretary for Labour and Welfare | Stephen Sui | 13 February 2017 | 30 June 2017 | Nonpartisan |
| Secretary for Security | Lai Tung-kwok | 1 July 2012 | 30 June 2017 | Nonpartisan |
| Secretary for Transport and Housing | Anthony Cheung | 1 July 2012 | 30 June 2017 | Nonpartisan |

=== Executive Council non-official members ===
The executive council consisted of 30 members in total: chief executive being the president of the ExCo, 3 secretaries of the department and 12 heads of the bureaux as the 16 official members; 14 non-official members. In October 2012, two additional Legislative Council members, Regina Ip, chairwoman of the New People's Party and Jeffrey Lam, vice-chairman of the Business and Professionals Alliance for Hong Kong were appointed to the executive council as non-official members after the 2012 Legislative Council election, which made the total members of the ExCo to 32. After Barry Cheung and Franklin Lam resigned from the ExCo, the chief executive did not reappoint new members to the council. Nicholas Yang became an official member of the ExCo on 20 November 2015 when he took the Secretary for Innovation and Technology post. Two more non-official members, Legislative Council members Tommy Cheung and Martin Liao were appointed in November 2016, which made the council divided evenly with 16 official and 16 non-official members excluding the chief executive.

| Members | Affiliation | Portfolio | Assumed office | Left office | Born in | Ref |
|---|---|---|---|---|---|---|
| Lam Woon-kwong | Nonpartisan | Non-official Convenor of the ExCo; Former civil servant | 1 July 2012 | 30 June 2017 | 1951 | |
| Cheng Yiu-tong | FTU | Honorary president of FTU | 1 July 2002 | 30 June 2017 | 1951 | |
| Laura Cha | Nonpartisan | Non-executive deputy chairman of HSBC | 19 October 2004 | Lam | 1949 | |
| Anna Wu | Nonpartisan | Management consultant | 21 January 2009 | 30 June 2017 | 1951 | |
| Arthur Li | Nonpartisan | Deputy chairman of Bank of East Asia | 1 July 2012 | Lam | 1945 | |
| Andrew Liao | Nonpartisan | Former deputy judge of High Court | 1 July 2012 | 30 June 2017 | 1949 | |
| Chow Chung-kong | Nonpartisan | Chairman of HKEx and HKGCC | 1 July 2012 | Lam | 1950 | |
| Fanny Law | Nonpartisan | Former government official | 1 July 2012 | Lam | 1953 | |
| Barry Cheung | Nonpartisan | Chairman of HKMEx and URA | 1 July 2012 | 24 May 2013 | 1955 | |
| Cheung Chi-kong | Nonpartisan | Executive director of One Country Two Systems Research Institute | 1 July 2012 | Lam | 1953 | |
| Franklin Lam | Nonpartisan | Former senior portfolio manager at UBS Global Asset Management | 1 July 2012 | 1 August 2013 | 1961 | |
| Bernard Chan | Nonpartisan | Businessman and politician | 1 July 2012 | Lam | 1965 | |
| Cheung Hok-ming | DAB | Vice-chairman of Heung Yee Kuk | 1 July 2012 | 30 June 2017 | 1952 | |
| Starry Lee | DAB | Legislative Council member | 1 July 2012 | 17 March 2016 | 1974 | |
| Regina Ip | NPP | Legislative Council member | 17 October 2012 | 15 December 2016 | 1950 | |
| Jeffrey Lam | BPA | Legislative Council member | 17 October 2012 | Lam | 1951 | |
| Nicholas Yang | Nonpartisan | Vice President of Hong Kong Polytechnic University | 2 March 2015 | 20 November 2015 | 1955 | |
| Ip Kwok-him | DAB | Legislative Council member | 17 March 2016 | Lam | 1951 | |
| Martin Liao | Nonpartisan | Legislative Council member | 25 November 2016 | Lam | 1957 | |
| Tommy Cheung | Liberal | Legislative Council member | 25 November 2016 | Lam | 1949 | |

=== Mak Chai-kwong housing allowance allegations ===
Newly appointed development minister, Mak Chai-kwong, became embroiled in controversy when disclosures surfaced about the cross-leasing scheme he allegedly used to claim housing allowance some 20 years ago as a civil servant The incident led to his arrest by the ICAC and his resignation, twelve days into his appointment. He was replaced by former Accountancy functional constituency lawmaker, Paul Chan.

=== Other posts ===
- Commissioner, Independent Commission Against Corruption – Simon Peh
- Director of Audit – David Sun
- Director, Office of Chief Executive of the SAR – Edward Yau

== National education ==
Furore erupted in the first week of July 2012, when the National Education Services Centre and National Education Centre published a 34-page education booklet on the Beijing Consensus in which one-party rule was praised. it was revealed that the previous administration had granted at least HK$72 million (US$9.2 million) over six years to the two companies to produce these materials, which were accused of being "biased".

The Leung administration, which steadfastly resisted public pressure to scrap the subject, was accused of attempting to force through the Beijing government's agenda to "brainwash" its citizens against popular opposition. A street protest against the introduction on 29 July organised by civic, teacher, parent, and student groups opposed to the introduction was attended by an estimated crowd of 90,000.

== Umbrella Revolution ==
Sit-in protests frequently referred to as the Umbrella Revolution began in September 2014 in response to the decision of the Standing Committee of the National People's Congress (NPCSC) on reforms to the Hong Kong electoral system. Benny Tai, one of the principals of Occupy Central with Love and Peace (OCLP), planted the seeds of a civil disobedience movement in January 2013 should the framework not conform to international standards. In light of the highly restrictive electoral framework announced on 31 August 2014, which was tantamount to Communist Party pre-approval of candidates allowed to present themselves to the Hong Kong electorate, students mobilised a class boycott to protest the decision beginning on 22 September 2014. The Hong Kong Federation of Students and Scholarism started protesting outside the government headquarters on 26 September 2014; OCLP kicked off their civil disobedience campaign on 28 September. Demonstrations began outside the Hong Kong Government headquarters in northern Hong Kong Island, and eventually a swell of protesters then blocked both east–west arterial routes in Admiralty. Aggressive policing (including the use of tear gas) and attacks on protesters by opponents that included triad members, triggered more citizens to join the protests, occupying Causeway Bay and Mong Kok. Members of what would eventually be called the Umbrella Movement occupied several major city intersections, with the number of protesters peaking at more than 100,000.

Government officials in Hong Kong and in Beijing denounced the occupation as "illegal" and "violation of the rule of law", and Chinese state media and officials claimed repeatedly that the West had played an "instigating" role in the protests, and warned of "deaths and injuries and other grave consequences." In an opinion poll carried out by the Chinese University of Hong Kong, only 36.1% of 802 people surveyed between 8–15 October accept NPCSC's decision but 55.6% are willing to accept if HKSAR Government would democratise the nominating committee during the second phase of public consultation period. The protests precipitated a rift in Hong Kong society, and galvanised youth – a previously apolitical section of society – into political activism or heightened awareness of their civil rights and responsibilities. Not only were there fist fights at occupation sites and flame wars on social media, family members found themselves on different sides of the conflict.

Key areas in Admiralty, Causeway Bay, and Mong Kok were occupied and remained closed to traffic for over 70 days. Despite numerous incidents of intimidation and violence by triads and thugs, particularly in Mong Kok, and several attempts at clearance by the police, suffragists held their ground for over two months. CY Leung then made the famous comments referring to representative democracy as a numbers game because "you'd be talking to half the people in Hong Kong [that] earn less than US$1,800 a month [the median wage in HK]. You would end up with that kind of politics and policies". After the Mong Kok occupation site was cleared with some scuffles on 25 November, Admiralty and Causeway Bay were cleared with no opposition on 11 and 14 December respectively. Throughout the protests the HK government's use of the police and courts to resolve political issues led to accusations from liberal media that these institutions had been turned into a political tools, thereby compromising the police and judicial system in the territory and eroding the rule of law in favour of "rule by law". Police inactions and violent actions throughout the occupation and severely damaged the reputation of Hong Kong Police, which was once recognised as the most efficient and professional police forces in the Asia Pacific region. The protests ended without any political concessions from the government, but instead triggered a torrent of rhetoric and propaganda from CY Leung and mainland officials about rule of law and patriotism, and an assault on academic freedoms and civil liberties of activists.

On 19 October 2014, Leung claimed that "foreign forces" were behind the protests. He said that the government had evidence for this claim that would be disclosed at an "appropriate time". In early 2015, in an event that was only open to the pro-government newspapers Ta Kung Pao and Wen Wei Po, he repeated his claim that there was significant evidence that foreign elements were behind the organisation of the Umbrella Movement but still did not substantiate his claims with evidence. As of 2023 Leung still has not provided any evidence.

== Failure of political reform vote ==
The Communist Party leadership in Beijing had hailed its package – the electoral framework decision by the NPCSC of 31 August 2014 – as momentous political gift of direct elections for their leader that the British never made to its colony, yet opponents derided the election from list of candidates pre-screened by a nomination committee composed mainly of pro-Beijing loyalists and business elites as violating the pledge for universal suffrage within the Basic Law and in the Sino-British Joint Declaration. Public opinion polls indicated even split between those who supported voting against Beijing's dictat, and those who believed that it was better to accept a flawed plan. The regime stated before the vote that there would be no compromise. In the face of staunch opposition by Pan-democratic legislators and their oft-repeated promises of veto and the insufficient numbers to secure a two-thirds majority, the HK government initiated a propaganda campaign to build public support to put pressure on the recalcitrant lawmakers. Secretary for Constitutional and Mainland Affairs Raymond Tam Chi-yuen confirmed on 2 June 2015 that reform proposals would be tabled to the Legislative Council on 17 June with no modifications.

During the second day of the debate on 18 June 2015, right before the vote, Ip Kwok-him and Jeffrey Lam Kin-fung led a walk-out of pro-Beijing legislators after the chairman denied Lam's request for a 15-minute recess. Lam later explained that the walk-out was an impromptu attempt to delay the division so that his party member Lau Wong-fat, who was delayed, could cast his vote in favour of the Beijing-backed reforms. However, five Liberal Party legislators, Chan Yuen-han of the FTU and two other pro-Beijing independents remained in the chamber, so quorum was maintained; they voted in favour of the proposal. On the other hand, all 27 pan-democrats and one pro-Beijing legislator Leung Ka-lau representing the Medical constituency voted against, so the government's reform proposal failed by 8:28.

Since it had been widely expected the reform would be vetoed by being six votes short of the absolute majority stipulated by the Basic Law, the pro-Beijing camp's sudden walk-out resulted in a surprising landslide defeat that gave the world the impression there was no support for the reform proposals in Hong Kong. The fiasco was described by analysts as an "embarrassment" for Beijing, and those who had participated in the walk-out headed for the Central Government's Liaison Office to give their accounts for their actions. CY Leung and the Communist regime shifted the responsibility of the monumental defeat onto the Pan-Democrats. Leung said: "Today 28 legco members voted against the wishes of the majority of Hong Kong people, and denied them the democratic right to elect the chief executive in the next election". The Liaison Office blamed: "a minority of legislators, acting out of selfish interests".

== Anti-parallel traders protests ==
As a result of rising tensions in society due to the volume of cross border parallel traders causing disruption to stores, transport, and the way of life more generally. Although the government said that it had put in place certain measures, such as blocking some 25,000 suspected parallel traders from entering Hong Kong, inspection of industrial buildings for use in violations of leases, the prosecution of cross-border visitors carrying an excess of the permitted quantity of milk powder, the problem of their disruption of daily life in the northern part of Hong Kong persists. Radical localist camp such as Civic Passion and Hong Kong Indigenous initiated direct action against the unlimited multiple re-entry visa within the Individual Visit Scheme for PRC residents over three successive Sundays starting on 8 February 2015 in the most affected parts of the city. These protests brought worldwide media attention to the locals' grievances.

== Lead in water scandal ==
On 5 July 2015 Democratic Party legislator Wong Pik-wan exposed the lead contamination in tap water at Kai Ching Estate, a newly constructed public housing estate in Kowloon City, thereby beginning the "Hong Kong watergate". The affair became a full-fledged scandal that undermined the credibility of the government after officials attempted to pass the blame onto a building contractor. It further intensified after the press and public discovered throughout the following months of more and more instances of lead contamination, including in schools and on other premises. Secretary for Education Eddie Ng failed to deal with the matter as reported contamination spread into local education establishments on 21 August. The public furore Ng earned when he initially refused to test the water supply in all kindergartens or install water filters to help protect the health and welfare of highly vulnerable children only abated when Chief Secretary Carrie Lam announced on 3 September that tests would be conducted on supplies to kindergartens across the territory to ensure the safe potable water for the most vulnerable schoolchildren.

The government's handling of the crisis caused CY Leung's support rate to hit a new low since he came to power in 2012. Results of a survey released in early September showed Leung was disapproved of across all demographics. Approvals amounted to 22 percent and disapprovals were 62 percent – a net popularity of negative 39 percentage points; similarly, the satisfaction rate for the HK government stood at 21 percent while its dissatisfaction rate is at 50 percent – a net of negative 29 points.

== Cross-border abduction incident ==
The disappearances of five Hong Kong people related to an independent publisher and bookstore in October to December 2015 precipitated an international outcry. At least two of them disappeared in mainland China, one in Thailand. One member was last seen in Hong Kong, but apparently had found his way to Shenzhen, across the Chinese border, without the necessary travel documents. The October disappearances were muted, as unexplained disappearances and lengthy extrajudicial detentions are known to occur in mainland China. The unprecedented disappearance of a person in Hong Kong, and the bizarre events surrounding it, shocked the city and crystallised international concern over the possible abduction of Hong Kong citizens by Chinese public security bureau officials and their likely rendition, and the violation of several articles of the Basic Law and the one country, two systems principle. Following widespread suspicion for several months, it was separately confirmed in February 2016 by Guangdong provincial authorities that they had been taken into custody in relation to a case involving Gui Minhai.

== Mong Kok unrest ==
In the run-up to the Chinese New Year, localist group Hong Kong Indigenous called for action online to shield the street hawkers, who sold Hong Kong street food in which they saw as part of the Hong Kong culture, from government health department's attempts at eradication. The protest on 8 February 2016 escalated to violent clashes between the police and the protesters that lasted until the next morning. The Hong Kong government classified the violent incident as a riot, while some media outlets and social media platforms have opted for calling the event "Fishball Revolution" (魚蛋革命), in reference to the popular Hong Kong street food item. The Chinese foreign ministry blamed the violence on "separatists". The 66,000 votes polled by Hong Kong Indigenous member Edward Leung Tin-kei in the New Territories East by-election three weeks later was seen as a milestone for localism in Hong Kong politics.

== 2016 visit by Zhang Dejiang ==
Zhang Dejiang, then-chairman of the National People's Congress, arrived in Hong Kong on 17 May 2016 for a three-day visit in his capacity as the official responsible for Hong Kong and Macau affairs. Citizens questioned the need for the deployment of 6,000 police officers – more than double the number that were enlisted when Chinese Communist Party general secretary Hu Jintao visited Hong Kong three years earlier. Security measures included suspending construction work for Sha Tin to Central Link of the MTR, the cordoning off an area within a one-block radius of his hotel, gluing down bricks outside the pavement near his hotel. The gluing attracted the satirical response from Trevor Noah at Comedy Central, saying "They started gluing down their sidewalks? So protesters can't grab the bricks and throw them?" Parts of the city were in lockdown by the 8,000 police officers who were eventually deployed, unprecedentedly in a counter-terrorist operation. Zhang was protected by heavily armed police officers and a 45-car cortège. Despite the high level of alert, activists managed to put up massive banners in prominent locations to welcome Zhang – whilst some banners recalled the Umbrella revolution slogan "I want genuine universal suffrage", another, which read: "End Chinese Communist Party dictatorship", was hung up and visible to Zhang's motorcade from the airport. Zhang spoke at a policy conference on Communist Party General Secretary Xi Jinping's One Belt, One Road economic project that aims to improve connectivity between China and Eurasia and met four pro-democracy legislators at a reception, ahead of a banquet. Pan-democrats boycotted the event at which Zhang spoke. CY Leung received what commentators described a guarded endorsement from Zhang.

== Wang Chau controversy ==
Within days of the 2016 legislative elections and the decisive victory of Eddie Chu in the New Territories West constituency, Chu made allegations that the government was in collusion with business interests, rural kingpins and Triads. He has received death threats for his advocacy and is placed under police protection. Although CY Leung initially attempted to blame financial secretary John Tsang and Chief Secretary Carrie Lam, leaked internal government meeting minutes directly implicated CY Leung in a decision to defer to the interests of Heung Yee Kuk leaders by scaling down a planned housing development in Wang Chau in the New Territories from 13,000 units to 4000 units, razing a greenfield site whilst avoiding brownfield site illegally occupied by the Chairman of the rural committee in Shap Pat Heung.

== See also ==
- Lam government
- General secretaryship of Xi Jinping

== Notes ==
| Preceded by Tsang II | Government of Hong Kong; 2012–2017 | Succeeded by Lam |
