= Second Tsang government =

2007–2012 administration of Hong Kong

Second Donald Tsang Government
- 3rd Government of the Hong Kong; Special Administrative Region

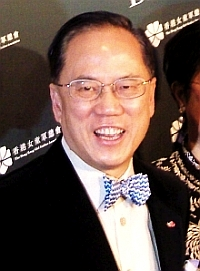
- Date formed: 1 July 2007
- Date dissolved: 30 June 2012

People and organisations
- Head of state: Hu Jintao
- Head of government: Donald Tsang
- No. of ministers: 15
- Member parties: DAB, LP, FTU, TA, ES
- Status in legislature: Pro-Beijing majority
- Opposition party: Pan-democracy camp

History
- Election: 2007 Chief Executive election
- Legislature terms: 3rd Legislative Council; 4th Legislative Council
- Predecessor: First Tsang government
- Successor: Leung government

The Second term of Donald Tsang as Chief Executive of Hong Kong, officially referred to as "The 3rd term Chief Executive of Hong Kong" relates to the period of governance of Hong Kong since the transfer of sovereignty over Hong Kong, between 1 July 2007 and 30 June 2012. Former civil-servant Donald Tsang was the Chief Executive throughout the duration.

== Election ==
Donald Tsang won the landslide victory by winning 649 votes in the 800-member Election Committee against pro-democrat contender, Civic Party legislator Alan Leong.

== Cabinet ==
=== Ministry ===
The bureaux were reorganised and expanded by adding one new Development Bureau headed by Carrie Lam.

Major change in the office was the Chief Secretary Henry Tang resigned from office in September 2011 in order to run in the 2012 Chief Executive election. The post was filled by the Secretary for Constitutional and Mainland Affairs Stephen Lam.

Portfolio	Minister	Took office	Left office	Party
Chief Executive	Donald Tsang	1 July 2007	30 June 2012	Nonpartisan
Chief Secretary for Administration	Henry Tang	1 July 2007	30 September 2011	Nonpartisan
Chief Secretary for Administration	Stephen Lam	30 September 2011	30 June 2012	Nonpartisan
Financial Secretary	John Tsang	1 July 2007	Leung	Nonpartisan
Secretary for Justice	Wong Yan-lung	20 October 2005	30 June 2012	Nonpartisan
Secretary for the Civil Service	Denise Yue	24 January 2006	30 June 2012	Nonpartisan
Secretary for Commerce and Economic Development	Frederick Ma	1 July 2002	11 July 2008	Nonpartisan
Secretary for Commerce and Economic Development	Rita Lau	12 July 2008	11 April 2011	Nonpartisan
Secretary for Commerce and Economic Development	Gregory So	28 June 2011	Leung	DAB
Secretary for Constitutional and Mainland Affairs	Stephen Lam	1 July 2007	29 September 2011	Nonpartisan
Secretary for Constitutional and Mainland Affairs	Raymond Tam	30 September 2011	Leung	Nonpartisan
Secretary for Development	Carrie Lam	1 July 2007	30 June 2012	Nonpartisan
Secretary for Education	Michael Suen	1 July 2007	30 June 2012	Nonpartisan
Secretary for the Environment	Edward Yau	1 July 2007	30 June 2012	Nonpartisan
Secretary for Financial Services and the Treasury	KC Chan	1 July 2007	Leung	Nonpartisan
Secretary for Food and Health	York Chow	12 October 2004	30 June 2012	Nonpartisan
Secretary for Home Affairs	Tsang Tak-sing	1 July 2007	Leung	Nonpartisan
Secretary for Labour and Welfare	Matthew Cheung	1 July 2007	Leung	Nonpartisan
Secretary for Security	Ambrose Lee	1 July 2007	30 June 2012	Nonpartisan
Secretary for Transport and Housing	Eva Cheng	1 July 2007	30 June 2012	Nonpartisan

=== Executive Council non-official members ===
The Executive Council consisted of a total of 31 members: 3 secretaries of the department and 12 secretaries of the bureaux and 16 non-official members. In January 2009, Donald Tsang reorganised the Council by appointing 5 new members.

Jasper Tsang Yok-sing, the former chairman of the Democratic Alliance for the Betterment and Progress of Hong Kong (DAB) resigned from the ExCo after he was elected as the President of the Legislative Council. The Chief Executive filled Lau Kong-wah, another DAB Legislative Council member to Jasper Tsang's seat.

Selina Chow of the Liberal Party resigned from the ExCo after she lost her LegCo seat in the 2008 Legislative Council election.

In October 2011, Leung Chun-ying resigned as the Convenor of the Executive Council non-official members to run for the Chief Executive election in 2012. Ronald Arculli became the Convenor until his term expired on 30 June 2012.

Members	Affiliation	Portfolio	Took Office	Left Office	Ref
CY Leung	Nonpartisan	Non-official Convenor of the ExCo (1999–2011); Chartered surveyor	1 July 1997	3 October 2011	
Jasper Tsang	DAB	Legislative Councillor	1 July 2002	14 October 2008	
Cheng Yiu-tong	FTU	General secretary of FTU	1 July 2002	Leung	
Andrew Liao	Nonpartisan	Former deputy judge of High Court	1 July 2002	20 January 2009	
Selina Chow	Liberal	Legislative Councillor	22 September 2003	18 September 2008	
Laura Cha	Nonpartisan	Non-executive deputy chairman of HSBC	19 October 2004	Leung	
Bernard Chan	Alliance	Businessman and politician	26 October 2004	20 January 2009	
Ronald Arculli	Nonpartisan	Non-official Convenor of the ExCo (2011–12); Chairman of HKEx	1 November 2005	30 June 2012	
Charles Lee	Nonpartisan	Former chairman of HKEx and director of Cheung Kong Holdings	1 November 2005	30 June 2012	
David Li	Nonpartisan	CEO of Bank of East Asia and Legislative Councillor	1 November 2005	15 February 2008	
Leong Che-hung	Nonpartisan	Former Chairman of Hospital Authority	1 November 2005	30 June 2012	
Marvin Cheung	Nonpartisan	Former Chairman of Airport Authority	1 November 2005	30 June 2012	
Henry Fan	Nonpartisan	Managing director of CITIC Pacific	1 November 2005	20 January 2009	
Victor Lo	Nonpartisan	CEO of Gold Peak Industries	1 November 2005	20 January 2009	
Anthony Cheung	Nonpartisan	President of the Hong Kong Institute of Education	1 November 2005	30 June 2012	
Rafael Hui	Nonpartisan	Former Chief Secretary	1 July 2007	20 January 2009	
Lau Kong-wah	DAB	Legislative Councillor	15 October 2008	30 June 2012	
Lau Wong-fat	Economic Synergy	Chairman of Heung Yee Kuk	21 January 2009	30 June 2012	
Lawrence J. Lau	Nonpartisan	Former vice-chancellor of Chinese University of Hong Kong	21 January 2009	30 June 2012	
Anna Wu	Nonpartisan	Management consultant	21 January 2009	Leung	
Marjorie Yang	Nonpartisan	Council Chairwoman of Hong Kong Polytechnic University	21 January 2009	30 June 2012	
V-nee Yeh	Nonpartisan	Honorary chairman of Value Partners Group	21 January 2009	30 June 2012	

== Second term ==
=== Five-year policy blueprint ===
Following his re-election as the Chief Executive in 2007, Tsang set out the 5-year blueprint for the Third Term HKSAR Government in his Policy Address (2007–08). He stressed the importance of "progressive development", a core element of which is the promotion of community development through revitalization of the built heritage in the city.which is to be realized by promoting economic development through infrastructure projects, promoting community development through revitalization, and promoting social harmony under the concept of helping people to help themselves.

=== Ten major infrastructure projects ===
Tsang has undertaken to push ahead with 10 large-scale infrastructure projects within his term of office to boost economic activities and improve the living environment in Hong Kong. Those projects include:

- South Island Line (from Admiralty to Wong Chuk Hang)
- Tuen Ma Line (from Tai Wai to Hung Hom) and East Rail Line Extension from Hung Hom to Admiralty
- Guangzhou-Shenzhen-Hong Kong Express Rail Link (High Speed Rail, to reduce congestion in East Rail Line)
- West Island Line (from Sheung Wan to Kennedy Town)
- Kwun Tong Line Extension to Whampoa from Yau Ma Tei
- Hong Kong-Zhuhai-Macao Bridge
- Tuen Mun-Chek Lap Kok Link and Tuen Mun Western Bypass
- Hong Kong-Shenzhen Airport Co-operation
- Hong Kong-Shenzhen Joint Development of the Lok Ma Chau Loop
- West Kowloon Cultural District
- Kai Tak Development Plan
- New Development Areas at Kwu Tung North, Fanling North, Ping Che and Ta Kwu Ling and Hung Shui Kiu.

=== Education reform ===
Placing a strong emphasis on education, Tsang decided to extend free education in Hong Kong from nine to twelve years starting from the 2008-2009 school year. Coupled with the Pre-primary Education Voucher Scheme, Tsang aimed at reducing inter-generational poverty by helping children of low-income families grow and learn from early childhood to adolescence.

=== Heritage Conservation ===
Tsang set up a Commissioner for Heritage Office and earmarked $1 billion to revitalize historic buildings. He also proposed a series of revitalization projects that would add a new dimension to Central. For instance, to reduce the development density of the Central Ferry Piers site and open up the public space along the waterfront for entertainment, recreational and cultural uses; to remove the Central Market from the Application List and hand it over to the Urban Renewal Authority for conservation and revitalization; and to convert the Murray Building into a hotel through open tender etc.

=== Environmental protection ===
The Government is committed to reducing the energy intensity of Hong Kong by at least 25% by 2030, compared to 2005 levels. A series of measures have been introduced to promote the use of cleaner fuel and improved energy efficiency. For example, progress was being made on ensuring the provision of cleaner fuel from the Mainland to Hong Kong including starting work on the construction a pipeline supplying natural gas to the city and the recently renewed agreement on the supply of nuclear electricity for a further term of 20 years.

=== Political Appointments System ===
The government named eight newly appointed Undersecretaries on 20 May 2008, and nine Political Assistants two days later, out of a total of 24 newly created positions ostensibly to work closely with bureau secretaries and top civil servants in implementing the Chief Executive's policy blueprint and agenda in an executive-led government. Tsang described the appointments as a milestone in the development of Hong Kong's political appointment system.

A row endured for three weeks over the appointees' foreign nationalities, experience and remuneration levels, and transparency of the selection process. Tsang apologised for not having arranged for the new appointees to meet the public, whilst maintaining there were important points of principle to defend vis à vis the appointees' remuneration and nationalities. Tsang was criticised for the lack of transparency over the appointments, and his apology was seen as 'grudging' and 'reluctant'. A SCMP poll conducted by TNS showed Tsang's popularity declining sharply following the three-week row over the introduction of the Political Appointments System; his disapproval rating rose from 18% to a record 24%, while his approval rating declined from 66% to 60.8% in the space of three weeks. His approval/disapproval rating continued to deteriorate, and stood at 39 percent/41 percent as at late August 2008.

=== Financial stimulus packages ===
Since the outbreak of the financial tsunami in September 2008, the Hong Kong SAR Government immediately introduced a series of measures with a view to "stabilising the financial system, supporting enterprises and preserving employment". The Hong Kong Monetary Authority introduced a full deposit protection scheme. The Government also launched a loan guarantee schemes to stabilize thousands of enterprises and secure more than 240 000 jobs. The Government's relief measures have amounted to more than HK$87 billion — equivalent to 5.2% of the city’s GDP, higher than the average for the G-20 economies. These measures have successfully stabilized the economy without impairing the Government's fiscal position in the long term.

On 16 July 2008, Donald Tsang announced some "extraordinary measures for extraordinary times", giving a total of HK$11 billion in inflation relief to help families' finances. Of which, the Employee Retraining levy on the employment of Foreign domestic helpers would be temporarily waived, at an estimated cost of $HK2 billion. It was intended that the levy would be waived for a two-year period on all helpers' employment contracts signed on or after 1 September 2008, but would not apply to ongoing contracts. The Immigration Department said it would not reimburse levies, which are prepaid half-yearly or yearly in advance. The announcement resulted in chaos and confusion, and uncertainty for the helpers as some employers deferred contracts or had dismissed helpers pending confirmation of the effective date, leaving helpers in limbo. On 20 July, Secretary for Labour and Welfare Matthew Cheung announced the waiver commencement date would be brought forward by one month. The Immigration Department would relax its 14-day re-employment requirement for helpers whose contracts expired. On 30 July, the Executive Council approved the measures. After widespread criticism of the situation, the government also conceded that maids having advanced renewal of contract would not be required to leave Hong Kong through the discretion exercised by the Director of Immigration, and employers would benefit from the waiver simply by renewing the contract within the two-year period, admitting that some employers could benefit from the waiver for up to 4 years. The administration's poor handling of the matter came in for heavy criticism. The administrative credibility and competence were called into question by journals from all sides of the political spectrum, and by helpers and employers alike.

=== Leung Chin-man appointment ===
In August 2008, the appointment of Leung Chin-man as deputy managing director and executive director of New World China Land, subsidiary of New World Development, was greeted with uproar amidst widespread public suspicion that job offer was a quid pro quo for the favours he allegedly granted to NWD. Leung was seen to have been involved with the sale of the Hung Hom Peninsula HOS public housing estate to NWD at under-value in 2004.

After a 12-month 'sterilisation period' after retirement, Leung submitted an application to the government on 9 May for approval to take up employment with New World China Land. The Secretary for the Civil Service, Denise Yue Chung-yee, signed off on the approval for him to take up the job after his request passed through the vetting committee.

Controversies surrounded not only the suspicions of Leung's own conflict of interest, but also of the insensitivity of the committee which recommended the approval for him to take up his lucrative new job less than two years after his official retirement. New World argued that they hired Leung in good faith after government clearance.

On 15 August, the Civil Service Bureau issued the report requested by Donald Tsang, where they admitted that they had neglected to consider Leung's role in the Hung Hom Peninsula affair. Donald Tsang asked the SCS to reassess the approval, and submit a report to him. New World Development announced in the early hours of 16 August that Leung had resigned from his post, without any compensation from either side or from the government, for the termination.

The next day, Donald Tsang confirmed that Denise Yue would not have to resign. He was satisfied with her apology and with the explanations offered by her. Tsang ordered a committee, of which Yue was to be a member, to be set up to perform a sweeping review of the system to process applications for former civil servants.

=== 2009 Policy address ===
To maintain Hong Kong’s leading edge over global competitors and create more quality jobs, Tsang believed that Hong Kong must, on one hand, build on its strength as an international financial centre and try every means to enhance the flow of people, goods, capital and information that are related to the four pillar industries. On the other hand, Hong Kong should also promote six industries where it enjoys clear advantages. Those industries are: education services, medical services, testing and certification, environmental industries, innovation and technology, and cultural and creative industries.

Tsang's policy address disappointed the pan democratic legislators as lacked anything of substance, the only mention of political reform was of consultations to begin in the following month. Democrats and pro-establishment parties alike also criticised the speech for the absence of policies to address livelihood issues. For the second year running, the three members of the League of Social Democrats interrupted the address, and throwing projectiles at the speaker. They were evicted.

However, Tsang's plan to give each household a 100 Hong Kong dollar (US$13) voucher in February to buy fluorescent bulbs aroused controversy. The plan will be funded by Hong Kong's two major electricity companies, and paid for ultimately by the consumer - the utilities will be granted 50 and 60 HK cents increases per kilowatt-hour of electricity. Ming Pao Daily News and Apple Daily sparked allegations of conflict of interests when they reported that the new policy may benefit Tsang's son's father-in-law, Mok Kam-tsuen, a Hong Kong distributor for Philips light bulbs. Tsang said that he was aiming to safeguard public interests, and denied there was any conflict of interest. A spokesman for Mok's company said they had never heard about the scheme before the policy address. Mr Mok also issued a statement, clarifying that his business has not monopolized the market, since his company also sells incandescent conventional light bulbs. In other words, any potential benefit that may be generated by the new policy will be offset by corresponding loss in the incandescent conventional light bulbs market. Lawmakers from across the political spectrum did not question Tsang's integrity.

Radio commentators suggested the policy and the allegations reflected a lack of political sensitivity on the part of the administration of public concerns about collusion between government officials and the business sector.

=== Zhou Yongjun incident ===
The administration was involved in controversy when Zhou Yongjun (周勇军), a former student activist during the Tiananmen Square protests of 1989, was rendered by the Hong Kong authorities to the People's Republic of China in September 2008. Zhou had attempted to enter Hong Kong from the United States via Macau using a forged Malaysian passport. Zhou's supporters alleged the renditioning to be illegal, and his lawyer, Democratic Party chairman Albert Ho, described Zhou's case as "posing the biggest challenge to the one country, two systems principle laid down in the Basic Law." The Government of Hong Kong refused to comment on individual cases; the People's Republic of China jailed Zhou for nine years, for an alleged incident of financial fraud in Hong Kong.

=== Guangzhou-Shenzhen-Hong Kong Express Rail Link ===
The government proposed construction Express Rail Link connecting Kowloon with the high-speed rail network of the People's Republic of China (PRC) at Shenzhen. As its name suggests, it is part of the rail link between Hong Kong and Guangzhou, the capital city of the Guangdong Province. Concerns over many aspects of the project were expressed, including significant cost escalations compared to estimates made one year previously; there were demonstrations of more than 1,000 people protesting against the construction of the rail link in late 2009 and early 2010. The Executive Council approved the implementation on 20 October 2009, paving the way for funding approval from the Finance Committee of the Legislative Council. Appropriations for the project of $64 billion were the territory's legislature on 16 January 2010 against the objections of the pro-democracy legislators.

=== Democratic development in Hong Kong ===
Following the launch of proposals for electoral reform in November 2009 which pan-democrats branded as a "rehash of the 2005 reform proposals", five pan-democrats resigned from the Legislative Council in early 2010 to trigger a by-election. They will stand in the by-election which they claim can be regarded as a de facto referendum for universal suffrage and the abolition of the functional constituencies.

=== 2012 Junket controversy ===
In February 2012, Tsang was discovered to have received favours and hospitality from business tycoons on various occasions; there were also allegations of preferential allocation of a luxury apartment to Tsang in exchange for granting of a broadcasting licence. The Hong Kong media exposed Tsang's plan to live his retirement life in a 6,500 sq ft apartment in the nearby city of Shenzhen. The luxurious apartment is owned by the developer Wong Cho-bau, who has ties with the Chinese government and runs multiple businesses in both China and Hong Kong. It was reported that Tsang was set to rent the flat at a substantially discounted rate while renovation works, provided by the developer, were tailored to the demands of Tsang's wife. Tsang argued that declaration was not necessary and that his lease did not affect the government's decision on granting the broadcasting licence to DBC; he also argued that the lease was at market value. The rental arrangement was widely considered politically insensitive and Tsang eventually dropped the plan in April. He was later summoned to answer questions from an open inquiry by the Hong Kong Legislative Council. This unprecedented revelations and move to impeach him launched by a pro-establishment legislator shook the confidence in integrity of the city's officials. Within weeks, two property magnates and the former chief secretary in his administration were arrested under allegations of bribery and corruption. The case resulted in the conviction of Rafael Hui, Thomas Kwok, and several executives of Sun Hung Kai Properties who acted as middlemen.

== See also ==
- First term of Donald Tsang as Chief Executive of Hong Kong
- First term of CY Leung as Chief Executive of Hong Kong

Preceded by Tsang I	Government of Hong Kong; 2007-2012	Succeeded by CY Leung
