= Barry Cheung =

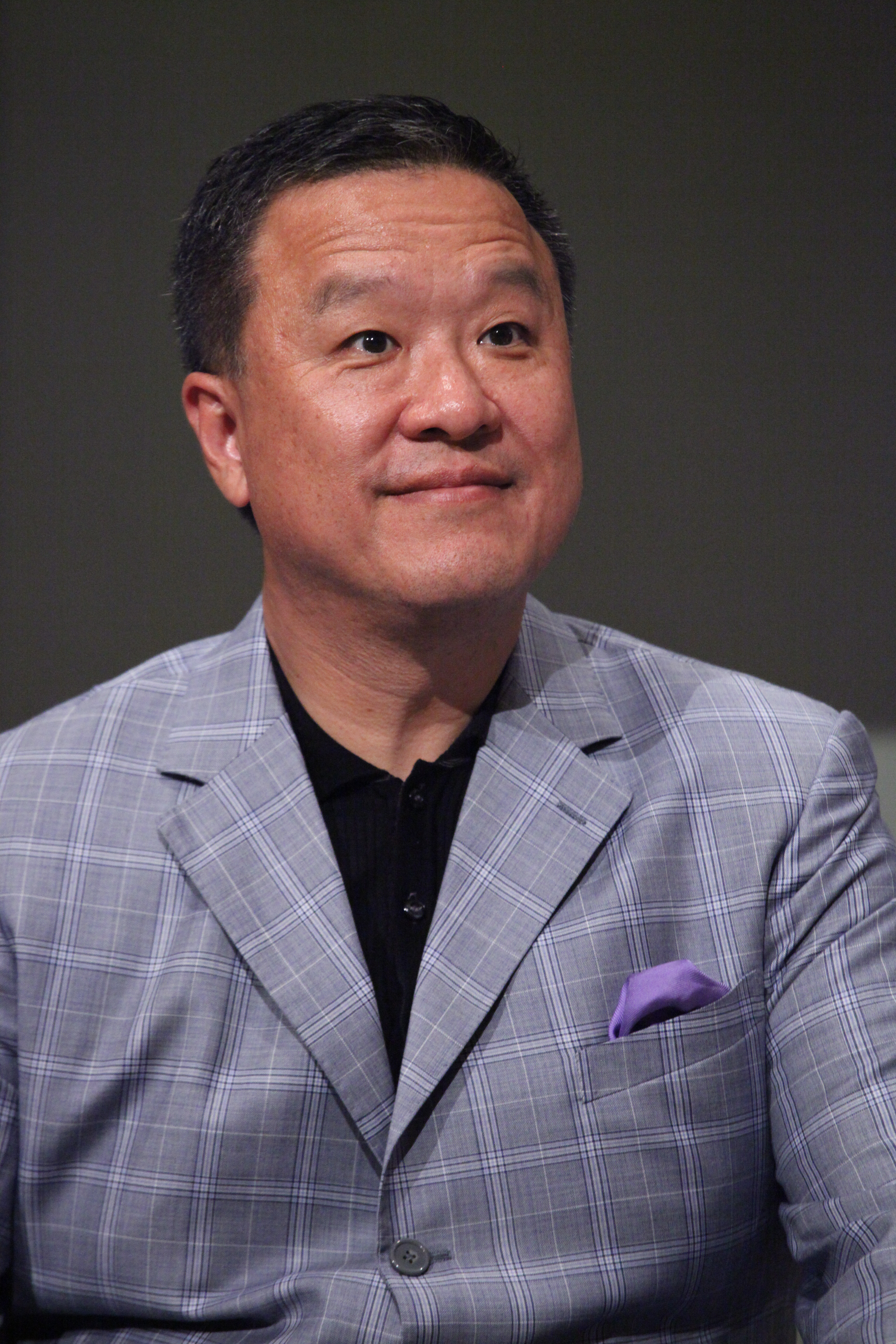
Barry Cheung

Barry Cheung Chun-yuen, GBS, JP (Chinese: 張震遠, born 15 February 1958 in British Hong Kong) is a Hong Kong businessman. Cheung is a former Non-official member of the Executive Council of Hong Kong, a chairman of Hong Kong Mercantile Exchange (HKMEx), and former chairman of the Urban Renewal Authority.

Cheung resigned from his official duties on 24 May 2013 amidst controversy and over the suspension of HKMEx by the securities regulator and allegations of possible irregularities at the exchange. The HKMex was subsequently wound up. Cheung was under criminal investigation by the Independent Commission Against Corruption (ICAC), on whose advisory committee Cheung had himself served, for allegedly receiving a $70M loan from a developer while he was Chairman of the Urban Renewal Authority. As reported on 1 June 2013 in the South China Morning Post. The government announced that Cheung was under investigation for criminal misconduct. On 15 April 2015, Cheung was declared bankrupt in the High Court.

== Education and work ==
Cheung holds a Bachelor of Science degree in Mathematics and Computer Science from the University of Sussex and an MBA from the Harvard Business School.

Cheung worked for the management consultancy McKinsey & Company; he was also a member of the Central Policy Unit of the Hong Kong government in 1993. In 1994, he left McKinsey to become chief executive of London Stock Exchange-listed Fortune Oil, a commodity trading company operating in mainland China. The company initially fared well under Cheung's stewardship. It expanded into jet fuel supply at two airports. However, the Asian financial crisis in 1998 caused oil prices to fall by a third. In early 1999 Fortune announced a loss of US$59.9 million. It had to seek $20 million in extra funding. After the recapitalisation in 1999, Cheung left Fortune. In 2004, Cheung was appointed chief executive of HKSE-listed 1192 Titan Petrochemicals Group, the Hong Kong subsidiary of Singapore-based Petro Titan, which invested in oil tankers. By 2007, Titan Petrochemicals was under water and was required to restructure, and sold off assets in order to settle debts and increase cash flow. Cheung resigned in 2008.

Cheung was recruited by Heidrich & Struggles to serve as an independent non-executive director ("INED") for UC Rusal. During Cheung's term as an INED for UC Rusal, Cheung retained his Chairmanship and equity ownership of 56% of the HKMex, as well as serving as the campaign manager for CY Leung. During this time, Cheung divested 10% of the HKMex to a controlled investment vehicle of the Russian billionaire Oleg Deripaska EN+ Oleg Deripaska of which Cheung still served as an INED. Cheung did not resign from any of interested positions these transactions posed: His INED position on UC Rusal, chairmanship of the HKMex or divest his own equity ownership in the HKMex. Cheung deepened this conflict of interest by accepting the chairmanship of Deripaska's aluminium company United Company RUSAL, to which he was serving as the INED. Cheung held chairmanships at both HKMex and UC Rusal, including equity ownership of 56% of the HKMex without regard to the conflict of interests this entanglement made. Cheung subsequently resigned when Hong Kong anti-corruption committee launched criminal investigations against Cheung. He has also served as a non-executive director of Hong Kong life insurer AIA, and was chairman of the newly built Harrow International School in Hong Kong. In addition, Cheung serves as a director on the board of Gateway Energy & Resource Holding, a joint venture vehicle between China Investment Corporation (CIC), a Chinese government investment vehicle, and Washington D.C. based EIG Global Energy Partners. It is unclear that Cheung has resigned this position.

Cheung was appointed to the board of the Urban Renewal Authority (URA) in 2001, and became its chairman on 24 April 2007. Cheung was an early backer of C Y Leung when the latter declared his candidacy for Hong Kong chief executive; Cheung managed the election campaign in 2012. He became an executive councillor in the CY Leung's first administration. The extension of his term as URA chairman in 2013, beyond the usual six-year limit on holding the same post, was alleged by the Civic Party to be a political reward.

=== HK Mercantile Exchange ===
Cheung launched the Hong Kong Mercantile Exchange in June 2008 as a trading platform. He was the chairman and majority shareholder, with a 56% stake. The exchange has been persistently loss-making. Competitive pressure got worse upon HKSE's acquisition of the London Metal Exchange in the second half of 2012. On 22 May 2013, Cheung took a leave of absence from his official duties after HKMEx folded and after the Securities and Futures Commission found "serious" suspected irregularities there that resulted in a police investigation and several arrests. Cheung has denied that the arrested persons were employees of HKMEx. Cheung resigned his RUSAL and AIA directorships following the announcement that he was under police investigation. He resigned from all his official positions, including his membership of the Executive Council and the URA, on 24 May 2013, when he became subject to a criminal investigation upon the collapse of the exchange. At a hearing in August 2014, businessman Leung Chi-hon and investor in CNQC International Holdings petitioned Cheung's bankruptcy due to the latter's inability to repay 4.7 million owing to him. On 15 April, Cheung was declared bankrupt by the High Court.

In April 2015 the Kowloon City Magistrates’ Court found Cheung guilty of failing to pay an employee $340,000 while chairman of the Hong Kong Mercantile Exchange, and then defaulting on a sum paid to the employee by the Labour Tribunal under the Employment Ordinance. He pleaded guilty to both charges and was sentenced to six months in prison. Cheung appealed and the sentence was reduced to 160 hours of community service.

Order of precedence
Preceded by Carrie Yau; Recipients of the Gold Bauhinia Star	Hong Kong order of precedence Recipients of the Gold Bauhinia Star	Succeeded by Chan Chun-yuen; Recipients of the Gold Bauhinia Star
