= The 2nd term Chief Executive of Hong Kong =

Period of governance of Hong Kong

The 2nd term Chief Executive of Hong Kong relates to the period of governance of Hong Kong following the handover of Hong Kong, between 1 July 2002 and 30 June 2007. There were two Chief Executives of Hong Kong during this period:

- The second administration of Tung Chee-Hwa, who occupied the post from 1 July 2002 until his resignation on 12 March 2005;
- The first administration of Donald Tsang, who was elected on 25 June 2005 to fill the position vacated by Tung.
