= HKGolden50 =

- Formation: June 2011
- Type: NGO
- Location: Hong Kong
- Website: www.hkgolden50.org

HKGolden50 (Chinese: 香港黃金五十) is a small policy research organisation in Hong Kong. It claims to be "non-political, non-profit, independent" although its prime mover is Franklin Lam. a former member of the Executive Council of Hong Kong. The group publishes research reports on perceived opportunities and bottlenecks in Hong Kong. The research team consists of Lam and nine post-80s members.

== History ==
Lam, a former UBS property analyst and fund manager, founded the organisation in June 2011.

== Activities ==
Research findings have been published in the local print media, The team has been interviewed on local radio and its findings have been picked up by local television news.

HKGolden50 also disseminates its research findings through lectures and discussions at professional associations, governmental and non-governmental institutions, as well as community talks open to the general public.

== Research ==
HKGolden50 has published several reports:

- Hong Kong - The Golden 5 Years and the Decline that may follow...? (Chinese: 香港黃金五年﹕盛衰關鍵)
- How to become a World City: Lessons from London (Chinese: 實現香港潛能 躍升國際都會：借鏡倫敦)
- How to Invest $100bn for Our Future (Chinese: 如何為我們的將來投資一千億)
- How to Create A World-Class Medical System (Chinese: 如何建立世界級醫療系統)
