= Franklin Lam =

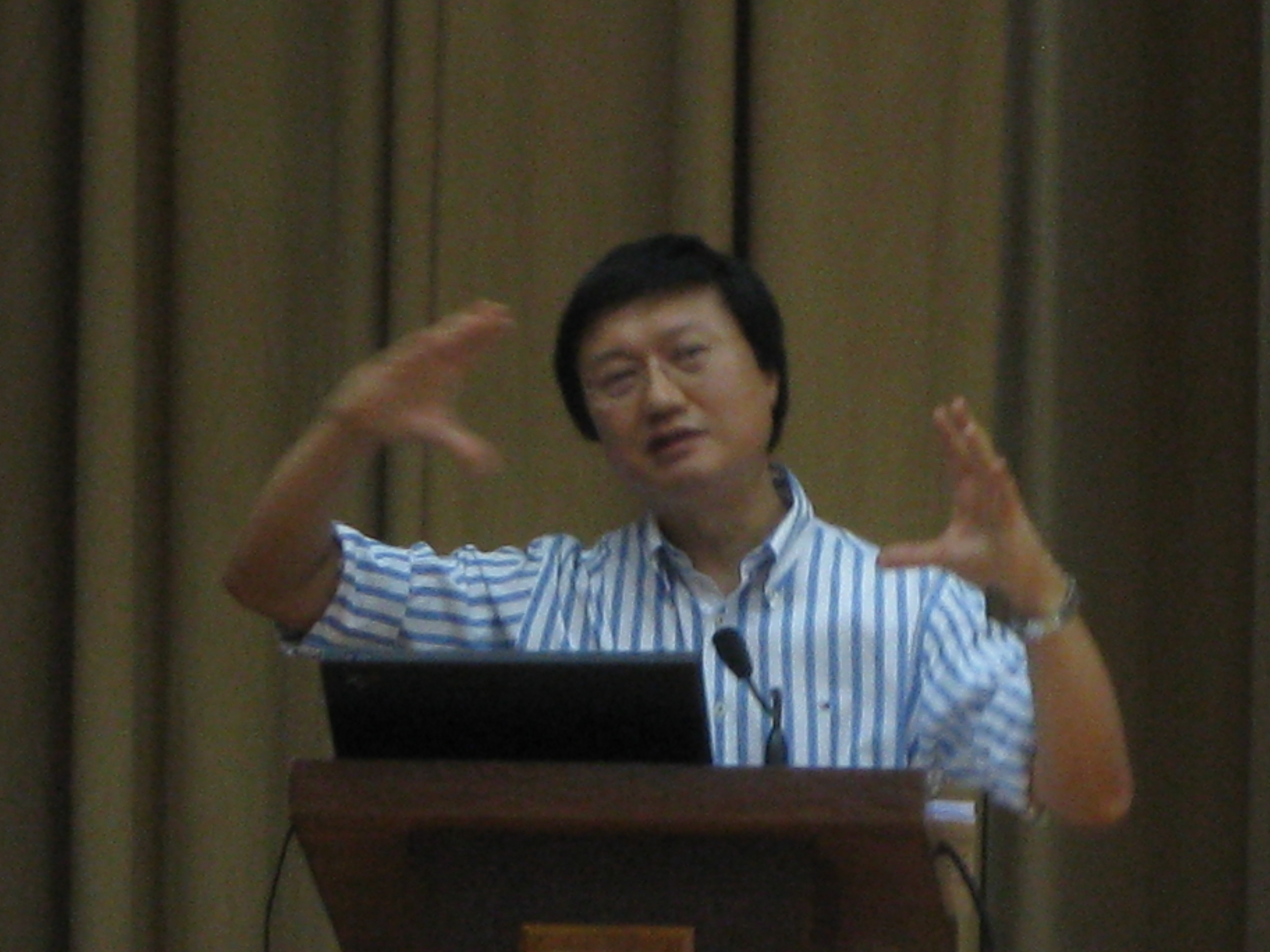
Franklin Lam in a symposium 201109

Franklin Lam Fan-keung (born 1961 in Hong Kong) is a former non-official member of the Executive Council of Hong Kong and an accountant.

== Background ==
Lam obtained his bachelor's degree in Economics from University of Manchester. During the 1997 Asian financial crisis, he served as part of the Central Policy Unit. In 2000, he was equities managing director at UBS Investment Bank in Hong Kong, that is, a property analyst and fund manager. Lam became a director in Global Asset Management in 2006. After leaving UBS in 2011, he founded HKGolden50, a small policy research organisation.

== Honours and memberships ==
Lam is a member of the Institute of Chartered Accountants in England and Wales.
