= First Tsang government =

2005–2007 administration of Hong Kong

First Donald Tsang Government
- 2nd Government of the Hong Kong; Special Administrative Region

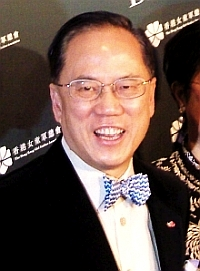
- Date formed: 25 June 2005
- Date dissolved: 30 June 2007

People and organisations
- Head of state: Hu Jintao
- Head of government: Donald Tsang
- No. of ministers: 14
- Member parties: DAB, LP, FTU, TA
- Status in legislature: Pro-Beijing majority
- Opposition party: Pan-democracy camp

History
- Election: 2005 Chief Executive election
- Legislature term: 3rd Legislative Council
- Predecessor: Second Tung government
- Successor: Second Tsang government

The first term of Donald Tsang as chief executive of Hong Kong, officially considered part of "The 2nd term Chief Executive of Hong Kong", relates to the period of governance of Hong Kong since the transfer of sovereignty over Hong Kong, between 25 June 2005 and 30 June 2007. Former civil-servant Donald Tsang was elected on 25 June 2005 to fill the position vacated by the resignation of his predecessor, Tung Chee Hwa.

== Election ==
Donald Tsang who resigned from his Chief Secretary for Administration was the only candidate, he was declared elected unopposed on 16 June. Nonpartisan legislator Chim Pui-chung and Democratic Party chairman Lee Wing-tat failed to secure the minimum number of 100 nominations to enter the race. Before the election, controversies sparked as the Standing Committee of the National People's Congress interpreted Article 53 that the term of office of the new Chief Executive shall be the remainder of the previous Chief Executive but not the new term.

== Cabinet ==
=== Ministry ===
Portfolio	Minister	Took office	Left office	Party
Chief Executive	Donald Tsang	30 June 2005	30 June 2007	Nonpartisan
Chief Secretary for Administration	Rafael Hui	30 June 2005	30 June 2007	Nonpartisan
Financial Secretary	Henry Tang	30 June 2005	30 June 2007	Nonpartisan
Secretary for Justice	Elsie Leung	1 July 1997	19 October 2005	Nonpartisan
Secretary for Justice	Wong Yan-lung	20 October 2005	Tsang II	Nonpartisan
Secretary for the Civil Service	Joseph Wong	1 July 2002	23 January 2006	Nonpartisan
Secretary for the Civil Service	Denise Yue	24 January 2006	Tsang II	Nonpartisan
Secretary for Commerce, Industry and Technology	John Tsang	5 August 2003	23 January 2006	Nonpartisan
Secretary for Commerce, Industry and Technology	Joseph Wong	24 January 2006	30 June 2007	Nonpartisan
Secretary for Constitutional Affairs	Stephen Lam	1 July 2002	Tsang II	Nonpartisan
Secretary for Economic Development and Labour	Stephen Ip	1 July 2002	30 June 2007	Nonpartisan
Secretary for Education and Manpower	Arthur Li	1 July 2002	30 June 2007	Nonpartisan
Secretary for the Environment, Transport and Works	Sarah Liao	1 July 2002	30 June 2007	Nonpartisan
Secretary for Financial Services and the Treasury	Frederick Ma	1 July 2002	30 June 2007	Nonpartisan
Secretary for Health, Welfare and Food	York Chow	12 October 2004	Tsang II	Nonpartisan
Secretary for Home Affairs	Patrick Ho	1 July 2002	30 June 2007	Nonpartisan
Secretary for Housing, Planning and Lands	Michael Suen	1 July 2002	30 June 2007	Nonpartisan
Secretary for Security	Ambrose Lee	5 August 2003	Tsang II	Nonpartisan

=== Executive Council non-official members ===
The Executive Council was expanded with adding 8 new non-official members to the Executive Council, which balanced the ratio of composition to 14 official members (3 secretaries of the department and 11 secretaries of the bureaux) and 15 non-official members.

Members	Affiliation	Portfolio	Took Office	Left Office	Ref
CY Leung	Nonpartisan	Non-official Convenor of the ExCo; Chartered surveyor	1 July 1997	Tsang II	
Andrew Liao	Nonpartisan	Former deputy judge of High Court	1 July 2002	Tsang II	
Jasper Tsang	DAB	Legislative Councillor	1 July 2002	Tsang II	
Cheng Yiu-tong	FTU	General secretary of FTU	1 July 2002	Tsang II	
Selina Chow	Liberal	Legislative Councillor	22 September 2003	Tsang II	
Laura Cha	Nonpartisan	Non-executive deputy chairman of HSBC	19 October 2004	Tsang II	
Bernard Chan	Alliance	Businessman and politician	26 October 2004	Tsang II	
Ronald Arculli	Nonpartisan	Chairman of HKEx	1 November 2005	Tsang II	
Charles Lee	Nonpartisan	Former chairman of HKEx and director of Cheung Kong Holdings	1 November 2005	Tsang II	
David Li	Nonpartisan	CEO of Bank of East Asia and Legislative Councillor	1 November 2005	Tsang II	
Leong Che-hung	Nonpartisan	Former Chairman of Hospital Authority	1 November 2005	Tsang II	
Marvin Cheung	Nonpartisan	Former Chairman of Airport Authority	1 November 2005	Tsang II	
Henry Fan	Nonpartisan	Managing director of CITIC Pacific	1 November 2005	Tsang II	
Victor Lo	Nonpartisan	CEO of Gold Peak Industries	1 November 2005	Tsang II	
Anthony Cheung	Nonpartisan	President of the Hong Kong Institute of Education	1 November 2005	Tsang II	

== First term ==
=== Food safety ===
After 80% of fish from mainland China was found to contain malachite green, forcing many fish stalls to close, fishermen and businessmen criticised the Tsang administration for acting too slowly. Subsequently, the approval rating of Tsang and his administration fell in polls.

Fearing H5N1 bird flu would come back to Hong Kong one day, Tsang announced that free fresh chicken sale would be replaced by a system of central slaughtering starting from 2009. A slaughter house will be built in Sheung Shui.

=== Relations with pan-democrats ===
On 30 August 2005, Tsang announced that the Guangdong Provincial Government invited all 60 members from the Legislative Council to visit Guangdong between 25 September to 26 September 2005. This was the first chance for most of the pro-democrats such as Martin Lee to visit the mainland China since 1989.

Tsang has talked of discriminatory treatment of political parties and politicians, describing their relationships with him as either intimate or distant. This is what is known as the policy of friend-or-foe dichotomy (親疏有別). In June 2008, through praising Frederick Ma, the former Secretary for Commerce and Economic Development, for his even-handedness with all political parties, pan-democratic politicians landed an indirect attack at Tsang's style. Tsang explained that he had been quoted out of context. He explained in the Legislative Council that what he meant was he would "stay close" to what was representative of mainstream public opinions, and "stay away" from what was against mainstream public opinions.

=== Political reform ===
On 30 November, he televised appeal for support on the electoral reform package. Opposing the package publicly, thousands of Hong Kong people demanding immediate universal suffrage (63,000 as reported by the police, 81,000 - 98,000 by HKU-POP research team, at least 250,000 by the organisers) demonstrated against the reform package four days later. It was clear that Tsang would not change the reform package which was supported by about 60% of the population.

On 21 December, the Legislative vetoed his reform proposal as the government failed to get support from more than two-thirds of the councillors. Some lawyers in Beijing said that if the problem can't be solved, Donald Tsang has the power to dissolve the Legco under the Basic Law. He angered democrats, who voted down his proposals, when he referred to them as "horrid animals".

=== Economic policies ===
Henry Tang introduced the Goods and Services Tax (GST) to the public in early 2006. Despite public opposition and opposition from all pro-Beijing and pan-democracy parties, Tsang publicly supported the GST in September 2006. The plan for the tax was shelved unexpectedly on 5 December 2006, prior to the end of the planned consultation period.

Besides, Tsang announced that the Government no longer adopted the positive non-intervention policy in September 2006, further harming the relations between the Liberal Party and the government. He said the term had never reflected the policies of the government accurately. He is of the view that "Big Market, Small Government" is a more accurate description of the way Hong Kong operates.

=== Environment ===
Tsang has been criticised for not doing enough to improve Hong Kong's environment. In recent years high air pollution levels have been an increasing concern for people in Hong Kong, with pollutants from factories and power stations in China's industrial hinterland mixing with the fumes of the region's growing fleet of vehicles and wafting into the city on prevailing winds. The city has fallen in the rankings in several quality of life indices and there are worries that foreign firms will relocate to cleaner cities such as Singapore and Kuala Lumpur. Concerns over the pollution's effect on public health and the tourism industry are also rising. In mid-2006 Tsang launched the "Action Blue Sky Campaign" and outlined a comprehensive plan to tackle air pollution in Hong Kong and in collaboration with the neighbouring Guangdong province. Scepticism however remained among the expatriate and local population of Hong Kong and, in late November 2006, they ridiculed Tsang for citing the long life expectancy of Hong Kong residents as evidence of Hong Kong's high quality of life relative to other major cities in the East Asian region.

== See also ==
- Second term of Tung Chee-hwa as Chief Executive of Hong Kong
- Second term of Donald Tsang as Chief Executive of Hong Kong

Preceded by Tung II	Government of Hong Kong; 2005–2007	Succeeded by Tsang II
