= Second Tung government =

2002–2005 administration of Hong Kong

Second Tung Chee-hwa Government
- 2nd Government of the Hong Kong; Special Administrative Region

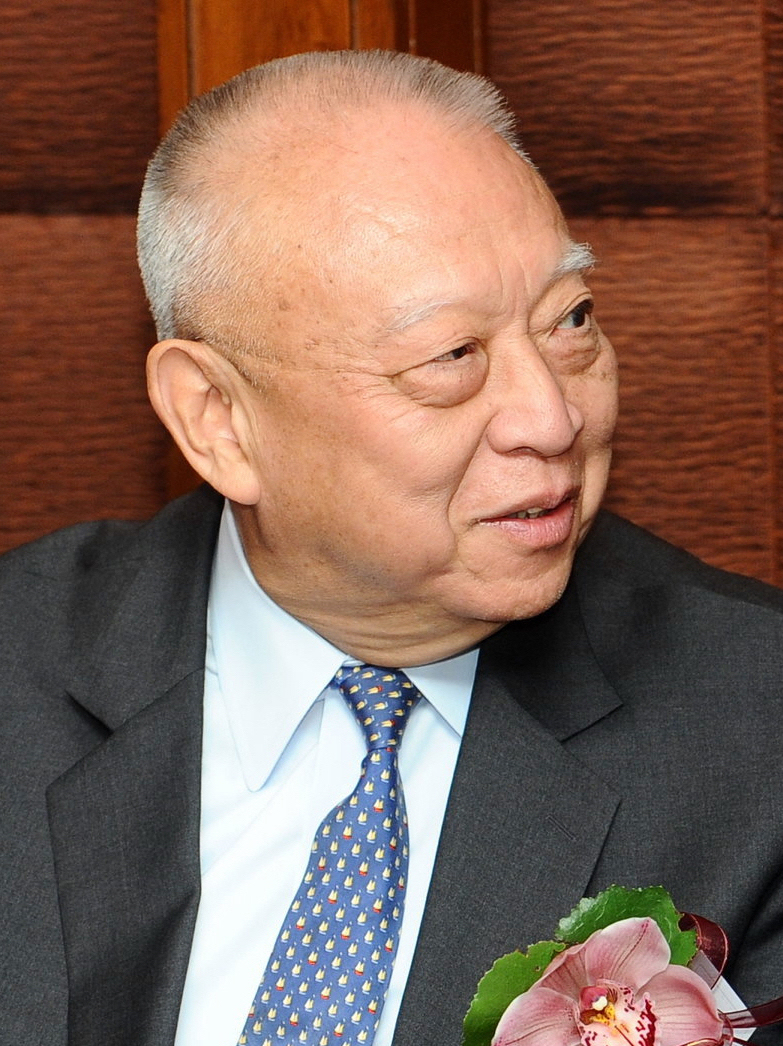
- Date formed: 1 July 2002
- Date dissolved: 12 March 2005

People and organisations
- Head of state: Jiang Zemin (until 2003); Hu Jintao (since 2003)
- Head of government: Tung Chee-hwa
- No. of ministers: 14
- Member parties: DAB, LP, FTU, TA
- Status in legislature: Pro-Beijing majority
- Opposition party: Pro-democracy camp

History
- Election: 2002 Chief Executive election
- Legislature terms: 2nd Legislative Council; 3rd Legislative Council
- Predecessor: First Tung administration
- Successor: First Tsang administration

The Second term of Tung Chee-hwa as Chief Executive of Hong Kong, officially considered part of "The 2nd term Chief Executive of Hong Kong", relates to the period of governance of Hong Kong since the handover of Hong Kong, between 1 July 2002 and 12 March 2005 until Tung Chee-hwa resigned from the office and the rest of the term was taken up by former Chief Secretary for Administration Donald Tsang.

== Election ==
Incumbent Tung Chee-hwa was nominated by the 800-member Election Committee (EC) without contest despite his declining popularity. The pro-democracy camp argued that the electoral process was deliberately designed to obstruct any challenge to Tung.

== Cabinet ==
Under the Principal Officials Accountability System introduced by Tung Chee-hwa in July 2002, there were 3 Secretaries of Department and 11 Directors of Bureau. Under the new system, all heads of bureaux became members of the Executive Council, and came directly under the Chief Executive instead of the Chief Secretary or the Financial Secretary.

=== Ministry ===
Two major officials under serve criticisms resigned during the political crisis in July 2003: Financial Secretary Antony Leung resigned in July after the "Lexusgate" scandal and Secretary for Security Regina Ip after the controversial Hong Kong Basic Law Article 23 legislation.

Cabinet members
Portfolio	Minister	Took office	Left office	Party
Chief Executive	Tung Chee-hwa	1 July 2002	12 March 2005	Nonpartisan
Chief Secretary for Administration	Donald Tsang	1 May 2001	31 May 2005	Nonpartisan
Financial Secretary	Antony Leung	1 May 2001	16 July 2003	Nonpartisan
Financial Secretary	Henry Tang	5 August 2003	Tsang I	Nonpartisan
Secretary for Justice	Elsie Leung	1 July 1997	Tsang I	Nonpartisan
Secretary for the Civil Service	Joseph Wong	1 July 2002	Tsang I	Nonpartisan
Secretary for Commerce, Industry and Technology	Henry Tang	1 July 2002	3 August 2003	Nonpartisan
Secretary for Commerce, Industry and Technology	John Tsang	5 August 2003	Tsang I	Nonpartisan
Secretary for Constitutional Affairs	Stephen Lam	1 July 2002	Tsang I	Nonpartisan
Secretary for Economic Development and Labour	Stephen Ip	1 July 2002	Tsang I	Nonpartisan
Secretary for Education and Manpower	Arthur Li	1 July 2002	Tsang I	Nonpartisan
Secretary for the Environment, Transport and Works	Sarah Liao	1 July 2002	Tsang I	Nonpartisan
Secretary for Financial Services and the Treasury	Frederick Ma	1 July 2002	Tsang I	Nonpartisan
Secretary for Health, Welfare and Food	Yeoh Eng-kiong	1 July 2002	11 October 2004	Nonpartisan
Secretary for Health, Welfare and Food	York Chow	12 October 2004	Tsang I	Nonpartisan
Secretary for Home Affairs	Patrick Ho	1 July 2002	Tsang I	Nonpartisan
Secretary for Housing, Planning and Lands	Michael Suen	1 July 2002	Tsang I	Nonpartisan
Secretary for Security	Regina Ip	1 July 2002	24 July 2003	Nonpartisan
Secretary for Security	Ambrose Lee	5 August 2003	Tsang I	Nonpartisan

=== Executive Council non-official members ===
The Executive Council was headed by Chief Executive and with total of 19 members: 3 secretaries and 11 directors of the bureaux as official members and 5 non-official members. All non-official members except for Convenor Leung Chun-ying was newly appointed by Tung Chee-hwa.

Tung allied himself with the Democratic Alliance for the Betterment of Hong Kong (DAB) and the Liberal Party, by appointing chairmen of the Liberal Party and DAB, James Tien and Jasper Tsang Yok-sing to the Executive Council to form a "ruling alliance."

On 5 July 2003, James Tien resigned from the ExCo to show objection to the legislation of Hong Kong Basic Law Article 23, after more than 500,000 people marched on 1 July. Tung later on appointed Selina Chow, also from the Liberal Party to replace Tien.

In October 2004, Tung appointed two additional non-official members to the Executive Council.

Members	Affiliation	Portfolio	Took Office	Left Office	Ref
CY Leung	Nonpartisan	Non-official Convenor of the ExCo; Chartered surveyor	1 July 1997	Tsang I	
Jasper Tsang	DAB	Legislative Councillor	1 July 2002	Tsang I	
Cheng Yiu-tong	FTU	General secretary of FTU	1 July 2002	Tsang I	
Andrew Liao	Nonpartisan	Former deputy judge of High Court	1 July 2002	Tsang I	
James Tien	Liberal	Legislative Councillor	1 July 2002	5 July 2003	
Selina Chow	Liberal	Legislative Councillor	22 September 2003	Tsang I	
Laura Cha	Nonpartisan	Non-executive deputy chairman of HSBC	19 October 2004	Tsang I	
Bernard Chan	Alliance	Businessman and politician	26 October 2004	Tsang I	

== See also ==
- First term of Tung Chee-hwa as Chief Executive of Hong Kong
- First term of Donald Tsang as Chief Executive of Hong Kong

Preceded by Tung I	Government of Hong Kong; 2002–2005	Succeeded by Tsang I
