= Hong Kong Mercantile Exchange =

- Type: Privately held company
- Location: Hong Kong SAR, China
- Key people: Barry Cheung, Chairman

Hong Kong Mercantile Exchange (Chinese: 香港商品交易所; abbreviated as HKMEx) was an electronic commodities exchange established in Hong Kong for the trading of commodity futures, options and other financial derivatives. The exchange was originally pitched as a platform to trade oil futures. In fact, it ended up trading mainly silver and gold futures.

The exchange provided standardised, cleared, and exchange-traded products on a transparent pricing platform to the Asia-Pacific time zone. It was created to eliminate market liquidity risks associated with Asian market participants trading in faraway commodities exchanges such as New York and London.

On 18 May 2013, the exchange ceased to trade upon surrendering its authorisation to provide automated trading services. The Hong Kong Police made a series of arrests in connection with the exchange, and its chairman, Barry Cheung was sentenced to four years in prison over his role in the exchange.

== History ==
The exchange was announced at a Hong Kong press conference on 25 June 2008 by chairman Barry Cheung Chun-yuen. In attendance was Hong Kong Financial Secretary John Tsang who said there is "a huge opportunity for Hong Kong to develop a commodities futures market" in Hong Kong. In March 2009, HKMEx appointed Albert Helmig, a former vice-chairman of NYMEX, as President of the exchange to lead day-to-day operations of the bourse.

The exchange positioned itself as a trading forum located in Hong Kong, a jurisdiction entirely open to the free movement of capital and market participation by non-domiciled investors, while at the same time offering international market participants access to the booming mainland Chinese commodities market. However, the China Securities Regulatory Commission denied authorisation to any offshore exchange to set up commodities futures delivery business. It was not a full brokerage, but was licensed by the Hong Kong Securities and Futures Commission (SFC) for automated trading services.

In June 2009, HKMEx and LCH.Clearnet agreed initial terms for LCH.Clearnet to provide clearing for the exchange. In September 2009, HKMEx signed a contract with Hong Kong International Airport to use HKIA's Precious Metals Depository as a licensed storage venue for gold traded on the exchange.

In December 2009, ICBC (Asia) acquired a 10% equity stake in the company, and said it intends to participate extensively in the exchange's operations as a trading and clearing member, as well as a settlement bank. This was followed by a June 2010 announcement that En+ Group, owned by Russia's Oleg Deripaska, had also purchased a 10% equity interest.

On 18 May 2011, HKMEx formally began trading with a US dollar gold futures contract. In an interview with Reuters, Helmig said it plans to launch gold and silver futures contracts denominated in renminbi. He also said HKMEx will follow precious metals products with contracts in base metals, and then energy and agriculture. On 22 July 2011, the exchange launched a second product, a US Dollar silver futures contract. Its headquarters were at Cyberport, occupying over 47,000 square feet.

As of 5 pm on 13 February 2012, trading on HKMEx's gold and silver futures reached 1,003,210 contracts, representing total turnover of over US$50 billion (around HK$390 billion). Trading on the exchange's US-dollar gold futures for the first time surpassed the 10,000 contract mark on 4 June 2012.

On 2 August 2012, the exchange appointed Jane Wang and William Barkshire as co-presidents, following the retirement of Albert Helmig.

== Collapse ==
On 18 May 2013, the exchange surrendered its authorisation to provide automated trading services, citing insufficient revenue to support its operating expenses. The exchange had been experiencing low trading volumes amidst competition from rivals in other countries and its financial reserves were depleted. The firm had announced it intended to issue HK$780 million worth of shares in March 2013, but had postponed it until June. There had also been rumours that, prior to the shut-down, Chairman Barry Cheung had obtained a loan of HK$100 million from a "major property businessman and supporter" of Chief executive Leung Chun-ying. New World Development chairman Henry Cheng denied he nor his firm had ever "had any financial and business dealing" with either the HKMEx or Cheung. Mr. Cheung said that HKMEx would reapply for the licence after the business is recapitalised after its rights issue June.

On 21 May 2013, the Hong Kong Securities and Futures Commission announced it was investigating "suspected irregularities in [HKMEx] financial affairs" and that it was referring the matter to the Hong Kong Police. As of 25 May 2013, at five people had been arrested in connection with events connected to the exchange, including the alleged possession of false financial instruments. Cheung was sentenced to four years imprisonment on conviction of fraud and conspiracy to defraud, a conviction which was upheld on appeal.

The collapse of HKMEx had political implications for the Hong Kong government, as its chairman Barry Cheung, held a number of senior government positions and is closely identified with HK chief executive CY Leung. Cheung took leave of absence from his official duties. He since resigned not only from his government posts, but also from several private company boards.

== See also ==
- List of futures exchanges
- List of traded commodities
