= Chief Executive of Hong Kong =

Head of the government of Hong Kong

Chief Executive of the Hong Kong Special Administrative Region
- 香港特別行政區行政長官
- Emblem of Hong Kong

- Flag of Hong Kong

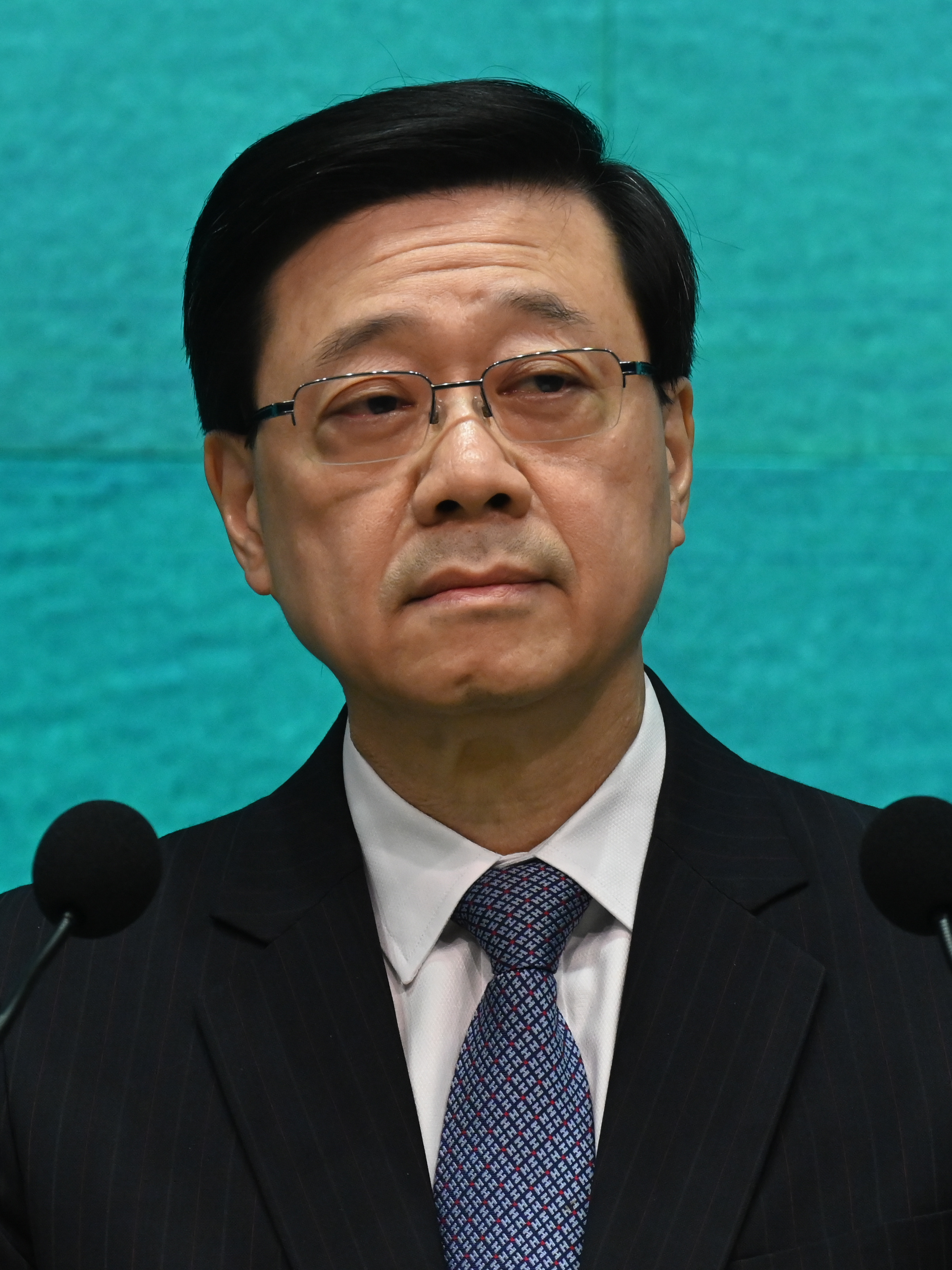
- Incumbent; John Lee Ka-chiu since 1 July 2022
- Government of Hong Kong; Office of the Chief Executive
- Style: Chief Executive (特首) (informal); The Honourable (尊貴的) (formal)
- Type: Head of government
- Member of: Executive Council; Committee for Safeguarding National Security
- Reports to: Central Leading Group on Hong Kong and Macau Affairs
- Residence: Government House
- Nominator: Election Committee
- Appointer: State Council of China (Decree signed by Premier)
- Term length: 5 years; Re-electable for another maximum 5-year term consecutively
- Constituting instrument: Hong Kong Basic Law
- Inaugural holder: Tung Chee-hwa
- Formation: 1 July 1997; 29 years ago
- Salary: HK$5,630,000
- Website: ceo.gov.hk/en

Chief Executive of Hong Kong
- Traditional Chinese: 香港特別行政區行政長官
- Simplified Chinese: 香港特别行政区行政长官
Transcriptions
Standard Mandarin
- Hanyu Pinyin: Xiānggǎng Tèbié Xíngzhèngqū Xíngzhèng Zhǎngguān
- Wade–Giles: Hsiang1-kang3 Tʻê4-pieh2 Hsing2-cheng4-chü1 Hsing2-cheng2 Chang3-kuan1
Yue: Cantonese
- Yale Romanization: Hēunggóng Dahkbiht Hàngjingkēui Hàngjing Jéunggūn
- Jyutping: Hoeng1gong2 Dak6bit6 Hang4zing3keoi1 Hang4zing3 Zoeng2gun1
- IPA: [hœ́ŋ.kɔ̌ŋ tɐ̀k̚.pìt̚ hɐ̏ŋ.tsēŋ.kʰɵ́y hɐ̏ŋ.tsēŋ tsœ̌ŋ.kún]

Commonly abbreviated as
- Chinese: 香港特首
Transcriptions
Standard Mandarin
- Hanyu Pinyin: Xiānggǎng Tèshǒu
- Wade–Giles: Hsianf1-kang3 Tʻê4-shou3
Yue: Cantonese
- Yale Romanization: Hēunggóng Dahksáu
- Jyutping: Hoeng1gong2 Dak6sau2
- IPA: [hœ́ŋ.kɔ̌ŋ tɐ̀k̚.sɐ̌u]

The chief executive of the Hong Kong Special Administrative Region is the representative of the Hong Kong Special Administrative Region and head of the Government of Hong Kong.

The position was created to replace the office of Governor of Hong Kong, the representative of the Monarch of the United Kingdom during British colonial rule. The office, as stipulated by the Hong Kong Basic Law, formally came into being on 1 July 1997 with the handover of Hong Kong from the United Kingdom to the People's Republic of China. The chief executive is head of the executive branch of the Hong Kong government.

The functions of the chief executive include nominating principal officials for appointment by the State Council of China, which is headed by the premier, conducting foreign relations, appointing public officers including members of the Executive Council and judges, giving consent to legislation passed by the Legislative Council, and bestowing honours. The chief executive has wide powers under the Basic Law and is required to consult the Executive Council before making most policy decisions. The executive council consists of official and non-official members, including the Chief Secretary for Administration, the most senior official and head of the Government Secretariat, in charge of overseeing the administration of the Government. The Chief Executive holds the title "The Honourable", and ranks first in the Hong Kong order of precedence. The official residence of the chief executive is Government House in Central, Hong Kong Island.

The current chief executive is John Lee selected as chief executive in the 2022 election, appointed by the Chinese State Council with the designation decree signed by Premier Li Keqiang on 30 May 2022 and took office on 1 July 2022. Lee is the fifth chief executive of Hong Kong; three of his four predecessors are still living.

== Eligibility for office ==
According to article 44 of the Basic Law, the chief executive must be a Chinese citizen as defined by the HKSAR Passports Ordinance. The individual must be at least 40 years old, a Hong Kong permanent resident who is a Chinese citizen with right of abode in Hong Kong, and has ordinarily resided in Hong Kong for a continuous period of not less than 20 years. Article 47 further requires that the chief executive be a person of integrity, dedicated to his or her duties. In addition, candidates are ineligible to stand for selection by the Election Committee without first obtaining nominations from one eighth of its total members.

== Selection ==
The specific method for selecting the chief executive is prescribed in Annex I of the Basic Law. The Election Committee shall be composed of 1500 members from the following sectors pursuant to the amended Annex I under the 2021 Hong Kong electoral changes initiated by the National People's Congress. The Election Committee consists of individuals (i.e. private citizens) and representatives of bodies (i.e. special interest groups or corporate bodies) selected or elected by 40 prescribed sub-sectors as stipulated in Annex I to the Basic Law.

=== Election Committee ===
The Election Committee is responsible for the nomination of chief executive candidates and election of the chief executive-elect. Under the 2021 Hong Kong electoral changes initiated by the National People's Congress, each candidate running for chief executive elections is to be nominated by at least 188 members of the Election Committee, before their eligibility is reviewed and confirmed by the Candidate Eligibility Review Committee of the HKSAR. The chief executive-designate is then returned by the Election Committee with an absolute majority.

The Election Committee is now principally elected by body voters. The number of subsectors with individual votes were significantly reduced, together with elimination of mixed individual and body voting:

- Half of seats (150 seats) in Sector III are nominated by members of national professional organisations or filled by ex officio members;
- District Council subsectors were replaced by subsectors consisting of government-appointed representatives of members of Area Committees, District Fight Crime Committees, and District Fire Safety Committees;
- All NPC and CPPCC sectors serve as ex officio EC members; and
- subsectors consisting of grassroot organisations, associations of Chinese Fellow Townsmen, associations of Hong Kong residents in Mainland and Hong Kong members of relevant national organisations were introduced.

Sector	Members
Industrial, commercial and financial sectors	300
The professions	300
Agricultural, labour, religious, Chinese social and townspeople organisations	300
Members of the Legislative Council, representatives of government and mainlanders' organisations	300
HKSAR deputies to the National People's Congress, the National Committee of the Chinese People's Political Consultative Conference, and representatives of Hong Kong members of Chinese national organisations	300
Total	1,500

=== Chief Executive elections ===
Chief Executive candidates must receive nominations by at least 188 members of the Election Committee, with nomination by at least 15 members of each sector of the Election Committee. Candidacy is confirmed upon review and confirmation of eligibility by the Candidate Qualification Review Committee, according to opinions issued by the Committee for Safeguarding National Security of the Hong Kong Special Administrative Region on the basis of a review by the National Security Department of the Hong Kong Police Force on whether a candidate meets the legal requirements and conditions of upholding the Basic Law and swearing allegiance to the HKSAR of the People's Republic of China.

The Chief Executive-designate is then returned by the Election Committee with an absolute majority in a two-round system:

Uncontested election	Contested election	
Election Committee casts votes of support/not support; the chief executive-designate is to be returned with an absolutely majority (>750 valid votes)	Election Committee casts votes for 1 of the candidates; the chief executive-designate is to be returned with an absolute majority (>750 valid votes)	
Election Committee casts votes of support/not support; the chief executive-designate is to be returned with an absolutely majority (>750 valid votes)	If absolute majority won	If absolute majority not won
Election Committee casts votes of support/not support; the chief executive-designate is to be returned with an absolutely majority (>750 valid votes)	Candidate with an absolutely majority of valid votes elected	If: 1. more than 2 candidates obtain the highest and the same no. of votes; or 2. no candidates win an absolute majority; Then: elimination of candidates other than those who obtained the highest number of votes in (1) or candidates with the highest and second highest number of votes in (2); second round(s) of voting conducted, until a candidate with an absolutely majority (>750 valid votes) is elected

The chief executive-designate must publicly disaffiliate with a political party within seven days of the election and must not become a member of a party during their term of office. The chief executive-designate is then appointed by the Central People's Government of the People's Republic of China before taking office.

=== Electoral reform ===
In the first selection of the chief executive, the committee consisted of only 400 members. It was expanded to 800 for the second term. As a result of enabling legislation stemming from a public consultation in 2010, and its approval by the National People's Congress Standing Committee in Beijing, the number of representatives was increased from 800 to 1200. Following the electoral reform initiated by the Chinese government in 2021 to increase mainland-Chinese controls on Hong Kong, the number of representatives was increased to 1500 but most are appointed or ex-officio seats.

=== Term ===
According to article 46 the term of office of the chief executive is five years with a maximum of two consecutive terms. If a vacancy occurs mid-term, the new Chief Executive's first term is for the remainder of the previous Chief Executive's term only. The method of selecting the chief executive is provided under Article 45 and Annex I of the Basic Law, and the Chief Executive Election Ordinance.

== Term of office ==
=== Duties and powers ===
Under the Basic Law the chief executive is the chief representative of the people of Hong Kong and is the head of the government of Hong Kong. The Chief Executive's powers and functions include leading the government, implementing the law, signing bills and budgets passed by the Legislative Council, deciding on government policies, advising appointment and dismissal of principal officials of the Government of Hong Kong to the Central People's Government of China, appointing judges and holders of certain public offices and to pardon or commute sentences. The position is also responsible for the policy address made to the public.

The chief executive's powers and functions are established by article 48 of the Basic Law.

The Executive Council of Hong Kong is an organ for assisting the chief executive in policy-making. The council is consulted before making important policy decisions, introducing bills to the Legislative Council, making subordinate legislation or dissolving the Legislative Council.

=== Resignation ===
Article 52 of the Basic Law stipulates that the Chief Executive must resign when:

- the Chief Executive loses the ability to discharge his or her duties as a result of serious illness or other reasons;
- the Chief Executive refuses to sign a bill passed by a two-thirds majority of a re-elected Legislative Council, after the Legislative Council is dissolved; or
- the Legislative Council refuses to pass the budget or any other important bill for a second time after the Legislative Council is dissolved.

=== Impeachment ===
The Legislative Council has the power to propose a motion of impeachment of the chief executive for decision by the Central People's Government of China, with the following steps as stipulated in article 73(9) of the Basic Law:

- One-fourth of all Legislative Council (LegCo) members can jointly initiate a motion, charging the chief executive with serious breach of law or dereliction of duty;
- the motion for investigation passed by simple majority of votes of each of the two groups of members present; (Note: First Group: Members returned by the Election Committee; Second Group: Members returned by Functional Constituencies and by Geographical Constituencies.)
- the Chief Justice of the Court of Final Appeal is mandated to form and chair an independent investigation committee for carrying out the investigation and reporting its findings to LegCo;
- the independent investigation committee considers the evidence sufficient to substantiate such charges;
- a two-thirds majority of all LegCo members passes the motion of impeachment;
- the motion of impeachment is reported to the Central People's Government of China for decision.

=== Acting and succession ===
The acting and succession line is spelled out in article 53. If the chief executive is not able to discharge his or her duties for short periods (such as during overseas visits), the duties would be assumed by the chief secretary for administration, the financial secretary or the secretary for justice, by rotation, in that order, as acting chief executive. In case the position becomes vacant, a new chief executive would have to be selected.

=== Residence and office ===
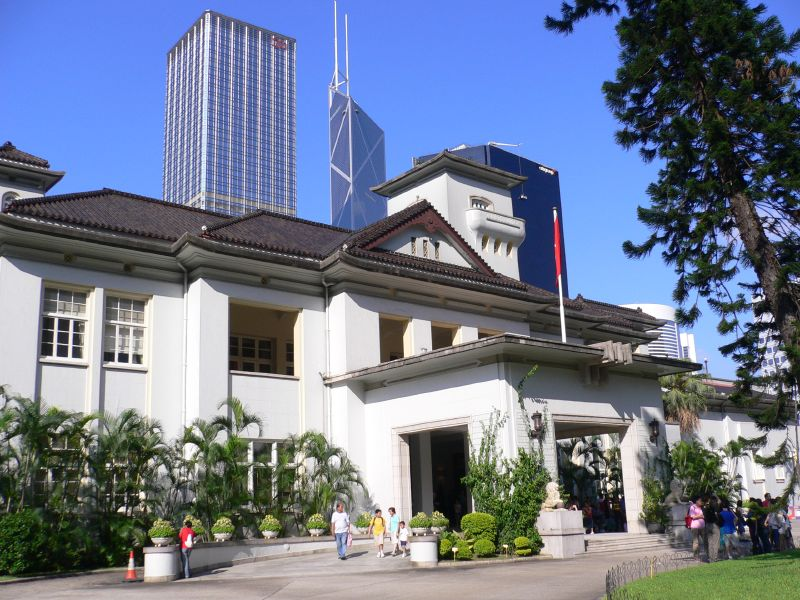
Government House, official residence of the chief executive

Prior to the handover in 1997, the office of the chief executive-designate was at the seventh floor of the Asia Pacific Finance Tower. When Tung Chee-hwa assumed duty on 1 July 1997, the office of the chief executive was located at the fifth floor of the Former Central Government Offices (Main Wing). In the past the governor had his office at Government House. Tung did not use Government House as the primary residence because he lived at his own residence at Grenville House. Donald Tsang decided to return to the renovated Government House during his first term, and moved in on 12 January 2006, for both his office and residence. In 2011, the office of the chief executive moved to the low block of the new Central Government Complex in Tamar. Government House continues to serve as the official residence of the Chief Executive.

== Former chief executives ==
Upon retirement, former Chief Executives have access to office space at the Office of Former Chief Executives, 28 Kennedy Road. The office provides administrative support to former Chief Executives to perform promotional, protocol-related, or any other activities in relation to their former official role. The activities include receiving visiting dignitaries and delegations, giving local and overseas media interviews, and taking part in speaking engagements. A chauffeur-driven car is provided to discharge promotional and protocol-related functions.

Depending on police risk assessment, personal security protection is provided. Former Chief Executives also enjoy medical and dental care.

Former Chief Executives hold the title "The Honourable", and rank third in the Hong Kong order of precedence.

== Remuneration ==
Remuneration for the chief executive of Hong Kong is among the highest in the world for a political leader, and only second to that of the prime minister of Singapore. The pay level took a cue from the handsome amounts paid to the city's colonial governors – worth $273,000 per annum plus perks in 1992.

In 2005, Tung Chee Hwa received some HK$3 million ($378,500) in pay as Chief Executive. From 2009 until the end of 2014, the salary for the job stood at HK$4.22 million. In January 2015, Leung Chun-Ying reversed a pay freeze imposed in 2012, resulting in its increase to HK$4.61 million ($591,000).

In July 2017, directors of bureaux (DoBs) were approved to have a 12.4% pay rise and the 3.5% pay differential between secretaries of departments (SoDs) and DoBs remained, indicating a new annual pay of approximately HK$5 million for the city's leading role because the Chief Executive received a salary of 112% of the Chief Secretary. The new salary of Chief Executive of Hong Kong is about thirty-nine times more than the annual salary of paramount leader of China.

== Legal immunity ==
In July 2021, Carrie Lam refused to remove the legal immunity of the chief executive in anti-bribery legislation, stating that the officeholder has to be accountable to the Beijing government and hence, extending such provisions to CE would 'sabotage its superior constitutional status'. She was accused of positioning herself above the law whilst going against the principles of separation of power and rule of law.

== List of Chief Executives ==
No.	Portrait	Name	Term of office Duration in years and days		Election	Political alignment	Term (Note: Successive fixed five-year CE terms in which incumbent held office.)	Government (supporting parties)	Appointer (Premier)	Ref.
1		Tung Chee-hwa 董建華 (1937–2026)	1 July 1997	12 March 2005 (Note: Resigned, Chief Secretary for Administration Donald Tsang served as acting chief executive from 12 March to 25 May 2005 and Financial Secretary Henry Tang acted from 25 May to 21 June 2005.)	1996	Pro-Beijing	1	Tung I (DAB • LP)	Li Peng	
1		Tung Chee-hwa 董建華 (1937–2026)	1 July 1997	12 March 2005	2002	Pro-Beijing	2	Tung II (DAB • FTU • LP • TA)	Zhu Rongji	
1		Tung Chee-hwa 董建華 (1937–2026)	7 years and 255 days		2002	Pro-Beijing	2	Tung II (DAB • FTU • LP • TA)	Zhu Rongji	
2		Donald Tsang 曾蔭權 (born 1944)	21 June 2005	30 June 2012	2005	Pro-Beijing	2	Tsang I (DAB • FTU • LP • TA)	Wen Jiabao	
2		Donald Tsang 曾蔭權 (born 1944)	21 June 2005	30 June 2012	2007	Pro-Beijing	3	Tsang II (DAB • LP • FTU • TA • ES)	Wen Jiabao	
2		Donald Tsang 曾蔭權 (born 1944)	7 years and 10 days		2007	Pro-Beijing	3	Tsang II (DAB • LP • FTU • TA • ES)	Wen Jiabao	
3		Leung Chun-ying 梁振英 (born 1954)	1 July 2012	30 June 2017	2012	Pro-Beijing	4	Leung (DAB • FTU • BPA • NPP • LP)	Wen Jiabao	
3		Leung Chun-ying 梁振英 (born 1954)	5 years and 0 days		2012	Pro-Beijing	4	Leung (DAB • FTU • BPA • NPP • LP)	Wen Jiabao	
4		Carrie Lam 林鄭月娥 (born 1957)	1 July 2017	30 June 2022	2017	Pro-Beijing	5	Lam (DAB • BPA • FTU • LP • NPP)	Li Keqiang	
4		Carrie Lam 林鄭月娥 (born 1957)	5 years and 0 days		2017	Pro-Beijing	5	Lam (DAB • BPA • FTU • LP • NPP)	Li Keqiang	
5		John Lee 李家超 (born 1957)	1 July 2022	Incumbent	2022	Pro-Beijing	6	Lee (DAB • FTU • BPA • NPP • LP)	Li Keqiang	
5		John Lee 李家超 (born 1957)	4 years and 75 days		2022	Pro-Beijing	6	Lee (DAB • FTU • BPA • NPP • LP)	Li Keqiang	

=== Age-related statistics ===
#	Chief Executive	Born	Age at start of tenure	Age at end of tenure	Post-tenure timespan	Lifespan	
#	Chief Executive	Born	Age at start of tenure	Age at end of tenure	Post-tenure timespan	Died	Age
1	Tung Chee-hwa	7 Jul 1937	59 years, 359 days 1 Jul 1997	67 years, 248 days 12 Mar 2005	21 years, 180 days	8 September 2026	89 years, 63 days
2	Donald Tsang	7 Oct 1944	60 years, 257 days 21 Jun 2005	67 years, 267 days 30 Jun 2012	14 years, 75 days	(Living)	81 years, 341 days
3	Leung Chun-ying	12 Aug 1954	57 years, 324 days 1 Jul 2012	62 years, 322 days 30 Jun 2017	9 years, 75 days	(Living)	72 years, 32 days
4	Carrie Lam	13 May 1957	60 years, 49 days 1 Jul 2017	65 years, 48 days 30 Jun 2022	4 years, 75 days	(Living)	69 years, 123 days
5	John Lee	7 Dec 1957	64 years, 206 days 1 Jul 2022	69 years, 205 days 30 Jun 2027	(Pending)	(Living)	68 years, 280 days

== See also ==
- List of spouses of chief executives of Hong Kong
- Chief Executive of Macau
- Governor of Hong Kong
- Politics of Hong Kong
