= Executive Council of Hong Kong =

Cabinet of the Government of Hong Kong

Coordinates: 22.281487°N 114.165089°E

- Traditional Chinese: 行政會議
- Simplified Chinese: 行政会议
Transcriptions
Standard Mandarin
- Hanyu Pinyin: Xíngzhèng Huìyì
Yue: Cantonese
- Yale Romanization: Hàhng jing wuih yíh
- Jyutping: Hang4 zing3 wui6 ji5

Pre-handover name
- Chinese: 行政局
Transcriptions
Standard Mandarin
- Hanyu Pinyin: Xíngzhèngjú
Yue: Cantonese
- Yale Romanization: Hàhng jing guhk
- Jyutping: Hang4 zing3 guk6

The Executive Council of Hong Kong (ExCo) is the cabinet of the Government of Hong Kong, acting as a formal body of advisers to the Chief Executive of Hong Kong that serves as a core policy-making organ assisting the chief executive. It is analogous to other Executive Councils in the Commonwealth such as the Federal Executive Council of Australia, the Executive Council of New Zealand, and the Privy Council of the United Kingdom.

Under the presidency of the chief executive, the executive council consists of 21 Official Members (the most senior of these being the Chief Secretary of Hong Kong, head of the Government Secretariat and chair of the Policy Committee), and 16 Non-official Members (also known as ministers without portfolio who are normally leading legislators from pro-establishment political parties) headed by the Convenor of the Non-official Members. The Council normally meets once a week.

== History ==
The executive council was set up by the British Hong Kong Government. The first ex officio members were the Colonial Secretary and the Colonial Treasurer in the 1840s. The Attorney General was added in the 1850s. In 1949, the Executive Council had five ex officio members: the senior military officer (Commander of British Forces Overseas), the colonial secretary, the attorney general, the secretary for Chinese affairs and the financial secretary; the Commissioner of Labour, while an 'official' was not an ex officio member. In addition, there were six 'unofficial members': the chief manager of the Hongkong and Shanghai Banking Corporation, the Tai-Pan of Jardines, a solicitor, two barristers, and a physician.

In 1994 the title 'Senior Member' or 'Senior Unofficial Member' was changed to 'Convenor', when Lydia Dunn was succeeded in the post by Rosanna Wong.

The format of the executive council was retained after the transfer of sovereignty in 1997 until a ministerial system (named Principal Officials Accountability System or POAS) was introduced in 2002, Tung Chee Hwa's second term of office. Since then all secretaries are political appointees and have to leave the civil service. All secretaries are appointed to the council, transforming the council effectively into a cabinet. Non-official members are minorities in the council, and are like ministers-without-portfolio. The position of convenor was abolished.

In fulfilling his election platform, Chief Executive Sir Donald Tsang appointed eight new non-official members the day after delivering his first policy address on 12 October 2005. Secretaries of bureaux would sit in meetings of the Council when the agenda was related to their portfolio, and the position of convenor was restored. It was presented as a move to re-strengthen the role of the council as a link with the community.

=== Change in composition ===
Year	Number of Official Members exclusive of the Chief Executive	Number of Non-official Members
1997	3	11
2002	14	5
2004	14	7
2005	14	15
2007	15	16
2008	15	15
2009	15	16
2012	15	14
2012	15	16
2013	15	14
2015	15	15
2015	16	14
2015	16	16
2016	16	16
2017	16	15
2017	16	16
2022	21	16

== Functions ==
The executive council is to advise the chief executive in policy-making and the administration of the government. The chief executive acting after consultation with the executive council is known as Chief Executive in Council.

Under Article 54 of the Basic Law, the chief executive must consult the executive council before making important policy decisions, introducing bills to the Legislative Council, making delegated legislation, regulating certain public institutions, or dissolving LegCo. The chief executive in council also hears appeals and objections under certain Ordinances. A Chief Executive rejecting a majority opinion of the Executive Council is required to put the specific reasons for the rejection on record.

== Composition ==
The members of Executive Council are appointed by the Chief Executive from among principal officials (heads of department, informally called "ministers"), members of Legislative Council, and public figures. Their appointment and removal is decided by the Chief Executive. There is no fixed term of office, but the term of office of members cannot extend beyond the expiry of that of the chief executive who appoints them (Article 55 of the Basic Law).

The council is presided over by the Chief Executive. In addition to the 21 principal officials there are 16 Non-official members. Other than the Chief Secretary, Financial Secretary and Secretary for Justice, official members only sit in meetings that are related to their portfolio. In accordance with the Oaths and Declarations Ordinance, the members of the Executive Council should take the Oath of Fidelity after his/her appointment and promise not to reveal any matters being discussed in the council. The aim of this principle was to ensure that the members could speak freely without any fears and pressure, so as to facilitate the chief executive to receive prompt and objective advices in the policy making process.

The following list includes all members of the executive council in the order of precedence:

- Note: To avoid confusion, all the names on this list follow the Hong Kong convention (English name <if available>, family name, Chinese given name <if available>) for consistency.

Capacity	Portrait	Member	Affiliation	Portfolio	Assumed office	Born in	Ref
President		John Lee	Nonpartisan	Chief Executive	1 July 2022	1957	
Official		Eric Chan	Nonpartisan	Chief Secretary for Administration	1 July 2022	1959	
Official		Paul Chan	Nonpartisan	Financial Secretary	16 January 2017	1955	
Official		Paul Lam	Nonpartisan	Secretary for Justice	1 July 2022	1967/1968	
Official		Warner Cheuk	Nonpartisan	Deputy Chief Secretary for Administration	1 July 2022	1959	
Official		Michael Wong	Nonpartisan	Deputy Financial Secretary	1 July 2022	1962	
Official		Horace Cheung	Nonpartisan	Deputy Secretary for Justice	1 July 2022	1974	
Official		Janice Tse	Nonpartisan	Secretary for Constitutional and Mainland Affairs	30 March 2026	1965	
Official		Christopher Hui	DAB	Secretary for Financial Services and the Treasury	20 April 2020	1977	
Official		Chris Tang	Nonpartisan	Secretary for Security	25 June 2021	1965	
Official		Tse Chin-wan	Nonpartisan	Secretary for Environment and Ecology	1 July 2022	1957/1958	
Official		Algernon Yau	Nonpartisan	Secretary for Commerce and Economic Development	1 July 2022	1958/1959	
Official		Lo Chung-mau	Nonpartisan	Secretary for Health	1 July 2022	1960/1961	
Official		Bernadette Linn	Nonpartisan	Secretary for Development	1 July 2022	1963/1964	
Official		Winnie Ho	Nonpartisan	Secretary for Housing	1 July 2022	1964/1965	
Official		Ingrid Yeung	Nonpartisan	Secretary for the Civil Service	1 July 2022	1964/1965	
Official		Christine Choi	Nonpartisan	Secretary for Education	1 July 2022	1966/1967	
Official		Dong Sun	Nonpartisan	Secretary for Innovation, Technology and Industry	1 July 2022	1966/1967	
Official		Alice Mak	FTU	Secretary for Home and Youth Affairs	1 July 2022	1970	
Official		Chris Sun	Nonpartisan	Secretary for Labour and Welfare	1 July 2022	1971/72	
Official		Mable Chan	Nonpartisan	Secretary for Transport and Logistics	1 July 2022	1961/1962	
Official		Rosanna Law	Nonpartisan	Secretary for Culture, Sports and Tourism	1 July 2022	1963	
Non-official		Regina Ip	NPP	Non-official Convenor of the Executive Council; Former Member of the Legislative Council; Chairperson of New People's Party	1 July 2017	1950	
Non-official		Arthur Li	Independent	Former Vice Chancellor of Chinese University of Hong Kong; Member of the committee for the Basic Law of the HKSAR under the NPCSC	1 July 2012	1945	
Non-official		Jeffrey Lam	BPA	Former Member of Legislative Council; Vice-chairman of BPA	17 October 2012	1951	
Non-official		Tommy Cheung	Liberal	Former Member of Legislative Council; Chairman of Liberal Party	25 November 2016	1949	
Non-official		Martin Liao	Independent	Former Member of Legislative Council	25 November 2016	1957	
Non-official		Joseph Yam	Independent	Executive Vice President of the China Society for Finance and Banking	1 July 2017	1948	
Non-official		Ronny Tong	PoD	Senior Counsel; Convenor of Path of Democracy	1 July 2017	1950	
Non-official		Lam Ching-choi	Independent	Chairman of the Elderly Commission	1 July 2017	1960	
Non-official		Kenneth Lau	BPA	Member of Legislative Council; Chairman of Heung Yee Kuk	1 July 2017	1966	
Non-official		Moses Cheng	Independent	Chairman of the council of the Hang Seng University of Hong Kong; Chancellor of the Hong Kong Sheng Kung Hui	1 July 2022	1949/1950	
Non-official		Margaret Leung	Independent	Treasurer of the University of Hong Kong	1 July 2022	1952	
Non-official		Chan Kin-por	Independent	Former Member of the Legislative Council	1 July 2022	1954	
Non-official		Eliza Chan	Independent	Member of the National Committee of CPPCC	1 July 2022	1956/1957	
Non-official		Ko Wing-man	Independent	Former Secretary for Food and Health	1 July 2022	1957	
Non-official		Stanley Ng	FTU	Member of the Legislative Council	1 July 2022	1970	
Non-official		Gary Chan	DAB	Member of the Legislative Council	1 July 2022	1976	

== List of the past Executive Councils ==
- 1896–1941: List of Executive Council of Hong Kong unofficial members 1896–1941
- 1946–1997: List of Executive Council of Hong Kong unofficial members 1946–1997
- 1997–2002: First term of Tung Chee-hwa as Chief Executive of Hong Kong
- 2002–2005: Second term of Tung Chee-hwa as Chief Executive of Hong Kong
- 2005–2007: First term of Donald Tsang as Chief Executive of Hong Kong
- 2007–2012: Second term of Donald Tsang as Chief Executive of Hong Kong
- 2012–2017: CY Leung as Chief Executive of Hong Kong
- 2017–2022: Carrie Lam as Chief Executive of Hong Kong

== Location ==
The executive council meets in the Lower Block of the Central Government Complex, Tamar. Until 2012, ExCo met in the Main Wing of the Central Government Offices on Government Hill, in Central and below Government House (former residence of the British Governor of Hong Kong).

Prior to the Handover, the Provisional Executive Council of Hong Kong, headed by Tung Chee Hwa, met in Shenzhen or Tung's office on the 11th floor of the Asia Pacific Finance Tower in Hong Kong. Members of the outgoing British Hong Kong ExCo were not permitted to attend this body.

Both Executive Council meetings were on Tuesdays.

== See also ==
- Legislative Council of Hong Kong
- Politics of Hong Kong
- United Front (China)
- United Front Work Department
- Unofficial members of the Hong Kong Executive Council
