= Andrew Liao =

Non-official Member of the Executive Council
- In office 2002–2017
- Appointed by: Tung Chee-hwa; Donald Tsang; CY Leung

Personal details
- Education: Ying Wa College
- Alma mater: University of Hong Kong (LLB); London School of Economics (LLM)

Andrew Liao Cheung-sing, GBM GBS SC JP (Chinese: 廖長城; Hong Kong), is a Hong Kong barrister. He was a Non-official Member of the Executive Council of Hong Kong from 2002 to 2017. Martin Liao, a barrister and prominent pro-establishment politician, is his younger brother.

== Education ==
Liao studied at Ying Wa College, where he was head boy. He graduated in 1972 with an LLB from the University of Hong Kong, where he was a member of the first LLB cohort. He later earned an LLM in intellectual property from the London School of Economics.

== Career ==
Liao was called to the Bar in England and Hong Kong in 1974 and 1975 respectively, and subsequently in Victoria and the Australian Capital Territory in 1984. He took silk in Hong Kong in 1989, and was admitted as an Advocate and Solicitor in Singapore in 1990. Liao served as a Deputy Judge of the High Court in 1990 and as a Recorder of the Court of First Instance of the High Court in 2000.

Liao was a member of the Law Reform Commission's Copyright Sub-committee, which was appointed in 1987 to review Hong Kong copyright law. He later served as the first chairman of the Copyright Tribunal.

In 2011, Liao was appointed chairman of the Advisory Committee on Review of the Patent System in Hong Kong. The committee recommended in 2012 that Hong Kong establish an original grant patent system for standard patents.

In 2013, Liao was appointed vice-chairman of the Working Group on Intellectual Property Trading. The group released a report in 2015 on the development of Hong Kong as an intellectual property trading hub.

In 2015, Liao was appointed Council Chairman of the Hong Kong University of Science and Technology and served for 8 years, subsequently becoming Chairman of the University Court after leaving office as Council Chairman.

== Honours and awards ==
- 2001: Silver Bauhinia Star (SBS)
- 2008: Gold Bauhinia Star (GBS)
- 2022: Grand Bauhinia Medal (GBM)
