= Healthcare in Hong Kong =

Overview of the health care system in Hong Kong

Hong Kong's medical infrastructure consists of a mixed medical economy, with 12 private hospitals and 43 public hospitals. Hong Kong has high standards of medical practice. It has contributed to the development of liver transplantation, being the first in the world to carry out an adult to adult live donor liver transplant in 1993. Both public and private hospitals in Hong Kong have partnered with the Australian Council on Healthcare Standards (ACHS) for international healthcare accreditation. There are also polyclinics that offer primary care services, including dentistry.

The Li Ka Shing Faculty of Medicine of the University of Hong Kong and Faculty of Medicine of The Chinese University of Hong Kong are the two major tertiary institutions nurturing medical professionals in Hong Kong. Every year, over 200 medical undergraduates complete their studies and join the medical workforce. For postgraduate medical education, The Hong Kong Academy of Medicine is an independent institution with the statutory power to organise, monitor, assess and accredit all medical specialist training and to oversee the provision of continuing medical education in Hong Kong. In addition, The Royal College of Physicians and Surgeons of Canada has also accredited the postgraduate medical education (1994–present) in Hong Kong and allowed these graduates from the Hong Kong Academy of Medicine seeking RCPSC Certification and practising in Canada.

A study published in 2016 found that around 8% of the population had avoided seeing a doctor because they couldn't afford to.

== Staffing ==
Hong Kong has about 1.9 doctors per 1000 people, which is the same ratio as in Taiwan. Of the over 14,600 doctors in Hong Kong, about 60% work in private practice and the remaining 40% work in the public service. The majority of doctors in Hong Kong, graduated from one of the 2 local medical schools. There are over 1,200 doctors in Hong Kong that graduated from medical schools outside of Hong Kong and passed the rigorous Hong Kong licensing requirements including an examination. These doctors, represented by the Licentiate Society, are known as Licentiates of the Medical Council of Hong Kong (LMCHK). In addition, there are a few hundred colonial doctors; a legacy of the pre-1997 era in which said doctors graduated from medical schools of Commonwealth origin and were automatically given full registration to practice. There are over 7400 registered practitioners of Traditional Chinese medicine.

== Public healthcare ==
Subsidised treatment, with small co-payments, is available to people with a Hong Kong identity card and to resident children under the age of 11. Between 2007 and 2011 public spending on healthcare increased by 30%. In 2014/5, it was about 17% of all government expenditure. Emergency medical services, used by around 2.2 million each year, costs HK$400 per patient since January 2026.

=== Hospital Authority ===
The Hospital Authority is a statutory body established on 1 December 1990 under the Hospital Authority Ordinance to manage all 42 public hospitals and institutions in Hong Kong. It is mainly responsible for delivering a comprehensive range of secondary and tertiary specialist care and medical rehabilitation through its network of health care facilities. The Authority also provides some primary medical services in 74 primary care clinics.

Hong Kong has only two comprehensive medical faculties, the Li Ka Shing Faculty of Medicine, University of Hong Kong and the Faculty of Medicine, Chinese University of Hong Kong, and they are also the sole two institutes offering medical and pharmacy programs. Other healthcare discipline programs are dispersed among some other universities which do not host a medical faculty.

== Private healthcare ==
There are 12 private hospitals in Hong Kong. The government has proposed a Voluntary Health Insurance Scheme in order to encourage more use of the private sector.

== Voluntary Health Insurance Scheme (VHIS) ==
=== Background ===
The Voluntary Health Insurance Scheme (VHIS) is one of the major medical healthcare reforms proposed by the government. In Hong Kong, the public and private sectors complement each other under a well-established dual-track healthcare system. However, there is an increasing imbalance between the two sectors. Public hospitals take up more than 88% of in-patient services with heavy government subsidies. Due to aging population, the rising demand of citizens on good quality healthcare service provision and escalating medical costs, the recurrent expenditure of the government on medical and health care services increased continuously, from $32 billion in 2007 to $52 billion in 2014. With such huge demand on public medical services, the quality of healthcare provided would inevitably be affected by the heavy workload of the medical staff and proportionally less medical resources per person. Thus, the government proposed the VHIS to recalibrate the balance between public and private healthcare systems by encouraging more well-off citizens, especially the middle-class, to use the private healthcare services as an alternative. Thus, the public sector can focus on providing services in its target areas, thereby enhancing the long-term sustainability of the dual-track healthcare system.

The scheme requires the insurance companies to fulfill 12 minimum requirements and private hospitals to disclose the charges of common medical procedures so as to increase transparency and enhance customers' protection. The government has pointed out that this scheme is not intended as a wholesome solution to the existing problems, but just one of the measures to take forward the reform. The VHIS has already undergone three stages of public consultation since 2008. It will be launched earliest by 2017 if consensus can be reached among the public.

=== Policy Development Process ===
==== The Harvard Report (1999) ====
The Health and Welfare Bureau (predecessor of the Food and Health Bureau (FHB)) appointed scholars from the Harvard University to conduct a research on the financing and organisation of health care in Hong Kong. A report titled "Improving Hong Kong's Healthcare System: Why and for Whom?" was published. While they suggested that Hong Kong had an equitable and efficient healthcare system, there was insufficient oversight on the system. The report also raised doubt on the long-term financial sustainability of the system. The report suggested that, in the short run, the government should adopt a two-tier mandatory health insurance scheme consisting of the "Savings Account for Long Term Care (MEDISAGE)" and "Health Security Plan (HSP)", which require both employers' and employees' contribution. Also, the "Competitive Integrated Health Care Option" should be adopted in the long run. It refers to the establishment of a Health Security Fund to pay a standard payment rate to public or private healthcare provider chosen by a patient, thereby realising the principle of 'money follows the patient'. Under the plan, Government funding would not automatically go to the public health sector.

Consultation was conducted alongside the publication of the Harvard Report. But it was shelved due to public resentment.

==== Consultation: The Life Long Investment Document (2000) ====
The document rejected the HSP proposed by the Harvard Report. A mandatory medical savings scheme called Health Protection Accounts (HPA). The proposal requires individuals aged 40 to 64 to contribute 1 to 2 percent of his earnings to a personal account to cover both the individual and his/her spouse's medical expenses after retirement. However, this consultation was also shelved due to public resentment.

==== Discussion paper "Building a Healthy Tomorrow" (2005) ====
The discussion paper was issued by the Health and Medical Development Advisory Committee (HMDAC). Recommendations on different aspects of the future service delivery model were made. It foretells that the Advisory Committee will proceed with discussion on the possible financing options and will bring forth relevant recommendation early 2006.

==== First Stage Public Consultation on Health care Reform: 'Your Health Your Life' (2008) ====
Based on the recommendations by the HMDAC, the government conducted the first consultation on healthcare reform in March to June 2008. The three-month consultation aimed at collecting public views on general health care reform in two areas. First, the four service reform proposals, namely (i) enhance primary care; (ii) promote public-private partnership; (iii) develop electronic health record sharing; and (iv) strengthen public healthcare safety net. Second, the six possible supplementary healthcare financing options, including (i) social health insurance; (ii) out-of-pocket payments; (iii) medical savings accounts; (iv) voluntary private health insurance; (v) mandatory private health insurance; and (vi) personal healthcare reserve (a combination of (iii) and (v)). Some pros and cons of the six proposals, and the underlying societal values they represent were spelt out, with the aim to assist the public in their expression of preferences.

A total of 4900 written submissions were received. The consultation report was published in December 2008. It suggested that there was a broad consensus over the service reforms. However, there were divergent views on the supplementary financing options, no single option commanded majority support, though private PHI shows a relatively higher preference. It was also shown from the response that the public embraced five societal values, namely, individual need, voluntary participation, equity, freedom to choose and employer's responsibility. The FHB undertook to formulate a detailed proposal based on these public preferences to launch the second-stage public consultation.

==== Second Stage Consultation: 'My Health My Choice' (2010) ====
The second stage consultation on health care reform was launched in October 2010 to January 2011. In this consultation, the government aimed at soliciting public views on the design of the government-regulated but privately operated Voluntary Health Protection Scheme (VHPS) providing standardised health insurance. In addition, the government pledged to earmark $50 billion from the fiscal reserve to finance the scheme, opinion was sought on how this fund should be allocated.

The consultation report was published in July 2011. Subsequent to the consultation, the FHB proposed a three-pronged action plan, including (i) review healthcare manpower strategy by setting up the Steering Committee on Strategic Manpower Review; (ii) Formulate a supervisory framework and propose financial incentives for the HPS by setting up a working group under the HMDAC; and (iii) facilitate healthcare service developments, like develop essential infrastructure and promote packaged services.

==== Government Consultant Report (2013) ====
The private consultant PricewaterhouseCoopers Service Limited was hired by the FHB to review on the current private health insurance system, as well as to provide suggestions to the implementation of the HPS.

==== Third Stage Consultation: Voluntary Health Insurance Scheme (VHIS) (2014) ====
This consultation lasted from December 2014 to April 2015. To better reflect the objectives and nature of the scheme, it was renamed to "VHIS". The government proposed the '12 minimum requirements' of the standard insurance plans in the VHIS, aiming at (i) Improving accessibility to and continuity of health insurance (ii) enhancing the quality of insurance protection; and (iii) promoting transparency and certainty. In addition, a "high risk pool (HRP)" mechanism was proposed, so that individuals of high risk and have pre-existing medical conditions will also be able to purchase the health insurance. A total of 600 written submissions were received.

==== Latest Development ====
The public consultation report has been completed but yet to be published. The government admitted that the HRP mechanism was the most contentious issue in the public consultation, and further exploration and consultation is required. In April, 2016, the government said that legislation work was underway.

In December 2016, the government announced the decision to drop three controversial features temporarily, the HRP, and two of the "12 minimum requirements" - guaranteed acceptance and portable insurance policy. The government is confident that the remaining ten minimum requirements would be implemented by next year through the Insurance Authority's issuance of guidelines to the insurance sector. It is estimated that the dropped features will be implemented in the next stage through legislation, probably after two to three years.

=== Organisation ===
The Food and Health Bureau (FHB) was responsible for the formulation and implementation of the Voluntary Health Insurance Scheme (formerly known as Health Protection Scheme). After the second public consultation in 2010, the Healthcare Planning and Development Office (HPDO) was set up under the Bureau, in order to 'take forward the healthcare reform initiatives'.

In the period from 2012 to 2014, a Working Group and a Consultative Group were set up under the Health and Medical Development Advisory Committee (HMDAC). Both groups were consisted of a chairman, non-official and ex-officio members. The Working Group was chaired by the Permanent Secretary of the Food and Health Bureau, the most senior civil servant in the Bureau. Meanwhile, the Consultative Group was chaired by the head of the Healthcare Planning and Development Office in the FHB. While the Working Group has the responsibility to formulate the details of the policy, the Consultation Group gives suggestions to the Working Group. In terms of membership, the two groups are composed of civil servants, medical and other professionals.

==== Electronic health records ====
The Electronic Health Record Sharing System is a government-led, opt-in and free of charge program launched since Mar 2016 for sharing of health records of citizens in both public and private healthcare sectors in Hong Kong. The operation of the system and uses of data in the system are governed by the existing and a specific Electronic Health Record Sharing System Ordinance including allergies, adverse drug reactions, diagnosis, procedures, medications, appointments, clinical note, birth records, immunisation, laboratory and radiological reports...etc. in standardised format are shared among healthcare providers for providing healthcare with the citizens' expressed consent and under the need-to-know principle. Records can be shared among public and private sectors; hospitals and clinics; specialists and GPs across institutional boundaries. eHRSS aims to facilitate high quality of healthcare and new models of care delivery and it serves an important tool to support the Public and Private Partnership Programs and Healthcare Reform in Hong Kong.

=== Controversies ===
==== Medical Sector ====
The Hong Kong Medical Association expressed concerns on the effectiveness of VHIS regarding the sustainability of the scheme, scheme attractiveness to the youngsters, patients' right and customers' choice. They specifically emphasised their doubt on the high-risk pool as the use of $50 billion earmarked reserve was not made clear in the consultation paper. They also urged the government to set up an independent regulatory agency to regulate the VHIS and establish a proper mechanism to monitor the appropriateness of premium loading by insurance policyholders in VHIS migration. For public sectors, the Hospital Authority supports the proposed VHIS but they would like the government to address the challenges in manpower and capacity planning. For private sectors, the Hong Kong College of Pediatricians and the Hong Kong Private Hospitals Association expressed their support on the scheme but they urged the government to revamp the private healthcare facilities before the implementation of VHIS. Also, they expressed worries over the transparency of medical fees, especially the disclosure of historical pricing which was largely determined by doctors.

==== Insurance and Business Sector ====
The Hong Kong Federation of Insurers has great divergences on the fundamental operating principles with the government in the scheme. They believe that the suggested premium level at $3600 is unrealistic and misleading, because it fails to take into account the effect of medical inflation. The one-off funding to the HRP and Guaranteed Acceptance is insufficient and unsustainable without the government's long-term commitment. In addition, there are several uncertainties, such as the lack of proper definition of high risk and the transparency of medical fee by the hospitals. The Hong Kong Women Professional & Entrepreneurs Association has strong reservation towards the proposed VHIS as they think the scheme is not favorable to the majority middle class in Hong Kong. The VHIS is not cost effective to induce citizens to purchase, specifically to the young generation. The Institute of Financial Planners of Hong Kong questioned the effectiveness of risk pooling with a voluntary scheme and the coordination with private healthcare sectors if there is no effective control on costs and quality of services.

==== Other Sectors ====
1000 residents were interviewed in a survey co-organised by the Radio Television Hong Kong and the Public Opinion Programme. More than 40% of the respondents supported the VHIS and 22% of them opposed to the scheme. This survey revealed that citizens are willing to support the scheme under the condition that the government resolves the ambiguity in policy implementation.

The New People's Party shared the same view. They requested the government to tighten the regulation on the private medical sector by amending the existing legislation. The Equal Opportunities Commission and the Consumer Council also voiced their concerns. The former questioned about the premium loadings under anti-discrimination principles, suggesting that patients with certain illness should not be excluded. While the latter raised queries over the availability of choices for customers, and the need to facilitate information transparency by disclosing claim records and benefits schedules online.

== See also ==
- Health in Hong Kong
- Medical education in Hong Kong
- Emergency medical services in Hong Kong
- List of hospitals in Hong Kong
- Auxiliary Medical Service
