= Medical education in Hong Kong =

Modern medical education in Hong Kong started in 1887 with the founding of the Hong Kong College of Medicine for Chinese. Currently, two universities provide MBBS degree for doctors and six universities provide undergraduate degrees in other subjects of health sciences.

== History ==
The Hong Kong College of Medicine for Chinese (Chinese: 香港華人西醫書院) was founded in 1887 by the London Missionary Society, with its first graduate (in 1892) being Sun Yat-sen. Sun following the 1911 Xinhai Revolution, which changed China from an empire to a republic, became president of China. The Hong Kong College of Medicine for Chinese was the forerunner of the School of Medicine of the University of Hong Kong, which started in 1911.

== Medical and healthcare education institutes ==
Institute	Organisation	Undergraduate programmes provided
University of Hong Kong	Li Ka Shing Faculty of Medicine	M.B., B.S. (Bachelor of Medicine & Bachelor of Surgery); Bachelor of Nursing; Bachelor of Pharmacy; Bachelor of Chinese medicine; Bachelor of Biomedical Science
University of Hong Kong	Faculty of Dentistry	Bachelor of Dental Surgery
University of Hong Kong	Faculty of Education	Bachelor of Science in Speech-Language Pathology
The Chinese University of Hong Kong	Faculty of Medicine	M.B., Ch.B. (Bachelor of Medicine & Bachelor of Surgery); Bachelor of Nursing; Bachelor of Pharmacy; Bachelor of Science in Public Health; Bachelor of Chinese medicine; Bachelor of Science in Gerontology; Bachelor of Science in Community Health Practice
Hong Kong Polytechnic University	Faculty of Health and Social Sciences	Bachelor of Science in Physiotherapy; Bachelor of Science in Occupational therapy; Bachelor of Science in Nursing; Bachelor of Science in Mental Health Nursing; Bachelor of Science in Medical laboratory Science; Bachelor of Science in Radiography; Bachelor of Science in Optometry; Bachelor of Science in Applied Ageing Studies; Bachelor of Science in Veterinary Nursing
Hong Kong Polytechnic University	School of Professional Education and Executive Development	Bachelor of Science Scheme in Applied Sciences (with specialism in Health Studies)
Hong Kong Metropolitan University	School of Nursing and Health Studies	Bachelor of Nursing with Honours in General Health Care; Bachelor of Nursing with Honours in Mental Health Care
Hong Kong Baptist University	School of Chinese Medicine	Bachelor of Pharmacy in Chinese Medicine; Bachelor of Chinese Medicine and Bachelor of Biomedical Science
Tung Wah College	Department of Nursing and Health Sciences	Bachelor of Health Science Major in Nursing; Bachelor of Health Science Major in Applied Gerontology
Tung Wah College	Department of Rehabilitation and Social Sciences	Bachelor of Science in Occupational Therapy
Tung Wah College	Department of Medical Science	Bachelor of Medical Science Major in Basic Medical Sciences; Bachelor of Medical Science Major in Forensic Science; Bachelor of Medical Science Major in Medical Laboratory Science; Bachelor of Medical Science Major in Radiation Therapy; Bachelor of Medical Science Major in Veterinary Health Studies
Caritas Institute of Higher Education	School of Health Sciences	Bachelor of Nursing (Honours) Programme; Bachelor of Science (Honours) in Physiotherapy

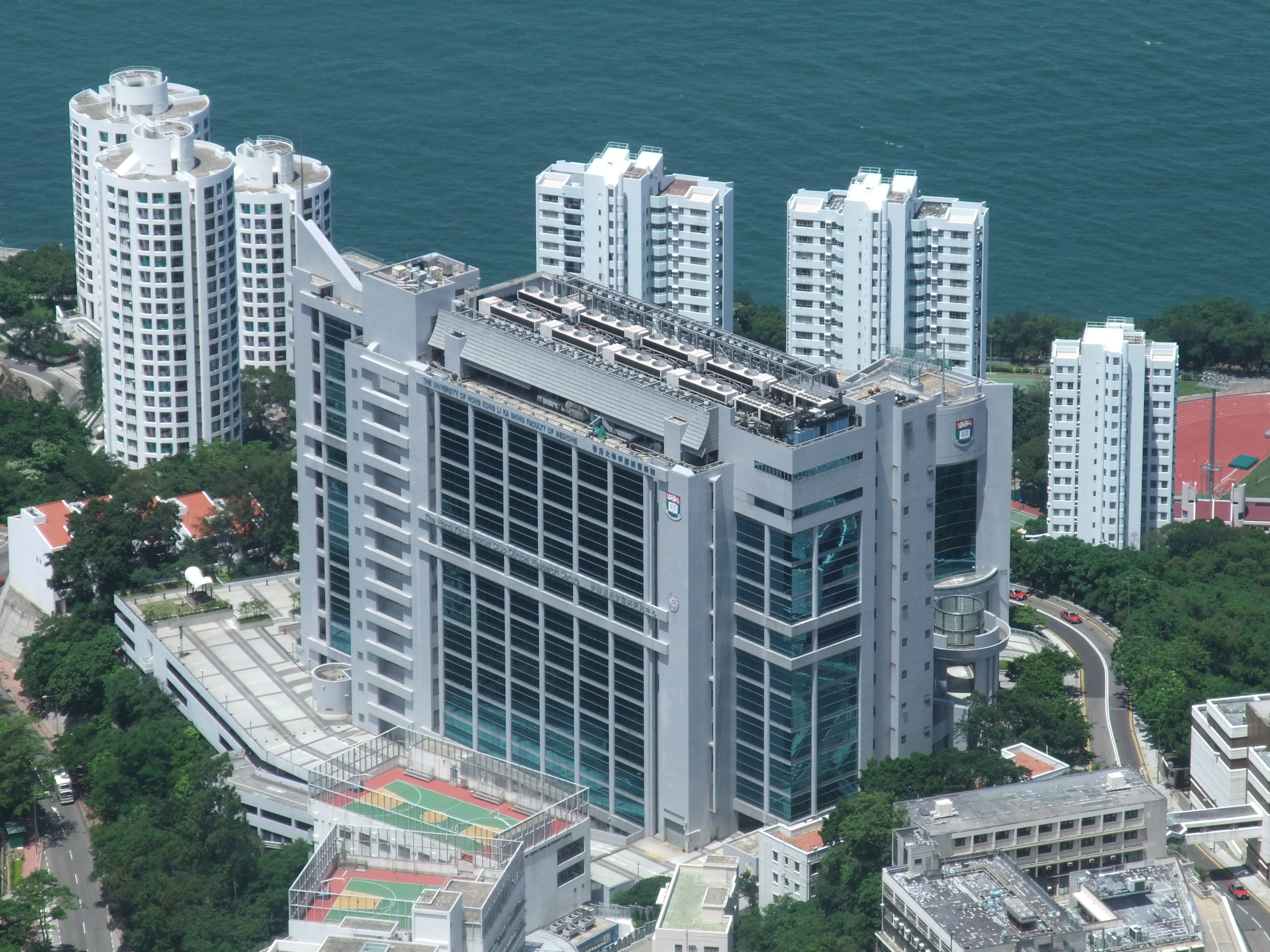
Li Ka Shing Faculty of Medicine, University of Hong Kong

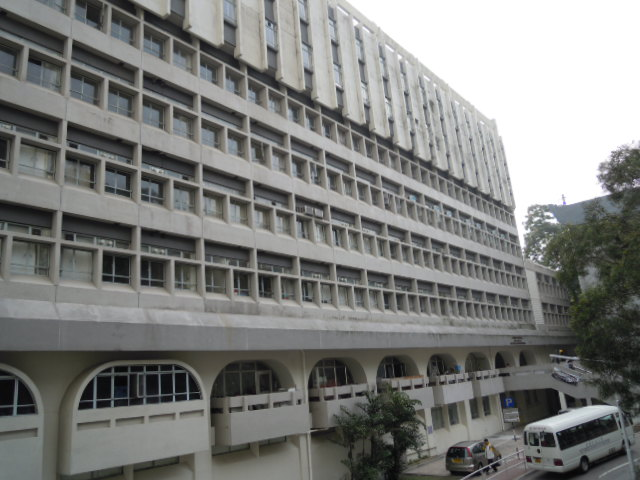
The CHOH MING LI Basic Medical Sciences Building, Chinese University of Hong Kong

The intakes of various healthcare related Bachelor's programmes in Hong Kong are limited.

Hong Kong has only two comprehensive medical faculties, the Li Ka Shing Faculty of Medicine, University of Hong Kong and the Faculty of Medicine, Chinese University of Hong Kong, and they are also the sole two institutes offering pharmacy and six-year medical programmes. Both universities' medical programmes are composed of two parts, two to three years of pre-clinical studies (duration depends on whether the student is a high school graduate or a degree holder pursuing for another degree), and three years of clinical years. Throughout the three years of clinical clerkship, students are rotated in general medicine, surgery, and other specialties. In order to better address Hong Kong's healthcare needs, there have been calls for the creation of a third medical school in Hong Kong.

Other healthcare discipline programmes are dispersed among other universities which do not host a medical faculty.

Various postgraduate courses in different fields of healthcare or biomedical sciences are also provided by those institutes.

In addition to Bachelor program, some education bodies, public hospitals and private hospitals were acknowledged as registered nurse/ enrolled nurse training schools by The Nursing Council of Hong Kong to provide higher diploma programmes or professional diploma programmes, in order to increase manpower of Enrolled Nurses and Registered Nurses in the industry.

Institute	Organisation	Programmes Provided
Queen Mary Hospital		
Queen Elizabeth Hospital	School of Nursing	Higher Diploma in Nursing
Princess Margaret Hospital		
Prince of Wales Hospital		
Caritas Medical Centre	School of Nursing	Higher Diploma in Nursing
Kwong Wah Hospital		
United Christian Hospital		
Hong Kong Sanatorium and Hospital	School of Nursing	Higher Diploma in Nursing (Enrolled Nurses-General) (HD-EN) Programme
Tuen Mun Hospital	School of General Nursing	
Yan Chai Hospital		
HKU School of Professional and Continuing Education, the University of Hong Kong	The College of Life Sciences and Technology	
HKU SPACE Community College, the University of Hong Kong		Higher Diploma in General Nursing (Enrolled Nurses)
St. Teresa’s Hospital	School of Nursing	Higher Diploma in General Nursing (Enrolled Nurse) Programme; Professional Diploma in Nursing
Union Hospital	School of Nursing	Higher Diploma in General Nursing (Enrolled Nurses)
Pamela Youde Nethersole Eastern Hospital		
Hongkong Adventist Hospital and Tsuen Wan Adventist Hospital	Hongkong Adventist School of Nursing	
Hong Kong Baptist Hospital	The School of Nursing	Higher Diploma Nursing Program
The Grantham Hospital		
Haven of Hope Hospital		
Tung Wah Eastern Hospital		
Our Lady of Maryknoll Hospital		
Kowloon Hospital		

== Internship ==
To be registered as medical practitioners, medical graduates must successfully undertake and complete at least one year of supervised practice, generally known as an internship, with satisfactory performance. The internship is undertaken in hospital positions accredited for this purpose.

During this year interns (house officers) are rotated to four specialties (medicine and surgery plus two of obstetrics and gynaecology, paediatrics, orthopaedics and traumatology, emergency medicine, psychiatry or ophthalmology). Each of them lasts three months. There is no work hour limit in Hong Kong and interns are expected to work 80–100 hours per week.

== Non-local medical graduates ==
Prior to the 1997 Handover of Hong Kong, medical degrees from HKU and CUHK were eligible for full registration with the General Medical Council in the UK. However, reciprocality for UK or Commonwealth medical graduates has since been abolished. In order to become a fully registered medical practitioner in Hong Kong, all non-local medial graduates are required to attain a medical license (LMCHK) from the Medical Council of Hong Kong. The rigorous process includes passing a 3-part licentiate examination (HKMLE). In 2017, the Licentiate Society, an independent, non-profit entity, formed to represent the LMCHK and to help meet their professional needs. Medical graduates from HKU and CUHK are exempted from taking the HKMLE.

== Residency ==
After successful completion of medical school, graduates are awarded a provisional registration for their internship year (i.e. the first year of residency). Internship is guaranteed for HKU and CUHK medical graduates and for non-local graduates that have passed the Licentiate Examination. Upon successful completion of the intern year (PGY1), medical graduates are awarded a full registration, and can practice as general practitioners in either the public or private sector. Many, however, choose to pursue specialist training within the Hospital Authority, and enter into a four to six year program, after which they will have attained a specialist registration. Unlike those in the UK or North America, numerous residency programs in Hong Kong remain unfilled after the annual match process, with up to fifty unfilled training posts every year.

== Specialist training ==
Specialist training is only offered at hospitals under the Hospital Authority of Hong Kong. A trainee has to undergo one year of pre-registration internship and four to six years of supervised specialist training and pass in the exit examination or assessment held by Hong Kong Academy of Medicine, which is a statutory body tasked to organise, monitor, assess and accredit all medical and dental specialist trainings in Hong Kong to uphold high professional standard of medical / dental specialists.

Passing the exit examination or assessment is a prerequisite to Fellowship of the Academy. The examinations are all conjoint with the British and Australian royal colleges, e.g. Royal College of Physicians, Australian and New Zealand College of Anaesthetists. For example, a Hong Kong trained general surgeon in Hong Kong will be eligible for FCSHK, FHKAM (General Surgery), FRCS (General Surgery) and FRCS (Edinburgh) while a radiologist will expect to obtain FHKCR, FHKAM (Radiology) and FRCR at the end of their fellowship training. The FHKAM examination focuses on local pathology and also incorporates other components, e.g. logbook evaluation, literature appraisal, teaching, research and annual viva voce that are not included by the Royal College examinations. The pass rate of the FHKAM is similar to that of the Royal College exams, at around 20-60% depending on specialty.

Under the Hong Kong Academy of Medicine, there are 15 colleges offering 73 specialties:

Colleges	Speciality	Years of training
The Hong Kong College of Anaesthesiologists	Anaesthesiology	6 years
The Hong Kong College of Anaesthesiologists	Intensive Care Medicine	6 years
The Hong Kong College of Anaesthesiologists	Pain Medicine	6 years
Hong Kong College of Community Medicine	Community Medicine	
Hong Kong College of Community Medicine	Administrative Medicine	6 years
Hong Kong College of Community Medicine	Public Health Medicine	6 years
Hong Kong College of Community Medicine	Occupational and Environmental Medicine	6 years
The College of Dental Surgeons of Hong Kong	Community Dentistry	6+ years
The College of Dental Surgeons of Hong Kong	Endodontics	6+ years
The College of Dental Surgeons of Hong Kong	Family Dentistry	6+ years
The College of Dental Surgeons of Hong Kong	Oral & Maxillofacial Surgery	6+ years
The College of Dental Surgeons of Hong Kong	Orthodontics	6+ years
The College of Dental Surgeons of Hong Kong	Paediatric Dentistry	6+ years
The College of Dental Surgeons of Hong Kong	Periodontology	6+ years
The College of Dental Surgeons of Hong Kong	Prosthodontics	6+ years
Hong Kong College of Emergency Medicine	Clinical Toxicology	
Hong Kong College of Emergency Medicine	Emergency Medicine	6 years
The Hong Kong College of Family Physicians	Family Medicine	6 years
The Hong Kong College of Obstetricians and Gynaecologists	Obstetrics and Gynaecology	6 years
The Hong Kong College of Obstetricians and Gynaecologists	Gynaecological Oncology	
The Hong Kong College of Obstetricians and Gynaecologists	Maternal and Fetal Medicine	
The Hong Kong College of Obstetricians and Gynaecologists	Reproductive Medicine	
The Hong Kong College of Obstetricians and Gynaecologists	Urogynaecology	
The College of Ophthalmologists of Hong Kong	Ophthalmology	6 years
The Hong Kong College of Orthopaedic Surgeons	Orthopaedics and Traumatology	6 years
The Hong Kong College of Orthopaedic Surgeons	Rehabilitation	
The Hong Kong College of Otorhinolaryngologists	Otorhinolaryngology	6 years
Hong Kong College of Paediatricians	Paediatrics	6 years
Hong Kong College of Paediatricians	Developmental–Behavioural Paediatrics	
Hong Kong College of Paediatricians	Genetics and Genomics (Paediatrics)	
Hong Kong College of Paediatricians	Paediatric Endocrinology	
Hong Kong College of Paediatricians	Paediatric Immunology, Allergy and Infectious Diseases	
Hong Kong College of Paediatricians	Paediatric Neurology	
Hong Kong College of Paediatricians	Paediatric Respiratory Medicine	
Hong Kong College of Paediatricians	Paediatric Haematology and Oncology	
The Hong Kong College of Pathologists	Pathology	6 years
Hong Kong College of Physicians	Anatomical Pathology	
Hong Kong College of Physicians	Chemical Pathology	
Hong Kong College of Physicians	Forensic Pathology	
Hong Kong College of Physicians	Genetic and Genomic Pathology	
Hong Kong College of Physicians	Haematology	
Hong Kong College of Physicians	Immunology	
Hong Kong College of Physicians	Clinical Microbiology and Infection	
Hong Kong College of Physicians	Cardiology	
Hong Kong College of Physicians	Clinical Pharmacology and Therapeutics	
Hong Kong College of Physicians	Critical Care Medicine	
Hong Kong College of Physicians	Dermatology and Venereology	
Hong Kong College of Physicians	Endocrinology, Diabetes, and Metabolism	
Hong Kong College of Physicians	Gastroenterology and Hepatology	
Hong Kong College of Physicians	Genetics and Genomics (Medicine)	
Hong Kong College of Physicians	Geriatric Medicine	
Hong Kong College of Physicians	Haematology and Haematological Oncology	
Hong Kong College of Physicians	Immunology and Allergy	
Hong Kong College of Physicians	Infectious Disease	
Hong Kong College of Physicians	Internal Medicine	
Hong Kong College of Physicians	Medical Oncology	
Hong Kong College of Physicians	Nephrology	
Hong Kong College of Physicians	Neurology	
Hong Kong College of Physicians	Palliative Medicine	
Hong Kong College of Physicians	Respiratory Medicine	
Hong Kong College of Physicians	Rheumatology	
The Hong Kong College of Psychiatrists	Psychiatry	6 years
Hong Kong College of Radiologists	Radiology	6 years
Hong Kong College of Radiologists	Interventional Radiology	
Hong Kong College of Radiologists	Clinical Oncology	6 years
Hong Kong College of Radiologists	Nuclear Medicine	6 years
The College of Surgeons of Hong Kong	Cardio-thoracic Surgery	
The College of Surgeons of Hong Kong	General Surgery	
The College of Surgeons of Hong Kong	Neurosurgery	
The College of Surgeons of Hong Kong	Paediatric Surgery	
The College of Surgeons of Hong Kong	Plastic Surgery	
The College of Surgeons of Hong Kong	Urology	
The College of Surgeons of Hong Kong	Vascular Surgery	

Promotion to a further post, e.g. Associate Consultant, often depends on availability of posts: it is primarily dependent on whether a senior consultant has left for private practice, leaving a vacancy. The salary cap, at the resident level (i.e. Medical Officer), is currently limited to $152,356 HKD per month (at 2016/17 levels). This is exclusive of a 5% housing allowance, and up to 15% gratuity annually, to be released every three years. This has generated an exodus of specialists from the HA to the private sector, and the HA has responded by pledging to promote all specialists to Associate Consultants within 5 years of obtaining specialist qualification. However, this is not a permanent policy and is subject to the government budget. Before the new policy, it was not unusual to see public doctors remaining as 'Medical Officers' more than 10 years after obtaining their specialist qualifications. (1)

Family medicine is recognized as a major specialty in Hong Kong. Specialists in family medicine have undertaken at least six years of accredited training, and earned internationally renowned postgraduate medical qualifications as well as Fellowship of The Hong Kong Academy of Medicine just as their counterparts in hospital medicine or other medical fields.

== Continuing medical education ==
=== Specialists ===
A registered practitioner who wishes to have his/her name included in the Specialist Register of the Medical Council of Hong Kong is required to satisfy the continuing medical education (CME) requirements as stipulated by the Medical Registration Ordinance (Cap 161).

The objective of the CME is to

- maintain, develop or increase the knowledge, skills and competencies relevant to the practice of specialists that may change over the years;
- enhance professional performance to enable the delivery of quality professional care and safe standard of practice to the patients, and public that specialists serve, and;
- ensure that specialists will remain competent throughout their professional career.

The Hong Kong Academy of Medicine requires each specialist to attain a minimum CME requirement of 90 points in a 3-year cycle. A point is equivalent to 1 hour of participation in CME activities. To encourage active learning elements and a balanced mix of different activities, the Academy limits the passive CME points (i.e. points obtained through attending lectures or talks) to 75 points maximum per cycle. Each college of the Academy may recommend additional requirements.

=== Non-specialists ===
The Medical Council of Hong Kong has also implemented a CME programme for practising doctors who are not taking CME for specialists. Enrolment to the programme is on a voluntary basis. The purpose of the programme is to encourage practising doctors to keep themselves up-to-date on current developments in medical practice so as to maintain a high professional standard.

Practising doctors who have accumulated the required minimum credit points per year, i.e. 30 credit points, will be awarded a certificate to certify that they have achieved a satisfactory level of CME activity during a particular period. Such a certificate can be displayed inside the doctor's office. In addition, those practising doctors who have accumulated the required minimum credit points during a three-year cycle, i.e. 90 credit points, will be allowed to use the title "CME certified" on their visiting cards.

== Graduate entry medicine ==
The two medical schools in Hong Kong do not offer such programs and postgraduates have to undergo the same programme as high school graduates. Despite that, postgraduates are increasing in number in local medical schools, now amounting to one fourth of the entire student population. However, graduate entry students may be permitted to enter into the second year of medical school based on their previous major.

== Career structure in the Hospital Authority ==
Rank	HA General Pay Scale Point
Intern	16
Resident	30-44B
Resident Specialist	30-44B
Associate Consultant	45-49
Consultant	50-53A

== See also ==
- Li Ka Shing Faculty of Medicine
- Faculties of Medicines in Hong Kong
