= Licentiate (disambiguation) =

A licentiate is a degree below a PhD granted by universities in some countries; may indicate a medical doctor qualification in the UK and other countries.

Licentiate may also refer to:

== Religion ==
- Licentiate (pontifical degree), second cycle of ecclesiastical academic degrees conferred by pontifical universities and ecclesiastical faculties under the authority of the Holy See.
- Licentiate in Sacred Scripture, Pontifical Degree, Roman Catholic Church
- Licentiate of Canon Law, Roman Catholic Church
- Licentiate of Sacred Theology, Pontifical Degree, Roman Catholic Church
- Licentiate of the Church of Scotland
- Licentiate of Theology, awarded to ordinands and lay theology scholars in the United Kingdom and some Commonwealth countries

== Science and medicine ==
- Licentiate of Dental Surgery, in many countries worldwide
- Licentiate of the Medical Council of Canada, a required certification prior to obtaining a licence to practice medicine
- Licentiate of the Medical Council of Hong Kong, a medical license required of non-local graduates for eligibility to register to practice medicine
- Licentiate of the Royal College of Physicians, in the UK, a former qualification mostly replaced by the Diploma of Membership of the RCP
- Licentiate of the Society of Apothecaries, in the UK, a former qualification for medical doctors in some areas, as well as midwives, dispensaries (pharmacists), etc.
- Medical Licentiate Society of Hong Kong, a non-profit professional association of doctors trained outside of Hong Kong holding said qualification

== Other ==
- Licentiate in Music, Australia
- Licentiate of the Commonwealth Institute of Accountants
- Licentiate of the Royal British Institute of Architects
