= Association of Licentiates of Medical Council of Hong Kong =

Professional medical organisation

The Association of Licentiates of Medical Council of Hong Kong
- 香港醫務委員會執照醫生協會
- Abbreviation: ALMCHK; LMCHK Association 香港執照醫生協會
- Formation: 15 July 1995; 31 years ago
- Type: Non-profit organization, Community Services, Medical Services
- Legal status: non-profit, professional medical organisation
- Location: Tsim Sha Tsui, Hong Kong
- Origins: Hong Kong
- President: Dr. CHEUNG Hon Ming
- Vice-President: Dr. TONG Kai Sing; Dr. LAM Wing Kai; Dr. LUK Wai Sum
- Website: almchk.org.hk

The Association of Licentiates of Medical Council of Hong Kong (ALMCHK) is an non-profit, professional medical organisation established in 1995 representing the licentiate doctors in Hong Kong (LMCHK doctors). It is the first of its kind designated for all non-local graduated licentiate doctors in Hong Kong. Membership are designated to registered doctors in Hong Kong who obtained LMCHK. The primary objective is to safeguard the welfare and rights of licentiates doctors. It is also one the few CME programme providers accredited by the Medical Council of Hong Kong (MCHK).

== Background ==
To be registered and practice medicine in Hong Kong, one must have a medical degree from the local medical faculties or be registered under the Medical Council of Hong Kong.

Before the handover of Hong Kong in 1997, only medical graduates from the Commonwealth countries were exempted from the examination before they could apply for full registration. Doctors from elsewhere were unable to practice medicine in Hong Kong (including mainland China, USA, Canada, etc). Hundreds of medical graduates from mainland China gathered together and raised the issue and fought for the establishment of the licensing examination back in 1977.

After the handover of Hong Kong, all medical graduates who were non-locally trained would have to sit the licensing examination process to attain the full registration in Hong Kong.

Medical practitioners graduates from elsewhere required to go through the licensing examination, held twice a year by the Medical Council of Hong Kong. The licensing examination process consists of examination in professional knowledge (written examination), proficiency test in medical English, clinical examination and undergoing a period of supervised internship at local hospital.

== History ==
The Association of Licentiates of Medical Council of Hong Kong is the first independent, non-profit (Non-company, Registered under Cap. 151 Societies Ordinance), professional medical organisation, designated for all non-local graduated licentiate doctors in Hong Kong, founded in 1995. The association was founded by hundreds of doctors who fought for the establishment of The Hong Kong Medical Licensing Examination back in 1977.

== Purpose ==
- To unite licentiate doctors and safeguard the rights and best interests of licentiate doctors
- Promote academic exchanges with various places and host continuous medical education (CME)
- Provide professional consultation and advice on medical subjects for public

== Mission ==
- Represent the interests of all licentiate doctors, for both private and public sectors, also for both general practitioners and specialists.
- Promote friendship among licentiates and maintain the highest standard of practice and professionalism of the licentiate community through various activities and organising Continuing Medical Education (CME) lectures.
- Promote public-private partnership, primary healthcare and public education through close partnership with The Hong Kong Government.
- Working closely with other medical organisations in Hong Kong. Nominate members to serve various medical and related institutions including the Medical Council of Hong Kong (MCHK). In addition, the Association of Licentiates of Medical Council of Hong Kong and the Chinese Medical Association in mainland China maintained a good relationship, to promote friendship and understanding of medical development in the two places.

== Membership ==
Members of the Association may be of any nationality and shall be of the following kinds:

- Life Members
- Regular Members
- Associate Members
- Fraternity Members
- Honorary Members
