= University of Hong Kong Faculty of Dentistry =

Dental school of the University of Hong Kong

Faculty of Dentistry, The University of Hong Kong
- 香港大學牙醫學院
- Type: Faculty
- Established: 1 July 1982; 44 years ago
- Parent institution: University of Hong Kong
- Dean: Lijian Jin
- Students: 827 (2026)
- Undergraduates: 516 (2026)
- Postgraduates: 311 (2026)
- Location: Prince Philip Dental Hospital, 34 Hospital Road, Sai Ying Pun, Hong Kong; 22.2864901°N 114.1442525°E
- Website: facdent.hku.hk

The Faculty of Dentistry of the University of Hong Kong (Chinese: 香港大學牙醫學院) is the dental school of the University of Hong Kong (HKU). Established in 1982, it is based at the Prince Philip Dental Hospital in Sai Ying Pun and is the only institution in Hong Kong that provides both undergraduate and postgraduate dental degrees.

The faculty is headed by Dean Lijian Jin. As of May 2026, it had 827 students, comprising 516 undergraduate, 89 taught postgraduate and 222 research postgraduate students. HKU was ranked second in the world for dentistry in the 2026 QS World University Rankings by Subject, behind the Karolinska Institute.

== History ==
In 1978, then HKU vice-chancellor Rayson Huang announced plans for the university to establish a Bachelor of Dental Surgery (BDS) programme. The first intake of dental students entered HKU in 1980 and initially received teaching through the university's Faculty of Medicine.

The Faculty of Dentistry was formally established at the Prince Philip Dental Hospital on 1 July 1982. The BDS programme was subsequently extended to five years in 1990. In 2012, it became a six-year programme following the introduction of Hong Kong's New Senior Secondary academic structure.

== Undergraduate education ==
The faculty offers a six-year Bachelor of Dental Surgery programme, the only undergraduate dental degree programme offered in Hong Kong.

Students receive clinical training primarily at the Prince Philip Dental Hospital. Other clinical learning takes place at facilities including the Li Ka Shing Faculty of Medicine, Queen Mary Hospital, government clinics, hospitals and private dental practices. The clinical phase of the BDS programme begins in the third year, when students begin treating patients under the supervision of clinical practitioners.

=== Professional registration ===
The BDS degree is recognised as a registrable primary qualification by the Dental Council of Hong Kong.

For the purposes of the Dentists Registration Ordinance (Cap. 156), a bachelor's degree in dentistry awarded by a university in Hong Kong specified in Schedule 1 to the Ordinance is a "qualifying degree in dentistry". The University of Hong Kong is the only university specified in Schedule 1.

Graduates holding a qualifying degree in dentistry may apply for provisional registration when engaged to undertake the statutory dental internship. The internship normally lasts 12 months and must be satisfactorily completed before a graduate may obtain the certificate of experience required to apply for full registration.

This differs from the pathway for non-locally trained dentists who qualify through the Dental Council's licensing examination, who are required to undertake a period of assessment under the provisional registration mechanism before applying for full registration.

== Postgraduate education ==
The faculty offers taught postgraduate programmes in ten subject areas, leading to Master of Dental Surgery (MDS) and Master of Science (MSc) degrees. It also offers an Advanced Diploma in Orthodontics.

Many of the taught postgraduate programmes fulfil training requirements for dental specialties recognised by the College of Dental Surgeons of Hong Kong.

=== Master of Dental Surgery ===
The faculty offers MDS programmes in:

- Endodontics
- Oral and maxillofacial surgery
- Orthodontics and Dentofacial Orthopaedics
- Paediatric Dentistry
- Periodontology
- Prosthodontics

=== Master of Science ===
The faculty offers MSc programmes in:

- Community Dentistry
- Dental Materials Science
- Implant Dentistry
- Oral and Maxillofacial Radiology and Diagnostic Imaging

The faculty also offers an Advanced Diploma in Orthodontics.

=== Research degrees ===
Research postgraduate programmes offered by the faculty lead to the degrees of Master of Philosophy (MPhil) and Doctor of Philosophy (PhD). Applicants to the research programmes may come from disciplines other than dentistry.

== Institute for Advanced Dentistry ==
The Institute for Advanced Dentistry – Multi-Specialty Clinic (IAD-MSC) is a postgraduate training centre and multi-specialty dental clinic operated by the faculty. It opened in 2020 and is located at Novum West, 460 Queen's Road West, Sai Wan.

The institute provides postgraduate clinical training for resident dentists under the supervision of faculty staff and provides dental services to patients with complex or severe oral conditions. Its facilities include 45 dental chairs, six day-surgery rooms, monitored anaesthesia care facilities and a dental technology laboratory.

== Notable alumni ==
- Alfred Hui – Hong Kong singer and dentist; graduated with a BDS in 2012.

== See also ==
- Prince Philip Dental Hospital
- University of Hong Kong
- Medical education in Hong Kong
