= Hong Kong Baptist University School of Chinese Medicine =

Coordinates: 22.3357°N 114.1826°E

School of Chinese medicine at HKBU

The School of Chinese Medicine at Hong Kong Baptist University is a school in Hong Kong that offers full-time degree programmes in Chinese medicine, Biomedical science, and pharmacy in Chinese medicine, also offers part-time programmes in Chinese medicine, pharmacy in Chinese medicine, acupuncture, tui na, orthopaedics and beauty care.

It currently manages The Chinese Medicine Hospital of Hong Kong.

== Databases produced by HKBU SCM ==
- Chinese Medicine Formulae Images Database School of Chinese Medicine, Hong Kong Baptist University. (in English and Chinese)
- Chinese Medicinal Material Images Database School of Chinese Medicine, Hong Kong Baptist University. (in English and Chinese)
- Medicinal Plant Images Database School of Chinese Medicine, Hong Kong Baptist University. (in English and Chinese)
- Phytochemical Images Database School of Chinese Medicine, Hong Kong Baptist University. (in English and Chinese)
- Chinese Medicine Specimen Database School of Chinese Medicine, Hong Kong Baptist University. (in English and Chinese)
- Chinese Medicine Game-based Exercise School of Chinese Medicine, Hong Kong Baptist University. (in English and Chinese)

== See also ==
- Faculties of Medicine in Hong Kong
