= Prince Philip Dental Hospital =

Prince Philip Dental Hospital 菲臘牙科醫院
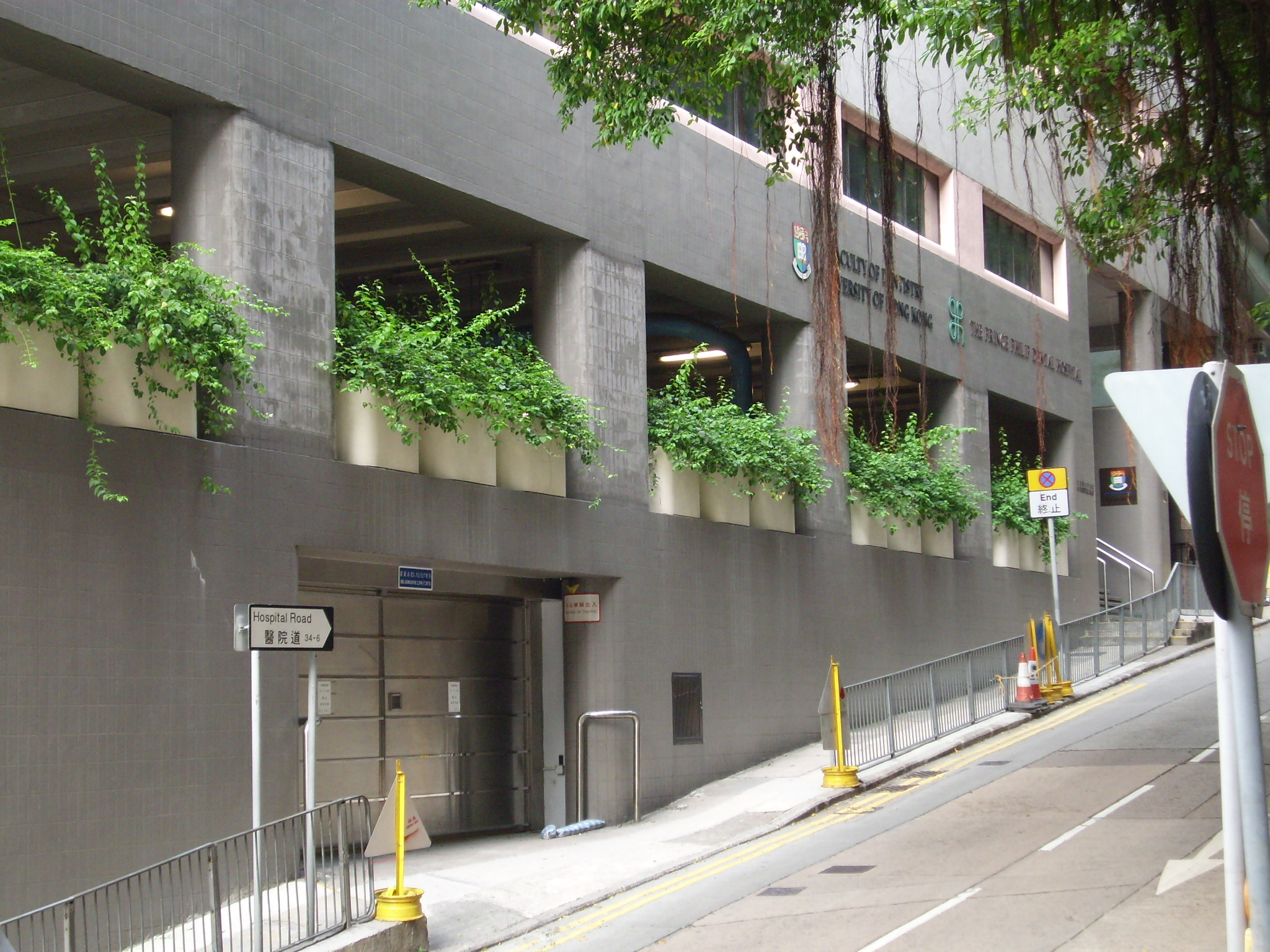
- Hospital Road entrance

- Location within Hong Kong

Geography
- Location: No. 34 Hospital Road, Sai Ying Pun, Hong Kong
- Coordinates: 22.286455°N 114.144274°E

Organisation
- Type: Teaching, Specialist
- Affiliated university: Faculty of Dentistry, University of Hong Kong

Services
- Emergency department: No

Helipads
- Helipad: No

History
- Founded: 24 March 1981; 45 years ago

Links
- Website: ppdh.org.hk/en

Prince Philip Dental Hospital
- Traditional Chinese: 菲臘牙科醫院
- Simplified Chinese: 菲腊牙科医院
- Literal meaning: Philip Dental Hospital
Transcriptions
Standard Mandarin
- Hanyu Pinyin: Fēilà Yákē Yīyuàn
Yue: Cantonese
- Yale Romanization: Fēi laahp ngàh fō yī yuhn
- Jyutping: Fei1 laap6 ngaa4 fo1 ji1 jyun6

The Prince Philip Dental Hospital (Chinese: 菲臘牙科醫院; PPDH) is a dental teaching hospital in Sai Ying Pun, Hong Kong. It houses the Faculty of Dentistry of the University of Hong Kong and is governed by the Prince Philip Dental Hospital Ordinance.

== History ==
=== Government Civil Hospital 1849–1937 ===
Government Civil Hospital was opened in 1849 on this site to provide Western medical care. The first hospital was destroyed by a typhoon in 1874 and relocated to new site at the former Hotel d'Europe and Central Police Barracks on Hollywood Road. The second site burned down in 1878. A third site was acquired in 1879 by relocating to the old Lock Hospital and remained there until it closed for good in 1937 after the opening of the Queen Mary Hospital.

=== Sai Ying Pun Hospital 1937–1978 ===
After 1937, the site was repurposed to handle infectious diseases as Sai Ying Pun Hospital and closed by 1978. This second hospital was demolished to make way for the current Dental Hospital.

=== Dental Hospital 1981–present ===
Construction on the $200 million hospital, designed by the Architectural Services Department, began in 1979. It was planned as a response to a shortage of dentists in the territory. It was opened on 24 March 1981 by Prince Philip, then-president of the British Dental Association.

Soon after the hospital opened, the Independent Commission Against Corruption carried out an extensive investigation into the provision of equipment at the new facility due to suspected commercial fraud. Much of the original equipment were suspected copies of reputable models and were not fully operable. Repairs and replacements had to be carried out on all dental chairs, stools, bunsen burners, dental drills, instrument modules, ultrasonic scalers, and operating lights. Investigators stated that there was no health threat to the public. In 1983 the hospital board chairman Lydia Dunn stated that the hospital was one of the foremost dental teaching hospitals in the world.

A 1984 report by the Audit Commission stated that 23% of the original equipment in the hospital was faulty, blaming the blunder on mismanagement and confused responsibility. Still, the hospital was considered world-class, and the first cohort of dental graduates eased the critical shortage of dentists in Hong Kong from 1985 onward.

As of 2016, two in three dentists in Hong Kong graduated from the University of Hong Kong (HKU). The HKU School of Dentistry was ranked #1 in the world in the 2016 QS World University Rankings.
