= Chinese Medicine Hospital of Hong Kong =

Hospital in New Territories, Hong Kong

The Chinese Medicine Hospital of Hong Kong 香港中醫醫院
- Hong Kong Baptist University
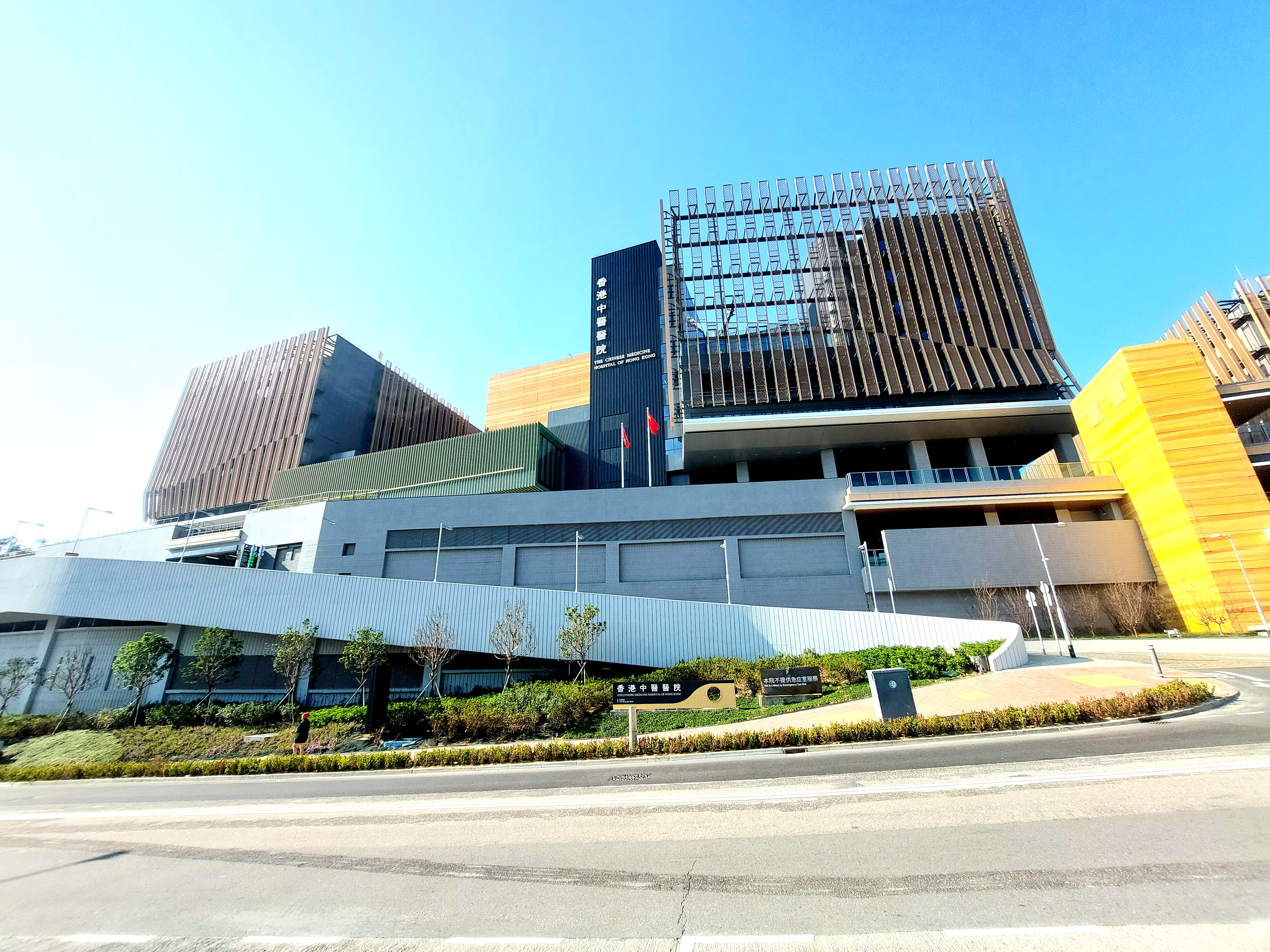
- Exterior view of hospital

- Location in Hong Kong

Geography
- Location: 1 Pak Shing Kok Road, Tseung Kwan O, New Territories, Hong Kong
- Coordinates: 22°18′15″N 114°16′22″E

Organisation
- Care system: Public
- Type: General, Teaching
- Affiliated university: Hong Kong Baptist University School of Chinese Medicine

Services
- Beds: 400

History
- Founded: 12 May 2021; 5 years ago
- Opened: 11 December 2025; 8 months ago

Links
- Website: cmhhk.org.hk
- Lists: Hospitals in Hong Kong

Chinese Medicine Hospital of Hong Kong
- Traditional Chinese: 香港中醫醫院
Transcriptions
Yue: Cantonese
- Yale Romanization: Hēung Góng Jūng Yī Yī Yún
- Jyutping: Hoeng1 Gong2 Zung1 Ji1 Ji1 Jyun2

The Chinese Medicine Hospital of Hong Kong (Chinese: 香港中醫醫院) is a public traditional Chinese medicine hospital located in Tseung Kwan O, Hong Kong. It is managed by Hong Kong Baptist University.

The hospital uses a model that integrates both traditional Chinese medicine and Western practices.

== History ==
On 12 May 2021, the Government of Hong Kong submitted documents to the Legislative Council of Hong Kong applying for a grant of HK$8.62 billion to build a Chinese Medicine Hospital and HK$2.05 billion to build a Government Chinese Medicines Testing Institute. On 20 May 2021, the application was approved.

In June 2021, Hong Kong Baptist University won the tender to operate the hospital. Construction of the hospital commenced in the same year.

On 11 December 2025, the hospital commenced operations.

== Gallery ==
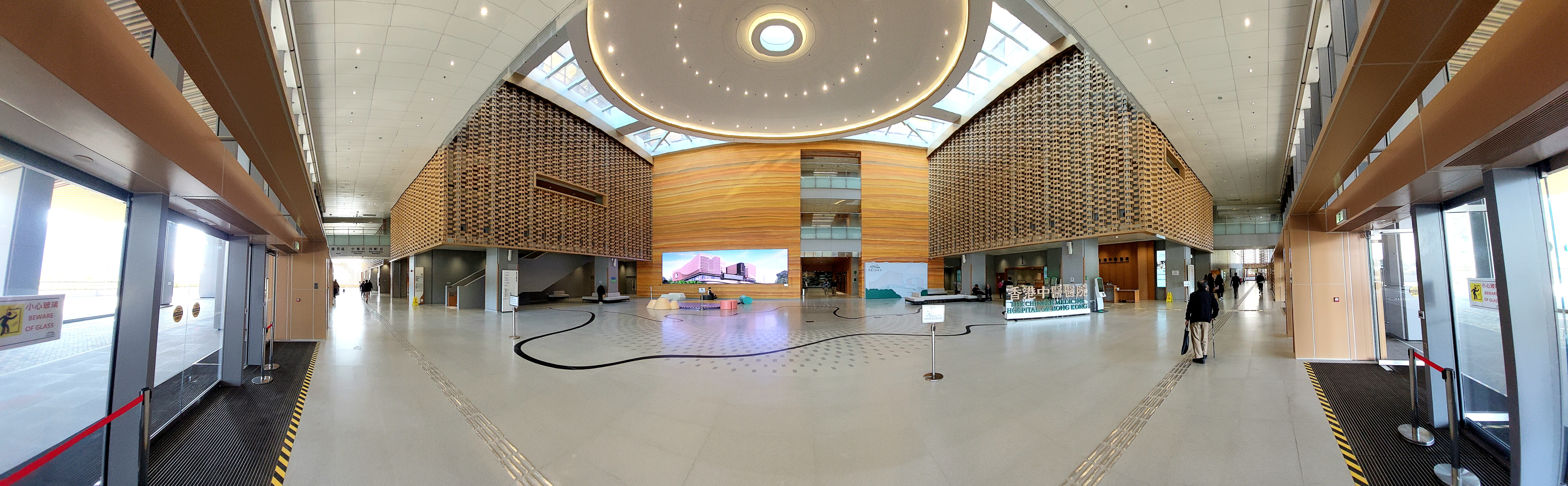
Lobby

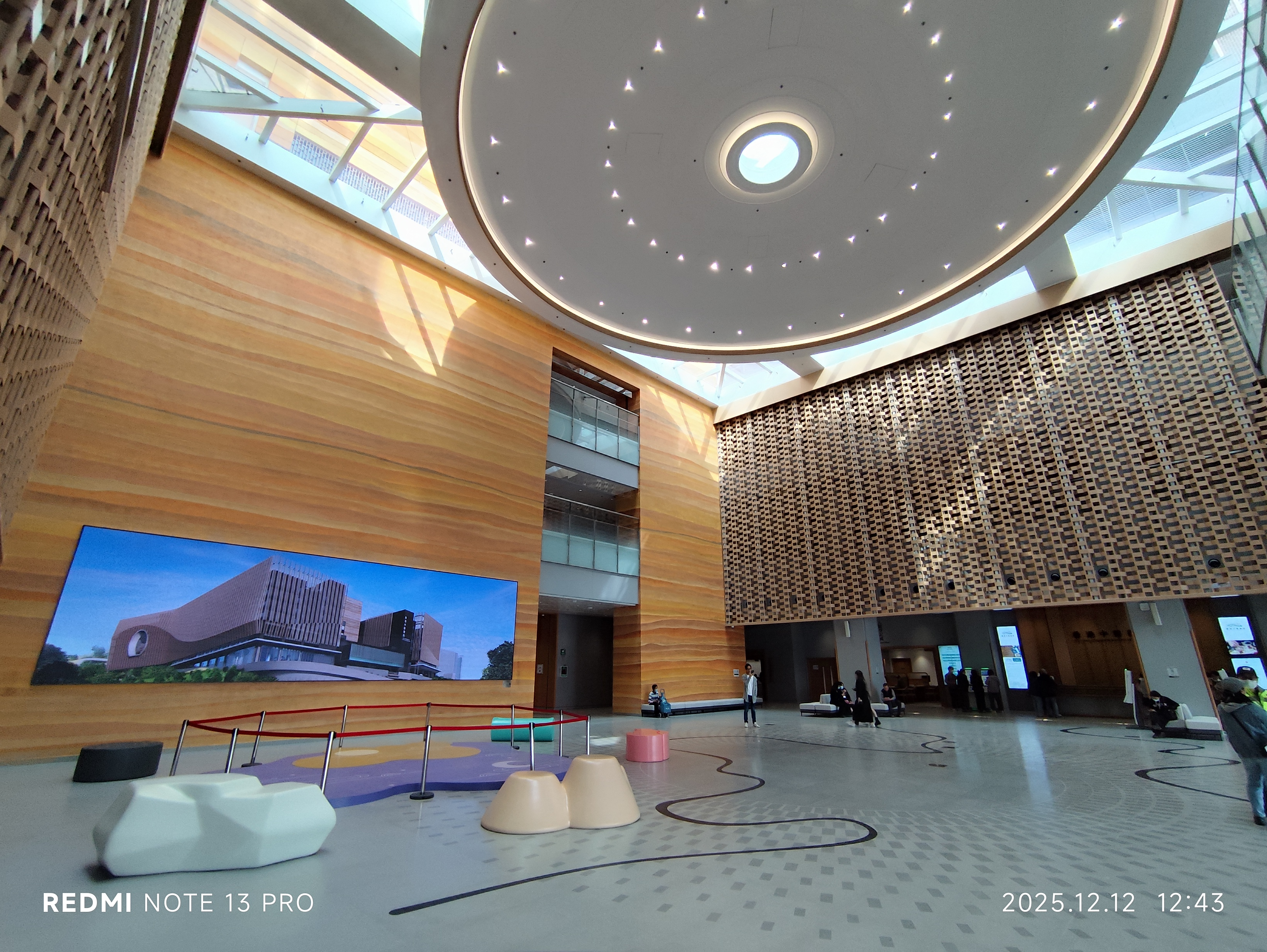
Atrium

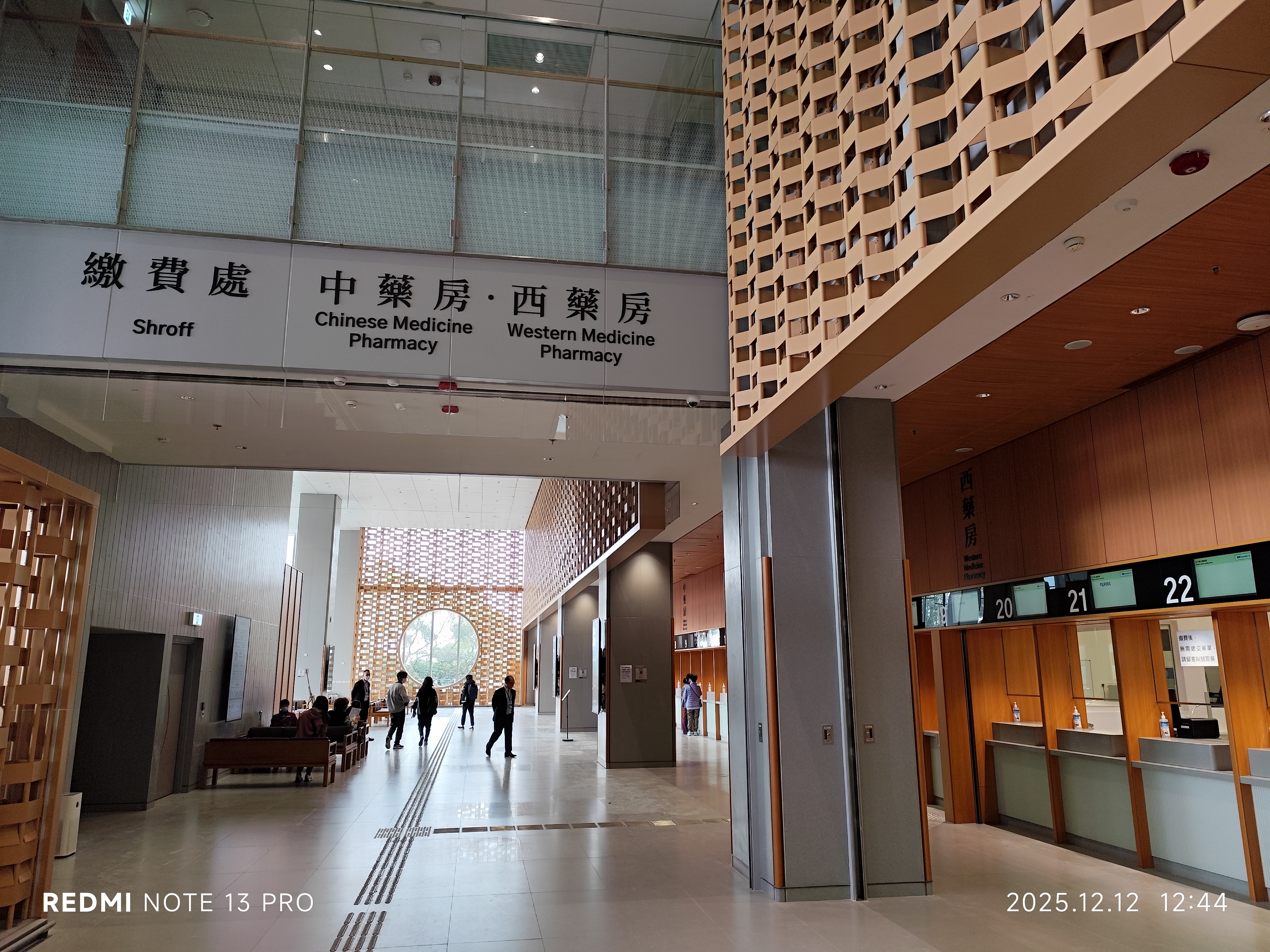
Interior

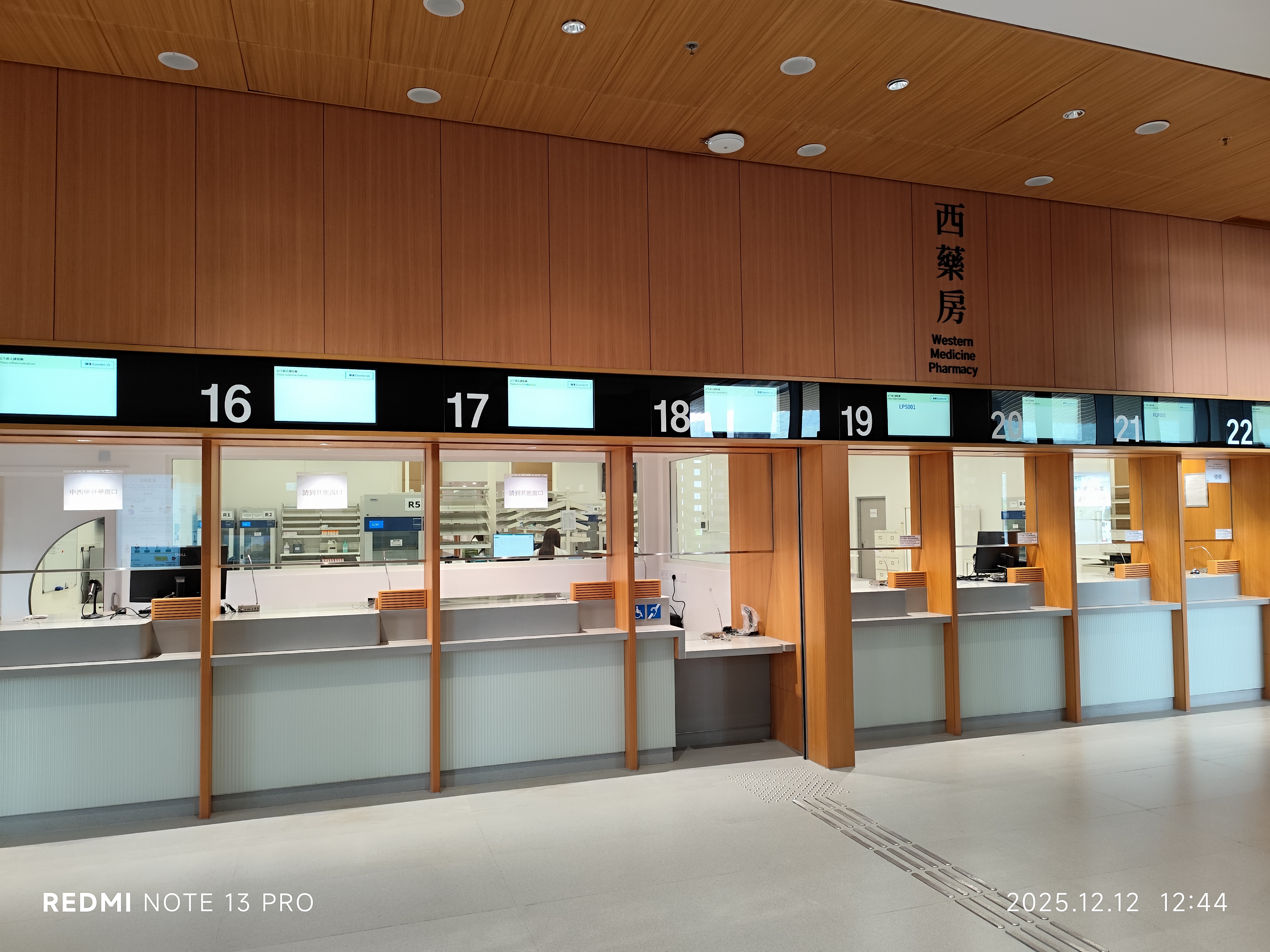
Western medicine pharmacy

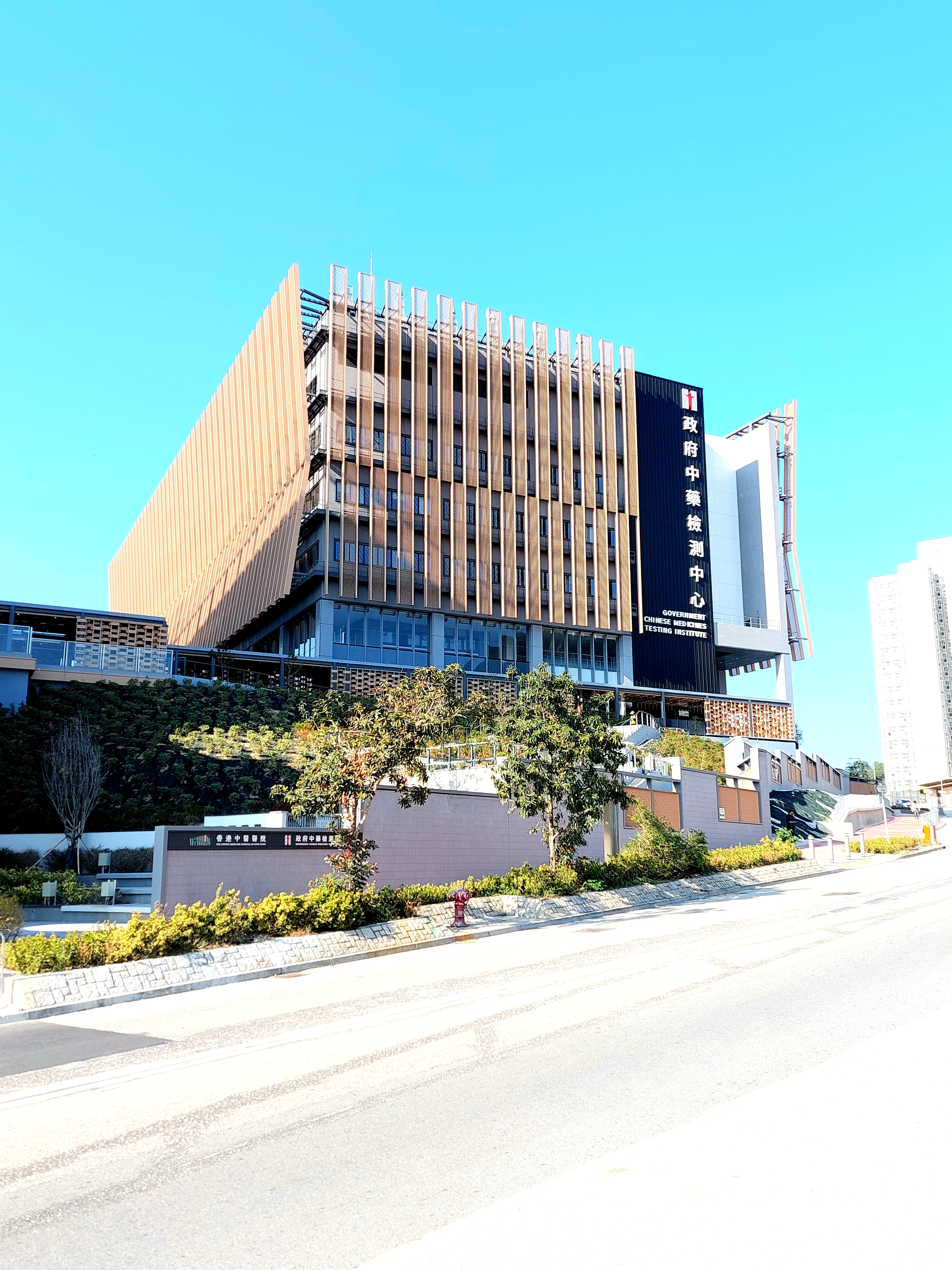
Testing Institute
