= Faculties of Medicines in Hong Kong =

Before the handover of Hong Kong to the People's Republic of China in 1997, medical education in this former British colony traditionally and exclusively followed the path of western medicine. Faculties of Medicine were modelled after those in the United Kingdom and the Commonwealth, and only doctors trained in western medicine were considered "formal" and "reliable". Chinese medicine practitioners had no formal status at that time. However, after the return of the territory to China, the practice of traditional Chinese medicine was further regulated and schools of Chinese Medicine were set up within some of the government-funded tertiary institutions in Hong Kong. The first school of its kind, the School of Chinese Medicine at Hong Kong Baptist University, was established in 1998. Currently, there are two faculties with academic programmes in western medicine and three schools of Chinese Medicine in the territory.

== Western Medicine ==
There are two schools that teach Western Medicine in Hong Kong, namely, the Li Ka Shing Faculty of Medicine at the University of Hong Kong (HKU Med) and the Faculty of Medicine at the Chinese University of Hong Kong. The medium of instruction is English.

== Traditional Chinese Medicine ==
There are three public, government-funded schools of Traditional Chinese Medicine / Pharmacy in Hong Kong, including the School of Chinese Medicine of Hong Kong Baptist University, the School of Chinese Medicine at the University of Hong Kong, and the School of Chinese Medicine at the Chinese University of Hong Kong.

== See also ==
- Higher education in Hong Kong
- Medical education in Hong Kong
- Medical education
- Medical school
