= University of Hong Kong Faculty of Education =

Faculty of the University of Hong Kong

Faculty of Education, The University of Hong Kong
- 香港大學教育學院
- Type: Faculty
- Established: July 1, 1984; 42 years ago
- Parent institution: University of Hong Kong
- Dean: Yang Rui
- Location: Meng Wah Complex, The University of Hong Kong, Pok Fu Lam, Hong Kong
- Website: web.edu.hku.hk

The Faculty of Education of the University of Hong Kong (Chinese: 香港大學教育學院) is the education faculty of the University of Hong Kong (HKU). Its origins date to 1917, when the Department for the Training of Teachers was established within the university's Faculty of Arts. The department became an autonomous School of Education in 1976 and was elevated to faculty status in 1984.

The faculty is headed by Dean Yang Rui. It offers undergraduate and postgraduate programmes in education and related fields, as well as programmes in speech-language pathology, information management and social data science.

HKU's education subject was ranked first globally for Education and Educational Research in the 2025–2026 U.S. News & World Report Best Global Universities Subject Rankings, fifth in Education and Training in the 2026 QS World University Rankings by Subject, and seventh in Education Studies in the 2026 Times Higher Education World University Rankings by subject.

== History ==
The Department for the Training of Teachers was established within HKU's Faculty of Arts on 15 September 1917. It provided courses for undergraduates intending to become school teachers.

Teacher education at the university was interrupted during the Japanese occupation of Hong Kong. A Department of Education was re-established within the Faculty of Arts in 1951.

In 1976, the Department of Education became an autonomous School of Education. On 1 July 1984, the school was elevated to become the Faculty of Education, initially comprising the Department of Education and the Department of Professional Studies.

The faculty became a unitary faculty on 1 September 2002.

== Academic organisation ==
The faculty comprises four academic units:

- Academic Unit of Language and Literacy Education
- Academic Unit of Human Communication, Learning, and Development
- Academic Unit of Mathematics, Science, and Technology
- Academic Unit of Social Contexts and Policies of Education

== Undergraduate programmes ==
The faculty offers the following undergraduate programmes:

- Bachelor of Arts and Bachelor of Education in Language Education — English
- Bachelor of Arts and Bachelor of Education in Language Education — Chinese
- Bachelor of Education and Bachelor of Science
- Bachelor of Education in Early Childhood Education and Special Education
- Bachelor of Science in Speech-Language Pathology

The Bachelor of Education and Bachelor of Social Sciences programme has been suspended for admission since the 2022–23 academic year.

The faculty also offers the following undergraduate top-up degree programmes for sub-degree holders:

- Bachelor of Science in Information Management
- Bachelor of Science in Applied Child Development
- Bachelor of Arts and Sciences in Social Data Science

== Professional recognition ==
Graduates who hold a recognised teacher-training qualification, including a Bachelor of Education, may apply to the Education Bureau for registration as a registered teacher in Hong Kong.

The Bachelor of Science in Speech-Language Pathology programme has been fully accredited by the Hong Kong Institute of Speech Therapists since June 2024. The institute is an accredited professional body for speech therapists under the Department of Health's Accredited Registers Scheme for Healthcare Professions.

== See also ==
- Education in Hong Kong
- University of Hong Kong
