= Hong Kong Medical Licensing Examination =

The Hong Kong Medical Licensing Examination (HKMLE) is a required assessment for doctors that graduated from medical schools outside of Hong Kong and forms part of the pathway to medical licensure in Hong Kong. The HKMLE is stipulated by the Medical Registration Ordinance. The HKMLE is held twice per year. The HKMLE is occasionally referred to by its official name the Licensing Examination of the Medical Council of Hong Kong. Candidates for the HKMLE are supported by an independent, non-profit professional body, known as the Licentiate Society. Graduates of local medical schools in Hong Kong, i.e., HKU and CUHK, are currently exempt from the HKMLE.

== Purpose ==
According to the Medical Registration Ordinance, the purpose of passing the HKMLE shows the achievement of a standard acceptable for registration as a medical practitioner in Hong Kong. In order to qualify to take the HKMLE, non-local medical graduates must first apply and undergo vetting of their medical education and training by the Medical Council of Hong Kong. Apart from passing the HKMLE, such doctors must also undergo a period of assessment in Hong Kong. Satisfactorily completing the process results in being awarded the LMCHK qualification.

== Parts ==
The exam consists of three parts: Part I) Examination in Professional Knowledge, Part II) Proficiency Test in Medical English, and Part III) Clinical Examination. From 2009-2019, the average percentage of test takers with a passing result was 24%, 85%, 37%, for Parts I-III respectively.

== Preparation ==
Candidates for the HKMLE typically spend several months preparing for each of Parts I and III of the exam. Some have criticized the exam to be excessively difficult. The Medical Council has responded that the examination is set at the same level as the final MB examination of the HKU MBBS/ CUHK MBChB, with questions taken from the same question bank. In order to facilitate preparation for the exam, the Medical Council launched an exam portal on 11 October 2018 with suggested readings and topics, instructive videos, and other information about the exam. In 2019, an independent, non-profit medical association known as the Medical Licentiate Society of Hong Kong (Licentiate Society) was founded. An important part of the Society's mission is to support candidates in their efforts in sitting the HKMLE.

== See also ==
- Australian Medical Council
- Medical Council of Canada Qualifying Examination
- Professional and Linguistic Assessments Board
- United States Medical Licensing Examination
