= Medical Licentiate Society of Hong Kong =

- Licentiate Society logo
- Abbreviation: Licentiate Society; LMCHK Soc
- Formation: June 15, 2017; 8 years ago
- Type: Nonprofit organization
- Legal status: Company limited by guarantee
- Headquarters: Hong Kong
- Region served: Worldwide
- Website: https://lmchk.org

Medical Licentiate Society of Hong Kong
- Traditional Chinese: 香港執照醫生醫學會
Transcriptions

The Medical Licentiate Society of Hong Kong (Licentiate Society, Chinese: 香港執照醫生醫學會, and branded also as LMCHK SOC) is an independent, non-profit, recognized professional body representing doctors that have graduated from medical schools outside of Hong Kong and that have attained (or are in the process of attaining) medical licensure in Hong Kong. The group was founded in 2017 and incorporated in 2019. It has offices in Wan Chai, Hong Kong. It is the only incorporated organization dedicated to such doctors.

== Background ==
The member doctors graduated from medical schools outside of Hong Kong, attained medical licensure in their original jurisdiction, and then successfully cleared the qualification requirements for registering as a medical practitioner in Hong Kong.

Before non-local medical graduates can become registered medical practitioners in Hong Kong, they are required to attain a license from the Medical Council of Hong Kong (i.e., the Licentiate of the Medical Council of Hong Kong or LMCHK qualification). The pathway to earn the qualification requires passing a rigorous Hong Kong Medical Licensing Examination (HKMLE) and undergoing a period of training or local work experience. LMCHK doctors are thus both licensed and registered in Hong Kong.

Prior to 1997, the LMCHK doctors consisted overwhelmingly of graduates from Mainland China. The pre-1997 colonial government exempted graduates of commonwealth countries from having to sit for a licensing exam or having to serve additional training. After 1997, all non-local graduates were required to earn the LMCHK licensure in order to register to practice in Hong Kong. Consequently, the geographic and ethnic diversity of LMCHK doctors has increased particularly in the last several years.

== History ==
The rigorous requirements to become an LMCHK doctor has given the group a common bond. With the growing size and diversity of LMCHK doctors post-1997, interest grew within the LMCHK community to meet up. To this end, there were periodic social events throughout the years from 1997 to 2016. The Licentiate Society traces its formation to 15 June 2017, when the doctors started a popular WhatsApp group and began meeting regularly.

On this same day, 11 members of the LMCHK community held a happy hour social. The group continued to grow and hold regular meet-ups, dinners, and other events. In August 2019, the members outnumbered the WhatsApp limit of 256 people. To address the overflow, they formed additional groups.

The quarterly events (and more) have been held continuously since June 2017. On 26 November 2019, the group incorporated as a nonprofit company limited by guarantee with the name Medical Licentiate Society of Hong Kong. On 9 June 2022, the organization moved to a new office location in Wan Chai in order to expand its administrative support.

The Licentiate Society has LMCHK doctors from over 20 different licensing jurisdictions including (in order by relative numbers of doctors): UK, Mainland China, Australia, Ireland, USA, Canada, South Africa, Chinese Taipei, Singapore, Belgium, India, Korea, Nepal, Netherlands Antilles, New Zealand, Poland, Portugal, Russia, United Arab Emirates, and Venezuela.

== Purpose ==
The Licentiate Society's aims include:

- Nurtures the needs of the LMCHK community through social events and medical education.
- Represents LMCHK community's interests in and outside of Hong Kong
- Supports the efforts of candidates sitting for the HKMLE, including holding exam review sessions
- Endorses public education and engagement
- Promotes the highest standards of healthcare, professionalism, safety, and education
- Encourages working with other medical practitioners and doctors and community organizations in realizing it objectives

== Governance ==
The Licentiate Society's governing body is the Council and consists of 9 Council Members, who serve as its board of directors. Three Council Members hold officer positions as follows: President, Honorary Secretary, and Honorary Treasurer.

== Membership ==
There are 4 classes of members: Full, Associate, Honorary, and Corporate. Only Full Members may vote and hold office.

== Committees ==
The Licentiate Society has 3 approved committees, which consist of the following: Member Services, Medical Education, and Industry Relations.
