= Licentiate of the Medical Council of Hong Kong =

Licentiate of the Medical Council of Hong Kong (LMCHK) is a medical license issued by the Medical Council of Hong Kong to doctors that have graduated from medical schools outside of Hong Kong and have met the requirements for such licensure in Hong Kong. The Medical Council of Hong Kong requires that these non-locally graduated doctors display the LMCHK qualification as a post-nominal title first, before listing any other quotable qualifications, such as MD or MBBS. The LMCHK are represented by the Licentiate Society, an independent, non-profit organization.

== History ==
Prior to the 1997 handover, graduates of non-Commonwealth jurisdictions had to obtain the LMCHK medical license before being eligible to practice medicine in Hong Kong. During this Colonial era, doctors of Commonwealth countries were automatically granted registration by the MCHK without taking an examination or undergoing an internship or other period of assessment. A few hundred of the Colonial doctors remain in practice in Hong Kong today. Since 1997, all non-locally trained doctors have to obtain the LMCHK medical license from the MCHK. Consequently, the countries of origin of the LMCHK doctors have changed dramatically in the last 20 years; the group is now much more diverse.

== Aims ==
A key facet of the attaining the LMCHK is passing the Hong Kong Medical Licensing Examination (HKMLE). According to the Medical Registration Ordinance, the purpose of passing the HKMLE shows the achievement of a standard acceptable for registration as a medical practitioner in Hong Kong.

== Process ==
The process involves assessment of the doctors’ medical education and professional knowledge, and have been found to be consistent with the high standards established and demanded by the Medical Council of Hong Kong. To be awarded the LMCHK designation, the doctors must pass the rigorous HKMLE and undergo a period of assessment.

To start the process of attaining LMCHK from the Medical Council of Hong Kong, doctors must apply after having fulfilled at least 5 years of non-local medical training, including having graduated from an accredited medical school outside of Hong Kong and completed an internship in a hospital.

Once attained, the LMCHK designation allows holders of the qualification to register as medical practitioners in Hong Kong. LMCHK doctors must thus be both licensed and registered to practice medicine in Hong Kong. In contrast, graduates of HKU and CUHK are eligible to directly register as medical practitioners in Hong Kong after internship by virtue of their local medical school degree without having to first seek a medical license.

== Society ==
The rigorous requirements for LMCHK doctors and their increasing numbers has fostered a camaraderie among them. In 2017, the LMCHK doctors founded a non-profit, professional association called The Medical Licentiate Society of Hong Kong (Licentiate Society) to represent them and to meet their group's professional needs.
