= John Lee Ka-chiu government =

Administration of Hong Kong since 2022

John Lee Ka-chiu Government
- 6th Government of the Hong Kong; Special Administrative Region

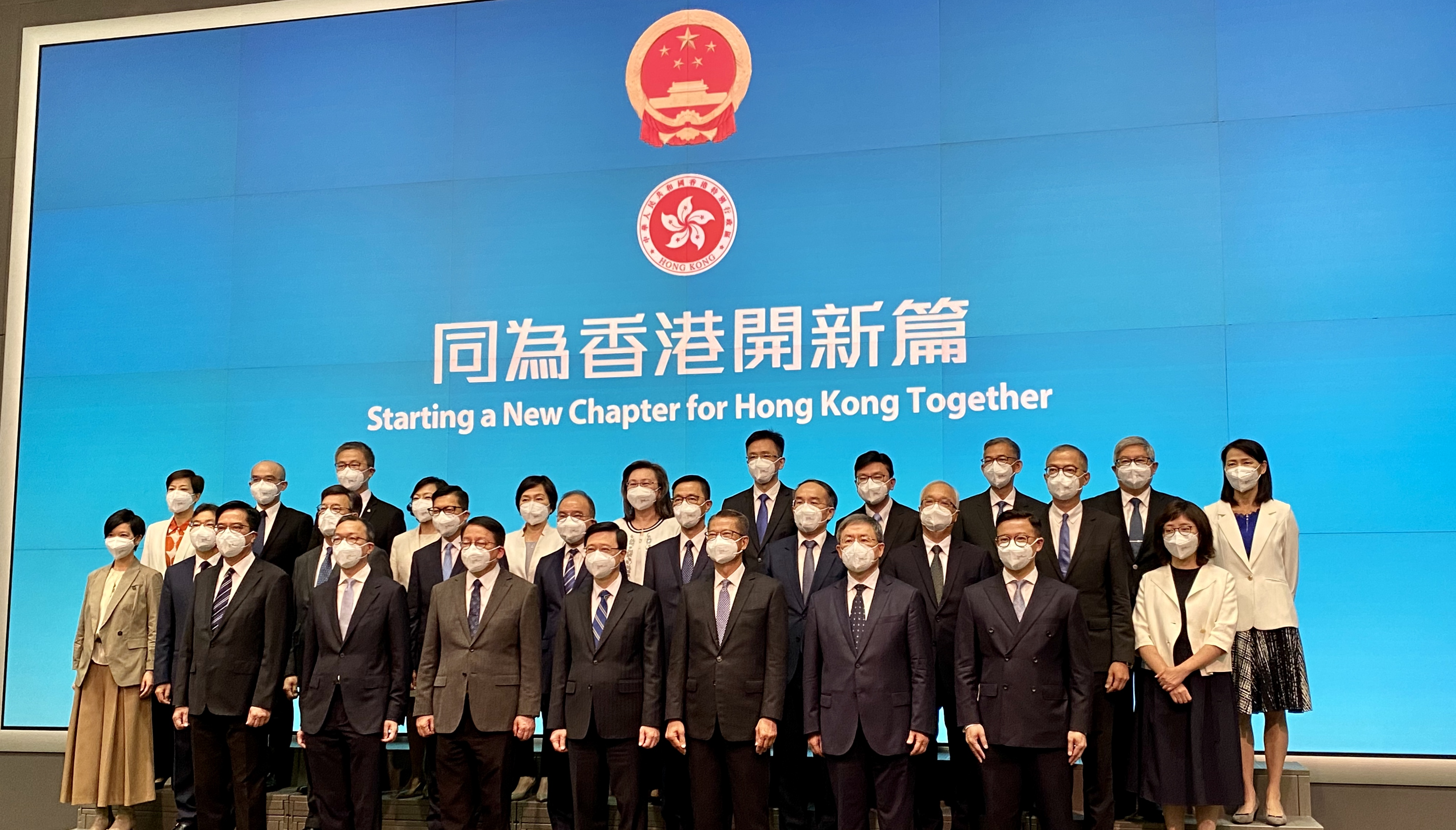
- Lee with his cabinet on 19 June 2022
- Date formed: 1 July 2022; 4 years ago

People and organisations
- CCP General Secretary (Note: The top position held by Xi Jinping is General Secretary of the Chinese Communist Party, thus the officeholder holds ultimate power and authority over party and state.): Xi Jinping
- Head of government: John Lee Ka-chiu
- Premier of China: Li Keqiang; Li Qiang
- Member parties: DAB, FTU, BPA, NPP, LP
- Status in legislature: Pro-Beijing supermajority
- Opposition party: None

History
- Election: 2022 Chief Executive election
- Legislature term: 7th Legislative Council
- Predecessor: Lam government

The administration of John Lee Ka-chiu as Chief Executive of Hong Kong, officially referred to as "The 6th term Chief Executive of Hong Kong", relates to the period of governance of Hong Kong headed by Chief Executive John Lee Ka-chiu, starting from 1 July 2022.

== Background and election ==
With the legislating of the National Security Law constraining the pro-democracy movement and the opposition camp, there was virtually no opposition in Hong Kong. Legislation were passed in the legislature without obstacle, especially after 2021 election which saw electoral changes being implemented afterwards, affecting the composition of the Legislative Council.

In the 2022 Chief Executive election, John Lee, promoted from Secretary for Security to Chief Secretary for Administration a year ago, received the approval of the Candidate Eligibility Review Committee to stand in the election and was the sole candidate of the leadership race, backed by the pro-Beijing camp. Receiving 99% of votes in the 1,461-member Election Committee, Lee was chosen as the Chief Executive of Hong Kong.

Lee received the appointment from Chinese Premier Li Keqiang on 30 May 2022.

== Cabinet ==
It was reported on 16 June 2022 that John Lee had decided on the members of his Executive Council. The official list was announced on 19 June after the State Council approved the nominations by Lee. Four of the senior officials were under the United States sanctions after the imposition of the National Security Law in Hong Kong, including Chief Secretary nominee Eric Chan, former Directior of Immigration. One-third of the cabinet ministers are from the civil service, although the two highest-ranking positions were occupied by former officers from Disciplined Services. Some believed the government will continue its focus on public and national security.

The Legislative Council passed a government restructuring package on 15 June, adding new deputies to the Chief Secretary, Financial Secretary and Secretary for Justice, as proposed by incoming Chief Executive John Lee. Two new bureaux were created, with some existing revamped to transfer responsibilities to the new departments.

=== Ministry ===
Portfolio	Minister	Took office	Left office	Party
Chief Executive	John Lee	1 July 2022	Incumbent	Nonpartisan
Chief Secretary for Administration	Eric Chan	1 July 2022	Incumbent	Nonpartisan
Financial Secretary	Paul Chan	16 January 2017	Incumbent	Nonpartisan
Secretary for Justice	Paul Lam	1 July 2022	Incumbent	Nonpartisan
Deputy Chief Secretary for Administration	Warner Cheuk	1 July 2022	Incumbent	Nonpartisan
Deputy Financial Secretary	Michael Wong	1 July 2022	Incumbent	Nonpartisan
Deputy Secretary for Justice	Horace Cheung	1 July 2022	Incumbent	Nonpartisan
Secretary for Culture, Sports and Tourism	Kevin Yeung	1 July 2022	5 December 2024	Nonpartisan
Secretary for Culture, Sports and Tourism	Rosanna Law	5 December 2024	Incumbent	Nonpartisan
Secretary for Constitutional and Mainland Affairs	Erick Tsang	22 April 2020	27 January 2026	Nonpartisan
Secretary for Constitutional and Mainland Affairs	Janice Tse	30 March 2026	Incumbent	Nonpartisan
Secretary for Financial Services and the Treasury	Christopher Hui	22 April 2020	Incumbent	DAB
Secretary for Security	Chris Tang	25 June 2021	Incumbent	Nonpartisan
Secretary for Environment and Ecology	Tse Chin-wan	1 July 2022	Incumbent	Nonpartisan
Secretary for Commerce and Economic Development	Algernon Yau	1 July 2022	Incumbent	Nonpartisan
Secretary for Health	Lo Chung-mau	1 July 2022	Incumbent	Nonpartisan
Secretary for Transport and Logistics	Lam Sai-hung	1 July 2022	5 December 2024	Nonpartisan
Secretary for Transport and Logistics	Mable Chan	5 December 2024	Incumbent	Nonpartisan
Secretary for Development	Bernadette Linn	1 July 2022	Incumbent	Nonpartisan
Secretary for Housing	Winnie Ho	1 July 2022	29 October 2026	Nonpartisan
Secretary for the Civil Service	Ingrid Yeung	1 July 2022	Incumbent	Nonpartisan
Secretary for Education	Christine Choi	1 July 2022	Incumbent	Nonpartisan
Secretary for Innovation, Technology and Industry	Dong Sun	1 July 2022	Incumbent	Nonpartisan
Secretary for Home and Youth Affairs	Alice Mak	1 July 2022	Incumbent	FTU
Secretary for Labour and Welfare	Chris Sun	1 July 2022	Incumbent	Nonpartisan

=== Other posts ===
- Commissioner of Police: Raymond Siu (until April 2025), Joe Chow (since April 2025)
- Commissioner of the Independent Commission Against Corruption: Woo Ying-ming
- Director of Audit: Nelson Lam
- Director of Immigration: Au Ka-wang (until 2023), Benson Kwok (since 2023)
- Commissioner of Customs and Excise: Louise Ho (until 2024), Chan Tsz-tat (since 2024)

=== Executive Council non-official members ===
The new members of the Executive Council were announced on 22 June 2022.

Members	Affiliation	Portfolio	Assumed office	Left office	Born in	Ref
Regina Ip	NPP	Non-official Convenor of the ExCo; Legislative Council Member & Chairlady of NPP	1 July 2017	Incumbent	1950	
Arthur Li	Nonpartisan	Member of the Committee for the Basic Law of the HKSAR of the NPCSC	1 July 2012	Incumbent	1945	
Jeffrey Lam	BPA	Legislative Council Member & Vice-Chairman of BPA	17 October 2012	Incumbent	1951	
Tommy Cheung	Liberal	Legislative Council Member, Chairman of Liberal Party	25 November 2016	Incumbent	1949	
Martin Liao	Nonpartisan	Legislative Council Member	25 November 2016	Incumbent	1957	
Joseph Yam	Nonpartisan	Executive Vice President of the China Society for Finance and Banking	1 July 2017	Incumbent	1948	
Ronny Tong	Path of Democracy	Senior Counsel & Convenor of Path of Democracy	1 July 2017	Incumbent	1950	
Lam Ching-choi	Nonpartisan	Chairman of the Elderly Commission	1 July 2017	Incumbent	1960	
Kenneth Lau	BPA	Legislative Council Member & Chairman of Heung Yee Kuk	1 July 2017	Incumbent	1966	
Moses Cheng	Nonpartisan	Practicing solicitor Chairman of the Council of HSUHK	1 July 2022	Incumbent	1950	
Margaret Leung	Nonpartisan	Treasurer of HKU; Former CEO of Hang Seng Bank Limited	1 July 2022	Incumbent	1952	
Chan Kin-por	Nonpartisan	Legislative Council Member	1 July 2022	Incumbent	1954	
Eliza Chan	Nonpartisan	Member of the National Committee of CPPCC	1 July 2022	Incumbent	1957	
Ko Wing-man	Nonpartisan	Former Secretary for Food and Health	1 July 2022	Incumbent	1957	
Ng Chau-pei	FTU	Legislative Council Member & President of FTU	1 July 2022	Incumbent	1970	
Gary Chan	DAB	Legislative Council Member & Vice-Chairman of DAB	1 July 2022	Incumbent	1976	

=== Reshuffles ===
==== December 2024 ====
Lee reshuffled his cabinet on 5 December 2024, beginning with the dismissals of the secretaries for the culture and transport bureaux. Director of Housing Rosanna Law succeeded Kevin Yeung as the new Secretary for Culture, Sports and Tourism, who was under fire in recent months over the push for "mega-event economy" and rebuilding Hong Kong’s post-pandemic tourism appeal, such as the Messi's Mess. Secretary for Transport and Logistics Lam Sai-hung was replaced by Mable Chan, the permanent secretary of the bureau. Lee evaded questions on the reasons behind the reshuffle, but mentioned his wishes for "a team and secretaries that will be able to deliver what I have in mind" and to "create the best result in the shortest period of Hong Kong" after time was lost because of COVID and the 2019 "riots". He also praised the two new secretaries for having "reform mindsets".

While Yeung was embattled for some months, the reshuffle still came as a surprise. Sources quoted by the media said the two ministers were only told of their dismissal a day before the announcement. It was later reported that Lee intended to fire the two ministers earlier that year for their "poor performance and inability to steer sectors seen as crucial to the city’s reputation and economic growth", and at once even considering sacking the environment minister Tse Chin-wan after the waste charging scheme failed. However, the leader held off the reshuffle to project a strong image of governance as the national security legislation was under way. During a media interview over half a year later, Lee said his new administration supports his ideal, hinting that the reshuffle could be related to the duo's self-centred ego.

Non-principal officials are italicised.

Colour key
- Promoted
- Left the government

Minister	Party	Before reshuffle	After reshuffle
Rosanna Law Shuk-pui JP	Nonpartisan	Director of Housing	Secretary for Culture, Sports and Tourism
Mable Chan JP	Nonpartisan	Permanent Secretary for Transport and Logistics	Secretary for Transport and Logistics
Kevin Yeung Yun-hung JP	Nonpartisan	Secretary for Culture, Sports and Tourism	Left the government
Lam Sai-hung GBS JP	Nonpartisan	Secretary for Transport and Logistics	Left the government

==== January 2026 ====
Ming Pao published a front page report on 22 January 2026 that housing minister Winnie Ho and constitutional minister Erick Tsang could be leaving their positions "shortly". Other local reports indicated that the reshuffle could involve Development Secretary Bernadette Linn, another minister, and a deputy secretary. The shakeup could happen around Lunar New Year and before Two Sessions in China. The removals are believed to be unrelated with the Wang Fuk Court fire as John Lee reportedly told his ministers at morning prayer session that actions against officials would be taken after the independent review committee conducted the probe.

State media announced on 27 January 2026 that Erick Tsang had been removed from the position of Secretary for Constitutional and Mainland Affairs. Tsang later confirmed that he had resigned earlier on health basis. Undersecretary Clement Woo was appointed as the acting minister following Tsang’s resignation until 30 March, where Janice Tse was appointed as new secretary. John Lee added that he has no further plans to replace other ministers, and that the rumours are not facts.

== Notes ==
Preceded by Carrie Lam	Government of Hong Kong; 2022–present	Succeeded by Incumbent
