= Principal officials of Hong Kong =

Position within the Hong Kong Government

Principal officials (Chinese: 主要官員), according to the Basic Law, are government officials who are nominated by the Chief Executive and appointed by the State Council of the People's Republic of China. They include departmental secretaries and secretaries of policy bureaux. Five other officials are also principal officials because of the importance of their positions (although three of them report to the secretaries and permanent secretaries of policy bureaux).

They are required to be citizens of the People's Republic of China who are permanent residents of Hong Kong with no right of abode in any foreign country who have ordinarily resided in Hong Kong for a continuous period of not less than 15 years.

When assuming office, they must, in accordance with law, swear to uphold the Basic Law and swear their allegiance to the Hong Kong Special Administrative Region of the People's Republic of China.

Since the introduction of the Principal Officials Accountability System on 1 July 2002 (and since 2008 Political Appointments System), secretaries of departments and secretaries of bureaux (but not the other five officials) are political appointees. Before that all of the principal officials were civil servants. The civil servants who held the positions of secretaries of bureaux have their titles changed to permanent secretaries, and are no longer principal officials.

== List ==
=== Secretaries of Departments ===
- Chief Secretary for Administration (Eric Chan)
- Financial Secretary (Paul Chan Mo-po)
- Secretary for Justice (Paul Lam)

=== Deputy Secretaries of Departments ===
- Deputy Chief Secretary for Administration (Warner Cheuk)
- Deputy Financial Secretary (Michael Wong Wai-lun)
- Deputy Secretary for Justice (Horace Cheung)

=== Directors of Bureaux ===
- Supervised by the Chief Secretary:
  - Secretary for the Civil Service (Ingrid Yeung Ho Poi-yan)
  - Secretary for Constitutional and Mainland Affairs (Erick Tsang)
  - Secretary for Education (Choi Yuk-lin)
  - Secretary for Environment and Ecology (Tse Chin-wan)
  - Secretary for Health (Lo Chung-mau)
  - Secretary for Home and Youth Affairs (Alice Mak)
  - Secretary for Labour and Welfare (Chris Sun)
  - Secretary for Security (Chris Tang)
  - Secretary for Culture, Sports and Tourism (Rosanna Law)
- Supervised by the Financial Secretary:
  - Secretary for Commerce and Economic Development (Algernon Yau)
  - Secretary for Development (Bernadette Linn)
  - Secretary for Financial Services and the Treasury (Christopher Hui)
  - Secretary for Innovation, Technology and Industry (Dong Sun)
  - Secretary for Housing (Winnie Ho)
  - Secretary for Transport and Logistics (Mable Chan)

=== Heads of Specified Independent Agencies or Disciplined Services ===
- Commissioner of Police (Joe Chow)
- Commissioner, Independent Commission Against Corruption (Woo Ying-ming)
- Director of Audit (Nelson Lam)
- Commissioner of Customs and Excise (Chan Tsz-tat)
- Director of Immigration (Benson Kwok)
