= Hong Kong Housing Authority =

Hong Kong government agency

- 香港房屋委員會

Agency overview
- Formed: April 1973; 53 years ago
- Headquarters: 33 Fat Kwong Street, Ho Man Tin
- Agency executive: Winnie Ho, Chairwoman
- Website: housingauthority.gov.hk

Hong Kong Housing Authority
- Traditional Chinese: 香港房屋委員會
- Simplified Chinese: 香港房屋委员会
Transcriptions
Standard Mandarin
- Hanyu Pinyin: Xiānggǎng Fángwū Wěiyuánhuì
- Wade–Giles: Hsiang^{1}-kang^{3} Fang^{2}-wu^{1} Wei^{3}yüan^{2}hui^{4}
- IPA: [ɕjáŋ.kàŋ fǎn.ú wěɪ.ɥɛ̌n.xwêɪ]
Yue: Cantonese
- Yale Romanization: Hēung góng fòhng ūk wái yùhn wúi
- Jyutping: Hoeng1 gong2 fong4 uk1 wai2 jyun4 wui2
- IPA: [hœŋ˥.kɔŋ˧˥.fɔŋ˩.ʊk̚˥.wɐj˧˥.jyn˩.wuj˧˥]

The Hong Kong Housing Authority (HA) is the main provider of public housing in Hong Kong. It was established in April 1973 under the Housing Ordinance and is an agency of the Government of Hong Kong. In the same year, the Resettlement Department and the Building Section of the Urban Services Department were merged to form the Housing Department, which acts as the Housing Authority's executive body.

== History ==
The modern Housing Authority was founded in 1973.

In 2005, most Housing Authority-owned shopping centres and car parks were controversially divested to Link REIT.

A citywide scandal erupted in 2015 after heavy metals were found in the water supply of some housing estates, schools, and private residential buildings. The contamination was first identified at Kai Ching Estate, opened in 2013. A task force found that the contamination was caused by solder joints with high lead content.

== Responsibilities ==
Outside of public housing provision, the authority is also responsible for the management of public rental housing estates, interim housing estates, transit centres, demolished factories and ancillary commercial and non-domestic facilities such as shopping centres, market stalls and car parks. It also acts as the agent for the government when it comes to clearing land, and according to its own policy "preventing squatting and implementing improvements in squatter areas."It also previously developed flatted factory estates, including Wang Cheong Factory Estate, to support small and medium-sized industrial activities.

Though most commercial assets of the Housing Authority were divested to the Link REIT in 2005, the Housing Authority still manages some shopping centres as well as 21 markets. There have been calls for the government to buy back the properties sold to the Link as rent increases have placed a financial burden on public housing residents.

== Composition ==
At the time of its creation, membership of the authority was made up as follows:

- Secretary of Housing (chairman)
- Eight Urban Councillors
- Five unofficial members
- Six official members

Currently, members are appointed by the Chief executive of Hong Kong. They are: the chairman, Vice-chairman, two official members and 26 non-official members.

== Roles ==
The Authority operates the Tenants Purchase Scheme, the Home Ownership Scheme and the Private Sector Participation Scheme. They were also formerly responsible for a loan scheme targeted at low-income home buyers, which provided interest-free loans of up to HK$530,000 or monthly mortgage subsidies of up to HK$3,800 to help low-income individuals or families buy their own flats.

More than 8,000 low-income families are subsidised, although the scheme was halted in 2003 pending a review. In June 2004, the definitive abolition of the scheme was announced.

In 2019, the 4,871 flats from six estates was largest number of subsidised homes put on the market since the Home Ownership Scheme was restarted in 2011; But only 54 of 80 randomly selected buyers turned up – a low turnout rate that would have been unheard of in the past.

== Key people ==
Since 1 July 2007, following a reorganisation of government agencies, the role of Chairman of the Housing Authority is held by the Secretary for Transport and Housing (a position created in 2007). This role was previously held by the Secretary for Housing, Planning and Lands. The Director of Housing is vice-chairman of the HA. Past and present Chairpersons of the Hong Kong Housing Authority have included:

- Winnie HO Wing-yin: 2022–present
- Frank Chan Fan: 2017–2022
- Anthony Cheung: 2012–2017
- Eva Cheng: 2007–2012
- Michael Suen: 2002–2007
- Dr. Cheng Hon-kwan: 2000–2002
- Dame Dr. Rosanna Wong Yick-ming: 1992–2000
- Sir David Akers-Jones: 1987–1992

== Location ==
The Hong Kong Housing Authority Headquarters are located at 33 Fat Kwong Street, Ho Man Tin, Kowloon. The Hong Kong Housing Authority Exhibition Centre is located nearby at 3/F, Homantin Plaza, 80 Fat Kwong Street.

== See also ==
- Public housing in Hong Kong
- Hong Kong Housing Society
- List of public housing estates in Hong Kong
- List of Home Ownership Scheme Courts in Hong Kong
- My Home Purchase Plan
- Public factory estates in Hong Kong
