= Transport and Logistics Bureau =

Policy bureau of Hong Kong

- 運輸及物流局

Agency overview
- Formed: 2022
- Jurisdiction: Government of Hong Kong
- Headquarters: 22/F, East Wing, Central Government Offices, 2 Tim Mei Avenue, Tamar, Hong Kong
- Agency executives: Mable Chan, Secretary; Liu Chun-san, Under Secretary; Vaccant, Permanent Secretary; Alfred Chan, Political Assistant
- Parent department: Financial Secretary
- Website: Official Website

Transport and Logistics Bureau (Chinese: 運輸及物流局) is a policy bureau for the Government of Hong Kong. It is responsible for the transport and logistics policy portfolios. The agency was established on 1 July 2022, when the housing portfolios of the former Transport and Housing Bureau was spun off to form the Housing Bureau. The current (since 1 July 2022) Secretary for Transport and Logistics is Lam Sai-hung.

This bureau was newly established under the reorganisation of policy bureaux proposed by Carrie Lam, the fifth Chief Executive of Hong Kong, and was adopted by John Lee, the succeeding Chief Executive after Carrie Lam. On 19 June 2022, the Central People's Government announced the appointment of Lam Sai-hung, former Permanent Secretary for Development (Works), as the first Secretary for Transport and Logistics.

== Subordinate departments ==
There are several departments under the bureau:

- Civil Aviation Department
- Highways Department
- Marine Department
- Transport Department
