= Lam government =

2017–2022 administration of Hong Kong

Carrie Lam Government
- 5th Government of the Hong Kong; Special Administrative Region

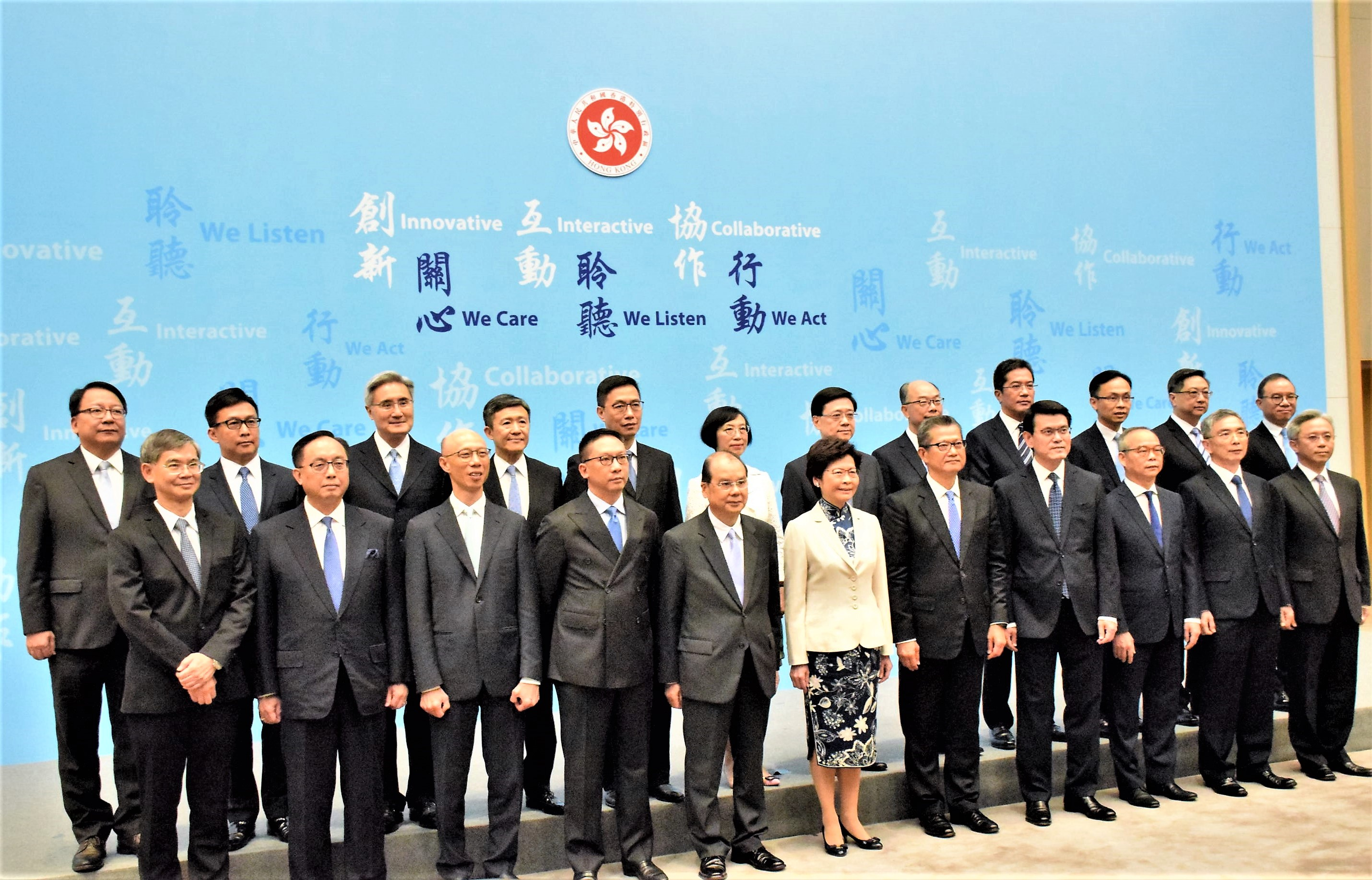
- Carrie Lam with her cabinet on 22 June 2017
- Date formed: 1 July 2017
- Date dissolved: 30 June 2022

People and organisations
- CCP General Secretary (Note: The top position held by Xi Jinping is General Secretary of the Chinese Communist Party, thus the officeholder holds ultimate power and authority over party and state.): Xi Jinping
- Head of government: Carrie Lam
- Premier of China: Li Keqiang
- No. of ministers: 16
- Member parties: DAB, BPA, FTU, LP, NPP, PoD
- Status in legislature: Pro-Beijing majority (2017–2020); Pro-Beijing supermajority (2020–2022)
- Opposition party: Pro-democracy camp

History
- Election: 2017 Chief Executive election
- Legislature terms: 6th Legislative Council; 7th Legislative Council
- Predecessor: Leung government
- Successor: Lee government

The administration of Carrie Lam as Chief Executive of Hong Kong, or Lam administration, officially referred to as "The 5th term Chief Executive of Hong Kong" relates to the period of governance of Hong Kong headed by Chief Executive Carrie Lam, between 1 July 2017 and 30 June 2022.

== Election ==
In the 2017 Chief Executive election, Lam received 777 votes in the 1,194-member Election Committee, beating former Financial Secretary John Tsang's 365 votes and retired judge Woo Kwok-hing's 21 votes. Lam was the first female Chief Executive in history, higher than Leung's 689 votes in the last election. She also became the first Chief Executive elected without being the most popular candidate, as she had been trailing behind Tsang in the polls. She pledged to "heal the social divide" and "unite our society to move forward" in her victory speech.

Lam received the appointment from Chinese Premier Li Keqiang on 11 April 2017.

== Transitional period ==
The Hong Kong government established the Office of the Chief Executive-elect ahead of the election with a controversial decision to site the temporary office in Hong Kong's most expensive business area in Champion Tower on Garden Road, Central. Former postmaster general Jessie Ting Yip Yin-mei was appointed as the head of the office.

One day after Lam vowed to "heal the social divide" in her victory speech, Chief Executive Leung Chun-ying's government pressed charges against nine key players in the 2014 Occupy protests, immediately sparking controversy whether Leung embarrassed Lam. Leung also blocked Carrie Lam's pledge to scrap Territory-wide System Assessment (TSA) for Primary Three pupils.

On 4 May 2017, former Director of Immigration Eric Chan was appointed the Director of the Office of the Chief Executive-elect as well as the Office of the Chief Executive she was sworn in after 1 July.

== Cabinet ==
Carrie Lam announced her new cabinet on 21 June 2017, with six incumbent ministers keep their portfolios including the three top secretaries. The cabinet was reshuffled twice in 2020 and 2021.

=== Ministry ===
Portfolio	Minister	Took office	Left office	Party
Chief Executive	Carrie Lam	1 July 2017	30 June 2022	Nonpartisan
Chief Secretary for Administration	Matthew Cheung	16 January 2017	25 June 2021	Nonpartisan
Chief Secretary for Administration	John Lee	25 June 2021	7 April 2022	Nonpartisan
Financial Secretary	Paul Chan	16 January 2017	Lee	Nonpartisan
Secretary for Justice	Rimsky Yuen	1 July 2012	6 January 2018	Nonpartisan
Secretary for Justice	Teresa Cheng	6 January 2018	30 June 2022	Nonpartisan
Secretary for the Environment	Wong Kam-sing	1 July 2012	30 June 2022	Nonpartisan
Secretary for Innovation and Technology	Nicholas Yang	20 November 2015	22 April 2020	Nonpartisan
Secretary for Innovation and Technology	Alfred Sit	22 April 2020	30 June 2022	Nonpartisan
Secretary for Home Affairs	Lau Kong-wah	21 July 2015	22 April 2020	DAB
Secretary for Home Affairs	Caspar Tsui	22 April 2020	24 February 2022	DAB
Secretary for Financial Services and the Treasury	James Lau	1 July 2017	22 April 2020	Nonpartisan
Secretary for Financial Services and the Treasury	Christopher Hui	22 April 2020	Lee	DAB
Secretary for Labour and Welfare	Law Chi-kwong	1 July 2017	30 June 2022	Nonpartisan
Secretary for the Civil Service	Joshua Law	1 July 2017	22 April 2020	Nonpartisan
Secretary for the Civil Service	Patrick Nip	22 April 2020	30 June 2022	Nonpartisan
Secretary for Security	John Lee	1 July 2017	25 June 2021	Nonpartisan
Secretary for Security	Chris Tang	25 June 2021	Lee	Nonpartisan
Secretary for Transport and Housing	Frank Chan	1 July 2017	30 June 2022	Nonpartisan
Secretary for Food and Health	Sophia Chan	1 July 2017	30 June 2022	Nonpartisan
Secretary for Commerce and Economic Development	Edward Yau	1 July 2017	30 June 2022	Nonpartisan
Secretary for Development	Michael Wong	1 July 2017	30 June 2022	Nonpartisan
Secretary for Education	Kevin Yeung	1 July 2017	30 June 2022	Nonpartisan
Secretary for Constitutional and Mainland Affairs	Patrick Nip	1 July 2017	22 April 2020	Nonpartisan
Secretary for Constitutional and Mainland Affairs	Erick Tsang	22 April 2020	Lee	Nonpartisan

=== Other posts ===
- Commissioner of Police: Stephen Lo (2017–2019), Chris Tang (2019–2021), Raymond Siu (2021–present)
- Commissioner of the Independent Commission Against Corruption: Simon Peh
- Director of Audit: David Sun (2017–2018), John Chu (2018–present)
- Commissioner of Customs and Excise: Hermes Tang (2017–2021), Louise Ho (2021–present)
- Director of Immigration: Erick Tsang (2017–2020), Au Ka-wang (2020–present)

=== Executive Council non-official members ===
Members	Affiliation	Portfolio	Assumed office	Left office	Born in	Ref
Bernard Chan	Nonpartisan	Non-official Convenor of the ExCo	1 July 2012	30 June 2022	1951	
Laura Cha	Nonpartisan	Chairman of the Financial Services Development Council	19 October 2004	30 June 2022	1949	
Arthur Li	Nonpartisan	Chairman of the Council of the University of Hong Kong	1 July 2012	Lee	1945	
Chow Chung-kong	Nonpartisan	Chairman of the Hong Kong Exchanges and Clearing	1 July 2012	30 June 2022	1950	
Fanny Law	Nonpartisan	Chairman of the Board of Directors of the Hong Kong Science and Technology Parks	1 July 2012	30 June 2022	1953	
Jeffrey Lam	BPA	Legislative Council Member & Vice-chairman of BPA	17 October 2012	Lee	1951	
Ip Kwok-him	DAB	Hong Kong Deputy to the National People's Congress & former vice-chairman of DAB	17 March 2016	30 June 2022	1951	
Martin Liao	Nonpartisan	Legislative Council Member	25 November 2016	Lee	1957	
Tommy Cheung	Liberal	Legislative Council Member, Chairman of Liberal Party	25 November 2016	Lee	1949	
Joseph Yam	Nonpartisan	Executive Vice President of the China Society for Finance and Banking	1 July 2017	Lee	1948	
Lam Ching-choi	Nonpartisan	Chairman of the Elderly Commission	1 July 2017	Lee	1960	
Regina Ip	NPP	Legislative Council Member & Chairperson of NPP	1 July 2017	Lee	1950	
Ronny Tong	Path of Democracy	Senior Counsel & Convenor of Path of Democracy	1 July 2017	Lee	1950	
Wong Kwok-kin	FTU	Legislative Council Member & former Chairman of FTU	1 July 2017	30 June 2022	1952	
Kenneth Lau	BPA	Legislative Council Member & Chairman of Heung Yee Kuk	1 July 2017	Lee	1966	
Horace Cheung	DAB	Legislative Council Member & Vice-chairman of DAB	1 July 2017	30 June 2022	1974	

== Extra funding ==
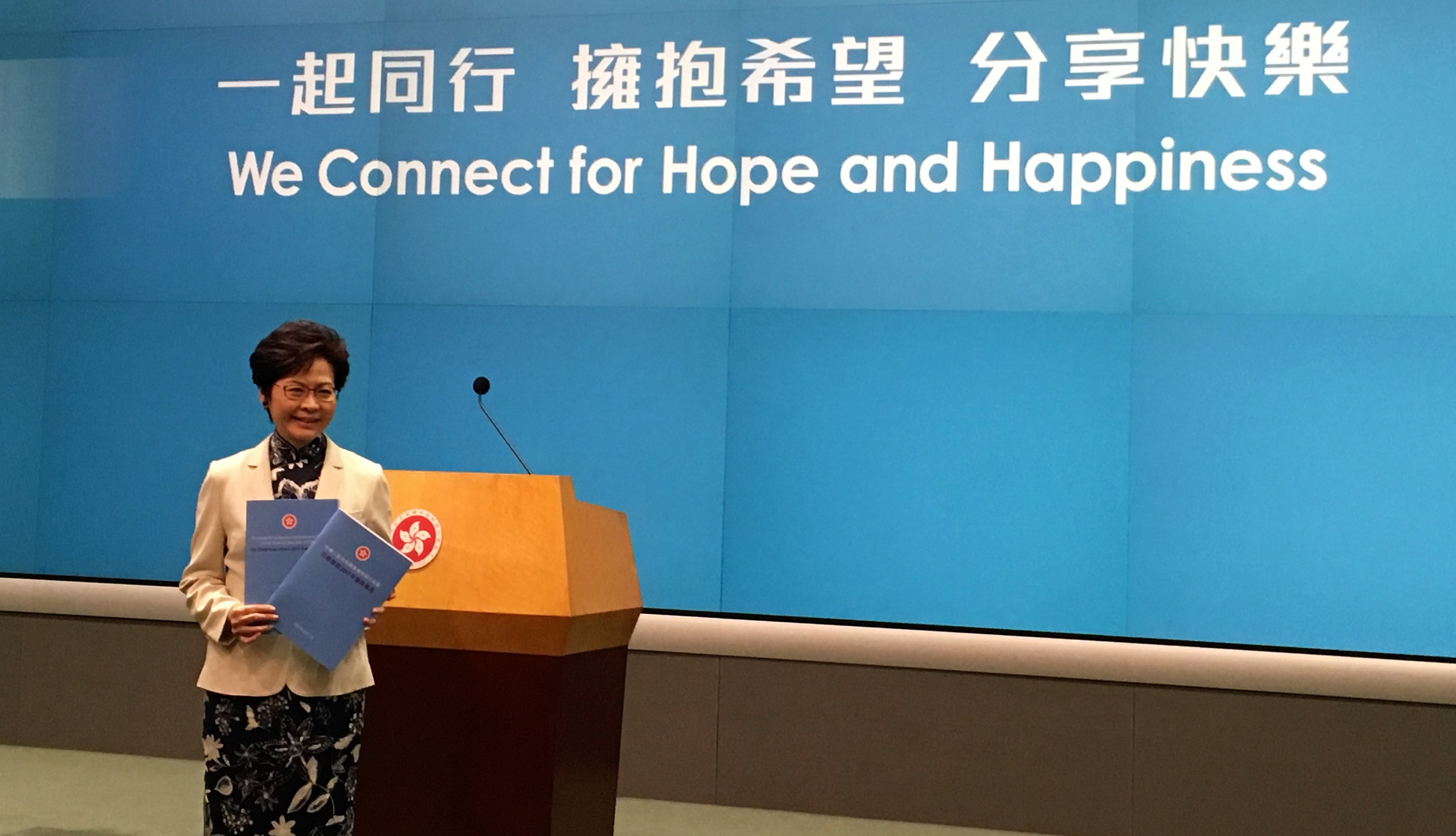
Carrie Lam announced her first policy address in October 2017.

In her first week in office, Carrie Lam offered subsidies to around 40,000 secondary school leavers and promised permanent jobs for more than 2,300 teachers and promised that she would spend the extra HK$5 billion a year on education.

In January 2018, Lam again handed out HK$500 million in extra funding to the Hong Kong's public hospitals amid the deluge of winter flu cases and a severe shortage of nursing staff. The funds would be drawn by the Hong Kong Hospital Authority from its own reserve of HK$1 billion and would later be reimbursed by the government in the financial year 2018/19.

== Oath-taking controversy ==
The legal action by the former Chief Executive Leung Chun-ying and Secretary for Justice Rimsky Yuen had resulted in the unseating of four more pro-democracy legislators, Leung Kwok-hung, Nathan Law, Yiu Chung-yim and Lau Siu-lai on 14 July 2017 after two pro-independence legislators Sixtus Leung and Yau Wai-ching were ousted from the legislature earlier in November 2016. The event caused the quick deterioration of the relations between the pro-democracy camp and the government after the strained relations had been improved compared to Lam's predecessor. Lam pledged she would not target more pro-democrats in oath-taking controversy.

== Suppression on localist and pro-independence movement ==
=== Localist candidates' disqualification ===
In the 2018 Legislative Council by-election after the qualification, the candidacy of Demosistō standing committee member Agnes Chow, was invalidated by the returning officer as she claimed that "the candidate cannot possibly comply with the requirements of the relevant electoral laws, since advocating or promoting 'self-determination' is contrary to the content of the declaration that the law requires a candidate to make to uphold the Basic Law and pledge allegiance to the [Hong Kong Special Administrative Region]." The European Union issued a statement warning that banning Chow from the by-election "risks diminishing Hong Kong’s international reputation as a free and open society". Carrie Lam defended the returning officer's decision, but denied that she had anything to do with the returning officer, stating that "there are absolutely no grounds for that sort of accusation or allegation of pressure."

In the November 2018 Kowloon West by-election, the candidacy of the ousted legislator Lau Siu-lai was also disqualified by the Returning Officer as her advocated for "self-determination" on her 2016 electoral platform. Her ally and elected legislator Eddie Chu, who signed the same statement in the 2016 election, was also barred from running in the rural representative election in December 2018. Lam supported the Returning Officer's decision that "had been made in accordance with the Rural Representative Election Ordinance."

=== Banning on pro-independence party ===
In July 2018, the Hong Kong Police Force unprecedentedly served the convenor of the pro-independence Hong Kong National Party Chan Ho-tin a notice under the Societies Ordinance and sought to ban the Party. The police claimed that the party has engaged in sedition and that the party may be banned on grounds of national security with respect to Chinese territorial integrity. The notice contained highly detailed surveillance material on the party leadership's public engagements. On 24 October 2018, Chan Ho-tin and party spokesman Jason Chow Ho-fai filed appeals against the ban with the Chief Executive and Executive Council. The two filed separate appeals to make clear they were acting as individuals, not as a party.

In August, a controversy erupted in 2018 when the Foreign Correspondents' Club (FCC) hosted a lunchtime talk with Chan Ho-tin on 14 August. A Financial Times journalist Victor Mallet, vice-chairman of the press organisation, chaired the session. The event was opposed by the governments of China and Hong Kong, because the issue of independence supposedly crossed one of the "bottom lines" on national sovereignty. Upon returning to Hong Kong after a visit to Bangkok, Mallet was denied a working visa by the Hong Kong government. Mallet was subjected to a four-hour interrogation by immigration officers on his return from Thailand on Sunday 7 October before he was finally allowed to enter Hong Kong on a seven-day tourist visa. Carrie Lam refused to make any comment, only stating that the Immigration Department was not obliged to explain individual cases.

== Infrastructure projects ==
=== Express Rail Link co-location plan ===
The proposed "co-location arrangement" of the Guangzhou–Shenzhen–Hong Kong Express Rail Link has sparked concerns that it might constitute a breach of the Hong Kong Basic Law and undermine Hong Kong's autonomy of "one country, two systems", participially with immigration control. Under the arrangement, mainland customs officers will be allowed to set up checkpoints and exercise jurisdiction at the West Kowloon station.

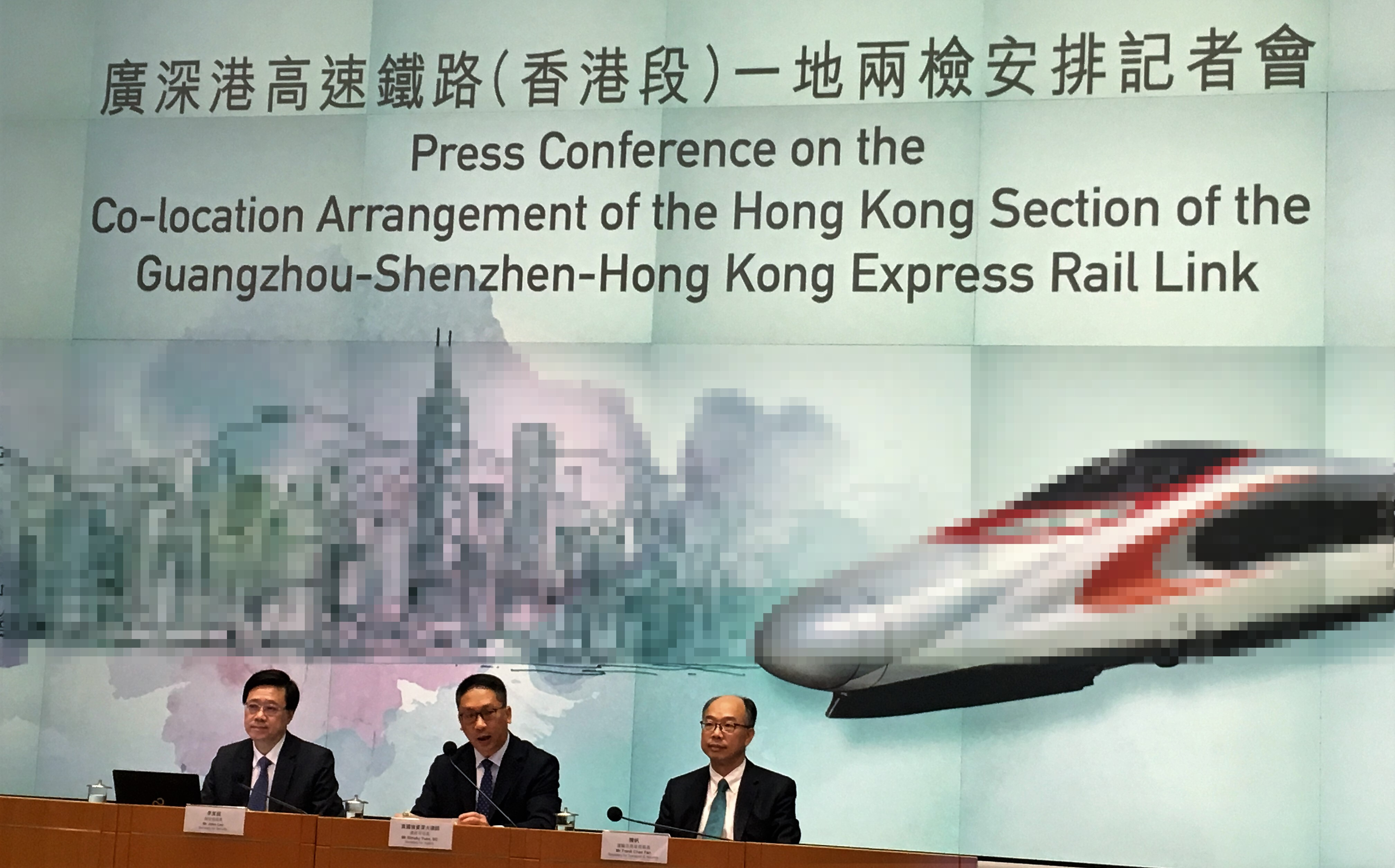
The government announced the implementation of co-location arrangement on 25 July 25, 2017.

On 28 December 2017, the Hong Kong Bar Association criticised the arrangement for distortion of the Basic Law, stating it damages the rule of law in Hong Kong as Article 18 was clearly written and leaves no room for any interpretation which would allow Chinese law to apply in any certain part of HKSAR. Since there is no legal basis, confidence in the "one country, two systems" principle will decline. The Hong Kong government has defended the co-location agreement, stating that rule of law isn't damaged nor does undermine the Basic Law. Carrie Lam responded to criticism by stating "some Hong Kong legal professionals have an elitist mentality or double standards, that is, they think that Hong Kong’s legal system is supreme, and that the mainland legal system – a big country with a 1.3 billion population – is wrong." Her statement prompted widespread disbelief as she appeared to defend China's legal system being better than Hong Kong's legal system, hypocrisy as she herself is seen as an elite out of touch with society, damaged the one country, two systems principle and for attacking the character rather the arguments of Hong Kong's top lawyers.

The long-debated plan was finally passed on 14 June 2018 in the Legislative Council by 40 to 20 votes after Legislative Council President Andrew Leung capped debate time for the bill at 36 hours to counter pro-democrats' filibustering. The cross-border Express Rail Link was opened on 22 September 2018, followed by the opening of another cross-border infrastructure Hong Kong–Zhuhai–Macau Bridge on 23 October 2018 by paramount leader Xi Jinping. Lam entering the venue side-by-side with Xi and ahead of Macau Chief Executive Fernando Chui and First Vice Premier Han Zheng. The entrance raised eyebrows among those who saw it as a departure from protocol for her to walk in front of top mainland officials.

=== Lantau Tomorrow Vision ===
In October 2018, Lam launched a development plan in her second policy address which suggested the construction of artificial islands with a total area of about 1,700 hectares through massive land reclamation near Kau Yi Chau and Hei Ling Chau of the eastern waters of Lantau Island. The project meets with controversies and opposition for its high cost of estimated HK$500 billion (US$63.8 billion) – amounting to half of the city's fiscal reserves, as well as environmental concerns.

== National Anthem Bill ==
The Hong Kong government has proposed the local implementation of the National Anthem Law of the People's Republic of China. Lam dismissed the calls for a public consultation for the controversial bill as some provisions deemed as too vague by the pro-democrats. Lam stated that "I do not understand why one has to insist on the term 'public consultation'," calling the term only a "label". She also insisted the proposed bill only targets people who deliberately insult the national anthem and the residents not to worry about it.

== Late 2018 to early 2019 crises ==
=== UGL case closure ===
On 12 December 2018, the Independent Commission Against Corruption (ICAC) announced it would not take any "further investigative action" against Leung Chun-ying over his recipient of HK$50 million from the Australian engineering firm UGL, ending the four-year marathon probe. The Department of Justice also issued a statement claiming there was "insufficient evidence to support a reasonable prospect of conviction" against Leung for any criminal offence.

Carrie Lam defended Secretary for Justice Teresa Cheng who was strongly criticised for not following the conventional procedure of seeking external legal advice in the UGL case. Lam said Cheng had made a profession call and she hoped the UGL saga, which had been a point of contention for four years, could finally end.

=== Age threshold of the Elderly CSSA ===
In January 2019, the Lam administration announced that the age threshold for elderly Comprehensive Social Security Assistance (CSSA) would jump from 60 to 65, starting in February. She faced opposition from both the pro-Beijing and pro-democracy legislators, in which she responded that it was the Legislative Council who approved the change in the CSSA scheme, as part of the 2018 Budget. Her remarks attracted backlashes from the legislators as well as the public. On 18 January, Lam backed down by announcing that people affected would get a new employment support supplement that would cover the cut. The Lam government also made a U-turn by suspending the controversial plan to impose a HK$200 penalty on Hong Kong's senior citizens claiming welfare payments without joining a job programme.

=== $4,000 handout controversy ===
The government was also under fire by the HK$4,000 handout scheme proposed in the 2018 Budget in which adult residents would get up to HK$4,000 if they do not own property or get government benefits. The application procedure was criticised for being too complicated. Applicants were initially required to provide an address proof. Facing the criticism, the government later waived the address proof requirement.

Amid the UGL case and the mismanagements, the average score of Carrie Lam further plunged to a new low in mid January to 50.9 in the poll by the University of Hong Kong, dropping 5.5 points from the previous month. Her net approval rating fell 21 percentage points to a new low. In another poll conducted by Chinese University of Hong Kong, Lam scored the lowest point of only 50.9 per cent – 1.8 percentage points lower than the previous month. Lam softened her tone after the widespread criticism. "The implementation of these measures has made people question the ability of this administration to govern," Lam said. "I completely accept this criticism."

=== Cross-harbour tunnel toll plan ===
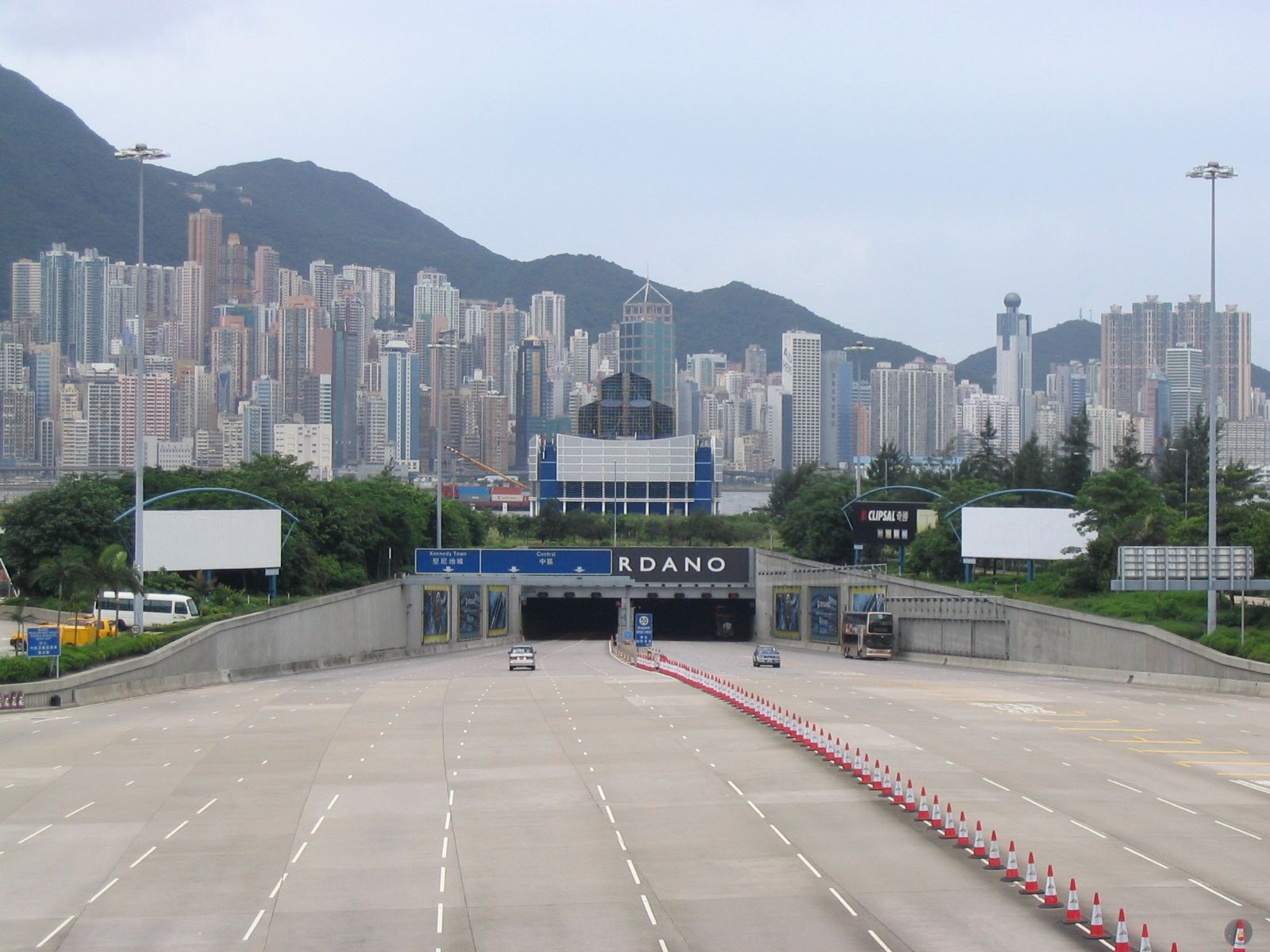
The January 2019 cross-harbour tunnel toll plan aiming at resolved the underuse of Western Harbour Tunnel sparked a controversy.

The Lam administration first presented a cross-harbour tunnel toll plan in January 2019 to balance the traffic between the three cross-harbour tunnels by raising tolls at the publicly operated overused Cross-Harbour Tunnel and Eastern Harbour Tunnel, while lowering them for the privately run Western Harbour Tunnel which was underused because of its higher charges. But Secretary for Transport and Housing Frank Chan abruptly withdrew it after strong opposition from the Legislative Council. The government made two changes to the motion in the hope of getting more support, but legislators across the political spectrum remained unconvinced. In March, Carrie Lam said her government has decided to shelve the plan for the second time as the government could not get enough votes in the legislature, symbolising the first defeat of the Lam administration.

== Extradition bill controversy ==
A 19-year-old Hong Kong resident being arrested and tried in Taiwan for killing his 20-year-old girlfriend in 2018 sparked the debate of Hong Kong's fugitive law. At present, the two ordinances, the Fugitive Offenders Ordinance and Mutual Legal Assistance in Criminal Matters Ordinance, are not applicable to the requests for surrender of fugitive offenders and mutual legal assistance between Hong Kong and mainland China, Macau and Taiwan and therefore the government does not have any legislation enabling it to request for extraditing the suspect. In February 2019, the government proposed a changes to fugitive laws to plug the "legal loophole" by establishing a mechanism for case-by-case transfers of fugitives to any jurisdiction with which the city lacks a formal extradition treaty.

Opposition expressed fears about the city opening itself up to the long arm of mainland Chinese law and Hongkongers could be victimised under a different legal system and urged the government to establish an extradition arrangement with Taiwan only. The business community also raised concerns over the mainland's court system. The American Chamber of Commerce (AmCham) criticised that mainland's "criminal process is plagued by deep flaws, including lack of an independent judiciary, arbitrary detention, lack of fair public trial, lack of access to legal representation and poor prison conditions". The Liberal Party and the Business and Professionals Alliance for Hong Kong, the two pro-business parties, suggested 15 economic crimes being exempted from the 46 offences covered by the extradition proposal. The government backed down on proposal to after business chambers voice concern by exempting nine economic crimes. Only offences punishable by at least three years in prison would trigger the transfer of a fugitive, up from the previously stated one year.

Three human rights groups, the Amnesty International, Hong Kong Human Rights Monitor, and Human Rights Watch opposed the bill, warning the extradition proposal could be used as a tool to intimidate critics of the Hong Kong or Chinese governments, peaceful activists, human rights defenders and putting those extradited at risk of torture or ill-treatment. On 28 April, estimated 130,000 protesters joined the march against proposed extradition law. The turnout was the largest since an estimated 510,000 joined the annual July 1 protest in 2014.

Lam also said the mainland was never intentionally excluded from the extradition laws ahead of the handover of Hong Kong in 1997. "It was not what was said, that there were fears over the mainland’s legal system after the handover, or that China had agreed to it. This is all trash talk," Lam said. But her claim was refuted by last colonial governor of Hong Kong Chris Patten and last colonial Chief Secretary Anson Chan.

On 24 May, 11 European Union representatives met with Carrie Lam to carry out a démarche formally protesting against the bill. On the same day, eight commissioners from the U.S. Congressional-Executive Commission on China (CECC) wrote to Chief Executive Carrie Lam asking that the bill be "withdrawn from consideration", stating that "the proposed legislation would irreparably damage Hong Kong's cherished autonomy and protections for human rights by allowing the Chinese government to request extradition of business persons, journalists, rights advocates, and political activists residing in Hong Kong." The commissioners added that the bill could "negatively impact the unique relationship between the U.S. and Hong Kong" – referring to the longstanding U.S. policy of giving the city preferential treatment over mainland China based on the United States-Hong Kong Policy Act.

Lam survived the first motion of no-confidence against her with the backing of the pro-Beijing majority in the legislature on 29 May. Democratic Party legislator Andrew Wan who moved the motion claimed that Lam "blatantly lied" about the extradition bill and misled the public and the international community, as Lam claimed that colonial officials did not deliberately exclude China from extradition laws ahead of the 1997 handover. He also called Lam to resign as her popularity reaching a new low in a recent poll.

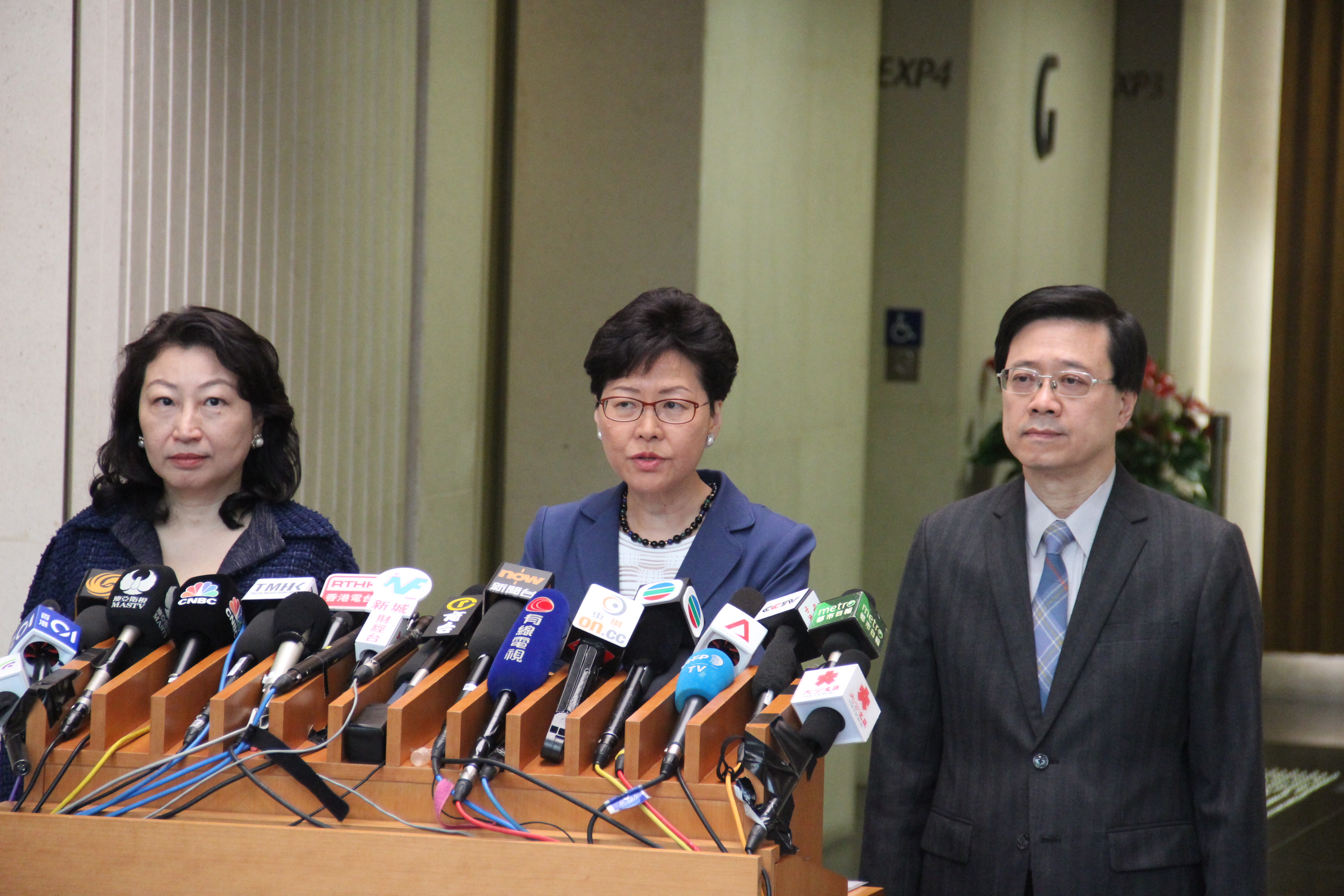
Carrie Lam at the press conference with Secretary for Justice Teresa Cheng and Secretary for Security John Lee the day after the massive protest on 10 June which resulted in violent clashes between protesters and police.

On 9 June, a record breaking of 1.03 million protesters marched in the streets against the extradition bill and called for her to step down. Following the 10 June violent clashes, Lam spoke in the next morning, admitting that the size of the rally showed there were "clearly still concerns" over the bill but refused to withdraw the bill. She refused to draw in to the questions of whether she would fulfil her promise that she would resign "if mainstream opinion makes me no longer able to continue the job" in her 2017 Chief Executive election campaign, only saying that it was important to have a stable governing team "at a time when our economy is going to undergo some very severe challenges because of external uncertainties." On 12 June, the protest outside the government headquarters later descended into violent clashes with the police. Amid the clashes, Lam appeared in a TVB interview where Lam was in tears when she was asked if she betrayed Hong Kong, "I grew up with all Hong Kong people and my love for this place has prompted me to make many personal sacrifices." Instead of selling out Hong Kong, she said her husband had told her that after she became Chief Executive she had "sold herself to Hong Kong". She said she had done nothing against her conscience and would not withdraw the bill. However within three hours, Lam released another video with a turn of the tone, strongly reprimanding protesters for the "blatant, oragnised riot" and condemning it as "not an act of love for Hong Kong."

After the intense violent clashes, Carrie Lam finally backed down and announced a pause in the passage of the extradition bill on 15 June. She said that the Security Bureau would suspend the second reading of the bill and would not set a time frame on the seeking of public views. However, she dodged the question if she would step down and refused to apologise.

On 16 June, an estimation of nearly two million protesters as claimed by the organisers flooded the streets demanding a full withdrawal of the bill. The police says that there are 338,000 at its peak, but admitted that it should be more as only those on the original route were counted. The government issued a statement in the evening where Carrie Lam apologised to Hong Kong residents and promised to "sincerely and humbly accept all criticism and to improve and serve the public." A government source told to the South China Morning Post that with the administration making it clear that there was no timetable to relaunch the suspended bill, the legislation would die a "natural death" when the current term of the Legislative Council ended in July next year.

Amid the social upheaval, Lam saw her approval rating fall to a record low of 23% and her disapproval rise to 67%, according to a survey released by the University of Hong Kong's Public Opinion Programme. Her support rating was at 32.8 points, down from 63.6 points during her first week in office, the lowest any Chief Executive ever received. Support for the SAR government also fell to 18%, the lowest since the 2003 political crisis.

== After protest ==
The massive anti-government protest was cracked down following the implementation of the National Security Law by China, crushing dissidents and forcing the disband of civic groups. With the opposition being silenced and removing governing obstacles, Lam's cabinet was reshuffled twice in 2020 and 2021, promoting hardliners from the police, such as Chris Tang and John Lee, further instigating the concerns of transforming Hong Kong into a police state. New policies did not enjoy much popularity still, including requiring oath-taking pledging allegiance to China, vetting politicians, pushing for national security education, and placing pandemic restrictions. Lam announced not to campaign for re-election in April, paving way for John Lee, the Chief Secretary promoted by Lam and a former police, to succeed after receiving blessing from China.

== Notes ==
Preceded by CY Leung	Government of Hong Kong; 2017–present	Succeeded by Incumbent
