= Derek Jones (civil servant, born 1927) =

鍾信 Derek John Claremont Jones
- Born: 2 July 1927; United Kingdom
- Died: 4 October 2008 (aged 81); St Agnes, Cornwall, United Kingdom
- Occupations: British and Hong Kong government official

Derek John Claremont Jones CMG (Chinese: 鍾信; 2 July 1927 – 4 October 2008) was a British and Hong Kong government official and a Senior Fellow of the Trade Policy Research Centre in London. He originally served in the Civil Service and was posted to the Hong Kong Government in 1971. In Hong Kong, he was the first to hold the post of Secretary for Economic Services under the reform in 1973 and had served as Secretary for the Environment, Secretary for Transport and Official Legislative Councillor before he was posted to Brussels serving as Minister for Hong Kong Relations with European Community and Member States in 1982. He subsequently retired from the government in 1986.

== Early life ==
Jones was born in England, the United Kingdom on 2 July 1927 and was the eldest son of Albert Claremont Jones and Ethel Lilian Jones (née Hazell). He entered Colston School in Bristol and received further education in University of Bristol where he graduated with a BA degree. He later obtained a BSc degree with honours in economics in the London School of Economics and Political Science as well.

== British Government ==
Jones had served in the Royal Air Force from 1946 to 1948 before he joined the Civil Service in 1950. He was Economic Assistant in the Economic Section of the Cabinet Office from 1950 to 1953, a time when Sir Winston Churchill was still Prime Minister. From 1953 to 1955, he was posted to Paris serving as Second Secretary in the United Kingdom Delegation to the OEEC and NATO. After that, he returned to the homeland and became Assistant Principal of the Colonial Office from 1955 to 1957 and was later promoted as Principal of the Office from 1957 to 1966.

When the Colonial Office was abolished in 1966, Jones was transferred to the Commonwealth Office to serve as First Secretary. One year later, he was posted to the United Kingdom Mission in Geneva and became a Counsellor especially responsible for the trading affairs to Hong Kong.

== Hong Kong Government ==
In 1971, Jones was transferred to the Hong Kong government and became Deputy Economic Secretary under the Economic Services Branch of the Colonial Secretariat.

In 1973, the Hong Kong Government, under Governor Sir Murray MacLehose (later Lord), reformed its organisation according to the recommendations made in the McKinsey Report. A new form of structure, nicknamed "Mini-Cabinet" by the local newspapers, was introduced that six new government posts were rearranged. They were namely the Secretary for Home Affairs, Secretary for Housing, Secretary for the Environment, Secretary for Social Services, Secretary for Security and Secretary for Economic Services. Jones was appointed for the post of Secretary for Economic Services in November 1973, and became the Secretary for the Environment in September 1976. In September 1981, he was appointed as the newly created Secretary for Transport. However, he had served for only a few months before he was posted to Brussels and served as Minister for Hong Kong Relations with European Community and Member States in early 1982. He was replaced by Peter Tsao in May 1986 and retired from the government.

When he was Secretary of the Government, Jones was responsible to a number of issues including the construction of Tsuen Wan line of the MTR. Besides, he was also an Official Legislative Councillor from 1973 to 1982 and was member of various organisations and public bodies, such as the director of Kowloon Motor Bus, China Motor Bus and Hong Kong Industrial Estates Corporation, the chairman of the Advisory Committee on Environmental Protection, Transport Advisory Committee and Special Committee on Land Production and a member of the Oil Policy Committee. Jones was made Companion of the Order of St Michael and St George in the New Year Honours of 1979 for his public services.

== Later years ==
Jones was a Senior Fellow of the Trade Policy Research Centre in London from 1986 to 1990. Following that, he lived a quiet life in retirement. On 4 October 2008, he died peacefully in his sleep, after a short illness, in St Agnes, Cornwall. He was 81 and was buried in St Agnes Cemetery on 15 October.

== Family ==
Jones had two marriages. He married Jean Cynthia Withams firstly in 1951. The couple had one son and two daughters. He married Kay Cecile Thewlis in his second marriage in 1970 and they had one son. Jones interests included travel, reading and conversation.

== Conferment ==
- Justice of the Peace (official )
- Companion of the Order of St Michael and St George (CMG), 1979 New Year Honours)

== See also ==
- Cabinet Office
- Colonial Office
- Commonwealth Office
- Government of Hong Kong

== Footnotes ==
Political offices
Preceded by New Creation	Secretary for Economic Services; 1973–1976	Succeeded by David Jeaffreson
Preceded by James Robson	Secretary for the Environment; 1976–1981	Succeeded by Post Abolished
Preceded by New Creation	Secretary for Transport; 1981	Succeeded by Alan Scott
