= Culture, Sports and Tourism Bureau =

Policy bureau of the Hong Kong Special Administrative Region

- 文化體育及旅遊局

Agency overview
- Formed: 1 July 2022
- Jurisdiction: Government of Hong Kong
- Headquarters: Central Government Offices
- Agency executives: Rosanna Law, Secretary; Raistlin Lau, Under Secretary; Vivian Sum, Permanent Secretary; Alvin Chiu, Political Assistant
- Parent department: Chief Secretary for Administration
- Website: cstb.gov.hk

Culture, Sports and Tourism Bureau
- Traditional Chinese: 文化體育及旅遊局
- Simplified Chinese: 文化体育及旅游局
Transcriptions
Standard Mandarin
- Hanyu Pinyin: Wénhuà Tǐyù Jí Lǚyóu Jú
Yue: Cantonese
- Yale Romanization: Màhnfa táiyuhk kahp Léuihyàuh Gúk
- Jyutping: Man4 faa3 tai2 juk6 kap6 leoi5 jau4 guk6

Culture, Sports and Tourism Bureau (CSTB) is one of the fifteen policy bureaux of the Hong Kong Special Administrative Region. The bureau is responsible for the policy portfolios of culture, sports and tourism. The current Secretary for Culture, Sports and Tourism is Rosanna Law.

== Functions and responsibilities ==
=== The bureau ===
The overall vision of the bureau is to promote the integrated development of Hong Kong’s culture, sports and tourism, which are complements of each other. The elements should be holistically considered as a flourishing cultural and sports industry could attract tourists to visit Hong Kong, and the revenue generated by the tourism sector could be reinvested to promote the development of arts and cultural industries.

In accordance with the 14th Five-Year Plan, the bureau aimed to develop Hong Kong into an East-meets-West centre for international cultural exchange. The bureau implements the goal by attracting overseas and mainland Chinese artists, sportsmen and tourists to visit Hong Kong. Simultaneously, it encourages Hong Kong-based counterparts to visit mainland China and other overseas destinations for them to promote Chinese culture and tell good stories about Hong Kong and China.

The bureau aimed to promote better integration between Hong Kong and other parts of China. The Culture and Tourism Development Plan for the Guangdong-Hong Kong-Macao Greater Bay Area was promulgated to enable cultural exchanges among artists and creators across border.

=== The three divisions ===
The core functions of the Bureau in culture and arts are:

- Providing funding for institutions that promote Hong Kong’s arts and culture (e.g., the Hong Kong Academy for Performing Arts, public museums, and public libraries);
- Overseeing and managing funds available for those who are interested in promoting arts technology to apply (e.g., the Arts Capacity Development Funding Scheme under the Arts and Sports Development Fund (Arts Portion), the Film Development Fund, and the CreateSmart Initiative);
- Implementing measures to establish a wide cultural network in the Greater Pearl River Delta and with other countries (e.g., holding forums and meetings under the Mainland / Hong Kong Agreement on Closer Cultural Partnership Arrangement and the Hong Kong-Taiwan Cultural Co-operation Committee); and
- Supporting the preservation of intangible cultural heritage (e.g., Cantonese opera and the Tai Hang fire dragon dance).

The core functions of the Bureau in sports and recreation are:

- Promoting sports in the community (e.g., implementing the District Sports Programmes Funding Scheme and promoting sports in schools);
- Supporting elite sports (e.g., providing dual career and personal development support to elite athletes); and
- Promoting major international sports events.

The core functions of the Bureau in tourism are:

- Promoting Hong Kong as Asia’s premier international city and a world-class destination for leisure and business visitors;
- Regulating the tourism industry through the Travel Industry Authority to enhance the professionalism of trade; and
- Protecting the rights of travellers and enhancing Hong Kong’s reputation as a tourist-friendly city.

== History and reasons for government restructuring ==
The bureau was newly established under the re-organization of policy bureaux proposed by Carrie Lam, the fifth Chief Executive of Hong Kong, and was adopted by John Lee, the succeeding Chief Executive after Carrie Lam. The bureau was tasked with the responsibilities for the culture, sports and tourism portfolios. Previously these were managed by other bureaus: cultural, arts and sports affairs from the Home Affairs Bureau, and film, creative industries and tourism from the Commerce and Economic Development Bureau.

The history of bureau for culture includes the now-abolished Broadcasting, Culture and Sport Bureau (Chinese: 文康廣播局), which was responsible for managing Hong Kong's broadcasting services, developing the film and public entertainment industries, promoting Hong Kong's Arts and Culture, and providing support to sports and physical recreation facilities. It was headed by Secretary for Broadcasting, Culture and Sport. It was renamed from the Broadcasting, Culture and Sport Branch on 1 July 1997 due to the transfer of sovereignty over Hong Kong, and lasted until 9 April 1998, when it was restructured as the Information Technology and Broadcasting Bureau. From 1998 to 2022, the leisure and cultural portfolios were taken care of by the Home Affairs Bureau.

The 2022 restructuring consolidates the work of the former Home Affairs Bureau and the Commerce and Economic Development Bureau, which the government sees as creating synergies to foster the development of various types of arts, cultures and creative industries.

Setting up a new bureau dedicated to culture, sports and tourism also enhances intra-governmental coordination in formulating and implementing policies relating to Hong Kong’s cultural, sports and tourism industries.

After the latest reform, government departments, advisory boards and statutory bodies (for example, the Leisure and Cultural Services Department, formerly led by the Home Affairs Bureau, the Hong Kong Arts Development Council, and the Hong Kong Film Development Council) are led by the bureau. This new arrangement was considered desirable as it strengthened the promotion of cultural industries in Hong Kong.

The need for a top-level leadership which oversees the promotion of Hong Kong’s cultural development also emerges from the 14th Five-Year Plan, which supports the positioning of Hong Kong as an East-meets-West centre for international cultural exchange.

In August 2022, the bureau set a limit on the number of people who able to participate in mass sporting events, causing some events to be cancelled or restricted.

== Organizational structure ==
=== Subordinate branches ===
The following are the branches of the bureau:

- Culture Branch
- West Kowloon Cultural District Project Management Team
- Tourism Commission
- Cultural and Creative Industries Development Agency
- Sports and Recreational Branch

=== Subordinate departments ===
- Leisure and Cultural Services Department

=== Related Organizations ===
- Hong Kong Maritime Museum
- Hong Kong Philharmonic Orchestra
- Hong Kong Repertory Theatre
- Hong Kong Chinese Orchestra
- Hong Kong Dance Company
- Chung Ying Theatre Company
- City Contemporary Dance Company
- Hong Kong Ballet
- Exploration Theatre
- Hong Kong Sinfonietta
- Hong Kong Festival Fringe Limited
- Hong Kong Arts Festival Society
- Outward Bound Hong Kong
- Hong Kong Sports Institute Limited
- Sports Federation and Olympic Committee of Hong Kong, China
- Hong Kong Paralympic Committee
- Hong Kong Arts Development Council
- Fringe Club
- Zuni Icosahedron
- West Kowloon Cultural District Authority
- Hong Kong Design Centre

== Controversies ==
=== National Anthem Controversy ===
==== Background ====
Since 2022, several incidents took place concerning the mix-up of the Chinese national anthem a song linked to the 2019 anti-government protests. The latter was occasionally played as the “Hong Kong national anthem” or the song representing Hong Kong in sports ceremonies. During the 2023 Ice Hockey World Championship Division III Group B match in Sarajevo, Bosnia and Herzegovina, “Glory to Hong Kong” was played instead of the Chinese national anthem, "March of the Volunteers", after Hong Kong's victory over Iran. Several Hong Kong players made the “time out” gesture to stop the song from playing.

==== Condemnation from CSTB and disciplinary actions by SF&OC ====
Following the incident, the Hong Kong Special Administrative Region (HKSAR) Government released a statement, strongly deploring the mistake made and formally requesting the Sports Federation & Olympic Committee of Hong Kong, China (SF&OC) to conduct a thorough investigation. This investigation is intended to scrutinize whether the relevant national sports association, as per the guidelines, undertook on-site verification with the event organizer to ensure the accuracy of the National Anthem.

In response to the unfolding events, the SF&OC launched the proceedings to suspend the membership of the Hong Kong Ice Hockey Association (HKIHA) within the organization and emphasizes the need for accountability within the sporting community, which is supported by the Culture, Sports, and Tourism Bureau (CSTB). CSTB, in alignment with the HKSAR Government, concurrently calls upon the HKIHA to provide a comprehensive written explanation regarding the incident concerning the erroneous playing of the National Anthem of the People's Republic of China.

Secretary Kevin Yeung emphasised that the HKIHA needed to submit a report within a month detailing plans to improve its governance. Failure to do so, he indicated, might result in funding cuts. Additionally, the HKIHA is urged to submit a robust plan outlining improvements to its corporate governance.

==== Concerns about HKIHA's subsidies after suspension ====
Concerns arose as to the funding and subsidies HKIHA may receive after the suspension of the association’s membership. Yeung assured athletes that their funding and participation in international competitions would not be affected by the government’s decision to cut HKIHA's budget as a penalty for the anthem mix-up, expressing support for the development of sports in Hong Kong.

HKIHA acknowledged the need for governance improvements and indicated a willingness to work towards preventing similar incidents. However, they expressed worries about any funding cuts and their potential negative impacts on athletes' training and development. They highlighted the cancellation of their elite athlete scheme and the potential need to raise funds independently to ensure athletes could still participate in competitions. Bob Ngan, one of the players in the match, believed the move to punish the association for a mistake by the organiser of the match was “unreasonable”, and the national anthem row had shifted attention away from the good result of the Hong Kong team. The potential cut in subsidies could hamper the development of ice hockey, said Ngan.

Eventually, in May 2023, Kevin Yeung said CSTB "will ask the SF&OC to impose an appropriate penalty” to HKIHA to put an end to the national anthem mix-up incident. HKIHA was later reprimanded by SF&OC over the incident, but the latter decided that there would be no cuts to its funding or suspension of its membership. Yeung supported the SF&OC’s decision and stated that it was “completely reasonable and justifiable” for the SF&OC to ask the HKIHA to work on its corporate governance.

==== Updated Guidelines for all Sports Associations ====
According to the amended guidelines, sports teams are mandated to boycott awards ceremonies if the team leader is not permitted to verify the national anthem or regional flags on-site. The SF&OC has outlined a procedure involving the collection of an anthem toolkit, including flags and anthem copies, before each event. If event organizers decline to sign an acknowledgement form or permit checks, athletes are instructed to boycott the ceremony.

Under the new guidelines, all National Sports Associations (NSAs) must collect an anthem toolkit from SF&OC before departing for international events. This toolkit includes two regional flags, hard copies of the anthem (either on disks or a USB drive), and an acknowledgement receipt for organizers to sign. The team leader is responsible for verifying the correctness of the anthem and flag.

In case of an anthem or flag-related error, the team leader is expected to object and call for a halt by displaying a "time-out" gesture. If immediate correction is not made, the team is advised to leave the ceremonial venue. The team leader is then required to report the incident to the SF&OC within two hours by phone, submitting a brief written report the following working day. Non-compliance with the guidelines may lead to sanctions for the concerned NSAs, including potential suspension of SF&OC membership and the withholding of government subvention or funding support.

=== National Games Coordination Office (NGCO) ===
The State Council of China announced in August 2021 that the 15th National Games will be co-hosted in Guangdong, Hong Kong, and Macau in 2025, the first time Hong Kong will have co-hosted the National Games. Since the announcement, the then Home Affairs Bureau and now CSTB have been liaising with the Chinese Central Government, and the governments of Guangdong Province and Macau to organise a “Simple, Safe and Wonderful” National Games. Under the arrangement, Hong Kong is likely to organize 8 sports events in the 2025 National Games.

On 3 October 2023, the Bureau announced the establishment of the National Games Coordination Office (NGCO) under the Bureau to fully take on the planning and implementation work of the 15th National Games of China. Yeung Tak-keung, the former Commissioner for Sports, was appointed as Head of NGCO on 16 October. A Steering Committee chaired by the Permanent Secretary for Culture, Sports and Tourism will also be set up in the fourth quarter of 2023 to carry out work in different areas. These include matters relating to immigration; security and accreditation; media, publicity and community relations; transport and traffic arrangements; and medical services.

=== Hong Kong Heritage Museum in Sha Tin ===
==== Background ====
On 6 December 2023, in a document submitted to the Legislative Council, the Bureau proposed to move the Hong Kong Science Museum to the site of the Hong Kong Heritage Museum in Sha Tin, close and relocate the Heritage Museum’s collection to other venues, as well as establish a new museum showcasing national successes at the current Science Museum location. The news caused controversies.

==== Cost-effectiveness ====
Regarding the cost-effectiveness analysis, on one hand, the bureau argued the opening of the new museum in the same location as the Science Museum can enjoy the “convenience in attracting visitors, the availability of large space and to shorten the overall construction time.” Secretary for Culture, Sports and Tourism Mr Yeung further supplemented that an internal review discovered that several exhibitions at the Heritage Museum might be better suited to being housed in future institutions that were yet to be completed, and more space is required to show exhibits of the Science Museum.”

On the contrary, members of the public questioned the need to demolish the Heritage Museum. Lawmaker Tik Chi-yuen criticized the bureau’s proposal was too complicated as “breaking up the Heritage Museum is absolutely not cost-effective, and having to move collections and exhibits of two existing institutions would not be involved if a new facility could be built.” Further, Professor Lau Chi-pang from Lingnan University expressed concerns over the government’s spending on multiple new museums.

==== Necessity for promoting Chinese cultures ====
Regarding the enablement of the new National Development Museum, on one hand, as mentioned in Chief Executive John Lee’s second 2023 Policy Address, the proposal read that the museum would “serve as a diversified educational platform, nurturing national identity and a societal appreciation of Chinese culture”. On the other hand, some questioned if the new museum is needed, considering the government “had already promoted the nation’s achievements in a ubiquitous manner.”

=== Re-opening of the Kai Tak Cruise Terminal ===
==== Poor Traffic Arrangement Leading to Long Waiting Hours ====
After a 3-year suspension of service since the pandemic in February 2020, the Kai Tak Cruise Terminal was re-opened in August 2023. On 5 August, Spectrum of the Seas moored at Kai Tak Cruise Terminal, bringing over 5,000 tourists to Hong Kong.

However, the massive influx of tourists together with the inherent traffic insufficiencies of the Cruise Terminal and the Kai Tak region has led to prolonged waiting hours for public transportation. There were 2 bus routes (22 and 22M) and 1 minibus (86) available for connecting the Cruise Pier with the festival walk and Kowloon Bay Station with a frequency of 30 minutes for each departure at the time. Upon the first arrival of the first cruise, tourists were required to line up, some for more than 3 hours, at the terminal for access to public transportation. Legislative Council member Jimmy Ng Wing-Ka raised the concern that unreasonably long waiting hours for public transportation at cruise terminals would damage the international image of Hong Kong.

==== Government’s Response ====
The government incurred over HKD590,000 in the second half of August 2023 for providing transportation vouchers to tourists and gas vouchers to incentivise taxi drivers. The government subsequently introduced temporal measures including special bus routes (20R, 22R & 25R) connecting the Cruise Terminal to nearby stations (Tsim Sha Tsui, Kai Tak & Kwun Tong) in the event of cruise mooring.

The then Secretary Kevin Yeung suggested that the government could not accurately forecast the requirement for transport and it could only allocate as many resources as possible. The official predicted waiting duration was 15 minutes with the introduction of one special route. However, foreign travellers on cruises preferred to pay by credit card for short stays and most public transportation could not support them. While taxi drivers were deterred from entering the Terminal for long waiting hours.

==== Criticism ====
The transportation arrangement of the Cruise Terminal attracted wide public attention and criticism. Non-officio convenor of the Executive Council, Regional Ip criticized that the poor transportation arrangement had persisted over a decade since the launch of the terminal while relevant governmental departments failed to address the issue effectively during the pandemic. Mrs Ip said the poor transportation arrangement rendered the terminal a 10-year catastrophe rather than a tourism opportunity and Kevin Yeung should be responsible for the chaos. Mrs Ip pointed out the ambiguous positioning of the cruise terminal which failed to fully utilize the facilities and accelerate tourism, over 80% of the shops in the terminal remained vacated, taxi drivers were reluctant to pick up customers at the terminal. She said that major government officials failed to discharge their duties and put the blame on construction contractor.

Chairman of the Legislative Council House Committee and member of the Standing Committee of the National People Congress, Starry Lee criticized Kevin Yeung’s poor vision in arranging facilities and services and unsatisfactory performance. She described the current Cruise Terminal as far below expectation and the government shall make a thorough plan to unleash the potential of the district.

Apart from transportation, the facilities of the Terminal were criticised as being insufficient and incapable of holding large vessels and tourists. Legislator Rebecca Chan Hoi-yan suggested that the lighting, basic facilities such as toilets and elevators could not support the influx of 5,000 tourists due to limited operators while merchants in the terminal have ceased operation over the pandemic, further hindering the operation of the terminal.
