= Rosanna Law =

Hong Kong government official

The Honourable Rosanna Law JP
- 羅淑佩
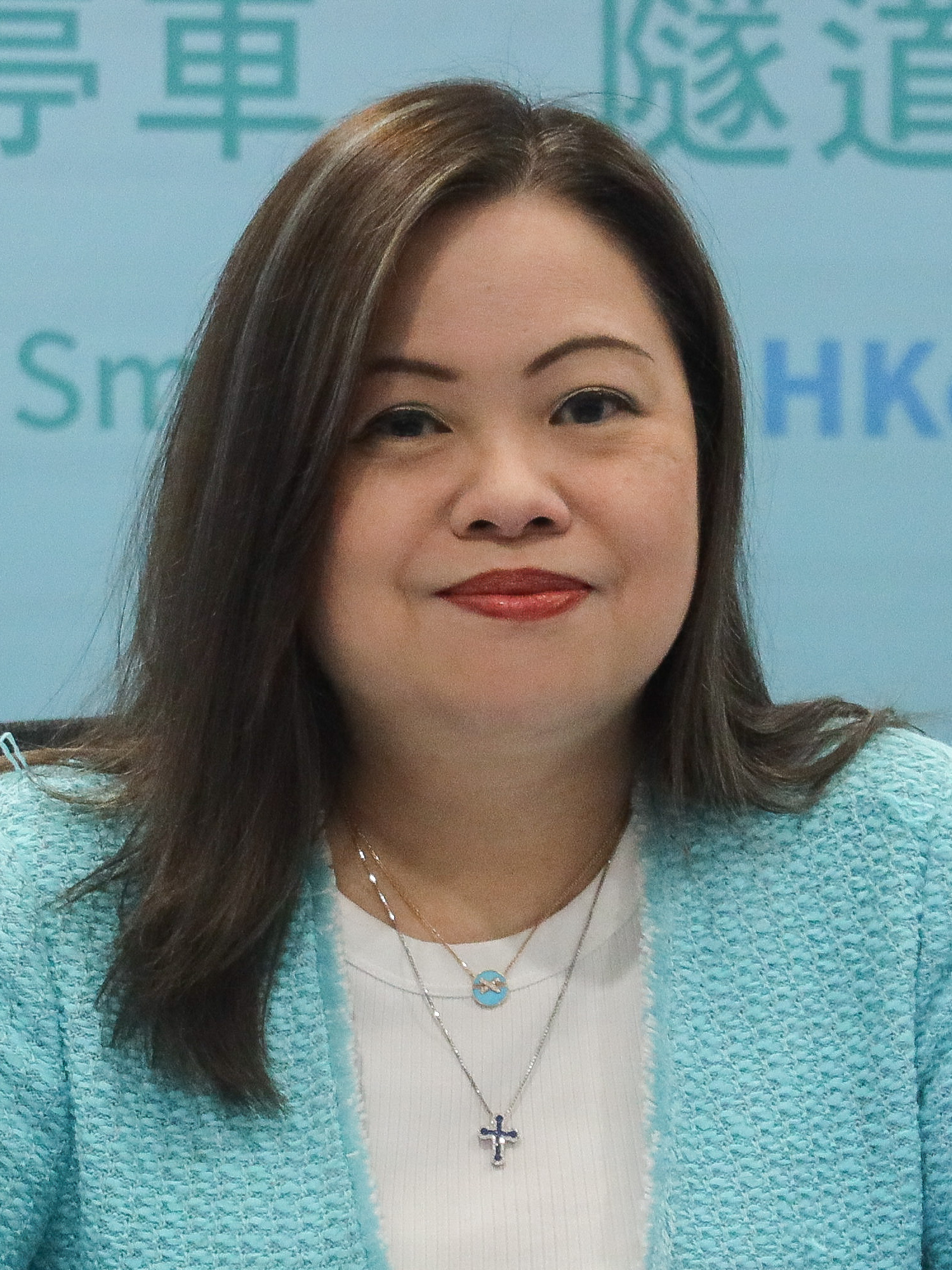
- Law in 2023

Secretary for Culture, Sports and Tourism
- Incumbent
- Assumed office 5 December 2024
- Chief Executive: John Lee
- Preceded by: Kevin Yeung

Permanent Secretary for Housing
- In office 15 August 2023 – 5 December 2024
- Preceded by: Agnes Wong
- Succeeded by: Charmaine Lee

Commissioner for Transport
- In office 9 September 2020 – 14 August 2023
- Preceded by: Mable Chan
- Succeeded by: Angela Lee

Personal details
- Education: Chinese University of Hong Kong

Rosanna Law Shuk-pui JP (Chinese: 羅淑佩) is a Hong Kong government official, the current Secretary for Culture, Sports and Tourism after occupying various positions in the civil service.

== Career ==
Law studied in Pope Paul VI College. She studied Social Sciences with a major of Government and Public Administration at Chinese University of Hong Kong and graduated in 1989, subsequently joining the civil service. She first worked as a Labour Officer and later as a Trade Officer, before entering the administrative officer team in 1990.

In 1998, she was appointed as the Principal Assistant Secretary for Constitutional Affairs. Later in 1999, she became the Assistant Director of Administration Wing under the Chief Secretary for Administration's Office. Assistant Director-General of Trade and Industry and Principal Assistant Secretary for the Environment, Transport and Works (Transport) were the posts she was appointed to during 2005 to 2010.

She was Deputy Commissioner for Tourism from August 2010 to September 2016, Deputy Secretary for Constitutional and Mainland Affairs from September 2016 to September 2020.

In 2020, Law was appointed Commissioner for Transport, succeeding Mable Chan who was promoted to permanent secretary. Policies initiated during her term include new electronic toll collection system HKeToll and time-varying toll arrangement for three cross-harbour tunnels in an attempt to divert traffic.

Three years later she was appointed Permanent Secretary for Housing (and Director of Housing), responsible for leading a crackdown on public housing abuses.

Rising to fame as the transport commissioner and housing director, Law enjoyed a strong media presence. As the John Lee government entered the second half of the tenure, the 56-year-old civil servant was promoted to Secretary for Culture, Sports and Tourism in December 2024, when the embattled Kevin Yeung was sacked in the reshuffle. John Lee, the chief executive, praised her and Mable Chan, who was also joining the cabinet, for their "leadership, the articulation skills and the proactivity". Regina Ip, the long-time politician and Executive Council convener, recalled when she decided to take in Law as trade officer, she found her wise and intelligent.

In November 2025, after Hong Kong lost to Singapore in a football match, Law said that her football strategy "differed quite significantly" from the coach-Ashley Westwood's strategy.

== Personal life ==
Law's interests are cooking and attending concerts. Law was a well-known "Hellosss", supporter of local boy band MIRROR's Ian Chan, and was seen attending concerts of the pop star. Law said she felt Chan, who was part of the national volleyball team, is talented and adorable. She also spoke of her appreciation of other Cantopop singers such as Alan Tam.
