= Eva Cheng =

- 鄭汝樺
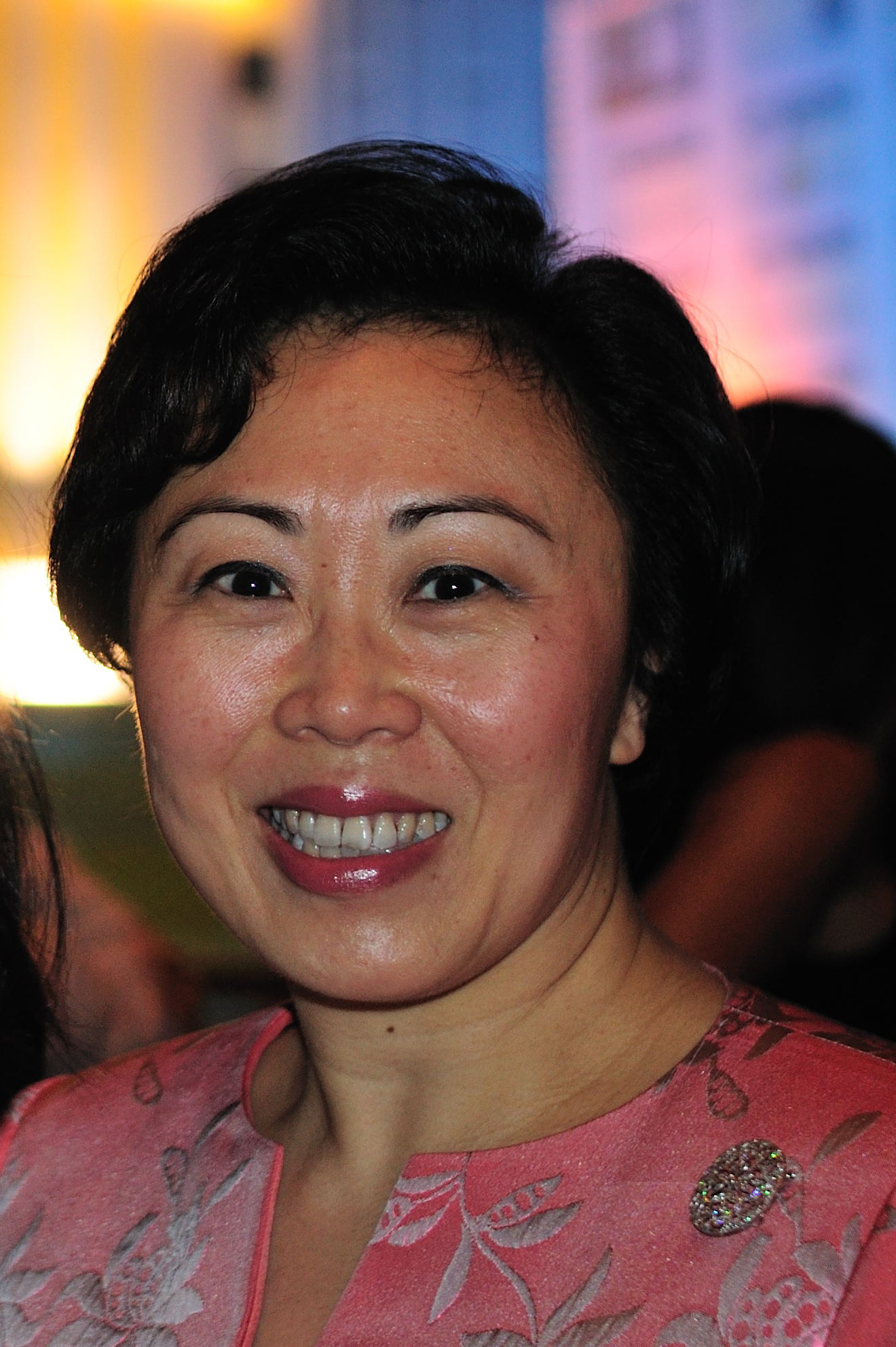
- Eva Cheng at the Diocesan Girls' School (DGS) 150th Anniversary Gala Dinner (2010)

Secretary for Transport and Housing
- In office 1 July 2007 – 30 June 2012
- Chief Executive: Sir Donald Tsang
- Chief Secretary: Henry Tang
- Undersecretary: Yau Shing-mu
- Permanent Secretary: Francis Ho & D. W. Pescod
- Preceded by: Sarah Liao (as Secretary for the Environment, Transport and Works); Michael Suen (as Secretary for Housing, Planning and Lands)
- Succeeded by: Anthony Cheung

Personal details
- Born: 31 May 1960 (age 66)
- Education: Diocesan Girls' School; University of Hong Kong (B.A.)

Chinese name
- Traditional Chinese: 鄭汝樺
- Simplified Chinese: 郑汝桦
Transcriptions
Standard Mandarin
- Hanyu Pinyin: Zhèng Rǔhuà
Yue: Cantonese
- Jyutping: zeng6 jyu5 waa4

Eva Cheng, GBS (Chinese: 鄭汝樺; born 31 May 1960, Hong Kong) is the former Secretary for Transport and Housing and the former chair of the Hong Kong Housing Authority in the Hong Kong Government.

She joined as a civil servant in the Administrative Service in 1983.

Cheng has served in various bureaux and departments in the government, including Deputy Head of the Central Policy Unit (1996–1998), Deputy Director of Administration (1997), Deputy Secretary for Information Technology and Broadcasting (later renamed Deputy Secretary for Commerce, Industry and Technology) (1998–2003), Commissioner for Tourism (2003–2006), and Permanent Secretary for Economic Development and Labour (Economic Development) (2006–2007).

Political offices
| Preceded by Sarah Liao as Secretary for the Environment, Transport and Works | Secretary for Transport and Housing; 2007–2012 | Succeeded by Anthony Cheung |
| Preceded by Michael Suen as Secretary for Housing, Planning and Lands | Secretary for Transport and Housing; 2007–2012 | Succeeded by Anthony Cheung |
| Preceded by Michael Suen | Chairman of Hong Kong Housing Authority; 2007–2012 | Succeeded by Anthony Cheung |
Order of precedence
| Preceded by Albert Cheng; Recipients of the Gold Bauhinia Star | Hong Kong order of precedence Recipients of the Gold Bauhinia Star | Succeeded by Lawrence Lau; Recipients of the Gold Bauhinia Star |
