= 2021 Hong Kong cabinet reshuffle =

Cabinet reshuffle in Hong Kong

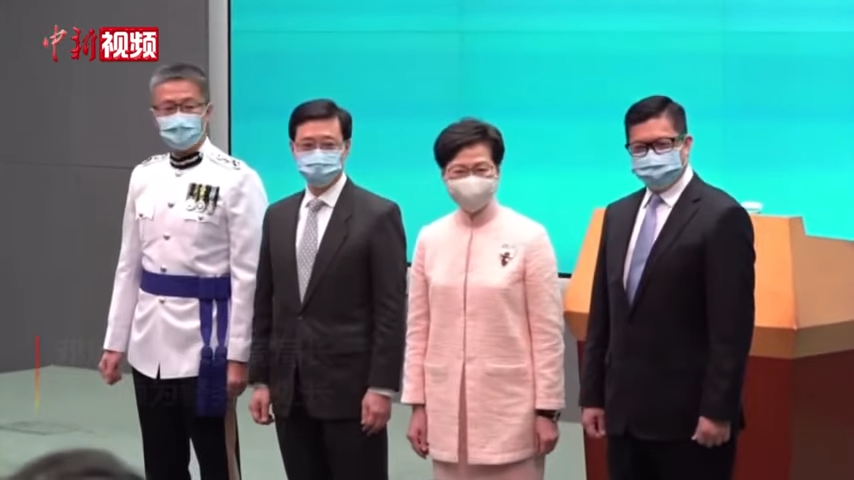
Press conference after the reshuffle

Chief Executive Carrie Lam conducted the second reshuffle of her term from 24 to 25 June 2021. Matthew Cheung was replaced as Chief Secretary by John Lee, the Secretary for Security and a former police officer. The 2021 reshuffle was the first reshuffle to take place after the imposition of the National Security Law.

== Background ==
Following the anti-government protests started in 2019, Chief Executive Carrie Lam reshuffled her cabinet in the first time in 2020 but the popularity of the government remained low. The National Security Law was imposed some months after the reshuffle, which effectively silenced dissidents in the city. The suppression of the pro-democracy camp, mainly led by hawks in the cabinet, grew in 2021, including the arrest and trial of leading activists, along with the forced closure of Apple Daily.

In the morning of 24 June 2021, local online media HK01 claimed that Chief Secretary for Administration Matthew Cheung could soon be replaced. Later that day, multiple local media outlets, citing sources, reported that the cabinet would be reshuffled after a cabinet meeting in the morning. Secretary for Security John Lee was promoted to Chief Secretary, with Commissioner of Police Chris Tang elevated to the Executive Council as Secretary for Security. Chief Secretary Matthew Cheung, aged 70, will therefore retire. The Hong Kong Government announced the reshuffle on 25 June after Chinese State Council approved the new appointments and removal.

== Cabinet-level changes ==
Non-principal officials are italicised.

Colour key
- Promoted
- Left the government

Minister	Party	Before reshuffle	After reshuffle
John Lee Ka-chiu SBS PDSM PMSM JP	Nonpartisan	Secretary for Security	Chief Secretary for Administration
Chris Tang Ping-keung PDSM	Nonpartisan	Commissioner of Police	Secretary for Security
Raymond Siu Chak-yee PDSM PMSM	Nonpartisan	Deputy Commissioner of Police	Commissioner of Police
Matthew Cheung Kin-chung GBM GBS JP	Nonpartisan	Chief Secretary for Administration	Left the government

== Reactions ==
Matthew Cheung, after more than four years as Chief Secretary, said that it had been a "true honour and privilege" to serve Hong Kong for nearly 50 years. He wished that Hong Kong would maintain its long-term stability and prosperity, and all citizens of Hong Kong good health and happiness.

John Lee, a former police officer, was promoted from Security Secretary to Chief Secretary, becoming the first former member of the disciplined services after the handover of Hong Kong in 1997 and the second in the history of Hong Kong to became the second-in-command (William Caine, first head of Police Force was appointed as Colonial Secretary, equivalent to now Chief Secretary, in 1846), as nearly all of his predecessors were former administrative officials. The appointment was relatively surprising as rumours believed Carrie Lam-favoured Patrick Nip, then Civil Service Secretary and former Constitutional Secretary, would be raised to succeed Cheung.

The two new cabinet ministers were the leading figures in cracking down on the protests, and had been sanctioned by the United States in August 2020 for undermining Hong Kong's autonomy. The new cabinet signalled the dominance of the "hawks" and that the government would continue the hardline attitude. Some were concerned the reshuffle could transform Hong Kong into a "police state".

On 27 June 2021, Lee became the acting Chief Executive after Carrie Lam departed Hong Kong to attend celebrations of the 100th Anniversary of the Chinese Communist Party in Beijing, only four days after Lee's promotion. John Lee would later become the chairman of the Candidate Eligibility Review Committee, responsible for vetting election candidates.
