= Margaret Fong =

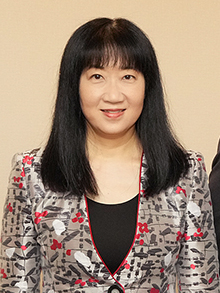
Margaret Fong 2022

Margaret Fong Shun-man (Chinese: 方舜文; born 8 December 1962), is the executive director of the Hong Kong Trade Development Council (HKTDC) and is responsible for the HKTDC's worldwide operations.

== Education ==
Miss Fong graduated from the University of Hong Kong with a BA in English Literature and then attended Oxford University.

== Civil service ==
She joined the civil service in August 1985 and rose to her present rank of Administrative Officer Staff Grade A in April 2008. Miss Fong has served in a number of bureaux and departments, including:

- the former Administrative Service and Information Branch
- the former City and New Territories Administration
- the former Government House
- the former Finance Branch
- the former Constitutional Affairs Branch

Miss Fong has also served in a number of senior positions in recent years, including:

- Deputy Director-General, Hong Kong Economic and Trade Affairs, Washington (August 1997 to September 1999)
- Deputy Secretary for Transport (later retitled Deputy Secretary for Environment, Transport and Works (Transport)) (October 1999 to June 2004)
- Director-General, Hong Kong Economic and Trade Affairs, Washington (August 2004 to July 2006)
- Commissioner for Economic & Trande Affairs, US (July 2006 to October 2008)
- Commissioner for Tourism (November 2008 to Dec 2009)

Political offices
Preceded by Au King-chi	Commissioner for Tourism; 2008–2009	Succeeded by Philip Yung
