= Housing Bureau =

Policy bureau of the Hong Kong Government

- 房屋局

Agency overview
- Formed: 2022
- Jurisdiction: Government of Hong Kong
- Headquarters: 26/F, Immigration Tower, 7 Gloucester Road, Wanchai, Hong Kong
- Agency executives: Winnie Ho, Secretary; Victor Tai, Under Secretary; Charmaine Lee, Permanent Secretary; Au Yeung Man-sin, Political Assistant
- Parent department: Financial Secretary
- Website: Official Website

Housing Bureau
- Traditional Chinese: 房屋局
Transcriptions
Standard Mandarin
- Hanyu Pinyin: Fángwū Jú
Yue: Cantonese
- Yale Romanization: Fòhng Uk Gúk
- Jyutping: Fong4 uk1 guk6

Housing Bureau (HB) is a policy bureau of the Government of Hong Kong. It is responsible for the housing portfolios. The agency was established on 1 July 2022. The current (since 1 July 2022) Secretary for Housing is Winnie Ho.

This bureau was newly established under the re-organization of policy bureaux proposed by Carrie Lam, the fifth Chief Executive of Hong Kong, and was adopted by John Lee, the succeeding Chief Executive after Carrie Lam. On 19 June 2022, the Central People's Government announced the appointment of Winnie Ho, previously the Director of Architectural Services, as the first Secretary for Housing.

== Subordinate departments ==
There is only one department managed by the bureau:

- Housing Department
