= Alan James Scott =

British career Colonial Civil Servant

Alan James Scott (born 14 January 1934) was a career Colonial Civil Servant, whose last posting was as Governor of the Cayman Islands from 10 June 1987 to 14 September 1992.

Prior to that, Scott joined the Hong Kong Government in 1971, and served as the Secretary for Civil Service (1973–77), Secretary for Housing (1977–1980), Secretary for Information (1980–1982), Secretary for Transport (1982–85), and later the Deputy Chief Secretary (1985–87). Before Hong Kong, he had served in Fiji until the country's independence in 1970.

He is married to Joan Hall Scott, born Joan Laureen Hall.
