= Secretary for Culture, Sports and Tourism =

Hong Kong Special Administrative Region Secretary for Culture, Sports and Tourism 文化體育及旅遊局局長
- Emblem of Hong Kong

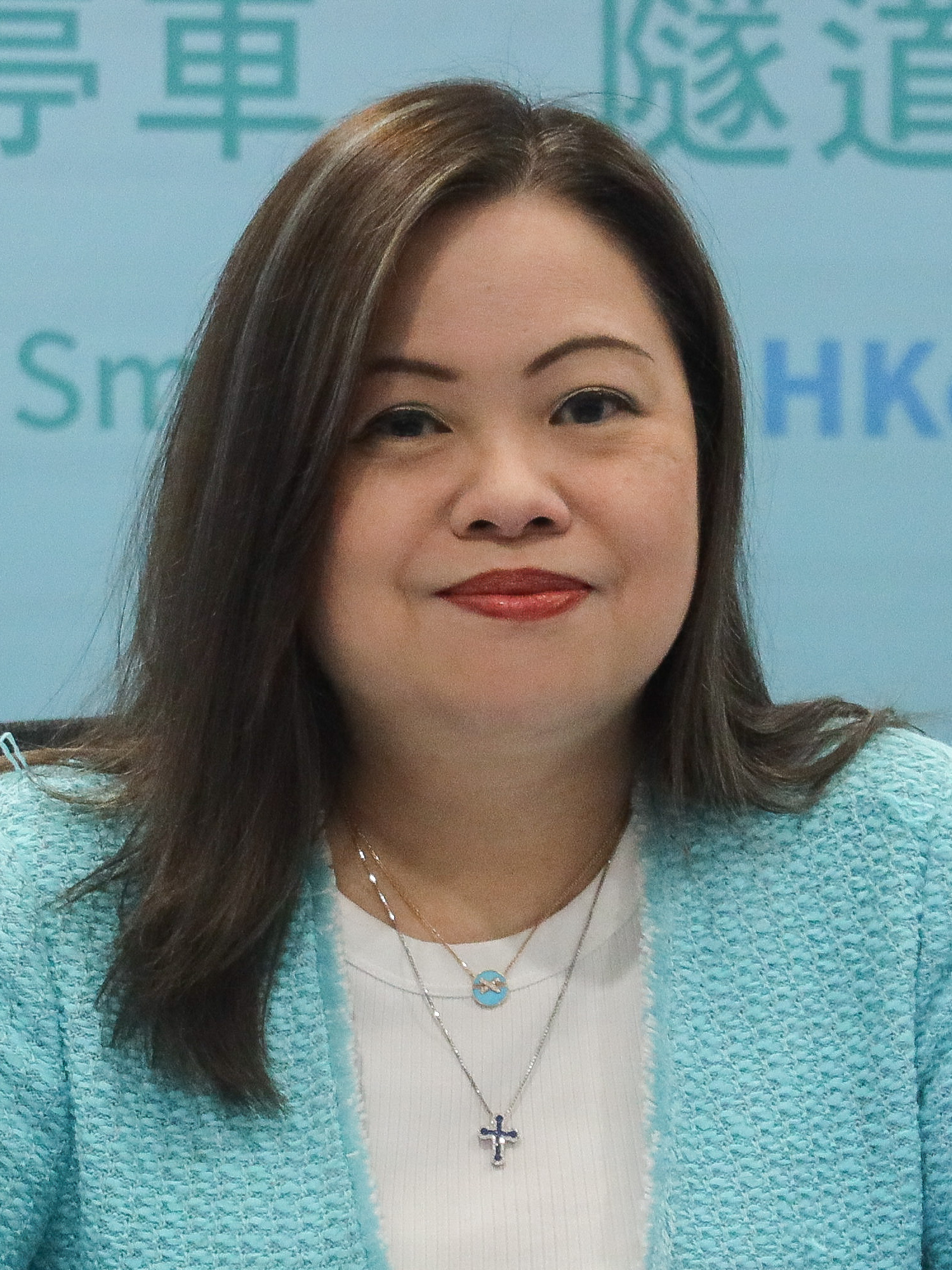
- Incumbent; Rosanna Law Shuk-pui since 5 December 2024
- Culture, Sports and Tourism Bureau
- Style: The Honourable
- Appointer: Central People's Government nomination by Chief Executive
- Inaugural holder: Kevin Yeung
- Formation: 1 July 2022
- Website: CSTB

The Secretary for Culture, Sports and Tourism is the head of the Culture, Sports and Tourism Bureau for the Hong Kong Government, which is responsible for cultural, arts, and sports affairs previously handled by the Home Affairs Bureau, and works related to movie, creative industry, and tourism originally under the Commerce and Economic Development Bureau, in order to promote Hong Kong's culture better.

The position could trace back to Secretary for Municipal Services in 1980s, of which the portfolio included culture and sports. It was replaced by the Secretary for Broadcasting, Culture and Sport (Chinese: 文康廣播司, later 文康廣播局局長), responsible for managing Hong Kong's broadcasting services, developing the film and public entertainment industries, promoting Hong Kong's Arts and Culture, and providing support to sports and physical recreation facilities. The position was abolished in 1998 after re-organization.

== List of office holders ==
Political party: Nonpartisan

=== Secretaries for Municipal Services, 1985–1989 ===
No.	Portrait	Name	Term of office		Governor	Ref
1		Graham Barnes 班禮士	1 April 1985	April 1986	Sir Edward Youde (1982–1986)	
2		Augustine Chui 徐淦	April 1986	31 August 1989	Sir Edward Youde (1982–1986)	
2		Augustine Chui 徐淦	April 1986	31 August 1989	Sir David Wilson (1987–1992)	

=== Secretaries for Broadcasting, Culture and Sport, 1989–1997 ===
No.	Portrait	Name	Term of office		Governor	Ref
1		Augustine Chui 徐淦	1 September 1989	1991	Sir David Wilson (1987–1992)	
2		James So 蘇燿祖	8 June 1991	November 1995	Sir David Wilson (1987–1992)	
2		James So 蘇燿祖	8 June 1991	November 1995	Chris Patten (1993–1997)	
3		Brian Chau 周德熙	20 November 1995	30 June 1997	Chris Patten (1993–1997)	

=== Secretary for Broadcasting, Culture and Sport, 1997–1998 ===
No.	Portrait	Name	Term of office		Duration	Chief Executive	Term	Ref
1		Brian Chau Tak-hay 周德熙	1 July 1997	30 June 1998	364 days	Tung Chee-hwa (1997–2005)	1	

Culture affairs were handled by Secretary for Home Affairs between 1998 and 2022.

=== Secretary for Culture, Sports and Tourism, 2022– ===
No.	Portrait	Name	Term of office		Duration	Chief Executive	Term	Ref
1		Kevin Yeung Yun-hung 楊潤雄	1 July 2022	5 December 2024	2 years, 157 days	John Lee (2022–)	6	
2		Rosanna Law Shuk-pui 羅淑佩	5 December 2024	Incumbent	1 year, 276 days	John Lee (2022–)	6	
