= Mable Chan =

Hong Kong government official (born 1966)

The Honourable Mable Chan JP
- 陳美寶
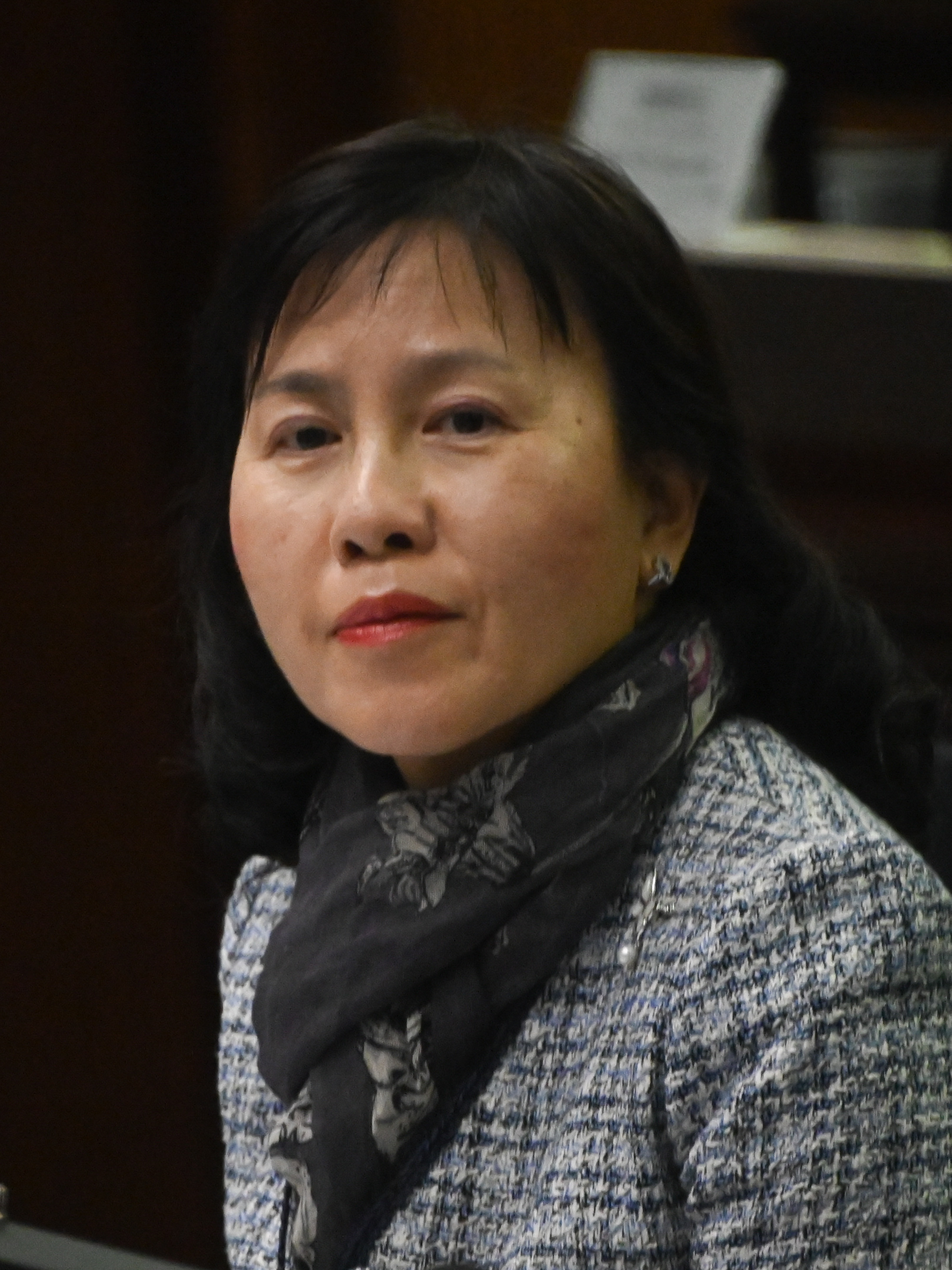
- Chan in 2024

Secretary for Transport and Logistics
- Incumbent
- Assumed office 5 December 2024
- Chief Executive: John Lee Ka-chiu
- Preceded by: Lam Sai-hung

Permanent Secretary for Transport and Logistics (Note: Known as Permanent Secretary for Transport and Housing (Transport) before 1 July 2022)
- In office 1 August 2020 – 5 December 2024
- Preceded by: Frank Chan

Commissioner for Transport
- In office 11 October 2017 – July 2020
- Preceded by: Ingrid Yeung Ho Poi-yan
- Succeeded by: Rosanna Law

Personal details
- Born: 4 January 1966 (age 60)
- Spouse: Leung Chun-wing
- Education: Chinese University of Hong Kong

Mable Chan JP (Chinese: 陳美寶, born 4 January 1966) is a Hong Kong government official, the current Secretary for Transport and Logistics.

Chan studied business administration at Chinese University of Hong Kong, before joining the civil service in July 1989 as an administrative officer. She was appointed Commissioner for Transport in 2017, and promoted to Permanent Secretary for Transport and Housing (Transport) in 2020 and Permanent Secretary for Transport and Logistics in 2022 following a government revamp.

After serving in various transport-related positions for seven years, Chan was appointed Secretary for Transport and Logistics as Chief Executive John Lee reshuffled his cabinet in December 2024. She was succeeding sacked Lam Sai-hung. Lee praised her and Rosanna Law, who was her successor as transport commissioner and also joining the cabinet, for their "leadership, the articulation skills and the proactivity".
