= Commissioner for Tourism =

- Incumbent; Mrs Angelina Cheung since 2024
- Member of: Tourism Commission of Hong Kong
- Reports to: Permanent Secretary for Culture, Sports and Tourism
- First holder: Michael Rowse
- Deputy: Joanne CHU
- Website: https://www.tourism.gov.hk/en/index.php

The Commissioner for Tourism heads the Tourism Commission of the Hong Kong Government, which reports to the Culture, Sports and Tourism Bureau.

Tourism Commission is responsible for policies and strategies formulation, liaison with the trade coordination, as well as leading and co-ordinating the policies implementation and initiatives by Government bureaux and departments to promote the development of the tourism industry of the HKSAR.

== List of Commissioners for Tourism ==
- Michael Rowse (May 1999–October 2000)
- Rebecca Lai (7 December 2000 - 200?)
- Eva Cheng (2003–2007)
- Margaret Fong (2007–2009)
- Philip Yung (2010–2014)
- Cathy Chu (2014-2018)
- Joe Wong Chi-cho (2018-2021)
- Vivian Sum (2021-2024)
- Mrs Angelina Cheung

== See also ==
- Hong Kong Tourism Board
- Airport Authority Hong Kong
- Hong Kong Trade Development Council
