= Frank Chan =

Hong Kong engineer and government official

Frank Chan Fan GBS JP
- 陳帆
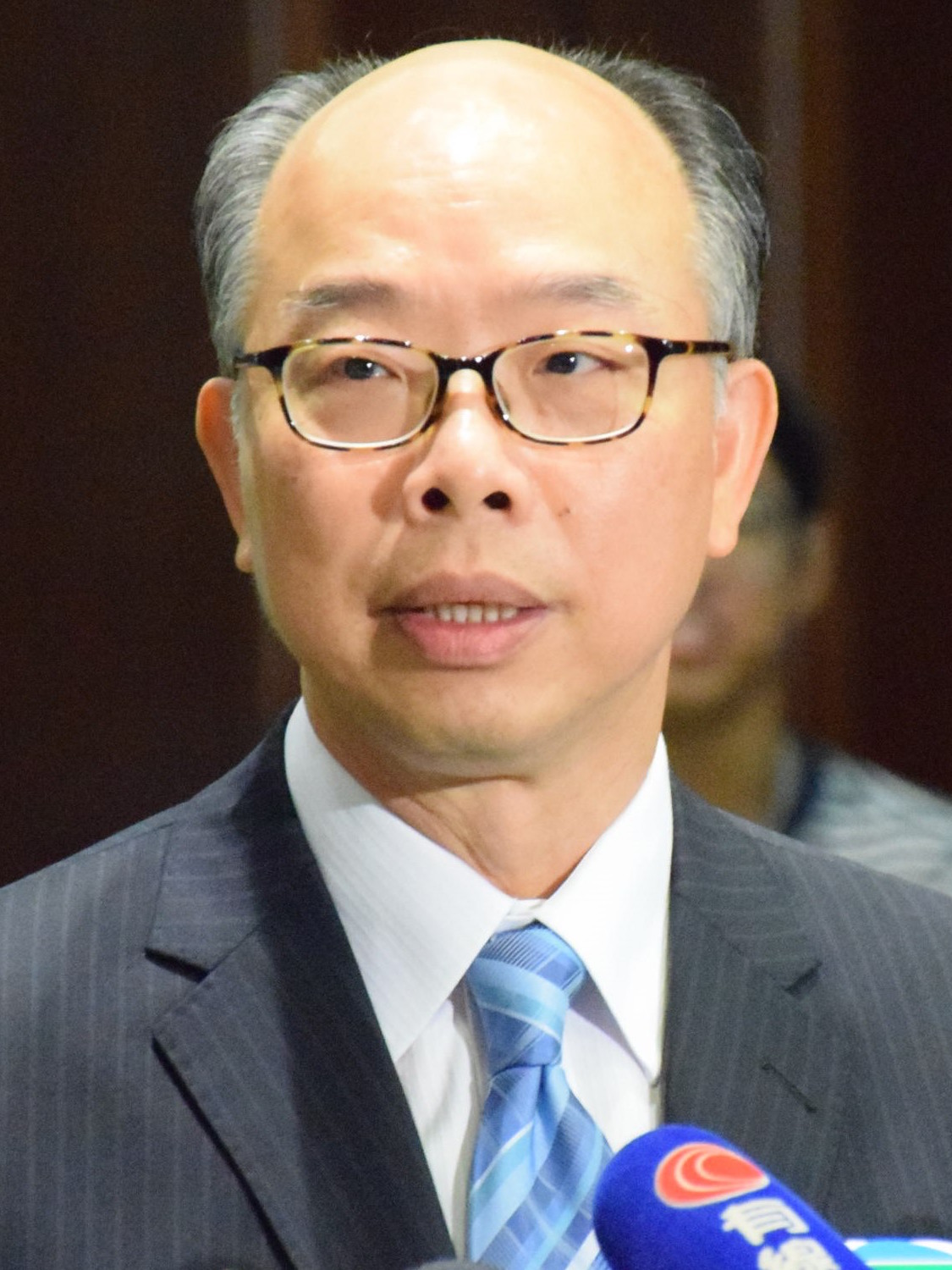

Secretary for Transport and Housing
- In office 1 July 2017 – 30 June 2022
- Chief Executive: Carrie Lam
- Preceded by: Anthony Cheung
- Succeeded by: Winnie Ho (Secretary for Housing); Lam Sai-hung (Secretary for Transport and Logistics)

Personal details
- Born: 4 February 1958 (age 68) British Hong Kong
- Party: None
- Education: University of Hong Kong; University of Aberdeen

Frank Chan Fan GBS JP (Chinese: 陳帆; born 4 February 1958) is a Hong Kong engineer and government official. He served as Secretary for Transport and Housing from 2017 to 2022, also the Chairman of Hong Kong Housing Authority, Chairman of Aviation Development & Three-runway System Advisory Committee and Chairman of Hong Kong Logistics Development Council. Before Chan has become a principal official as Secretary for Transport and Housing, he was the Director of Electrical and Mechanical Services.

== Biography ==
Chan received his bachelor's degree in engineering from the University of Hong Kong, master's degree in medical physics from the University of Aberdeen, UK, and master's degree in business management from the University of Hong Kong.

He joined the Government as an Assistant Electronics Engineer in August 1982. He was promoted to Chief Electronics Engineer in February 2001 and to Government Electrical and Mechanical Engineer in May 2005. He was appointed Deputy Director of Electrical and Mechanical Services in January 2009. He became Director of Electrical and Mechanical Services in 2011. He is the Secretary for Transport and Housing since 2017.

As the Secretary for Transport and Housing, Mr Chan is the Chairman of the Hong Kong Housing Authority, Hong Kong Maritime and Port Board, Hong Kong Logistics Development Council and Aviation Development and Three-runway System Advisory Committee. He is also board member of MTR Corporation Limited, Airport Authority Hong Kong and Hong Kong Mortgage Corporation; as well as member of the Council for Sustainable Development and Economic Development Commission.

In 2018, Chan claimed that the Guangzhou-Shenzhen-Hong Kong Express Rail Link would be profitable since opening day.

In 2021, Chan said that it might take 20 years to substantially reduce the average waiting time of 5.8 years for public housing.

In May 2023, Chan compared district councillors to foreign domestic workers, saying that district councillors could be fired if they did not obey their employers.

Political offices
Preceded by Anthony Cheung	Secretary for Transport and Housing; 2017–2022	Next: Winnie Ho (Secretary for Housing); Lam Sai-hung (Secretary for Transport and Logistics)
Preceded by Anthony Cheung	Chairman of Hong Kong Housing Authority; 2017–2022	Next: Winnie Ho
