= Hong Kong Housing Department =

Government department of Hong Kong

Housing Department
- 房屋署

Agency overview
- Formed: 1973
- Jurisdiction: Government of Hong Kong
- Headquarters: 33 Fat Kwong Street, Ho Man Tin, Kowloon
- Agency executives: Charmaine LEE, Director of Housing; Estrella Cheung, Deputy Director (Strategy); Daniel Leung, Deputy Director (Development & Construction); Ricky Yeung, Deputy Director (Housing Management); Davey Chung, Deputy Director (Corporation Services)
- Parent department: Housing Bureau
- Website: Official Website

Housing Department (房屋署) is a department of Hong Kong Government and is the executive arm of the Hong Kong Housing Authority, managing public housing estates which is a statutory organisation tasked to develop and implement a public housing programme to help the Government achieve its policy objective on public housing. It reports to the Housing Bureau, which is headed by the Secretary for Housing.

== See also ==
- Hong Kong Housing Authority
- Chan Kau-tai
