= Secretary for Transport and Logistics =

Hong Kong Special Administrative Region Secretary for Transport and Logistics 運輸及物流局局長
- Emblem of Hong Kong

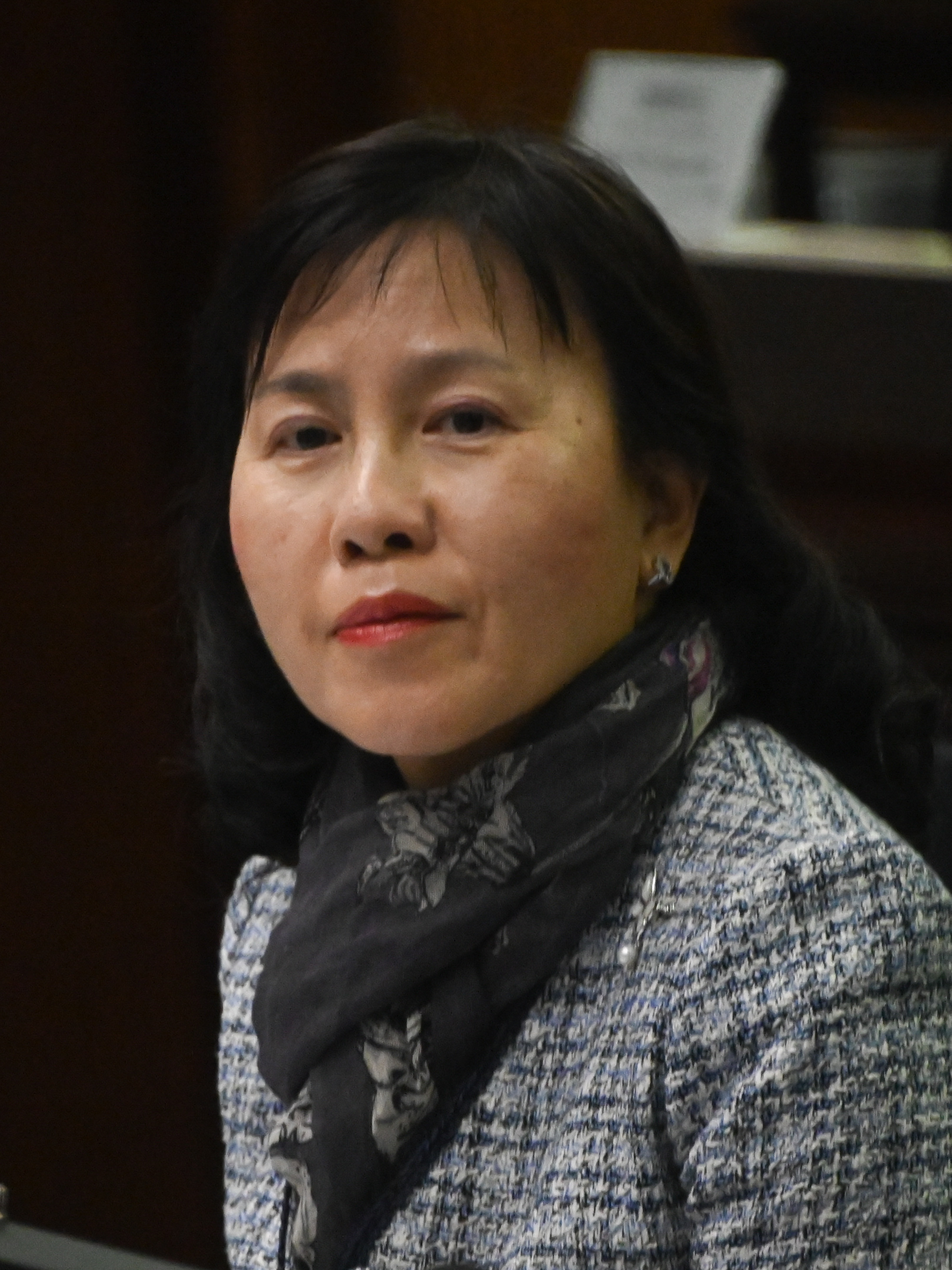
- Incumbent; Mable Chan since 5 December 2024
- Transport and Logistics Bureau
- Style: The Honourable
- Appointer: Central People's Government nomination by Chief Executive
- Inaugural holder: Derek Jones
- Formation: September 1981; 45 years ago
- Salary: HK$4,021,200 per annum
- Website: TLB

Secretary for Transport and Logistics
- Traditional Chinese: 運輸及物流局局長
- Simplified Chinese: 运输及物流局局长
Transcriptions

The Secretary for Transport and Logistics (Chinese: 運輸及物流局局長) in Hong Kong is responsible for transport and logistics related issues. The position was created in 2022 to replace the previous position of Secretary for the Transport and Housing. The position of Secretary for Transport can be traced back to 1981.

== List of office holders ==
Political party: Nonpartisan

=== Secretaries for Transport, 1981–1997 ===
No.	Portrait	Name	Term of office		Governor	Ref
1		Derek Jones 鍾信	September 1981	31 December 1981	Sir Murray MacLehose (1971–1982)	
2		Alan James Scott 施恪	1 January 1982	February 1985	Sir Murray MacLehose (1971–1982)	
2		Alan James Scott 施恪	1 January 1982	February 1985	Sir Edward Youde (1982–1986)	
3		Ian Francis Cluny Macpherson 麥法誠	February 1985	28 June 1986	Sir Edward Youde (1982–1986)	
4		Harnam Singh Grewal 高禮和	29 June 1986	8 February 1987	Sir Edward Youde (1982–1986)	
4		Harnam Singh Grewal 高禮和	29 June 1986	8 February 1987	Sir David Wilson (1987–1992)	
5		Michael Leung Man-kin 梁文建	9 February 1987	May 1993	Sir David Wilson (1987–1992)	
5		Michael Leung Man-kin 梁文建	9 February 1987	May 1993	Chris Patten (1992–1997)	
6		Yeung Kai-yin 楊啟彥	June 1993	September 1993	Chris Patten (1992–1997)	
7		Haider Barma 鮑文	October 1993	June 1996	Chris Patten (1992–1997)	
8		Gordon Siu Kwing-chue 蕭炯柱	June 1996	30 June 1996	Chris Patten (1992–1997)	

=== Secretaries for Transport, 1997–2002 ===
No.	Portrait	Name	Term of office		Duration	Chief Executive	Term	Ref
1		Gordon Siu Kwing-chue 蕭炯柱	1 July 1997	4 August 1997	34 days	Tung Chee-hwa (1997–2005)	1	
2		Nicholas Ng Wing-fui 吳榮奎	4 August 1997	1 April 2002	4 years, 240 days	Tung Chee-hwa (1997–2005)	1	

Transport affairs were handled by Secretary for Environment, Transport and Works between 2002 and 2007.

=== Secretaries for Transport and Housing, 2007–2022 ===
No.	Portrait	Name	Term of office		Duration	Chief Executive	Term	Ref
1		Eva Cheng Yu-wah 鄭汝樺	1 July 2007	30 June 2012	5 years, 0 days	Donald Tsang (2005–2012)	3	
2		Anthony Cheung Bing-leung 張炳良	1 July 2012	30 June 2017	5 years, 0 days	Leung Chun-ying (2012–2017)	4	
3		Frank Chan Fan 陳帆	1 July 2017	30 June 2022	4 years, 364 days	Carrie Lam (2017–2022)	5	

=== Secretaries for Transport and Logistics, 2022–present ===
No.	Portrait	Name	Term of office		Duration	Chief Executive	Term	Ref
1		Lam Sai-hung 林世雄	1 July 2022	5 December 2024	2 years, 157 days	John Lee (2022–present)	6	
2		Mable Chan 陳美寶	5 December 2024	Incumbent	1 year, 276 days	John Lee (2022–present)	6	
