= Lam Ching-choi =

Hong Kong paediatrician and politician

Dr the Honourable Lam Ching-choi BBS, JP
- 林正財
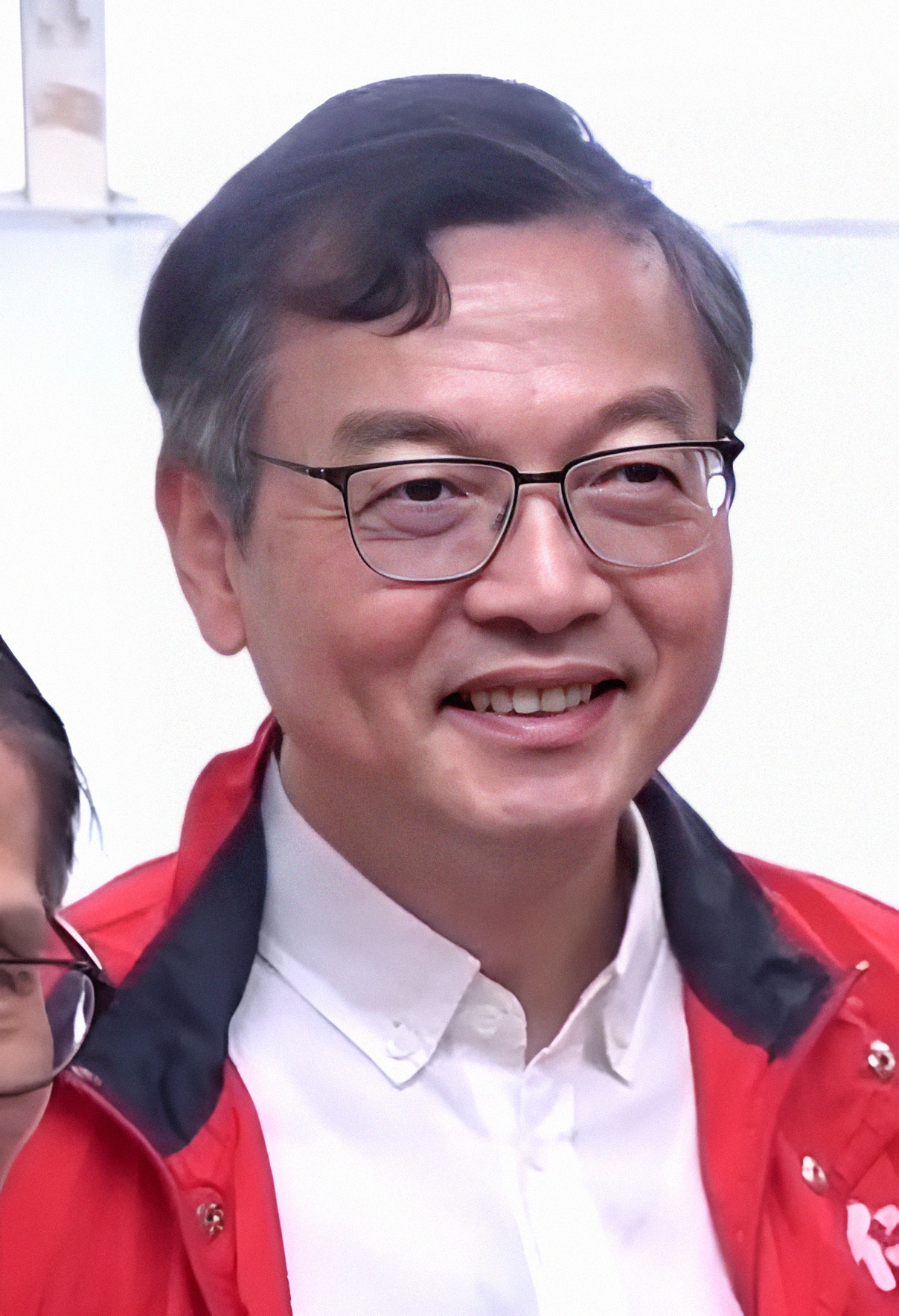
- Participating in Kick Off Ceremony of Yan Chai Fortune Bag 2019 in Shek Wai Kok Estate

Non-Official Member of the Executive Council
- Incumbent
- Assumed office 1 July 2017
- Chief Executive: Carrie Lam

Member of the Sai Kung District Council
- In office 1 July 1997 – 31 December 2007
- Constituency: Appointed

Personal details
- Born: 1960 (age 65–66) British Hong Kong
- Education: University of Hong Kong

Dr. Lam Ching-choi, BBS, JP (Chinese: 林正財; born 1960) is a Hong Kong paediatrician. He is the chief executive officer of the Haven of Hope Christian Service and chairman of the Elderly Commission. From 2017, he is also non-official member of the Executive Council of Hong Kong, appointed by Chief Executive Carrie Lam.

Lam was born into a peasant family in Kam Tin, New Territories in 1960. He was educated at the Bishop Hall Jubilee School and then the Medical School of the University of Hong Kong and became a paediatrician. He joined the Haven of Hope Christian Service and became its chief executive officer dedicating in elderly welfare. He is also governor of the Matilda and War Memorial Hospital.

He was appointed in many public positions, including the Land and Development Advisory Committee, Hong Kong Council for Accreditation and Academic and Vocational Qualifications and Health and Medical Development Advisory Committee. He became the chairman of the Community Investment and Inclusion Fund Committee in 2013 and chairman of the Elderly Commission in 2016. He was made Justices of the Peace in 2003 and received Bronze Bauhinia Star in 2008.

He was appointed to the Executive Council of Hong Kong in 2017.

Order of precedence
Previous: Edward Yau; Member of the Executive Council	Hong Kong order of precedence Member of the Executive Council	Next: Michael Wong; Member of the Executive Council
