= Lam Sai-hung =

Secretary for Transport and Logistics of Hong Kong

The Honourable Ir Lam Sai-hung GBS JP
- 林世雄
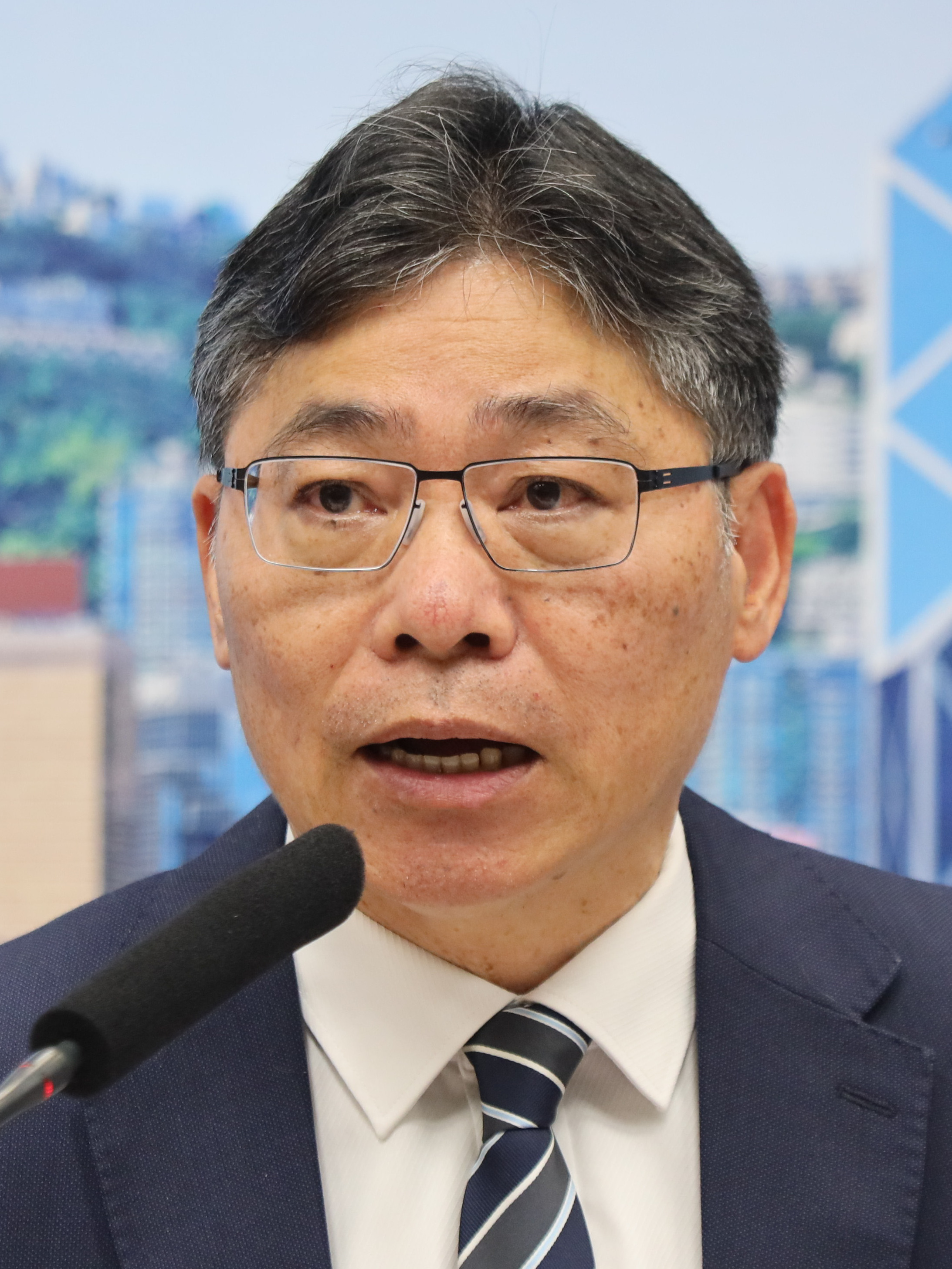
- Lam in 2023

Secretary for Transport and Logistics
- In office 1 July 2022 – 5 December 2024
- Chief Executive: John Lee
- Preceded by: Frank Chan (as Secretary for Transport and Housing)
- Succeeded by: Mable Chan

Permanent Secretary of Development (Works)
- In office 13 October 2018 – 7 October 2021
- Preceded by: Hon Chi-keuung
- Succeeded by: Ricky Lau

Director of Civil Engineering and Development
- In office 27 September 2016 – 13 October 2018
- Preceded by: Daniel Chung
- Succeeded by: Ricky Lau

Personal details
- Born: 8 October 1961 (age 64) Hong Kong

Lam Sai-hung GBS JP (Chinese: 林世雄, born 8 October 1961) is a Hong Kong engineer and governmental official who served as the Secretary for Transport and Logistics from 2022 to 2024.

After graduation from Wong Shiu Chi Secondary School, Lam studied civil engineering in the University of Hong Kong and obtained a Bachelor of Science in 1983. He joined the government in 1986 as assistant engineer. After promotion to principal government engineer in 2014, he was appointed director of Civil Engineering and Development in 2016. Two years later he became permanent Secretary of Development (Works), and retired in October 2021. Nine months after his retirement, he was appointed by the new chief executive John Lee as Secretary for Transport and Logistics in 2022. In December 2024, Lam, along with culture minister Kevin Yeung, was sacked by Chief Executive John Lee, who did not answer directly to reporters on why the two were replaced.

Lam is a fellow member of the Hong Kong Institution of Engineers, the Institution of Civil Engineers, and the China Hong Kong Railway Institution, and is an adjunct professor at the Department of Civil Engineering of the University of Hong Kong.

Political offices
| Preceded by Frank Chan (as Secretary for Transport and Housing) | Secretary for Transport and Logistics; 1 July 2022 – 5 December 2024 | Incumbent |
Government offices
| Preceded by Hon Chi-keuung | Permanent Secretary of Development (Works); 13 October 2018 – 7 October 2021 | Succeeded by Ricky Lau |
| Preceded by Daniel Chung | Director of Civil Engineering and Development; 27 September 2016 – 13 October 2018 | Succeeded by Ricky Lau |
