= Winnie Ho =

Hong Kong architect

The Honourable Winnie Ho JP
- 何永賢
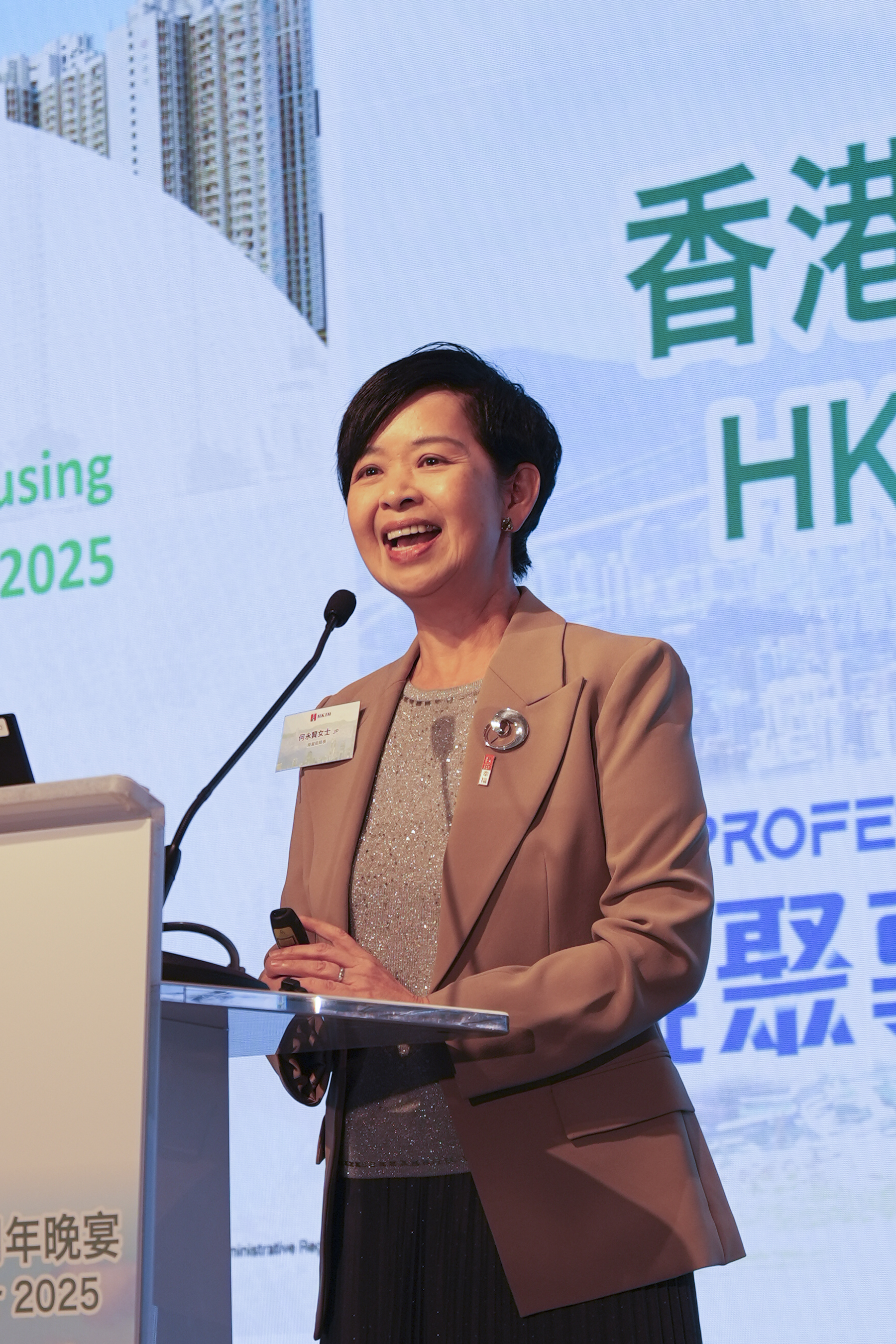
- Winnie Ho

Secretary for Housing
- In office 1 July 2022 – 29 October 2026
- Preceded by: Frank Chan (as Secretary for Transport and Housing)
- Succeeded by: Michael Wong Wai-lun (Acting)

Director of Architectural Services
- In office 18 December 2020 – 30 June 2022

Personal details
- Born: 8 September 1964 (age 62)
- Spouse: Lo Kin-yip Terence
- Education: St. Paul's Co-Educational College
- Alma mater: University of Hong Kong

Winnie Ho Wing-yin is a former Secretary for Housing of the Hong Kong Special Administrative Region government, appointed on 1 July 2022 as part of John Lee's administration. She resigned on October 29, 2026 after a report was released on the Wang Fuk Court fire.

== Biography ==
According to her government profile, Ho was a graduate of the Faculty of Architecture from the University of Hong Kong. Ho joined the government in 1992 as an Architect, was promoted to Chief Architect in 2009, Government Architect in 2012, and Deputy Director of Architectural Services in 2018, and Director of Architectural Services in 2020. In July 2022, she was appointed Secretary for Housing.

Separately, she works in the Energizing Kowloon East Office of the Development Bureau as Deputy Head.

In August 2022, news outlets reported that Ho and her husband bought a flat for HK$12.5 million in 2006 with an illegal structure, and the government's Buildings Department ordered the structure removed in 2008. The structure was not removed until 2021.

In November 2022, Ho said that even though John Lee announced the target to be 4.5 years, the government's goal for public housing wait times is three years.

In December 2022, Ho revealed that "light public housing" with 16–18 floors would cost HK$680,000 per unit, more than public permanent housing, which cost HK$650,000 per unit. Some lawmakers criticized the cost, saying that the government was not transparent in its cost breakdown. Other people complained that the four sites chosen for light public housing were in remote areas.

In January 2023, Ho said that light public housing units would not include air conditioning, in order to reduce costs by about HK$200 million.

On 29 October 2026 she resigned from office as Secretary for Housing to take political responsibility following a report over the Wang Fuk Court fire releasing to the public.

== Personal life ==
Ho declared that she and her husband own a property in Singapore. In total, Ho owns three properties in Hong Kong and one in Singapore.

In August 2022, a family member tested positive for COVID-19, and Ho underwent quarantine. In October 2022, Ho's driver tested positive for COVID-19.
