= List of tenants in One World Trade Center =

One World Trade Center
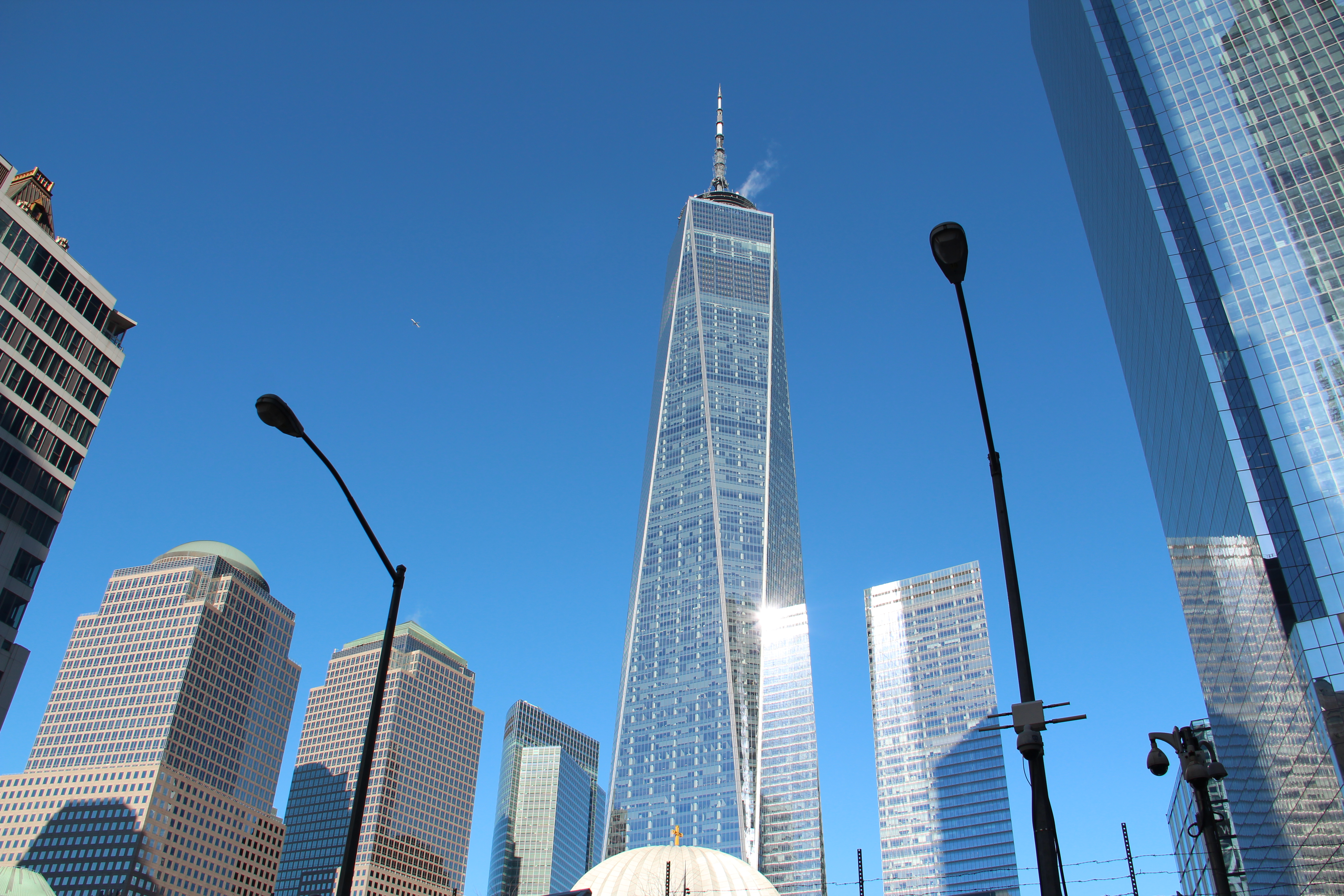
- One World Trade Center on January 2, 2024. This is the current list of tenants who are so far occupying the rebuilt One World Trade Center. The tower officially opened on November 3, 2014.
- Alternative names: 1 WTC

General information
- Status: Completed
- Location: West Street, New York, New York, United States
- Construction started: April 27, 2006
- Topped-out: May 10, 2013
- Completed: May 10, 2013
- Opening: November 3, 2014
- Owner: Port Authority of New York and New Jersey
- Operator: The Durst Organization

Height
- Antenna spire: 1,776 ft (541 m)
- Roof: 1,368 ft (417 m)

Technical details
- Floor count: 104
- Floor area: 3,501,274 sq ft (325,279.0 m^{2})
- Lifts/elevators: 73

Design and construction
- Architect: David Childs
- Structural engineer: WSP Global

References
- May 29, 2015; 11 years ago (One World Observatory)

This page lists the tenants of One World Trade Center.

== List ==
Fl#	Companies
105	Roof access (SPIRE)
104	Mechanical floor
103	Mechanical floor
102	One World Observatory — See Forever Theater and the ASPIRE event space.
101	One Dine restaurant, One Mix bar, and guest photo experience for visitors to One World Observatory.
100	One World Observatory, Gift Shop, Main Observatory
99	Floor numbers skipped
98	Floor numbers skipped
97	Floor numbers skipped
96	Floor numbers skipped
95	Floor numbers skipped
94	Floor numbers skipped
93	Mechanical floor
92	Mechanical floor
91	Mechanical floor
90	Channel 2 (WCBS), Channel 4 (WNBC), Channel 5 (WNYW), Channel 9 (WWOR), Channel 13 (WNET), Channel 31 (WPXN), Channel 42 (WKOB-LD), Channel 47 (WNJU),WSKQ-FM, WMBC-TV
89	China Center New York, China-US SkyClub
88	Cloudflare
87	Circle
86	MCR Development LLC, TWA lounge, Jordan Park
85	Servcorp, D100 Radio, HF Productions, Cartridge World, Leaf Equities, ThinkCode, Samra Wealth Management, Regal Investments, Private EQ, Drone USA, FastFin, Cowbird Capital LP, Pandev Law LLC, Manhattan Networks Corporation, QUANTIS, PandaGuarantee
84	SHVO, Juno Lab, Ponto Software, Medical Knowledge Group
83	Global Risk Advisors, ITI Data, Khan Funds Management America INC, Group RMC Corp
82	Scale Facilitation, Olo Inc.
81	Carta
80	ASAPP, Surgical Safety Technologies Inc., Better
79	Infosys Technologies
78	Ameriprise Financial
77	Guarantr, Undertone, Studio 71, Augustus Intelligence, Mercor
76	Corry Capital Advisers LLC, Fractal Analytics, Ichnos Sciences, LMAX Group
75	Wunderkind
74	Wunderkind
73	—N/a
72	DAZN Group
71	DAZN Group, Princeton Longevity Center, DADA Holdings
70	Celonis
69	Stagwell Global
68	Stagwell Global
67	Stagwell Global
66	Stagwell Global
65	Stagwell Global
64	Skylobby, One World Commons, Stagwell Global, Well& by Durst
63	Stagwell Global
62	Stagwell Global
61	Slalom, Norm Ai
60	Norm Ai
59	Energy Capital Partners
58	Energy Capital Partners, High 5 Games
57	Masterworks
56	Moody's Investors Service, IBISWorld
55	General Services Administration
54	General Services Administration
53	General Services Administration, Federal Emergency Management Agency
52	General Services Administration, Federal Emergency Management Agency
51	General Services Administration, U.S. Customs and Border Protection
50	General Services Administration, U.S. Customs and Border Protection
49	Aaptiv, Pison Stream Solutions Judi Health, Venerable
48	Sailthru, Energy Capital Partners, Levin, Templafy, TheGuarantors
47	Olam Americas Inc., Decryptex Financial Laboratories Leap USA, MS Shift INC., Energy Aspects Corporation, SiriusPoint RQD* Clearing LLC
46	Targetspot, BMB Group, Zyyo, C12 Capital Management, Westfield Corporation, Tinypass, Casablanca Capital LLC, Kensho Technologies, ITI Data, Energy Aspects, Piano, Inc., IRIS Software, Softomotive US, Epoch Capital US, Pilot Fiber NY LLC, Campisano Capital, LLC,World Trade Centers Association
45	Legends Hospitality, LiveIntent, Cushman & Wakefield, Symphony Communication Services LLC, KiDs Creative, Town Square Trading, Augustus Intelligence, HyperScience, Eshopworld, OnyxPoint Global Management LP
44	Condé Nast, Sabin, Bermant & Gould LLP
43	Condé Nast
42	Condé Nast
41	Ambac Financial Group
40	Ennead Architects
39	New York Life
38	Condé Nast
37	Condé Nast
36	Condé Nast, Bon Appétit Offices; Institute of International Education global headquarters
35	Condé Nast, Bon Appétit Test Kitchen
34	Condé Nast
33	Reddit
32	W Magazine
31	Kroll
30	Condé Nast
29	Condé Nast
28	Condé Nast
27	Condé Nast
26	Condé Nast
25	Condé Nast
24	Condé Nast
23	Condé Nast
22	Axsome Therapeutics
21	Constellation Agency
20	Condé Nast
19	Mechanical floor
18	Mechanical floor
17	Mechanical floor
16	Mechanical floor
15	Mechanical floor
14	Mechanical floor
13	Mechanical floor
12	Mechanical floor
11	Mechanical floor
10	Mechanical floor
9	Mechanical floor
8	Mechanical floor
7	Mechanical floor
6	Mechanical floor
5	Mechanical floor
4	Mechanical floor
3	Mechanical floor
2	Mechanical floor
L	Main Lobby, One World Observatory ticket booth/machines
C1	Westfield World Trade Center, One World Observatory ticket machines and entrance/exit, Main Lobby, Duane Reade
C2	Westfield World Trade Center, Access to Oculus, Chase Bank
C3	Loading Dock/Building Services
C4	Building Services/Tenant Storage
