= Timeline of the 2019–2020 Hong Kong protests (March–June 2019) =

Early events of the 2019–2020 pro-democracy demonstrations in Hong Kong

Timeline of the 2019–2020 Hong Kong protests
2019			March–June				July	August	September	October	November	December
2020	January	February	March	April	May	June	July	August	September	October	November	December
2021	January	February	March	April	May	June	July	August	September–November			December

The period from March to June 2019 in the 2019–2020 Hong Kong protests is considered the early stage of the movement. Until the first mass demonstrations in June, protests were focused on the withdrawal of the extradition bill. In June, protesters started to lay out five demands. The additional four demands concerned the reactions of the Hong Kong government and especially, the police to the protests, and called more broadly for full democracy in the city.

The first protest against the bill took place on 15 March. Two subsequent protests on 31 March and 28 April witnessed a sharp increase in the number of attendants, which the organisers claimed as 130,000 for the 28 April protest. As the Hong Kong government around Chief Executive Carrie Lam pushed for a speedy second reading of the bill, the protests dramatically increased in size, with estimates of protester numbers being over one million for the protests on 9 June, and up to two million – more than a quarter of the city's population – for those on 16 June. By that time, protests had started to change their focus to include the alleged excessive use of violence by police against protesters, which had marred the late-night end of the 9 June protest, and which was drawing further international attention during the 12 June siege of the Legislative Council Building by the protesters. On that day, the protesters achieved a partial success when the second reading of the bill was halted indefinitely. The full reversal of the police characterisation of the 12 June violence as "riots" would become one of the five demands.

Protesters also tried to draw international attention to their cause by protesting on occasion of the G20 summit in Osaka at the end of the month. The city would see further increases in protest activity and the violence levels at the annual 1 July march when the Legislative Council building was stormed by protesters, and in the following several months.

== Prelude ==
=== Before 31 March ===
Before the first large-scale demonstration (in terms of numbers) took place on 31 March, Demosistō held a sit-in protest event at the Central Government Complex on 15 March.

=== 31 March demonstration ===
The Civil Human Rights Front (CHRF), a platform for 50 pro-democracy groups, launched its first protest march against the bill on 31 March, from Southorn Playground in Wan Chai to the Central Government Complex in Admiralty. Claudia Mo, pro-democracy camp's convener, and Lam Wing-kee, the owner of Causeway Bay Books who had been kidnapped by Chinese agents in 2015, led the rally. High-profile democracy activists, like Cardinal Joseph Zen, barristers Martin Lee and Margaret Ng, and Apple Daily owner Jimmy Lai, also attended the rally. Organisers claimed 12,000 people took part in the march, while police put the peak figure at 5,200.

=== 28 April march ===
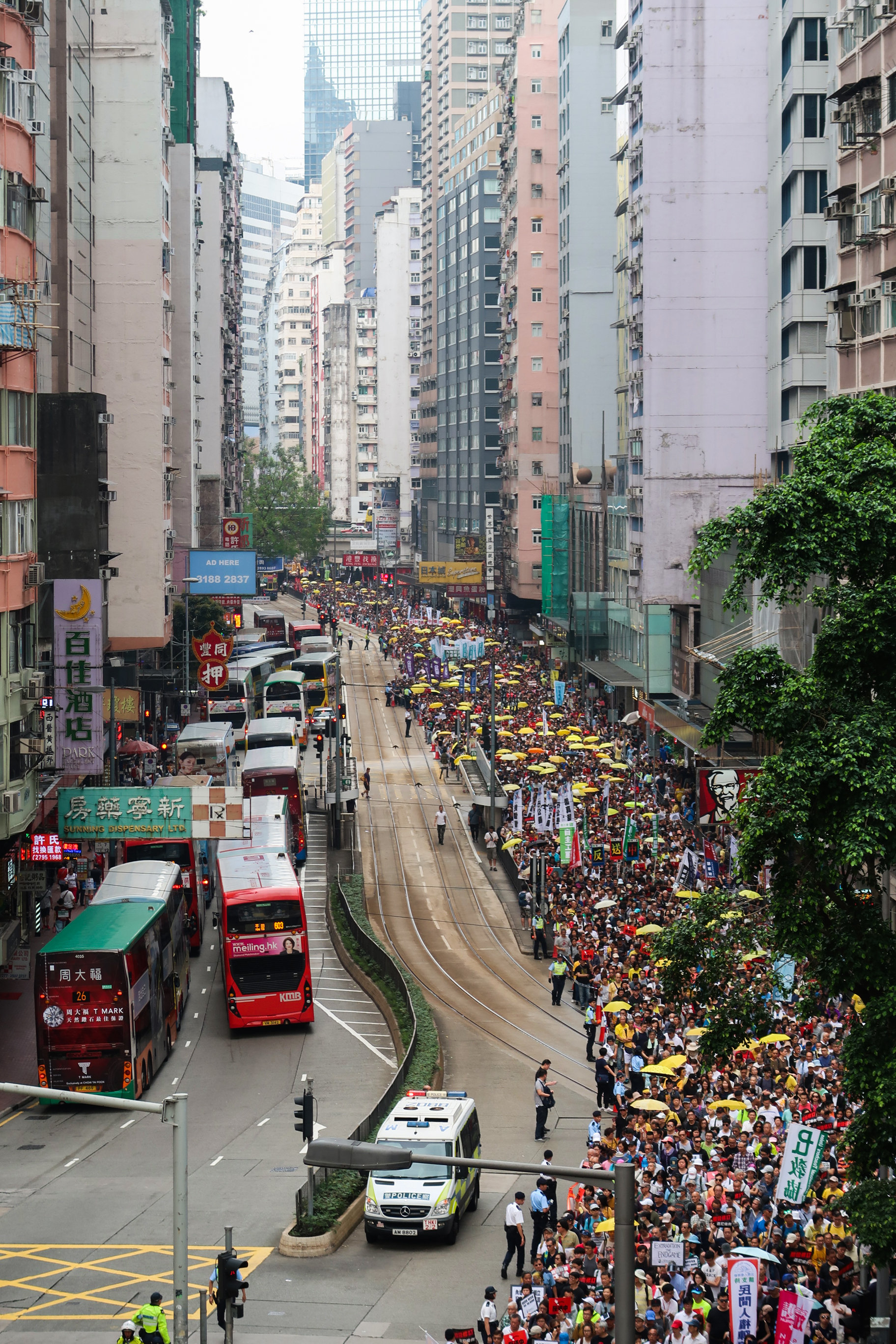
Thousands of protesters marched in Wan Chai against the proposed China extradition law on 28 April 2019.

The second protest march against the extradition bill began at East Point Road, Causeway Bay and headed to the Legislative Council in Admiralty. The march lasted over four hours. While police estimated 22,800 protesters, organisers claimed 130,000 participants. The latter figure was the highest since the estimated 510,000 that organisers claimed joined the annual 1 July protest in 2014.

The next day, Chief Executive Carrie Lam remained adamant that the bill would be enacted and said the Legislative councillors had to pass the new extradition laws before their summer break. Lam said Chan Tong-kai, the suspect in the Murder of Poon Hiu-wing, could be out of prison by October, hence the urgency of passing the extradition bill. Although Chan received a prison sentence on 29 April, Secretary for Security John Lee expected that Chan could be free to leave Hong Kong early for good behaviour.

=== May ===
On 4 May, a rally was held in a demonstration area outside the Legislative Council. About 300 people attended the rally in support of the democrats. While the democrats received vocal support in the chants, members of the pro-establishment camp were booed.

On the evening of 10 May, rallies in the Legislative Council in opposition to the Fugitive Offenders Ordinance amendment and in solidarity with an overnight stay in the conference room of the Legislative Council pro-democracy members, about 1,000 people attended. On 11 May, a fight broke out in Hong Kong's legislature on Saturday as pro-democracy lawmakers and those loyal to China discussed the extradition law that would extend Beijing's powers over the financial hub.

On the evening of 13 May, the FDC and demonstrators stayed outside the Legislative Council overnight. There were 30 members of the public in solidarity with the democrats. There was a quarrel with security.

=== 4–5 June Hilltop vertical protest banners ===
Hong Kong is one of a few places that still commemorate those who died in the 1989 Tiananmen Square massacre. On the 30th anniversary of the 1989 Tiananmen Square protests and massacre, someone put a yellow "Dare Not Forget June Fourth" (「毋忘六四」) vertical protest banner over Beacon Hill.

The day after the "Never Forget June Fourth" banner, yet another 15-meter vertical protest banner was erected over Devil's Peak. This banner stated in Chinese "Lam Sold Hong Kong; Resign!" (「林鄭賣港下台！」) in black font over yellow fabric.

=== 6 June lawyers' silent march/Before protest ===
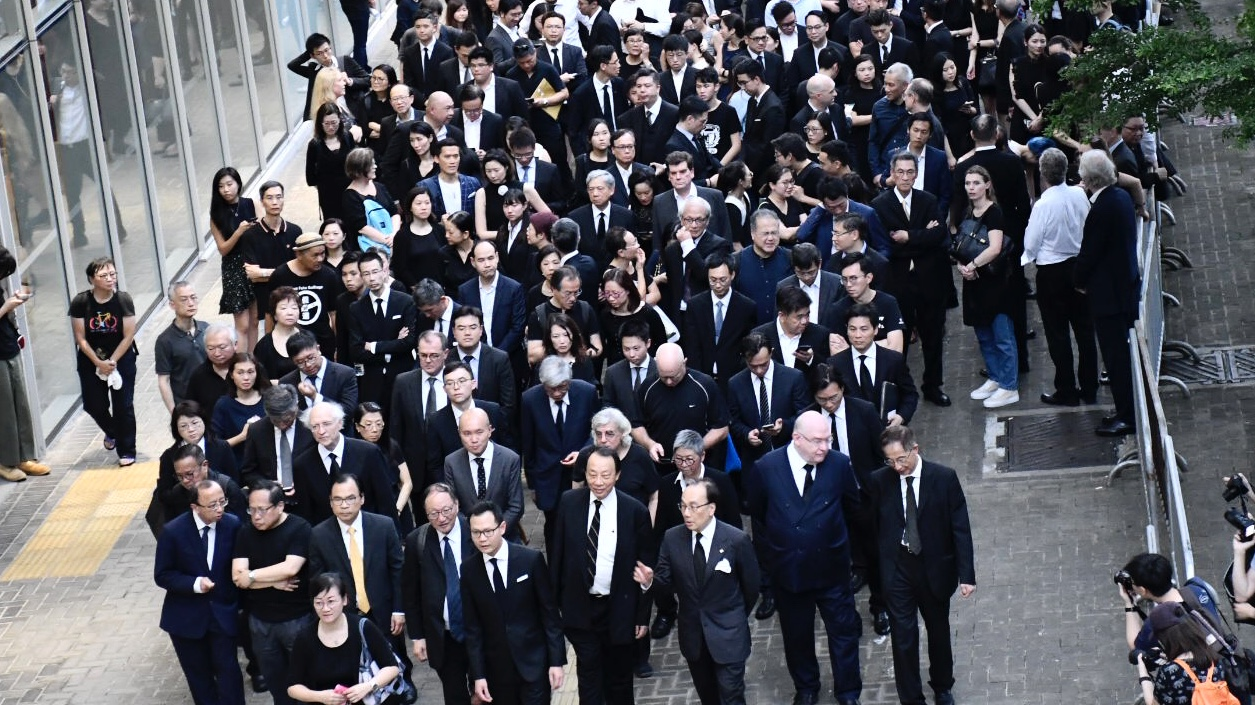
Thousands of lawyers marched in black against the extradition bill on 6 June 2019.

Legal professionals concerned about the extradition bill also staged a silent march on 6 June. In black attire, lawyers, legal academics and law students marched from the Court of Final Appeal to the Central Government Offices. Dennis Kwok, Legislative Councillor for the Legal constituency, and Martin Lee and Denis Chang, two former Hong Kong Bar Association chairmen, led the march. The group of lawyers stood silently in front of government headquarters for three minutes. Kwok said, "We shall not bow our heads [to the government]". More than 3,000 lawyers, representing around one-quarter of the city's legal professionals, attended the march – the fifth and largest protest march held by lawyers in Hong Kong since 1997.

While the protesting lawyers expressed reservations about openness and fairness of the justice system in China, Secretary Lee had previously said the legal sector did not really understand the bill and some had not read the bill before protesting.

A 50-meter yellow vertical banner was seen on Lion Rock displaying in black font "No Extradition To PR China" and its Chinese equivalent, 「反送中」.

== Tensions heightened ==
=== 9 June protest ===
==== Daytime rally ====
Protest on 9 June

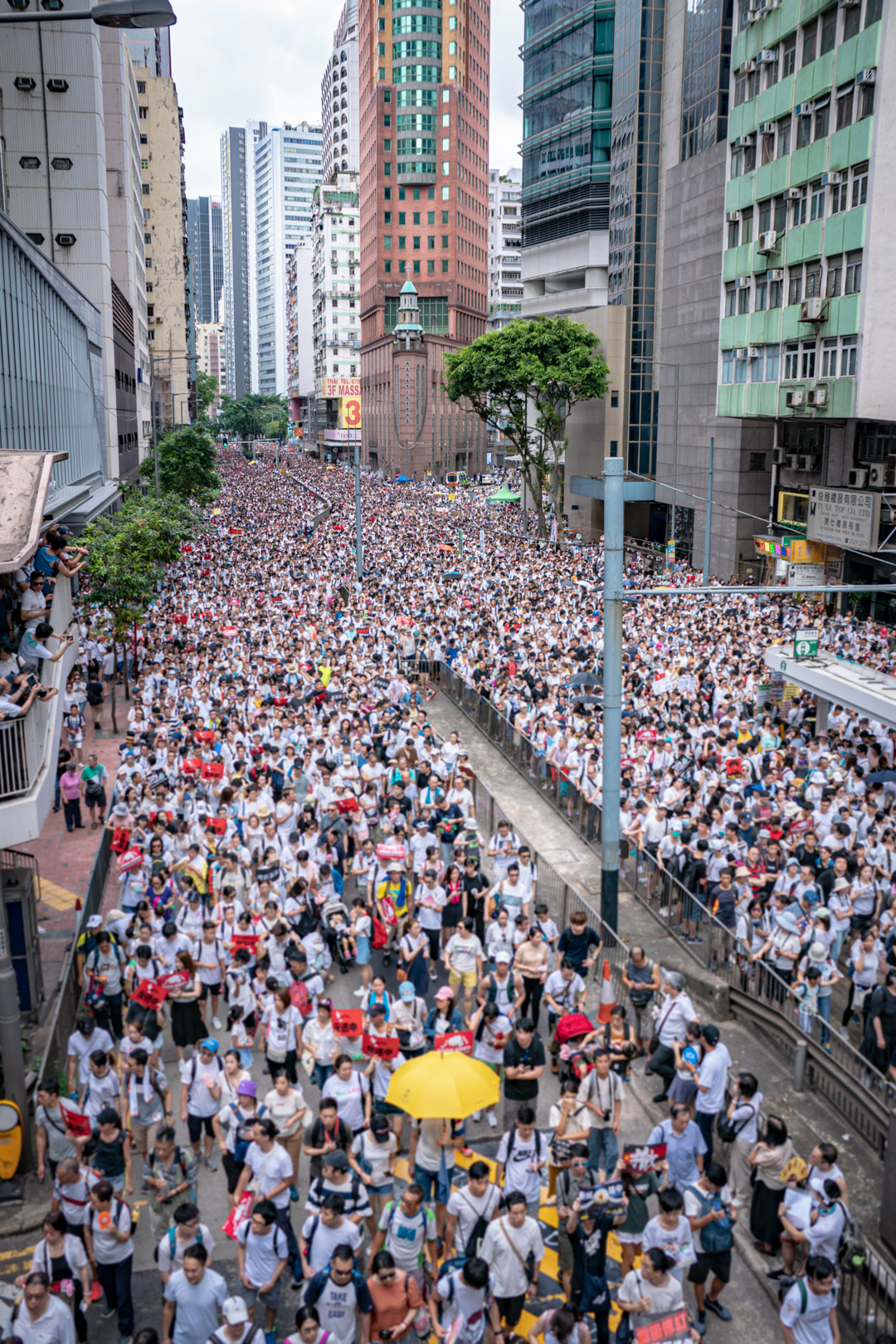
Mass protest on 9 June: organisers estimated 1 million participants; police said 270,000 at its peak.

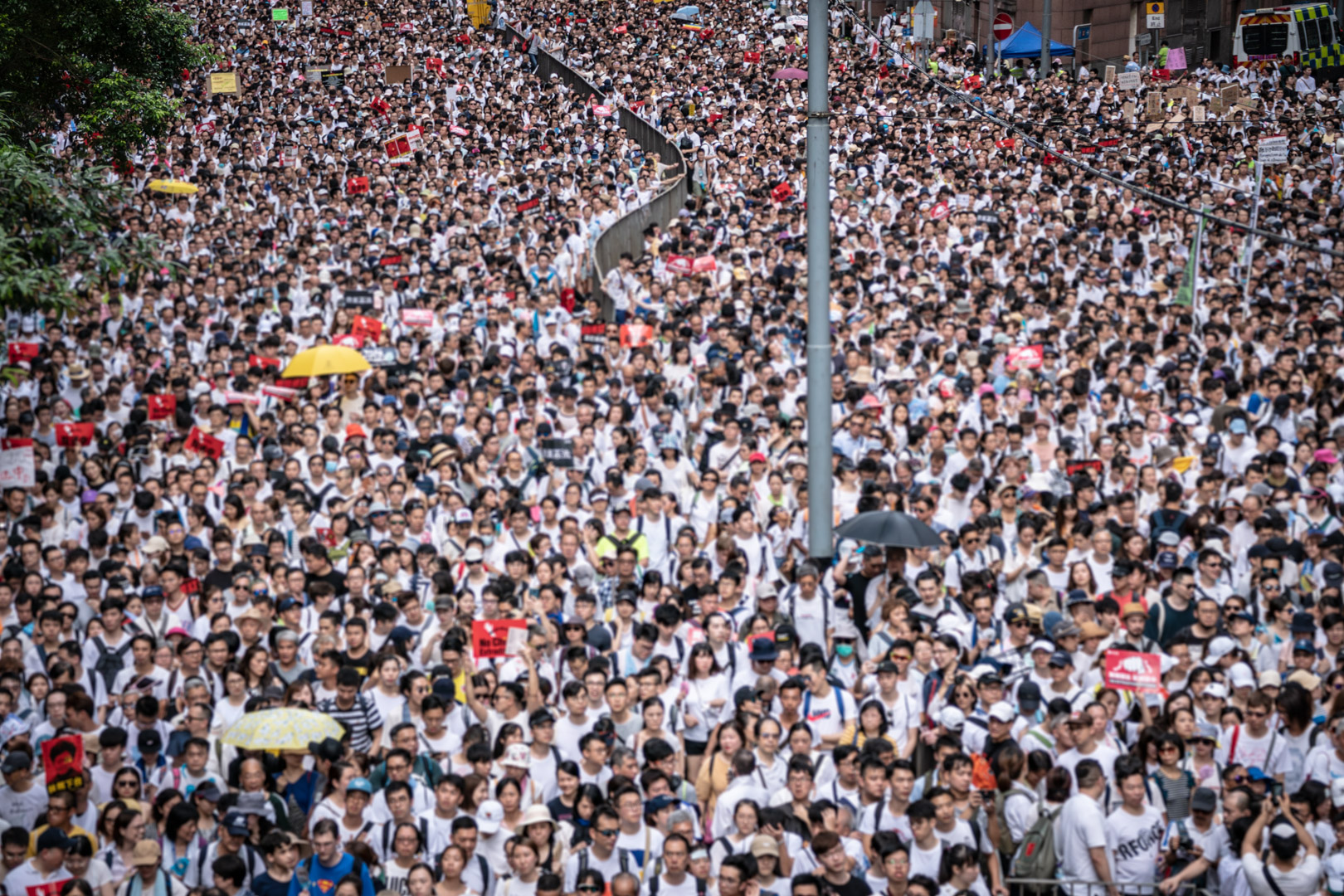
Protesters marching on 9 June 2019

Before the government tabled the extradition bill's second reading in the Legislative Council on 12 June, the CHRF had called Hong Kong people to march against the bill on 9 June through an approximately 3 km (1.86 mi) route from Victoria Park to the Legislative Council in Admiralty.

Police ordered MTR to bypass Wan Chai, Causeway Bay and Tin Hau stations for several hours. Protesters exited at Fortress Hill to join the protest. Police urged protesters to start off before the official 3 pm start-time to ease overcrowding; police were forced to open up all lanes on Hennessy Road, having previously refused to do so. A significant number of protesters were still leaving Victoria Park up to four hours after the start time, and were still arriving at the end-point at 10 pm.

Reports suggested it could have been the largest ever, and certainly the largest protest Hong Kong has seen since the 1997 handover, surpassing the turnout seen at mass rallies in support of the Tiananmen protests of 1989 and 1 July demonstration of 2003. CHRF convenor Jimmy Sham said that 1.03 million people attended the march, while the police put the crowd at 240,000 at its peak.

==== Night-time clashes ====
Hundreds of protesters camped in front of the government headquarters well into the night, with more joining them in response to calls from Demosistō and pro-independence activists. Police formed a human chain to prevent protesters from entering Harcourt Road, the main road next to government headquarters, while Special Tactical Squad (STS) was on standby. Although the CHRF had officially called an end to the march at 10 pm, around 100 protesters remained at Civic Square.

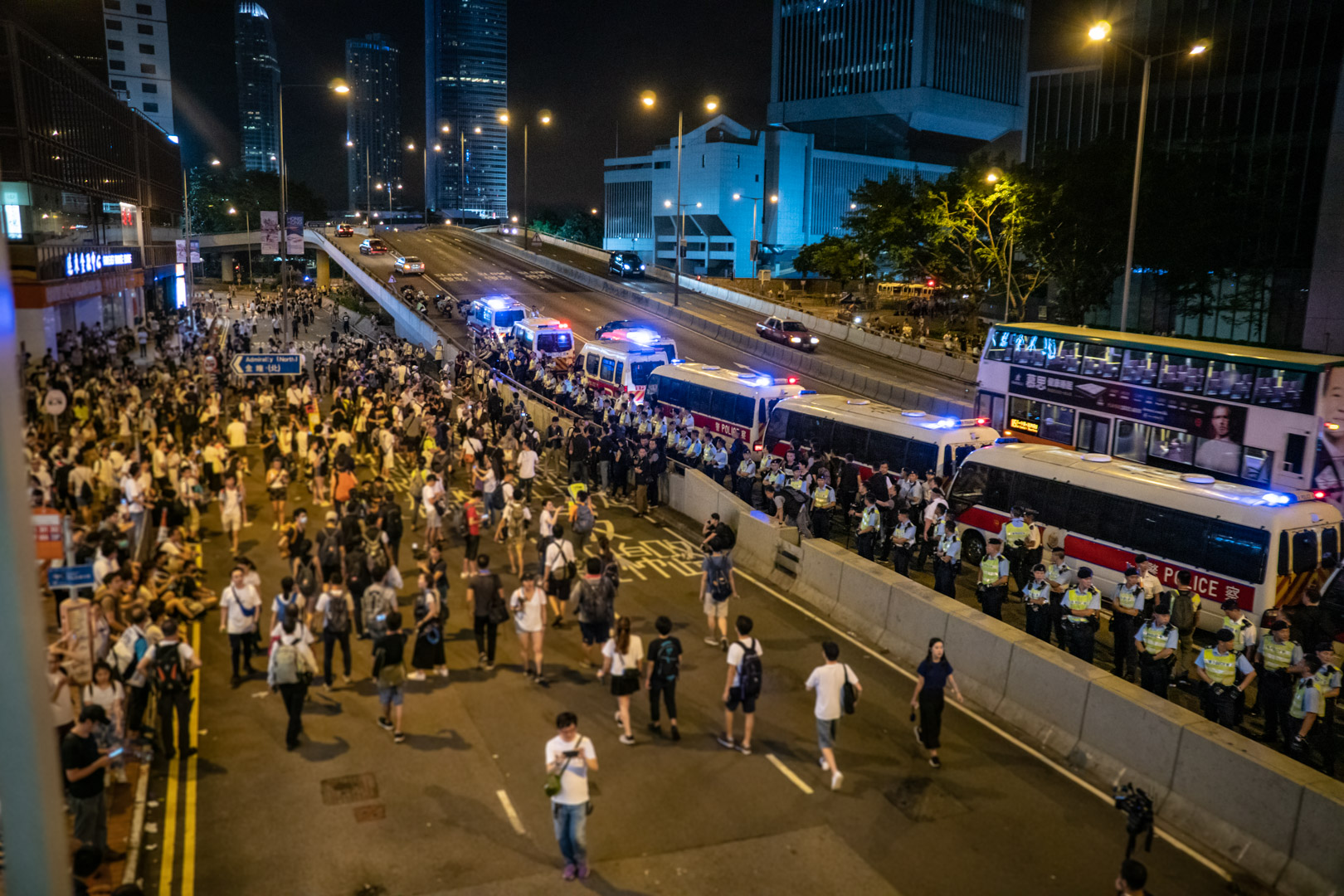
Protesters on Harcourt Road at night, with police on standby. 9 June 2019

At 11 pm, the government issued a press statement, saying it "acknowledge[s] and respect[s] that people have different views on a wide range of issues", but insisted the second reading debate on the bill would resume on 12 June. In response, several members of Demosistō staged a sit-in outside the Legislative Council Complex demanding a dialogue with Lam and Lee, while pro-independence groups Student Localism and the Students Independent Union, called for escalating protest actions if the government failed to withdraw the bill.

Around midnight, when a permission of protesters expired, police moved in to clear protesters who had planned to stay outside the Central Government Complex until 12 June. Tensions escalated and clashes broke out between protesters and officers at the Legislative Council Complex. Protesters threw bottles and metal barricades at police and pushed barricades while officers responded with pepper spray. Riot police pushed back against the crowd and secured the area, while police on Harcourt Road also pushed protesters back onto the pavements. Clashes shifted to Lung Wo Road as many protesters gathered and barricaded themselves from the officers. Several hundred protesters were herded by officers towards Lung King Street in Wan Chai around 2 am and then into Gloucester Road. Police hemmed in the last pockets of protesters in the early morning outside the old Wan Chai police station. By the end of the clearance, 19 protesters had been arrested while 358, who had been corralled along the wall of the Old Wan Chai Police Station by a large number of officers, had their profiles recorded; 80 per cent of them were younger than 25.

The next morning, Lam refused to withdraw the bill but acknowledged that the sizeable rally showed there were "clearly still concerns" over the bill. Pressed about whether she would resign, she asserted it was important to have a stable governing team "when our economy is going to undergo some very severe challenges because of external uncertainties."

=== 12 June – strike and siege of LegCo ===
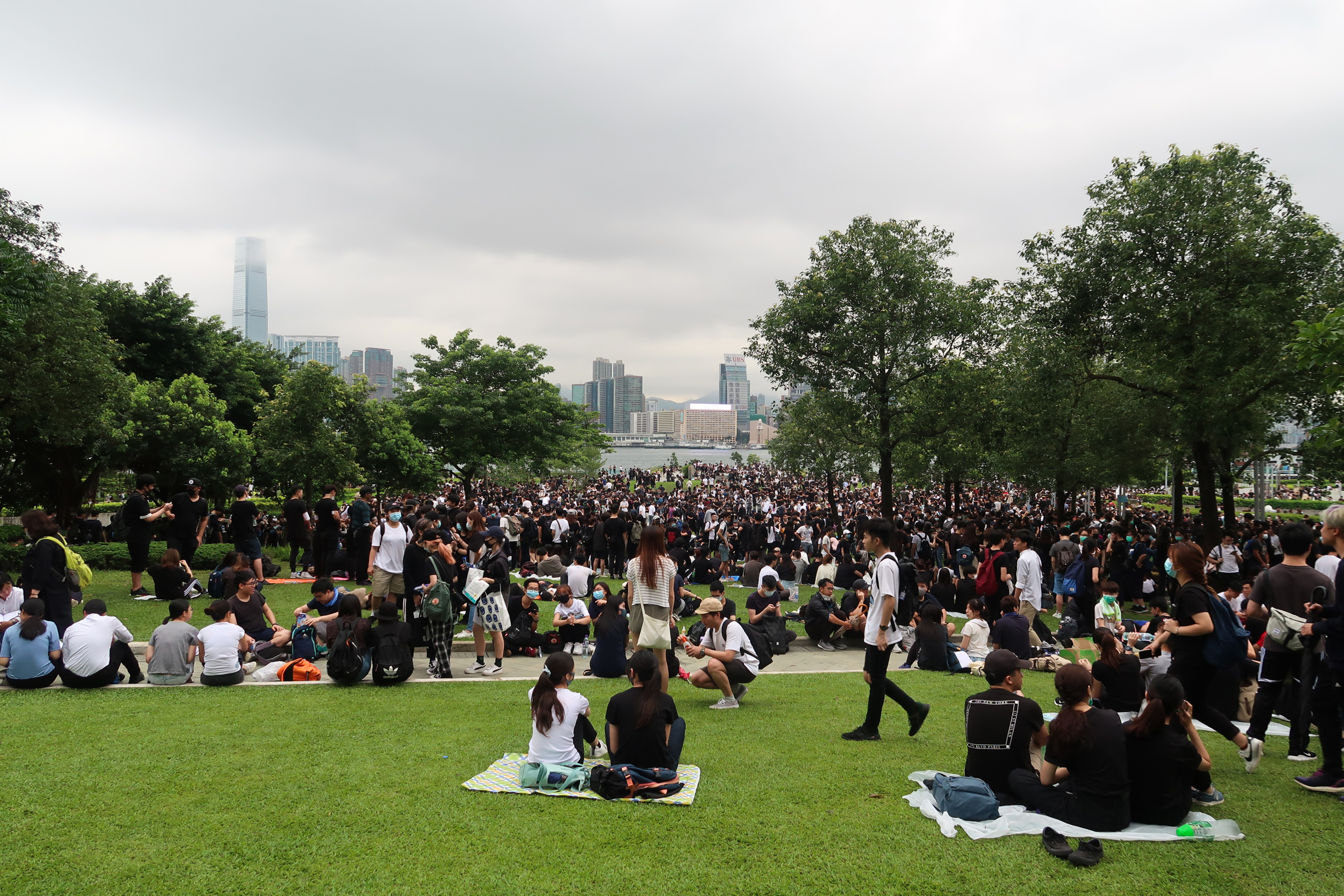
Online groups called on people to "picnic" on the morning of 12 June at Tamar Park.

A general strike had been called for 12 June, the day of the planned resumption of the second reading of the extradition bill. The Hong Kong Confederation of Trade Unions (HKCTU) appealed to workers to join the protest; hundreds of businesses closed for the day and numerous workers went on strike. Protesters attempted to stall the second reading of the extradition bill.

Around 8 am, the crowd rushed onto Harcourt Road, blocking traffic. Lung Wo Road and surrounding streets were also blocked by the protesters in a scene reminiscent of 2014 Occupy protests. Around 11 am, the Legislative Council Secretariat announced that the second reading debate on the extradition bill had been postponed indefinitely.

Around 3:20 pm, protesters on Tim Wa Avenue began to charge the police barricades and were doused with pepper spray in reply. Protesters also attempted to charge the Legislative Council building. Riot police dispersed the protesters by firing tear gas, beanbag rounds and rubber bullets. There was a stand-off on Harcourt Road between protesters and the police. As of 6 pm, 22 injured people had been sent to public hospitals. At around 6:20 pm, the Legislative Council Secretariat issued a circular saying Legislative Council President Andrew Leung had called off the meeting. Protesters remained in the streets outside the AIA Tower in Central, Queensway outside Pacific Place shopping mall, and at the junction of Arsenal Street and Hennessy Road in Wan Chai into the night. By the end of the day, at least 79 protesters and police officers had been treated in hospitals; around 150 tear gas canisters, "several" rounds of rubber bullets, and 20 beanbag shots had been fired during the protest clearance.

According to the CHRF, the police had earlier agreed to peaceful demonstration within the area outside CITIC Tower in its letter of no objection. However, teargas was fired by police, to some criticism. As people trickled through the jammed central revolving door and a small side door, the police fired another two tear gas canisters into the trapped crowd fuelling panic. Amnesty International also criticised the use of tear gas against the trapped crowd.

Commissioner of Police Stephen Lo declared the clashes a "riot" and condemned the protesters' behaviour. Speaking in Cantonese, Lo used the term for "disturbance", but a police spokesman later clarified he meant "riot". Chief Executive Carrie Lam backed Lo, saying the protesters' "dangerous and life-threatening acts" had devolved into a "blatant, organised riot". The police have been criticised for its excessive use of force, including the misuse of rubber bullets, police batons, tear gas and riot control agents. The Special Tactical Squad deployed also lacked visible identification. Amnesty concluded that the use of force by police against the largely peaceful protest was unnecessary and excessive and that police had "violated international human rights law and standards." It was also criticised for assaulting, insulting and ignoring the safety of journalists, and conducting arrests inside hospitals and accessing patients' medical documents without consent.

=== 14 June mothers' sit-in ===
Following an interview of Carrie Lam on TVB in the morning of 12 June in which she lamented that as a mother, she would not have tolerated her children's violent protests, a group of women barristers and scholars from Chinese University launched an online petition stating that "the people of Hong Kong are not your children" and admonished her for attacking their children with tear gas, rubber bullets or bag bombs." Some 6,000 people participated in a three-hour sit-in at Chater Garden in Central on the evening of 14 June. The protesters dressed in black and holding carnations, called on Carrie Lam to step down and for the government to retract the bill. They also held up placards condemning police brutality, such as "don't shoot our kids." The organisers also said they had collected more than 44,000 signatures in a petition condemning the views Lam expressed in the interview.

=== 15 June Hilltop vertical protest banner ===
A new phrase on a 30-meter vertical banner was seen on Lion Rock at around 6 am. The fabric was yellow, but this time a few of the words were printed red. The banner demanded "Safeguard Hong Kong" (「保衞香港」) in Chinese, with the word "safeguard" in red, followed by an English phrase "Fight for HK" with the word "fight" in red.

=== 16 June march ===
Protest on 16 June

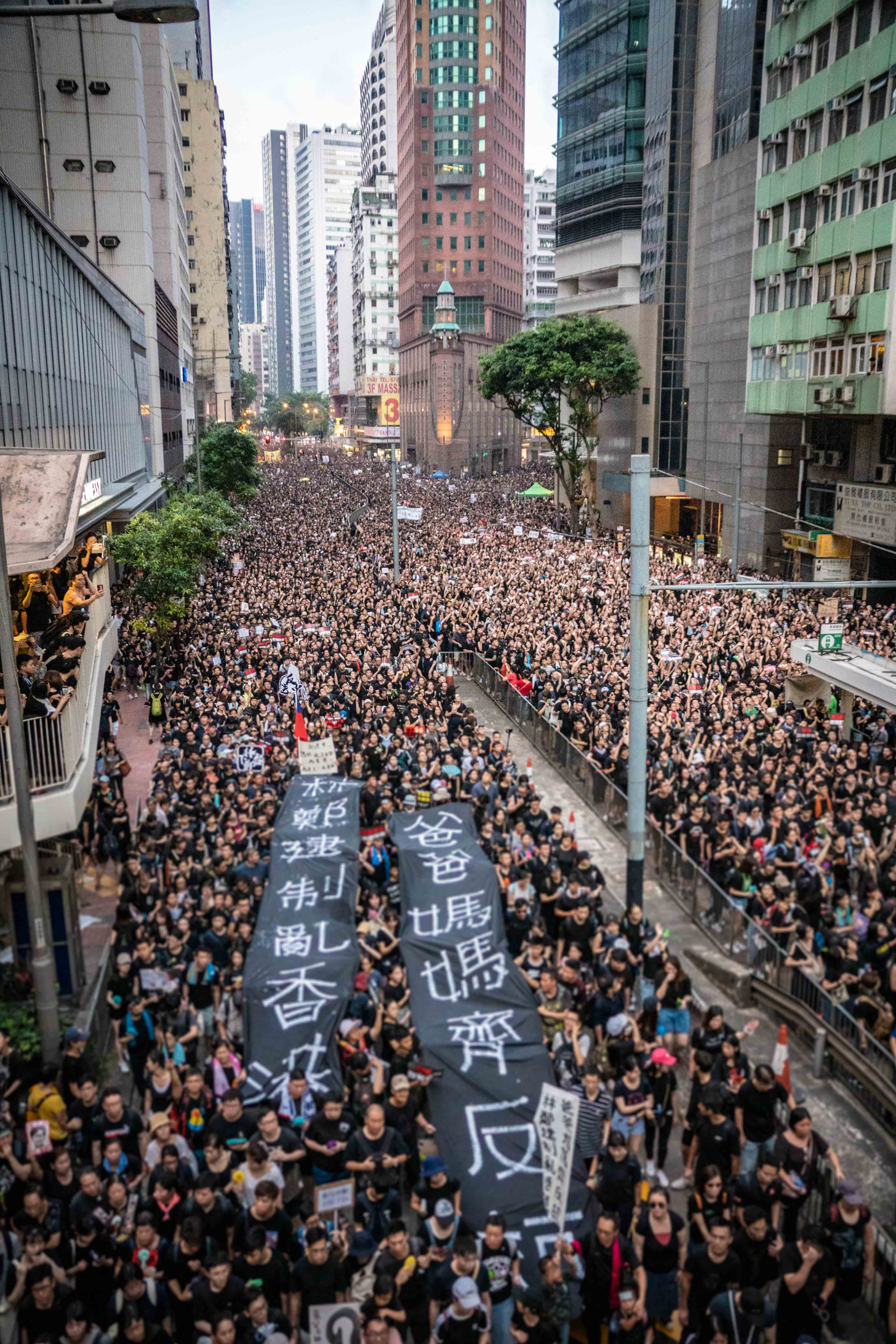
Mass protest in black on 16 June

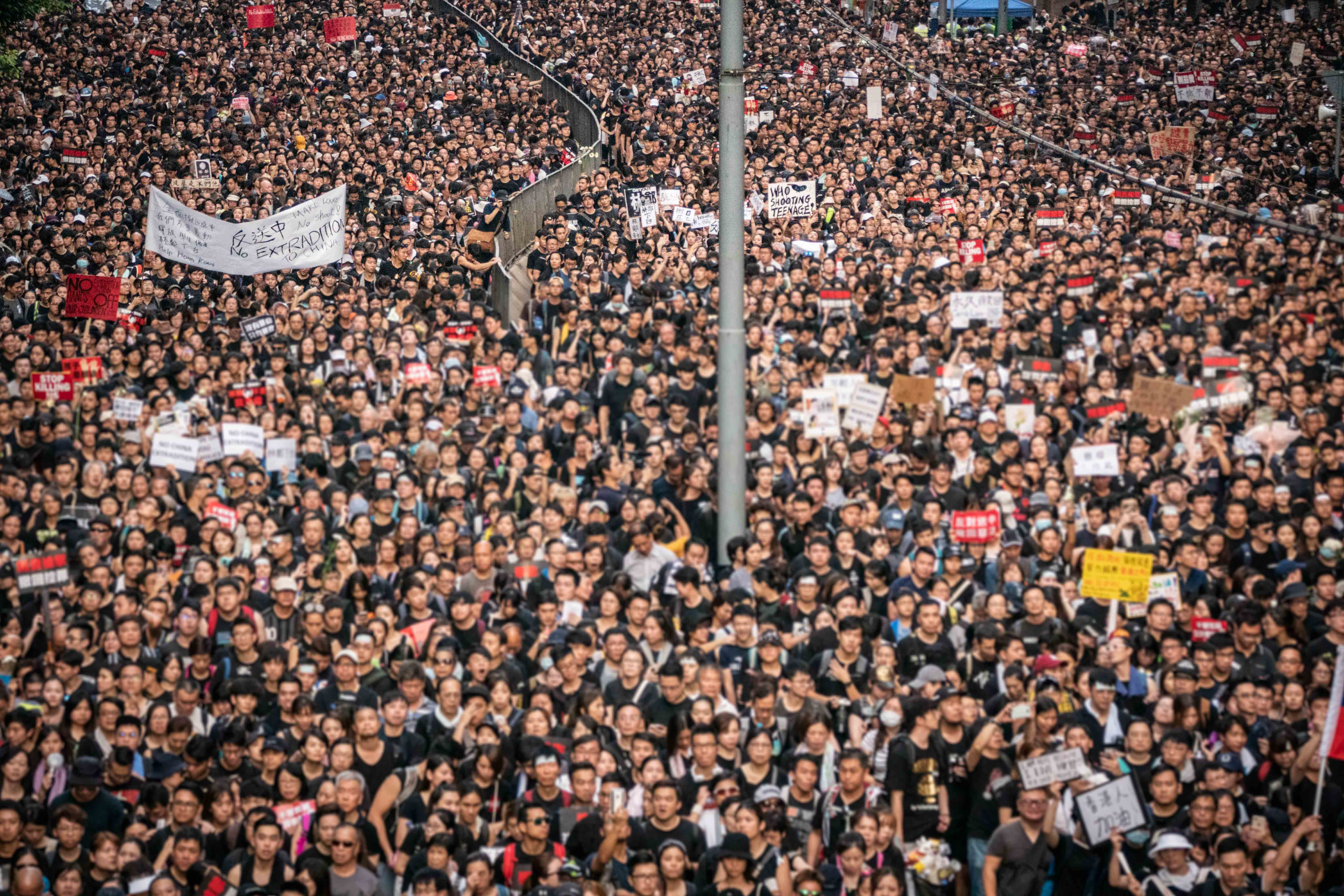
Protesters marching in black on 16 June 2019

On 15 June, Chief Executive Carrie Lam announced a pause in the passage of the extradition bill after the Legislative Council meetings had been postponed for four working days in a row. The pro-democracy camp feared it was merely a tactical retreat and demanded a full withdrawal of the bill and said they would go ahead with the 16 June rally as planned. Jimmy Sham, convenor of the CHRF, said the suspension could be a trap. They also called for Lam's resignation, apology for "disproportionally violent" police tactics towards peaceful protesters, the release of arrested protesters, and to withdraw the official characterisation of the protest on 12 June as "riot".

The march started ahead of time, at 2:30 pm on 16 June, from Victoria Park, Causeway Bay, to the Legislative Council in Admiralty – an approximately 3-kilometre-long (1.9 mi) route. Slogan-chanting protesters were predominantly dressed in black, some wearing white ribbons on their chests in anger at police brutality during the 12 June crackdown. Many protesters started their march from North Point as the police ordered the MTR not to stop at Tin Hau and Causeway Bay during the march. Nearby train stations were swamped with hundreds of thousands pouring into the protest zone; those from the Kowloon side trying to join the protest had to wait up to an hour at a time to board cross-harbour Star Ferry from Tsim Sha Tsui. The size of the crowd forced police to open all the six lanes of Hennessy Road; the masses then also spilled over onto Lockhart Road and Jaffe Road – all three being parallel streets and major thoroughfares in Wan Chai.

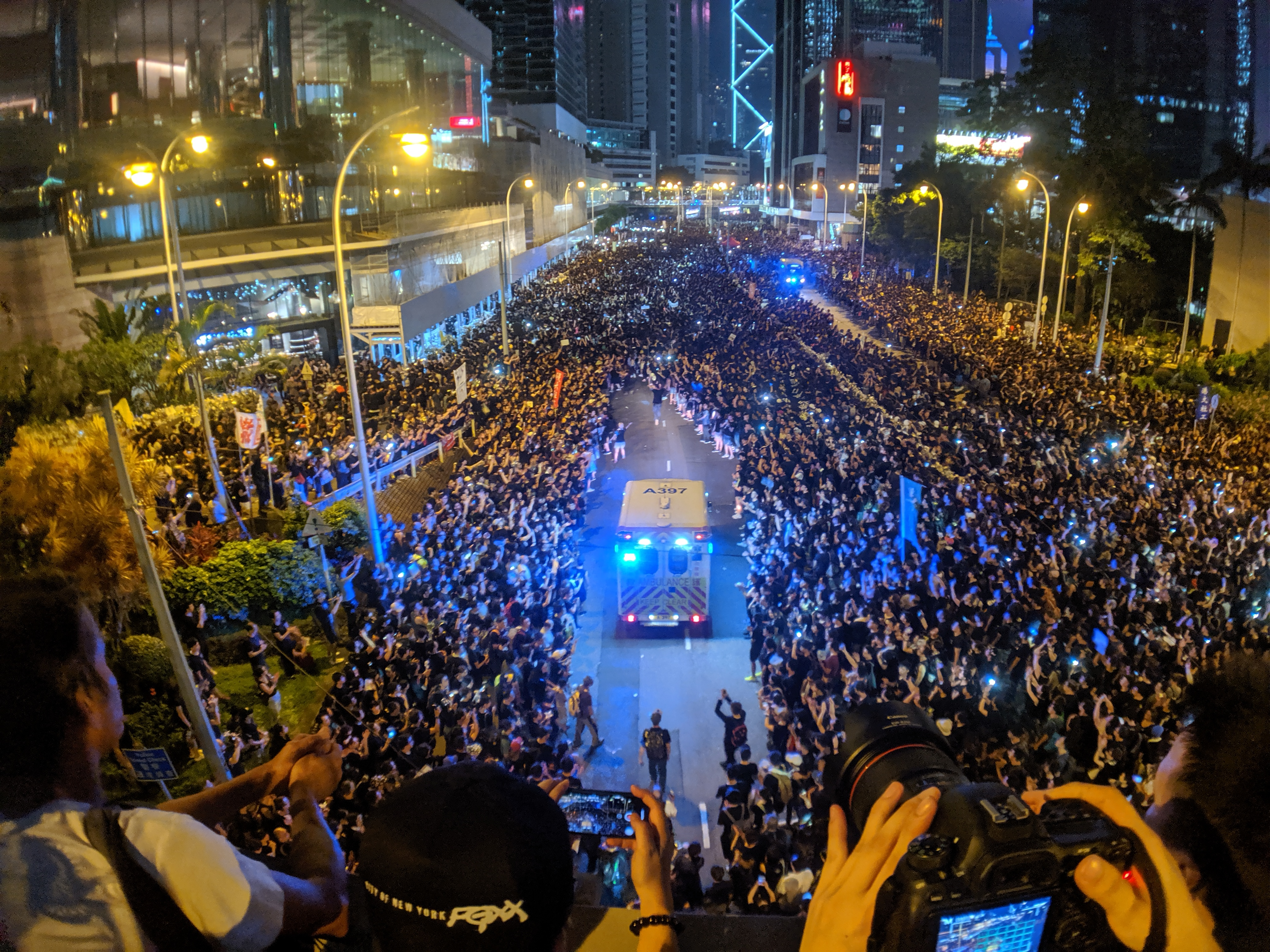
Protesters making way for an ambulance on Queensway at night.

The procession from Causeway Bay to Admiralty lasted from 3 pm to 11 pm. Marchers left bouquets and slogans on the site in front of Pacific Place where a man had committed suicide on 15 June. At night, protesters blocked Harcourt Road, causing traffic to grind to a halt. Protesters, however, allowed trapped vehicles – mainly franchised buses and emergency vehicles – to pass.

Early in the afternoon, Stand News, an independent online news agency, had used big data analysis to predict that there is a 72% chance that 1.44 million would have participated in the protest. The CHRF claimed the final turnout at "almost 2 million plus 1 citizens", which set the record of the largest protest in Hong Kong history. The police said that there were 338,000 marchers on the original route at its peak.

At 8:30 pm, the government issued a statement in which Carrie Lam apologised to Hong Kong residents and promised to "sincerely and humbly accept all criticism and to improve and serve the public."

=== 21 and 24 June police HQ sieges ===
A loose association of university-based protest groups, officially known as the Student's Unions of Higher Institutions, reiterated its four main as-yet unaddressed demands after not receiving any official response from the government. Further protests were called on 21 June.

At around 11 am, protesters gathered outside government headquarters and quickly blocked the traffic on Harcourt Road. Some of the protesters also marched to Hong Kong Police Headquarters in Wan Chai as Demosistō activist Joshua Wong, who was released from prison only a few days earlier after serving a sentence for his actions in the 2014 protests, urged the crowd to surround the complex. Dozens of protesters also staged a sit-in at the Revenue Tower and Immigration Tower nearby. Another round of blockade occurred three days later, on 24 June. On 26 June, protesters returned to the Revenue Tower to apologise to civil servants for the earlier disruption.

By the evening of 21 June, a siege had developed at the Police Headquarters as thousands of protesters amassed in Arsenal Street. South China Morning Post reported that protesters had "blocked the police headquarters' exits, threw eggs at the compound, drew graffiti on the walls, covered closed-circuit television cameras with tape, splashed oil on officers and targeted laser beams at police officers' eyes". The police took no action to disperse the protesters. The police sought medical attention for some staff members and had made a total of five ambulance calls by 9:33 pm. After the ambulance's arrival, the medics waited for tens of minutes in front of the gate of the police headquarter for the police to unlock it. The siege ended peacefully at 2:40 am as most of the protesters had left. Staff members and officers trapped inside the building evacuated via a back entrance to board waiting for coaches. The police blamed the protesters for the delayed treatment, though Hong Kong Fire Services Department stated that the protesters did not obstruct any rescue effort by the paramedics.

On 30 August, Joshua Wong and fellow activist Agnes Chow were arrested and appeared at court the same day, for inciting and participating in an unauthorised assembly, referring to the 21 June siege; in addition, Wong was charged with organising that assembly. Activist Ivan Lam, who at that time outside was not in Hong Kong, was also charged for incitement. Chow and Wong were granted bail the same day. On 2 December 2020, Chow, Lam, and Wong received prison sentences of 7, 10, and 13.5 months respectively in relation to their roles in the siege.

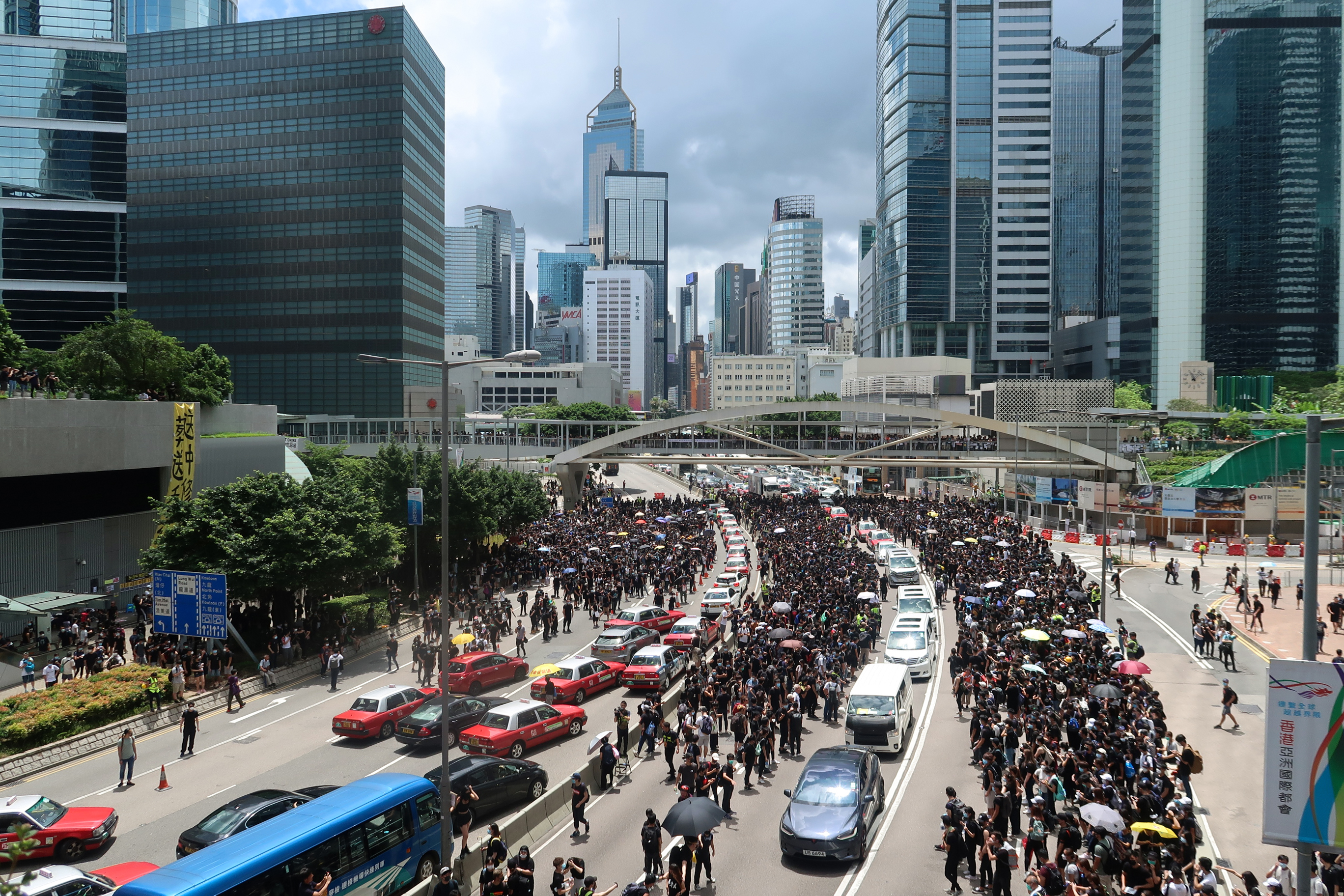
Protesters occupying Harcourt Road while allowing vehicles to leave.

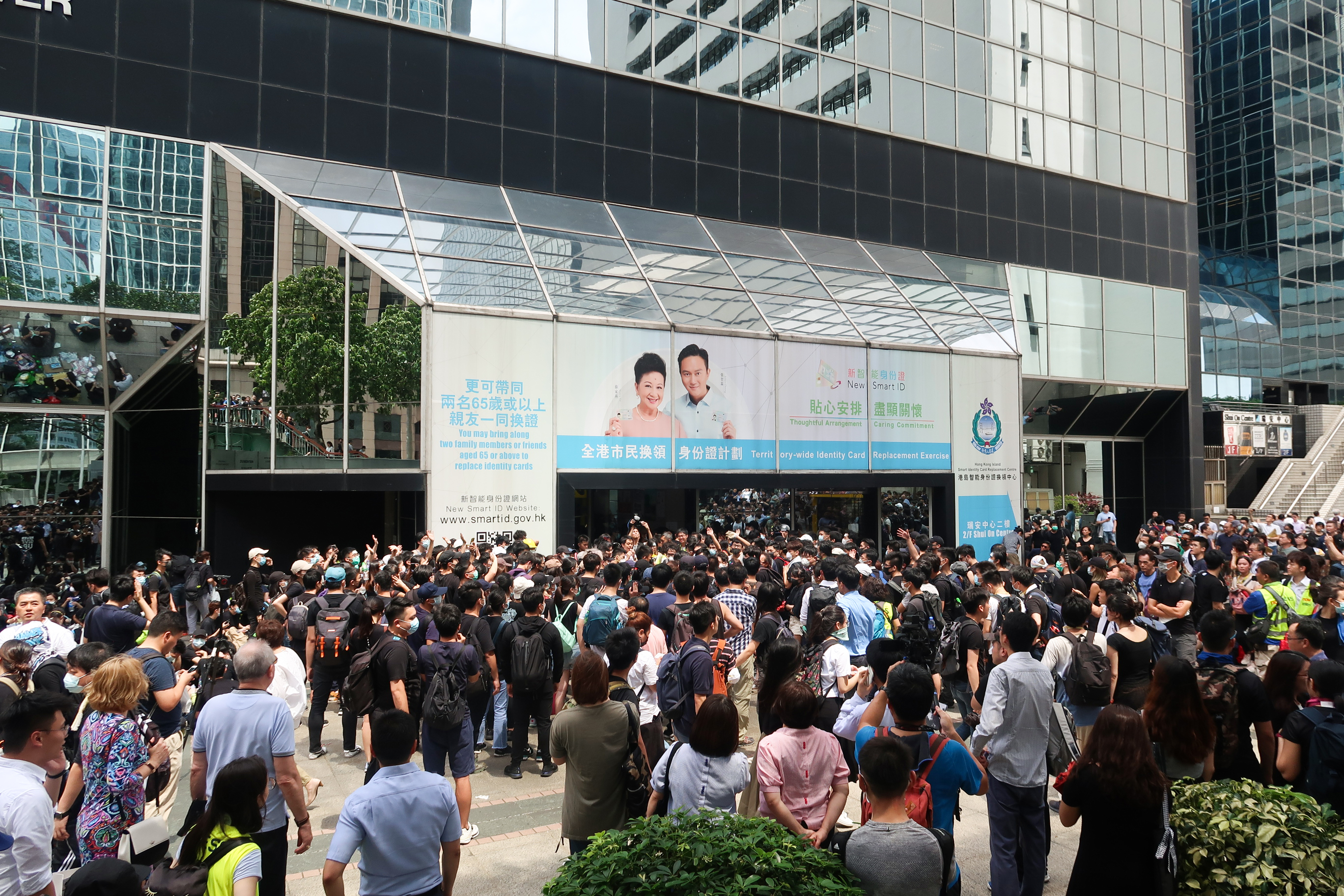
Protesters in Revenue Tower.

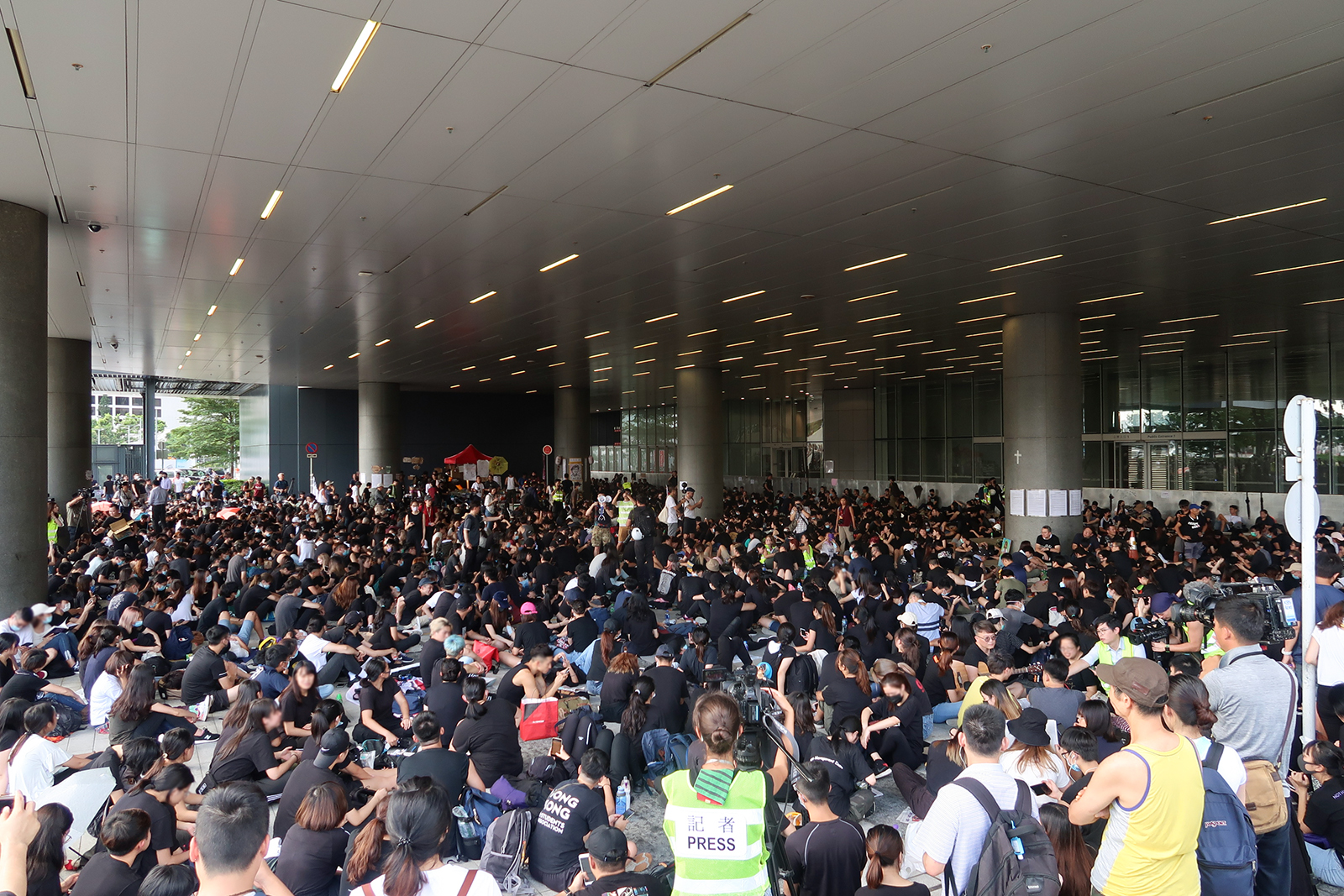
Protesters occupying the Legislative Council Complex.

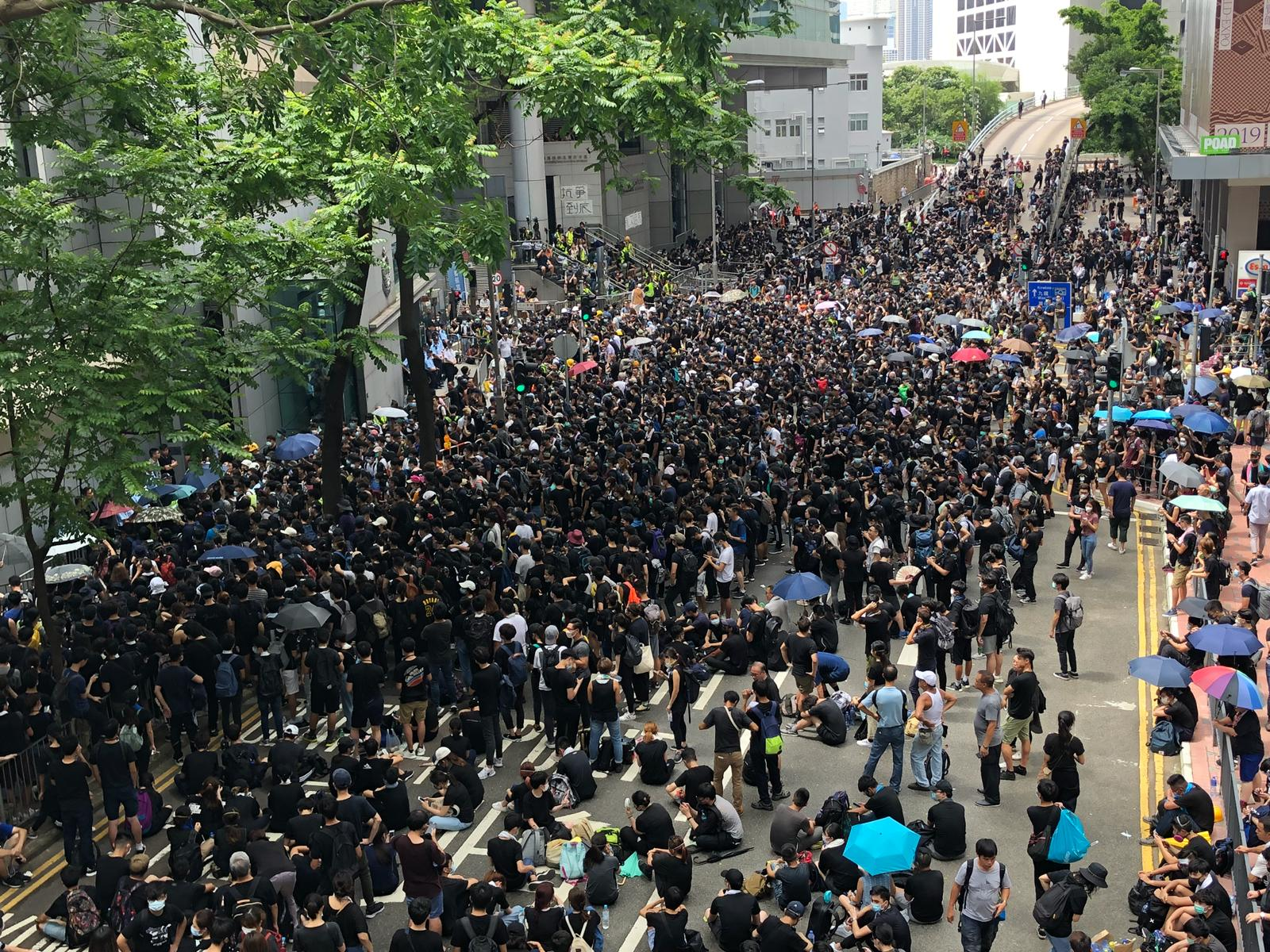
Protesters outside the Hong Kong Police Headquarters in Wan Chai.

=== 26 and 28 June G20 summit rallies ===
Protests occurred outside 19 foreign consulates in Hong Kong. Around 1,500 protesters during the day visited the consulates of countries expected to attend the G20 Osaka summit, handing out petitions to raise awareness of the movement in hopes of putting pressure on China. Meanwhile, there were solidarity protests in Osaka, Japan during the G20 Summit. China said it would not tolerate any discussion at the forum because "Hong Kong matters are purely an internal affair to China [in which] no foreign country has a right to interfere."

In the evening, thousands gathered for a rally outside the City Hall, shouting slogans of freedom and democracy. The protests stretched to the International Finance Centre, and spilled over into Lung Wo Road, blocking westbound traffic during the evening rush hour. Thousands of protesters then assembled at Edinburgh Place at night, holding signs that read "Democracy now" and "Free Hong Kong." At the same time, around 1,000 protesters surrounded the Wan Chai police headquarters for six hours. A white "Release All Activists" (「釋放義士」) vertical protest banner was hung at the entrance of the Hong Kong Police Headquarter demanding the release of protesters unjustly detained or arrested.

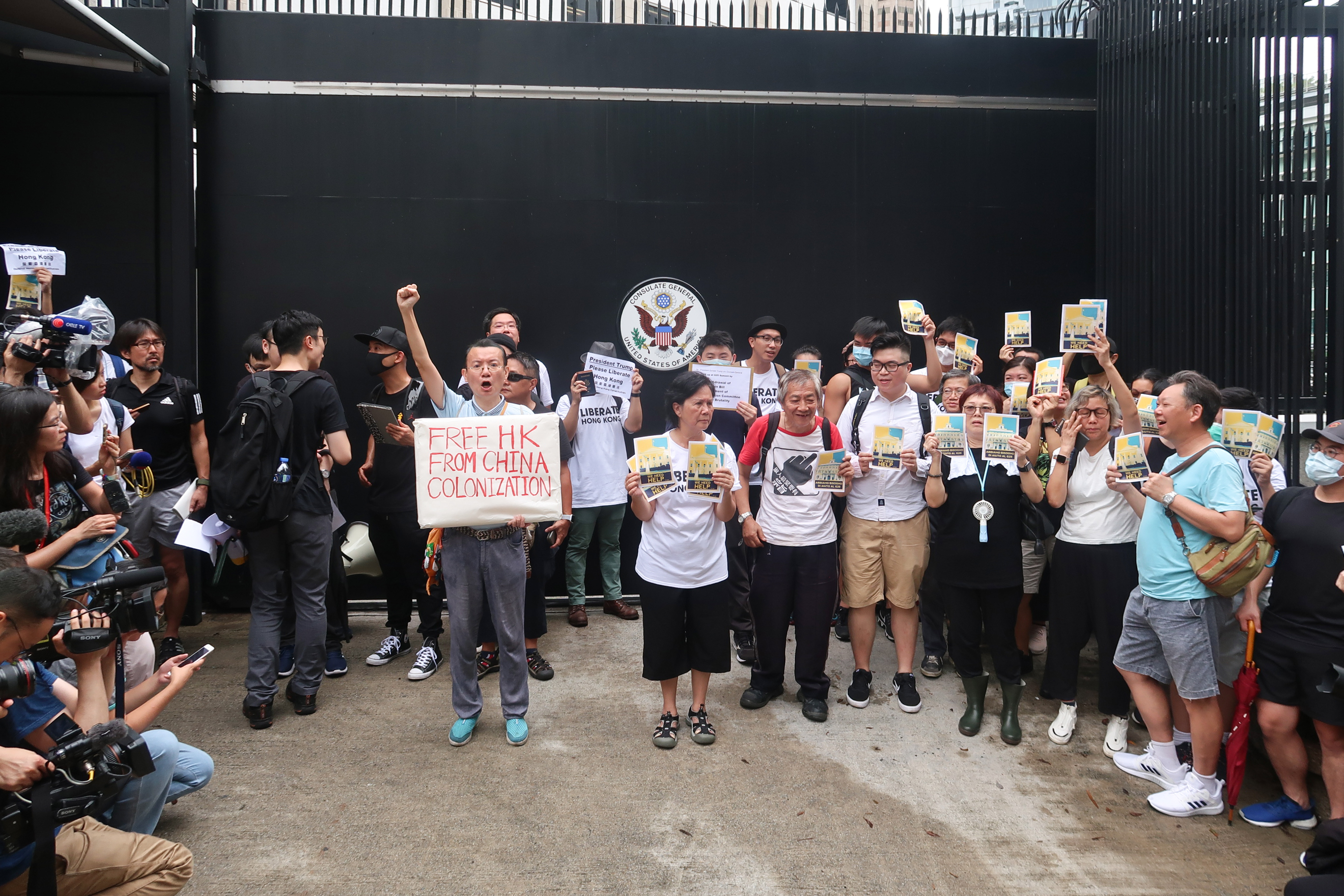
Protesters outside The Consulate General of the United States of America in Hong Kong and for Macau.

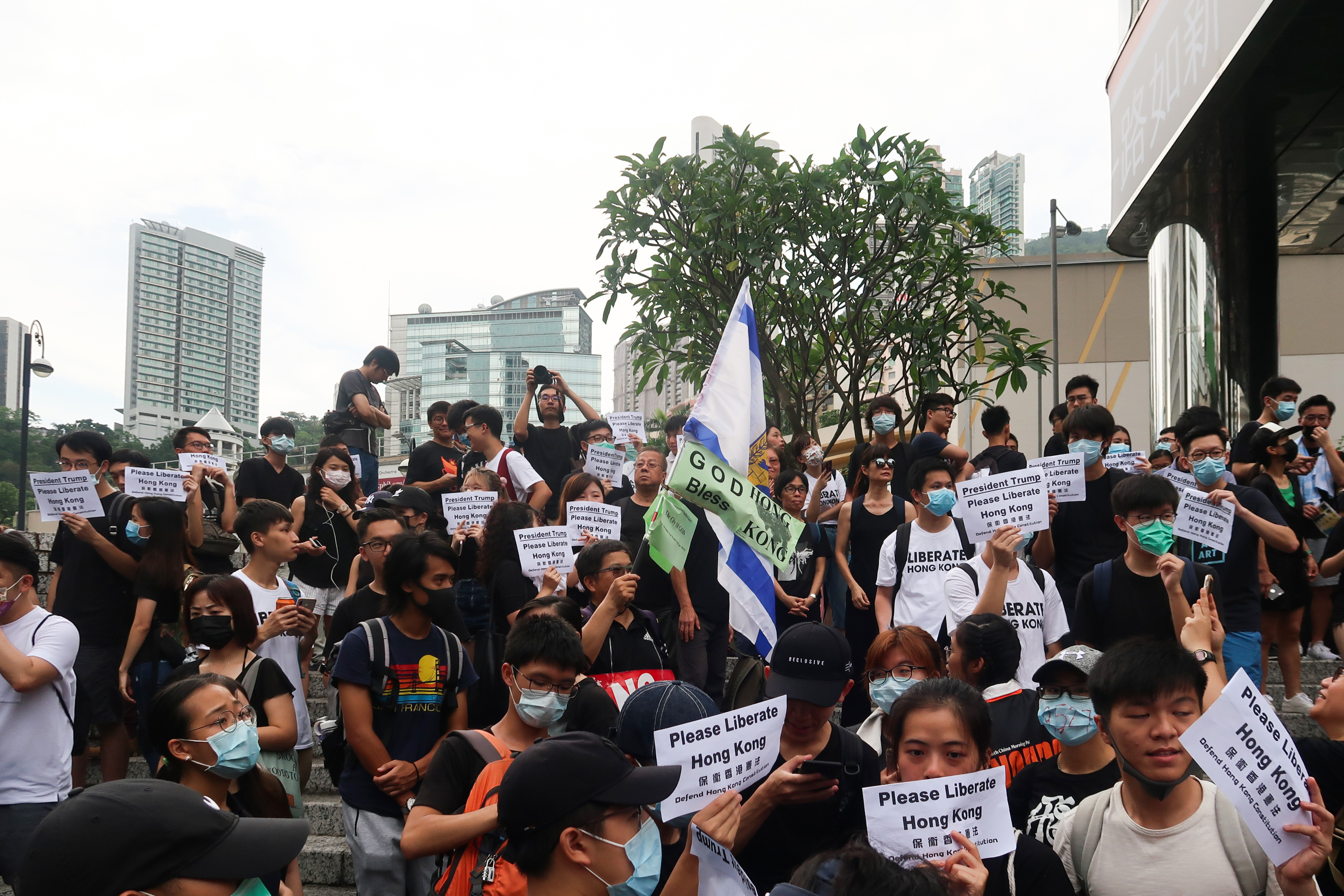
Protesters with messages saying "Please liberate Hong Kong" (with some messages having the words "President Trump" in front), and in the lower lines in Chinese and English: "Defend Hong Kong Constitution". One man is holding the flag of Jerusalem Municipality in the background.

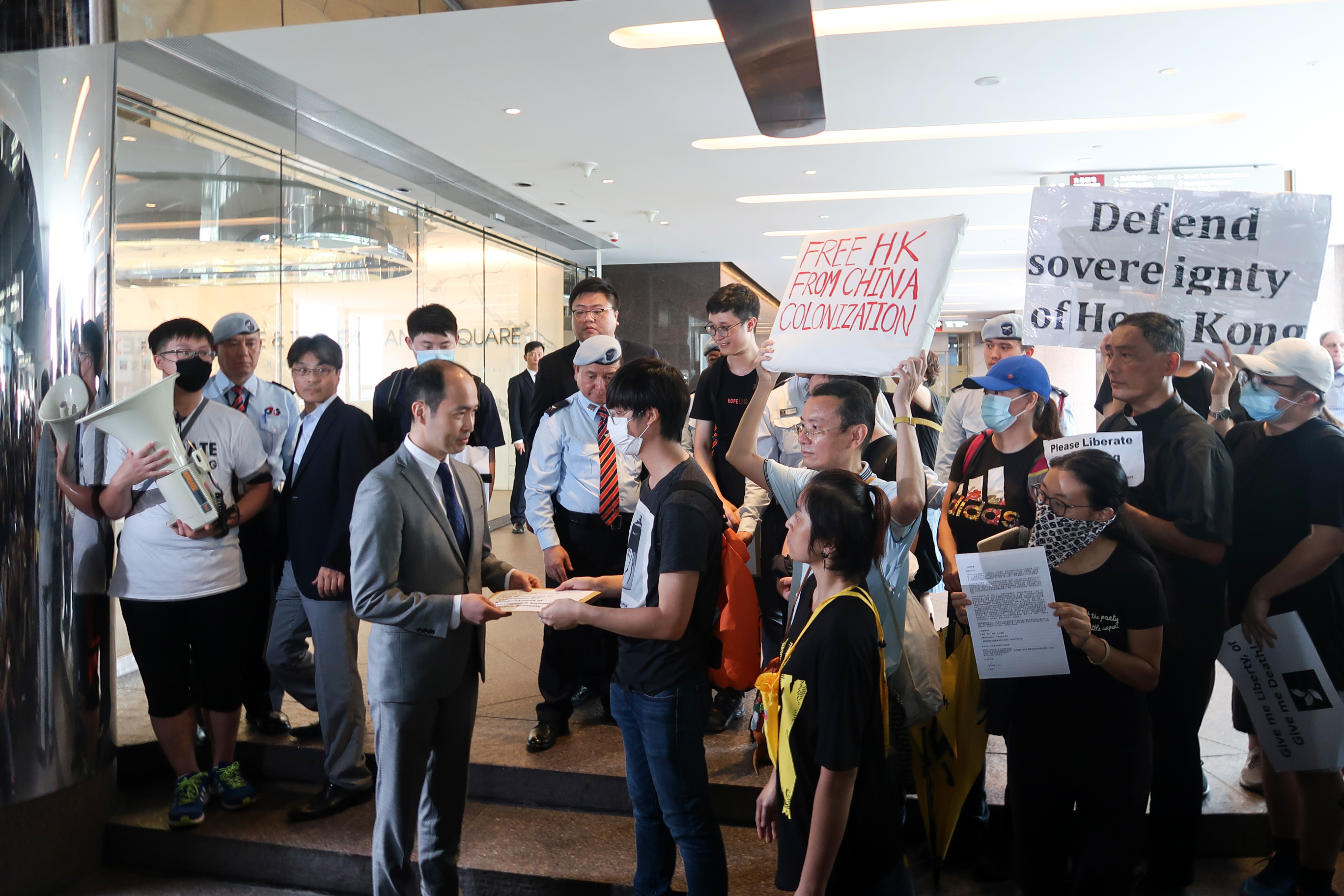
Protesters give letter to Consulate-General of Japan in Hong Kong representative (Yoshi Abe)

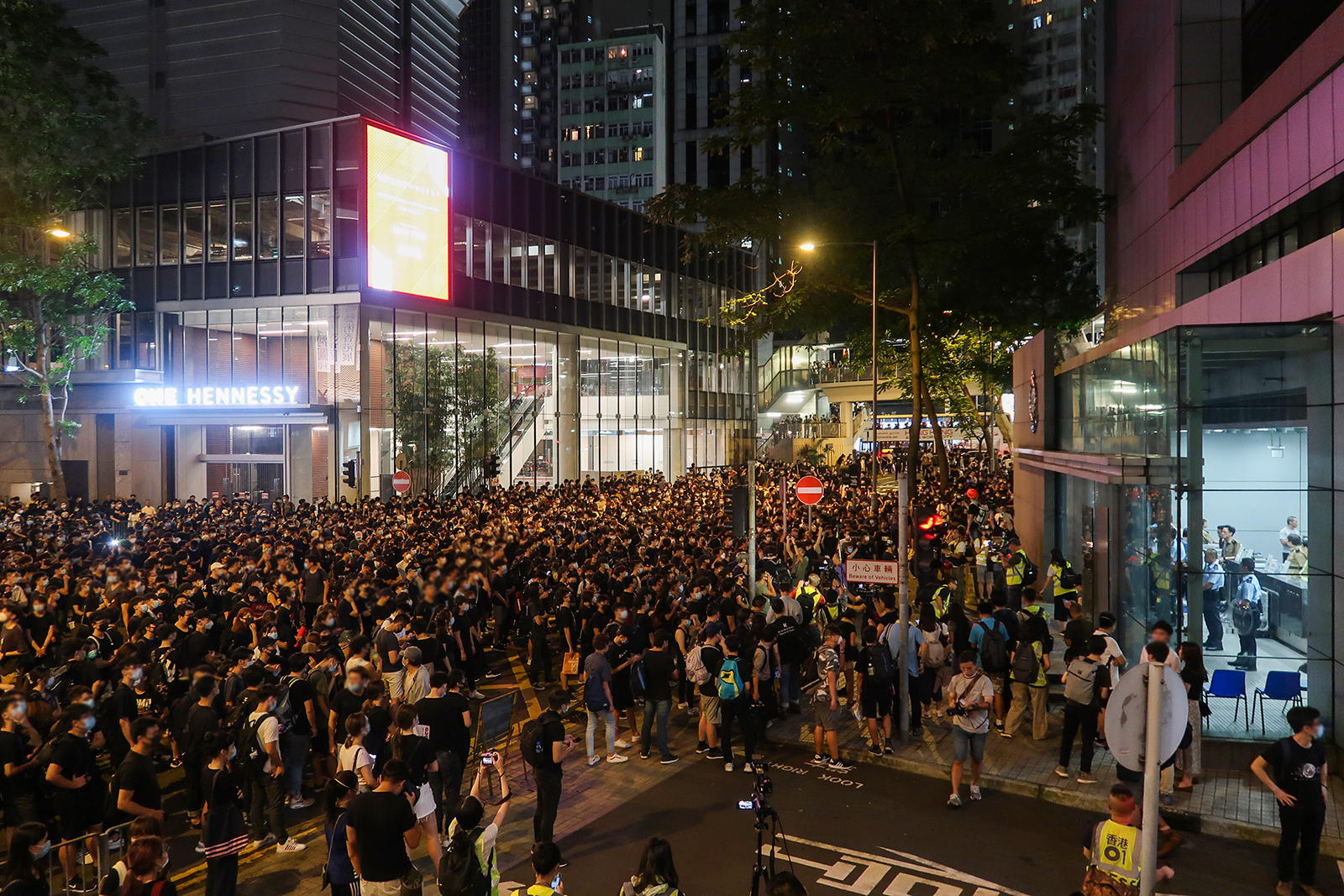
Protesters to block the roads and surround the police headquarters

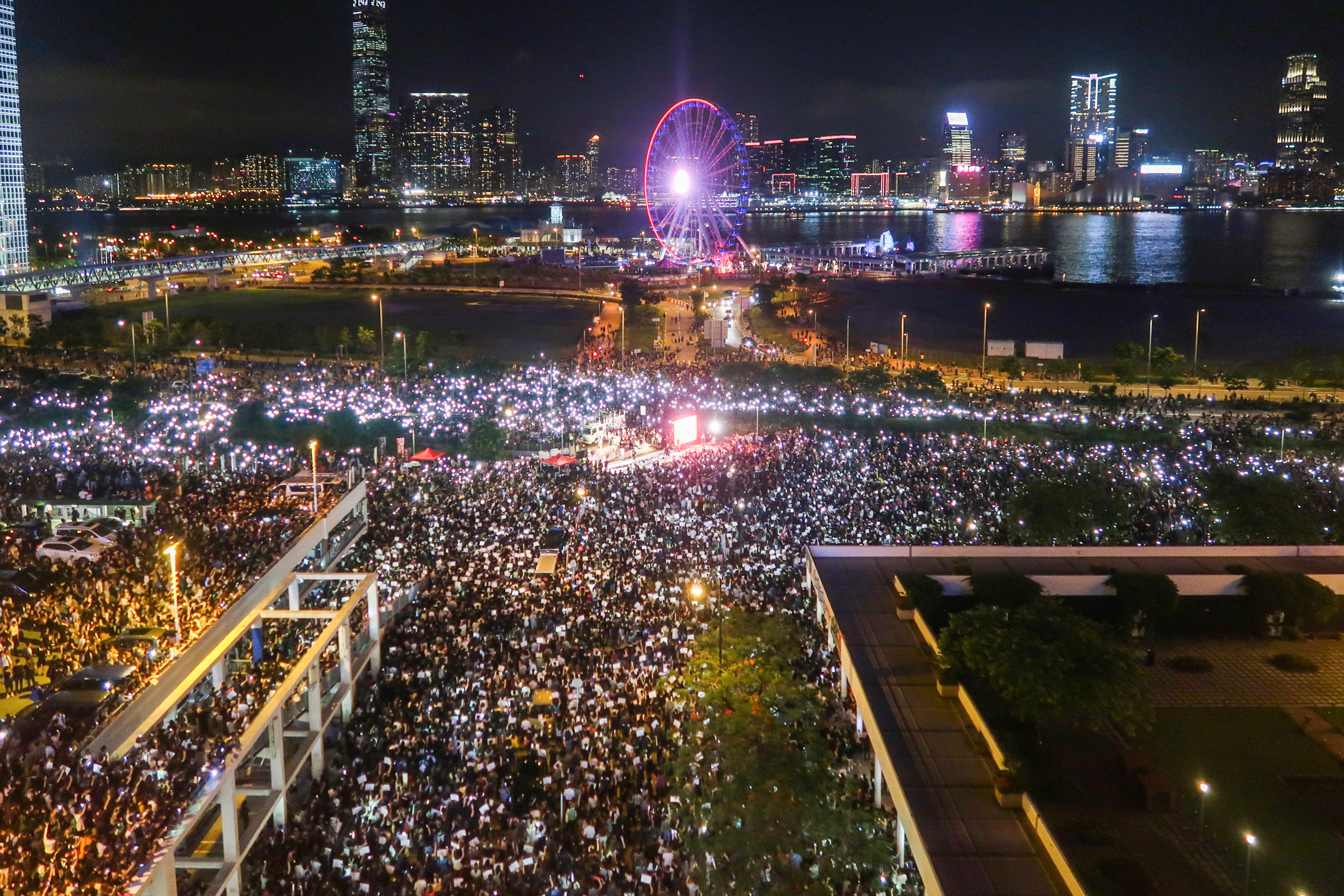
Protesters in Edinburgh Place calling on G20 country leaders to raise concerns at the summit.

=== 28 June Central Harbourfront protest ===
On 28 June, some of the G20 demonstrations also protested against the Hong Kong government's prospective surrender of a strip of land in Central Harbourfront to the People's Liberation Army on 29 June. In light of the protests on 27 June, Au Nok-hin's resolutions and Eddie Chu's proposal to delay the surrendering date were halted as pro-Beijing legislator Christopher Cheung requested an adjournment for debate to shift attention on restoring peace in Hong Kong. Chu and protesters entered the pier at around 11:30 pm. Protesters left the pier at midnight when its jurisdiction was legally turned over to PLA, though a standoff between the protesters and the police continued till 1 am.

== Counter-demonstrations ==
On 9 June, Around 20 supporters from the Safeguard Hong Kong Alliance, a pro-Beijing activist group showed up at the government quarters to support the bill a few hours before the anti-extradition bill protest.

On 16 June, around 40 protesters from the pro-Beijing Safeguard Hong Kong Alliance and the Hong Kong Federation of Trade Unions (HKFTU) protested outside the U.S. Consulate General in Central, condemning the US for allegedly interfering in the extradition law.

Hundreds of Pro-Beijing supporters gathered in Chater Garden in Central under the banner "Support Hong Kong Police Force, Blessing to Hong Kong" on 22 June; pro-Beijing figures such as legislator Priscilla Leung and pro-police campaigner Leticia Lee fronted the rally.

On 30 June, a more significant demonstration was organised by pro-Beijing legislator Junius Ho Kwan-yiu to show solidarity for the police and support for the extradition bill, taking place in front of the government headquarters in Tamar. Former police chief Tang King-shing and former deputy police commissioner Peter Yam Tat-wing (brother of actor Simon Yam) took to the podium, as did artists such as Alan Tam and Tony Leung. The organisers claimed that 165,000 people attended, while police cited 53,000. There were multiple confrontations as the pro-police supporters ran into small groups of anti-bill protesters wearing black, getting into arguments and scuffles with them as well with journalists covering the event. The Lennon Wall in Admiralty was destroyed by the pro-police supporters and pan-democratic Legislative Councillor Lam Cheuk-ting was physically assaulted.
