= Masterwork (disambiguation) =

Masterwork refers to masterpiece.

Masterwork may also refer to:

- Masterworks Advisers LLC, an American financial services company

== Arts and entertainment ==
=== Comics and graphic novels ===
- Marvel Masterworks, a line of hardcover collections reprinting classic Marvel Comics stories in chronological order since 1987
- DC Archive Editions, hardcover collections reprinting classic DC Comics stories with restored original artwork

=== Music and audio ===
- Columbia Masterworks Records, a classical music record label founded in 1924, now operated as Sony Classical Records

=== Gaming ===
- Masterwork items, enhanced equipment with superior attributes in video games such as Destiny 2, RuneScape, and Diablo IV
- Masterwork crafting, a game mechanic in role-playing video games for creating items with improved statistics and abilities

== See also ==
- Masterpiece
- Magnum opus
- Work of art
- Gesamtkunstwerk
- Pièce de résistance
