= Architectural office =

Architectural office may refer to:

- An architectural firm
- The predecessor of the Architectural Services Department of the Hong Kong government
