= Undertone =

Undertone or Undertones may refer to:

== Music ==
- Undertone series, a sequence of notes that results from inverting the intervals of the overtone series
- The Undertones, Northern Irish band
  - The Undertones (album), 1979 album by The Undertones
- Northwestern Undertones, a cappella group at Northwestern University, Evanston, Illinois, United States

== Other uses ==
- Operation Undertone, part of the Allied invasion of Germany in World War II
- Undertone (advertising company), a New York-based digital advertising company
- Undertone (film), a 2025 horror film
- An underlying or implied tendency or meaning; a subtext
- Skin undertone, as it applies to cosmetics; see color analysis (art)

== See also ==
- Overtones (disambiguation)
