= José Lei =

Hong Kong sports shooter 1930–2023

- Born: 30 October 1930; Portuguese Macau
- Died: 23 February 2023 (aged 92); Hong Kong

José Lei, ISO (Chinese: 李銘根, aka Lei Ming-kan, 30 October 1930 – 23 February 2023) was an architect and sports shooter. He was Director of the Hong Kong Architectural Services Department, and before that Chief Architect at the former Public Works Department. His designs include the Hong Kong Museum of Art and the Hong Kong Cultural Centre. He retired from public service in 1991.

While on the Hong Kong shooting team, he competed in two events at the 1968 Summer Olympics. He also competed at the 1966, 1970 and 1974 Asian Games. In 1989, Lei was made Companion of the Imperial Service Order.
