= Wanchai Tower =

Building in Wan Chai, Hong Kong

- 灣仔政府大樓
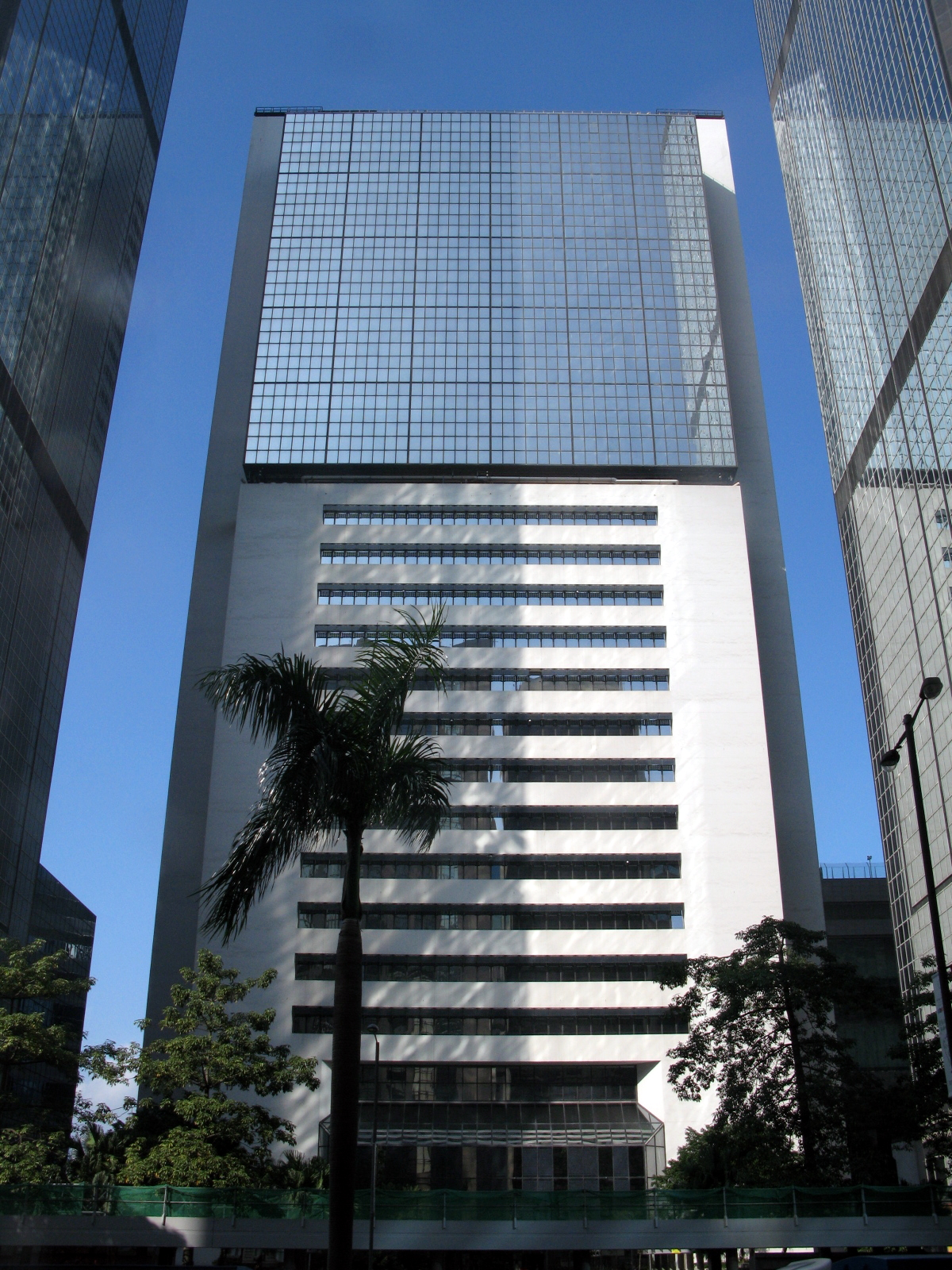
- View from Gloucester Road

- Location within Hong Kong

General information
- Status: Completed
- Type: Government building
- Architectural style: Modernist
- Location: 12 Harbour Road; Wan Chai, Hong Kong
- Coordinates: 22°16′48.02″N 114°10′20.48″E
- Completed: November 1986; 39 years ago
- Owner: Government of Hong Kong

Design and construction
- Architect: Architectural Services Department
- Engineer: Ng Chun Man & Associates
- Main contractor: Shui On Contractors

Wanchai Tower
- Traditional Chinese: 灣仔政府大樓
- Simplified Chinese: 湾仔政府大楼
- Literal meaning: Wan Chai Government Tower
Transcriptions
Standard Mandarin
- Hanyu Pinyin: Wān Zǎi Zhèngfǔ Dàlóu
Yue: Cantonese
- Yale Romanization: Wāan jái jing fú daaih làuh
- Jyutping: Waan1 zai2 zing3 fu2 daai6 lau4

Wanchai Tower is an office building in Wan Chai, Hong Kong. Located at 12 Harbour Road, it is home to the District Court and government offices. Neighbouring buildings include Immigration Tower, Revenue Tower and Shui On Centre.

== History ==
The building sits on land reclaimed from Victoria Harbour in the late 1960s and early 1970s. As Hong Kong grew rapidly, the territory suffered from a shortage of courtrooms. The government and judiciary first discussed building a new courthouse on the land in 1978. The site was temporarily used as an open-air car park.

The building was designed by the Architectural Services Department as well as Dennis Lau and Ng Chun Man Architects and Engineers (now DLN Architects). The HK$212-million construction contract was awarded to Shui On Contractors on 4 November 1984. Foundation and basement work had been completed under an earlier contract. Construction was completed in November 1986.

Originally, the building was built to house 16 district courts, four small claims courts, 12 magistrate's courts, two juvenile courts, four labour tribunals, and a lands tribunal. The existing Victoria and Kowloon district courts were relocated to the building, as was the Causeway Bay Magistracy, which was demolished to make way for Tin Hau station of the new Island line. The government offices were built to centralise the Data Processing Agency, Land Transport Agency, Music Office (of the Urban Council and Regional Council), Census and Statistics Department, Commercial Crimes Bureau, and Correctional Services Department.

When the Causeway Bay Magistracy was moved to the new Wanchai Tower, it was renamed Central Magistracy. In 1991, the Central Magistracy moved again, this time to the Eastern Law Courts Building, where it was renamed as Eastern Magistracy.

== Characteristics ==
Wanchai Tower is owned by the Hong Kong government. It occupies a site of 19,000 square metres (200,000 sq ft) between Gloucester Road and Harbour Road. The District Court occupies approximately 40,000 square metres (430,000 sq ft) of the building's lower floors. Government offices occupy about 25,000 square metres (270,000 sq ft) at the top of the building. The courts and government offices are separated by a refuge floor. The two building uses are expressed in contrasting facade treatments, with the government offices glazed in glass curtain wall.

== Future ==
Financial Secretary John Tsang announced in 2008 that the government would study the feasibility of relocating the departments housed within the Immigration Tower, Revenue Tower, and Wanchai Tower to Kai Tak and Tseung Kwan O New Town in order to open up the valuable Gloucester Road lands for private redevelopment. Surveyors estimated then that the site could fetch up to $20 billion if the site were auctioned by the government. The plan has garnered some criticism for moving government services to locations seen as less convenient. An area of Tseung Kwan O on Po Yap Road, named Area 67, is already zoned to house government offices.

Later, it was announced that the site will accommodate an expansion of the Hong Kong Convention and Exhibition Centre, which is located to the north, as well as office and hotel space.

In her 2017 policy address, Chief Executive Carrie Lam announced the government's proposal to construct a new District Court Complex at Caroline Hill to house the District Court, Family Court, and Lands Tribunal. The government also plans to relocate the government departments housed in Wanchai Tower, freeing the site for redevelopment.
