= Revenue Tower =

Building in Hong Kong

Revenue Tower 稅務大樓
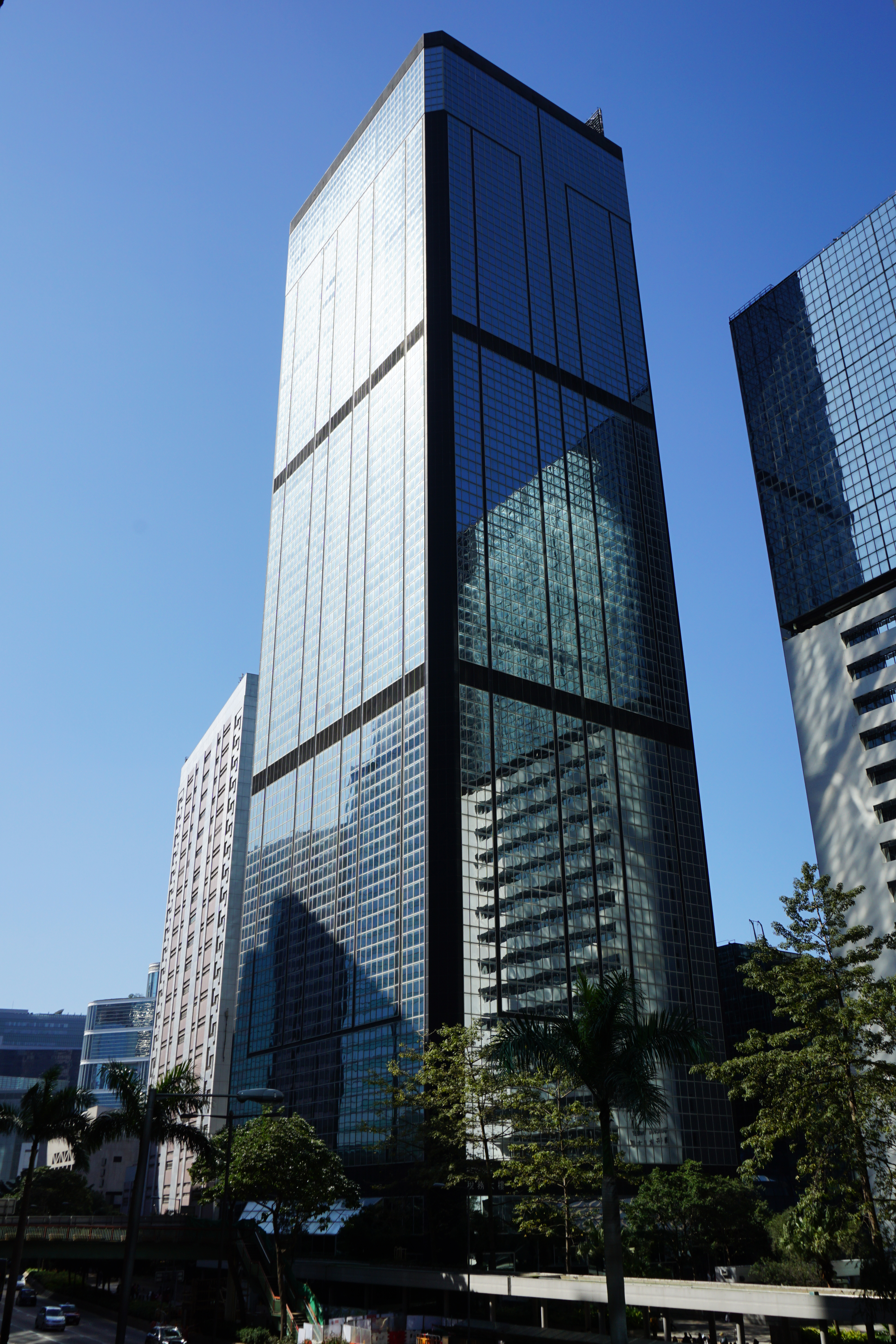
- Interactive map of the Revenue Tower 稅務大樓 area

General information
- Status: Completed
- Type: Office
- Location: No. 5 Gloucester Road, Wan Chai North, Hong Kong
- Coordinates: 22°16′47″N 114°10′19″E
- Completed: 1990; 36 years ago
- Opening: 1990; 36 years ago
- Owner: Government of Hong Kong

Height
- Roof: 181 m (594 ft)

Technical details
- Floor count: 49

Design and construction
- Architect: Architectural Services Department

Revenue Tower
- Traditional Chinese: 稅務大樓
- Simplified Chinese: 税务大楼
Transcriptions
Standard Mandarin
- Hanyu Pinyin: Shuìwù Dàlóu
Yue: Cantonese
- Yale Romanization: Seui mouh daaih làuh
- Jyutping: Soei3 mou6 daai6 lau4

The Revenue Tower is a skyscraper located in Wan Chai, Hong Kong. The tower rises 49 floors and 181 metres (594 ft) in height. The building was completed in 1990. The Revenue Tower, which stands as the 93rd-tallest building in Hong Kong, is composed entirely of office space. The building, along with its twin tower, the Immigration Tower, house government offices. The building is unique in that it houses a sky lobby on the 38th floor; this is designed to ease vertical transportation in the tower.

== History ==
The building was originally called Wanchai Tower III. The Inland Revenue Department relocated to the tower in December 1991 from their premises at Windsor House in Causeway Bay. In 1989, the opening of the Revenue Tower was projected to save the government $120 million annually in office space rental costs.

== Future ==
Financial Secretary John Tsang announced in 2008 that the government would study the feasibility of relocating the departments housed within the Immigration Tower, Revenue Tower, and Wanchai Tower to Kai Tak and Tseung Kwan O New Town in order to open up the valuable Gloucester Road lands for private redevelopment. Surveyors estimated then that the site could fetch up to $20 billion if the site were auctioned by the government. The plan has garnered some criticism for moving government services to locations seen as less convenient. An area of Tseung Kwan O on Po Yap Road, named Area 67, is already zoned to house government offices.

== See also ==
- List of tallest buildings in Hong Kong
