= Architectural Services Department =

Hong Kong government department

- 建築署

Agency overview
- Formed: 11 April 1986; 40 years ago
- Preceding agency: Architectural Office, Public Works Department
- Jurisdiction: Hong Kong
- Headquarters: Queensway Government Offices
- Motto: Driving Development, Preserving Heritage
- Employees: 1,989 (March 2026)
- Ministers responsible: Bernadette Linn, Secretary for Development; David Lam Chi-man, Under Secretary for Development
- Agency executive: Michael Li Kiu-yin, Director of Architectural Services
- Parent agency: Development Bureau
- Website: www.archsd.gov.hk

Architectural Services Department
- Traditional Chinese: 建築署
- Simplified Chinese: 建筑署
Transcriptions
Standard Mandarin
- Hanyu Pinyin: Jiànzhùshǔ
- Wade–Giles: Chien^{4} Chu^{4} Shu^{3}
Yue: Cantonese
- Yale Romanization: Gin jūk chyúh
- Jyutping: Gin^{3} zuk^{1} cyu^{5}

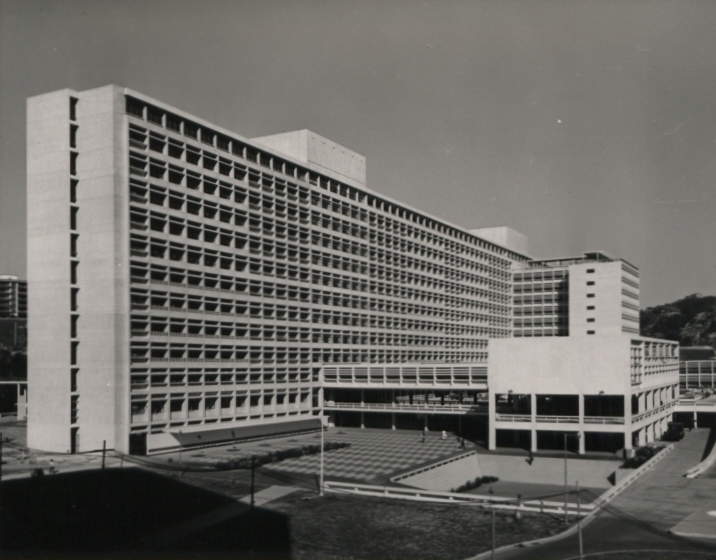
Queen Elizabeth Hospital in 1969

The Architectural Services Department is a department of the Government of Hong Kong responsible for the design and construction of many public facilities throughout the territory. It is subordinate to the Works Branch of the Development Bureau and the current director is Mr. LI Kiu Yin, Michael, JP.

== History ==
The origins of the Architectural Services Department lie in the Architectural Office, one of the sub-departments of the former Public Works Department (PWD). The PWD was founded in 1891, but the structure of the department at that time is reportedly unclear. The Architectural Office existed by 1939, and following the disruption in operations during the Japanese occupation, the unit was kept busy in the postwar years by rebuilding work. The 1948 annual report of the Public Works Department reported that 274 government buildings were repaired that year. During the 1960s the Architectural Office was heavily involved in the resettlement housing programmes, but these duties were divested to the Hong Kong Housing Authority upon its 1973 establishment.

The modern Architectural Services Department (abbreviated ASD or ArchSD) was founded in 1986, reporting directly to the Secretary of Lands and Works. Some of the most prolific clients of the department have been the Urban Council and Regional Council, and their successors the Leisure and Cultural Services Department and Food and Environmental Hygiene Department.

=== Significant projects (as architect) ===
- Edinburgh Place Ferry Pier (1957)
- Central Government Offices (1954–1959)
- Queen Elizabeth Hospital (1963)
- Murray Building (1969)
- Hong Kong Space Museum (1980)
- Prince Philip Dental Hospital (1981)
- Hong Kong Coliseum (1983)
- Supreme Court Building (1984)
- Kowloon Central Library (1985)
- Wanchai Tower (1985)
- Queensway Government Offices (1986)
- Hong Kong Railway Museum (1986)
- Sha Tin Town Hall complex (1987)
- Tuen Mun Town Hall complex (1987)
- Hong Kong Cultural Centre (1989)
- Immigration Tower (1990)
- Revenue Tower (1990)
- Hong Kong Museum of Art (1991)
- Tai A Chau refugee detention centre (1991)
- Regional Council chambers and Regional Services Department headquarters (1991)
- Pamela Youde Nethersole Eastern Hospital (1992)
- Hong Kong Stadium (1994) with HOK Sport
- Kowloon Walled City Park (1995)
- Siu Sai Wan Sports Ground (1996)
- Hong Kong Institute of Education (1997) with P&T Architects
- Cheung Sha Wan Government Offices (1999)
- Sheung Shui Slaughterhouse (1999)
- Kwai Tsing Theatre (1999)
- Hong Kong Museum of Coastal Defence (2000)
- Hong Kong Central Library (2001)
- Stanley Municipal Services Building (2005)
- Hong Kong Wetland Park Visitor Centre (2006)
- Tuen Mun Hospital Rehabilitation Block (2007)

== Directors ==
- José Lei, 1986-1991
- Paul Jeremy Corser, 1991-1993
- Kenneth Chan, September 1993–April 1997
- Pau Shiu-hung (鮑紹雄), October 1997–2 November 2002
- Yue Chi-hang (余熾鏗), 3 November 2002 – 4 July 2009
- Marigold Lau Lai Siu-wan (劉賴筱韞), 5 July 2009 – 16 October 2011
- Leung Koon-kee (梁冠基), 17 October 2011 – 9 December 2017
- Mrs Sylvia Lam Yu Ka-wai (林余家慧), from 10 December 2017
- Winnie Ho (何永賢), from 18 December 2020 to 1 July 2022
- Michael Li Kiu-yin (李翹彥), from 30 December 2023 to present

== Notes ==
References

- Chung Wah Nan (1989). Contemporary Architecture in Hong Kong. Hong Kong: Joint Publishing (H.K.) Co. Ltd.
- ArchSD Review (97) (1997). Architectural Services Department. Hong Kong: China Trend Building Press.
- ArchSD Review (99) (1999). Architectural Services Department: The New Millennium. Hong Kong: China Trend Building Press.
