= Immigration Tower =

Building in Wan Chai, Hong Kong

Immigration Tower 入境事務大樓
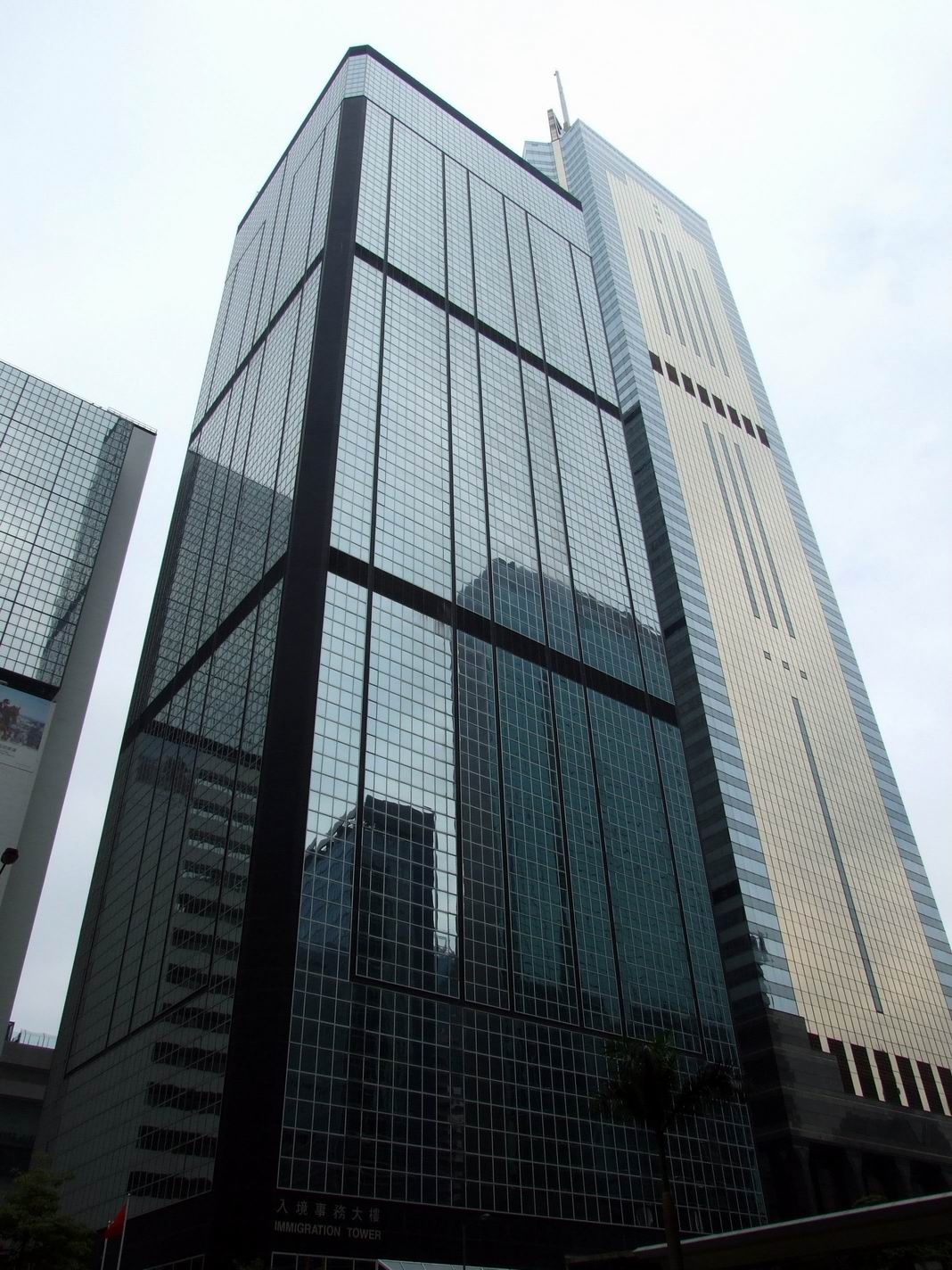
- Immigration Tower in November 2007

General information
- Location: No. 7 Gloucester Road, Wan Chai North, Hong Kong
- Coordinates: 22°16′47″N 114°10′23″E
- Completed: 1990; 36 years ago
- Owner: Government of Hong Kong

Height
- Roof: 181 m (594 ft)

Technical details
- Floor count: 49

Design and construction
- Architect: Architectural Services Department

Immigration Tower
- Traditional Chinese: 入境事務大樓
- Simplified Chinese: 入境事务大楼
Transcriptions
Standard Mandarin
- Hanyu Pinyin: Rùjìng Shìwù Dàlóu
Yue: Cantonese
- Yale Romanization: Yahp gíng sih mouh daaih làuh
- Jyutping: Jap6 ging2 si6 mou6 daai6 lau4

Immigration Tower is a skyscraper located in the Wan Chai District of Hong Kong completed in 1990. The tower rises 49 floors and 181 metres (594 ft) in height. Immigration Tower, which stands as the 93rd-tallest building in Hong Kong, is composed entirely of office space. The building houses government offices, principally those of the Immigration Department.

== Design ==
Immigration Tower is part of a three-tower complex of government offices surrounding the Gloucester Road Garden. The other two towers are the Wanchai Tower and the Revenue Tower. These government buildings were designed by the Architectural Services Department for the Government Property Agency. The Revenue Tower is nearly identical in design to the Immigration Tower.

Most of the floors in the Immigration Tower are designed as open plan offices, which increases flexibility for tenants. For these floors, the usable floor area is as much as 80% of the gross floor area. The tower incorporates a sky lobby on the 38th storey to facilitate vertical transportation. The building is linked to Wan Chai station by a long footbridge, and so there are entrances and lobbies at both the ground level and the first floor.

The dominant tenant is the Immigration Department, and the building is heavily visited by members of the public who rely on the department for the issuance of Hong Kong identity cards and all types of visa. The lowest levels of the tower are thus served by escalators in order to accommodate the high patronage of the services found there. The Immigration Department maintains several unique facilities in the building. A restricted vault holds a collection of volumes dating back to 1873 which records in detail the births and deaths over the years, including information such as the occupation of new fathers or the causes of deaths. The oldest extant marriage registry is from 1945, as earlier volumes were lost during World War II. The department also maintains a small detention facility on the 13th floor.

There was a giant Philips advertisement on the roof between 1995 and 2014, facing Kowloon, publicised in 2007 as the largest LED display panel in Hong Kong.

== History ==
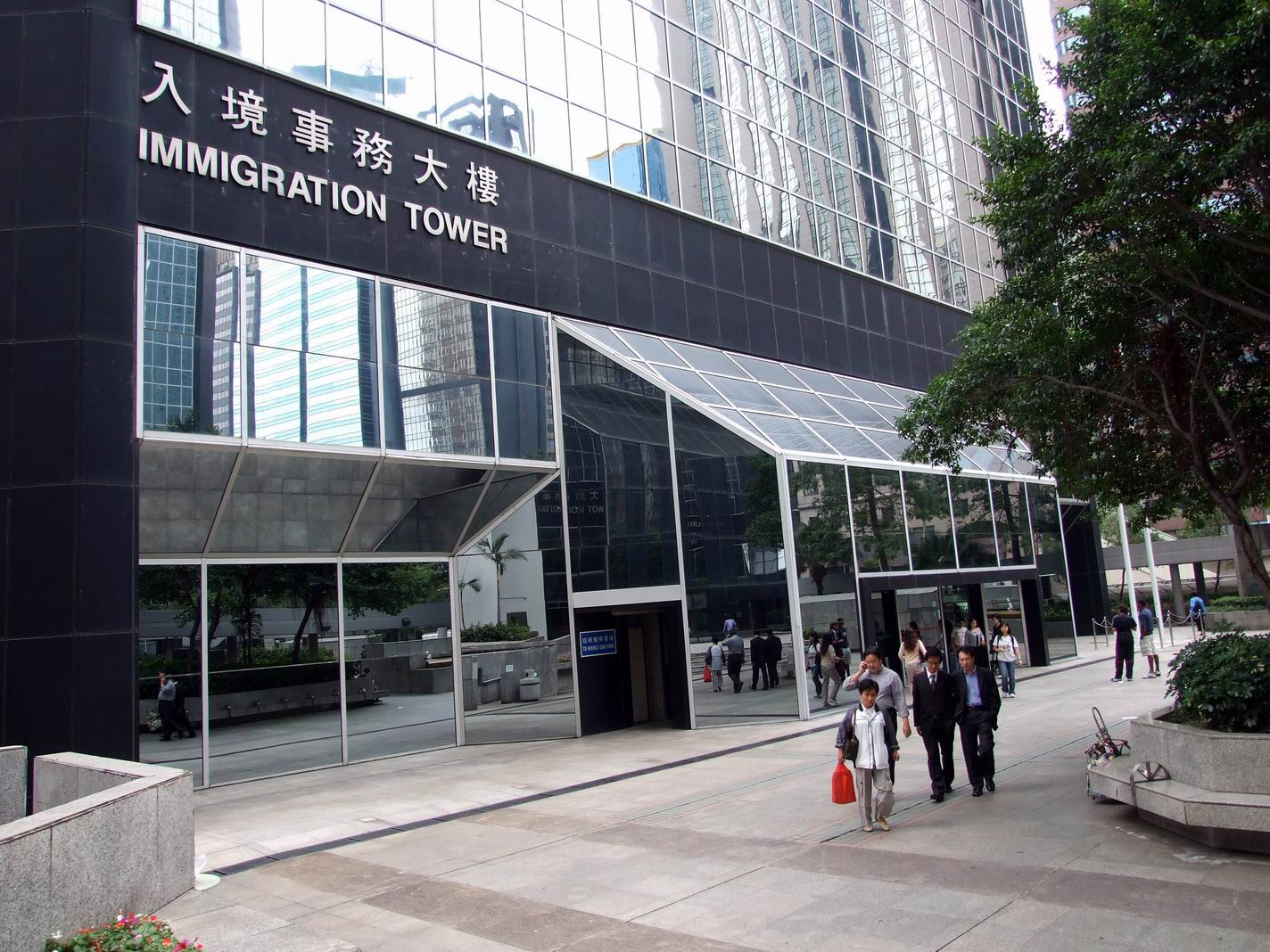
Ground floor entrance in November 2007

=== Opening ===
Immigration Tower opened on 22 January 1990. The tower was built as part of a large government development on an 18,500 square metre site within the Wan Chai reclamation. The tower was originally known as Wanchai Tower II (灣仔政府綜合大樓第二座), following its earlier neighbour, the Wanchai Tower. Likewise, the Revenue Tower was originally known as Wanchai Tower III. In addition to the government offices the overall development also included a garden and a fire station. In 1989, the commissioning of Immigration Tower was expected to achieve annual rental savings of $46.8 million for the government. The Immigration Department previously occupied 13 storeys of Mirror Tower in Tsim Sha Tsui East. The Chinese name of Immigration Tower changed from "人民入境事務大樓" to "入境事務大樓" when the Chinese name of the Immigration Department changed upon the 1997 handover of sovereignty from Britain.

=== Curtain wall failure ===
The glass curtain wall facade has suffered several failures during inclement weather. The building lost 40–50 sheets of glass during a 1994 typhoon. During Typhoon York in 1999, the tower and its twin, the Revenue Tower, together saw more than 370 panes of glass shatter. After this incident, the Architectural Services Department defended the standards of government building design and maintenance, stating that wind load tests for the curtain wall systems of the Immigration and Revenue towers were duly carried out in Florida, that the curtain walls met the wind load requirements of the Buildings Ordinance, and that the incident was an isolated occurrence caused by the strongest typhoon to hit Hong Kong in 16 years.

=== 1996 passport rush ===
In early 1996, hundreds of thousands of Hong Kongers who did not already hold British passports rushed to Immigration Tower to apply for British Dependent Territories citizenship in order to acquire British National (Overseas) passports later on. The cut-off date for British naturalisation was midnight on Sunday, 30 March 1996. More than 700 immigration officers worked throughout the final weekend, round the clock, processing 3,000 applications per hour. The massive queues were made worse by China's hardening stance toward Hong Kong, with Beijing announcing it would dismantle Hong Kong's democratic institutions following the handover, as well as the recent Chinese missile launches near Taiwan that Beijing admitted were intended to undermine the 1996 Taiwanese democratic presidential elections. Many Hong Kongers were thus prompted to acquire the BNO passport as a form of insurance amid rising uncertainty in Hong Kong's future. The Immigration Department announced that anyone who reached the queue before Sunday at midnight would be allowed to apply. That night, a queue of nearly 60,000 snaked from Immigration Tower to Wan Chai Sports Ground, which the government hired to accommodate the crowd. Numerous fistfights broke out.

=== 2000 accidental fire ===
The tower suffered an accidental fire in March 2000 which began in a ground-floor transformer room and burned for two hours, spreading smoke as high as the 39th storey, and injuring one person.

=== 2000 arson attack ===
Around the turn of the millennium, the tower was the site of continual occupation by Mainland Chinese activists, led by Shi Junlong (施君龍), demanding right of abode in Hong Kong. At 2:00 pm on 2 August 2000, visa overstayers petitioned immigration officers to issue them Hong Kong identity cards on the spot. The officers refused on the basis of the law, and told them to apply in writing. They refused to leave, staging a sit-in until closing time at 6:00 pm when staff attempted to evict the protesters, who responded by splashing highly flammable paint thinner around the 13th storey and setting it ablaze with cigarette lighters. A massive fireball engulfed the crowded room 1301 and shot into the corridor where others were standing. Some 50 people, immigration officers and protesters alike, were injured in the resultant conflagration before it was extinguished by the building sprinkler system.

Two people died in the following days. Senior Immigration Officer Leung Kam-kwong, who had tried to protect his colleagues from being splashed with the flammable liquid and had sustained burns to 65 percent of his body after being set on fire, died in hospital. A 26-year-old protester also died on 11 August.

The actions of the protesters were widely condemned in Hong Kong. Chief Executive Tung Chee-hwa expressed his anger and stated that such "brutal behaviour, irrational behaviour" was "totally unacceptable", and praised the "professionalism and courage" of the killed officer Leung Kam-kwong. Secretary for Security Regina Ip was "shocked and angered by this irrational and violent action" and said the incident would not pressure the government to accede to the demands of the perpetrators. Director of Immigration Ambrose Lee stated that the same group of protesters had made the same demands of his department numerous times and "we have told them each time that we cannot help them and they must respect the rule of law" and that he felt "very sorry and very sad for [his] staff." Liberal Party chairman James Tien called on the government to repatriate all the overstayers.

Seven of the Mainland arsonists were sentenced to prison in 2002. The so-called ringleader, Shi Junlong, was sentenced to life in prison for two offences of murder and one count of arson, while six accomplices were jailed for 12 to 13 years for two counts of manslaughter and one arson offence each. Following sentencing, Shi Junlong showed no remorse and stated in Chinese that the crime was "a tragedy created by the Immigration Department". After appealing, the arsonists were granted a retrial, at which they won sharply reduced sentences for pleading guilty to the lesser crime of two counts of manslaughter by gross negligence. A third count of arson was dropped in exchange for the guilty pleas. Shi Junlong was released from prison in 2005 and extradited to Mainland China. In 2013, he acquired right of abode in Hong Kong through legal channels to much media attention and public outcry.

On 12 September 2000, the Executive Council advised and the Chief Executive ordered that Immigration Officer Leung should be given permanent earth burial at Gallant Garden. Spurred by the circumstances of Leung's death, the government added an exemption clause to the six-year exhumation policy in public cemeteries applicable to people who died carrying out an "exceptional act of bravery". Leung was thus the first civil servant to be permanently buried at Gallant Garden. His family has emigrated from Hong Kong.

Several immigration officers were later honoured for gallantry during the attack. Leung Kam-kwong posthumously received the Medal for Bravery (Gold). Immigration officer Choi To received the Medal for Bravery (Silver). Hui Chun-kit, Mak King-yeung, Fung Tai- kwong, and Lo Shu-tsun were all awarded the Medal for Bravery (Bronze).

== Tenants ==
- Office of Carrie Lam
- Water Supplies Department headquarters
- Immigration Department Travel Documents Section
- Torture Claims Appeal Board
- Transport Department headquarters
  - Area Traffic Control Centre
  - Emergency Transport Coordination Centre
  - Traffic Control and Surveillance Systems Centre

=== Former tenants ===
- Audit Commission headquarters (moved to Queensway Government Offices)
- Create Hong Kong
- Immigration Department headquarters (until June 2024)
- Insider Dealing Tribunal office (closed in 2009)
- Innovation and Technology Commission (Quality Services Division sub-office)
- Securities and Futures Appeals Tribunal (moved to Queensway Government Offices)
- The Treasury (moved to Treasury Building)

== Future ==
Financial Secretary John Tsang announced in 2008 that the government would study the feasibility of relocating the departments housed within the Immigration Tower, Revenue Tower, and Wanchai Tower to Kai Tak and Tseung Kwan O New Town in order to open up the valuable Gloucester Road lands for private redevelopment. Surveyors estimated then that the site could fetch up to $20 billion if the site were auctioned by the government. The plan garnered some criticism for moving government services to locations seen as less convenient. An area of Tseung Kwan O on Po Yap Road, named Area 67, was already zoned to house government offices.

In 2014 it was reported that the Immigration Department will indeed be moved to the Tseung Kwan O site. The Gloucester Road government lands are now reportedly valued at $30 billion.

The relocation of the three Wan Chai buildings affects 29 government departments, 175,000 square metres of floor area and more than 10,000 staff. The move will be implemented in phases to a number of different locations. About one-fifth of the new West Kowloon Government Offices, which started construction in 2015, is designated to receive some of the displaced departments from Wan Chai.

In 2017, however, the Chief Executive announced that Immigration Tower, along with other two government buildings, would be redeveloped as the new wing of Convention and Exhibition Centre rather than for private development. With this integrated plan, it is estimated to bring 23,000 additional square metres for convention and exhibition. Hotel or grade A office space will also be built on top side of the centre.

The government has set a 2027 deadline for all tenants to move out of the building. However, the office of former Chief Executive Carrie Lam was moved to the 23rd floor of the building in 2025, sparking concerns over whether or not the government was pessimistic about future demand for high-grade office buildings.

== See also ==
- List of tallest buildings in Hong Kong
