= Sky lobby =

Intermediate interchange floor in a skyscraper

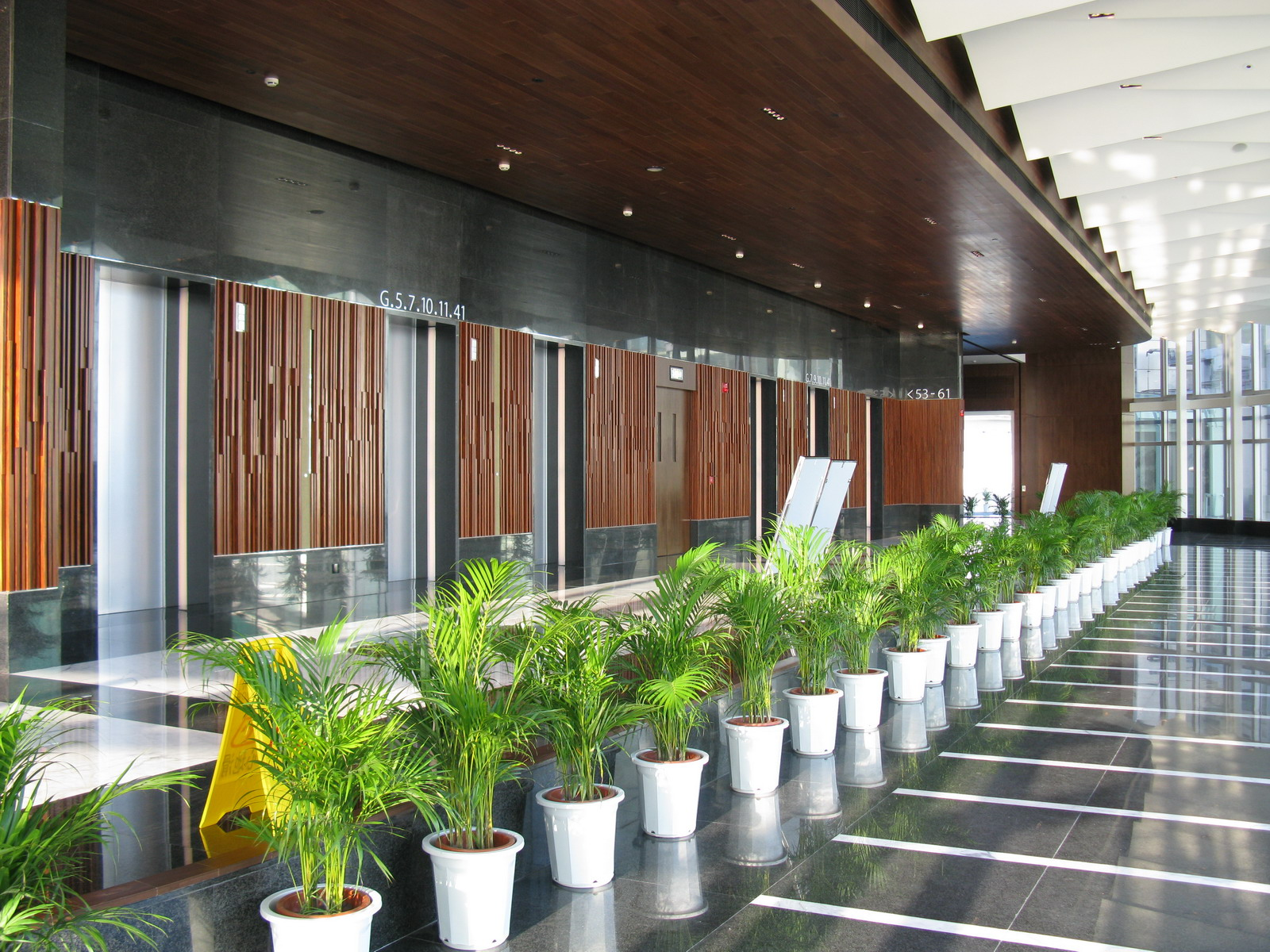
A bank of express elevators in the Nina Tower sky lobby

A sky lobby is an intermediate interchange floor in a skyscraper where people can change from an express elevator that stops only at the sky lobby to a local elevator that stops at a subset of higher floors.

Early uses of the sky lobby include the original Twin Towers of the World Trade Center and 875 North Michigan Avenue (John Hancock Center) in Chicago.

== World Trade Center (Manhattan) ==
The former World Trade Center, designed by Minoru Yamasaki, used sky lobbies, located on the 44th and 78th floors of each tower.

The Twin Towers of the original World Trade Center were among the first buildings to utilize sky lobbies. The 110-story towers had sky lobbies on the 44th and 78th floors, from which four banks of local elevators provided access to other floors, a design inspired by the New York City Subway. The inclusion of sky lobbies resulted in more usable office space on each floor while also rendering construction beyond the 80th floor economically feasible.

Nearly 200 people were estimated to have been in the 78th floor sky lobby of the South Tower of the original World Trade Center when it was hit directly by United Airlines Flight 175, leaving only around a dozen who survived the impact and escaped the tower before it collapsed.

The present-day One World Trade Center is the tallest skyscraper in New York City. Like the buildings it replaced, the new building has a sky lobby to reduce the amount of space devoted to elevators. The sky lobby is on the 64th floor; each set of five to six stories is served by a separate bank of elevators. The elevators to the sky lobby, along with the ones used for the nonstop service to the 100th-floor One World Observatory, are the fastest in the Western Hemisphere. The observatory elevator transports passengers 100 floors in under one minute.

== 875 North Michigan Avenue (Chicago) ==
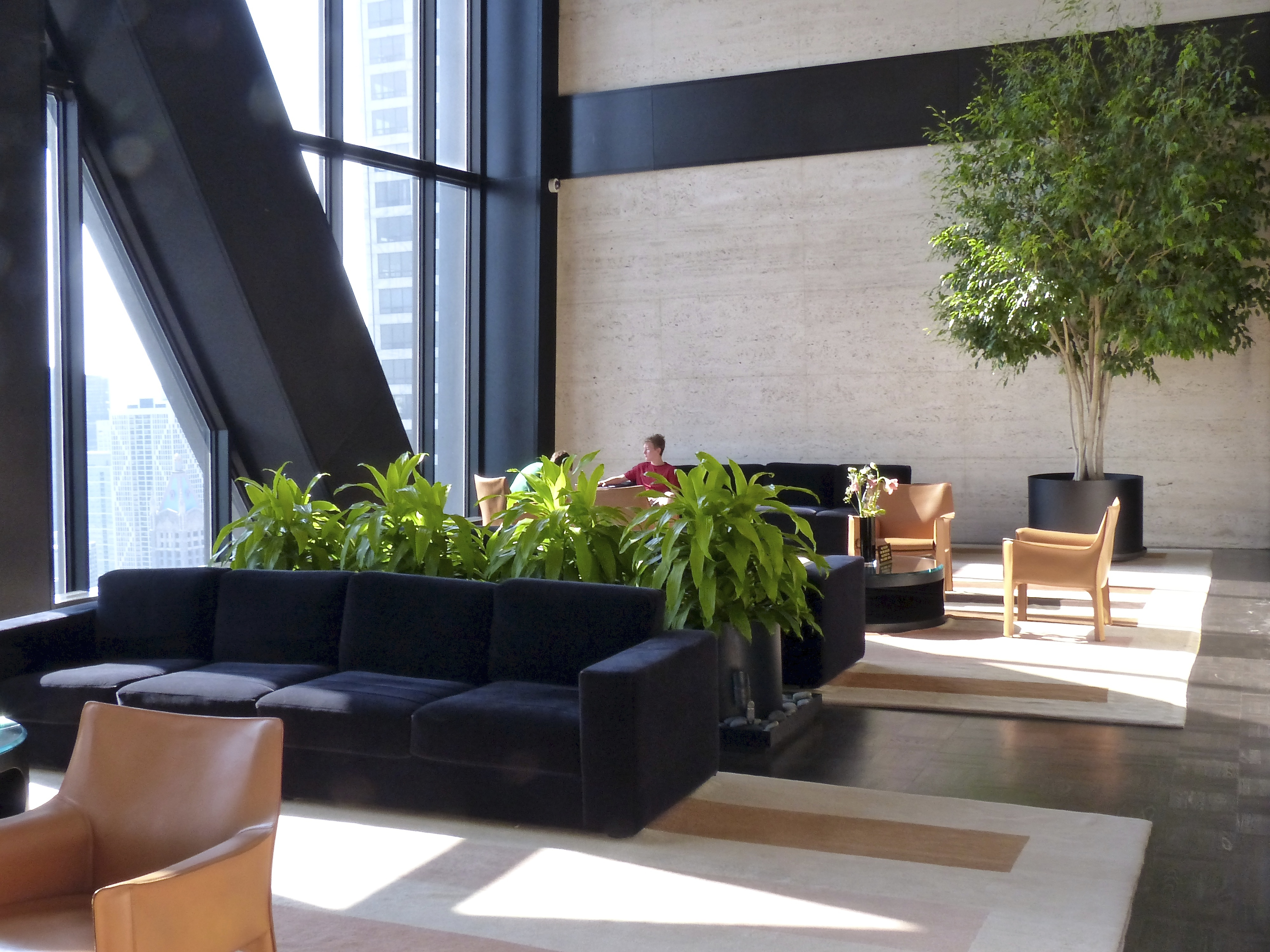
The 44th floor sky lobby of 875 North Michigan Avenue in 2013

The John Hancock Center's sky lobby on the 44th floor serves only the residential portion of the building that occupies 48 floors (floors 45–92). Three express elevators run from the residential lobby on the ground floor to the 44th floor, with all three of the elevators stopping at one of the parking garage levels. At floor 44, residents transfer to two banks of three elevators. One bank serves floors 45–65 (21 floors in total) and the other serves floors 65–92 (28 floors).

The tower's 44th floor sky lobby includes a pool, gym, dry cleaner, convenience store, about 700 mailboxes, two party rooms, a sitting area overlooking Lake Michigan, a small library, a refuse room (with trash chutes emptying here), offices for the managers of the residential condominium, and a polling station for residents during elections.

Floors above 92 are serviced by direct passenger elevators from the ground floor, and by two freight elevators that serve floors 44–98 (55 floors).

== Buildings with sky lobbies ==
Building	Completed	City	Floors of sky lobby(s)
875 North Michigan Avenue	1969	Chicago, Illinois, United States	44
1 World Trade Center (1970–2001)	1972	New York, New York, United States	44, 78
2 World Trade Center (1971–2001)	1973	New York, New York, United States	44, 78
Willis Tower	1973	Chicago, Illinois, United States	33/34, 66/67
Tower 42	1980	London, United Kingdom	23/24
JPMorgan Chase Tower (Houston)	1982	Houston, Texas, United States	60
Wells Fargo Plaza (Houston)	1983	Houston, Texas, United States	34/35, 58/59
Williams Tower	1983	Houston, Texas, United States	51
Columbia Center	1985	Seattle, Washington, United States	40
Miami Tower	1987	Miami, Florida, United States	11
311 South Wacker Drive	1990	Chicago, Illinois, United States	46
Immigration Tower	1990	Hong Kong, China	38
Revenue Tower	1990	Hong Kong, China	38
Seattle Municipal Tower	1990	Seattle, Washington, United States	40
Central Plaza	1992	Hong Kong, China	46
Shin Kong Life Tower	1993	Taipei, Taiwan	16
UOB Plaza Tower One	1995	Singapore, Singapore	37–38
Wisma 46	1996	Jakarta, Indonesia	46
The Center	1998	Hong Kong, China	42
Petronas Twin Towers	1999	Kuala Lumpur, Malaysia	41/42
Izumi Garden Tower	2002	Tokyo, Japan	–
Two International Finance Centre	2003	Hong Kong, China	33, 35, 55, 56
Taipei 101	2004	Taipei, Taiwan	35/36, 59/60
Bloomberg Tower	2004	New York, New York, United States	6, 20
One Island East	2005	Hong Kong, China	36, 37
Nina Tower	2006	Hong Kong, China	41
The Bow	2007	Calgary, Alberta, Canada	18, 36, 58
First World Hotel	2008	Genting Highlands, Pahang, Malaysia	3, 8
Shanghai World Financial Center	2008	Shanghai, China	28/29, 52/53
200 West Street	2009	New York, New York, United States	11
Waldorf Astoria Las Vegas	2009	Las Vegas, Nevada, United States	23
Burj Khalifa	2010	Dubai, United Arab Emirates	43, 76, 123
International Commerce Centre	2010	Hong Kong, China	48/49, 88, 98/99
Abraj Al-Bait Clock Tower	2012	Makkah, Saudi Arabia	M2, (Note: Used as the hotel lobby) M4 (Note: Used as the serviced apartments lobby)
Lurie Children's Hospital	2012	Chicago, Illinois, United States	11
Tokyo Sky Tree	2012	Tokyo, Japan	4F, 350m
One World Trade Center (2014–)	2014	New York, New York, United States	64
Abeno Harukas	2014	Osaka, Japan	17/18, 19/20
Plaza Tunjungan 5	2015	Surabaya, Indonesia	20
Shanghai Tower	2015	Shanghai, China	22/23, 37/38, 52/53, 68/69, 101
Central Place Tower	2016	Arlington, Virginia, United States	6
Wilshire Grand Tower	2017	Los Angeles, California, United States	70
Lakhta Center	2018	Saint Petersburg, Russia	29/30, 53/54
Wuhan Greenland Center	2018	Wuhan, China	25/26, 49/50, 70, 116/117
30 Hudson Yards	2019	New York, New York, United States	35
Australia 108	2019	Melbourne, Australia	83, 84
Djamaa el Djazaïr	2019	Algiers, Algeria	4
Jeddah Tower	2020	Jeddah, Saudi Arabia	42/43, 75/76, 125/126
Merdeka 118	2021	Kuala Lumpur, Malaysia	40/41, 75/76
50 Hudson Yards	2022	New York, New York, United States	31/32

== See also ==
- List of buildings with 100 floors or more
