= Masterworks Advisers LLC =

American financial services company

- Company type: Privately held company
- Industry: Art market; Stockbroker; Electronic trading platform
- Founded: 2017; 9 years ago
- Founders: Scott Lynn
- Headquarters: Brookfield Place, New York City, U.S.
- Area served: United States + 100 other countries
- Key people: Scott Lynn (CEO) Allen Sukholitsky (CIO); Nigel Glenday (CFO); Josh Goldstein (General council); Hai Tran (CPO) Jennifer Moxon (CCO)
- AUM: ▲US$900 million (2023)
- Members: 800,000 (2023)
- Number of employees: ~200 (2024)
- Website: Official website

Masterworks Advisers LLC is an American financial services company that specializes in the art investment market. The company buys pieces of art and files them to the SEC as a public offering. The company then sells shares of the art on their website for varying costs. As of April 2024, Masterworks has over 800,000 members and over $900 million in assets under management. The company has sold artworks by Banksy, George Condo, Cecily Brown, Simone Leigh, Claude Monet, and Andy Warhol.

== History ==
Masterworks was founded in 2017 by Scott Lynn to make the art market more accessible to investors. However, the company has since strayed from this business model and has begun to prioritize wealthy clients.

In 2021, Masterworks raised $110 million in Series A funding, led by Left Lane Capital. The backing valued the company at more than $1 billion. By February 2022, the company had bought more than 100 paintings, worth nearly $450 million

In June 2023, it was reported that only 5% of the site's registered users had actually made an investment. The company is also known for its large marketing push, as the company nearly doubled its marketing from $5 million to $9 million. Several employees have also reported "unethical" tactics to get better ad placements on websites.
