= Undertone (advertising company) =

American digital advertising company

- Type: Private
- Industry: Online advertising, Internet services
- Founded: 2002
- Founders: Michael Cassidy, Eric Franchi
- Headquarters: New York City, United States
- Key people: Doron Gerstel CEO of Perion, Dan Aks, President of Undertone
- Parent: Perion Network
- Website: www.undertone.com

Undertone is an American digital advertising company specializing in high-impact advertising formats, programmatic advertising, and cross-screen campaigns. Founded in 2002 as a subsidiary of digital media buying company Intercept Interactive, Undertone developed advertising technologies for desktop, mobile, and connected television (CTV).

== History ==
In 2008, Undertone raised $47 million from JMI Equity to buy up competing companies. It became an independent entity in 2012, after the launch of the proprietary high impact display units PageGrabber and PageSkin. At the time, Undertone's clients included AccuWeather and Britannica. Undertone creates advertising campaigns across all screens and platforms, including interactive connected TV (CTV). Undertone product includes "cookieless" targeting technology called "Smart Optimization of Responsive Traits" SORT and "Uplift Collective," a publisher portfolio of minority, LGBTQIA+ and women publishers aimed at advancing social issues.

In 2015 it became part of Perion Network, after an acquisition for $180 million cash. Since then, Undertone has become part of Perion's plan to become a global media industry holding company.

Undertone was described as one of the last independent ad serving platforms in 2009, but has since bought up several competing companies.

== Acquisitions ==
In 2008, Undertone raised $47 million from JMI Equity to acquire smaller competitors. In June 2014, Undertone signed an agreement to purchase Israeli digital media company Upfront Digital Media; it made the purchase in particular to benefit from Upfront's proprietary advertising platform. Upfront, which was founded in 2010 as Legolas Media, offered managed and self-serve consoles for programmatic buying of ads directly to publishers and through a number of supply and demand partners.

In June 2015, Undertone announced the acquisition of Sparkflow, an all-in-one platform for cross-screen rich media advertising. Sparkflow was founded in 2013 in Buenos Aires, Argentina by Sebastián Alberto Miret, Gabriel Sánchez Catena, and Rodrigo Oscar Vazquez.
