= Lantau Tomorrow Vision =

Proposed development project in Hong Kong

- Location: Hong Kong
- Status: Proposed
- Website: https://www.lantau.gov.hk/en/lantau-tomorrow-vision/

Lantau Tomorrow Vision
- Traditional Chinese: 明日大嶼願景
- Simplified Chinese: 明日大屿愿景
- Jyutping: ming4 jat6 daai6 jyu4 jyun6 ging2
Transcriptions
Standard Mandarin
- Hanyu Pinyin: Míngrì Dà yǔ Yuàn Jǐng
Yue: Cantonese
- Jyutping: ming4 jat6 daai6 jyu4 jyun6 ging2

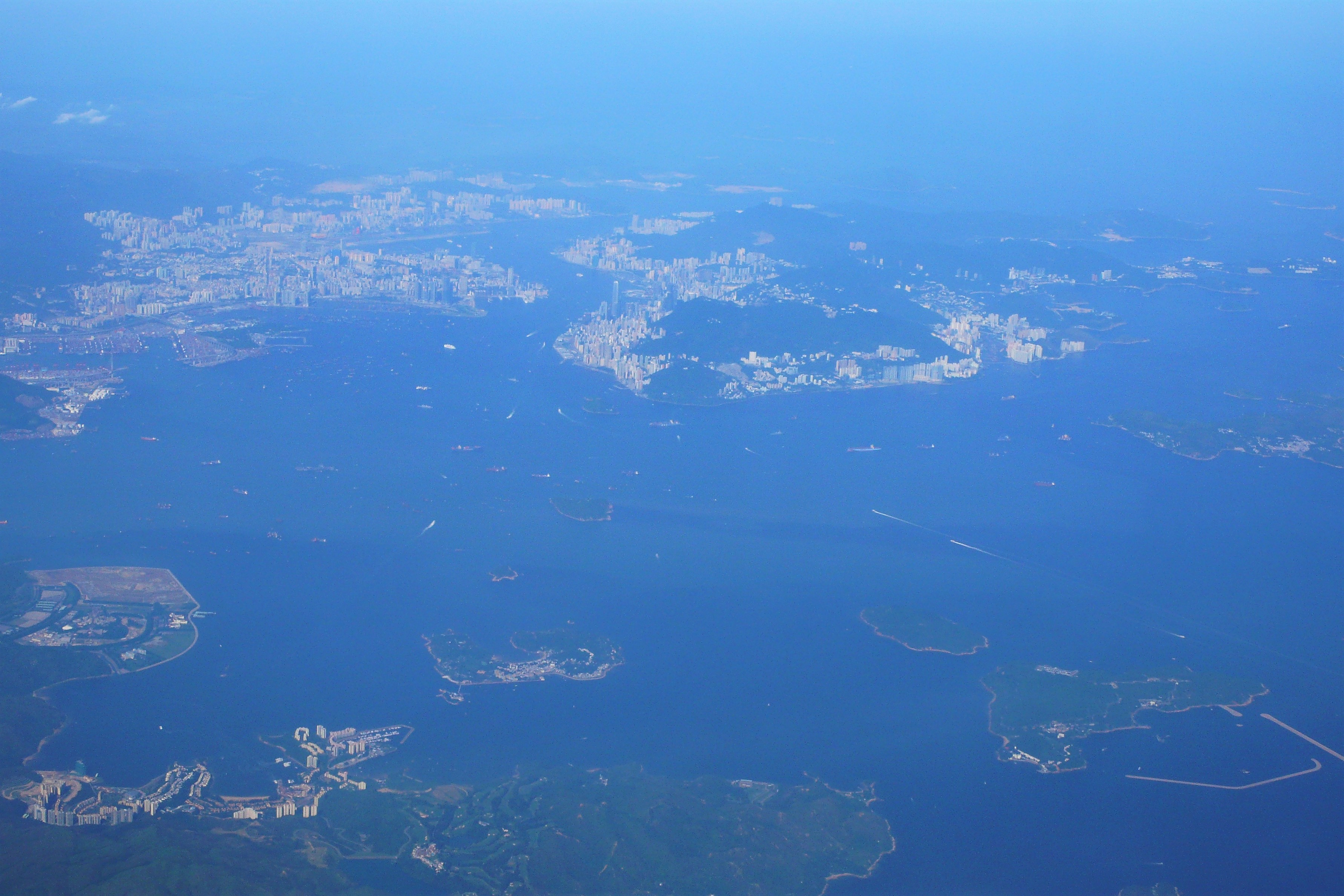
Lantau Tomorrow Vision suggests massive land reclamation near Kau Yi Chau and Hei Ling Chau on waters to the east of Lantau Island.

Lantau Tomorrow Vision (Chinese: 明日大嶼願景), also known as the Kau Yi Chau Artificial Islands, is a postponed development project in Hong Kong which proposes creating the city's third central business district (CBD) by constructing large artificial islands through massive land reclamation. These islands, with a proposed total area of about 1,700 hectares (4,200 acres), would be located near Kau Yi Chau and Hei Ling Chau of the eastern waters of Lantau Island.

The project was first suggested in 2014 by the city's chief executive, Leung Chun-ying, before being formally proposed in 2018 by his successor, Carrie Lam, in her second policy address. It has been met with controversy and opposition due to environmental concerns and also its high cost of an estimated HK$580 billion (US$73.8 billion), amounting to half of the city's fiscal reserves. In February 2024, the city's financial secretary said the project has been postponed after financial considerations, but insisted that it would not be cancelled. Secretary for Development Bernadette Linn stated in September 2025 that the current term government would not proceed with the project in its term, saying that it did not have the "necessary conditions" for it to be carried out and that the government had not yet "formulated a timetable" for the project.

== Background ==
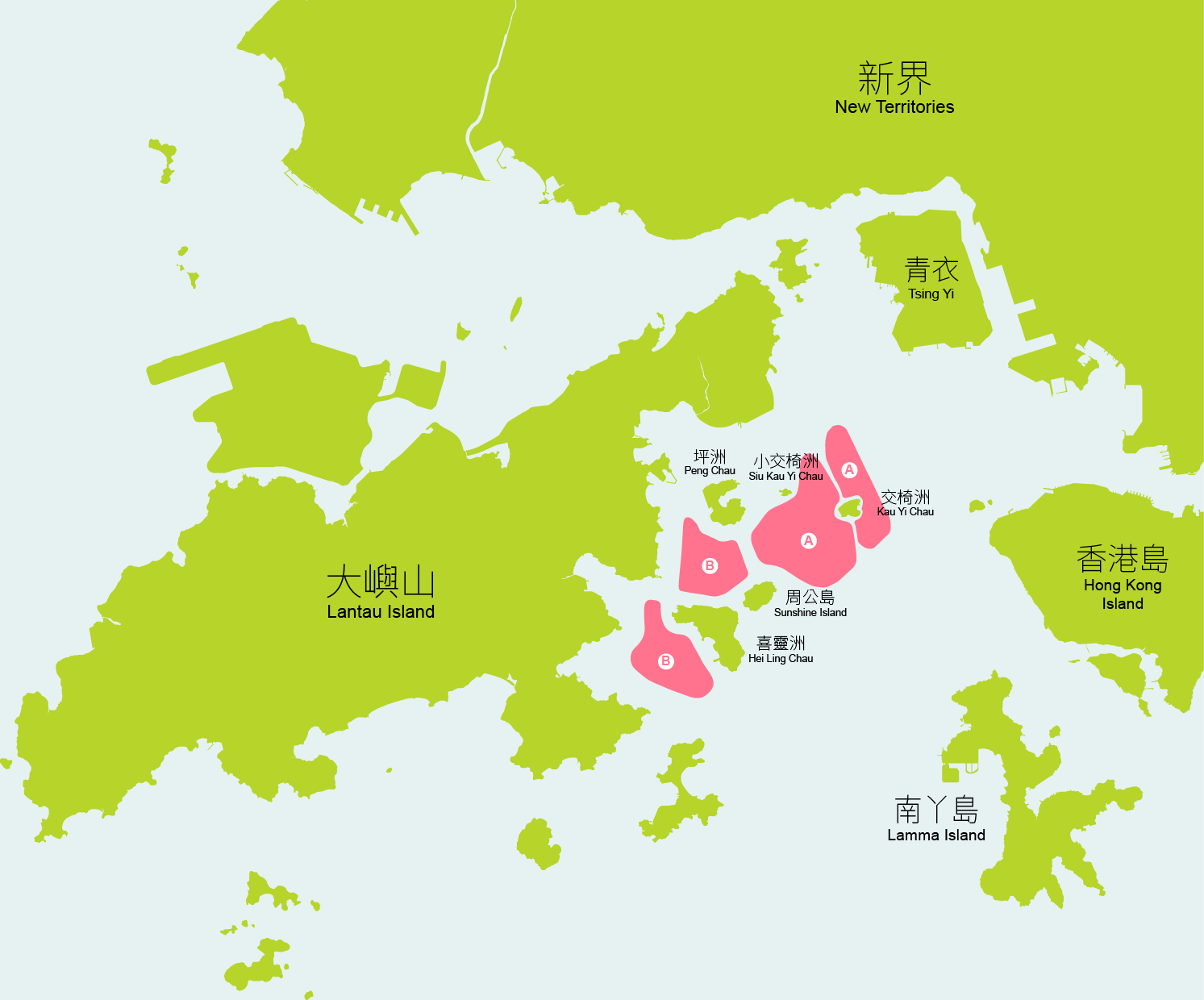
Land reclamation (red area) in Lantau Tomorrow Vision project.

In the Port and Airport Development Strategy of the late 1980s and the 1990s, reclamation in the area was intended for container terminals nos. 10 and 11. The idea of creating built-up land in the area via land reclamation was first publicly suggested in 2009 by two mainland academics, including Professor Lei Qiang from the Sun Yat Sen University in Guangzhou, China.

The idea of the massive reclamation in the eastern waters off Lantau Island was suggested by Chief Executive Leung Chun-ying's policy address in January 2014, where he proposed the strategic studies on artificial islands in central waters for the development of the East Lantau Metropolis (ELM) for long-term land supply.

In 2016, the government published the Hong Kong 2030 Plus project suggesting the development of an East Lantau Metropolis by reclamations in the waters near Kau Yi Chau and the Hei Ling Chau with a capacity of accommodating population of about 400,000 to 700,000 and creating employment of about 200,000. The Sustainable Lantau Blueprint of 2017 and the Task Force on Land Supply adopted the ELM project, in which the Task Force listed it as one of the 18 options in the five-month public consultation in 2018.

During the public consultation of the Task Force on Land Supply, the think tank led by former Chief Executive Tung Chee-hwa, Our Hong Kong Foundation, proposed a research report on 7 August 2018 titled "Re-imagining Hong Kong with a Game-Changer: Enhanced East Lantau Metropolis" of reclaiming 2,200 hectares in the eastern waters off Lantau in 14 years of time which would house 1.1 million people that would solve Hong Kong's land shortage problems. It came after Chief Executive Carrie Lam signaled her support for land reclamation when she said he was confident "that reclamation outside Victoria Harbour is the way to go, adding that she hopes the task force will also come to that conclusion."

== Content ==
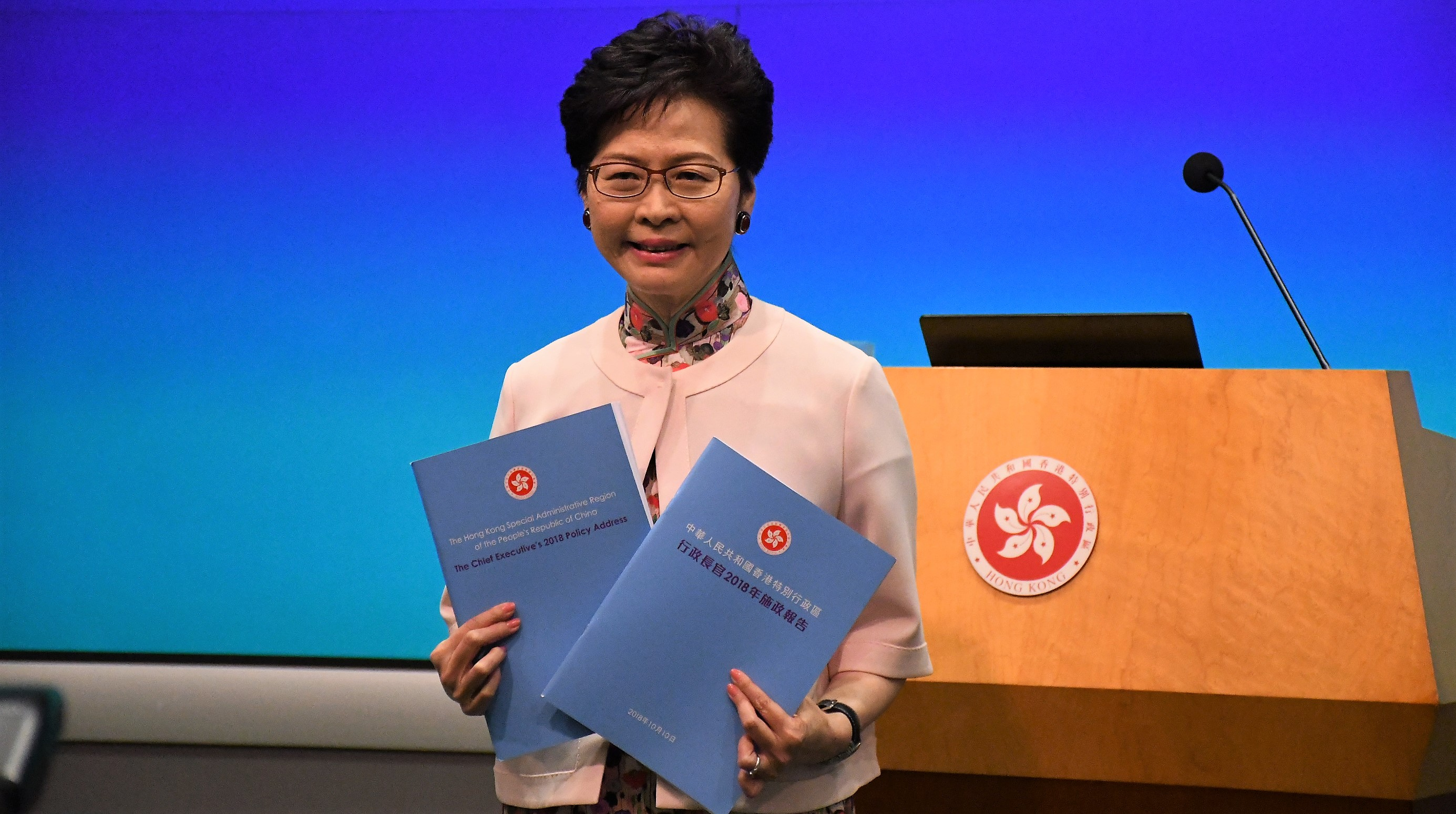
Carrie Lam proposed Lantau Tomorrow Vision in her second policy address in October 2018.

On 10 October 2018, Carrie Lam's second policy address laid out the "Lantau Tomorrow Vision" which included the 1,700-hectare reclamation project which would provide between 260,000 and 400,000 homes to 700,000 to 1.1 million people, of which 70 per cent of the homes would be public housing. The reclamation project would create artificial islands near Kau Yi Chau and Hei Ling Chau of the waters of East Lantau.

The reclamation would be consisting of the construction of artificial islands In the pamphlet, the project also suggested expanding the infrastructure capacity to support Lantau's role as a "double gateway" to the world and Yuegang'ao Greater Bay Area, including road and rail connecting the artificial islands and Hong Kong Island and Sunny Bay.

The project, almost double the size of its original proposal, would be the largest and most expensive to date, with a predicted cost of between HK$400 billion and HK$500 billion (US$64 billion). The project also suggested setting up a $1 billion Lantau Conservation Fund to promote and carry out conservation projects on Lantau.

In December 2022, the cost was revised upwards of 16% from HK$500 billion to HK$580 billion (US$75 billion), with the projected revenue from land sales decreasing from HK$925 billion to HK$750 billion. Secretary for Development Bernadette Linn defended the higher cost projection, and said further research was needed to get a better cost estimate. In January 2023, Linn said that they also could not give accurate figures on the expected revenue from land sales, and that it would take until 2025 to ask for funding with a more accurate estimate of costs. Linn also said she hoped 30,000 homes would be ready in 2033.

== Concerns ==
The Lantau Tomorrow Vision met fierce opposition immediately after its publication. Roy Tam Hoi-pong of the environmental group Green Sense expressed his worry that the project would drain the city's coffers, estimating it could cost up to HK$1 trillion (US$128.2 billion), almost all of Hong Kong's fiscal reserves. Former Hong Kong Observatory director Lam Chiu Ying warned that the reclaimed area would be vulnerable to rising sea levels and extreme weather due to climate change.

Carrie Lam's announcement of the project was also criticised for pre-empting a report from the Task Force on Land Supply, which carried out five months of public consultations and was supposed to advise the government on the best ways to deal with the land shortage, as the project only came barely two weeks after the public consultations and before the publication of its final report.

It was also accused of being a gift to private businesses to enable them to make gigantic profits, as a similar proposal by Tung Chee-hwa's Our Hong Kong Foundation is endorsed by property developers such as New World, Henderson, Hang Lung, Sino Group, Shui On, Shimao, Shun Tak, Fung Group, Lan Kwai Fong Group, as well as influential government officials such as Arthur Li, Elsie Leung, and Bernard Chan.

Authorities began a 3-month public consultation on 29 December 2022, but did not make an announcement; instead, media discovered that the public consultation had started. In February 2023, the government hosted a closed-door "briefing" over the project; 11 environmental groups refused to attend, saying the government's consultation period was "the sneakiest in history" due to it not being announced.

In February 2023, after a report by Greenpeace and Liber Research Community listed risks with the project, the Development Bureau said "We call on them not to obstruct Hong Kong’s development with alarmist and fallacious remarks."

In March 2023, the government announced that the Belcher Bay Promenade, opened in phases starting from 2019, could be closed for five years in order to build a road to the project.

In March 2023, Regina Ip said that the Northern Metropolis project should be prioritised over Lantau Tomorrow Vision; John Lee then responded by saying both projects would move ahead simultaneously without the need to prioritise one over the other. In April 2023, a survey showed that only 6% of Hongkongers supported Lee's idea to build both simultaneously.

In April 2023, Greenpeace said that the government had misled citizens on its "public consultation," as only 1 of 33 briefing sessions by the government had participation from the public.

In August 2023, experts warned that the government would be unlikely to generate its projected income of HK$85 billion from land sales.

An editorial in The Standard newspaper in December 2023 suggested the government might have lost interest in the project.

== See also ==
- Airport Core Programme
- Land reclamation in Hong Kong
