= Lands Administration Office =

- 地政處
- Emblem of Hong Kong

Department overview
- Formed: 11 April 1986
- Jurisdiction: Government of Hong Kong
- Headquarters: 20/F, North Point Government Offices, 333 Java Road, North Point, Hong Kong
- Motto: Land administration in Hong Kong for the greater benefit of the community
- Deputy Ministers responsible: Ms. Lily CHIU Lee Lee, Deputy Director (General)^{PGLA} (Note: Directorate grade 3 (D3)); Miss Sapphire LO Pui Yiu, Deputy Director (Specialist)^{PGLA} (Note: Directorate grade 3 (D3))
- Department executive: Mr. Ronald CHAN Wing Yiu, Senior Principal Land Executive (Note: Directorate grade 1 (D1))
- Parent department: Lands Department
- Key document: Hong Kong Ordinances
- Website: landsd.gov.hk

Map
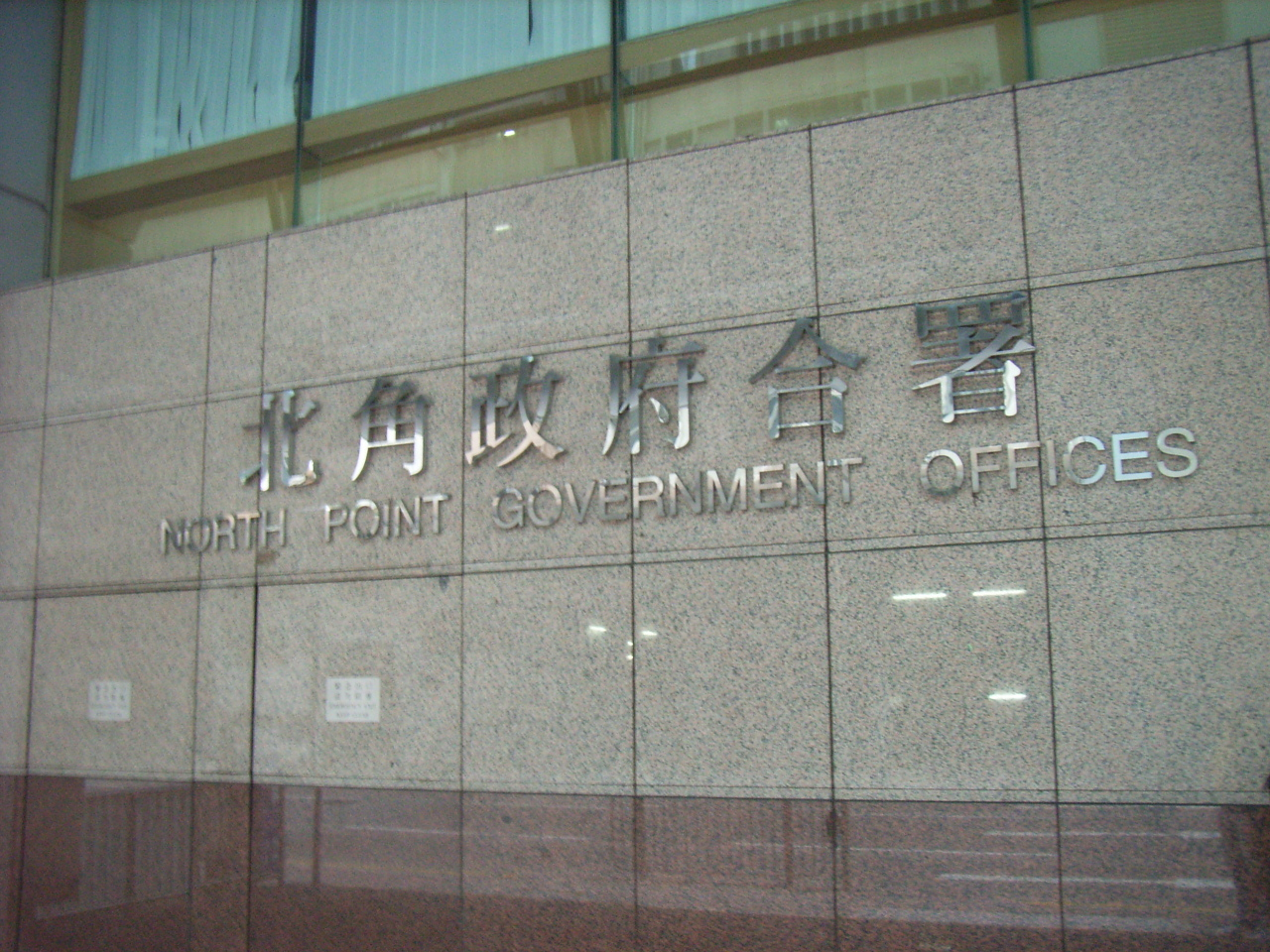
- Headquarters location of the LAO

Footnotes
- PGLA: Principal Government Land Agent

The Lands Administration Office (LAO) (Chinese: 地政處) is a functional office under the Lands Department of the Hong Kong Government. The LAO comprises a headquarters section, a number of professional sections and 12 District Lands Offices (DLOs). Established in April 1986, the Lands Administration Office is responsible for land grants, valuations, land resumption, property management, lease renewals and amendments, slope maintenance, lease enforcement, land control and management, squatter control, etc. The LAO is headed by two principal government land agents (PGLAs), who are civil servants at directorate level 3 (D3): deputy director (general) and deputy director (specialist).

== Grade and structure ==
Estate Surveyor (ES) Grade
Rank in English	Rank in Chinese	Level
Estate Surveyor (ES)	產業測量師	Master Pay Scale Point 30 to 44
Senior Estate Surveyor (SES)	高級產業測量師	Master Pay Scale Point 45 to 49
Chief Estate Surveyor (CES)	總產業測量師	Directorate Pay Scale Point 1 (D1)
Government Land Agent (GLA)	政府地政監督	Directorate Pay Scale Point 2 (D2)
Principal Government Land Agent (PGLA)	首席政府地政監督	Directorate Pay Scale Point 3 (D3)

Geotechnical Engineer (GE) Grade
Rank in English	Rank in Chinese	Level
Geotechnical Engineer (GE)	土力工程師	Master Pay Scale Point 32 to 44
Senior Geotechnical Engineer (SGE)	高級土力工程師	Master Pay Scale Point 45 to 49
Chief Geotechnical Engineer (CGE)	總土力工程師	Directorate Pay Scale Point 1 (D1)

Land Executive (LE) Grade
Rank in English	Rank in Chinese	Level
Land Executive (LE)	地政主任	Master Pay Scale Point 13 to 33
Senior Land Executive (SLE)	高級地政主任	Master Pay Scale Point 34 to 39
Chief Land Executive (CLE)	總地政主任	Master Pay Scale Point 40 to 44
Principal Land Executive (PLE)	首席地政主任	Master Pay Scale Point 45 to 49
Senior Principal Land Executive (SPLE)	高級首席地政主任	Directorate Pay Scale Point 1 (D1)

Survey Officer (Estate) Grade
Rank in English	Rank in Chinese	Level
Survey Officer (Estate)	測量主任(產業)	Master Pay Scale Point 9 to 22
Senior Survey Officer (Estate)	高級測量主任(產業)	Master Pay Scale Point 23 to 29
Principal Survey Officer (Estate)	首席測量主任(產業)	Master Pay Scale Point 30 to 37
Chief Survey Officer (Estate)	總測量主任(產業)	Master Pay Scale Point 38 to 41

Land Inspector (LI) Grade
Rank in English	Rank in Chinese	Level
Land Inspector II	二級地政督察	Master Pay Scale Point 4 to 16
Land Inspector I	一級地政督察	Master Pay Scale Point 17 to 22

== Organization ==
Lands Department
Lands Administration Office
Deputy Director (General)	Deputy Director (Specialist)
Principal Government Land Agent	Principal Government Land Agent
Assistant Director (Regional 1)	Assistant Director (Regional 2)	Assistant Director (Regional 3)	Assistant Director (Headquarters)	Assistant Director (Specialist 1)	Assistant Director (Specialist 2)	Assistant Director (Specialist 3)
Government Land Agent	Government Land Agent	Government Land Agent	Government Land Agent	Government Land Agent	Government Land Agent	Government Land Agent
District Lands Officer; Chief Estate Surveyor	District Lands Officer; Chief Estate Surveyor	District Lands Officer; Chief Estate Surveyor	Chief Estate Surveyor	Senior Principal Land Executive	Chief Estate Surveyor	Chief Estate Surveyor	Chief Estate Surveyor
District Lands Office; Hong Kong East	District Lands Office; Kowloon East	District Lands Office; North	Headquarters Section	Headquarters Section	Valuation Section	Estate Management Section (Management Unit)	Acquisition Section
District Lands Office; Hong Kong West and South	District Lands Office; Kowloon West	District Lands Office; Yuen Long	Land Supply Section	Railway Development Section	Development Control Section	Urban Renewal Section
District Lands Office; Sai Kung	District Lands Office; Tsuen Wan and Kwai Tsing	District Lands Office; Tuen Mun	Estate Management Section (Estate Unit)	Slope Maintenance Section; Chief Geotechnical Engineer	New Development Area Section
District Lands Office; Islands	District Lands Office; Sha Tin	Training Section; Senior Estate Surveyor	Administration Unit; Chief Executive Officer
District Lands Office; Tai Po	Special Duties Task Force; Principal Land Executive; Senior Forestry Officer	Village Improvement and Special Duties Section; Principal Land Executive

== See also ==
- Land Registry
- Buildings Department
- Civil Engineering and Development Department
- Town Planning Board
- Urban Renewal Authority
