= Chan Nai-keong =

Hong Kong engineer and government official

Kenneth "Nicky" Chan Nai-keong, CBE, JP (Chinese: 陳乃強; 17 November 1931 – 9 May 2003) was a Hong Kong engineer and government official. He was the first Chinese person to become Secretary for Lands and Works from 1983 to 1986.

== Biography ==
With a family root in Zhongshan, Guangdong, Chan was born in 1931. He was educated at Loughborough College and became a student engineer at the Public Works Department of the Hong Kong government. His first task was road-widening work in Wong Nai Chung Road outside the Hong Kong Jockey Club in Happy Valley. One of this major projects was the construction of the Connaught Road pedestrian underpass to the Star Ferry Terminal in Central. He was promoted to the assistant engineer in 1960 and was sent to Yale University for advanced graduate studies in traffic engineering. He became senior engineer in 1962, the chief engineer in 1965 and later the government's chief engineer in 1973.

In 1977, he was promoted to the project manager of the Tuen Mun New Town Development Office, head of the Highways Office and director of engineering development. He then became the Deputy Director of the Lands and Works. He was the first Chinese to become Secretary for Lands and Works from 1983 to 1986 before he became the Postmaster General. For his contribution, he was awarded an honorary doctorate by Loughborough and was elected to the British Fellowship of Engineering in 1986. He retired from the civil service in 1987 to take the position of managing director of Hong Kong Electric Holdings which sparked controversy of a potential conflict of interest.

After his retirement, he was active in the public sphere, becoming the founding president of the Hong Kong Former Senior Civil Servants Association, chairman of the Hong Kong Institution of Engineers and president of the Association of Engineers in Society. He was appointed member of the Preparatory Committee for the Hong Kong Special Administrative Region and Hong Kong Affairs Advisor on the eve of the handover. He was also a member of the Selection Committee and a member of the Election Committee. In 1997, Chan formed the Hong Kong Experts Consultancy which employed former senior civil servants to offer advice to engineering and property businesses.

Chan died of cancer in 2003 and was survived by his wife and three children.

Government offices
Preceded by David Wylie McDonald	Secretary for Lands and Works; 1983–1986	Succeeded by Graham Barnes
