= Electrical and Mechanical Services Department =

Hong Kong government department

- 機電工程署

Department overview
- Formed: 1948; 78 years ago (as Electrical and Mechanical Office); 1982; 44 years ago (as Electrical and Mechanical Services Department)
- Preceding agencies: Electrical Office; Mechanical Office; Transport Office
- Jurisdiction: Hong Kong
- Headquarters: 3 Kai Shing Street, Kowloon Bay, Kowloon, Hong Kong; 22.326387°N 114.203949°E
- Employees: 5,566 (March 2019)
- Annual budget: HK$1,518.4m (2020-2021)
- Minister responsible: Michael Wong Wai-lun, Secretary for Development
- Deputy Minister responsible: Liu Chun-san, Under Secretary for Development
- Department executive: Eric Pang Yiu-hung, Director of Electrical and Mechanical Services
- Parent department: Development Bureau
- Website: www.emsd.gov.hk

Electrical and Mechanical Services Department
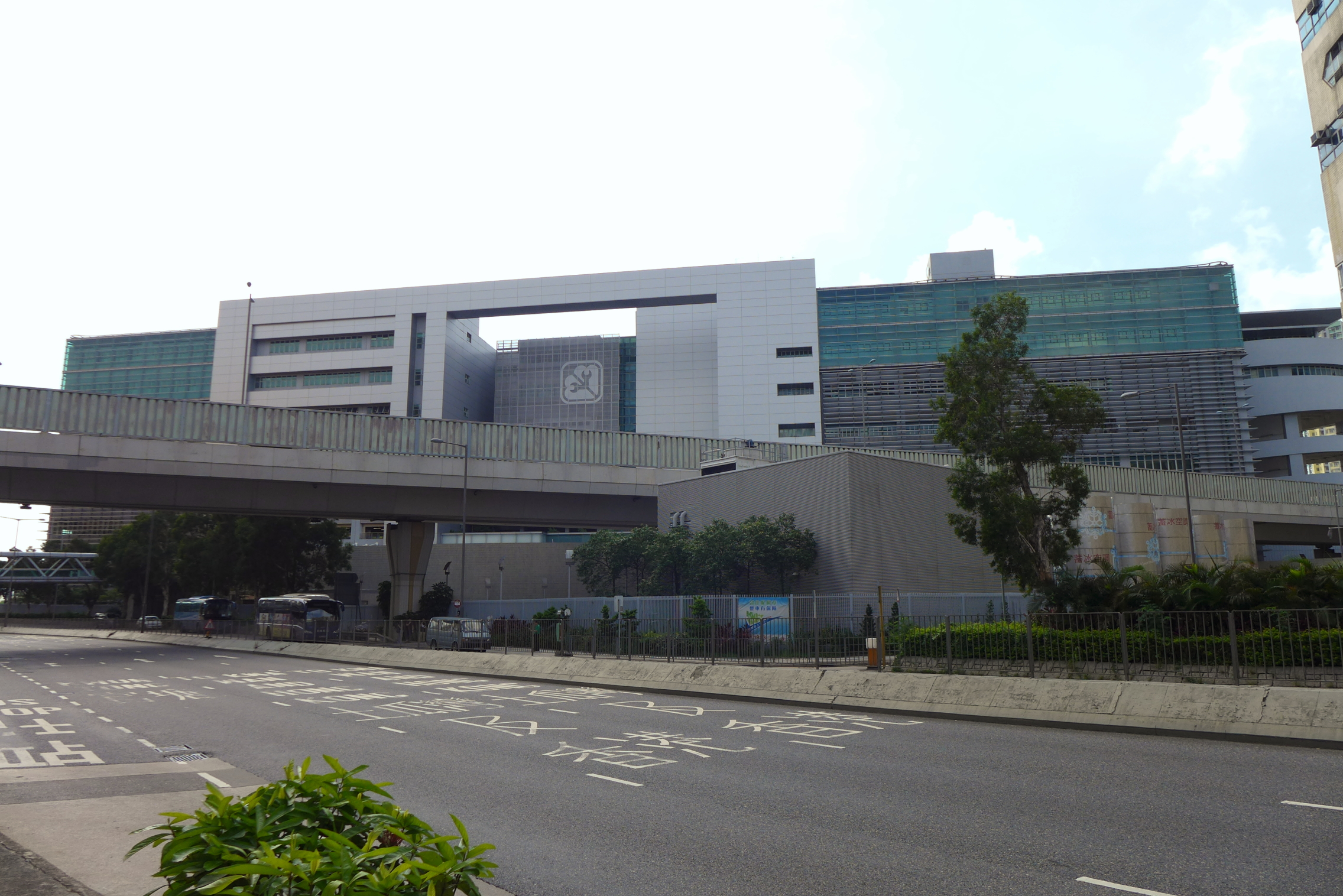
- Head office
- Traditional Chinese: 機電工程署
- Simplified Chinese: 机电工程署
Transcriptions
Standard Mandarin
- Hanyu Pinyin: Jīdiàn Gōngchéng Shǔ
Yue: Cantonese
- Jyutping: gei1 din6 gung1 cing4 cyu5

The Electrical and Mechanical Services Department (EMSD; Chinese: 機電工程署) is a Hong Kong government department responsible for inspection and enforcement of operation and safety of many electricity and gas installations; railways and trams; lifts and escalators; amusement rides; working platforms on building sites, and many other diverse areas. The department has two main branches: Regulatory Services and Trading Services. The department falls under the purview of the Development Bureau. The incumbent Director of Electrical and Mechanical Services is Pang Yiu-hung. The two deputy directors are H. C. Lai and T. H. Tai.

== Regulatory Services ==
- Railways Branch: In February 2008, the department absorbed and expanded the small Hong Kong Railway Inspectorate (HKRI) from the Transport and Housing Bureau (THB), renaming it the Railways Branch. The Railways Branch has regulatory responsibility for the railway lines operated by the MTR Corporation and the automated people mover operated by the Airport Authority in the terminal building of the Hong Kong International Airport, as well as (since the move from THB) Hong Kong Tramways and the Peak Tram. The former HKRI had been responsible for the railway lines operated by the then Kowloon–Canton Railway Corporation. Its main functions are investigation of railway incidents, oversight of railway safety, assessment and approval of new railways and major modifications, and assessment and follow-up of improvement measures by railway operators. The unit consists of 14 professional and support staff.
- Electricity and Energy Efficiency Branch
- Gas & General Legislation Branch

== Trading Services ==
There are three branches under the Trading Services and each branch is led by an assistant director.

- Engineering Services Branch 1
- Engineering Branch 2
  - General Engineering Services Division
  - Municipal Sector Division
  - Health Sector Division
- Corporate Support and Business Development Branch

== Innovation and Development ==
In 2018, EMSD up an Interactive Learning Center in 4/F, EMSD HQ. The learning center has introduced the latest VR (Virtual reality) Learning systems for Electrical and Mechanical industry including the first LED Immersive CAVE in Hong Kong by combining the technologies of immersive VR and BIM (Building information modeling) and the VR training system for Kai Tak Cruise Terminal Passenger Boarding Bridges.

== See also ==
- Government departments and agencies in Hong Kong
