= Kau Yi Chau =

Uninhabited island in Hong Kong

Coordinates: 22°17′3″N 114°4′36″E

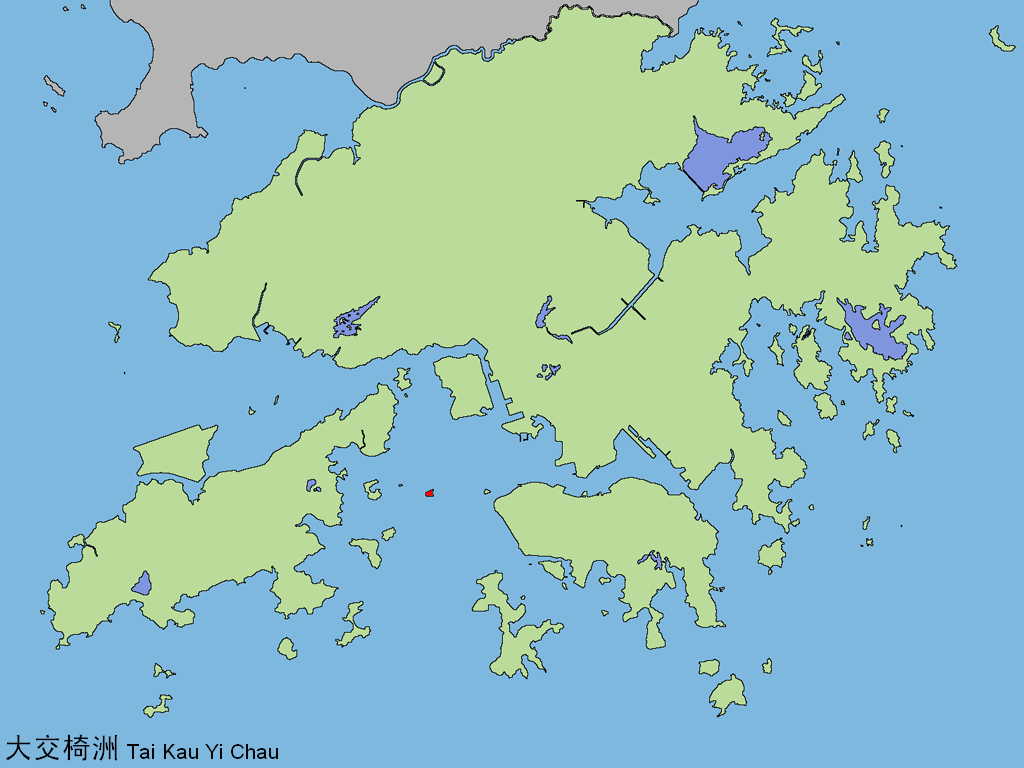
- Map showing the location of Kau Yi Chau in Hong Kong
- Interactive map of Kau Yi Chau

Geography
- Location: Between Hong Kong Island and Lantau Island
- Highest elevation: 120 m (390 ft)

Administration
- Hong Kong
- Districts: Islands District

Kau Yi Chau
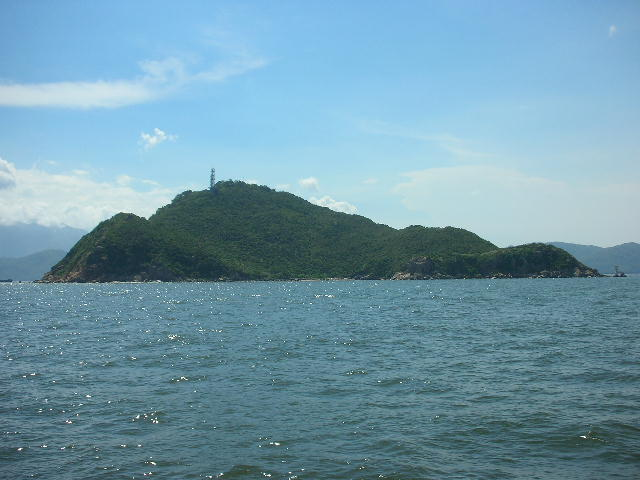
- Chinese: 交椅洲
- Literal meaning: "chair island"
Transcriptions
Standard Mandarin
- Hanyu Pinyin: Jiāoyǐzhōu
Yue: Cantonese
- Yale Romanization: Gāau yí jāu
- Jyutping: Gaau^{1} ji^{2} zau^{1}

Tai Kau Yi Chau
- Chinese: 大交椅洲
Transcriptions
Standard Mandarin
- Hanyu Pinyin: Dàjiāoyǐzhōu
Yue: Cantonese
- Yale Romanization: Daaih gāau yí jāu
- Jyutping: Daai^{6} gaau^{1} ji^{2} zau^{1}

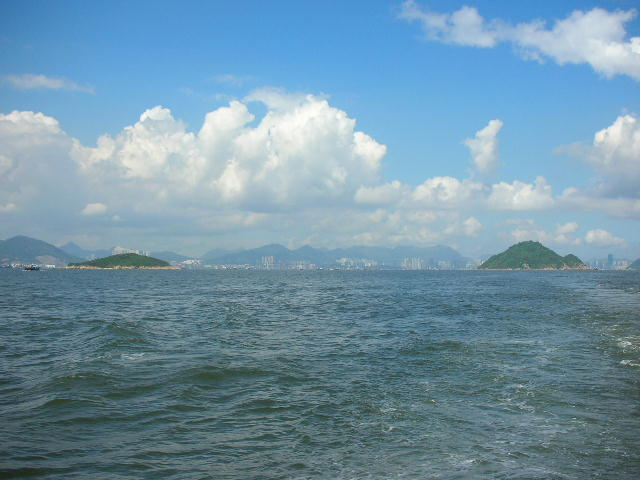
Kau Yi Chau (left) and Green Island (right)

Kau Yi Chau (formerly Kau I Island or Kau-i-chau), also known as Tai Kau Yi Chau, is an uninhabited island located west of Victoria Harbour, between Peng Chau and Green Island in Hong Kong. It is located on the crossroad of sea routes, east to west and north to south. The ferry between Central (Hong Kong Island) and Mui Wo (Lantau Island) sails close to the south of the island. Administratively it is part of Islands District.

== Location ==
The island is isolated from other islands. To its east are Green Island, Little Green Island and Hong Kong Island. To its west are Siu Kau Yi Chau, Peng Chau. To its southwest are Sunshine Island and Hei Ling Chau. To its northwest is Lantau Island.

== Geography ==
The island is no higher than 120 m (394 ft). A radar station is situated south of its peak. Wave measurement monitors the wave surrounding since 1994. The island south is largely cliff and island is uninhabited. Other than the radar station, the island left Qing tombs, woods and rocks. Chun Hoi Shek (鎮海石) is a major spot on the island. As uninhabited, no regular transport was set up for the island.

== Name ==
Kau Yi (交椅) means chair in the Cantonese language for the island's shape. It is also known as Tai Kau Yi (大交椅) as it is a larger chair compared to Siu Kau Yi (小交椅), a smaller chair, on its west.

== History ==
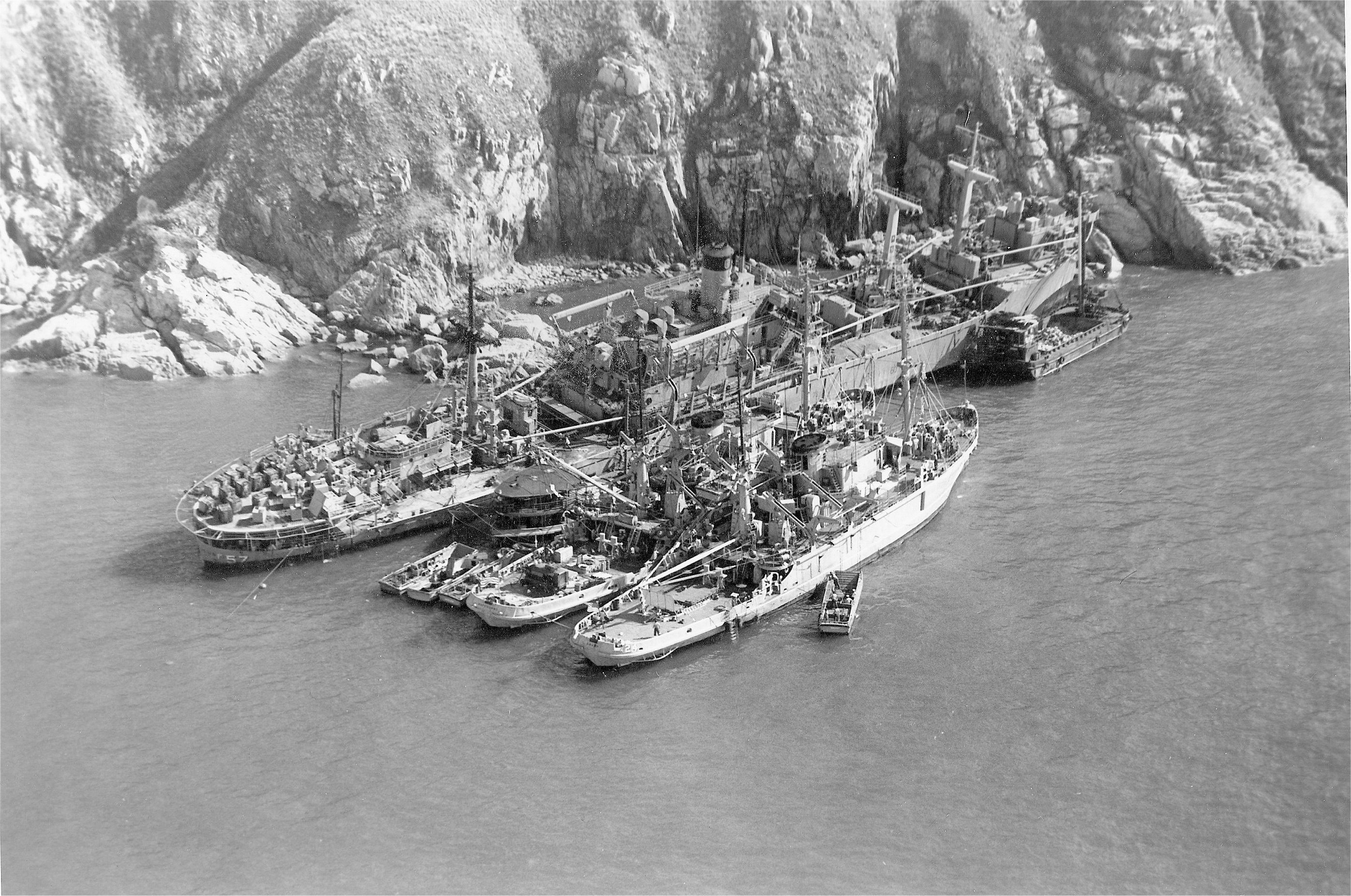
USS Regulus (AF-57) grounded on Kau Yi Chau in 1971.

In 1971, the United States Navy ship USS Regulus (AF-57) riding out typhoon Rose grounded on Kau Yi Chau. After three weeks of attempting to refloat Regulus, it was finally decided that the damage she had incurred was too severe to warrant salvage.

The island was part of the blueprint of Port and Airport Development Strategy. A container port was drawn between the proposed reclamation between Lantau Island and Kau Yi Chau. A proposed cross harbour tunnel connects the reclamation and another proposed reclamation of Green Island. The plan was not realised as a result of prolonged disagreement between the governments of Britain and the PRC.

== East Lantau Metropolis ==
The Hong Kong Government has proposed to build the East Lantau Metropolis by reclaiming land around the island《Enhancing Land Supply Strategy - Reclamation outside Victoria Harbour and Rock Cavern Development》in 2012 in an effort to increase land supply. It is projected to be the 3rd CBD of Hong Kong and have a population of 700 thousand people.
