= Northern Metropolis =

New development scheme in Hong Kong

The Northern Metropolis (Chinese: 北部都會區) is a planning area in Hong Kong, located in northern New Territories as part of North and Yuen Long Districts. It is envisioned as an integrated living and economic region, focused on integrating Hong Kong more closely with the Guangdong–Hong Kong–Macau Greater Bay Area, particularly with Shenzhen.

The centrepiece of the new development is planned to be the San Tin Technopole, an innovation and technology centre which will include the Hong Kong–Shenzhen Innovation & Technology Park (HSITP) located on the Lok Ma Chau Loop; and an innovation and technology park in San Tin.

== History ==
In the 2021 Policy Address, Chief Executive Carrie Lam first proposed the Northern Metropolis, with 300 km2 of economic and housing development across Yuen Long and North District.

In March 2023, Regina Ip said that the Northern Metropolis project should be prioritized over Lantau Tomorrow Vision; John Lee then responded by saying both projects would move ahead simultaneously without the need to prioritize one over the other. In April 2023, a survey showed that only 6% of Hongkongers supported Lee's idea to build both simultaneously.

In July 2024, it was revealed that 80% of submissions from the public opposed the plan to build the Technopole (San Tin) due to construction on wetlands.

In 2025, Financial Secretary Paul Chan Mo-po said the Northern Metropolis should refer to Xiong'an New Area for planning, construction and attracting industrial investment.

== Villagers ==
In August 2023, Hong Kong Secretary of Technology and Innovation Sun Dong said that he had "suffered a lot of pressure" from New Territories rural leader Kenneth Lau, over Lau's insistence to integrate villages into the San Tin Technopole plan.

In August 2024, a 29-year-old villager filed a lawsuit against the government's plans to reclaim some villager land for the project, saying that the land was protected under the small house policy.

== See also ==
- New towns of Hong Kong
- Lantau Tomorrow Vision
- North East New Territories New Development Areas Planning
- Guangdong–Hong Kong–Macau Greater Bay Area
