= Department of Railways (disambiguation) =

Department of Railways may refer to:

- New Zealand Railways Department
- Department of Railways New South Wales
- Department of Railways (1858–71), Victoria, Australia
- Nepal Department of Railways
- Railways Department (Hong Kong)
