= Thomas Luff Perkins =

British architect, engineer and colonial administrator

Thomas Luff Perkins, CMG (21 September 1867 – 2 December 1940) was a British architect, engineer and colonial administrator from Bristol. He was the Director of Public Works of Hong Kong from 1921 to 1923.

He became an architect in 1904. He was a Member of the Institution of Civil Engineers (MICE) and the Royal Institute of British Architects (RIBA). When he was the Director of Public Works from 1921 to 1923, the Public Works Department built the Yau Ma Tei Police Station in 1922, the Cenotaph and Western Fire Station in 1923.

He received the Companionship of the Order of St Michael and St George (CMG) in 1924. Perkins Road in Jardine's Lookout, Hong Kong Island is named after him.

Government offices
Preceded by William Chatham	Director of Public Works of Hong Kong; 1921–1923	Succeeded by Harold Thomas Creasy
