= David Wylie McDonald =

Scottish architect and colonial civil servant

David Wylie McDonald, CMG (9 October 1927 – 8 March 2007) was a Scottish architect and a colonial civil servant. He was the Director of Public Works in Hong Kong and the first Secretary for Lands and Works.

== Biography ==
Born on 9 October 1927 in Armadale, West Lothian, he was educated at Harris Academy, Dundee and volunteered for the Black Watch at the age of 17 in late 1944. One of his first postings was to guard the Princess Elizabeth at Balmoral where he served as a dancing partner and also part of the King's Guard in Inverness and Edinburgh. He took his architecture degree at Dundee College of Art and obtained a trainee job with a local architectural firm and married Eliza (Betty) Roberts Steele on 3 July 1951.

He moved to Hong Kong in 1955 and joined the colonial government. He quickly learned Cantonese and was able to communicate with the locals. He became the Director of Public Works in 1974 and the first Secretary for Lands and Works in 1981 when the post was created by Governor Murray MacLehose. He was responsible for the construction of the new towns in the New Territories, the High Island Reservoir scheme to provide drinking water and pushed through the coastal highway link between Sha Tin and Tai Po, and the Aberdeen Tunnel linking Wong Chuk Hang and Happy Valley. He was also in charge of the HK$3.5 billion scheme to modernise and electrify the Kowloon-Canton Railway and construction of the 1,400-bed Prince of Wales Hospital. McDonald also streamlined the over-bureaucratic Public Works Department and set up a unit to eliminate bribery and corruption.

McDonald was also a coach of the Hong Kong's swimming team at the 1974 Commonwealth Games in Christchurch, New Zealand. He was also an active member and the chieftain of the St. Andrew's Society of Hong Kong.

After his retirement in 1983, McDonald returned to Dundee with his wife. In Dundee, he was on the board of the Edinburgh-based Margaret Blackwood Housing Association which provides a home for disabled people and their families. He later moved to Perth, Australia with his wife to be close to their two daughters. He died there on 8 March 2007, aged 79.

Government offices
Preceded by James Jeavons Robson	Director of Public Works; 1974–1981	Replaced by Secretary for Lands and Works
New title	Secretary for Lands and Works; 1981–1983	Succeeded by Chan Nai-keong
