= Railways Department =

Proposed Hong Kong government department

The Railways Department (Chinese: 鐵路署) is a proposed Hong Kong government department. The Railway Development Office of the Highways Department and the Railways Branch of the Electrical and Mechanical Services Department would be merged into the new department, which would be subordinate to the Transport and Housing Bureau.

The government proposed the new department in response to recent high-profile railway safety scandals in Hong Kong, such as the problems surrounding the construction of the enlarged Hung Hom station. The commission of inquiry formed to investigate the Hung Hom situation was critical of the Highways Department for failing to properly monitor the project.

The establishment of the department is planned for 2023.
