= Hong Kong Railway Inspectorate =

The Hong Kong Railway Inspectorate (HKRI) was formerly a small regulatory body within the Transport and Housing Bureau, responsible for overseeing the safe operation of railways in Hong Kong. In February 2008, it was absorbed into the Electrical and Mechanical Services Department as its Railways Branch, having always received substantial technical support, including most of its staff, from EMSD.

The HKRI oversaw the railway lines operated by the MTR Corporation and the automated people mover operated by the Airport Authority in the terminal building of the Hong Kong International Airport. It was earlier responsible for the railway lines operated by the former Kowloon-Canton Railway Corporation.

Its main functions were: (a) investigation of railway incidents (b) oversight of safety practices by the railway operators (c) assessment and approval of new railways and major modifications (d) assessment and follow up of improvement measures by railway operators.

The HKRI was established in 1990 and was attached to the then Transport Branch of the Government Secretariat which is now the Transport and Housing Bureau (THB). The HKRI consisted of (at its demise) nine staff out of which 7 were professional engineers.

== See also ==
- Transport in Hong Kong
- Future projects of the MTR
