= Development Bureau =

Policy bureau of the Hong Kong Government

- 發展局
- Emblem of the Hong Kong SAR

Agency overview
- Formed: 2007
- Headquarters: 18/F, West Wing, Central Government Offices, 2 Tim Mei Avenue, Tamar, Hong Kong
- Ministers responsible: Bernadette Linn, Secretary for Development; David Lam Chi-man, Under Secretary for Development
- Agency executives: Doris Ho, Permanent Secretary for Development (Planning and Lands); Lau Chun Kit, Ricky, Permanent Secretary for Development (Works)
- Parent agency: Financial Secretary
- Child agencies: Lands Department; Lands Registry; Planning Department; Architectural Services Department; Buildings Department; Civil Engineering and Development Department; Drainage Services Department; Water Supplies Department
- Website: www.devb.gov.hk/

Development Bureau
- Traditional Chinese: 發展局
- Simplified Chinese: 发展局
Transcriptions
Standard Mandarin
- Hanyu Pinyin: Fāzhǎnjú
Yue: Cantonese
- Yale Romanization: Faat jín guhk
- Jyutping: Faat^{3} zin^{2} guk^{6}

The Development Bureau (DEVB; Chinese: 發展局) is a policy bureau of the Government of Hong Kong responsible for urban planning and renewal, land administration, infrastructure development, building safety, landscape, greening & tree development, water supplies, flood prevention and heritage conservation.

The Bureau is supervised by the Secretary for Development.

== History ==
The Development Bureau of Hong Kong was created on 1 July 2007 as part of a governmental reorganisation introduced under Donald Tsang.

Responsibility for urban planning, environmental protection, and lands administration originally fell under the Planning, Environment and Lands Bureau when the Hong Kong SAR government was established in 1997.

Beginning 1 January 2000, the responsibility for environmental protection was transferred to the Environment and Food Bureau; the Planning, Environment and Lands Bureau was renamed Planning and Lands Bureau.

When the Principal Officials Accountability System went into effect on 1 July 2002, the Housing Bureau and Planning and Lands Bureau were combined into the Housing, Planning and Lands Bureau.

In 2007, the Development Bureau was established and took over the responsibility of planning and lands administration from the Housing, Planning and Lands Bureau, public works from the Environment, Transportation and Works Bureau, and heritage conservation from Home Affairs Bureau.

In July 2023, it was revealed that the Development Bureau was considering direct land grants, rather than open tenders, for the San Tin Technopole.

== Structure ==
The Bureau comprises ten divisions under two branches overseen by the respective Permanent Secretary:

=== Planning and Lands Branch ===
The Planning and Lands Branch oversees the urban planning and redevelopment in Hong Kong. Its responsibilities include ensuring a sufficient land supply and optimising land use, implementing urban renewal plans and maintaining a land administration system. The divisions under the Planning and Lands Branch are:

- Lands Division
- Planning Division
- Urban Renewal and Buildings Division
- Administration Unit
- Northern Metropolis Co-ordination Office

=== Works Branch ===
The Works Branch of the Bureau focuses on the management and implementation of infrastructure, as well as heritage conservation and maintenance in Hong Kong. The divisions under the Works Branch are:

- Works Division
- Project Strategy and Governance Office
- Legal Advisory Division (Works)
- Energizing Kowloon East Office (EKEO)

== Subordinate agencies ==
The following public agencies are managed by the bureau:

- Buildings Department
- Lands Department
  - Lands Administration Office
- Lands Registry
- Planning Department
- Architectural Services Department
- Civil Engineering and Development Department
- Drainage Services Department
- Electrical and Mechanical Services Department
- Water Supplies Department

== Energising Kowloon East Office (EKEO) ==
The plans to redevelop Kowloon East, an industrial area that spans along the Victoria Harbour between Kwun Tong, Kowloon Bay and former Kai Tak Airport, was first announced in a policy address on 12 October 2011. The redevelopment plan would transform Kowloon East into a second central business district in addition to Central. In June 2012, the Development Bureau founded the Energising Kowloon East Office as an entity under the Works Branch to steer and oversee the development of this area.

== See also ==
- Urban Renewal Authority
- Town Planning Board
- Construction Industry Council
- Harbourfront Commission
- City Gallery (Hong Kong)
- Public Works Department (Hong Kong)
