= Francis Alfred Cooper =

Francis Alfred Cooper, CMG (23 January 1860 – 26 May 1933) was a British civil engineer and colonial administrator. He was the first Director of Public Works of Hong Kong from 1891 to 1897, as well as member of the Executive and Legislative Councils, and later Director of Public Works and member of the Legislative Council of Ceylon.

== Biography ==
Cooper was the fourth son of the Rev. William Waldo Cooper, M.A., Rural Dean of Walshcroft, Rector of West Rasen, Lincolnshire, and justice of the peace of the Parts of Lindsey.

Cooper was educated at Rossall School and at Loughborough Grammar School and served as a pupil from 1879 to 1882 and later an assistant from 1882 to 1887 at the office of James Mansergh, then President of the Institution of Civil Engineers, Westminster. During that time he became Member of the Institution of Civil Engineers and Fellow of the Royal Sanitary Institute.

Cooper joined the colonial service in 1887 when he was sent to Hong Kong as Sanitary Surveyor, Inspector of Buildings, Assistant Surveyor-General, Acting Surveyor-General, and Resident Engineer in charge of Water and Drainage Department. He was in charge of the reconstruction with engineer H. Champernowne after one of the most devastating rainstorms in Hong Kong history in 1889.

In 1891, he was appointed Director of Public Works. During his service, he built the Yau Ma Tei Pump Station which still exists today. He also played a role in the legislation of the Taipingshan Resumption Ordinance of 1895 and also during the epidemic of plague in 1896. At the same time he was also appointed member of the Executive and Legislative Councils of Hong Kong, and appointed President of the Sanitary Board in 1895.

Cooper held these positions until 1897 when he was appointed Director of Public Works of Ceylon. In Ceylon, he was also member of the Legislative Council of Ceylon, Waterworks Engineer for the city of Colombo and a member of the Harbour Board and the Colombo Municipal Council.

== Honours ==
For his services, he received the Companionship of the Order of St Michael and St George on 1 January 1901. Cooper Road on Jardine's Lookout, Hong Kong Island is named after him.

== Marriage ==
Cooper married Frances Louisa in 1894, daughter of the Rev. G. T. Palmer, M.A., Honorary Canon of Rochester, Rural Dean and Rector of Newington.

Government offices
New title	Director of Public Works; 1891–1897	Succeeded by Robert Daly Ormsby
