= Eric Ma =

Hong Kong engineer and executive

Eric Ma GBS, JP
- 馬紹祥

Secretary for Development
- In office 13 February 2017 – 30 June 2017
- Chief Executive: Leung Chun-ying
- Preceded by: Paul Chan
- Succeeded by: Michael Wong Wai-lun

Personal details
- Born: 1963 (age 62–63)
- Education: University of Hong Kong (BSc); Monash University (MScEng)

Eric Ma Siu-cheung, GBS, JP (Chinese: 馬紹祥; born 1963) is a Hong Kong engineer and a business executive. He served as Secretary for Development of the Hong Kong SAR government. He was CEO of New World Development Company Ltd and CEO of NWS Holdings Ltd.

== Biography ==
Ma graduated from the University of Hong Kong with a Bachelor of Science in Engineering (1st Hon) and later obtained a master's degree of Engineering Science in Transportation from Monash University, Australia. He became an engineer and held senior positions in major consulting firms and participated in major development projects in Hong Kong. He is a fellow of several professional bodies including the Hong Kong Institution of Engineers, the Institution of Civil Engineers, the Chartered Institution of Highways and Transportation (CIHT), and the Institution of Structural Engineers. He is the President of the Hong Kong Institution of Engineers for session 2024/25.

Ma joined Maunsell Consultants Asia Ltd in 2001, becoming Managing Director in 2007. He was tasked by AECOM with its overseas business expansion in Asia, in which Ma became the Executive Vice President for Civil and Infrastructure Business in the Asia-Pacific Region.

On 6 January 2014, he was appointed Under Secretary of Development under Paul Chan Mo-po. He succeeded Chan to be Acting Secretary for Development on 16 January 2017 when Chan took over as Financial Secretary of Hong Kong. Ma was officially appointed on 13 February 2017.

Political offices
Preceded by Paul Chan	Secretary for Development; 13 February –30 June 2017	Succeeded by Michael Wong
