= Richard McNeil Henderson =

Richard McNeil Henderson, CBE (Chinese: 軒德蓀; 14 January 1886 – 16 March 1972) was a British engineer and colonial administrator. He was the Director of Public Works (Hong Kong) from 1932 to 1939.

Henderson was a member of the Institution of Civil Engineers and Institution of Mechanical Engineers. During his service as Director of Public Works, he was responsible for the construction of South Kowloon Magistracy in 1933, Wan Chai Market in 1937 and Central Market in 1938. He was appointed a CBE in 1939. He was an ex officio member of the Legislative Council of Hong Kong.

Henderson Road at Jardine's Lookout, Hong Kong Island, is named after him.

Government offices
Preceded by Harold Thomas Creasy	Director of Public Works; 1932–1939	Succeeded by Alexander Bruce Purves
