= Civil Engineering and Development Department =

Department of the Hong Kong Government

- 土木工程拓展署

Agency overview
- Formed: 1 July 2004; 22 years ago
- Headquarters: Civil Engineering and Development Building, 101 Princess Margaret Road, Kowloon
- Employees: 2 094 (Mar 2022)
- Annual budget: HK$2,845 million (2022-23 FY)
- Agency executive: Michael Fong Hok-shing, from 10 May 2022, Director of Civil Engineering and Development
- Website: cedd.gov.hk

Civil Engineering and Development Department
- Chinese: 土木工程拓展署
Transcriptions
Standard Mandarin
- Hanyu Pinyin: Tǔmùgōngchéng Tuòzhǎnshǔ
Yue: Cantonese
- Jyutping: tou2 muk6 gung1 cing4 tok3 zin2 cyu5

The Civil Engineering and Development Department (CEDD) is a department of the Hong Kong government that reports to the Development Bureau. Its major services include provision of land and infrastructure, port and marine services, geotechnical services and environment and sustainability services.

== Organisation ==
The department has a headquarters, 2 functional offices (the Civil Engineering Office and the Geotechnical Engineering Office) and 5 regional development offices (the Sustainable Lantau Office, the East Development Office, the South Development Office, the West Development Office and the North Development Office).

== History ==
The department was formed on 1 July 2004 through a merger of the Civil Engineering Department and the Territory Development Department. The CEDD formerly came under the (former) Environment, Transport and Works Bureau.

== Mining Division ==
In 1951 in the Mining Section was created by the Labour Department, which was then transferred to the Civil Engineering Services Department in 1991 with it eventually renamed as the Mining Division.

== See also ==
- Mining in Hong Kong
