= Harold Thomas Creasy =

British engineer and colonial administrator

Harold Thomas Creasy, CBE (1873 – 31 October 1950) was a British engineer and colonial administrator. He was the Director of Public Works of Hong Kong from 1923 to 1932.

Creasy was born in Ceylon in 1873. He studied at Bedford School and Crystal Palace School of Engineering and worked under Arthur C. Pain on improvements to the water system in Farnham 1895. He was the Member of the Institution of Civil Engineers and Associate Member of the Institute of Mechanical Engineers.

In 1898, he joined the Public Works Department of Ceylon as district engineer and was appointed provincial engineer in 1900 and deputy director in 1917. He was subsequently occupied the director for a period and was a member of the Legislative Council of Ceylon. He was also the president of the Engineering Association of Ceylon. In the First World War, Creasy was a captain in the Royal Engineers. From 1923 to 1932 he was the Director of Public Works of Hong Kong. He was also member of the Executive and Legislative Councils and a justice of the peace at the time. He was responsible for the constructions of the Sham Shui Po Police Station in 1924 and Central Fire Station in 1926.

Creasy was appointed a Commander of the Order of the British Empire (CBE) in the 1927 Birthday Honours.

He retired in 1932 and died on 31 October 1950. Creasy Road, Jardine's Lookout on Hong Kong Island is named after him.

Government offices
Preceded by Thomas Luff Perkins	Director of Public Works; 1923–1932	Succeeded by Richard McNeil Henderson
