= Theodore Louis Bowring =

British engineer and colonial civil servant

Theodore Louis Bowring, CMG, OBE (29 July 1901 – 24 June 1967) is a British engineer and a colonial civil servant. He was the Director of Public Works in British Honduras, Nyasaland and Hong Kong.

== Biography ==
Educated at Chatham House School, Ramsgate and Thames Nautical Training College, Bowring studied at the Crystal Palace School of Practical Engineering from 1920 to 1922. He served as a midshipman in the RNR from 1918 to 1919 during the World War I.

He served in the colonial service in 1925 after four years of practical training with Sir John Jackson Ltd under Percy Hall. He was specialised in municipal engineering, mainly bridges, buildings and hydro-electric projects. He worked in Gold Coast, Federated Malay States, British Honduras, Nyasaland and Hong Kong. He was an Executive Engineering, Public Works in Gold Coast and was an Assistant Engineer to Topham, Jones & Railton Ltd, contractors, on the Perak River contract of constructing a dam and a power plant.

He returned from the Far East in 1930 as a Senior Assistant Engineer to Lehane, Mackenzie & Shand Ltd, contractors, of Derby, and spent three years at Hebden Bridge in Yorkshire on the construction of Gorple Reservoir. He then worked as an Engineer-Agent to Hayes & Greatrex Ltd, contractors, of Romford, where he was in charge of small sewerage contracts for local authorities.

Borwing returned to colonial service in 1935 when he was sent to British Honduras as Executive Engineer, Public Works, under Director E. A. Boyce. He was in charge of construction and maintenance of roads, bridges and public buildings.

During the World War II, Borwing served in the Royal Engineers with the rank of Major, and constructed an aerodrome and two hutted camps in France in which he was mentioned in despatches in 1940.

After the war, Bowring returned to British Honduras as Director of Public Works. He was responsible for the design, construction and maintenance of all engineering works in the colony with the expenditure of about £125,000 per year.

He was the Director of Public Works in Nyasaland in 1948 and in Hong Kong in 1950 before he retired from the colonial service in 1957. In Hong Kong, he was responsible for resettling the refugees after the 1953 Shek Kip Mei Fire in which bungalows of 10x15 feet for three to four persons was called "Bowring Bungalows", named after the Director.

He was appointed Adviser on Engineering Appointments in 1958 to the Colonial Office and then to the Department of Technical Co-operation from 1958 to 1961. He acted as Consultant to Scott, Wilson, Kirkpatrick & Partners from 1962 to 1965 on major engineering projects overseas.

For his colonial services, he was awarded the OBE in 1948 and CMG in 1955. He was also a member of the Institution of Structural Engineers.

He died in 1967, survived by his wife and one daughter.

Government offices
Preceded by Edward Audley Boyce	Director of Public Works, Hong Kong; 1950–1957	Succeeded by Allan Inglis
