= Michael Wong Wai-lun =

Hong Kong official

The Honourable Michael Wong JP
- 黃偉綸
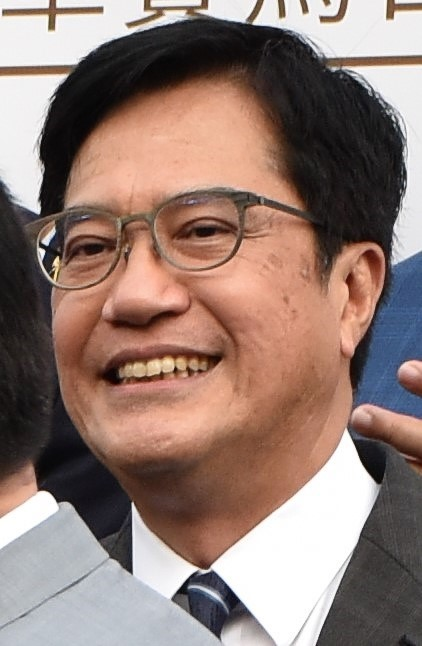
- Wong at the trophy presentation ceremony of the Queen Elizabeth II Cup at the Sha Tin Racecourse on 30 April 2023

Deputy Financial Secretary
- Incumbent
- Assumed office 1 July 2022
- Chief Executive: John Lee
- Preceded by: Position established

Secretary for Housing Acting
- Incumbent
- Assumed office 29 October 2026
- Chief Executive: John Lee
- Preceded by: Winnie Ho

Secretary for Development
- In office 1 July 2017 – 30 June 2022
- Chief Executive: Carrie Lam
- Preceded by: Eric Ma
- Succeeded by: Bernadette Linn

Permanent Secretary for Development (Planning and Lands)
- In office August 2015 – June 2017
- Preceded by: Thomas Chow Tat-ming
- Succeeded by: Bernadette Linn Hon-ho

Director of Marine
- In office February 2014 – August 2015
- Preceded by: Francis Liu Hon-por
- Succeeded by: Maisie Cheng Mei-sze

Director of Information Services
- In office August 2009 – February 2014
- Preceded by: Betty Fung Ching Suk-yee
- Succeeded by: Patrick Nip

Personal details
- Born: 1962 (age 63–64)
- Spouse: May Chan Wing-shiu (m. 2008)
- Education: University of Hong Kong (BSocSc); University of London (LLB)
- Occupation: Politician; Civil servant

Michael Wong Wai-lun, JP (Chinese: 黃偉綸; born 1962) is a Hong Kong government official who has been Deputy Financial Secretary since 2022.

== Early life ==
Wong received a Bachelor of Social Sciences Degree from the University of Hong Kong and a Bachelor of Laws Degree from the University of London (External Programme).

== Career ==
He joined the Administrative Service in August 1985. He served in many bureaux and departments, including the City and New Territories Administration, the Television and Entertainment Licensing Authority, the Legal Department, the Central Policy Unit, the former Trade and Industry Branch, the Business and Services Promotion Unit, the Economic Services Bureau, the Security Bureau and the former Economic Development and Labour Bureau.

He was promoted to the deputy secretary for education in July 2007 and the director of information services in 2009. he rose to the rank of Administrative Officer Staff Grade A in April 2011. He became the director of marine in 2014 and permanent secretary for development (planning and lands) in 2015.

He was appointed as the secretary for development in July 2017 of Chief Executive Carrie Lam's administration.

In October 2022, after John Lee's policy address, Wong was asked about criticism that the government was playing with numbers and introducing a new index to give the appearance of lower public housing wait times, and Wong dismissed such criticism.

In September 2023, after the launch of the "Night Vibes Hong Kong" campaign to increase economic activity in the evenings, Wong said the government did not find it best to "quantify" the campaign's effects.

In October 2026, following resignation of Secretary for Housing Winnie Ho after publication of Independent Committee's report on Wang Fuk Court fire, Wong was named as the acting secretary.

=== Response to Stephen Roach ===
In July 2026, after economist Stephen S. Roach renewed his argument that Hong Kong was "over" in a column titled "Yes, the Hong Kong of Old Is Over", Wong rebutted the claim in an op-ed published in Sing Tao Daily. According to the South China Morning Post, Wong wrote that "some critics appear to be driven by bias against China rather than objective analysis".

In an August 2026 post, Roach singled out Wong's article, along with responses by solicitor Virginia Lee in China Daily and lawyer Adam Clermont on LinkedIn, as "especially impressive", writing that they "picked apart my arguments and made me think about the main assumptions of my thesis".

== Personal life ==
Wong married May Chan Wing-shiu, also a civil servant, in 2008. As of January 2022, Chan took up the post of Commissioner for Labour on September 26, 2022.

In November 2022, Wong tested positive for COVID-19.

Government offices
Preceded by Betty Fung Ching Suk-yee	Director of Information Services; 2009–2014	Succeeded by Patrick Nip
Preceded by Francis Liu Hon-por	Director of Marine; 2014–2015	Succeeded by Maisie Cheng Mei-sze
Preceded by Thomas Chow Tat-ming	Permanent Secretary for Development (Planning and Lands); 2015–2017	Succeeded by Bernadette Linn Hon-ho
Political offices
Preceded by Eric Ma	Secretary for Development; 2017–2022	Succeeded by Bernadette Linn
New title	Deputy Financial Secretary; 2022–present	Incumbent
Order of precedence
Previous: Warner Cheuk; Deputy Chief Secretary for Administration	Hong Kong order of precedence Deputy Financial Secretary	Next: Horace Cheung; Deputy Secretary for Justice
