= William Chatham =

British engineer and colonial administrator in Hong Kong (born 1859)

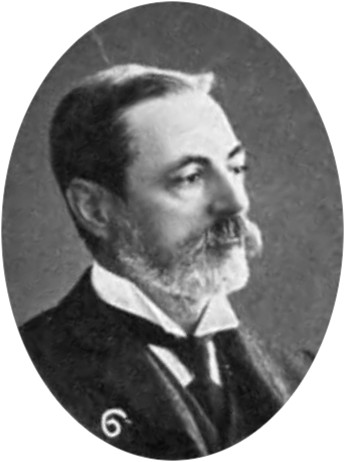

William Chatham CMG MICE (July 1859–1941) was a Scottish-born engineer and government official of Hong Kong. He was the Director of Public Works from 1901 to 1921, as well as member of the Executive and Legislative Councils and Vice-President of the Sanitary Board.

== Biography ==
He was born in July 1859 and was educated at the Royal High School, Edinburgh and at Edinburgh University. He was trained to be an engineer and joined Thos. Meik & Sons, the then well-known civil engineering firm, as an assistant and then the engineer of the Bristol Docks. He arrived in Hong Kong in 1890 as an executive engineer with the Public Works Department. In 1901, he became the Director of Public Works, a position he held until his retirement. He also served as a member of the Executive and Legislative Councils of Hong Kong and as Vice-President of the Sanitary Board.

He was a member of the Queen's Jubilee Committee, acting as honorary secretary for some years, and took part in the £20,000 construction of Jubilee Road (now Victoria Road) and the Hospital for Women and Children. He resided at the Peak and was member of the Hong Kong Club.

When Chatham retired in 1921, a valediction published in the Hong Kong Government Administration Report of 1921 stated that "The majority of the Public Works of the Colony as they exist today are standing monument to his energy and foresight."

Chatham Road North, Chatham Road South, and Chatham Court in Tsim Sha Tsui, Kowloon are all named after him, as is Chatham Path on Hong Kong Island.

He had a daughter named Agnes Catherine and five sons. Agnes married Edward Dudley Corscaden Wolfe, an Assistant Registrar-General and Police Magistrate in Hong Kong.

After his retirement in 1921, Chatham and his wife returned to the UK and lived in London. He died in 1941 aged 81.

Government offices
Preceded by Robert Daly Ormsby	Director of Public Works; 1901–1921	Succeeded by Thomas Luff Perkins
