= Our Hong Kong Foundation =

Think tank in Hong Kong

- Abbreviation: OHKF
- Formation: 10 November 2014; 11 years ago
- Type: Think tank
- Headquarters: 19/F., Nan Fung Tower, 88 Connaught Road, Central, Hong Kong
- Location: Hong Kong
- Honorary Chairman: Tung Chee-hwa
- Chairman: Bernard Charnwut Chan
- Vice Chairman: Henry Cheng
- Website: ourhkfoundation.org.hk

Our Hong Kong Foundation
- Traditional Chinese: 團結香港基金
- Simplified Chinese: 团结香港基金
- Literal meaning: United Hong Kong Foundation
Transcriptions
Standard Mandarin
- Hanyu Pinyin: Tuánjié Xiānggǎng Jījīn
Yue: Cantonese
- Yale Romanization: Tyùhn git hēung góng gēi gām
- Jyutping: Tyun4 git3 hoeng1 gong2 gei1 gam1

Our Hong Kong Foundation is a Hong Kong think tank focused on the city's social and economic development. It was established in 2014 by Tung Chee-hwa, a former chief executive and a vice-chairman of the Chinese People's Political Consultative Conference, in response to the 2014 Hong Kong protests.

As the largest think tank in Hong Kong, it conducts public policy research in land, housing, technology, social innovation, the economies of Hong Kong and mainland China, arts, and population. In addition to research, it serves as a group to connect to other interest groups. In the University of Pennsylvania's 2016 Global Go To Think Tanks Report, Our Hong Kong Foundation ranked the highest amongst all Hong Kong–based think tanks and listed in the Think Tank to Watch in 2017 achievement category.

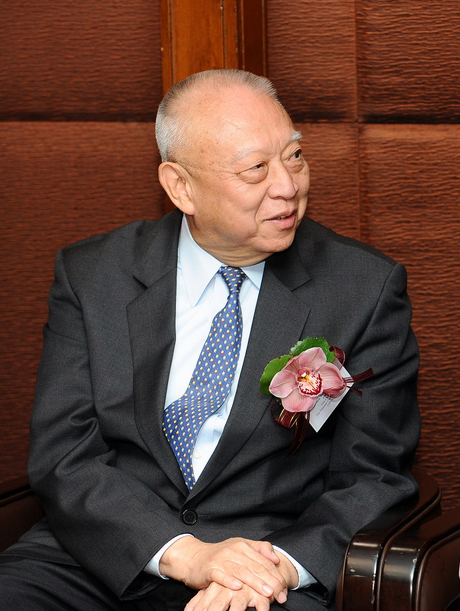
Tung Chee-hwa, then a vice-chairman of the National Committee of the Chinese People's Political Consultative Conference, in 2011

== History ==
Tung announced the think tank on 10 November 2014 with 88 advisers that included businesspeople, athletes, academics, and former senior civil servants, including Jack Ma, Lee Wai Sze, Antony Leung, and Yang Chen-Ning. He said the foundation would help develop political leaders in Hong Kong and improve social mobility. Peacefully ending the sit-in protests against the 2014–2015 Hong Kong electoral reform was also described by Tung as one of the foundation's top priorities.

Tung had been the chairman since the think tank was founded. As concerns over his health grew, he resigned as chairman on 28 September 2023 and was succeeded by Bernard Chan. Tung then became the foundation's honorary chairman.

== Political position ==
Our Hong Kong Foundation has been described as "pro-establishment" or "pro-Beijing". Bernard Chan said his role as the think tank's chairman was to tell “good Hong Kong stories” and advocate for Hong Kong and mainland China internationally. Zheng Yanxiong, the director of the Hong Kong Liaison Office, said the foundation should help integrate Hong Kong into China's development and to work with partners around the world to tell good stories about China.

== Research areas ==
The OHKF's research includes the following topic areas:

- Land and Housing
- Transport and Logistics
- Economics and Finance
- Healthcare and Ageing
- Science and Tech Innovation
- Green and Sustainability
- Social Innovation
- Arts and Sports
- Education and Youth
- Greater Bay Area Development

== Publications ==
The Foundation maintains a wide-ranging news website, ThinkHK.

Other research and advocacy publications include (in approximately chronological order):

Land and Housing

- Maximizing Land Use to Boost Development, Optimizing Housing Resources to Benefit All, 2015
- From Housing Market Outlook to Land Supply Strategy, 2016
- Rethinking Public Housing Policy Building Sustainable Land Reserve, 2016
- From Large-Scale Reclamation to an Ideal Home, 2017
- Housing Policy Reform to Narrow Wealth Gap Urgent Formation of Land to Improve People’s Livelihood, 2017
- Lacunae in Land Planning: Undersized, Undersupplied and Underestimated, 2018
- Re-imagining Hong Kong with a Game-Changer: Enhanced East Lantau Metropolis, 2018
- Downward Spiral of Housing Demand Estimation, 2019
- Hanging on the Housing Supply Cliff - Are There More Bandages Around?, 2019
- Vision of Universal Affordable Housing in Hong Kong, 2019
- Cutting Red Tape to Catch Up with Shortfalls in Land and Housing Supply, 2020
- Analysis on the Benefits and Possible Development Models of Lantau Tomorrow Vision, 2020
- Decisive Moment — Can Hong Kong Save Itself from the Land and Housing Supply Crisis?, 2021
- Building a Global City of the Future – Envisioning Sustainable Urbanisation of the New Territories, 2021
- Developing the New Territories and Cutting Red Tapes to Expedite Land and Housing Supply, 2021
- Immediate Actions to Resolve Hong Kong's Housing Conundrum: Cut the Red Tape Now!, 2022
- Annual 10-Year Housing Supply Forecast, 2022
- Home Ownership and Youth Social Mobility, 2023
- 10-Year Housing Supply Forecast 2023, 2023
- Development Strategies for San Tin Technopole: From Ground Zero to Innovation Hub, 2023
- Hong Kong Housing Landscape Navigator 2024, 2024

Transport and Logistics

- Strategic Land Development for Jobs: From Brownfields to Modern Logistics, 2020
- Discussion on Brownfield Development Strategy, 2020
- Transport infrastructures to pave the way for a thriving northern New Territories, 2022
- Opportunity for Brownfield Resettlement and Industry Upgrading – Vehicle Maintenance Industry as an Illustration, 2023

Economics and Finance

- Yes, Hong Kong CAN!, 2016
- Riding on Mainland’s Economic Development in a New Era, 2016
- Re-emergence of Glittering Stars, 2018
- Central Bank Digital Currency: The Cornerstone of Digital Financial Infrastructure, 2021
- Redefine Hong Kong’s Tourism Edge to Recreate Hong Kong’s Retail Flair, 2024

Healthcare and Ageing

- An Investment for the Celebration of Aging, 2016
- Gerontechnology Landscape Report, 2017
- Fit for Purpose: A Health System for the 21st Century, 2018
- An Advocacy Study on Health System Capacity Constraints - The Severe Shortage of Doctors in Hong Kong Public Hospitals, 2019
- Fostering Medical-social Collaboration in Achieving Quality End-of-life Care, 2019
- Fit to Practise: Strengthening Hong Kong’s Doctor Workforce Today for a Better Tomorrow, 2021
- Building an Age-Friendly City – Embedding Gerontechnology Into Everyday Life, 2021
- Strategic Purchasing: Enabling Health for All, 2021
- Towards a Fit-for-Purpose Mental Health System, 2022
- A Multi-Pronged Approach to Foster Chinese Medicine Development, 2023
- Adding Life to Years: Comprehensive End-of-Life Care for All, 2024
- Transforming Chinese Medicine through System Development and Integration, 2024

Science and Tech Innovation

- The Ecosystem of Innovation and Technology in Hong Kong, 2015
- FinTech Advocacy Study, 2017
- Unleash the Potential in Science and Technology Innovation: Develop Hong Kong into an International R&D Powerhouse, 2019
- Building the Technology Bridge for Scientific Breakthroughs: Developing an Innovation Hub of the Future, 2020
- Strategic Collaborations between Hong Kong and Shenzhen in Biotechnology – Capitalising opportunities in the Loop for Policy Innovations, 2021
- Unleashing Hong Kong Youths’ Potentials in Technology Innovation to Build a National Engine for Innovation and Entrepreneurship, 2022
- Developing Hong Kong into Asia’s Leading Clinical Innovation Hub, 2023
- Building Hong Kong as a Cradle for Successful Entrepreneurship, 2024

Social Innovation

- Social Innovation Research Report, 2016
- Social Impact Assessment Booklet, 2017
- Green Bond Landscape Report, 2017
- Pay-for-Success Advocacy Report, 2017
- A Policy Review on ESG Reporting, 2019

Arts and Sports

- Arts Innovation Research Series I — Unleashing our museums: Reforms toward a new governance model, 2016
- Arts Innovation Research Series II — Celebrating the Inclusive Power of Arts, 2018
- Innovating Creative Cultures—Arts Tech, 2020
- Be Virtually Ready: Strategy for Future Cultural Creative Industries, 2022
- Breaking Boundaries to Develop Hong Kong into a Mega Sports Events Capital, 2024

Education and Youth

- Applied Education Research Report, 2019
- Liberating Liberal Studies, 2020
- Preparing for the 21st Century Globally Competitive Workforce—Industry-led Standards of Applied Education and Lifelong Learning, 2021
- Developing Hong Kong into an International Education Hub, 2023

Greater Bay Area Development

- Greater Bay Area Opportunities: Survey and Analytical Observations, 2021
- Facilitating Greater Bay Area Talent Flow and Development Opportunities for Hong Kong Citizens, 2022
- Opportunities and Challenges for Hong Kong Youths on their Entrepreneurial Journey in Guangzhou, 2024
- Our Hong Kong Foundation—Dah Sing Bank Greater Bay Area Industry Development Index 2024, 2024
