= Housing, Planning and Lands Bureau =

Former policy bureau of the Hong Kong government

The Housing, Planning and Lands Bureau (Chinese: 房屋及規劃地政局) is a former policy bureau of the Government of Hong Kong, which was responsible for urban planning policy, public housing and the management and selling of public lands. It was headed by the Secretary for Housing, Planning and Lands.

The bureau was established in 2002, and was abolished in 2007. Its scope was transferred to the Transport and Housing Bureau and the Development Bureau.

== See also ==
- Government Secretariat (Hong Kong)
