= Robert Daly Ormsby =

British engineer and colonial administrator (1846–1927)

Robert Daly Ormsby (1846–1927) was a British engineer and colonial administrator. He was the Director of Public Works of Hong Kong from 1897 to 1901.

During his service, he was a member of the committee headed by James Haldane Stewart Lockhart, Colonial Secretary and Registrar-General at the time to settle the newly acquired New Territories. He also led the construction of Tai Po Road starting in 1899, one of the first highways in the colony which connects Kowloon and the New Territories, as well as No. 7 Police Station. Ormsby Street in Tai Hang, Hong Kong Island is named after him. He was later appointed Director of Public Works of Ceylon.

Government offices
Preceded by Francis Alfred Cooper	Director of Public Works; 1897–1901	Succeeded by William Chatham
