= Lands Department (Hong Kong) =

Department of the Hong Kong Government

- 地政總署

Government department overview
- Formed: April 1, 1982; 44 years ago August 1, 1993; 33 years ago
- Preceding agencies: Crown Lands and Survey Office; Buildings and Lands Department
- Headquarters: 18/F-24/F, North Point Government Offices, 333 Java Road, North Point, Hong Kong
- Motto: Land administration in Hong Kong for the greater benefit of the community
- Head responsible: Maurice LOO Kam Wah, Director of Lands
- Deputy head responsible: Deputy Director/General; Deputy Director/Specialist; Deputy Director/Survey & Mapping; Deputy Director/Legal
- Government department executive: Principal Executive Officer; Senior Principal Land Executive
- Parent department: Development Bureau
- Child agencies: Lands Administration Office; Survey and Mapping Office; Legal Advisory and Conveyancing Office; Departmental Administration Office
- Key document: Hong Kong Ordinances
- Website: www.landsd.gov.hk

The Lands Department is a government department under the Development Bureau responsible for all land matters in Hong Kong. Established in 1982, it comprises three functional offices: the Lands Administration Office (LAO), the Survey and Mapping Office (SMO) and the Legal Advisory and Conveyancing Office (LACO).

== Organization ==
Lands Department
Director
Legal Advisory and Conveyancing Office	Lands Administration Office	Survey and Mapping Office	Departmental Administration Office
Deputy Director; Legal	Deputy Director; General	Deputy Director; Specialist	Deputy Director; Survey & Mapping
Principal Solicitor	Principal Government Land Agent	Principal Government Land Agent	Principal Government Land Surveyor
Assistant Directors	Assistant Directors	Assistant Directors	Assistant Directors
Deputy Principal Solicitor	Government Land Agent	Government Land Agent	Government Land Surveyor
Assistant Principal Solicitor	District Lands Officers; Chief Estate Surveyor	Chief Estate Surveyors	Chief Land Surveyors	Principal Executive Officer
District LACO Offices	District Land Offices	Functional Sections	Regional Division
Functional Sections	Technical Division	Department Secretary; Chief Executive Officer
Senior Principal Land Executive	Chief Geotechnical Engineer	Development Division	Senior Treasury Accountant
Headquarters Section	Slope Maintenance Section	Land Information Centre	Chief Official Languages Officer

== Lands Administration Office ==
Lands Department
Lands Administration Office
Deputy Director (General)	Deputy Director (Specialist)
Principal Government Land Agent	Principal Government Land Agent
Assistant Director (Regional 1)	Assistant Director (Regional 2)	Assistant Director (Regional 3)	Assistant Director (Headquarters)	Assistant Director (Specialist 1)	Assistant Director (Specialist 2)	Assistant Director (Specialist 3)
Government Land Agent	Government Land Agent	Government Land Agent	Government Land Agent	Government Land Agent	Government Land Agent	Government Land Agent
District Lands Officer; Chief Estate Surveyor	District Lands Officer; Chief Estate Surveyor	District Lands Officer; Chief Estate Surveyor	Chief Estate Surveyor	Senior Principal Land Executive	Chief Estate Surveyor	Chief Estate Surveyor	Chief Estate Surveyor
District Lands Office; Hong Kong East	District Lands Office; Kowloon East	District Lands Office; North	Headquarters Section	Headquarters Section	Valuation Section	Estate Management Section (Management Unit)	Acquisition Section
District Lands Office; Hong Kong West and South	District Lands Office; Kowloon West	District Lands Office; Yuen Long	Land Supply Section	Railway Development Section	Development Control Section	Urban Renewal Section
District Lands Office; Sai Kung	District Lands Office; Tsuen Wan and Kwai Tsing	District Lands Office; Tuen Mun	Estate Management Section (Estate Unit)	Slope Maintenance Section; Chief Geotechnical Engineer	New Development Area Section
District Lands Office; Islands	District Lands Office; Sha Tin	Training Section; Senior Estate Surveyor	Administration Unit; Chief Executive Officer
District Lands Office; Tai Po	Special Duties Task Force; Principal Land Executive; Senior Forestry Officer	Village Improvement and Special Duties Section; Principal Land Executive

== See also ==
- Hong Kong Guide, an atlas published annually by the Survey and Mapping Office
