= Hong Kong Guide =

Atlas of Hong Kong

Hong Kong Guide (Chinese: 香港街) is a Hong Kong atlas published by the Survey and Mapping Office (SMO), Lands Department of Hong Kong Government. From 2005, Hong Kong Guide 2005 includes photomaps in parallel to traditional maps.
