= Buildings Department =

Hong Kong government department

- 屋宇署

Government department overview
- Formed: 1993
- Preceding Government department: Buildings Ordinance Office
- Headquarters: North Tower, West Kowloon Government Office, 11 Hoi Ting Road, Kowloon
- Government department executive: Director of Buildings
- Website: bd.gov.hk

The Buildings Department (BD) is a department of the Hong Kong Government responsible for building codes, building safety, and inspection. It was founded in 1993 and is now subordinate to the Development Bureau.

== History ==
The Buildings Department succeeded the former Buildings Ordinance Office (BOO). BOO first existed under the former Public Works Department. From 1982-1986 it existed under the Building Development Department, and from 1986-1993 under the Buildings and Lands Department.

In March 2021, the BD was criticized because some cases of misconnected sewage pipes had been unresolved by the department for more than a decade, resulting in waste flowing into the ocean.
