= Environment, Transport and Works Bureau =

The Environment, Transport and Works Bureau (ETWB) was formerly a policy bureau of the Hong Kong Government in existence from 2002 to 2007. It was responsible for:

- Environmental protection
- Transport
- Public works
- Waste management

The bureau was disestablished in 2007, with its duties redistributed to the Environment Bureau, the Transport Branch of the Transport and Housing Bureau and the Works Branch of the Development Bureau.

== History ==
It was created in 2002 through the merger of the Transport Bureau (the Transport Branch before 1997) and the Works Bureau (the Works Branch before 1997; formerly the Public Works Department, and the environment portfolio of the Environment and Food Bureau. Sarah Liao held the position of Secretary for Environment, Transport and Works throughout the existence of the bureau.
