= Bernadette Linn =

Hong Kong government official (born 1964)

The Honourable Bernadette Linn JP
- 甯漢豪
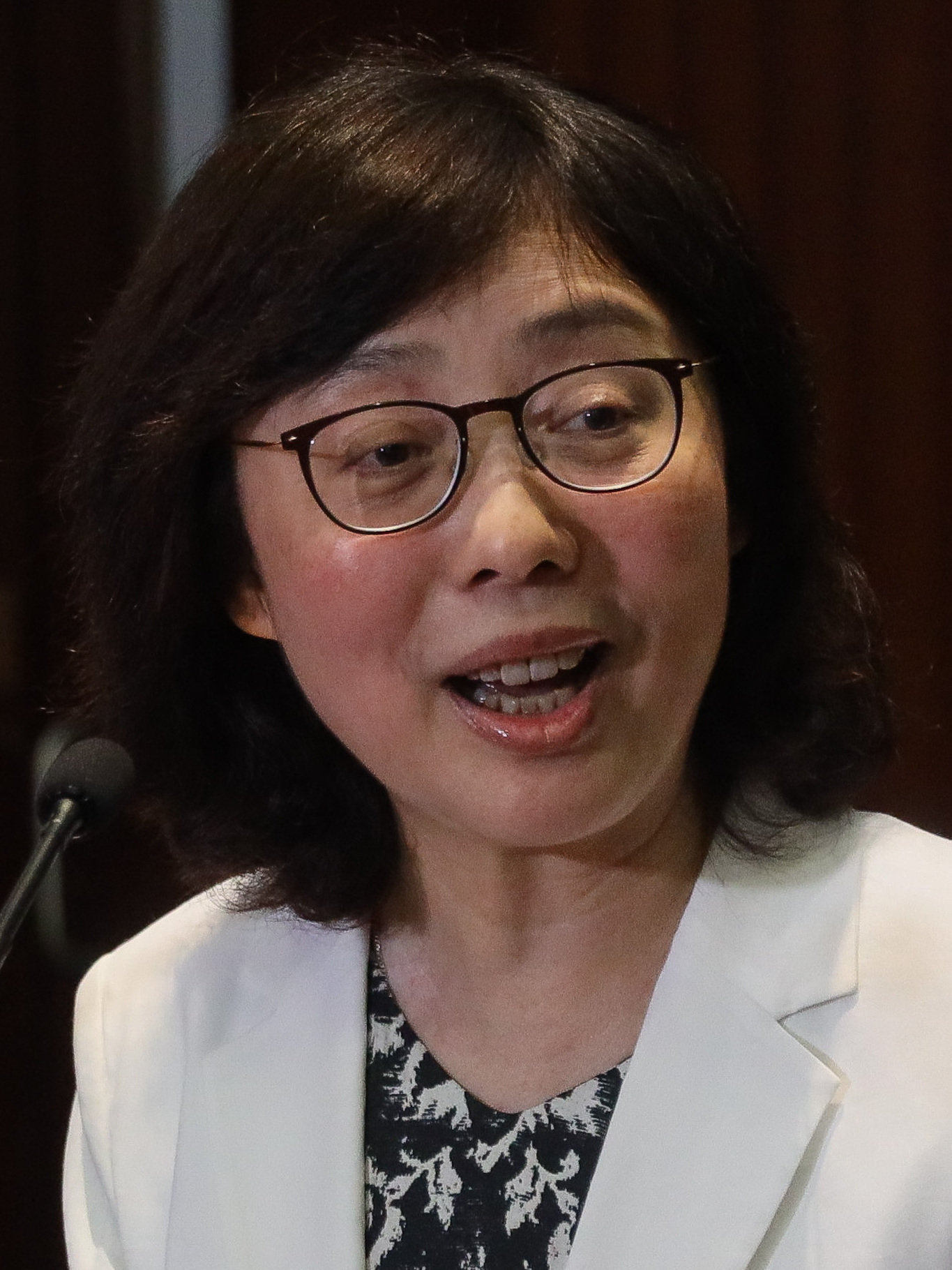
- Linn in 2023

Secretary for Development
- Incumbent
- Assumed office 1 July 2022
- Chief Executive: John Lee
- Preceded by: Michael Wong

Permanent Secretary for Development
- In office 1 July 2017 – 30 June 2022
- Preceded by: Michael Wong
- Succeeded by: Doris Ho

Director of Lands
- In office 31 July 2012 – 30 June 2017
- Preceded by: Wong Chung-hang (acting)
- Succeeded by: Thomas Chan

Personal details
- Born: 7 January 1964 (age 62) Hong Kong
- Spouse: Ying Chi Ho Anthony
- Children: 1 daughter
- Education: University of Hong Kong (BA); University of Michigan (M.J.)

Bernadette Linn Hon Ho JP (Chinese: 甯漢豪, born 7 January 1964) is a Hong Kong government official, currently serving as Secretary for Development.

== Early life and education ==
After studying in Marymount Secondary School, Linn graduated from the University of Hong Kong in 1986 with Bachelor of Arts after studying English literature, and a year later from University of Michigan with Master of Journalism.

== Career ==
Linn joined the civil service in January 1989 as an Administrative Officer. Having served in multiple departments and bureaux, she was promoted to Deputy Secretary for Financial Services and the Treasury in 2008.

In a 2009 Legislative Council committee meeting, Linn criticised pro-democracy lawmaker Leung Kwok-hung for using unparliamentary language, which he declined to classify as, denouncing then Chief Executive Donald Tsang over inadequate measures on elderly welfare. Raising a point of order, Linn said, as a mother herself, the best test to define foul language "would be whether a parent would be prepared to teach his/her children to use the expression in daily conversations or writings". Her comments won appreciations from the officials, and was later promoted to Private Secretary to the Chief Executive in 2010. She was then appointed Director of Lands in 2012, a position which she held for five years.

In July 2017, she succeeded Michael Wong, who was appointed Secretary for Development, as Permanent Secretary for Development. Four years later, she again succeeded Wong to become the Secretary for Development. During her tenure, the construction of 12,000 public housing flats on century-old Fanling Golf Course stirred controversies in the city. Despite different parties, including Hong Kong Golf Club, tournament organisers and even pro-government figures spoke out strongly against the plan, Linn said the government remained determined and vowed to deliver on the housing supply goal despite rezoning delay.

In September 2023, after illegal unauthorized structures were discovered at luxury apartments, Linn said "nobody" was at fault.

Political offices
Previous: Michael Wong	Secretary for Development; 1 July 2022	Incumbent
Government offices
Previous: Wong Chung-hang (acting)	Director of Lands; 31 July 2012 – 30 June 2017	Next: Thomas Chan
Previous: Michael Wong	Permanent Secretary for Development (Planning and Lands); 1 July 2017 – 30 June 2022	Next: Doris Ho
