= Port and Airport Development Strategy =

- Traditional Chinese: 港口及機場發展策略
- Jyutping: gong2 hau2 kap6 gei1 coeng4 faat3 zin2 caak3 loek6
Transcriptions
Yue: Cantonese
- Jyutping: gong2 hau2 kap6 gei1 coeng4 faat3 zin2 caak3 loek6

Alternative Chinese name
- Traditional Chinese: 玫瑰園計劃
- Jyutping: mui4 gwai1 jyun4 gai3 waak6
Transcriptions
Yue: Cantonese
- Jyutping: mui4 gwai1 jyun4 gai3 waak6

The Port and Airport Development Strategy (PADS, Chinese: 港口及機場發展策略) is an infrastructure project in Hong Kong. It is better known as the Rose Garden Project (玫瑰園計劃).

== Background ==
In the early 1980s, the Hong Kong Government already foresaw the incapability of the existing airport and container port to keep up with the growth of Hong Kong. The blueprints for the new airport and container port had already been drawn. However, the government decided to postpone the plan owing to the uncertainty of Hong Kong's future.

After the 1989 Tiananmen Square protests and massacre, the government reproposed the plan in order to restore confidence among Hong Kong's populace. It presented a rosy picture for the future to the Hong Kong people in order to halt the wave of emigration.

== Infrastructure ==
- Airport Core Programme (ACP) in North Lantau
- New container ports in Kwai Chung, Stonecutters Island, Tsing Yi Island and East Lantau (plans for the East Lantau port were later abandoned)
- Railways
- Highways

== Politics ==
The government of People's Republic of China (PRC) cast a great concern in the project for fear that the British would withdraw the monetary reserve of Hong Kong to Britain before the reunification with China 1997. There was a lengthy series of conferences on the matter. Some Chinese officials also urged a downscaling of the project such as building one runway at the airport instead of two.
