= Public Works Department (Hong Kong) =

- 工務司署
- Coat of arms of British Hong Kong

Agency overview
- Formed: 1891

Public Works Department
- Traditional Chinese: 工務司署
Transcriptions
Yue: Cantonese
- Jyutping: gung1 mou6 si1 cyu5

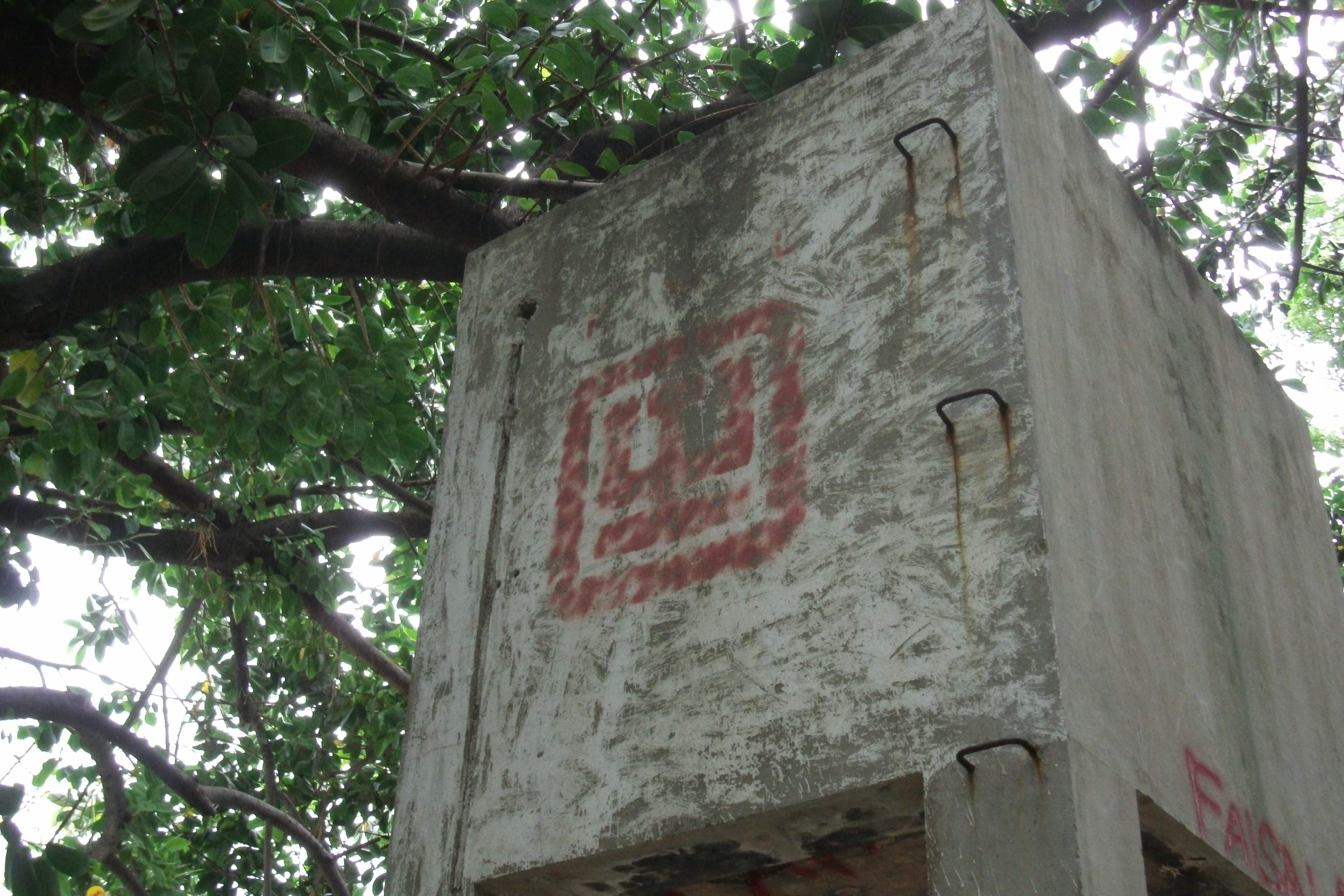
Structure with PWD logo.

The Public Works Department (Chinese: 工務司署) was a department of the Hong Kong Government.

== History ==
The Public Works Department was founded in 1891, but the structure of the department at that time is reportedly unclear.

The first Director of Public Works was Francis Alfred Cooper, from 1891 to 1897.

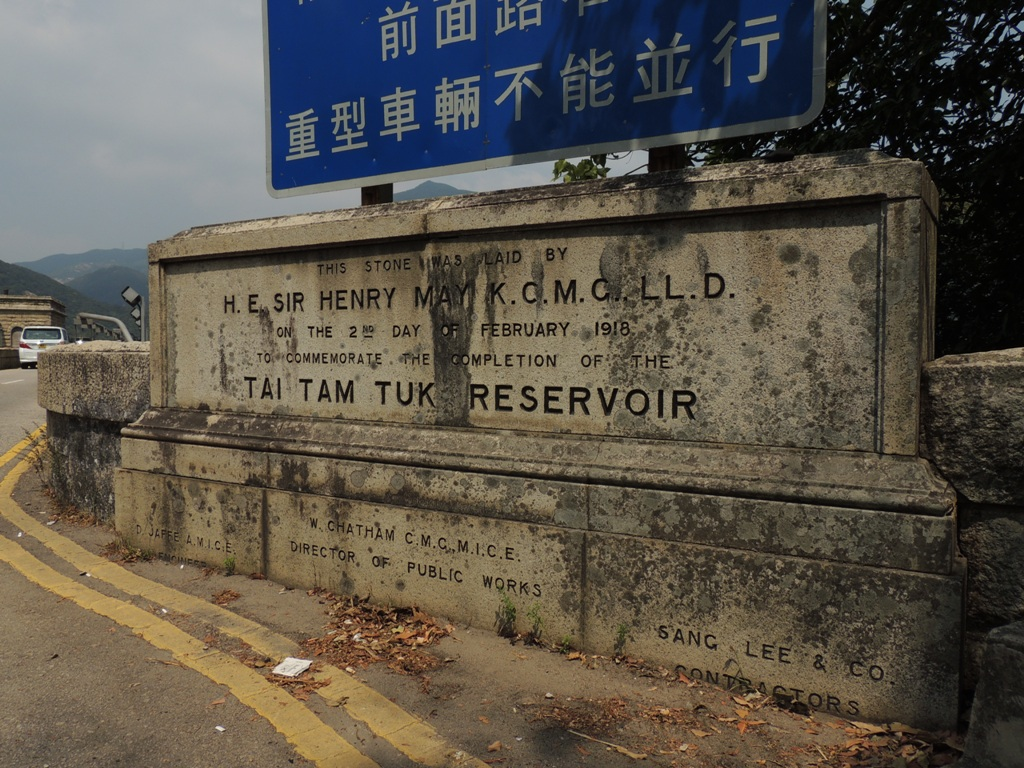
Memorial Stone of Tai Tam Tuk Reservoir. The name of William Chatham, then Director of Public Works appears at the bottom, and that of civil engineer Daniel Jaffé at the bottom left corner.

One of its sub-departments was the Architectural Office. The Architectural Office existed by 1939, and following the disruption in operations during the Japanese occupation, the unit was kept busy in the postwar years by rebuilding work. The 1948 annual report of the Public Works Department reported that 274 government buildings were repaired that year. During the 1960s the Architectural Office was heavily involved in the resettlement housing programmes, but these duties were divested to the Hong Kong Housing Authority upon its 1973 establishment.

In 1982 the department was defederalised and became separate departments in the Lands and Works Branch, headed by the Secretary for Lands and Works, and later in 1989 the Works Branch, headed by the Secretary for Works, after the lands portfolio was reassigned to the Planning, Environment and Lands Branch. In 2002 the Works Bureau was merged with the environment and the transport portfolios to form the Environment, Transport and Works Bureau (EWTB), and in 2007 with the planning and lands portfolios to form the Development Bureau (DevB). The Works Branch in the ETWB and in the DevB is headed by its own permanent secretary, a civil servant from one of the engineering grades.

== See also ==
- Development Bureau
- Secretary for Development
- Secretary for Environment and Ecology

== Citations ==
- Chung Wah Nan (1989). Contemporary Architecture in Hong Kong. Hong Kong: Joint Publishing (H.K.) Co. Ltd.
