= List of Hong Kong legislation =

The following is a list of legislation passed by the Legislative Council of Hong Kong. Some have been repealed and replaced with updated laws. In total there are 1181 ordinances in effect and an assortment of subsidiary legislation associated with them.

Legislative enactments of Hong Kong are called Ordinances.

Name	Type	Year passed	Last amended	Notes
Motor Vehicles Insurance (Third Party Risks) Ordinance Cap 272	Ordinance	1951	1987	
Motor Vehicles Insurance (First Registration Tax) Ordinance Cap 330	Ordinance	1961		
Road (works, Use and Compensation) Ordinance Cap 370	Ordinance	1982		
Road Traffic (Validation of Collection of Fees) Ordinance Cap 543	Ordinance	1998		
Road Traffic (Driving-Offence Points) Ordinance Cap 375	Ordinance	1984	1997, 2008	
Road Traffic Ordinance Cap 374	Ordinance	1984	1988	
Copyright Ordinance Cap.528	Ordinance, copyright protection	1997		UK Copyright Act 1956 still used for items created before 1997
Betting Duty Ordinance Cap.108	Ordinance	2003	2006	replace original Cap.40 of 1931 and revision 1950
Business Registration Ordinance Cap.310	Ordinance	1959	1985	Replaced Cap.6 1959
Hotel Accommodation Tax Ordinance Cap.348	Ordinance, taxation	1966		Replaced Cap.39 1965
Inland Revenue Ordinance Cap.112	Ordinance, establishment of government department	1947	1969, 1989	replaced original Cap.20 1947 and Cap. 112 1950
Stamp Duty Ordinance Cap. 117	Ordinance	1981		replaced Cap.31 1981
Tax Reserve Certificates Ordinance Cap.289	Ordinance, taxation	1955		Replaced Cap.66 1955
Crimes Ordinance Cap.200	Ordinance, criminal law	1897		Replaced Cap.2 1897
Hong Kong Bill of Rights Ordinance	Ordinance, human rights	1991	1997	Replaced Cap.59 1991
Partnership Ordinance Cap.38	Ordinance	1950		
Education Ordinance Cap.279	Ordinance	2000	2004	Education Ordinance (Amendment)
Antiquities and Monuments Ordinance Cap.53	Ordinance, historical preservation	1976		Replaced Antiquities and Monuments Ordinance Cap.64 1971
Colonial Regulation 55			repealed 1997?	
Dutiable Commodities Ordinance Cap.109	Ordinance, taxation	1963	1970, 1974, 1976, 1985, 1986, 1992, 1993	Replaced Cap.26 1963
Dutible Commodities (Liquor) Regulations Cap.109B	Regulation	2000		sub-section to Dutiable Commodities Ordinance Cap.109
Metrication Ordinance Cap.214	Ordinance	1976		Replaced Cap.48 1976
Estate Duty Ordinance Cap.111	Ordinance	1932		replaced Cap.3 1932
Control of Obscene and Indecent Articles Ordinance Cap.390	Ordinance, media restrictions and standards	1987		Replaced Cap.9 1987
Hong Kong Sea Cadets Corps Cap.1134	Ordinance	1984		Originally Cap.75 1983
City University of Hong Kong Ordinance Cap.1132	Ordinance, establishment of post-secondary institution	1984	1994	
Hong Kong Special Administrative Region passport Ordinance Cap.539	Establish the right to create and issue travel document	1997		
Ocean Park Ordinance Cap. 388	Incorporation	1987		Replace cap.35 1987
Hong Kong Peak Tramways Ordinance Cap.265	Authorized the construction of system	1883	1950	Originally Cap.6 1883 and Cap.304 1950
Police Forces (Change of Title) Ordinance	Name change	1969	1997, 1999	Changed from Hong Kong Police Force to Royal Hong Kong Police Force; changed back in 1997
ICAC Ordinance Cap.204	establishment of the ICAC	1974		
Royal Hong Kong Regiment Ordinance Cap.199	Disbandment	1997		Official disbandment of British Forces unit before 1997 handover
Banking Ordinance Cap.155	Regulations	1986	1988, 1997	
Hospital Authority Ordinance Cap.113	Establishment and regulations	1990	1991	
Fire Services Ordinance Cap.95	constitution	1954	1961, 1964, 1971, 2003	
Hong Kong Tramways Ordinance Cap.107	Authorized construction	1902	1911, 1912, 1950	HKT was incorporated in Britain
Post Office Ordinance Cap. 1926	Amendment	1926	1950	change of laws relating the Hong Kong Post Office
High Court Ordinance Cap.4		1976	1998	Related to the pre-1997 Supreme Court, now the High Court
HSBC Limited Ordinance Cap.70	amending constitution of HSBC Limited	1929	1950, 1989	
