= Policy Address =

Annual address by the Chief Executive of Hong Kong

- Traditional Chinese: 施政報告
- Simplified Chinese: 施政报告
Transcriptions
Standard Mandarin
- Hanyu Pinyin: shīzhèngbàogào
Yue: Cantonese
- Jyutping: si1 zing3 bou3 gou3

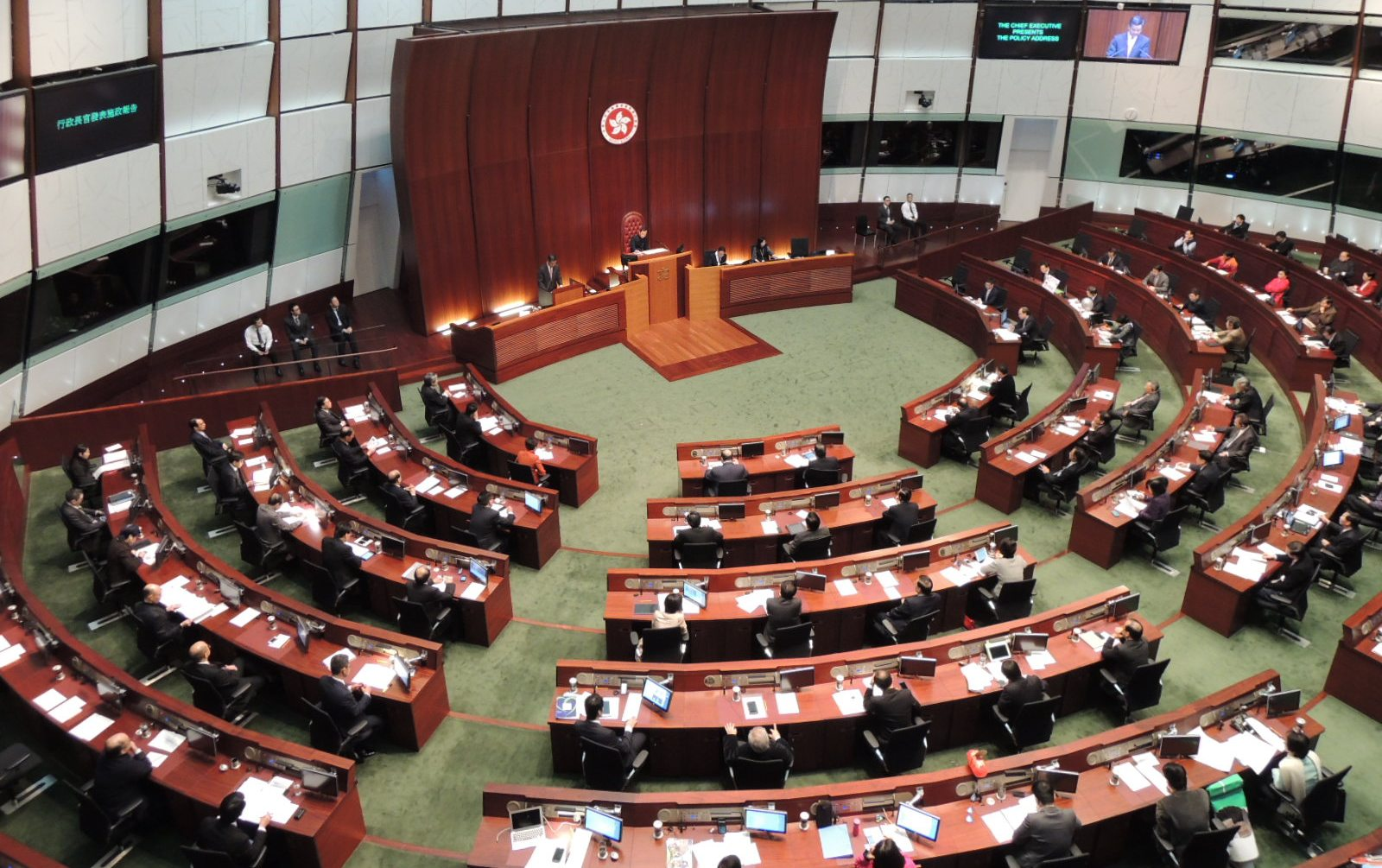
2013 Policy Address debated in Legco

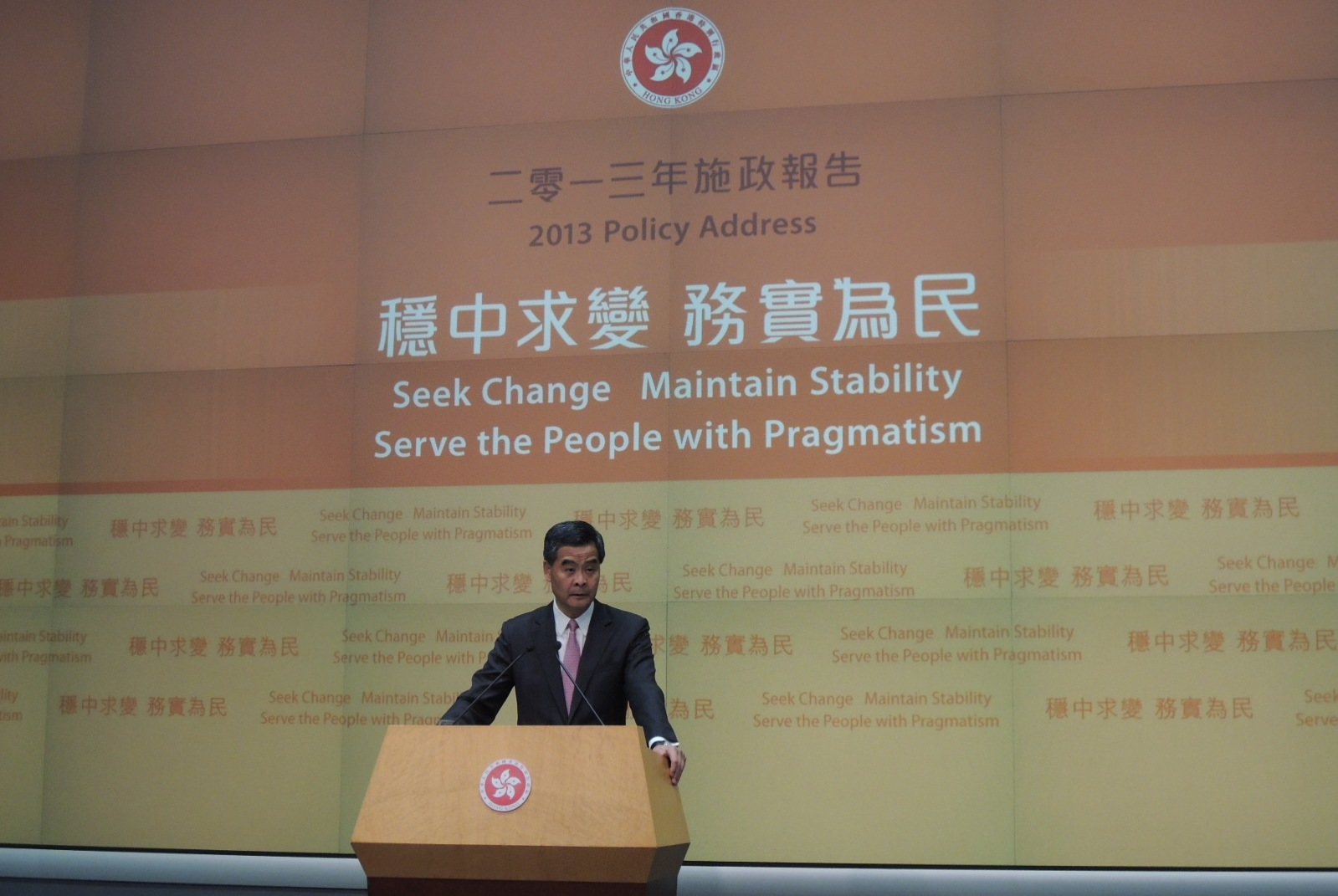
2013 Policy Address by Leung Chun-ying

In Hong Kong, the Policy Address (Chinese: 施政報告) is the constitutionally mandated annual address to the legislature delivered by the Chief Executive. The practice of giving annual Policy Addresses is mandated under Article 64 of the Basic Law, which requires the government to "present regular Policy Addresses to the [Legislative] Council". Many people see the Policy Address as a useful way to predict how the Chief Executive will operate.

== History ==
=== Before 1997 ===
The annual address was first introduced in 1972 by Governor Sir Murray MacLehose during the British rule of Hong Kong, and set out the government's legislative and policy agenda for the coming year. It was called the "Address by the Governor" (Chinese: 港督致辭) and was modelled after the Queen's Speech during the State Opening of Parliament in the United Kingdom. It aimed to strengthen communications with Hong Kong residents after the 1967 Hong Kong riots, and was widely broadcast via television and radio.

Addresses by the Governor took place in October to mark the beginning of the legislative year. The address was renamed to its current Chinese name 施政報告 (lit. 'governance report') in 1986. The English name of the event remained unchanged until the Handover in 1997. Beginning with his first address in 1992, Governor Chris Patten initiated the practice of giving each address a unique title.

In his final annual address, delivered on 2 October 1996, Patten spoke of his anxiety of autonomy being given away "bit by bit" by some in Hong Kong. Observers noted that this line reflected many Hongkongers' greatest fear of efforts to undermine Hong Kong's right to self-government being made not only from outsiders, but also from within.

... my anxiety is not that this community's autonomy would be usurped by Beijing, but that it could be given away bit by bit by some people in Hong Kong... If we in Hong Kong want our autonomy, then it needs to be defended and asserted by everyone here ─ by businessmen, politicians, journalists, academics and other community leaders, as well as by public servants.

— Chris Patten, 1996 Address by the Governor, 94

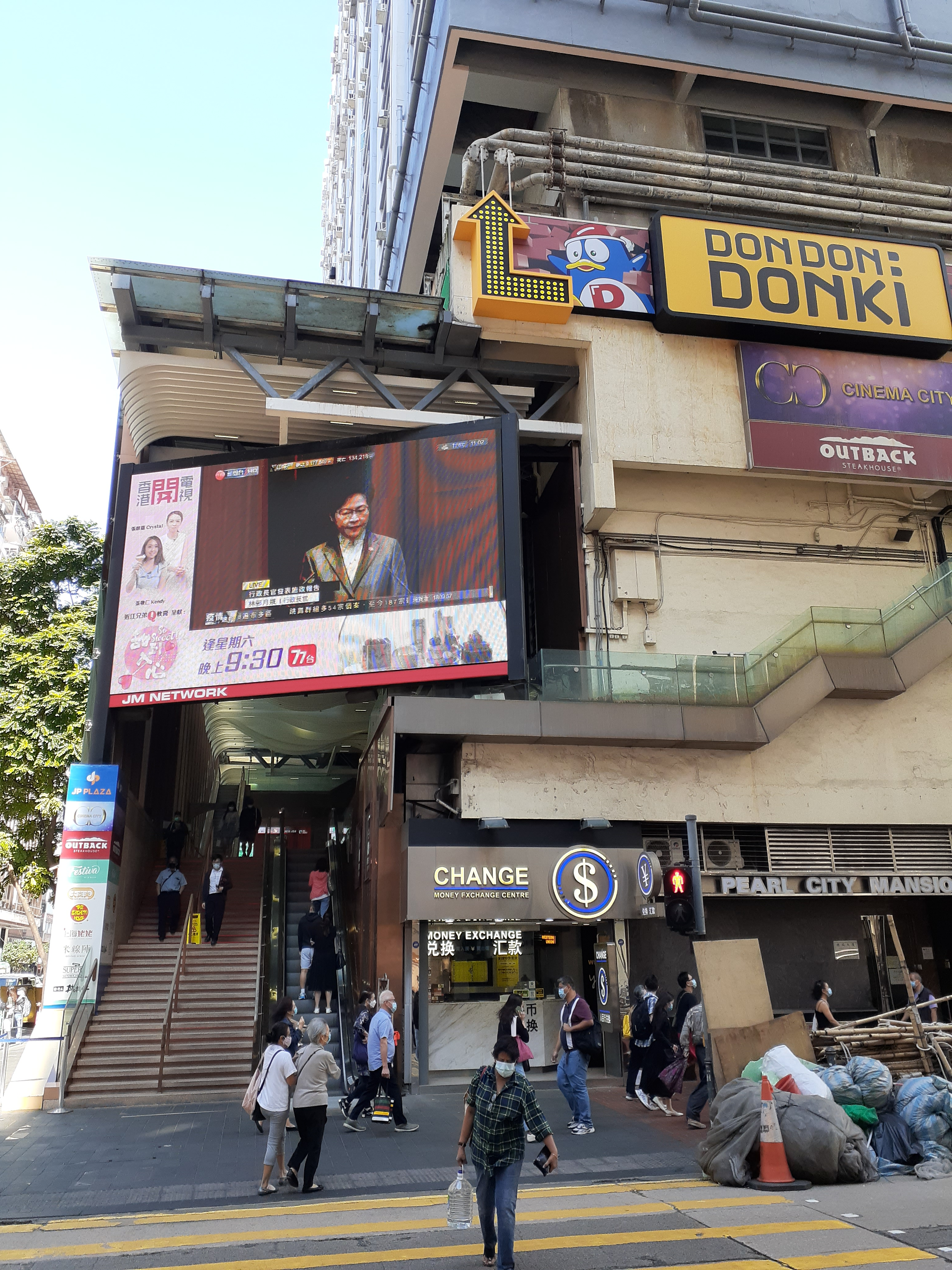
A television broadcast of Carrie Lam's 2020 Policy Address in Causeway Bay

=== After the Handover (1997-present) ===
The Chief Executive can decide in which month of the year to deliver the annual Policy Address. From 1997 to 2001, Tung Chee-hwa delivered Policy Addresses in October as the Legislative Council reconvened. In 2002, after his re-election as Chief Executive, Tung rescheduled the October 2002 address to January 2003, ostensibly to allow the newly appointed ministers under the Principal Officials Accountability System to settle into their roles. As a result, no policy address was delivered in 2002. Tung continued to deliver his addresses in January until he resigned in March 2005.

Tung's successor Donald Tsang resumed the previous practice of giving the speech in October; as such, there were two Policy Addresses in 2005. Leung Chun-ying pushed back his Policy Addresses to January, explaining the move by stating that he wished to give lawmakers more time to voice their opinions.

Carrie Lam delivered her Policy Addresses in October, except in 2020, which was rescheduled to 25 November to avoid clashing with CCP General Secretary Xi Jinping's visit to Shenzhen. John Lee, who took office in 2022, has delivered his Policy Addresses in October.

== Contemporary practice ==
=== Public consultation ===
The government typically launches a public consultation campaign three to four months before the delivery of the address.

=== Motion of thanks ===
Within 14 days after the delivery of the address, the Chairman of the House Committee of the Legislative Council will move a Motion of Thanks, similar to Address in Reply motions in other legislatures, and members of the Council debate the Policy Address.

== List of policy addresses ==
Year	Given by	English title	Chinese title
2026	John Lee	A Strategic Vision for a Bright New Era; Driving Reform and Boosting Development; Unleashing Opportunities and Enhancing Livelihood	以長遠謀全局 以改革開新篇 促發展創機遇 惠民生向未來
2025	John Lee	Deepening Reforms for Our People; Leveraging Our Strengths for a Brighter Future	深化改革 心繫民生 發揮優勢 同創未來
2024	John Lee	Reform for Enhancing Development and Building Our Future Together	齊改革同發展 惠民生建未來
2023	John Lee	A Vibrant Economy for a Caring Community	拼經濟謀發展 惠民生添幸福
2022	John Lee	Charting a Brighter Tomorrow for Hong Kong	為市民謀幸福 為香港謀發展
2021	Carrie Lam	Building a Bright Future Together	齊心同行 開創未來
2020	Carrie Lam	Striving Ahead with Renewed Perseverance	砥礪前行 重新出發
2019	Carrie Lam	Treasure Hong Kong: Our Home	珍惜香港 共建家園
2018	Carrie Lam	Striving Ahead, Rekindling Hope	堅定前行 燃點希望
2017	Carrie Lam	We Connect for Hope and Happiness	一起同行 擁抱希望 分享快樂
2017	Leung Chun-ying	Make Best Use of Opportunities; Develop the Economy; Improve People’s Livelihood; Build an Inclusive Society	用好機遇 發展經濟 改善民生 和諧共融
2016	Leung Chun-ying	Innovate for the Economy; Improve Livelihood; Foster Harmony; Share Prosperity	創新經濟 改善民生 促進和諧 繁榮共享
2015	Leung Chun-ying	Uphold the Rule of Law; Seize the Opportunities; Make the Right Choices	重法治 掌機遇 作抉擇
2014	Leung Chun-ying	Support the Needy; Let Youth Flourish; Unleash Hong Kong's Potential	讓有需要的 得到支援 讓年青的 各展所長 讓香港 得以發揮
2013	Leung Chun-ying	Seek Change; Maintain Stability; Serve the People with Pragmatism	穩中求變 務實為民
2011–12	Donald Tsang	From Strength to Strength	繼往開來
2010–11	Donald Tsang	Sharing Prosperity for a Caring Society	民心我心 同舟共濟 繁榮共享
2009–10	Donald Tsang	Breaking New Ground Together	羣策創新天
2008–09	Donald Tsang	Embracing New Challenges	迎接新挑戰
2007–08	Donald Tsang	A New Direction for Hong Kong	香港新方向
2006–07	Donald Tsang	Proactive; Pragmatic; Always People First	以民為本 務實進取
2005–06	Donald Tsang	Strong Governance For the People	強政勵治 福為民開
2005	Tung Chee-hwa	Working Together for Economic Development and Social Harmony	合力發展經濟 共建和諧社會
2004	Tung Chee-hwa	Seizing Opportunities for Development; Promoting People-based Governance	把握發展機遇 推動民本施政
2003	Tung Chee-hwa	Capitalising on Our Advantages Revitalising Our Economy	善用香港優勢 共同振興經濟
2001	Tung Chee-hwa	Building on our Strengths; Investing in our Future	鞏固實力 投資未來
2000	Tung Chee-hwa	Serving the Community; Sharing Common Goals	以民為本 同心同德
1999	Tung Chee-hwa	Quality People; Quality Home	培育優秀人才 建設美好家園
1998	Tung Chee-hwa	From Adversity to Opportunity	羣策羣力 轉危為機
1997	Tung Chee-hwa	Building Hong Kong For A New Era	共創香港新紀元
1996	Chris Patten	Hong Kong: Transition	過渡中的香港
1995	Chris Patten	Hong Kong: Our Work Together	同心協力建香港
1994	Chris Patten	Hong Kong: A Thousand Days and Beyond	香港：掌握千日 跨越九七
1993	Chris Patten	Hong Kong: Today's Success, Tomorrow's Challenges	香港：立基今日 開拓明天
1992	Chris Patten	Our Next Five Years: The Agenda for Hong Kong	香港的未來：五年大計展新猷

There were no titles for the Policy Addresses before 1992.

== See also ==
- State of the Union
- State Opening of Parliament
- Speech from the throne
