= Secretary for Development =

Hong Kong Special Administrative Region Secretary for Development 發展局局長
- Emblem of Hong Kong

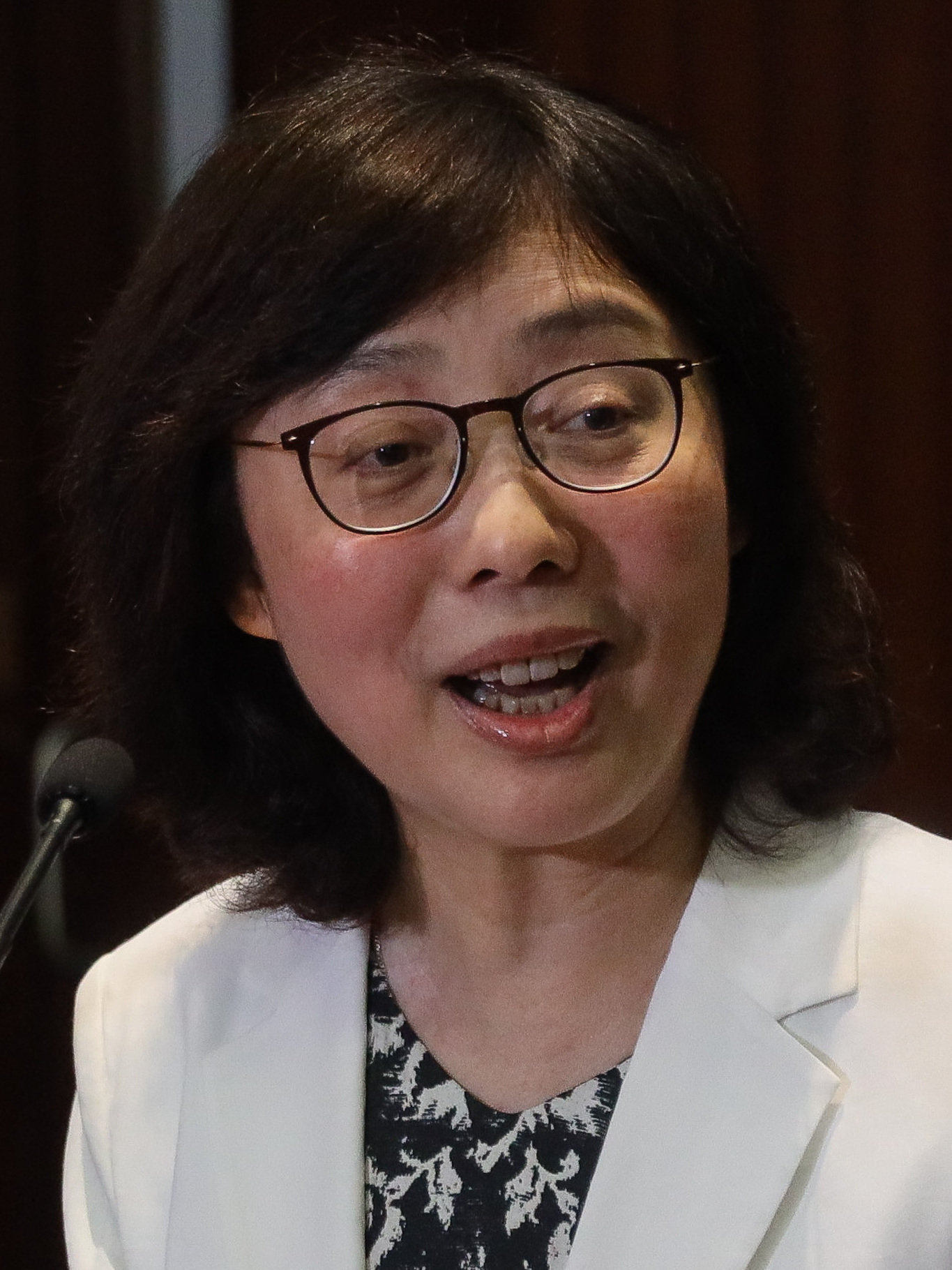
- Incumbent; Bernadette Linn since 1 July 2022
- Development Bureau
- Style: The Honourable
- Appointer: Central People's Government nomination by Chief Executive
- Inaugural holder: Alexander T. Gordon; Surveyor General (1842); Carrie Lam; Secretary for Development
- Formation: 21 January 1999; 1 July 2007
- Salary: HK$4,021,200 per annum
- Website: DEVB

Secretary for Development
- Traditional Chinese: 發展局局長
Transcriptions
Yue: Cantonese
- Yale Romanization: Faat jín guhk guhk jéung
- Jyutping: Faat^{3} zin^{2} guk^{6} guk^{6} zoeng^{2}

The Secretary for Development of the Hong Kong Government is responsible for planning, land development and public works related development policy in Hong Kong. The position was created in 2007 to replace portions of the previous portfolios of Secretary for the Environment, Transport and Works and Secretary for Housing, Planning and Lands.

== List of office holders ==
Political party: Nonpartisan

=== Surveyor General, 1842–1891 ===
No.	Portrait	Name	Term of office		Governor	Ref
1		Alexander T. Gordon 歌頓	1842	1845	Sir Henry Pottinger (1841–1843); Administrator	
1		Alexander T. Gordon 歌頓	1842	1845	Sir Henry Pottinger (1843–1844)	
1		Alexander T. Gordon 歌頓	1842	1845	Sir John Francis Davis (1844–1848)	
2		Charles St George Cleverly 急庇利	1845	1865	Sir John Francis Davis (1844–1848)	
2		Charles St George Cleverly 急庇利	1845	1865	Sir George Bonham (1848–1854)	
2		Charles St George Cleverly 急庇利	1845	1865	Sir John Bowring (1854–1859)	
2		Charles St George Cleverly 急庇利	1845	1865	Sir Hercules Robinson (1859–1865)	
3		Wilberforce Wilson 衛信	1865	1869	Sir Hercules Robinson (1859–1865)	
3		Wilberforce Wilson 衛信	1865	1869	Sir Richard Graves MacDonnell (1866–1872)	
4		Lewis Henry Moorsom 睦誠	1869	1873	Sir Richard Graves MacDonnell (1866–1872)	
4		Lewis Henry Moorsom 睦誠	1869	1873	Sir Arthur Kennedy (1872–1877)	
5		John MacNeile Price 裴樂士	1873	1889	Sir Arthur Kennedy (1872–1877)	
5		John MacNeile Price 裴樂士	1873	1889	Sir John Pope Hennessy (1877–1882)	
5		John MacNeile Price 裴樂士	1873	1889	Sir George Bowen (1883–1885)	
5		John MacNeile Price 裴樂士	1873	1889	Sir William Des Voeux (1887–1891)	
6		Samuel Brown 布朗	1889	1891	Sir William Des Voeux (1887–1891)	
6		Samuel Brown 布朗	1889	1891	Sir William Robinson (1891–1898)	

=== Directors of Public Works, 1891–1941 ===
No.	Portrait	Name	Term of office		Governor	Ref
1		Francis Alfred Cooper 谷柏	10 October 1891	1897	Sir William Robinson (1891–1898)	
2		Robert Daly Ormsby 安庶庇	21 October 1897	1901	Sir William Robinson (1891–1898)	
2		Robert Daly Ormsby 安庶庇	21 October 1897	1901	Sir Henry Arthur Blake (1898–1903)	
3		William Chatham 漆咸	12 October 1901	1921	Sir Henry Arthur Blake (1898–1903)	
3		William Chatham 漆咸	12 October 1901	1921	Sir Matthew Nathan (1904–1907)	
3		William Chatham 漆咸	12 October 1901	1921	Sir Frederick Lugard (1907–1912)	
3		William Chatham 漆咸	12 October 1901	1921	Sir Francis Henry May (1912–1918)	
3		William Chatham 漆咸	12 October 1901	1921	Sir Reginald Edward Stubbs (1919–1925)	
4		Thomas Luff Perkins 白健時	1 July 1921	1923	Sir Reginald Edward Stubbs (1919–1925)	
5		Harold Thomas Creasy 祈禮士	30 August 1923	1932	Sir Reginald Edward Stubbs (1919–1925)	
5		Harold Thomas Creasy 祈禮士	30 August 1923	1932	Sir Cecil Clementi (1925–1930)	
5		Harold Thomas Creasy 祈禮士	30 August 1923	1932	Sir William Peel (1930–1935)	
6		Richard McNeil Henderson 軒德蓀	12 December 1932	1939	Sir William Peel (1930–1935)	
6		Richard McNeil Henderson 軒德蓀	12 December 1932	1939	Sir Andrew Caldecott (1935–1937)	
6		Richard McNeil Henderson 軒德蓀	12 December 1932	1939	Sir Geoffry Northcote (1937–1941)	
7		Alexander Bruce Purves 包華士	28 September 1939	25 December 1941	Sir Geoffry Northcote (1937–1941)	
7		Alexander Bruce Purves 包華士	28 September 1939	25 December 1941	Mark Aitchison Young (1941)	

=== Directors of Public Works, 1946–1981 ===
No.	Portrait	Name	Term of office		Governor	Ref
-		Harold Stuart Rouse	7 September 1945	1946	Military administration	
8		Victor Kenneth Kenniff	15 May 1946	1949	Sir Mark Aitchison Young (1946–1947)	
8		Victor Kenneth Kenniff	15 May 1946	1949	Sir Alexander Grantham (1947–1957)	
9		Edward Audley Boyce	26 August 1949	1950	Sir Alexander Grantham (1947–1957)	
10		Theodore Louis Bowring 包寧	5 December 1950	1957	Sir Alexander Grantham (1947–1957)	
11		Allan Inglis 英格理	22 May 1957	28 February 1963	Sir Alexander Grantham (1947–1957)	
11		Allan Inglis 英格理	22 May 1957	28 February 1963	Sir Robert Brown Black (1958–1964)	
12		Alec Michael John Wright 鄔勵德	7 March 1963	27 March 1969	Sir Robert Brown Black (1958–1964)	
12		Alec Michael John Wright 鄔勵德	7 March 1963	27 March 1969	Sir David Trench (1964–1971)	
13		James Jeavons Robson 盧秉信	28 March 1969	August 1973	Sir David Trench (1964–1971)	
13		James Jeavons Robson 盧秉信	28 March 1969	August 1973	Sir Murray MacLehose (1971–1982)	
14		David Wylie McDonald 麥德霖	February 1974	1981	Sir Murray MacLehose (1971–1982)	

Development issues were handled by Secretary for Lands and Works between 1981 and 1989.

=== Secretaries for Works, 1989–1997 ===
№	Portrait	Name	Term of office		Governor	Ref
1		Kenneth Kwok 郭偉階	1 September 1989	31 March 1992	Sir David Wilson (1987–1992)	
2		Ronald James Blake 詹伯樂	1 April 1992	May 1995	Sir David Wilson (1987–1992)	
2		Ronald James Blake 詹伯樂	1 April 1992	May 1995	Chris Patten (1992–1997)	
3		Kwong Hon-sang 鄺漢生	15 May 1995	30 June 1997	Chris Patten (1992–1997)	

=== Secretaries for Works, 1997–2002 ===
No.	Portrait	Name	Term of office		Duration	Chief Executive	Term	Ref
1		Kwong Hon-sang 鄺漢生	1 July 1997	6 August 1999	1 year, 37 days	Tung Chee-hwa (1997–2005)	1	
2		Lee Shing-see 李承仕	7 August 1999	30 June 2002	2 years, 328 days	Tung Chee-hwa (1997–2005)	1	

Development issues were handled by Secretary for the Environment, Transport and Works between 2002 and 2007.

=== Secretaries for Development, 2007–present ===
No.	Portrait	Name	Term of office		Duration	Chief Executive	Term	Ref
1		Carrie Lam Cheng Yuet-ngor 林鄭月娥	1 July 2007	30 June 2012	5 years, 0 days	Donald Tsang (2005–2012)	3	
2		Mak Chai-kwong 麥齊光	1 July 2012	12 July 2012	11 days	Leung Chun-ying (2012–2017)	4	
3		Paul Chan Mo-po 陳茂波	30 July 2012	16 January 2017	4 years, 170 days	Leung Chun-ying (2012–2017)	4	
4		Eric Ma Siu-cheung 馬紹祥	13 February 2017	30 June 2017	138 days	Leung Chun-ying (2012–2017)	4	
5		Michael Wong Wai-lun 黃偉綸	1 July 2017	30 June 2022	5 years, 0 days	Carrie Lam (2017–2022)	5	
6		Bernadette Linn Hon-ho 甯漢豪	1 July 2022	Incumbent	4 years, 69 days	John Lee (2022–present)	6	

== See also ==
- Public Works Department (Hong Kong)
- Antiquities Authority, Hong Kong
