= Transport and Housing Bureau =

Former agency of the Hong Kong government

- 運輸及房屋局
- Emblem of the Hong Kong SAR

Agency overview
- Formed: 2007
- Preceding agencies: Environment, Transport and Works Bureau; Housing, Planning and Lands Bureau
- Dissolved: 30 June 2022
- Superseding agencies: Transport and Logistics Bureau; Housing Bureau
- Headquarters: 22/F, East Wing, Central Government Offices, 2 Tim Mei Avenue, Tamar, Hong Kong
- Minister responsible: Frank Chan, Secretary for Transport and Housing
- Deputy Minister responsible: Raymond So, Under Secretary for Transport and Housing
- Agency executives: Mable Chan, Permanent Secretary for Transport and Housing (Transport); Agnes Wong, Permanent Secretary for Transport and Housing (Housing)/Director of Housing
- Child agencies: Transport Department; Housing Department / Housing Authority; Civil Aviation Department; Marine Department; Highways Department
- Website: |www.thb.gov.hk/

Transport and Housing Bureau
- Traditional Chinese: 運輸及房屋局
- Simplified Chinese: 运输及房屋局
Transcriptions
Standard Mandarin
- Hanyu Pinyin: Yun4 shu1 ji2 fang2 wu1 ju2
Yue: Cantonese
- Yale Romanization: Wahn syū kahp fòhng ngūk guhk
- Jyutping: Wan6 syu1 kap6 fong4 nguk1 guk6

The Transport and Housing Bureau (THB) was a policy bureau of the Government of Hong Kong between 2007 and 2022, responsible for a range of policies such as the internal and external transportation, including air transport, land transport, maritime transport, logistics and housing development in Hong Kong. The bureau was headed by the Secretary for Transport and Housing (STH).

The bureau was formed on 1 July 2007 to take over the transport portfolios previously under the purview of the Environment, Transport and Works Bureau, and the public housing portfolios of the Housing, Planning and Lands Bureau. On 1 July 2022, the THB was split up into the Transport and Logistics Bureau (TLB) and the Housing Bureau.

== Subordinate entities ==
The bureau was divided into two branches, the Transport Branch and the Housing Branch. The following public entities are controlled by the bureau:

=== Transport ===
- Land and Waterborne Transport
- Air Services
- Maritime Transport
- Logistics Development

=== Housing ===
- Housing Authority / Housing Department
- Appeal Panel (Housing)
- Estate Agents Authority
- Appeal Panel (Estate Agents Ordinance)
- Housing Managers Registration Board

== See also ==
- Airport Authority Hong Kong
- MTR Corporation
- Hong Kong Maritime and Port Board
