= 2007 CUHK student newspaper pornographic section incident =

2007 scandal involving a CUHK student newspaper

- Date: May 6, 2007–October 21, 2008
- Location: Hong Kong
- Cause: The CUHK Student Newspaper faced controversy due to complaints about its "pornographic section."
- Motive: Support the "erotic version" side: Defend free speech and academic freedom Make sexual discourse more diverse Oppose authority and conservatism Protect the right to discuss taboos
- Target: Those who support the "pornographic version": request the film and television industry to rule that "CUHK Student Newspaper" is not obscene or indecent and retain the "pornographic version"; Opponents of the "pornographic version": Ban the "pornographic version" and publicly apologize to all teachers and students of CUHK
- Outcome: After discussion, the school decided not to punish anyone.; High Court Judge Lam Man-han ruled in favor of the CUHK Student Newspaper and Ming Pao and withdrew the provisional rating

The 2007 CUHK student newspaper pornographic section incident refers to a series of incidents that occurred in May 2007 when the CUHK Student Newspaper, a newspaper owned by the Chinese University of Hong Kong Students' Union, was reported by newspapers for its "pornographic section." The incident mainly focused on students' attitudes towards sex, the handling and educational methods of the Chinese University of Hong Kong, freedom of the press, and freedom of speech. In addition to affecting the subsequent publication of the CUHK Student Newspaper, this incident also involved the next Hong Kong Internet culture and self-censorship of newspapers. It prompted the Hong Kong Special Administrative Region government to implement the "Control of Obscene and Indecent Articles Ordinance" review.

Since 1987, Hong Kong has implemented the Control of Obscene and Indecent Articles Ordinance, which regulates "articles whose contents are or contain obscene or indecent. Material (including violent, corrupt or objectionable material)" and enacted Relevant penalties. On May 6, 2007, two students from the School of Divinity of CUHK, Huang Dawei and Feng Zizhao, complained to significant newspapers about the pornographic content of the CUHK Student Newspaper. The next day, three newspapers accused the CUHK Student Newspaper of immoral and inappropriate content. It is too explicit and criticizes the moral education of today's universities. On May 8, significant media also began to focus on this incident, and the focus shifted to the February 2007 issue of the questionnaire because some of the questions related to incest and bestiality which touched social taboos on sex. As a result, the relevant content has aroused discussion and controversy from all walks of life, and the Film, Television, and Entertainment Licensing Authority has also received many complaints from citizens. The school convened an adjudication panel on the incident on May 10; the CUHK Student Newspaper editorial board decided to boycott it because the school rejected their request.

On the same day, the editorial board of CUHK Student News held the first forum to explain to the public. I also responded to questions from the audience. At the end of the first forum, the school issued a warning letter to the editorial board and demanded that the CUHK Student Newspaper stop publishing. The CUHK Student Newspaper in May was just a delayed project publication. In addition, the CUHK Student Newspaper involved that day was also included in the Obscenity and Indecent Tribunal (in the future referred to as the Obscenity Tribunal) for review. After 1 to 2 days, the preliminary review was evaluated as "indecent." In recent years, voices supporting the CUHK Student Newspaper have begun to appear in society, claiming that the tribunal or the school's actions violate academic freedom or freedom of the press. However, opposing voices also believe that the CUHK Student Newspaper is unethical and vulgar. Later, they held a second forum at Sai Yeung Choi Street in Mong Kok, which attracted about 300 favorable opponents. At the meeting, they admitted that they had shortcomings due to the incident but still adhered to the concepts and truth of handling the investigation. Correct. In addition, the editorial board of the CUHK Student Newspaper also attended the live broadcast to discuss the incident.

The February and March issues of the CUHK Student Newspaper and the January and February issues of the online version were tentatively designated as "indecent" on May 15, which attracted netizens to protest by complaining about classic works. Ming Pao also issued a temporary indecent rating on May 22 for citing the pornographic sections of "China" and "Student News" for discussion. After discussing the follow-up work with the school, the CUHK Student Newspaper editorial board submitted a review request to the Eastern District Court. Ming Pao also raised the issue after tentatively commenting on the indecent nature, and the relevant hearing was launched on July 6. The case was later transferred to the High Court for a hearing because the lawyer representing the CUHK Student Newspaper claimed that the hearing method of the Obscenity Tribunal was illegal and illegal. The High Court made a rating on October 21 of the following year, ruling that CUHK Student Newspaper and Ming Pao won the lawsuit, withdrew the tentative rating, and did not need to re-rating. The CUHK campus also decided to punish anyone involved after a discussion. However, it refused to withdraw the warning letter issued to the editorial board after the court imposed a higher penalty.

== Event background ==
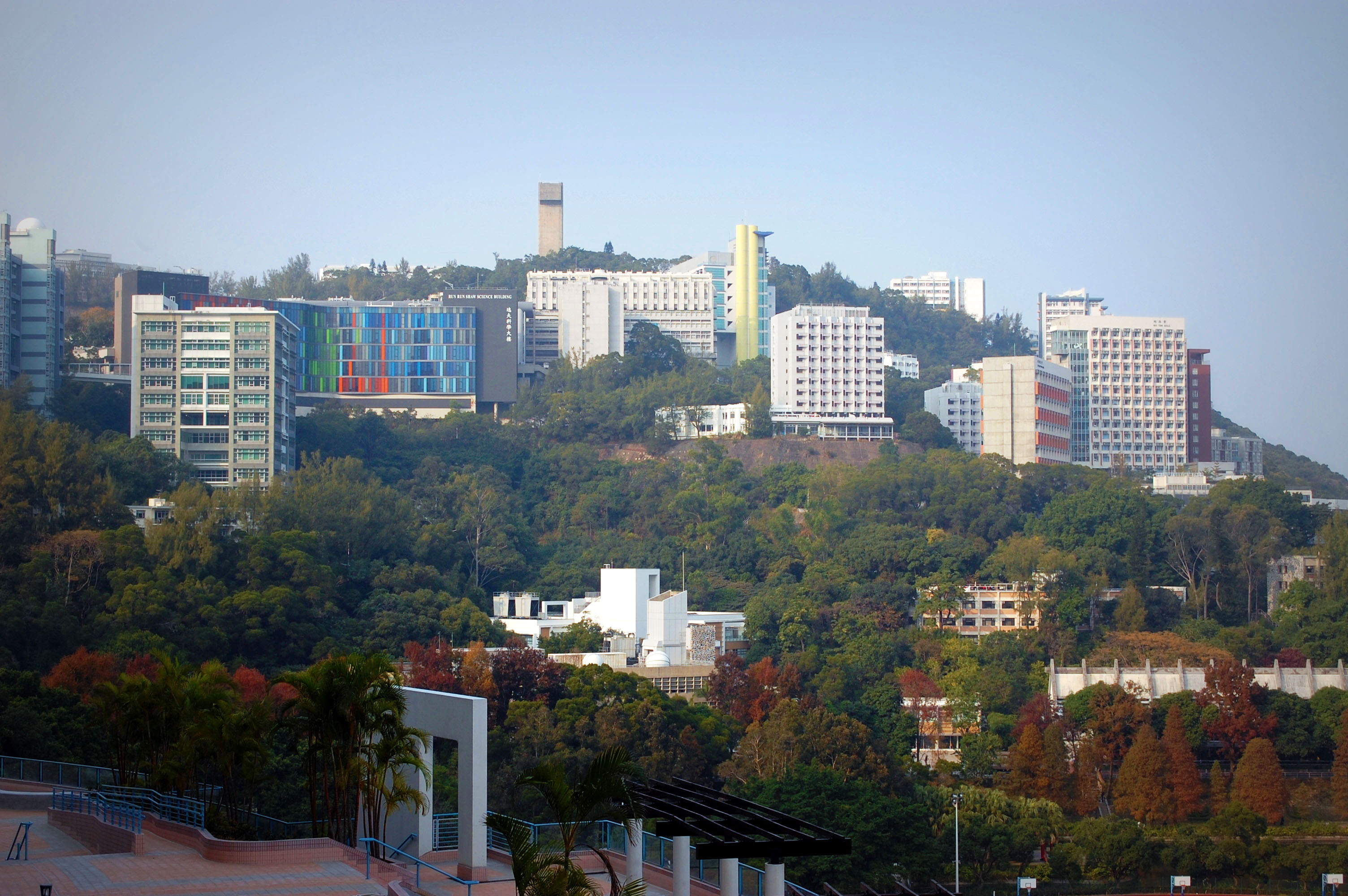
Chinese University of Hong Kong

CUHK Student Newspaper is a publication for students of The Chinese University of Hong Kong. It added an erotic section in December 2006, with content focusing on various sexual issues, including sexual stories, sexual concept surveys, sexual mailboxes, etc.

Since 1987, Hong Kong has implemented the Control of Obscene and Indecent Articles Ordinance, which regulates "articles whose content is or contains obscene or indecent material (including violent, corrupt or objectionable material)," among which The determination of obscene or indecent articles is left to a panel of adjudicators (comprising a magistrate and two or more adjudicators) based on factors such as "moral standards of etiquette generally accepted by members of the community." After the first ruling, a tentative category will be assigned to the relevant items, and 5 days will be given for the submitter to submit a review request. Items rated as indecent cannot be posted to people under the age of 18, and are subject to certain restrictions when posted to people over the age of 18; items rated as obscene cannot be posted to anyone. According to the law, regardless of whether a person knows whether an article is indecent or not, as long as a person actually publishes such an article to a person under the age of 18, it is illegal.

== Newspaper reports ==
On May 6, 2007, Sing Tao Daily, Oriental Daily, and Ming Pao received complaints from CUHK Divinity School students Huang Dawei and Feng Zizhao and accused the CUHK Student News of "pornographic sections" in the next day's newspapers. "The content is immoral and excessively explicit, and it is used to criticize the moral education of today's universities. However, neither the CUHK Representative Council nor the CUHK Student News received any complaints in advance. On May 8, significant media also began to focus on this incident and focused on the questionnaire about fantasizing about incest sex and bestiality.

=== Disputed content ===
See also: Incest § Consensual adults and zoophilia § Debates about zoophilia or related behaviors

Newspapers such as Sing Tao Daily initially criticized the sex stories and questionnaire questions in the erotic pages, saying that the content describing women's sexual fantasies was immoral. Subsequent newspaper attention focused on the questionnaire questions in the February 2007 issue.

The February 2007 issue of the questionnaire included 14 questions about sex, including sexual fantasies during masturbation and feelings during sexual intercourse. Among them, issues related to incest and bestiality have stirred up public opinion the most, because they touch upon social taboos on sex. It asked: "Have you ever fantasized about having sex with your parents, brothers and sisters? (You can also have fantasies when you were a child or now!) ," (continued) "Have you ever peeked at them bathing, changing clothes, masturbating, Make love? ," "What animal do you most want to have sex with? ," the relevant survey results were published in the March issue. Karen Ng, the executive editor of the February issue, said that the questions were "co-conceived by the editors, hoping to understand what types of sexual issues students are most interested in." In addition, he responded to the criticism that the answers to the sex mailbox lacked academic authority, referring to sex. It is not necessary that only professionals can analyze it.

== Expansion of public opinion ==
On May 7, the day the first batch of reports were published, the Television and Entertainment Licensing Authority received the first relevant complaint. By the next day, a total of 7 complaints had been received and decided Submit for inspection. The relevant figures later expanded to 116 cases on May 15. In the first few days, public opinion tended to criticize the relevant content of the CUHK Student Newspaper. For example, 53 students signed a petition during the period, demanding that the CUHK Student Newspaper publicly apologize to all teachers and students, and demanded that the newspaper be returned. The amount paid by itself to the CUHK Student Newspaper to support its operations.

The school issued a statement on May 7, stating that "the school requires students to have high character and moral integrity... and will never allow students to publish publications in an indecent and pornographic manner." The next day, the CUHK Student Newspaper published its first headline and a statement "Researching Authenticity Without Fear of Stigma." The statement stated: "The purpose of creating the erotic page is to criticize the one-line and distorted erotic imagination in today's society and create an open The space for discussing sex and desire is in line with the tradition of this newspaper." However, on May 9, 300 copies of the issue were vandalized and discarded in the recycling bin, and major newspapers also used the CUHK Student Newspaper The editorial board refused to publish a large-scale report on the apology. On the same day, Oriental Daily quoted Ye Xingguo, chairman of the Association of Adjudicators of Obscene and Indecent Articles, as saying that there is a high chance that pornographic sections will be rated as "indecent."

=== Convene an adjudication panel ===
The school convened an adjudication panel on the incident on May 10. The members included four professors and one student, and invited the then and former editor-in-chief of the CUHK Student Newspaper to attend. The editorial board of the student newspaper decided to boycott the school because the school refused to "hope that all officials should attend the adjudication panel" and demonstrated outside the administration building. The adjudication panel concluded that the pornographic version "exceeded the moral bottom line acceptable to society, and the content was indecent and disturbing" and handed it over to the disciplinary committee.

=== First forum ===
On the same day, the editorial board of the CUHK Student Newspaper held the first forum "How do we express sex" at the Beacon Tower on the CUHK campus, and invited more enlightened scholars such as Liang Biqi, Cao Wenjie, and Huang Huizhen to speak at the forum. There is also a Q&A session from the audience. However, none of the invited school authorities, Society for Truth and Light, and Hong Kong Professional Teachers' Union Association attended. Mingguang Society stated that it only learned on May 9 that it was the only one on the invitation list who had an opposing stance. Therefore, it questioned the students' motives as they just wanted to find people with similar stances to support them and lacked sincerity, so they refused to attend.

The editorial board reiterated its position at the forum: "The purpose of the erotic edition... is to criticize the one-line and distorted erotic imagination in today's society." They also accused the school, the public, and the obscenity tribunal of improper handling methods, and still judged before trial. Discussions of sexology are prohibited. In addition, he also believes that the school's disciplinary committee selection process is not transparent. Together with the scholars present, they also criticized the Hong Kong media for its double standards - they were only allowed to publish pornographic content in their own newspapers, but student newspapers were not allowed to publish the same. The editorial board members also stated that if they were sued, they would appeal. They later responded to the difference between its content and a previous host's question on the radio, "Which female artist do you most want to molest?," saying that the former was an open-ended question, while the latter was a question by name. Later, an audience member asked in English whether the editorial board of the student newspaper would apologize for this. The editorial board said that since they had done nothing wrong, they would not apologize.

After the forum, the CUHK campus radio station also made a recording available for the public to download. In addition, netizens also uploaded video clips of the forum that day to YouTube.

=== School warning ===
Near the end of the first forum, Wu Shupei, Acting Provost of the Chinese University of Hong Kong Academic Affairs Council, issued 12 warning letters to all members of the current and previous editorial committees, stating that all members must be responsible for this, and ordered students to stop publishing CUHK Student Newspaper, and said that the relevant content exceeded the moral bottom line of society and harmed the reputation of the school. In addition, Ma Lizhuang, chairman of the Student Disciplinary Committee of the Academic Affairs Council, also issued a warning letter, stating in the letter that he would consider disciplinary action against the students concerned. The CUHK Student Newspaper criticized that before the disciplinary committee held a hearing, the editorial board had received a warning letter from the school, and it was still "punishment before trial." On May 12, CUHK President Lawrence Lau criticized the CUHK Student Newspaper for the first time, saying that it had affected "the reputation and image of CUHK" and expressed the hope that students would reflect on their behavior.

The subsequent May issue of CUHK Student Newspaper was only postponed until the end of the month and was not published at the request of the school. The erotic edition of the May issue has 3 pages, including the "Stephy Mailbox" to answer sexual questions and erotic novels.

=== Sent to review ===
The CUHK Student Newspaper was also sent to the Obscenity Trial Division for review on May 10. It was initially rated as "indecent" 1–2 days later. Editor-in-Chief Tsang Chiu-wai criticized the Office of Obscenity Review's general practice of reviewing the entire newspaper before rating it. However, when reviewing the CUHK Student Newspaper, the review committee members of the Office of Obscenity Review only read the pornographic sections before making a rating, so he requested it to re-evaluate the CUHK Student Newspaper. However, both Ye Xingguo and the adjudicator of the Obscenity Tribunal, Zhang Minbing, countered that they only need to read the content complained of when reviewing, and they do not need to read the entire newspaper.

=== Public opinion turns ===
In the following half month, voices began to appear in society that supported the CUHK Student Newspaper or criticized the school's practices. However, conservative religious figures and critics of the student newspaper still united to form an anti-CUHK Student Newspaper voice.

Amnesty International Hong Kong Chapter, University Teachers and Students Monitoring Unscrupulous Enterprises, Autonomous Eighth Floor, CUHK Alumni Concern Group, Hong Kong Federation of Students Association, Civil Human Rights Front, etc. issued statements respectively in support of the CUHK Student Newspaper, Refers to school practices that violate academic freedom or freedom of the press. In addition, various departments within CUHK, the public, and many previous editors of the Student Newspaper also launched joint statements to support the CUHK Student Newspaper.

The statement from Amnesty International Hong Kong Chapter states that freedom of the press is the cornerstone of a democratic and open society, and lists the protections afforded to freedom of the press by relevant international and Hong Kong human rights laws. In order to avoid endangering the public's freedom to exercise these rights, the Chinese University of Hong Kong is urged to withdraw the ruling issued against the CUHK Student Newspaper. The academic community has also launched a joint signature campaign to support the CUHK Student Newspaper. It was initiated by a group of "tertiary teachers, staff, graduate students, and students," expressing concerns about the tightening of academic and speech space, and questioning "the impartiality of the tribunal." and objectivity", and stated that many subjects in universities involve "controversial issues."

In addition, the CUHK campus radio station also issued a statement on the same day, expressing its support for students to continue to improve, criticizing the improper reporting methods of the media, and urging the tribunal to make a fair decision on a fair and open platform through public hearings. The Hong Kong Federation of Post-secondary Students and the student unions of six universities issued a statement on "Awakening Social Conscience and Defending Academic Freedom" in support of the concept of the pornographic version of the CUHK Student Newspaper and believed that the tribunal's decision hindered freedom of speech and academic freedom. He also urged the Department of Justice to exempt him from criminal liability on the premise of academic freedom, and requested the Chinese University of Hong Kong to withdraw the punishment against the student.

In terms of opposing voices, there is an online signature campaign called "Have the courage to admit mistakes and make amends - please ask the editorial board of the CUHK Student Newspaper to find out where it went astray." As of 1 pm on May 16, Hong Kong time, 4,497 people had signed, including 1,141 CUHK students and alumni, and 2,533 members of the public. The statement stated that it solemnly requires the members of the editorial board of the student newspaper to "publicly apologize to the teachers, students and alumni of CUHK, suspend the publication of the pornographic section, convene a general meeting of CUHK students, and comprehensively consult students on their opinions on this incident," and "especially be open-minded and open-minded" Listen to the arguments and feelings of some of the opponents". The Christian News, Sing Tao Daily on May 16, and Ta Kung Pao the next day also published a full-page open letter signed by another group of "really vulnerable Hong Kong citizens and CUHK students," with the statement "Relentless Criticizing the 'erotic version' for its low-level obscenity, excessive writing, and the editorial board's use of freedom of speech to confuse the public," and objected to it on the grounds that the content lacked academic value and the style was vulgar. Lin Ziling, the director-general of New Christian News, believes that students do not understand that taboos and morals are established to protect the weak and are necessary.

== Second forum ==
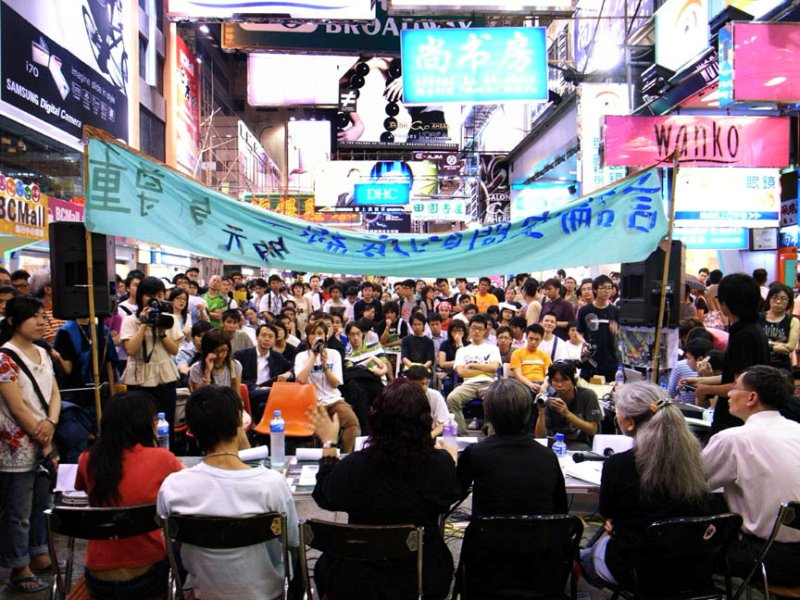
Mongkok Sai Yeung Choi Street forum site

The second forum was held on the evening of May 12 in Sai Yeung Choi Street, Mong Kok, titled "The Bottom Line of Speech Space - Diversity and Respect." About 300 people from both sides, including scholars and citizens, attended the forum. The invited Teachers' Association and Mingguang Society again refused to attend.

Li Yazhuang, the treasurer of the CUHK Student Newspaper, admitted at the forum that there were shortcomings in the handling of this incident, and that the pornographic section should be able to discuss sex in a deeper and more in-depth way. She apologized to the public for the above two points. However, together with Zeng Zhaowei, they still insist that the concept and purpose of the investigation are correct. In addition, Zeng Zhaowei expressed his gratitude to his family for their consideration on the forum. The editorial board of the student newspaper also pointed out that the media reports were biased and inaccurate, and that they were suppressed by conservative forces. The relevant handling made all members feel tremendous pressure. Many people in the venue supported the students, but there were also opponents present.

== Attended other forums ==
Chen Yufeng, editor of CUHK Student Newspaper, also attended the "City Forum" organized by Radio Television Hong Kong on May 13. The topic was "How do college students deal with freedom and responsibility when discussing sex?." Guests present that day included Mr Cheung Man-ping, Chairman of the Hong Kong Education Policy Concern Society, Mr Ho Hon-kuen, Vice Chairman of the Education Council, and Li Wai-yee, Chairman of the Hong Kong Sex Society. The audience also spoke enthusiastically. The scope of discussion that day included matters that college students should pay attention to when discussing sensitive issues, the school's handling methods, freedom of speech, etc. Zhang Minping said that the members of the Obscenity Trial Division come from different walks of life and have different opinions. They will not be affected by their earlier comments, but they still said that they do not want students to be punished by the school for relevant content. He Hanquan said that students have good intentions in setting up an erotic version, but he believes that They should reflect on why people in the public are so dissatisfied with its content; Li Weiyi questioned that both the school and the Obscenity Tribunal decided before trial.

Three weeks after the incident began, Eric Tsang attended the forum program "Speak It Straight" broadcast live on the Interactive TV Happy Health Channel. The guests present that day were Wu Minlun and Chen Shiqi, and there was also a call-in session from the audience. Wu Minlun pointed out on the program that foreign countries would not cause such a big reaction if they briefly mentioned bestiality and incest. However, he still commented that the CUHK Student Newspaper could do better in terms of pornographic content. Chen Shiqi said that Hong Kong people pursue a pure society too much, but the more repressive the society is, the more they will rebound. He also stated that sex education in society is poor and people can only obtain relevant information from pornographic materials. Therefore, if someone seriously discusses sex, they will be criticized for being obscene.

=== Being rated as indecent ===
Related report in Wikinews: Ming Pao's citation of the pornographic section was ruled indecent

On May 15, the Sexual Examination Department temporarily designated the February and March issues of the Chinese University Student Daily and the online version of the January and February issues as "indecent." On May 21, Ming Pao Daily reported that it had invited 8 current reviewers to rate it as "China University Student Daily."

As a result, all 7 reviewers rated it as the first level "not obscene or indecent." Only Ming Guang Society Director General Choi Chi-sum rated it as "indecent," and there were previous doubts that the complainant's background was related to Ming Guang Society. Therefore, many netizens accused Ming Guang Society of controlling the review process of the obscene review department, Ridicule him as the "moral Taliban." The President of the Hong Kong Society of Sexual Culture, Kai-man Kwan who is closely related to the Ming Guang Society, responded in an article that he opposes both secularist hegemony and a theocratic society. The statement from the Hong Kong Sexual Culture Society expresses the expectation that society will accommodate the opinions of Christians. Mingguang Society claimed that it was unaware of the relevant content before the newspaper reported it. Ming Pao also temporarily rated it as "indecent" on May 22 due to citing the erotic section of "University Student Daily" for discussion in "Sunday Life" on May 13.

==== Related protests ====
The above ruling has led netizens to launch various protest actions, including complaints against the Bible, "Beauty and the Beast," Gao Xingjian's "Lingshan," the Islam classic "Quran," and one of the four great wonders of Chinese literature, The Plum in the Golden Vase, which is considered "indecent" or "bloody," with the Bible being the most complained about. Li Weiyi, who hosts a sex mailbox column in the newspaper, analyzed that the purpose of these actions is to expose the "double standards" of sexual interrogation. And all complaints about classic works are not accepted by the Film and Television Department. In addition, the Fengyue edition of three newspapers received multiple complaints, all of which were rated as the first level "neither obscene nor indecent"

Since May 15, the Film and Television Department has received multiple complaints about the obscene and indecent content of the Bible. As of the evening of May 17, there have been over 2000 complaints. This is related to the dissatisfaction of netizens with the practice of censorship. The complaint against the Bible occurred immediately after the publication of the Chinese University Daily as a second level indecent item, and the convener also repeatedly cited the Chinese University Daily as a comparative object. British media Scotsman.com and American media Fox News Channel reprinted the relevant report on May 16.

The editorial board of China University Student Daily stated on May 17 that they were not involved in the operation and were not aware of it.

==== Meeting with Vice President ====
On May 17, the editorial board of China University Daily met with Vice President Zheng Zhenyao of CUHK to discuss follow-up work. Zheng Zhenyao pointed out that the purpose of the school issuing warning letters is to warn students not to publish "indecent content" in newspapers anymore, rather than to restrict publishing freedom, and pointed out that the school will not provide funding for appeals. In response to this response, the Student Union stated that if the incident enters legal proceedings, it will initiate fundraising to assist students in meeting litigation expenses; The CUHK Alumni Attention University Development Group also stated in its earlier response to the "indecent" rating that it will organize fundraising to meet litigation costs. On the same day, the Disciplinary Committee of the University of China decided to suspend the disciplinary proceedings after learning that the rating of the China University Student Daily was "involving judicial proceedings."

==== Request for review ====
The following day, China University Student Daily filed a request for review with the Eastern District Court [19], and Ming Pao also made a preliminary review of the indecency. The relevant hearing began on July 6. Later, due to lawyer Shen Shiwen representing China University Student Daily pointing out that the prescription did not specify the "indecent" part according to the procedure, it was submitted to the High Court for trial.

== Close a case ==
=== The school has closed the case ===
At a meeting on March 12, 2008, the school concluded that Tang Shihao, the editor in chief of the February and March 2007 issue of the China University Student Daily, had dropped out of school for other reasons in the first semester of 2007-08, and therefore had no right to impose any disciplinary action on him. The editor in chief of the April issue, Zeng Zhaowei, also decided not to take any disciplinary action after discussion with the school.

=== Judicial review ===
High Court Judge Lin Wenhan ultimately made a judgment on October 21, 2008, stating that the court did not specify the problematic parts of the Chinese University Student Daily in accordance with legal requirements, and only briefly stated that the images and text were "indecent"; In addition, it was also pointed out that the University Student Daily and Ming Pao are a combination of different elements, and the effects and purposes of different elements are different, which cannot be considered as a whole for rating. Therefore, he questioned whether the censorship department did not consider "overall significant effects" and whether the item "has a true purpose." Based on the above reasons, he ultimately ruled in favor of China University Student Daily and Ming Pao, withdrew the provisional rating, and did not need to be re rated. Representatives from China University Daily and Ming Pao both welcomed the ruling. After the victory of the High Court, the school still refused to withdraw the warning letter issued to the editorial board of the China University Student Daily

== Subsequent impact ==
=== Culture ===
The Fengyue edition of some newspapers decreased in frequency after the incident, and even closed completely on Sundays and public holidays. In addition, there is also a situation of self censorship in the selection of letters from readers of sex mailboxes due to fear of exceeding the standards of social figures. Some editorial board members of the 37th edition of the China University Student Daily stopped editing due to pressure during this incident. Dealing with the incident itself also consumed the remaining editorial board members' time and energy, which further affected the publishing work. Both of these factors led to an incomplete handover between the editorial board members of this edition and the subsequent editorial board members

This incident also prompted netizens to satirize and mock the Bible. One example of this is the website created or operated by a person named "Omega" and the Facebook page "Trembling Bible," which also participated in the complaint against the Bible; The Facebook page was renamed "Trembling Faith" due to the gradual coverage of other faiths in its criticism scope, and was independently operated by a group of netizens

=== Government ===
The Office of the Ombudsman (Hong Kong) has begun to intervene in response to the widespread social attention caused by the incident. After six months of investigation, although it pointed out that the standards of the Film and Television and Entertainment Licensing Authority are not "double standards," it still criticized the entry requirements and evaluation mechanism of the Film and Television Department staff for not meeting the standards. In addition, the Hong Kong government has also been prompted by this incident and the institutional challenges brought by Edison Chen photo scandal, and has held two public consultations. On October 3, 2008, a review document on the Control of Obscene and Indecent Articles Ordinance was launched. Although a proposed amendment was proposed in 2015, as of May 2019, the Hong Kong government has not yet submitted a draft amendment to the Legislative Council.

== See ==
- Morality
- Sexual ethics
- Religion and sexuality
- Social norms
- Wisdom of repugnance
- Argumentum ad populum
- I'm entitled to my opinion
- Sexual and reproductive health and rights
- Zhang Jingsheng, when soliciting manuscripts for The History of Sex (1926), once asked in vernacular: ..". Are there any other abnormal methods of ejaculation? For example, having sex with a hen, a male dog..."

== Related links ==
- Official website of China University Student Daily (page archive backup, stored in the Internet Archive)

=== Publication ===
- Statement of Joint Signature of Alumni and Public Members of Chinese Master Students
- 36th Village "Weeds" (Page Archive Backup, Stored in Internet Archive) 37th Village "Notes" (07-08) (Page Archive Backup, Stored in Internet Archive)
- Letter from the Academic Affairs and Quality Group of the Chinese University of Hong Kong to the Publishing Committee of the Chinese University Daily: To one of the editorial members (page archive backup, stored in the Internet Archive) (May 10, 2007) to all editorial members (page archive backup, stored in the Internet Archive) (May 10, 2007)

== Website ==
- Chinese University Student Daily - Emotional Version Dispute Discussion (blogspot. com) (page archive backup, stored in the Internet Archive)
- CUHK Alumni Concern Group
- Special Topic on the Sexual Affairs Section of the Chinese University of Hong Kong Student Daily

== Legislation ==
- Full text of the Hong Kong Obscene and Indecent Articles Control Ordinance (page archive backup, stored in the Internet Archive) Official website of the Hong Kong Department of Justice: Bilingual Legal Information System
