= Headliner (TV programme) =

Hong Kong news satire television program

- Title card of Headliner in 2020.
- 頭條新聞
- Genre: News satire; Public affairs
- Presented by: Ng Chi-sum; Tsang Chi-ho; Law Kai-sun; Wong He
- Opening theme: "To the Limit" by Richard Myhill
- Country of origin: People's Republic of China (Hong Kong)
- Original language: Cantonese

Production
- Running time: 21–22 minutes
- Production company: RTHK

Original release
- Network: RTHK TV 31
- Release: April 4, 1989 – June 19, 2020

Headliner
- Traditional Chinese: 頭條新聞
- Simplified Chinese: 头条新闻
- Literal meaning: Top news story
Transcriptions
Standard Mandarin
- Hanyu Pinyin: Tóutiáoxīnwén
Yue: Cantonese
- Jyutping: tau4 tiu4 san1 man4

Headliner (Chinese: 頭條新聞) was a Hong Kong television program produced by RTHK that airs on RTHK TV 31 which satires current affairs in Hong Kong, mainland China and the rest of the world. It first aired on 4 April 1989.

The show contains satirical sketches with self-referential humour, along with segments of news clips paired with music (Cantopop in particular), and content from guest contributors. A radio version of the show was briefly aired during the 1990s.

Headliner, being critical of the government of Hong Kong, was suspended indefinitely in May 2020 after the Communications Authority warned the broadcaster for "insulting" the police force in an episode aired on 14 February. RTHK says they will suspend the production of Headliner after this season was completed, the last episode was broadcast on 19 June.

== Incidents ==
=== Tung Chee-hwa comment ===
In October 2001, Tung Chee-hwa, the first Chief Executive of Hong Kong, commented that Headliner is "bad-taste production" after an episode aired on 13 October 2001 linked his administration to the Taliban. Chinese state newspapers People's Daily and Ta Kung Pao also criticised the programme and RTHK for being "anti-Tung".

=== TVB cancellation ===
On 5 July 2017, a first-run episode of the Headliner which aired a speech by Xi Jinping, General Secretary of the Chinese Communist Party – who was visiting Hong Kong that week – was cancelled by TVB. The episode was later aired on its J5 channel instead, while the RTHK TV 31 premiere remain untouched. TVB was accused for self-censorship. Amen Ng Man-yee, head of corporate communications of RTHK, stated that complaints has been made. Ng added that they are "awfully displeased" and believe that the suspension is "unusual and unprofessional".

=== Suspension ===
In February 2020, the Hong Kong Police Force issued an official complaint to the Director of Broadcasting of RTHK about an episode aired on 14 February, objecting in particular to a sketch where a cast member dressed as a police officer suggested that the force stockpiled large amount of personal protective equipment while leaving other government departments and medical workers short amid the COVID-19 outbreak. The police expressed "extreme regret", and argued that the supply is needed for its large workforce.

RTHK later responded that they "[understood] the hard work of the police" but explained the show offered a satirical perspective based on "different voices in the society". RTHK Programme Staff Union also added that the police force should accept public criticism.

The Office of the Communications Authority announced on 18 February that they had received more than 200 complaints about the programme. Edward Yau, the Secretary for Commerce and Economic Development, urged RTHK to abide by its own charter. On 19 February, a group protesting the RTHK defamation of the police gathered outside the Hong Kong Police Headquarters, urging the force to issue a warning letter or sue the broadcaster for libel. Staff of the show thanked the viewers on Facebook, citing the show will do its best with the support from viewers. Within one day, the Headliner team's post had received some 197,000 thumbs up emojis by lunchtime, and over 250,000 signatures were collected in an online petition in support of the programme by April.

In May 2020, the Communications Authority issued a warning to the broadcaster for "insulting" the police force and has promoted "insult and prejudice" by portraying police as trash. RTHK issued an apology to police officers and all others who were offended, and suspended the program, adding that a review would also be done afterwards. Yau said the ruling was fair and should be respected, and urged RTHK review its management.

On 29 January 2021, it was ruled that Headliner has broadcast content that was deemed to be insulting towards the HKPF.
