= Commerce and Economic Development Bureau =

Policy bureau of the Hong Kong Government

- 商務及經濟發展局
- Emblem of the Hong Kong SAR

Agency overview
- Formed: 2007
- Headquarters: Central Government Complex, Admiralty
- Employees: 450
- Minister responsible: Algernon Yau, Secretary for Commerce and Economic Development
- Deputy Minister responsible: Bernard Chan, Under Secretary for Commerce and Economic Development
- Agency executive: Maggie WOng, Permanent Secretary for Commerce and Economic Development
- Child agencies: Intellectual Property Department; Invest Hong Kong; Office of the Communications Authority; Hongkong Post; Radio Television Hong Kong; Trade and Industry Department; Hong Kong Economic and Trade Office (Overseas)
- Website: cedb.gov.hk

Commerce and Economic Development Bureau
- Traditional Chinese: 商務及經濟發展局
- Simplified Chinese: 商务及经济发展局
Transcriptions
Standard Mandarin
- Hanyu Pinyin: Shāngwù jí Jīngjìfāzhǎn Jú
Yue: Cantonese
- Yale Romanization: Sēung mouh kahp gīng jai faat jín guhk
- Jyutping: Soeng1 mou6 kap6 ging1 zai3 faat3 zin2 guk6

The Commerce and Economic Development Bureau is a policy bureau of the Government of Hong Kong responsible for policy matters on Hong Kong's external commercial relations, inward investment promotion, intellectual property protection, industry and business support, tourism, consumer protection and competition, as well as broadcasting, film-related issues, overall view of creative industries, development of telecommunications, and control of obscene and indecent articles in Hong Kong.

The bureau is headed by the Secretary for Commerce and Economic Development.

== History ==
In January 2021, the department, under Edward Yau, said that a policy to require SIM card registration, where users of SIM cards would need to link their IDs, was necessary. In May 2023, after the policy was implemented, the government revealed that phone scams increased by 76% from the first quarter of 2022 to the first quarter of 2023. In May 2023, Cheung Wun-yiu filed a judicial appeal against the SIM card registration policy.

== Subordinate departments ==
The following public entities are managed by the bureau:

- Hong Kong Economic and Trade Offices (Overseas)
- Intellectual Property Department
- Invest Hong Kong
- Office of the Communications Authority
- Post Office
- Radio Television Hong Kong
- Trade and Industry Department

== See also ==
- Hong Kong Disciplined Services
- Hong Kong Trade Development Council
- Consumer Council (Hong Kong)
- Competition Commission
- Communications Authority
- Hong Kong Export Credit Insurance Corporation
