= Rita Lau =

Hong Kong civil servant

Rita Lau GBS JP
- 劉吳惠蘭
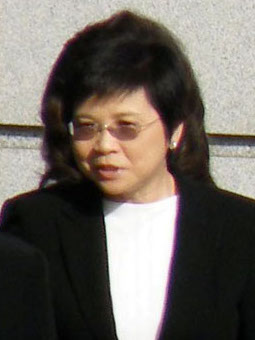

Secretary for Commerce and Economic Development
- In office 12 July 2008 – 12 April 2011
- Chief Executive: Donald Tsang
- Preceded by: Frederick Ma
- Succeeded by: Gregory So

Personal details
- Born: 8 May 1953 (age 73) British Hong Kong
- Party: None
- Education: University of Hong Kong

Rita Lau
- Traditional Chinese: 劉吳惠蘭
- Simplified Chinese: 刘吴惠兰
Transcriptions
Standard Mandarin
- Hanyu Pinyin: Liú Wú Huèilán
Yue: Cantonese
- Jyutping: lau4 ng4 wai6 laan4

Rita Lau Ng Wai-lan GBS JP (born 8 May 1953) is a Hong Kong former civil servant. She was appointed Secretary for Commerce and Economic Development in July 2008 after her predecessor Frederick Ma resigned for health reasons. Coincidentally, ill-health also forced her resignation from this position on 8 April 2011, following an operation to remove a colon tumour.

== Civil Service ==
Mrs Lau joined as Hong Kong Civil Service in 1976. She has served in various bureaux and departments in the government. She was Deputy Secretary for Information Technology and Broadcasting (1998), Director of Urban Services (1999), Director of Food and Environmental Hygiene (2000), Permanent Secretary for the Environment, Transport and Works (Environment and Transport) (July 2002–January 2004) and Permanent Secretary for Housing, Planning and Lands (Planning and Lands) (May 2004–July 2007), and Permanent Secretary for Commerce and Economic Development (Communications and Technology) (July 2007–July 2008). She trained at Tsinghua University in Beijing between January and April, 2004.

She has been Chairman of the Public Service Commission since May 2014.

Political offices
| Preceded by Frederick Ma | Secretary for Commerce and Economic Development; 2008–2011 | Succeeded by Gregory So |
Government offices
| Preceded by Francis Ho Suen-wai | Permanent Secretary for Commerce and Economic Development Communications & Technology; 2007–2008 | Succeeded by zh:Duncan Pescod |
| Preceded by Carrie Lam | Permanent Secretary for Housing, Planning & Lands Planning & Lands; 2004–2007 | Succeeded by Raymond Young Lap-moon |
| New title | Permanent Secretary for the Environment, Transport & Works Environment & Transport; 2002–2004 | Succeeded by zh:Keith Kwok Ka-keung; Environment |
| New title | Permanent Secretary for the Environment, Transport & Works Environment & Transport; 2002–2004 | Succeeded by Joshua Law Chi-kong; Transport |
Order of precedence
| Preceded by The Hon. Madam Justice Wong; Judges of the Court of First Instance of the High Court | Hong Kong order of precedence Chairman of the Public Service Commission | Succeeded by Ms Connie Lau Yin-hing; Ombudsman |
