= Director general =

Title given to the highest executive officer in some organizations

A director general, general director or director-general (plural: directors general, general directors, directors-general, director generals or director-generals) is a senior executive officer, often the chief executive officer, within a governmental, statutory, NGO, third sector or not-for-profit institution. The term is commonly used in many countries worldwide, but with various meanings.

== Australia ==
In most Australian states, the director-general is the most senior civil servant in any government department, reporting only to the democratically elected minister representing that department. In Victoria and the Australian government, the equivalent position is the secretary of the department.

The Australian Defence Force Cadets has three directors-general which are all one-star ranks:

- Director-General of the Australian Navy Cadets
- Director-General of the Australian Army Cadets
- Director-General of the Australian Air Force Cadets

== Canada ==
In Canada, the title director general is used in the federal civil service, known as the Public Service of Canada. A director general in the federal government is typically not the most senior civil servant in a department. Directors general typically report to a more senior civil servant, such as an assistant deputy minister or associate deputy minister. The title "director general" is not usually used within the civil services of the ten provincial governments, nor the three territorial governments; instead, these civil services usually use the title "executive director", or "director". Deputy ministers are the highest level bureaucrat within the Canadian civil service at the federal, provincial and territorial levels. Deputy ministers are not politicians but non-partisan civil servants. Outside the federal, provincial and territorial civil services, some public sector agencies such as school boards in Quebec use the title "director general".

== European Union ==
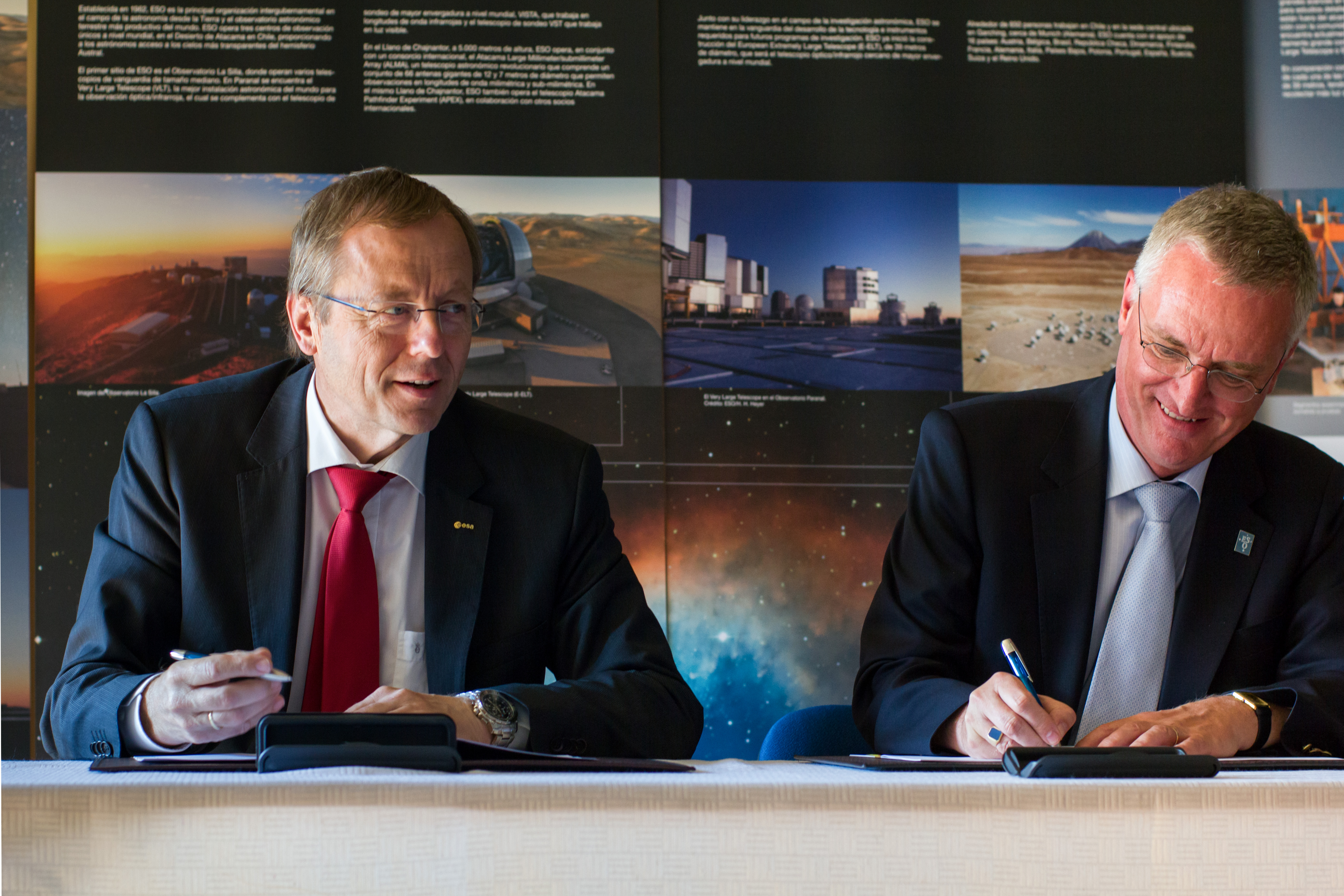
ESO and ESA directors-general sign cooperation agreement

In the European Commission and the Council of the European Union, each department (called a directorate-general) is headed by a non-political director-general. This is roughly equivalent to a British permanent secretary.

== France ==
In France, the similar word président-directeur général (PDG) means the highest person in a company, who is at the same time chairman (président) of the board of directors and CEO (directeur général). From 2001 the two charges may be disjointed. The directeur général délégué has a role similar to that of a chief operating officer.

French ministries are divided into general directorates (directions générales), sometimes named central directorates (directions centrales) or simply directorates (directions), headed respectively by a directeur général, a directeur central, or a directeur.

== Ethiopia ==
Prior to the coup d'état of 1974 which overthrew the government of Emperor Haile Selassie, the chief civil servant of a government ministry or independent state agency was known by the title of director-general. In contemporary Ethiopia, the head official of independent agencies such as the Information Network Security Agency or the Ethiopian Investment Corporation is titled director-general, as are second-tier divisions within ministries, below [permanent] secretariats.

== Germany ==
In Germany, Generaldirektor may be used for the CEO of a large and established concern, corporation, company or enterprise, particularly if subordinates have the title director. The title is, however, unofficial (theoretically any person, and even practically every entrepreneur with one employee, may call himself director-general) and by now largely out of use. Officially a GmbH has a Geschäftsführer ('managing director'), an Aktiengesellschaft, and a board of executive directors (Vorstand) with a chairman (Vorstandsvorsitzender).

The term is also used by German Institute Taipei, Germany's informal representative mission to the Republic of China (Taiwan), to refer to its head of mission, as well as the suggested translation for senior executive positions (Abteilungsleiterin or Abteilungsleiter) in German ministries.

== Hong Kong ==
Several positions in the Hong Kong government bear titled director-general, including the directors-general of investment promotion, of trade and industry, of civil aviation, and of the Hong Kong Economic and Trade Office, London.

== India ==
In India, director general may refer to the director general of the Border Security Force or to the director general of police, who is the highest ranking official in the Central Armed Police Forces, the National Disaster Response Force, and the Indian Coast Guard. In addition, the head of many government agencies are also referred to as directors general, like the director general of the Archaeological Survey of India, the director general of the Central Statistics Office, the director general of the National Informatics Centre (NIC), the director general of the Indian Council of Medical Research, etc.

== Italy ==
In Italy, the direttore generale of a company is a corporate officer who reports to the CEO (amministratore delegato) and has duties similar to a chief operating officer.

Some Italian ministries are divided into departments (dipartimenti), which are in turn divided into general directorates (direzioni generali) headed by a direttore generale. Other ministries, which do not have departments, are directly divided into general directorates. In Italian provinces and greatest communes, direttore generale is a chief administrative officer nominated by the president of province or by the mayor. The title of direttore generale is also given to the chief executive of an azienda sanitaria, a local public agency for health services.

== Philippines ==
The word director-general was used in the Philippines as a highest ranking law enforcer, which means the head of a law enforcement agency. Such agencies are:

- Philippine National Police (until 2019)
- Philippine Drug Enforcement Agency
- Bureau of Corrections

It is also used in various government agencies as the agency's chief of office:

- Food and Drug Administration
- National Economic and Development Authority
- National Intelligence Coordinating Agency
- National Security Council
- Technical Education and Skills Development Authority

.. and also on the following international Non-government organizations:

- International Rice Research Institute

== Russia ==
A general director is the highest executive position in a Russian company, analogous to a US chief executive officer (CEO), or a UK managing director (MD). The position exists for all Commonwealth of Independent States (CIS) legal forms (e.g. joint stock companies (AO) and limited-liability companies (OOO)), except for sole proprietorships (IP).

The general director is the "single-person executive body" of a company, acts without power of attorney to represent the company, and issues powers of attorney to others. The general director's powers are defined by the company charter, by decision of the general meeting of shareholders (AO) or participants (OOO), and by the board of directors.

== Spain ==
In Spain, México, and other Spanish-speaking countries, the term director general of a company (similar to a US corporation) is either the general manager or CEO of the company.

== South Africa ==
In South Africa, the term refers to the non-political head of the national government and its departments. Provincial governments also have directors-general and they hold similar roles to their national counterparts.

== Sweden ==
In Sweden, the cognate word Generaldirektör (GD) is the generic title for the head of a state agency, unless otherwise prescribed by higher authority. For purposes of English translations, the word director-general is officially used.

== United Kingdom ==
In the UK's civil service, a director-general is now usually a senior civil servant (SCS) at pay band 3 level who heads up a group of other directors and reports directly to the permanent secretary of a department.

For historical reasons, it has also been retained as the professional title of the chief executive officers in some organisations which predate the current SCS structure and therefore may be used by those people despite them working at different pay bands. For example, the head of the UK's internal security service MI5 is also called director-general, despite the fact that the post is at permanent secretary (pay band 4) level.

The chief executive of the British Broadcasting Corporation also uses the title despite there being no link to the civil service grading structure. The head of the National Trust also holds the title. The head of Camping and Caravanning Club also holds the title of Director General.

== United States ==
This term is used in international organisations and government departments, although this sort of position is more commonly called an "executive director" or "managing director" in the United States.

Typically, the chief administrative officer of an opera company in the US holds the title of "general director". Such was the case with singer and conductor Plácido Domingo, who formerly functioned in that capacity for the Los Angeles Opera, as he had previously for the Washington National Opera. In another prominent example, Speight Jenkins served as the general director of the Seattle Opera for over three decades. General directors are often responsible for artistic decisions, such as which operas to perform and which singers to hire, in addition to financial matters. The Metropolitan Opera is one of the few exceptions among US opera houses; the head of its administration is known as a "general manager" rather than a general director.
