= HKBA =

HKBA may refer to:

- Hong Kong Bar Association, a professional regulatory body for barristers in Hong Kong
- Hong Kong Broadcasting Authority, a defunct organisation responsible for licensing and regulating the broadcasting industry in Hong Kong
- Hong Kong Buddhist Association, a Buddhist umbrella organisation in Hong Kong
