= Gregory So =

Hong Kong politician (1958–2025)

Gregory So Kam-leung
- 蘇錦樑
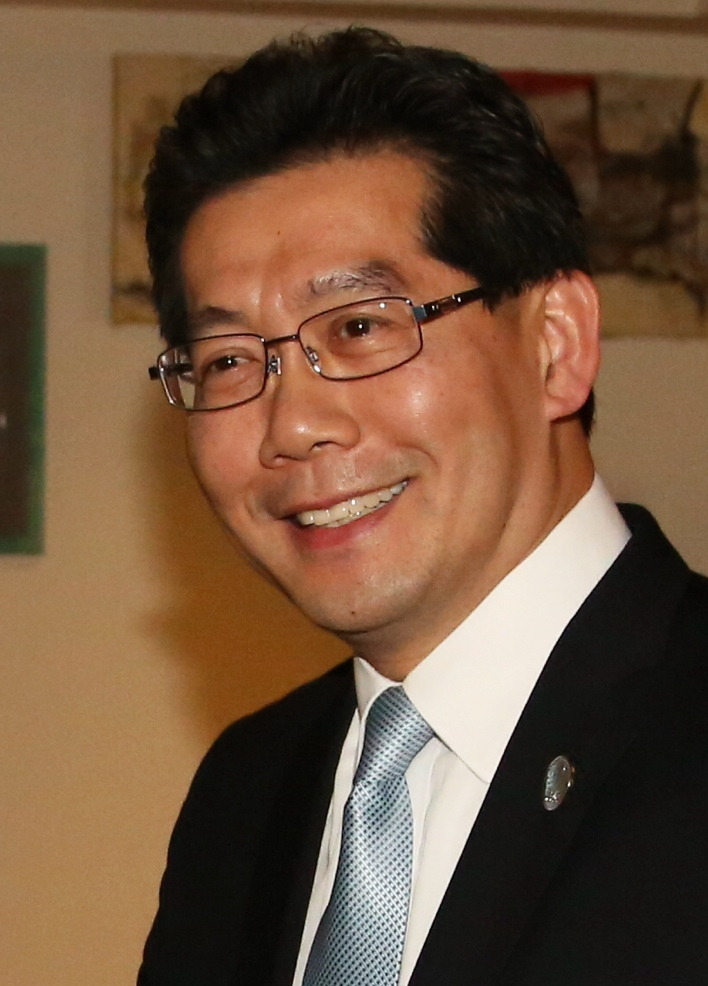
- So in October 2013

Secretary for Commerce and Economic Development
- In office 28 June 2011 – 30 June 2017; Acting from 13 April 2011 – 27 June 2011
- Chief Executive: Donald Tsang; Leung Chun-ying
- Preceded by: Rita Lau
- Succeeded by: Edward Yau

Undersecretary for Commerce and Economic Development
- In office 2 June 2008 – 27 June 2011
- Secretary: Rita Lau
- Preceded by: Position Created
- Succeeded by: Vacant
- Chief Executive: Sir Donald Tsang

Personal details
- Born: 12 October 1958 British Hong Kong
- Died: 13 December 2025 (aged 67) Singapore
- Party: Democratic Alliance for the Betterment and Progress of Hong Kong
- Education: Carleton University; University of Ottawa

Gregory So Kam-leung (traditional Chinese: 蘇錦樑; simplified Chinese: 苏锦梁; 12 October 1958 – 13 December 2025) was a Hong Kong politician and solicitor who served as Secretary for Commerce and Economic Development from 2011 to 2017.

== Early life and education ==
So was born on 12 October 1958. He held a Bachelor of Arts degree in Economics from Carleton University and a double degree of Master of business administration and Bachelor of Laws from the University of Ottawa.

He moved to Canada at age 16, returning to Hong Kong in the 1980s. He got married and raised his family in Canada. So left Canada in the late 1990s, after working as a lawyer in Ontario, and returned to work in Hong Kong. As a senior government official, so no longer had Canadian citizenship.

== Career ==
=== Professional career ===
So was the senior partner of a solicitor's firm, member of the Hospital Authority, the Council of the Lingnan University, and the Commission on Strategic Development.

=== Political career ===
So was the vice chairman of the Democratic Alliance for the Betterment and Progress of Hong Kong when he was appointed Under Secretary. He resigned as the party's vice chairman then, but still maintained his membership.

Between 2000 and 2003, So served on the Wong Tai Sin District Council and the Tsz Wan Shan Area Committee.

In 2008, he was nominated Undersecretary for the Commerce and Economic Development under the 2008 Political Appointments System, at the 'cost' of having to renounce his Canadian citizenship. "It was a tough decision. In doing so, I have also had to give up my legal practice qualification in Canada where I still have friends and relatives," he said.

On 28 June 2011, So was appointed to succeed Rita Lau as Secretary for Commerce and Economic Development after she resigned for health reasons in April 2011.

On 6 May 2014, So's office and home received delivery of faeces after he told Hong Kongers to tolerate incidents where Mainland visitors freely defecate and urinate on the streets of Hong Kong. So's comment came after a Mainlander had become violent to bystanders after they allowed their child to urinate in public in Hong Kong. After the receipt of the faeces delivery, So also announced threats to the people responsible for stating their actions to be "very unwise."

== Personal life and death ==
His brother, Kevin So Kam-wai, was sentenced to more than six years in jail for money laundering.

So died on 13 December 2025 in Singapore, at the age of 67.

Political offices
New title	Undersecretary for Commerce and Economic Development; 2008–2011	Vacant
Preceded by Rita Lau	Secretary for Commerce and Economic Development; 2011–2017	Succeeded by Edward Yau
