= Harbour Fest =

Music festival in Hong Kong

Hong Kong Harbour Fest
- Traditional Chinese: 維港巨星匯
- Simplified Chinese: 維港巨星汇
Transcriptions
Yue: Cantonese
- Jyutping: Wai4gong2 Geoi6sing1wui6
- IPA: [wɐj˩kɔŋ˧˥ kɵɥ˨sɪŋ˥wuj˨]

The Hong Kong Harbour Fest (Chinese: 維港巨星匯), held from 17 October to 11 November 2003, was part of a HK$1 billion program to revive the economy of Hong Kong SAR after the SARS. It was a government underwritten event organised by InvestHK, under the auspices of the Economic Relaunch Working Group, in collaboration with the American Chamber of Commerce. The event was billed as "a dazzling series of live shows catering to all tastes and ages, encompassing rock n' roll, family entertainment, blues and jazz, classical, theatrical performances and a Vegas Night." Its organisation, which resulted in massive cost overruns, was heavily criticised.

== History ==
=== Background ===
In its efforts to rebuild Hong Kong's image after the SARS outbreak, the government asked Legco for and obtained approval for a HK$1 billion package to finance certain initiatives. However, the government was criticised for not revealing how the money would be spent.

The event was agreed upon by the Economic Relaunch Working Group ("ERWG"), which was led by the then financial secretary Antony Leung. Jim Thompson of the American Chamber of Commerce (AmCham) proposed a three-week waterfront music extravaganza, and concerts by popular local and international acts.

=== Project and rationale ===
Harbour Fest would be organised by AmCham, who would retain future rights to the event name; the government underwrote the project. The organisers initially estimated the festival would cost HK$130 million to stage. They said it will raise HK$50 million assuming half of the 200,000 tickets were sold. Any shortfall would be met by taxpayers. The ERWG agreed to a HK$80 million "sponsorship fee and money to underwrite losses of the festival".

It was billed as "a dazzling series of live shows catering to all tastes and ages, encompassing rock n' roll, family entertainment, blues and jazz, classical, theatrical performances and a Vegas Night", to be staged outdoors at Admiralty's Tamar site over four weekends, from 17 October to 9 November 2003. A large concert stage would be erected, with reserved seating for up to 13,000 people per show. In excess of 200,000 tickets would be made available for the entire event.

The declared objective was to attract people from North America, Europe and other countries in the region back to Hong Kong, with the Walt Disney Company screening a one-hour highlights package of the concerts in the United States over Christmas 2003.

== Performance roster ==
Roster
Date (in 2003)	Performers
17 October	Prince, Karen Mok
18 October	
18 October	Craig David
19 October	
20 October	José Carreras, Charlotte Church, Hong Kong Philharmonic Orchestra
24 October	t.A.T.u., Twins
25 October	Westlife, Energy, Evonne Hsu
26 October	Air Supply, Eason Chan, Ronald Cheng
30 October	Gipsy Kings, Danny Diaz, Lee Hyori
31 October	Gigi Leung, Yumiko Cheng, Boy'z, Candy Lo, Shine, Seven
1 November	Santana, Andy Hui
2 November	Gary Valenciano
6 November	Neil Young, Michelle Branch
7 November	The Rolling Stones
9 November	The Rolling Stones

Although Prince attracted 11,000 people, attendance at other shows was poor. On 7 November and 9 November 2003, The Rolling Stones played their first ever concerts in Hong Kong, as part of Harbour Fest.

== Controversies ==
This cost was criticised by legislators and critics as too expensive. The underwriting cost soon went up to HK$100 million. The Democratic Party surveyed 900 members of the public, and established that more than 50% of the polled believe the government was wasting public money on the Harbour Fest, and Ma Lik said the government appeared to act as if it had received carte blanche.

On 21 October, AmCham announced that previously billed Cantopop artists Andy Hui, Joey Yung and Nicholas Tse would no longer appear due to artists prior commitments. The artists' agent, Emperor Entertainment Group, however, alleges that AmCham had dropped them from the billings.

The organisers then decided to give away tickets for the concert which was to have featured Atomic Kitten, which dropped out due to illness of singer Natasha Hamilton. The distribution of free tickets to see the remaining acts Twins and t.A.T.u. was marred by scuffles at outlets which saw tickets snapped up within 30 minutes. Many hundreds who had queued up for many hours were furious.

The appearance of The Rolling Stones was shrouded in confusion until 14 October, when their two nights at the festival were finally confirmed. They were reportedly paid US$5 million for the concerts.

== Aftermath ==
=== Independent inquiry ===
An Independent Panel of Inquiry headed by Moses Cheng was commissioned to review and investigate the handling of the Harbour Fest, and a report of the Harbour Fest was issued in May 2004.

=== Public Accounts Committee report ===
In June 2004, a legislative council Public Accounts Committee report criticised InvestHK for improper stewardship of taxpayers' money over the organisation of Harbour Fest music festival, a post-SARS event held in an attempt to restore business confidence in Hong Kong. Rowse was charged with five offences:

- failure to introduce provisions to give the Government power of approval over program and budget changes
- failure to provide refund in a sponsorship agreement with the American Chamber of Commerce for events not held, and for the Chamber to regularly report on progress, and to consult with Government on ticketing strategy
- failure to review ticket pricing strategy and free ticket distribution
- failure to establish a mechanism for InvestHK to scrutinise budget and expenditure of the event

Rowse was held responsible only for the fifth charge of failing to ensure that InvestHK critically examine the HarbourFest budget, and fully and adequately advise the working group on the finances. Consequently, he was fined one month's salary when the government made a ruling in October 2005.

He appealed, but on 26 January 2007, Chief Secretary Rafael Hui confirmed the October 2005 ruling, and the consequential fine. A member of Legco criticised the fact that there have been more reports of the disciplinary hearings in the media than to Legco. Legislator Cheung Man Kwong criticised the government for making Rowse a scapegoat for ministerial failure: "...ministers, including the Finance chief, only apologised without any punishment". Another one questioned the political motivation : "How come the timing of the decision against the appeal is so coincidental [with the election for the Chief Executive]?".

=== Appeal ===
During an Economic Relaunch Working Group meeting on 31 October 2003 and during an independent inquiry in May 2004, then financial secretary Henry Tang is alleged to have said Michael Rowse, Director General of InvestHK, had not acted improperly and that there had been no irregularity in the implementation of the event. Tang had also said that all parties had underestimated the complexity of the event and may have been too ambitious in organising it in such a short timespan. He later withdrew the remark: just before a government inquiry opened in November 2004, Tang requested the ERWG minutes be deleted. Rowse's counsel argued for the appeal saying his client's case was prejudiced as he had been denied legal representation.

=== Court ruling ===
In July 2008, Rowse has won his judicial review against the government's decision to fine him HK$156,000 for his role in organising Harbour Fest. The judge found there to have been a breach of the rule of fairness: as the threshold of the burden of proof was not sufficiently high, the committee's findings should not have been relied on by the Secretary for the civil service. He further ruled that Donald Tsang had acted outside his powers in deciding to delegate his decision under the administration order to the Chief Secretary.

== See also ==
- Molson Canadian Rocks for Toronto, a similar event held in Toronto, Canada to revive the economy after SARS.
