= Secretary for Innovation, Technology and Industry =

Hong Kong Special Administrative Region Secretary for Innovation, Technology and Industry 創新科技及工業局局長
- Emblem of Hong Kong

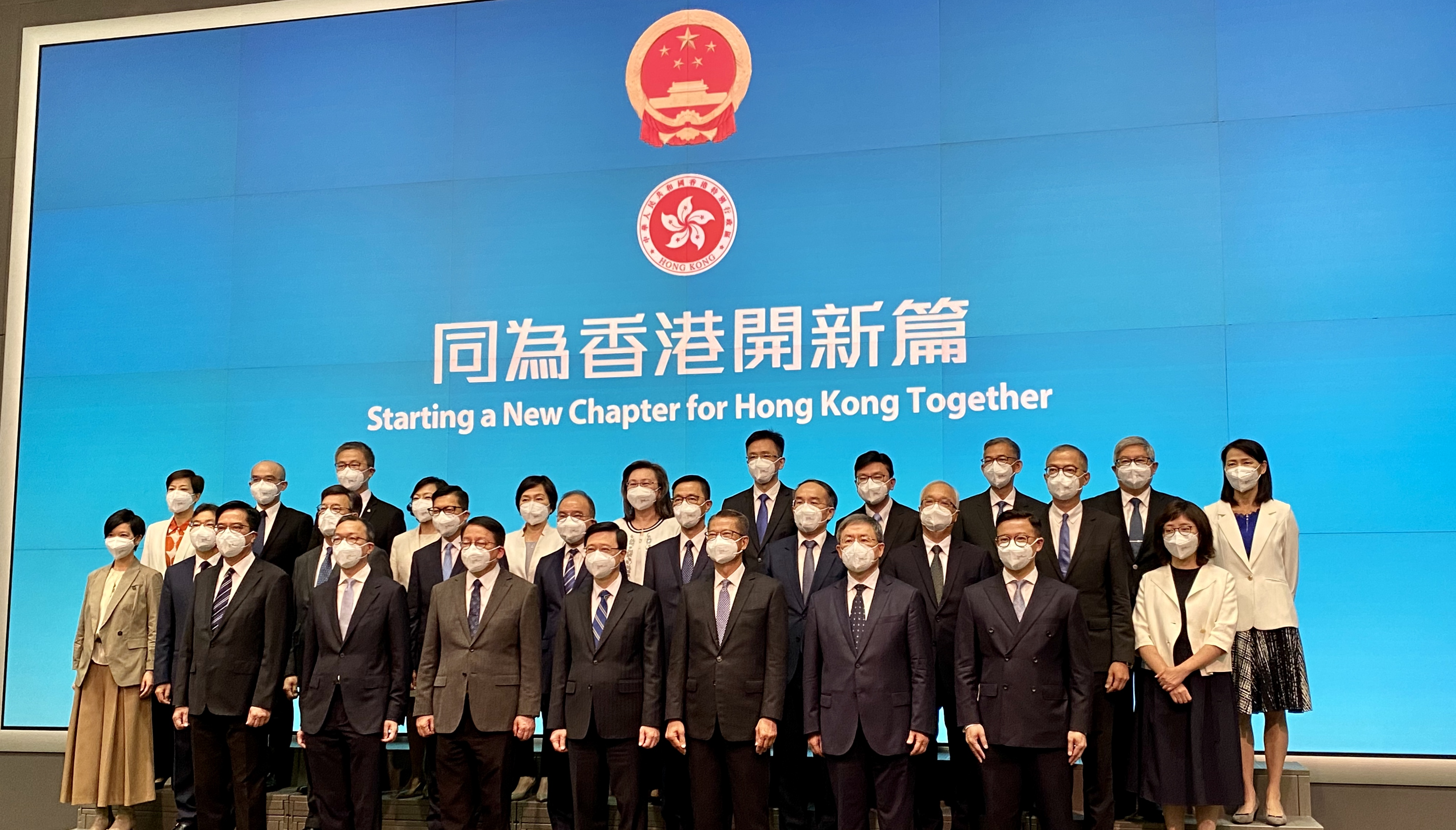
- Incumbent; Dong Sun since 1 July 2022
- Innovation, Technology and Industry Bureau
- Style: The Honourable
- Appointer: Central People's Government nomination by Chief Executive
- Inaugural holder: Nicholas Yang
- Formation: 20 November 2015
- Salary: HK$4,021,200 per annum
- Website: ITIB

The Secretary for Innovation, Technology and Industry (Chinese: 創新科技及工業局局長), formerly Secretary for Innovation and Technology (Chinese: 創新及科技局局長), is a Hong Kong Government position created in 2015 by the Leung Chun-ying government after years-long opposition of the pan-democracy camp.

The predecessor, Secretary for Information Technology and Broadcasting (Chinese: 資訊科技及廣播局局長), was created in 1998 by merging the previous portfolios of the Secretary for Broadcasting, Culture and Sport and the Secretary for Trade and Industry. Head of the Information Technology and Broadcasting Bureau, the secretary is responsible for managing Hong Kong's broadcasting services, developing the film industry, promoting Hong Kong's telecommunications, and providing support to the application of Information Technology within the Government. The position was abolished in July 2002.

In 2022, Carrie Lam proposed the restructuring of the Government Secretariat, expanding the Innovation and Technology Bureau into "Innovation, Technology and Industry Bureau" in response to the policy of reindustrialization of Hong Kong. After the resolution was passed in the Legislative Council, starting from 1 July 2022, the Secretary for Innovation and Technology renamed as "Secretary for Innovation, Technology and Industry". John Lee, as the next Chief Executive, appointed Dong Sun as the new secretary to the Bureau.

== List of office holders ==
Political party: Nonpartisan

=== Secretaries for Information Technology and Broadcast, 1998–2002 ===
No.	Portrait	Name	Term of office		Duration	Chief Executive	Term	Ref
1		Kwong Ki-chi 鄺其志	April 1998	30 June 2000	2 years, 90 days	Tung Chee-hwa (1997–2005)	1	
2		Carrie Yau Tsang Kar-lai 尤曾家麗	1 July 2000	30 June 2002	1 year, 364 days	Tung Chee-hwa (1997–2005)	1	

Technology issues were handled by the Secretary for Commerce, Industry and Technology between 2002 and 2007, and Secretary for Commerce and Economic Development between 2007 and 2015.

=== Secretaries for Innovation and Technology, 2015–2022 ===
No.	Portrait	Name	Term of office		Duration	Chief Executive	Term	Ref
1		Nicholas Yang Wei-hsiung 楊偉雄	20 November 2015	22 April 2020	4 years, 154 days	Leung Chun-ying (2012–2017)	4	
1		Nicholas Yang Wei-hsiung 楊偉雄	20 November 2015	22 April 2020	4 years, 154 days	Carrie Lam (2017–2022)	5	
2		Alfred Sit Wing-hang 薛永恒	22 April 2020	30 June 2022	2 years, 70 days	Carrie Lam (2017–2022)	5	

=== Secretaries for Innovation, Technology and Industry, 2022–present ===
No.	Portrait	Name	Term of office		Duration	Chief Executive	Term	Ref
1		Dong Sun 孫東	1 July 2022	Incumbent	4 years, 68 days	John Lee (2022–present)	6	
