= Edward Yau =

Hong Kong politician

Edward Yau Tang-wah GBS JP
- 邱騰華
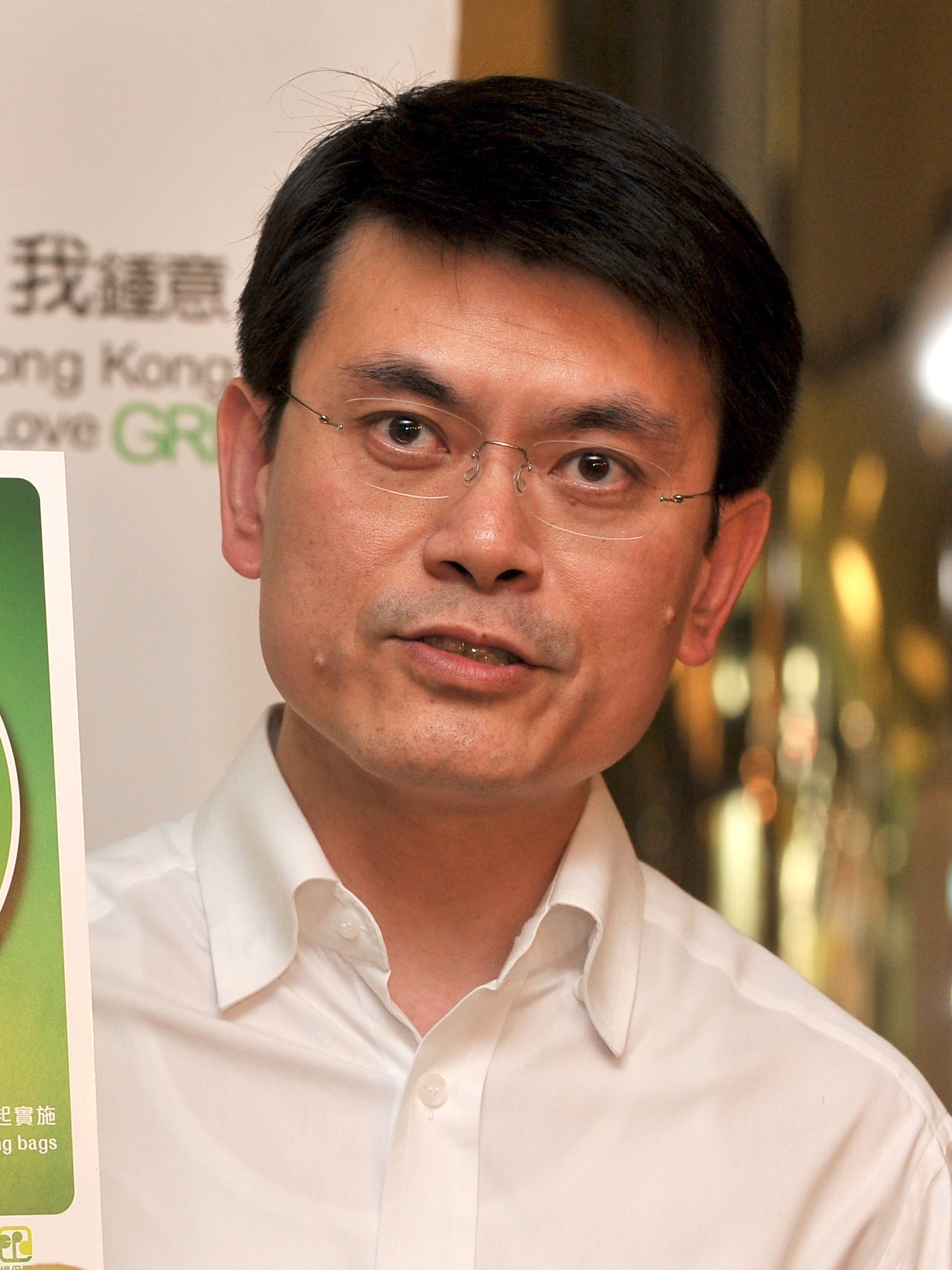
- Edward Yau introducing the plastic levy in 2009

Secretary for Commerce and Economic Development
- In office 1 July 2017 – 30 June 2022
- Chief Executive: Carrie Lam
- Preceded by: Gregory So
- Succeeded by: Algernon Yau

Director, Office of the Chief Executive
- In office 1 July 2012 – 30 June 2017
- Chief Executive: Leung Chun-ying
- Preceded by: Gabriel Leung
- Succeeded by: Eric Chan

Secretary for the Environment
- In office 1 July 2007 – 30 June 2012
- Chief Executive: Sir Donald Tsang
- Preceded by: Position established
- Succeeded by: Wong Kam-sing

Director of the Information Services
- In office 2006–2007
- Preceded by: Yvonne Choi
- Succeeded by: Fung Ching Suk-yee

Personal details
- Born: 28 April 1960 (age 66) British Hong Kong
- Education: University of Hong Kong; Oxford University; Harvard University

Edward Yau
- Traditional Chinese: 邱騰華
- Simplified Chinese: 邱腾华
Transcriptions
Standard Mandarin
- Hanyu Pinyin: Qiū Ténghuá
Yue: Cantonese
- Yale Romanization: Yāu Tàhng wàh
- Jyutping: Jau^{1} Tang^{4} waa^{4}

Edward Yau Tang-wah, GBS, JP (Chinese: 邱騰華; born 28 April 1960, Hong Kong) is a Hong Kong politician. He was the Secretary for the Environment from 2007 to 2012, and from 2012 to 2017, he was the Director of the Chief Executive's Office of Hong Kong. He served as Secretary for Commerce and Economic Development from 2017 to 2022.

== Career ==
Yau joined the Administrative Service in August 1981 and earned more than 30 years of public administration experience. During his years as a civil servant, he was Deputy Director-General of Trade (later renamed Deputy Director-General of Trade and Industry), Director-General of the Hong Kong Economic and Trade Office in Washington, and Deputy Secretary for Education and Manpower, and Director of Information Services.

Yau was the Secretary for the Environment from 2007 to 2012. His responsibilities covered environmental protection, energy, and sustainable development. Nature conservation was also one of his main tasks and with his efforts, he established the Hong Kong Geopark which showcases the unique geological features in northeast Hong Kong. The Park obtained the UNESCO Global Geopark status in 2011.

From 2012 to 2017, he was the Director of the Chief Executive's Office of Hong Kong, and his responsibilities were to assist the Chief Executive in formulating policies and setting policy goals and priorities; and to maintain close contacts with Executive and Legislative Councillors, political parties as well as the public sector to enlist their support for Government work.

=== Secretary for Commerce and Economic Development ===
Yau returned to the cabinet in 2017 as Secretary for Commerce and Economic Development in Carrie Lam's government.

In 2020, after RTHK journalist Yvonne Tong asked WHO assistant director-general Bruce Aylward about the status of Taiwan, Yau claimed that the show had violated the "One China" principle.

In September 2020, after the United States required that goods made in Hong Kong be labelled as "Made in China," Yau filed a complaint to the United States, stating that such a rule was unreasonable.

In January 2021, Yau said that a policy to require SIM card registration, where users of SIM cards would need to link their IDs, was necessary. In response, some sellers of pre-paid SIM cards said that they might lose their business, and that it would not prevent criminal activity, as criminals could use SIM cards from overseas. In May 2023, the government revealed that phone scams increased by 76% from the first quarter of 2022 to the first quarter of 2023.

In February 2021, Yau said that his bureau was investigating complaints into RTHK and that he had requested RTHK to conduct a thorough review of its programming. Following a report that said RTHK had "serious inadequacies" that required changes, Yau claimed that the government was not trying to weaken RTHK's editorial independence. In March 2021, after two people asked why some episodes on RTHK had been axed, Yau defended the decisions and said "There is no need for the public to discuss whether a programme should be screened or not."

In July 2021, Yau dismissed claims that the National Security Law would affect the city's creative freedom. In August 2021, Yau announced the introduction of a new film censorship law with punishments of up to three years in jail and fines of up to HK$1 million ($128,000) for anyone screening films containing material in violation of the new law. Yau claimed that the law would not compromise freedom of speech.

In August 2021, Yau defended his decision to allow Nicole Kidman to skip quarantine when flying from Australia to Hong Kong, when others, including residents of Hong Kong, must undergo hotel quarantine. Athletes representing Hong Kong also must quarantine. Yau later during a TV interview claimed that Kidman's trip to a clothing store could have been part of a "costume fitting".

== Education ==
Edward Yau graduated from the University of Hong Kong in 1981, and received further education at Oxford University and Harvard University.

Political offices
Preceded by Sarah Liao as Secretary for the Environment, Transport and Works	Secretary for the Environment; 2007–2012	Succeeded by Wong Kam-sing
Preceded by Gabriel Leung	Director of Chief Executive Office; 2012–2017	Succeeded by Eric Chan
Preceded by Gregory So	Secretary for Commerce and Economic Development; 2017–2022	Succeeded by Algernon Yau
