= Information Technology and Broadcasting Bureau =

The Information Technology and Broadcasting Bureau (Chinese: 資訊科技及廣播局, ITBB) is a former policy bureau of the Government of Hong Kong, which was responsible for managing Hong Kong's broadcasting services, developing the film industry, promoting Hong Kong's telecommunications, and providing support to the application of Information Technology within the Government. It was headed by Secretary for Information Technology and Broadcasting.

The bureau was established in April 1999 to replace the Broadcasting, Culture and Sport Bureau, and lasted until 1 July 2002, when it was merged with the Trade and Industry Bureau to form the Commerce, Industry and Technology Bureau.

== See also ==
- Government Secretariat (Hong Kong)
