= Society for Truth and Light =

Pressure group in Hong Kong

The Society For Truth And Light (STL, Chinese: 明光社) is a pressure group with an official mission of "address[ing] social ethics, media behaviour, and sex culture in Hong Kong" from a Christian Right point of view "to care the society and service people through research, monitoring, education and publishing."

However, it has been criticised due to its conservative stances on social issues which also criticize by some Christians. In a debate between the group and its opponents, the group was mocked as being "moral terrorists" attempting to "Talibanize" the community.

== History ==
The Society For Truth and Light was established in May 1997, led by Choi Chi-sum. The group positions itself as "conservative" and defines itself as the vanguard of upholding traditional values against the "trends of radical libertarianism, feminism and extreme individualism" in modern society. The society has opined on social problems concerning sex in recent years. For instance, it was quoted out of context in one newspaper that one of its founders believes that it is immoral for women to wear bikinis; and as Choi Chi-Sum as admitted in an interview, he believes that masturbation is immoral regardless of marital status . Gay rights groups and promoters of sex workers' rights associate the group with Christian Rightists in United States.

== Relationship with the authorities ==
While itself registered as a charity that raises fund through charity channels, the group received funding from government departments such as the Television and Entertainment Licensing Authority (TELA) of the Government of Hong Kong SAR through normal project bidding.

In a media report by the Next Magazine in June 2007, the reporter claimed that the founder and chief executive of the group, Choi Chi-Sum, admitted that TELA has channelled public funding to the group to generate complaints about "irresponsible media" through an orchestrated mass mailing campaign.

== Controversies ==
The Society For Truth And Light is criticised for using its relationship with the censorship authorities, such as the Broadcasting Authority (BA) and the Television and Entertainment Licensing Authority, to pursue the organisation's goal and mission.

=== An Autumn's Tale ===
An Autumn's Tale (Chinese: 秋天的童話), a Hong Kong classic movie, has been repeatedly broadcast at full length on local television. In 2007, when it was again broadcast on TVB Jade Channel, a Christian lodged a complaint to the Broadcasting Authority about the "vulgar language" in the movie. He argued that the movie was broadcast at a time when parents will not be home to provide parental guidance. The BA accepted his view and classified the film as "obscene" based on this complaint. In response, opposing groups launched a counter campaign generating 177 responses. TVB eventually removed the scene containing vulgar language. The decision of the BA provoked an outcry from the liberal groups, who called it 'stupid', 'complete absence of common sense', 'attacking freedom of expression'. Even though the complaint was not launched by the Society, it has been singled out for attacks.

The Legislative Council later held a meeting to discuss the decision of the Broadcasting Authority. The Society For Truth And Light, along with other Christian groups, defended the decision of the BA in the session. Under lobbying effort by gay rights, sex workers' rights and liberal Christian groups, the Council passed a motion on 'strongly urging Broadcasting Authority to withdraw its position'. though the Broadcasting Authority has remained intransigent.

=== RTHK TV documentary: Gay Lovers ===
In the same complaint as the Autumn's Tale incident, another group of Christians expressed disagreement with what they considered a biased viewpoint in a television documentary titled Gay Lovers (Chinese: 同志．戀人) and demanded that the issue should be discussed from different viewpoints. Produced by Radio Television Hong Kong, the show presented a report on the difficulties faced by gay couples as well as the issue of same-sex marriage in Hong Kong. The Broadcasting Authority ruled in favour of the complaint and published an admonition criticising RTHK for broadcasting content relating to homosexuality during family viewing hours.

In response to the decision, 160 counter-complaints have been filed by people who regard the judgment as unfair. The Legislative Council, in the same motion for An Autumn's Tale case, urged the Broadcasting Authority to withdraw its decision.

Following a lawsuit by the gay man depicted in the documentary, the Court of First Instance made an order of certiorari to quash the admonition of the Authority, and further declared that the Authority had no power to revisit its determination.

=== Gay rights ===
The Society For Truth And Light opposes gay rights and same-sex marriage because it claims that the inborn immutability and discrimination claimed by the gay and pro-gay activists are "invalid". Other than the society's belief in the biblical norms which it explicitly denies, it claims there is support from related "scientific and social research". On course of consultation on legislation against discrimination on sexuality by Hong Kong Government, the group paid for frontpage advertisements on newspapers explaining their stance. The advertisements were signed by medical professionals who positioned themselves to be experts in the study of sexually transmitted diseases, they implied that there is a link between homosexuality and paedophilia. The Society For Truth And Light has paid for advertisement space in the front and second pages of various newspaper for 23 consecutive days, amounting to an estimated cost of about $1 million Hong Kong dollars(approximately US$128,000). The proposed bill is then frozen by the government in response to "public sentiment".

The group oppose anti-discrimination law of sexual orientation. The group constantly maintains itself as a victim of so-called "reverse discrimination" in the gay rights issue. The concept of "reverse discrimination", in the group's context, means their right to discriminate against minority groups are being eroded (and hence "being discriminated").

=== Promoting 'Human rights' education ===
In October 2005, the society won a contract to produce teaching materials for human rights education in schools. It was awarded by the Education Bureau (then the Education and Manpower Bureau) of the Hong Kong SAR Government. This promoted massive controversy and opposition, and, after a number of complaints were received, the contract was not renewed.

=== Age of consent between two males ===
In August 2005, the government lost the case Leung TC William Roy v. Secretary for Justice, where the applicant had requested a judicial review by the High Court on the law related to age of consent on gay sex (which was being set to 21 at the time), on the ground that the provisions in Section 118, Crimes Ordinance is discriminatory and against both the Basic Law of Hong Kong and the Hong Kong Bill of Rights.

However, the government has decided to appeal against the ruling on the grounds of "public health". Eventually the appeal was turned down by the Court of Appeal and the government was ordered to pay the cost.

Gay activist and liberal groups again accused the group as a behind-the-scene player again without evidences.

=== Chinese University Student Press incident ===
The group criticised the content of Chinese University Student Press for including sex and violence, forced the OAT to make the decision, which the content of the magazine was indecent. Some groups against this decision because this may harmed the freedom of press.

=== G.O.D. Incidence ===
G.O.D, a designer furniture chain retailer, was raided by Hong Kong Police on 1 November 2007 for suspicion of selling triad-related T-shirts. The T-shirts bear the Traditional Chinese character "fourteen" (Chinese: 拾肆, Roman numeric: 14) and the English alphabet "K" (together, literally 14 000), which was a parody to a local triad bearing a similar name but in Roman numeric characters. As stated by the police, the printing carried by these T-shirts were contravening the section 151 of the Societies Ordinance.

However, sales of the T-shirts went unnoticed since its debut in September 2007 and did not catch public attention until an interview involving the Society for Truth and Light on 31 October 2007, who accused G.O.D. of glorifying triads and imposing a "negative" impact on children. The raid by the Hong Kong Police happened on the next day, right after the accusation by the Society for Truth and Light was published on Apple Daily.

Eighteen persons, including the designer, owners and other retail staff on duty, were arrested and later bailed. This caused an outcry from the "liberals" describing it as a white terror which "brutally crushed the freedom of expression" as being granted by the Basic Law of Hong Kong.

== See also ==
- Sexism
- Homophobia
- Family values
- Christian Fundamentalism
- Intelligent design movement
- Christian right
- Christian and Missionary Alliance
- Evangelical Free Church of China
