= Nicholas Yang =

Hong Kong politician and engineer

Nicholas Yang Wei-hsiung GBS, JP
- 楊偉雄
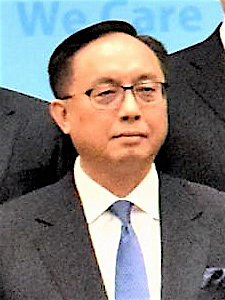

Secretary for Innovation and Technology
- In office 20 November 2015 – 22 April 2020
- Chief Executive: Leung Chun-ying; Carrie Lam
- Preceded by: Position established
- Succeeded by: Alfred Sit

Personal details
- Born: April 22, 1955 (age 70) Taiwan
- Education: California Institute of Technology (BS); Stanford University (MS, MBA)

Nicholas Yang Wei-hsiung, GBS, JP (Chinese: 楊偉雄, born 22 April 1955) is a Taiwanese-born Hong Kong politician and engineer and a former Non-official Member of the Executive Council. He is a former Executive Vice President of Hong Kong Polytechnic University and was the inaugural Secretary for Innovation and Technology, a post he held for five years to 2020.

== Education and business career ==
Yang lived in Jersey City, New Jersey, before moving to Pasadena to attend the California Institute of Technology. He graduated in 1977 with a bachelor's degree in electrical engineering. He went on to obtain a master's degree at Stanford University in the same field, and worked as a senior design engineer at Intel. He returned to Stanford to earn an MBA, and worked briefly at Bain & Company before moving to Asia in 1983.

He became a naturalized US citizen on 2 September 1977. On 15 December 1979 in Santa Clara, California, he married Winnie Sui-king Yung, daughter of the Chairman and founder of Hong Kong-based Shell Electric Manufacturing (蜆殼電器). She became a US citizen on 8 August 1984. Yang joined Shell Electric in 1983 and served as Executive Director until resigning on 30 September 2003. He was a director during its initial public offering and the sale of its fibre-optic business to JDSU. He moved to JDSU in 1999. Afterwards he became involved in venture capital and private equity. In 2003 he was appointed CEO of the Hong Kong Cyberport Management Company.

== In academia and government ==
Yang became Executive Vice President of the Hong Kong Polytechnic University in 2010. After CY Leung won the 2012 Hong Kong Chief Executive election, Yang was tipped to head the government's planned Technology and Communications Bureau, and in May he renounced his US citizenship, satisfying the Basic Law requirement that principal government officials have no right of abode in any foreign country.

In July 2012 Yang became the target of an investigation by the Independent Commission Against Corruption regarding a government contract which a foundation he directed, the eInclusion Foundation, had obtained in 2010.

In March 2015, he was appointed Innovation & Technology Adviser to Chief Executive CY Leung and a non-official member of the Executive Council, to pave the way for the creation of the city's Innovation and Technology Bureau (ITB), of which he was duly appointed the inaugural Secretary for Innovation and Technology on its formation in November 2015. He continued in the role in the administration of Carrie Lam but was removed from the post in a cabinet reshuffle in April 2020.

In April 2016, leaks from the Panama Papers showed that Yang had created two questionable accounts into which he had transferred a large number of PolyU stocks for his own benefit. Yang defended setting up the BVI firms as proper.

Political offices
New title	Secretary for Innovation and Technology; 2015–2020	Succeeded by Alfred Sit
