= Trade and Industry Bureau =

The Trade and Industry Bureau (Chinese: 工商局) is a former policy bureau of the Hong Kong Government, responsible for promoting Hong Kong's access to the world market, helping Hong Kong manufacturers remain competitive in international markets, enhancing the protection of intellectual property rights, and promoting Hong Kong customers' interests. It was headed by Secretary for Trade and Industry.

Established as the Trade and Industry Branch in 1982 from the then Economic Service Branch (Chinese: 經濟科), along with the defederalisation of the Trade, Industry and Customs Department, it was renamed a bureau on 1 July 1997 upon the transfer of sovereignty over Hong Kong, and lasted until July 1, 2000, when it was renamed and reorganised as the Commerce and Industry Bureau to reflect its expanded responsibilities in Hong Kong's industry and commerce. It was further renamed the Commerce, Industry and Technology Bureau in 2002.

== See also ==
- Government Secretariat (Hong Kong)
