= Sun Dong =

Chinese scientist (born 1967)

Prof The Honourable Sun Dong
- 孙东
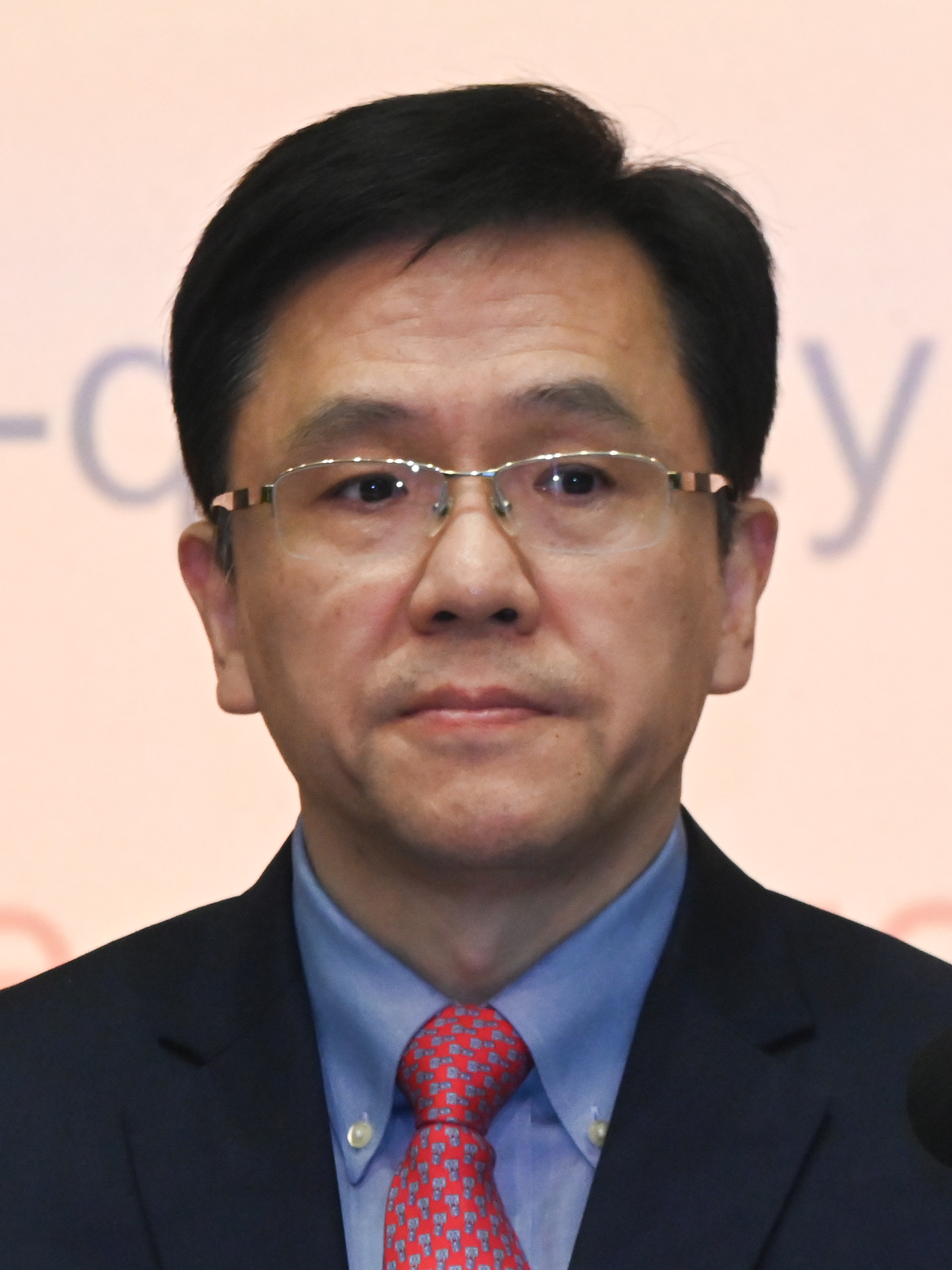
- Sun in 2025

Secretary for Innovation, Technology and Industry
- Incumbent
- Assumed office 1 July 2022
- Preceded by: Alfred Sit (as Secretary for Innovation and Technology)

Member of the Legislative Council
- In office 1 January 2022 – 18 June 2022
- Preceded by: New constituency
- Succeeded by: Shang Hailong
- Constituency: Election Committee

Personal details
- Born: 1967 (age 58–59) Beijing, China
- Citizenship: China (HK)
- Education: Tsinghua University; Chinese University of Hong Kong

Dong Sun (simplified Chinese: 孙东; traditional Chinese: 孫東; born 1967) is a Chinese scientist who is currently the Chair Professor and Head of the Department of Biomedical Engineering and Director of the Centre for Robotics and Automation at the City University of Hong Kong. He is also the Secretary for Innovation, Technology and Industry of the HKSAR Government. Sun's research focuses on microrobotics and biomedical engineering, and he specialises in robotic manipulation of cells for precision medicine.

Sun was named a Fellow of the Institute of Electrical and Electronics Engineers (IEEE) in 2015 "for contributions to robot-aided manipulation of biological cells". He is a Fellow of the Canadian Academy of Engineering and a Member of the European Academy of Sciences and Arts.

Sun founded a high-tech company at the Hong Kong Science Park, involved in technology transfers and conducting extensive applied researches in advanced robotics and motion controls with impactful contributions to industry and society. Sun and his company were recipients of Hong Kong Awards for Industry in 2004 and 2012.

== Actions as a public official ==
Dong Sun is an elected member of the Election Committee for the Technology and Innovation Constituency. During the 2021 Hong Kong legislative election, Sun was elected to the 7th Legislative Council of Hong Kong for the Election Committee (constituency).

Sun has advocated for Hong Kong's development as an international science and technology centre, creating synergistic development with the Greater Bay Area. Sun has promoted the “Matrix Model of Science and Technology Innovation", calling for an integrated science and technology ecosystem supporting impactful scientific research, accelerated technology transfer, and the strengthening of competitive industries.

In January 2022, Sun was one of three people, out of 90 legislative council members, who took his oath using Mandarin rather than the local language, Cantonese.

In June 2022, Sun was appointed Secretary for Innovation, Technology and Industry of the HKSAR Government, assuming office on 1 July 2022, making him the first bureau secretary of Hong Kong from mainland China.

On 8 October 2022, Sun defended the mandatory use of the LeaveHomeSafe app for digital contact tracing, and said "We use the LeaveHomeSafe app system to support the government's anti-pandemic policies very successfully." The app, which had become controversial for its location tracking and the revelation in May 2022 that it contained a facial recognition system, was discontinued and withdrawn from use three months later.

On 23 October 2022, Sun said that Hong Kong was lagging behind other cities and said the next few years will be Hong Kong's last chance to become a global innovation and tech hub.

In November 2022, Sun met with employees of Google and "mounted solemn negotiations" about the search engine's ranking of the protest song "Glory to Hong Kong". Sun requested that Google "remove wrong information from the search results". In March 2023, Sun said "We have been in negotiation many times hoping it would remove the wrong information, but it is regrettable that it has not taken corresponding measures."

In July 2023, Sun said that Google had asked him to provide proof that "Glory To Hong Kong" was illegal, and the Hong Kong government filed a motion to make it illegal; Sun said "Very well, since you brought up a legal issue, let's use legal means to solve the problem." In July 2023, the High Court rejected the proposed ban on the song.

In August 2023, Sun said that he had "suffered a lot of pressure" from Kenneth Lau, over Lau's insistence to integrate villages into the San Tin Technopole plan.

In May 2024, after the government set up an HK$2.8 billion fund for a semiconductor center in Hong Kong, Sun said that the government hoped Hong Kong would turn into a regional leader in semiconductors.

== Education ==
- Ph.D., Robotics and Automation, Chinese University of Hong Kong
- M.S., Precision Instrument and Biomedical Engineering, Tsinghua University, Beijing, China
- B.Sc., Precision Instrument and Mechanology, Tsinghua University, Beijing, China

== Research fields ==
- Cell-based bioengineering
- Multirobot system
- Mechatronics and Motion controls

Legislative Council of Hong Kong
New title	Member of Legislative Council; Representative for Election Committee; 2022	Succeeded by Shang Hailong
