= Alfred Sit =

Hong Kong politician (born 1962)

Alfred Sit Wing-hang GBS JP
- 薛永恒
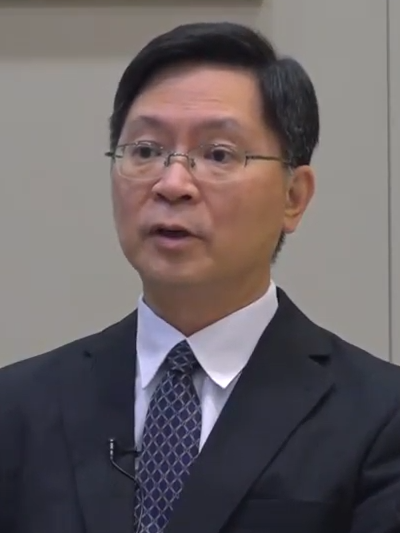

Secretary for Innovation and Technology
- In office 22 April 2020 – 30 June 2022
- Chief Executive: Carrie Lam
- Preceded by: Nicholas Yang
- Succeeded by: Sun Dong (Secretary for Innovation, Technology and Industry)

Director of Electrical and Mechanical Services
- In office 13 October 2017 – 22 April 2020
- Secretary for Development: Michael Wong
- Preceded by: Frank Chan
- Succeeded by: Pang Yiu-hung

Personal details
- Born: 1962 (age 63–64) British Hong Kong
- Education: Tang King Po School; Hong Kong Polytechnic; Chinese University of Hong Kong

Alfred Sit Wing-hang, GBS, JP (Chinese: 薛永恒; born 1962) is a Hong Kong government official. Since 2020, he served as Secretary for Innovation and Technology from 2020 to 2022.

Sit joined the Hong Kong government as an Assistant Electrical and Mechanical Engineer in September 1984 and was promoted to Chief Electrical and Mechanical Engineer in August 2001. He was subsequently promoted to Government Electrical and Mechanical Engineer in December 2007 and to Deputy Director of Electrical and Mechanical Services in September 2011. He rose to Director of Electrical and Mechanical Services in October 2017.

Sit was president of the Hong Kong Institute of Facility Management, the chairman of the Biomedical Division, and the honorary secretary of the Nuclear Division of the Hong Kong Institution of Engineers.

In April 2020, Chief Executive Carrie Lam appointed him Secretary for Innovation and Technology, succeeding Nicholas Yang.

Political offices
Preceded by Nicholas Yang	Secretary for Innovation and Technology; 2020–2022	Succeeded by Dong Sun (Secretary for Innovation, Technology and Industry)
