= Michael Rowse =

Hong Kong civil servant (born 1948)

- 盧維思
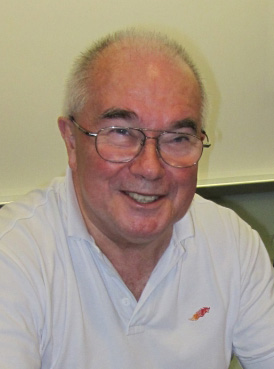
- Rowse in 2010

Director General of InvestHK
- In office 1 July 2001 – 18 December 2008
- Preceded by: Office created
- Succeeded by: Simon Galpin

Personal details
- Born: 21 December 1948 (age 77) England
- Spouse: Fanny Wong
- Children: 4 Vincent Rowse Victor Rowse Tiffany Rowse Alexander Rowse
- Website: rowse.com.hk

Michael Rowse
- Traditional Chinese: 盧維思
- Simplified Chinese: 卢维思
Transcriptions
Standard Mandarin
- Hanyu Pinyin: Lú Wéisī
Yue: Cantonese
- Jyutping: lou4 wai4 si1

Michael John Treloar "Mike" Rowse (Chinese: 盧維思, born 21 December 1948) is a Hong Kong public figure. A naturalised citizen of the People's Republic of China, Rowse was the director-general of InvestHK, a department of the Hong Kong Government.

Rowse was one of the few foreign-born civil servants in the post-handover Hong Kong Government. He is best known for having negotiated the Hong Kong Disneyland deal on behalf of the government in November 1999 in which the government became the park's largest shareholder; he thus received the nickname "Mickey Rowse", an allusion to the Disney character. Rowse then set up InvestHK, and was appointed its director general on 1 July 2000. As head of the agency, he became involved in Harbour Fest, an event to promote Hong Kong in the aftermath of the SARS outbreak in 2003 which became a topic of controversy due to its cost over-runs.

== Early life and career ==
Rowse was born to a working-class family in England. He and a friend developed plans to travel the world; his friend backed out. At the age of 23, and living in Isleworth at the time, Rowse set off over land in August 1971. He got first stuck in Bangkok, where he worked for several months officially as a "secretary" in a certain "Atlanta Club", which was in fact a low-budged guesthouse in Soi 2, Sukhumvit Road, and had originally been registered as a Hotel until 1968. Rowse wrote his first articles and letters during this time for English language Thai newspapers and was also a proof-reader for Max Henn, a well-known German entrepreneur with a fake PhD, who was the founder of this guesthouse and himself an author of numerous political comments for the then newly founded English-language daily The Nation. The last piece written by Rowse in Bangkok appeared in The Nation in November 1972. Rowse eventually arrived in Hong Kong at the end of 1972, according to the official biography on his homepage. He recounts in an interview with HK Online that upon his arrival, he lived in a 36 square feet (3.3 m^{2}) room in an apartment shared with three Indonesian Chinese families.

He worked as a reporter for The Star for 16 months, covering corruption and crime, and in 1974, joined the Hong Kong ICAC, where he worked in both the Operations and Corruption Prevention Departments. Taking the decision to stay permanently in Hong Kong, he settled down, married and, in 1980, he joined the Hong Kong Government as an Administrative Officer. Rowse was made the first director of the Financial Secretary's Office, a post he occupied from 1997 to 2000 under then Financial Secretary, Donald Tsang. From 1999 to 2000, he was the first Commissioner for Tourism.

In November 1999, Rowse negotiated the Hong Kong Disneyland Resort deal on behalf of the government in which the government became the park's largest shareholder; he then set up InvestHK, and was appointed its director general on 1 July 2000. As head of the agency, he became involved in HarbourFest, an event to promote Hong Kong in the aftermath of the SARS outbreak in 2003 which became a political scandal.

=== Harbour Fest controversy ===
The Harbour Fest was a Government underwritten event in late 2003 as part of a HK$1 billion program to revive the economy after SARS. It was organised by InvestHK in collaboration with the American Chamber of Commerce.

In the aftermath, Rowse was held responsible for failing to ensure that InvestHK critically examine the HarbourFest budget, and fully and adequately advise the working group on the finances. Consequently, he was fined one month's salary in October 2005. Legislator Cheung Man-kwong criticised the government for making Rowse a scapegoat for ministerial failure. Columnist Jake van der Kamp felt that Rowse had been let down by Donald Tsang, whose responsibility as Chief Secretary it ultimately was to oversee the Harbour Fest expenditure.

=== Court ruling ===
In July 2008, Rowse won his judicial review against the government's decision to fine him HK$156,000 for his role in organising Harbour Fest. The judge found there to have been a breach of the rule of fairness: as the threshold of the burden of proof was set too low, the committee's findings should not have been relied upon by the Secretary for the Civil Service. He further ruled that Donald Tsang had acted outside his powers in deciding to delegate his decision under the administration order to the Chief Secretary. The government allowed its right to appeal the decision to lapse on 12 September 2008, but said that the case would not affect the civil service disciplinary system as a whole. Rowse said that the trials to clear his name cost him HK$3 million.

=== Book ===
In December 2008, Rowse declared that he would in due course publish his own account of the events surrounding the debacle. In November 2009, Rowse released the book, entitled "No Minister and No, Minister: The True Story of HarbourFest ", in which he was highly critical of Henry Tang's silence over the "inappropriate assignment" of an entertainment event to the investment promotion agency (InvestHK) and for shirking his political responsibility. The Civil Service Bureau (CSB) wrote to Rowse a few days before the expected date of publication to remind him that, as a retired directorate-level official, the civil service rules governing potential conflicts of interest required its approval for outside work, including book publishing. In his personal website, Rowse said the book was "not written with the intention of absolving myself of any blame for the problems that arose, nor to point the finger at others. Rather, I have sought to set out what I did and didn’t do, and why."

== Personal ==
After the return of Hong Kong to Chinese sovereignty, Rowse, who was already a Hong Kong permanent resident, decided to stay and continue to work as a civil servant. In August 2001, Rowse was the first non-Chinese civil servant to become a naturalised citizen of the People's Republic of China

Rowse divorced from his first wife, with whom he had two sons, now adult. He is married to Fanny Wong, a former journalist now a communications consultant. The couple have one daughter and one son.

Rowse received the PRWeek 'Communicator of the Year Award' in November 2001.

In May 2010, Rowse became a search director at recruitment specialist, Stanton Chase International, after receiving CSB clearance.
