= Hong Kong Export Credit Insurance Corporation =

- Type: Statutory organisation
- Founded: 1966
- Headquarters: 2/F., Tower 1, South Seas Centre, 75 Mody Road, Tsimshatsui East, Kowloon, Hong Kong
- Key people: Professor Dr Dennis Ng Wang-pun, Chairman; Terence Chiu, Commissioner
- Website: hkecic.com

The Hong Kong Export Credit Insurance Corporation was established in 1966 under the Hong Kong Export Credit Insurance Corporation Ordinance (Chapter 1115). It was created by statute with the aim of encouraging and supporting export trade by providing Hong Kong exporters with insurance protection against non-payment risks arising from commercial and political events. Its contingent liability under contracts of insurance is guaranteed by the Government of the Hong Kong Special Administrative Region, with the statutory maximum liability currently standing at $80 billion. The corporation is required to operate in accordance with the requirements laid down in the Hong Kong Export Credit Insurance Corporation Ordinance and to pursue a policy directed towards securing revenue sufficient to meet all expenditure properly chargeable to its revenue account. It is a 'public body' under the Prevention of Bribery Ordinance. HKECIC staff are not permitted to accept any advantages from HKECIC customers. Anybody offering any advantages to HKECIC staff in connection with official business commits an offence.

== Corporate Governance ==
The Hong Kong Export Credit Insurance Corporation (HKECIC) is a statutory organisation governed by the Hong Kong Export Credit Insurance Corporation Ordinance (Chapter 1115) (HKECIC Ordinance).

== Management ==
- Commissioner:Terence Chiu
- General manager:Cynthia Chin
- Deputy General Managers:Queenie Chan, Eric Leung

== Advisory Board ==
In the general consideration of its insurance and investment-related business, the corporation is advised by an advisory board. Membership includes leaders from the finance, insurance, trade and services sectors and government officials.
