= Choi Chi-sum =

Choi Chi-sum (Chinese: 蔡志森; born April 14, 1960) is an outspoken far right evangelical in Hong Kong.

Choi was baptized in 1978 and graduated from Hong Kong Baptist University in 1982.

Choi is the General Secretary of the Christian Conservative Society For Truth And Light and has been vice-chairperson of the China Holiness Church in Hong Kong since 1998.
