= InvestHK =

Department of the Hong Kong SAR Government

- 投資推廣署

Agency overview
- Formed: 2000
- Jurisdiction: Government of Hong Kong
- Headquarters: 24/F, Fairmont House, 8 Cotton Tree Drive, Central, Hong Kong
- Agency executives: Alpha Lau, Director-General of Investment Promotion; Jimmy Chiang, Associate Director-General of Investment Promotion; Charles Ng, Associate Director-General of Investment Promotion
- Parent department: Commerce and Economic Development Bureau
- Website: Official Website

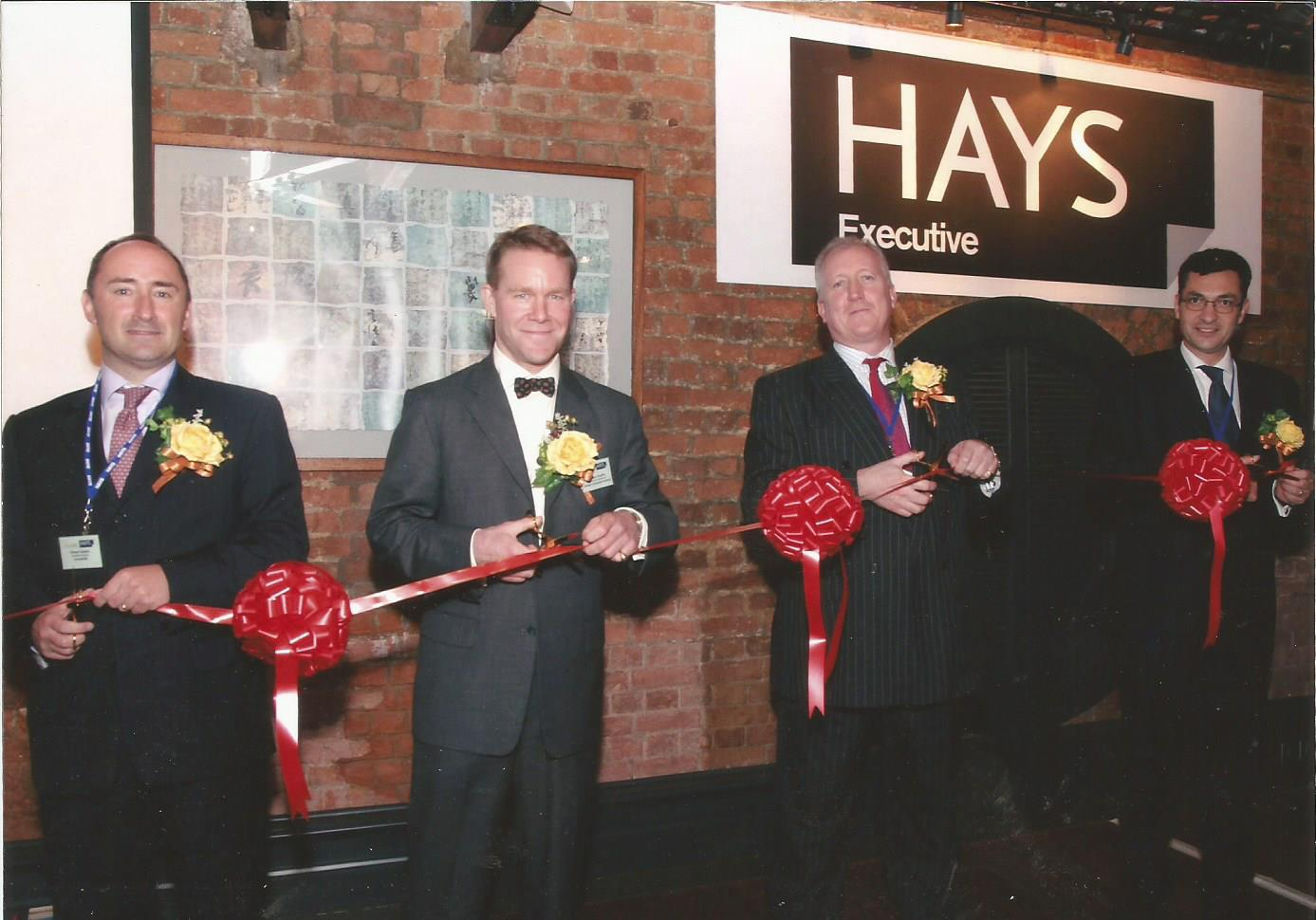
Simon Galpin (at the time the Deputy-Head of Invest HK), Stephen Bradley (the British Consul General in Hong Kong), Andy McRae (a Director of Hays plc) and Nigel Cumberland (a co-founder of St. George's Harvey Nash) at an official ceremony held at Hong Kong's Foreign Correspondents' Club in June 2006 to celebrate Hays plc buying St George's Harvey Nash

Invest Hong Kong (Chinese: 投資推廣署) is the department of the Hong Kong SAR Government responsible for Foreign Direct Investment, supporting overseas businesses to set up and expand in Hong Kong. Founded on 1 July 2000, its first Director General was Michael Rowse.

The Investment Officers are organised into 11 specialist sector teams: Business & Professional Services; Consumer Products; Creative Industries, Sports & Entertainment; Family Office; Financial Services; FinTech; Innovation & Technology; Life & Health Sciences; Sustainability; Tourism & Hospitality; Transport, Logistics and Industrials.

Invest HK is headed by the Director-General of Investment Promotion who reports to the Secretary for Commerce and Economic Development.

== Director-General of Investment Promotion ==
=== Alpha Lau ===
The current Director-General of Investment Promotion is Alpha Lau. Under Lau's leadership, the agency has focused on promoting Hong Kong as a location for corporate headquarters, family offices, and technology companies. For the first half of 2024, InvestHK reported assisting over 300 companies in establishing or expanding operations in Hong Kong, with investments totaling approximately HK$38 billion.

=== Stephen Phillips ===
The former Director-General of Investment Promotion was Stephen Phillips. In August 2022, Phillips went to Australia and New Zealand to market Hong Kong's business attractions. In November 2022, despite the 0+3 restrictions for inbound travellers, Phillips said that "Hong Kong is well and truly back open for business."

In March 2022, Phillips claimed that the National Security Law was not a big concern for companies while investing in Hong Kong.

== Major events ==
=== Hong Kong FinTech Week ===
Hong Kong FinTech Week is an international fintech event, organised by InvestHK. It is held in Hong Kong and Shenzhen.

Hong Kong FinTech Week brings together fintech communities from the East and the West that seek to expand their businesses to Hong Kong, mainland China and the Asia-Pacific region.

=== Gay Games ===
In September 2023, South China Morning Post reported that although InvestHK was a sponsor of the 2023 Gay Games, it had not provided support to the event.

== See also ==
- Investment promotion agency
- Hong Kong Trade Development Council
- China Investment Promotion Agency
