= Hong Kong Broadcasting Authority =

- 廣播事務管理局
- Abbreviation: HKBA
- Successor: Communications Authority
- Formation: 1987
- Dissolved: 2012
- Merger of: Television and Entertainment Licensing Authority; Office of the Telecommunications Authority
- Website: Official website

Hong Kong Broadcasting Authority
- Traditional Chinese: 廣播事務管理局
Transcriptions
Yue: Cantonese
- Yale Romanization: Gwóng bo sih mouh gún léih gúk
- Jyutping: Gwong2 bo3 si6 mou6 gun2 lei5 guk2

HKBA
- Traditional Chinese: 廣管局
Transcriptions
Yue: Cantonese
- Yale Romanization: Gwóng gún gúk
- Jyutping: Gwong2 gun2 guk2

The Hong Kong Broadcasting Authority (HKBA) was an organisation responsible for licensing and regulating the broadcasting industry in Hong Kong. It was formed in 1987. The organisation was authorised to investigate complaints made regarding programmes, issue warnings and fines, or even suspend the license of the radio or television station.

Since April 2012, Hong Kong Broadcasting Authority, along with Television and Entertainment Licensing Authority and Office of the Telecommunications Authority was merged to form the Communications Authority.

== Comparisons ==
Similar bodies around the world are:

- Australia: Australian Communications and Media Authority
- Canada: Canadian Radio-television and Telecommunications Commission (CRTC)
- France: Superior Audiovisual Council (formerly the ORTF)
- United Kingdom: Ofcom
- United States: Federal Communications Commission (FCC)

== See also ==
- Television and Entertainment Licensing Authority
