= Chinese University Student Press =

Hong Kong student magazine

Chinese University Student Press (CUSP, 中大學生報) is a magazine published by the Chinese University of Hong Kong Students' Union. The CUSP is considered a liberal magazine as it sparked controversy because of its publication of the sex column.
