= Algernon Yau =

Hong Kong politician

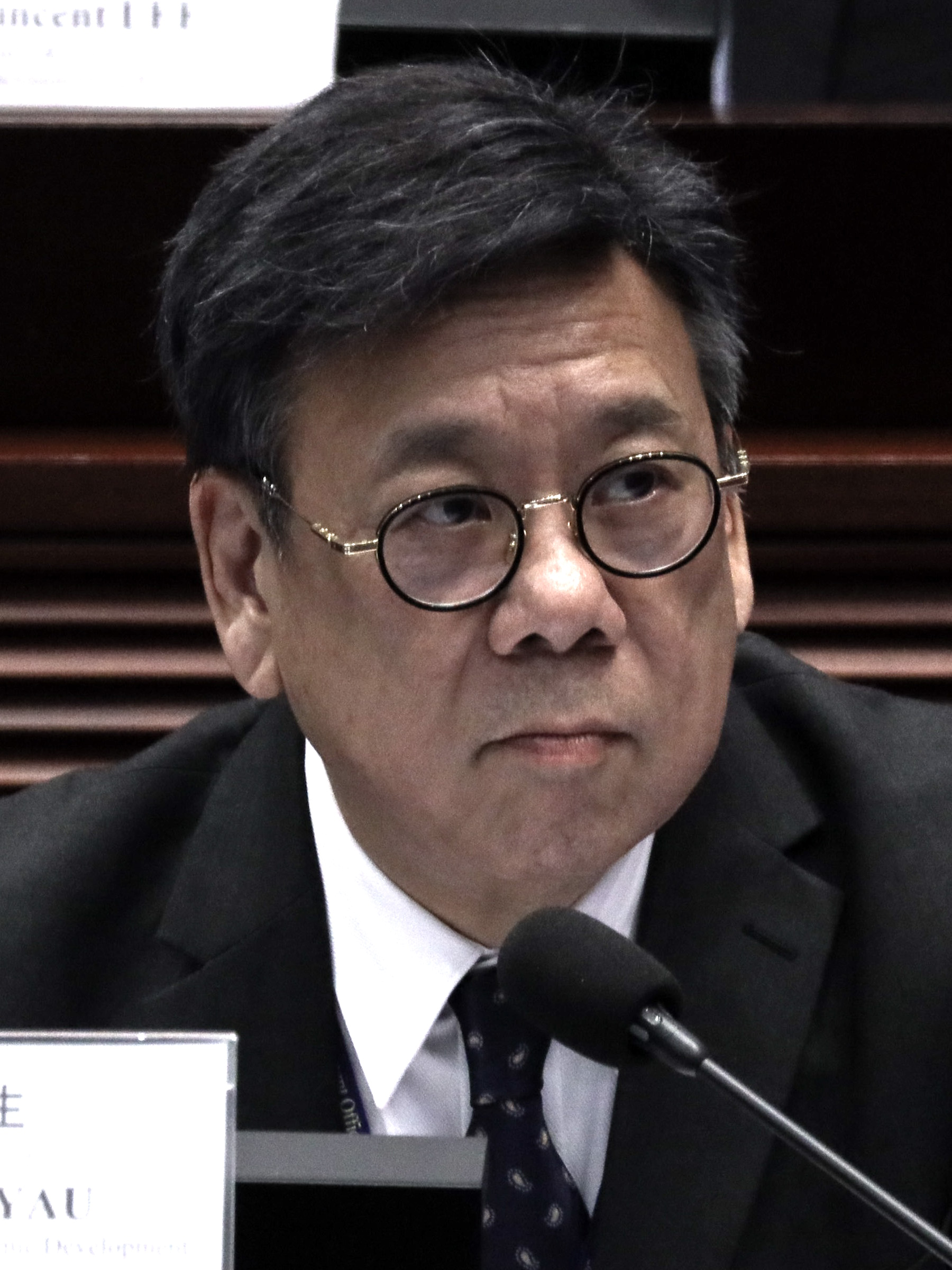
- Yau in 2023

Secretary for Commerce and Economic Development in Hong Kong
- Incumbent
- Assumed office 1 July 2022
- Appointed by: John Lee
- Preceded by: Edward Yau

Personal details
- Born: 1959 (age 66–67) British Hong Kong
- Relatives: Qiu Fengjia (grandfather)
- Education: Royal Melbourne Institute of Technology University

Algernon Yau Ying-wah
- Traditional Chinese: 丘應樺
- Simplified Chinese: 丘应桦
Transcriptions
Standard Mandarin
- Hanyu Pinyin: Qiū Yīnghuà
Yue: Cantonese
- Jyutping: jau1 jing3 waa4

Algernon Yau Ying-wah JP (Chinese: 丘應樺; born 1959) is the current Secretary for Commerce and Economic Development in Hong Kong, appointed on 1 July 2022 as part of John Lee's administration.

== Biography ==
Yau is the grandson of late Qing Taiwanese Hakka patriot Qiu Fengjia.

In his professional life, he was CEO of Cathay Dragon, before becoming CEO of Greater Bay Airlines. Yau studied at the Royal Melbourne Institute of Technology University.

On 1 July 2022, he was appointed the Secretary for Commerce and Economic Development.

In September 2022, Yau said he was confident that the November 2022 Global Financial Leaders' Investment Summit in Hong Kong would be successful; top financial executives who were invited made quarantine-free travel to the city a mandatory precondition.

In December 2022, Yau said the number of international companies in Hong Kong had fallen to below 9,000 for the first time since 2019, with a further 3% surveyed planning to relocate, and another 16% uncertain about their plans.

In September 2023, Yau said that foreign companies that left during COVID-19 "have all returned" to Hong Kong.

In December 2023, Yau appealed to the US government to stop a proposed bill that would strip HKETO offices in the US of special privileges.

=== National Security Law ===
In September 2022, Yau said it was important to tell the Hong Kong story accurately, and said that some news reports were inaccurate on Hong Kong's freedoms after the National Security Law was passed.

=== COVID-19 ===
In September 2022, in response to Hong Kong and quarantine-free travel, Yau claimed that the government uses a pragmatic approach and will make a science-based decision.

=== Made in China ===
In December 2022, the WTO had ruled that the United States is in breach of international trade rules by requiring all products made in Hong Kong to be marked as "Made in China". Yau criticised the US ban hours after the WTO ruling, and stated of the US actions that it was "politically motivated and a vain attempt to interfere with Hong Kong's internal affairs through weaponizing trade." Yau asserted that Hong Kong sends only a tiny portion of its exports to the US and so "the value of the trade is not the point." He said that the move by the United States had "confused" customers and that his "government's successful challenge to a US ban on the 'Made in Hong Kong' label is a matter of upholding the SAR's separate status in the World Trade Organisation."

== Personal life ==
In August 2022, he tested positive for COVID-19. In December 2022, a family member tested positive for COVID-19, and Yau underwent home quarantine.
