= Secretary for Commerce and Economic Development =

Position of the Hong Kong Government

Hong Kong Special Administrative Region Secretary for the Commerce and Economic Development 商務及經濟發展局局長
- Emblem of Hong Kong

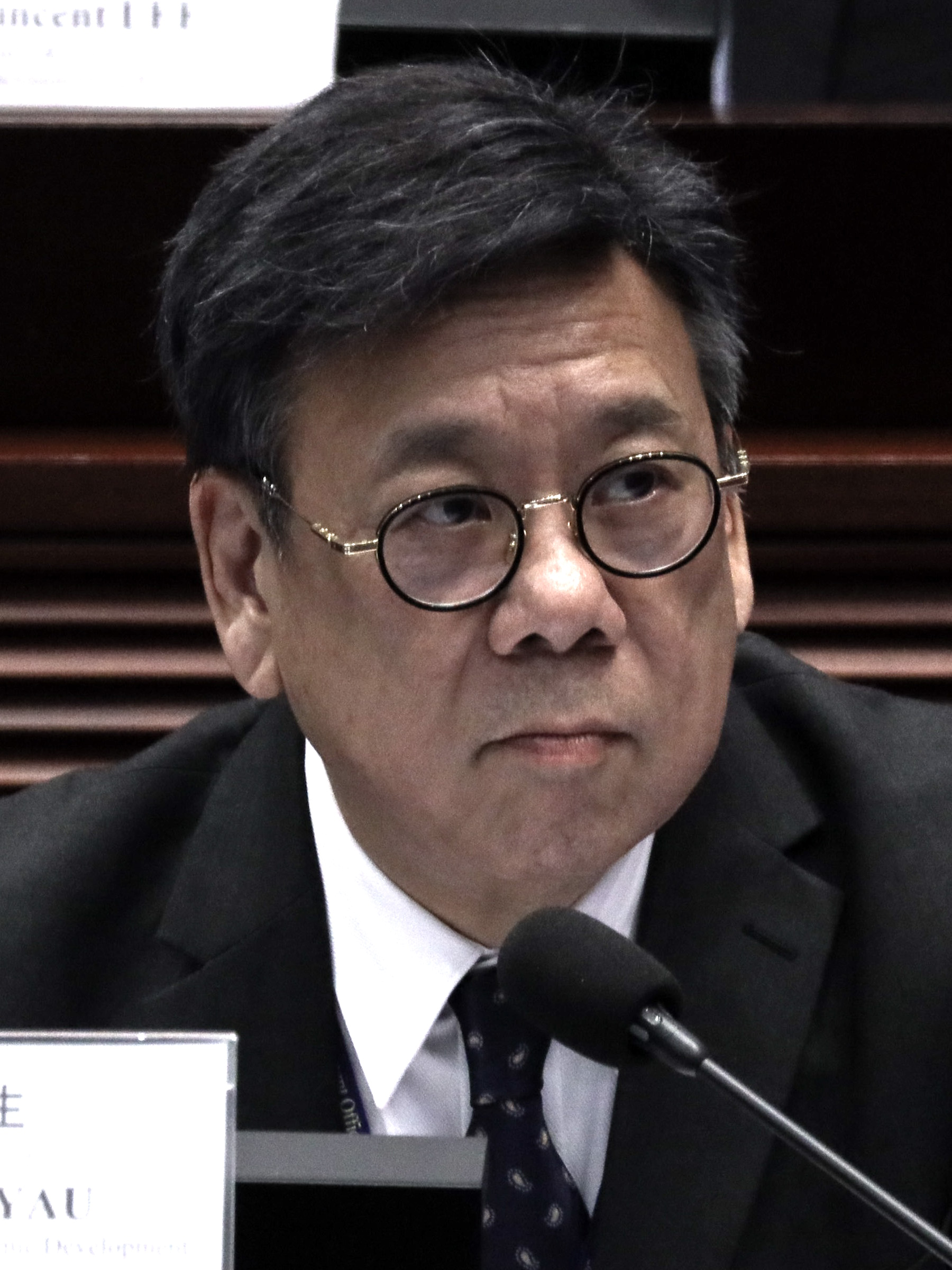
- Incumbent; Algernon Yau since 1 July 2022
- Commerce and Economic Development Bureau
- Style: The Honourable
- Appointer: Central People's Government nomination by Chief Executive
- Inaugural holder: Stephen Ip; Secretary for Economic Services; Frederick Ma; Secretary for Commerce & Economic Development
- Formation: 1 July 1997; 1 July 2007
- Salary: HK$4,021,200 per annum
- Website: CEDB

Secretary for Commerce and Economic Development
- Traditional Chinese: 商務及經濟發展局局長
- Simplified Chinese: 商务及经济发展局局长
Transcriptions
Standard Mandarin
- Hanyu Pinyin: Shāngwù jí Jīngjìfāzhǎn Jú Kúzhǎng
Yue: Cantonese
- Yale Romanization: Sēung mouh kahp gīng jai faat jín guhk guhk jéung
- Jyutping: Soeng^{1} mou^{6} kap^{6} ging^{1} zai^{3} faat^{3} zin^{2} guk^{6} guk^{6} zoeng^{2}

The Secretary for Commerce and Economic Development heads the Commerce and Economic Development Bureau of the Hong Kong Government. The Secretary is responsible for promoting commerce and the economic development of Hong Kong. The position was created in 2007 by merging the previous portfolios of the Secretary for Commerce, Industry and Technology and the Secretary for Economic Development and Labour.

The predecessor, Secretary for Trade and Industry (Chinese: 工商局局長), was the head of the Trade and Industry Branch, and later the Trade and Industry Bureau, responsible for securing Hong Kong's access to the world market, helping Hong Kong manufacturers remain competitive in international markets, enhancing the protection of intellectual property rights, and promoting Hong Kong customers' interests. It was renamed and re-organised as the Secretary for Commerce and Industry in 2000, and replaced by the Secretary for Commerce, Industry and Technology (Chinese: 工商及科技局局長) in 2002, with new responsibilities of technology sectors after merging with Secretary for Information Technology and Broadcasting.

== List of office holders ==
=== Secretaries for Trade and Industry, 1982–1997 ===
No.	Portrait	Name	Term of office		Governor	Ref
1		William Dorward 杜華	August 1982	February 1983	Sir Edward Youde (1982–1986)	
2		Eric Peter Ho 何鴻鑾	February 1983	1987	Sir Edward Youde (1982–1986)	
2		Eric Peter Ho 何鴻鑾	February 1983	1987	Sir David Wilson (1987–1992)	
3		Hamish Macleod 麥高樂	1987	1989	Sir David Wilson (1987–1992)	
4		John Chan 陳祖澤	1989	1991	Sir David Wilson (1987–1992)	
5		Brian Chau 周德熙	20 May 1991	November 1995	Sir David Wilson (1987–1992)	
5		Brian Chau 周德熙	20 May 1991	November 1995	Chris Patten (1992–1997)	
6		Denise Yue 俞宗怡	November 1995	30 June 1997	Chris Patten (1992–1997)	

=== Secretaries for Trade and Industry, 1997–2000 ===
No.	Portrait	Name	Term of office		Duration	Chief Executive	Term	Ref
1		Denise Yue Chung-yee 俞宗怡	1 July 1997	30 March 1998	272 days	Tung Chee-hwa (1997–2005)	1	
2		Brian Chau Tak-hay 周德熙	31 March 1998	30 June 2000	2 years, 121 days	Tung Chee-hwa (1997–2005)	1	

=== Secretaries for Commerce and Industry, 2000–2002 ===
No.	Portrait	Name	Term of office		Duration	Chief Executive	Term	Ref
1		Brian Chau Tak-hay 周德熙	1 July 2000	30 June 2002	1 year, 364 days	Tung Chee-hwa (1997–2005)	1	

=== Secretaries for Commerce, Industry and Technology, 2002–2007 ===
No.	Portrait	Name	Term of office		Duration	Chief Executive	Term	Ref
1		Henry Tang Ying-yen 唐英年	1 July 2002	3 August 2003	1 year, 364 days	Tung Chee-hwa (1997–2005)	2	
		John Tsang Chun-wah 曾俊華	4 August 2003	24 January 2006	2 years, 173 days	Tung Chee-hwa (1997–2005)	2	
		John Tsang Chun-wah 曾俊華	4 August 2003	24 January 2006	2 years, 173 days	Donald Tsang (2005–2012)	2	
		Joseph Wong Wing-ping 王永平	24 January 2006	30 June 2007	1 year, 157 days	Donald Tsang (2005–2012)	2	

=== Secretaries for Commerce and Economic Development, 2007–present ===
Political party: Nonpartisan Democratic Alliance for the Betterment and Progress of Hong Kong (DAB)

No.	Portrait	Name	Term of office		Duration	Chief Executive	Term	Ref
1		Frederick Ma Si-hang 馬時亨	1 July 2007	11 July 2008	1 year, 10 days	Donald Tsang (2005–2012)	3	
2		Rita Lau Ng Wai-lan 劉吳惠蘭	12 July 2008	13 April 2011	2 years, 275 days	Donald Tsang (2005–2012)	3	
3		Gregory So Kam-leung 蘇錦樑	28 June 2011	30 June 2017	6 years, 2 days	Donald Tsang (2005–2012)	3	
3		Gregory So Kam-leung 蘇錦樑	28 June 2011	30 June 2017	6 years, 2 days	Leung Chun-ying (2012–2017)	4	
4		Edward Yau Tang-wah 邱騰華	1 July 2017	30 June 2022	5 years, 0 days	Carrie Lam (2017–2022)	5	
5		Algernon Yau Ying-wah 丘應樺	1 July 2022	Incumbent	4 years, 68 days	John Lee (2022–present)	6	
