= Office of the Communications Authority =

Executive arm of Communications Authority in Hong Kong

- 通訊事務管理局辦公室

Agency overview
- Formed: 1 April 2012
- Preceding agency: Office of the Telecommunications Authority
- Headquarters: Wan Chai, Hong Kong
- Employees: 320
- Annual budget: HK$320.9 million revenue, HK$92.6 million profit
- Agency executives: Marion Lai Chan Chi-kuen, Director-General; Ha Yung-kuen, Deputy Director-General
- Website: ofca.gov.hk

Office of the Communications Authority
- Traditional Chinese: 通訊事務管理局辦公室
Transcriptions
Yue: Cantonese
- Yale Romanization: Tūng seun sih mouh gún léih guhk baahn gūng sāt
- Jyutping: Tung1 seon3 si6 mou6 gun2 lei5 guk6 baan6 gung1 sat1

The Office of the Communications Authority (OFCA) is an executive arm of the Communications Authority in Hong Kong. It is the body responsible for telecommunications regulation (through the Regulatory Affairs Branch), antitrust enforcement (through the Competition Affairs Branch) and allocation of the radio frequency portion of the electromagnetic spectrum (also known as spectrum management, through the Operations Branch).

The OFTA, the Television and Entertainment Licensing Authority, and the Hong Kong Broadcasting Authority was merged to form the Office of the Communications Authority and the Communications Authority on 1 April 2012. The Office for Film, Newspaper and Article Administration under OFCA also formed in the same day, takes over former Television and Entertainment Licensing Authority's other functions in relation to film classification, control of obscene and indecent articles and newspaper registration.

== See also ==
- Television and Entertainment Licensing Authority
- Hong Kong Broadcasting Authority
