= Communications Authority =

Statutory body in Hong Kong

- 通訊事務管理局

Statutory body overview
- Formed: 1 April 2012
- Preceding agencies: Broadcasting Authority; Television and Entertainment Licensing Authority; Telecommunications Authority
- Type: Statutory body
- Jurisdiction: Hong Kong
- Headquarters: Wu Chung House, 213 Queen's Road East, Wan Chai
- Minister responsible: Winnie TAM Wan-chi, SC, Chairman
- Deputy Minister responsible: Eliza LEE Man-ching Permanent Secretary for Commerce and Economic Development (Communications and Creative Industries)
- Key document: Communications Authority Ordinance (Cap. 616)
- Website: coms-auth.hk

Communications Authority
- Traditional Chinese: 通訊事務管理局
Transcriptions
Yue: Cantonese
- Yale Romanization: Tūng suen sih mouh gún léih gúk
- Jyutping: Tung^{1} syun^{3} si^{6} mou^{6} gun^{2} lei^{5} guk^{2}

The Communications Authority is a statutory body responsible for licensing and regulating the broadcasting and telecommunications industries in Hong Kong. It was formed in 2012 through a merger of the Hong Kong Broadcasting Authority, Television and Entertainment Licensing Authority, and the Telecommunications Authority. The organisation is authorized to investigate complaints made regarding programmes, issue warnings and fines, or even suspend the license of the radio or television station.

The authority enforces the Broadcasting Ordinance (Cap. 562), the Telecommunications Ordinance (Cap. 106), the Unsolicited Electronic Messages Ordinance (Cap. 593), Communications Authority Ordinance, and the Broadcasting (Miscellaneous Provisions) Ordinance (Cap. 391).

The regulatory agency is ostensibly independent of the government, but its executive functions are supported by the Office of the Communications Authority (OFCA), a government department with a self-funding trust structure.

== History ==
In 2020, the Communications Authority issued a statement against RTHK concerning a comedy show for purportedly "denigrating and insulting" the Hong Kong Police Force.

In 2023, the agency recommended to the Chief Executive that free-to-air broadcasters transmit 30 minutes of patriotic and national security programming every week; the Chief Executive, John Lee, accepted the idea and made it mandatory.

In July 2023, the agency proposed that national security media be exempt from a requirement that programs be impartial with "even-handedness," as well as certain media from mainland China.

== Structure ==
The CA is headed by a chair and 11 other members:

The current Board of the CA consist of:

- Winnie TAM Wan-chi, SC - Chair
- Eliza LEE Man-ching, JP - Vice-chair
- Karen CHAN Ka-yin, JP
- Stephen HUNG Wan-shun
- Yvonne LAW SHING Mo-han, BBS, JP
- Thomas LO Sui-sing, JP
- Hubert NG Ching-wah
- Anthony William SEETO Yiu-wai
- Benjamin TANG Kwok-bun, GBS
- XU Yan
- Ray YEP Kin-man
- Agnes WONG Tin-yu, JP

=== List of Chairman ===
- Ambrose Ho 2012–2017: former Chairman of the Broadcasting Authority 2008-2012
- Mr Huen Wong, BBS, JP 2017-?
- Ms Winnie TAM Wan-chi, SC ?-present

== Comparisons ==
Similar bodies around the world are:

- Australia: Australian Communications and Media Authority
- Canada: Canadian Radio-television and Telecommunications Commission (CRTC)
- France: Regulatory Authority for Audiovisual and Digital Communication (formerly Superior Audiovisual Council and earlier ORTF)
- United Kingdom: Office of Communications (Ofcom)
- United States: Federal Communications Commission (FCC)
- Italy: AGCOM
