= Television and Entertainment Licensing Authority =

- 影視及娛樂事務管理處

Agency overview
- Headquarters: 39/F, Revenue Tower, 5 Gloucester Road, Wan Chai, Hong Kong
- Employees: 155 (March 2008)
- Annual budget: HK$ 147.8m (2008-09)
- Agency executive: Ms Maisie Cheng, Commissioner for Television and Entertainment Licensing
- Website: Office of Communications Authority

Television and Entertainment Licensing Authority
- Traditional Chinese: 影視及娛樂事務管理處
Transcriptions
Yue: Cantonese
- Yale Romanization: Yíng sih kahp yùh lohk sih mouh gún léih chyu
- Jyutping: Jing2 si6 kap6 ju4 lok6 si6 mou6 gun2 lei5 cyu3

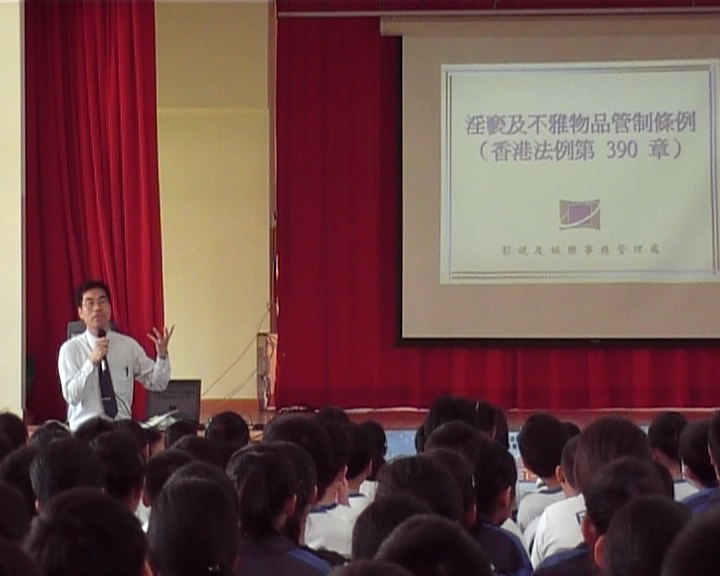
Staff of TELA informing in a HK school

Television and Entertainment Licensing Authority (TELA) was an entertainment regulatory agency in Hong Kong under the Government of Hong Kong.

On 1 April 2012, TELA merged with Hong Kong Broadcasting Authority and Office of the Telecommunications Authority to create a new authority, the Communications Authority.

== Previous Commissioners ==
- Cheung Po Duk 張寶德 (1995—1996)
- Chan Juk-duk 陳育德 (1996—2002)
- Wong Long-si 黃浪詩 (2002—2007)
- Maisie Cheng 鄭美施 (2007—2009)
- Lau Ming-gwong 劉明光 (2010-2012)

== See also ==
- Hong Kong Broadcasting Authority
- Office of the Telecommunications Authority
