= Trade and Industry Department =

Hong Kong government department

- 工業貿易署
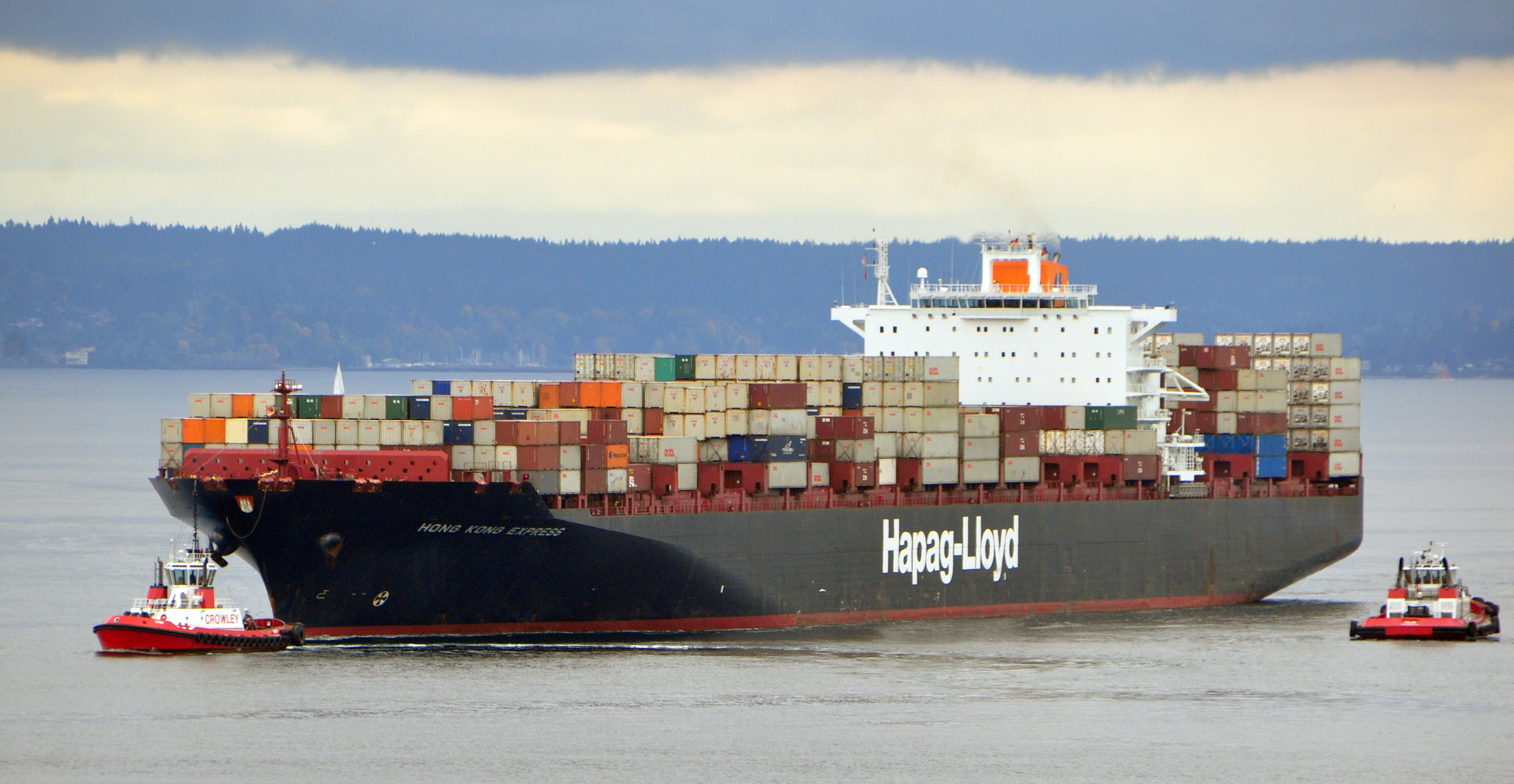

Agency overview
- Headquarters: Trade and Industry Tower; 3 Concorde Road, San Po Kong
- Employees: ~600
- Annual budget: HK$802.4 million (2017-18 estimate)
- Agency executive: Brian Lo, Director-General of Trade and Industry
- Parent agency: Commerce and Economic Development Bureau
- Website: tid.gov.hk

The Trade and Industry Department of the Hong Kong Government is responsible for supporting traders and small businesses in the global market.

== History ==
The Imports and Exports Department was renamed the Commerce and Industry Department in 1949. It was subsequently reorganised and renamed the Trade, Industry and Customs Department and later the Trade Department. It remerged with part of the Industry Department in respect of general support for the industry sector and small and medium enterprises, and renamed Trade and Industry Department in 2000. The remainder of the disestablished Industry Department was reorganised into the Innovation and Technology Commission.

== Responsibilities ==
The Department promotes trade through intra- and international agreements, such as the Closer Economic Partnership Arrangement with Mainland China. It provides resources to local businesses looking to expand overseas.

To fulfil its duties, the Department estimated expenditure of HK$802,446,000 in the 2017–18 financial year.

== Organisation ==
The Department is run by a Director-General, who oversees two deputies, one for Multilateral Trade, Regional Cooperation & Bilateral Trade and one for Bilateral Trade, Controls & Industries Support. The Department is then split into divisions, each run by an Assistant Director-General:

- Multilateral Trade
- Regional Cooperation
- Europe
- Americas
- Mainland
- Systems
- Industries Support

There is also an Administration Branch and an Information and Public Relations Section.

The Department additionally comprises:

- Trade and Industry Advisory Board
- Textiles Advisory Board
- Small and Medium Enterprises Committee
- Customer Liaison Groups
- Committee for Pacific Economic Cooperation
- Review Body on Bid Challenges

Its headquarters are the Trade and Industry Tower in San Po Kong.
