= Partygate (Hong Kong) =

Hong Kong Covid-19 party scandal

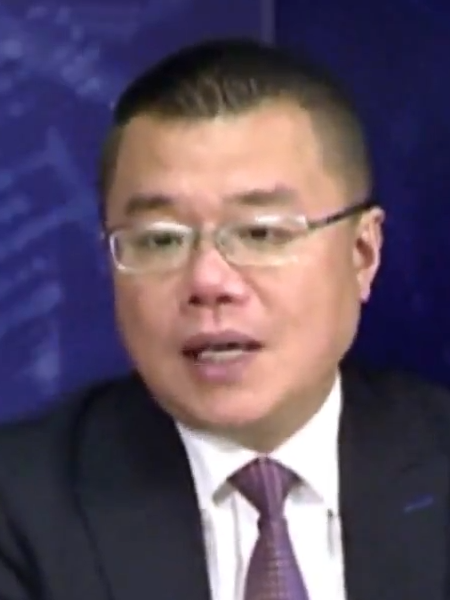
Witman Hung, whose birthday party stirred controversy

Partygate refers to a political scandal in Hong Kong that occurred during the COVID-19 pandemic.

On 3 January 2022, during the city's fifth wave of COVID-19 infections, a banquet was held at a tapas bar in Wan Chai to celebrate the 53rd birthday of Witman Hung Wai-man, a delegate of Hong Kong to the National People's Congress. Amidst initial spread of the Omicron variant, the party was attended by at least 225 people, including several senior officials, exceeding the legal capacity of the venue. The party was held against advice given by authorities to avoid large gatherings, and some attendees were later scrutinised for failing to use the government's contact tracing app, LeaveHomeSafe, as was legally required.

The party became known to the public after a participant became infected with COVID-19, prompting authorities to order Hung and 170 other attendees to enter quarantine at a government facility in Penny's Bay. The event became a political scandal over possible violation of anti-epidemic regulations. Chief Executive Carrie Lam suspended 13 officials who had attended, including Secretary for Home Affairs Caspar Tsui, who later resigned from his post.

== Background ==
During the COVID-19 pandemic, Hong Kong authorities maintained strict public health measures and implemented a zero-COVID policy. The first clusters of the highly contagious Omicron variant of concern appeared in the city on 30 December. In response, authorities advised citizens to avoid crowds or attending large gatherings.

Witman Hung Wai-man is the principal liaison officer for Hong Kong at the Shenzhen Qianhai Authority and a delegate of Hong Kong to the National People's Congress. Described by the South China Morning Post as a "flamboyant personality", Hung is considered well-connected among Hong Kong political and business leaders. An anonymous source familiar with Hung also described him as a "party animal".

The 7th Legislative Council of Hong Kong had just been formed after the 2021 legislative election and was due to convene its first session on 12 January 2022, just days before the scandal broke and implicated several newly elected members.

== Witman Hung's birthday party ==
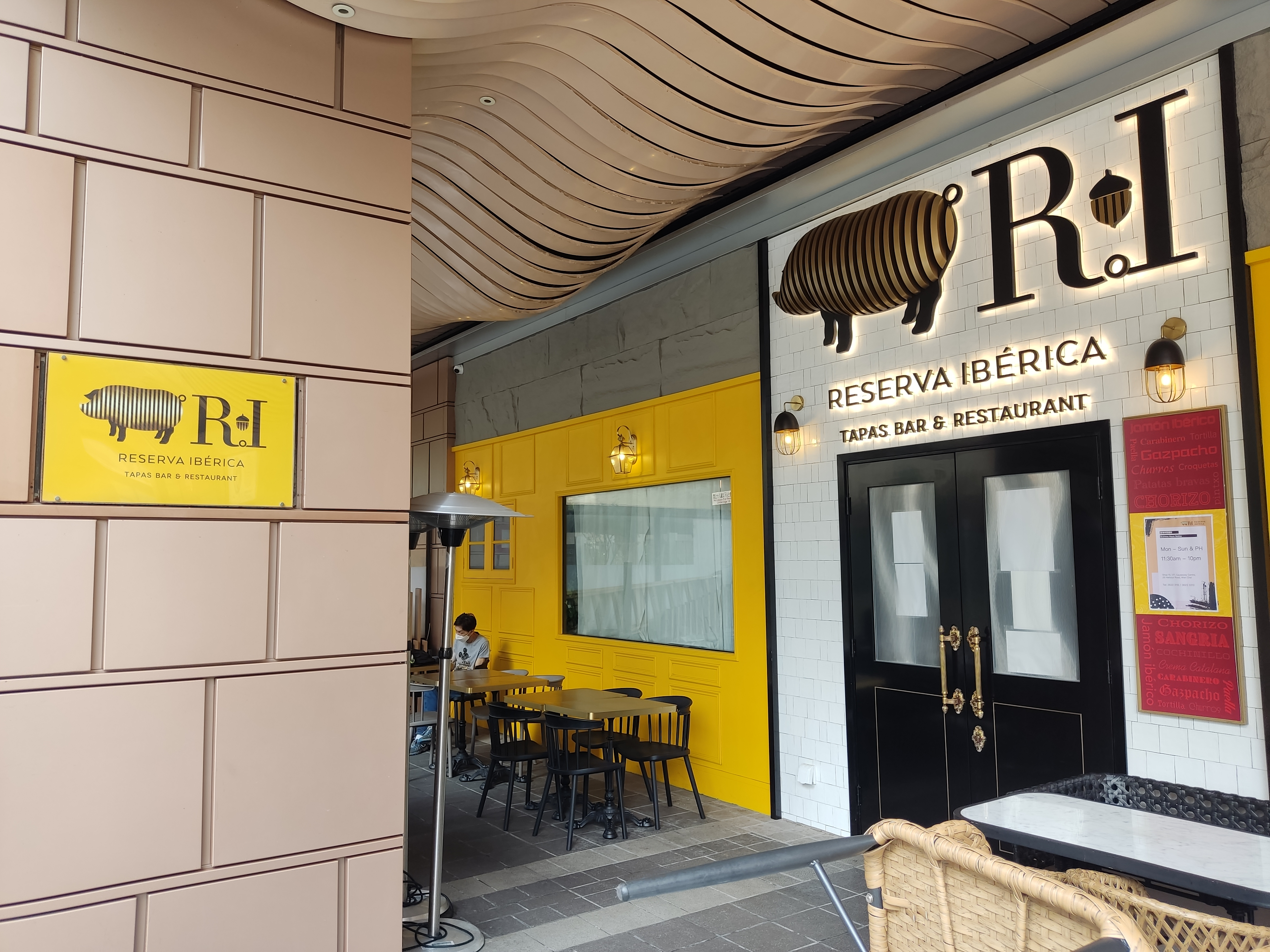
Hung's party was held at Reserva Ibérica Tapas Bar & Restaurant in Wan Chai.

On 3 January 2022, a banquet was held to celebrate the 53rd birthday of Witman Hung Wai-man at Reserva Ibérica Tapas Bar & Restaurant in Causeway Centre, Wan Chai. With an indoor dining area of about 1,000 sq ft (93 m^{2}), this Spanish restaurant was estimated to be serving 150 customers under the "type D" mode of operation. The number of diners in type D catering businesses could not exceed the seating capacity of the premise and it was the restaurant's responsibility under the law to ensure that all customers had scanned the QR code for the government's track-and-trace mobile application before entering the venue.

However, photographs leaked to the press showed more than 200 joined the crowded party, with some believed to be senior government officials and members of the Legislative Council, who had attended their oath-taking ceremony earlier that day. Later reports confirmed the event was attended by at least 225 people, including fourteen senior officials and twenty lawmakers, exceeding the legal capacity of the venue. Hung was photographed not wearing a face mask while singing karaoke and interacting closely with guests. Reports suggested that some officials, including Secretary for Home Affairs Caspar Tsui, stayed throughout the banquet, while some others attended for brief periods before leaving. Many attendees also failed to use Hong Kong's contact tracing app, LeaveHomeSafe, as was mandated under government guidelines.

== Consequences ==
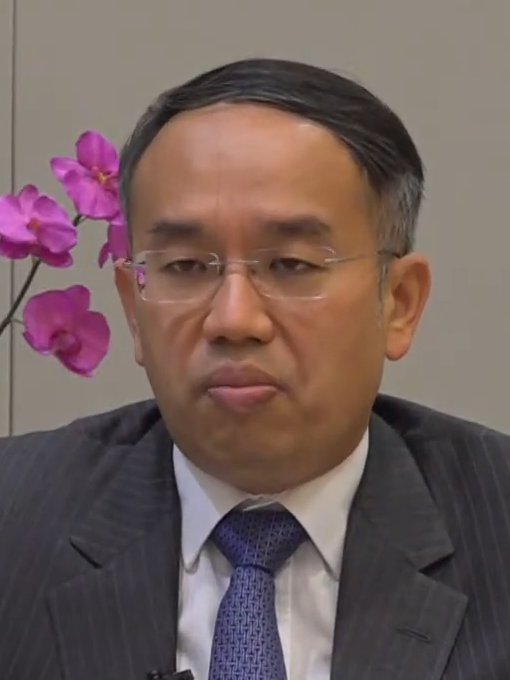
Finance Secretary Christopher Hui

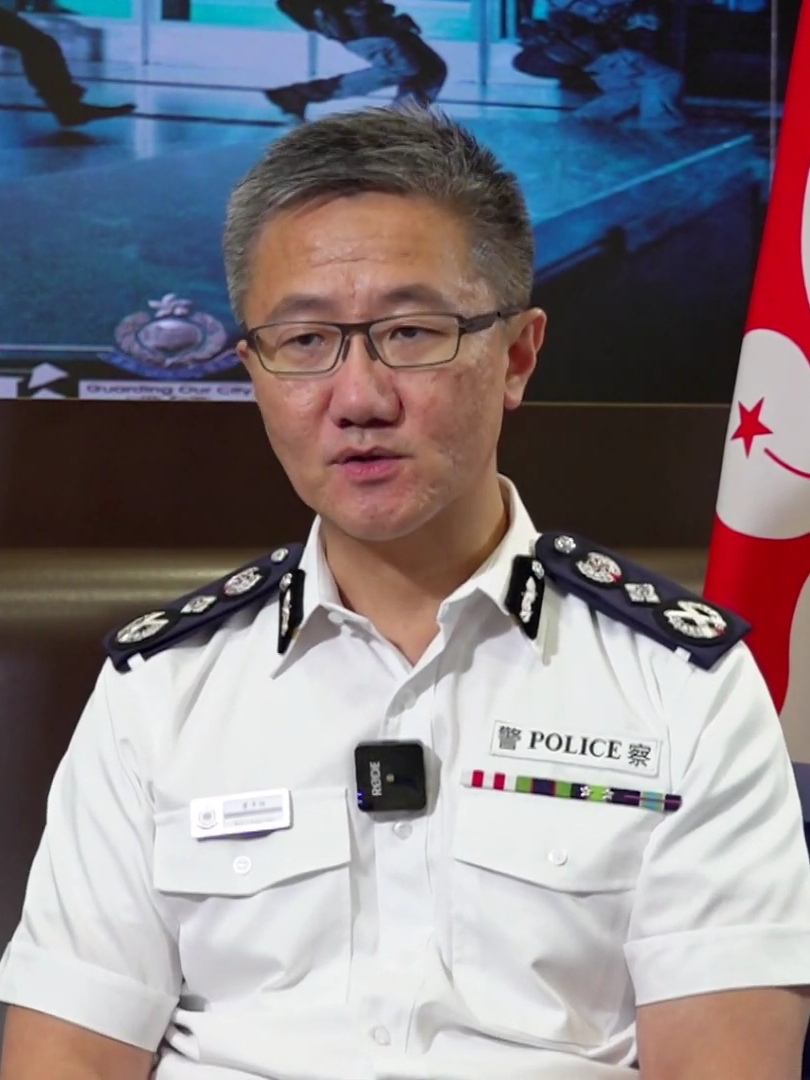
Commissioner of Police Raymond Siu

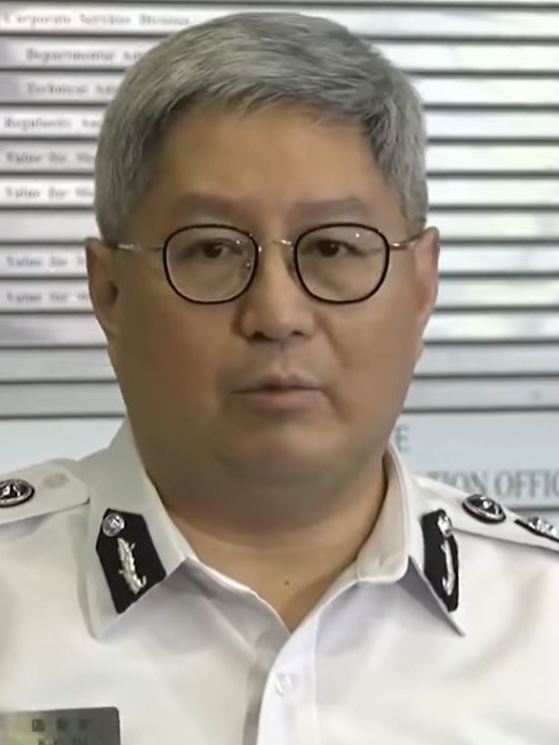
Director of Immigration Au Ka-wang

Hui, Siu and Au were among the senior officials ordered to enter quarantine facilities following their attendance of Hung's birthday party.

On 6 January, a participant of the party, who had been in close contact with some legislators, tested positive for COVID-19. Later that day, Chief Executive Carrie Lam confirmed more than ten senior government officials joined the party. She said she was "very disappointed" in ministers joining the party, especially Tsui, and vowed to take action.

On 7 January, the Food and Environmental Hygiene Department launched an investigation into social distancing adherence at the restaurant during the event, whilst Lam announced the Director of the Chief Executive's Office Eric Chan Kwok-ki and the Secretary for the Civil Service Patrick Nip Tak-kuen would be tasked with parallel investigations into the actions of attending legislators.

In accordance with Hong Kong's COVID-19 contact tracing system, 170 attendees including 20 legislators and more than 10 government officials were ordered to enter a 21-day quarantine at a government facility in Penny's Bay. Lam suspended 13 officials for the duration of their quarantine. A second attendee later tested positive for the virus though this was later found to be a false positive, leading to 11 officials being permitted to leave the quarantine facility; Lam instead ordered them to self-isolate at home using their own annual leave.

On 18 January, three officials, including Tsui, left the quarantine facility early as the 21-day isolation period had been reduced to 14 days.

== Notable attendees ==
Category	Attendee	Position	Quarantined	Self-isolated at home	Scanned mandatory track-and-trace app
Principal officials	Caspar Tsui	Secretary for Home Affairs	For 21 days		No
Principal officials	Christopher Hui	Secretary for Financial Services and the Treasury	Until false positive reported	Requested by CE	
Principal officials	Simon Peh	Commissioner of the Independent Commission Against Corruption	Until false positive reported	Requested by CE	
Principal officials	Raymond Siu	Commissioner of Police	Until false positive reported	Requested by CE	
Principal officials	Au Ka-wang	Director of Immigration	For 21 days		No
Political appointees	Jack Chan Jick-chi	Under Secretary for Home Affairs	Until false positive reported	Requested by CE	Yes
Political appointees	Joseph Chan Ho-lim	Under Secretary for Financial Services and the Treasury	Until false positive reported	Requested by CE	
Political appointees	David Chung Wai-keung	Under Secretary for Innovation and Technology	Until false positive reported	Requested by CE	
Political appointees	Clement Woo Kin-man	Under Secretary for Constitutional and Mainland Affairs	Until false positive reported	Requested by CE	
Political appointees	Jack Chan Jick-chi	Under Secretary for Home Affairs	Until false positive reported	Requested by CE	Yes
Political appointees	Joseph Chan Ho-lim	Under Secretary for Financial Services and the Treasury	Until false positive reported	Requested by CE	
Political appointees	David Chung Wai-keung	Under Secretary for Innovation and Technology	Until false positive reported	Requested by CE	
Other officials	Vincent Fung Hao-yin	Deputy Head of the Policy Innovation and Co-ordination Office	Until false positive reported	Requested by CE	Yes
Other officials	Burmie Wong Wing-kwan	Media Officer at the Home Affairs Bureau			
Members of the 7th Legislative Council	Rock Chen		For 21 days		
Members of the 7th Legislative Council	Duncan Chiu		For 21 days		
Members of the 7th Legislative Council	Benson Luk		For 21 days		
Members of the 7th Legislative Council	Wendy Hong		For 21 days		
Members of the 7th Legislative Council	Tan Yueheng		Until false positive reported	Urged by LegCo Pres.	
Members of the 7th Legislative Council	Lai Tung-kwok		Until false positive reported	Urged by LegCo Pres.	
Members of the 7th Legislative Council	Junius Ho		Until false positive reported	Urged by LegCo Pres.	
Members of the 7th Legislative Council	Kenneth Fok		Until false positive reported	Urged by LegCo Pres.	
Members of the 7th Legislative Council	Nixie Lam		Until false positive reported	Urged by LegCo Pres.	
Members of the 7th Legislative Council	Judy Chan			Urged by LegCo Pres.	Yes
Members of the 7th Legislative Council	Lillian Kwok			Urged by LegCo Pres.	
Members of the 7th Legislative Council	Chan Pui-leung			Urged by LegCo Pres.	
Members of the 7th Legislative Council	Elizabeth Quat			Urged by LegCo Pres.	
Members of the 7th Legislative Council	Eunice Yung			Urged by LegCo Pres.	
Members of the 7th Legislative Council	Chow Man-kong			Urged by LegCo Pres.	
Members of the 7th Legislative Council	Kwok Wai-keung			Urged by LegCo Pres.	
Members of the 7th Legislative Council	Dennis Lam			Urged by LegCo Pres.	
Members of the 7th Legislative Council	Kenneth Leung Yuk-wai			Urged by LegCo Pres.	
Members of the 7th Legislative Council	Johnny Ng			Urged by LegCo Pres.	
Members of the 7th Legislative Council	Nelson Lam			Urged by LegCo Pres.	
Other attendees	Chan Chak-ming	President of the Law Society of Hong Kong			
Other attendees	Cally Kwong	Delegate of Hong Kong to the National People's Congress			No
Other attendees	Ellen Tsang Fung-chu	Member of the Election Committee			
Other attendees	Hermes Tang	Former Commissioner of Customs and Excise			
Other attendees	Yang Wang	Vice-president of HKUST			
Other attendees	Charles Ng Wang-wai	Vice-president of HKUST (Guangzhou), 2021 legislative election candidate (Election Committee constituency)			
Other attendees	Wu Chili	Research centre manager of HKUST Fok Ying Tung Research Institute, 2021 legislative election candidate (Technology and Innovation constituency)			

== Reactions ==
Just days before the party, Carrie Lam condemned Cathay Pacific leaders after its staff were blamed for starting the fifth wave of pandemic and asked them to take the responsibility, citing herself as an example, "I need to be responsible for everything as the head of the Special Administrative Region". However, after ministers were involved in the partygate, Lam said she doesn't need to bear responsibility for ministers' own mistakes. This perceived double standard attracted criticism in local media. Pro-Beijing politicians Tam Yiu-chung and Kwok Wai-keung continued to criticise Cathay Pacific when asked about the event.

In response to the backlash from politicians, local media, and attendees to his party who were being moved into quarantine, Hung apologised for his actions from the quarantine centre in Penny's Bay. When asked if he would resign, he told South China Morning Post, "I am too busy and don't have time to think about whether I should resign from the Qianhai Authority". Tam Yiu-chung, Hong Kong's delegate to the Standing Committee of the National People's Congress, said that "Hung has said sorry for triggering the saga. I don't see any need for him to resign as a deputy to the NPC".

Senior officials, especially Commissioner of ICAC Simon Peh, were also criticised for attending private parties, which were usually avoided to show neutrality in the colonial era and the early years after the handover of Hong Kong. Chung Kim-wah, vice-president of Hong Kong Public Opinion Research Institute, said the Witman Hung partygate and the Evergrande dinner scandal (in which three officials joined a dinner violating pandemic regulations, with one of the attendees arrested for rape) showed that the boundary between the political cultures in Hong Kong and China was further blurred.

On 11 January, Raymond Young, former Permanent Secretary for Home Affairs who was said to be dissatisfied with Carrie Lam when the two worked together, questioned which rules officials broke, considering that the party was held two days before rules were tightened. He also revealed that Lam attended a wedding recently. Lam replied she attended the wedding party for around 10 minutes and it was in late-November or early-December 2021. Hong Kong Inmedia later reported the party was on 5 December 2021 and Lam had worn a mask during it.

Authorities in Beijing reportedly pressured Lam to take action against the officials implicated. The scandal also attracted international media attention.

== Aftermath ==
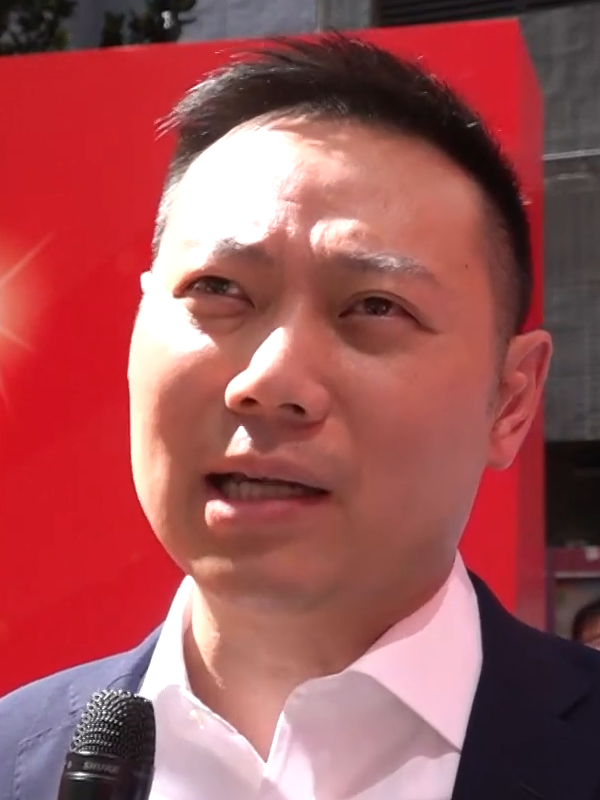
Caspar Tsui resigned from his post as Secretary for Home Affairs in the fallout from the scandal.

Reportedly facing the sack, Tsui resigned on 31 January, awaiting approval from the Chinese government. At a press conference a few hours later, Lam criticised all officials who attended but singled out Tsui given his role in overseeing Hong Kong's pandemic response. The investigation report concluded Tsui had breached COVID rules for not scanning the LeaveHomeSafe tracing app and not wearing a mask during conversations at the party. Two other officials, Vincent Fung and Allen Fung, were verbally warned, while the remaining 12 were not punished.

On 22 April 2022, a representative of the restaurant operator pleaded guilty at the Eastern Magistrates' Courts to violating COVID-19 restrictions, for which the operator received a fine of 6,000 Hong Kong dollars.

In September 2022, one of the guests, Celia Wong Sze-nga, was charged with submitting false information to health officers. She claimed dementia as part of her defence, and was found guilty in January 2024 of misleading health officials.

In November 2022, Tsui said that he contacted Hung, saying that Hung was "also a victim in some way".

== See also ==
- Partygate, a similar political scandal in the United Kingdom
- Oireachtas Golf Society scandal, a similar political scandal in Ireland
- COVID-19 pandemic in Hong Kong
- Political impact of the COVID-19 pandemic
