= Hong Kong bottled water scandal =

2025 procurement scandal

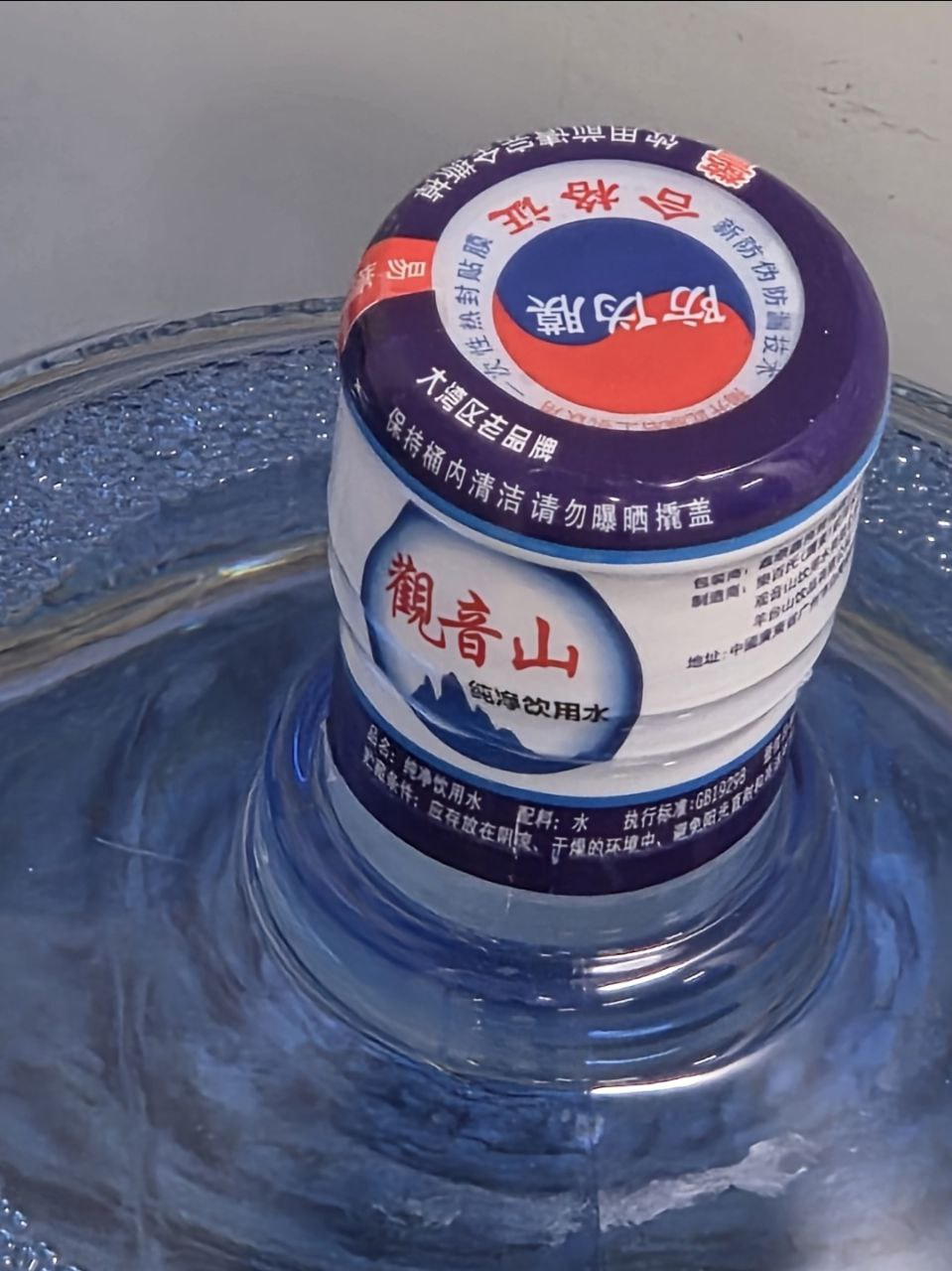
- Water bottle of Xin Le Guan Yin Shan
- Date: August 2025
- Location: Hong Kong
- Type: Procurement oversight
- Arrests: 2
- Charges: Fraud

The Hong Kong bottled water scandal is a procurement scandal of the Hong Kong government, after a couple was found to have misled the government into entering a fraudulent contract to supply bottled water from mainland China to government offices in 2025. It eroded public confidence in the integrity of the government's procurement procedures, leading to the first public apology from an official in six years.

== Background ==
The Government Logistics Department (GLD) conducted an open tender in March 2025 to select suppliers of bottled drinking water for government departments after the expiry of the original contracts. Three months later, the GLD awarded a three-year contract to Xin Ding Xin Trade Co. Limited (鑫鼎鑫商貿有限公司; hereafter "XDX") for supplying "Xin Le Guan Yin Shan" (鑫樂觀音山) water, manufactured by Robust (Guangdong) Drinking Water's Guangzhou branch (乐百氏(广东)饮用水有限公司), to offices on Hong Kong Island and outlying islands starting from late June. "Happy" water made by Dongguan Dongwa Drinking Water Co. Limited was selected to supply offices in New Territories and Lantau Island, while "COOL" water, by tycoon Li Ka-shing's local retailer AS Watson, would be provided in Kowloon offices. The contract took effect on 23 June, and was publicly announced in late July. The government claimed that the new contracts would save taxpayers HK$16 million a year.

It was the first time that government contracts for the provision of drinking water were awarded to non-local brands, immediately drawing attention and concerns from the public. Out of the two successful mainland Chinese water bids, Robust was named by Chinese national and provincial authorities in 2017 for health issues, including a breach of the microbiological limit and discovery of bromate in the sample. Many civil servants across Hong Kong chose to buy bottled water locally to avoid drinking the government-provided water as a result.

Amidst growing safety concerns, Chief Executive John Lee confirmed that the bottled water complied with international standards and expressed his confidence in the tendering system, which he said was "effectively and stringently enforced" and requires independent certification for water quality. Lee said authorities would conduct random inspections as the government attached much importance to safety, and the contract would be immediately terminated if standards were not met.

== Contract terminated ==
Since the award of tender XDX repeatedly failed to comply with the contract, including producing non-compliant carboy labels. Multiple departments also complained delayed delivery by XDX and other poor performances, while XDX failed to pay the contract deposit by the deadline.

In early August, XDX requested to change the water from "Xin Le" by Robust to "Happy" by Dongwa, claiming to be as a result of heavy rain. The GLD approved the change on 11 August while pending verification for the validity of the test reports.^{:13} On the same day, Robust wrote to the GLD denying they had provided water to the government, nor had they authorised any party to do so. Robust also confirmed that Xin Ding Xin was not affiliated with them and the two sides have no business dealings.^{:5} Hong Kong Standards and Testing Centre, from which XDX's test report claimed to be, confirmed to the government on 12 August that they did not issue such reports.^{:14} After GLD's meetings with XDX and Robust,^{:5} the government announced on 16 August through a press release that they had "partially terminated" the HK$52.9 million contract with Xin Ding Xin after "having received information on XDX's business operation recently" and was "not satisfied that XDX would still be capable of performing the contract". The government also arranged for AS Watson to supply bottled drinking water temporarily.

XDX and XDX-linked terminated contracts
Government departments	Supply / Services	Value (HK$)
Government Logistics Dept.	Drinking water	52.9 million
Government Logistics Dept.	Bleach	0.7 million
Government Logistics Dept.	Bleach	1 million
Government Logistics Dept.	Bleach	0.2 million
Drainage Services Dept.	Chemicals	6 million
Fire Services Dept.	Data entry	5 million

The government eventually terminated six contracts on 20 August following an order from the Financial Services and the Treasury Bureau, including the bottled water and two contracts with the Drainage Services Department and the Fire Services Department. The authorities had only paid HK$2,268 to XDX under a 30-day payment period in the tender terms, and is entitled to deduct the deposit of around HK$1 million under the water supply contract to recover its losses. Officials added they will consider recovering losses for other contracts.

== Reaction ==
The scandal immediately caused widespread concerns, seriously hampered the public confidence and integrity of government's procurement procedures, raising questions on government's ability to vet bidders.

A day after the contract was halted, the treasury minister Christopher Hui set up a task force to review the government’s procurement regime. The Financial Services and Treasury Bureau led by Hui also invited the Audit Commission to review the tender procedure and identify any negligence or deficiencies. Hui acknowledged the "inadequacies" by the government in the "problematic" purchase and pledged to study ways to improve the procedures after the review. Interim investigation results would be issued in three months and focused on potential "red flags" such as due diligence, contract management, and quality control.

The Government Logistics Department was "tasked with taking up the main responsibility". After days of remaining silent and refusing to comment on the matter, Carlson Chan Ka-shun, Director of the GLD who was expected to retire soon, apologised to the public on behalf of the department on 21 August, five days after the scandal unraveled. He admitted that the department had failed to detect the fraudulent and improper elements such as forged documents when examining the returned tender. It was the first time since 2019 anti-extradition bill protests that a government official made a public apology.

I understand that this incident, this hoax, has raised huge public concerns over government procurement and caused concern for our colleagues in the government about the water supply. In this respect, we feel that there were indeed inadequacies in our procedures and I would like to apologise to everyone on behalf of the Government Logistics Department.

— Carlson Chan

I am extremely concerned about the Logistics Department’s failure to do its job. While the successful bidder provided false information, I am deeply disappointed that this happened in a professional department that handles procurement every day.

— John Lee, Chief Executive

John Lee also blamed the GLD for the oversight and said he was "deeply disappointed". Lee said this blunder reflected the necessity of government staff to improve cautiousness, and pledged to identify shortcomings and loopholes in the procurement regime as soon as possible. However, no officials directly commented on whether any official had to take responsibility.

The incident further strengthened distrust of mainland Chinese food and drinks in Hong Kong society. Christopher Hui insisted that both mainland Chinese and Hong Kong brands met the standards without difference in quality.

The government announced in November that Carlson Chan, who has then retired from the civil service, would not appear in the presentation ceremony to receive his Silver Bauhinia Star pending the conclusion of the disciplinary probe.

== Investigation ==
Xin Ding Xin's office was apparently without any business operations and was suspected of being a shell company, with only three full-time employees and no previous records in supplying drinking water to the government.^{:7} Upon media enquiry, the two other manufacturers listed on the Xin Le labels – Dongguan Guanyinshan Drinking Water Co. Ltd. and Yangtaishan Beverage Co. Ltd. – denied selling water to Hong Kong. According to Chinese commercial inquiry platform Tianyancha, Guanyinshan and Yangtaishan Beverage share the same shareholders. Yangtaishan Beverage had been under inspection by Guangdong authorities for failing food safety tests, with contamination by pseudomonas aeruginosa, in 2023.

The police confirmed that the water was produced in a third-party factory in Zhangmutou, in Dongguan of Guangdong, commissioned by XDX's director Lui Tsz-chung and his wife. Despite the earlier denial, the water bottles at the supplying factory carried the name of "Guanyinshan".

YTAD International Logistics, a logistics company in Yuen Long responsible for delivering XDX's water to government offices, accused XDX for failing to pay them. Both sides did not sign a contract.

The Audit Commission's investigation found that XDX sealed documents submitted to the authorities with a chop containing the wrong name for Robust (showing "百氏" instead of "樂百氏"). XDX resubmitted the documents after the officials sought clarification from them and the authorities did not raise further queries. The Audit Commission concluded this lack of awareness as an obvious singal of fraud.^{:6}

=== Arrest of XDX director ===
The police launched a criminal investigation at GLD's referral. XDX director Lui Tsz-chung and his wife, shareholder Chan Pik-lam, were arrested on 17 August for defrauding the government to secure the deal. Lui was charged with one count of fraud while Chan was released on bail. They were later arrested again by customs authorities for breaching the Trade Descriptions Ordinance for providing false manufacturing information. Police are also pursuing a mainland Chinese man on suspicions of his connection to the matter.

Multiple fraudulent cases related to Lui were uncovered by the media after their arrest. Sino Ocean Entreprises Limited, of which Lui was a director, was liquidated in 2015 before re-establishing a year later. His assets were frozen by a Chinese court in the same year after neglecting court cases over his breach of contract until 2018. Four years later, one of his companies in Dongguan was blacklisted for failing to pay wages. A preliminary probe by the Hong Kong police found the couple was linked to a separate fraud case by using false documents to obtain trade loans. In 2024, Sojitz, a Japanese corporation, sued Lui, his wife, and a suspected relative of Lui in Hong Kong, accusing them of defrauding over 2 billion yen in a purchase of caustic soda between 2022 and 2023. Nonetheless, Sino Ocean Entreprises Limited owned by Lui was awarded a contract by the Leisure and Cultural Services Department in 2023 to supply sodium hypochlorite solutions.

=== Assessment criterion of tender ===
The government's term of this tender came into scrutiny. While XDX was the lowest bidder among the contenders, Hui earlier insisted that price was not the sole deciding factor in awarding the contracts. Chan told reporters that "lowest bidder wins" principle was adhered to in this round as it did for its last contract with a different company, but other factors including supplier's licenses and independent water quality reports and certifications are also considered. However, tender documents attained by the media listed price as the sole criterion, contrary to last tender in 2023 which took firms' governance, supply chain stability and other factors into consideration under a "marking scheme". According to Audit's probe, Carlson Chan endorsed the decision to drop the marking scheme in February 2025 under the established mechanism in favour of a simple and straightforward procurement process.^{:10}

== Aftermath ==
The government completed the disciplinary investigation in January 2026 which concluded that three department staffers had allegedly performed below standards with a lack of vigilance. Two of them would face disciplinary hearings and deferred salary increments, including a directorate grade employee who is believed to have retired. Carlson Chan, although not found to have been negligent, was identified for his lack of ability to improve the quality of his colleagues' work. The government decided to reverse the decision to award the Silver Bauhinia Star to Chan. An auditing mechanism was introduced to scrutinise deals above HK$15 million in value, as a result of the investigation, so that contracts could be halted as soon as possible for the sake of "public interest".
