= Hong Kong–Qatar relations =

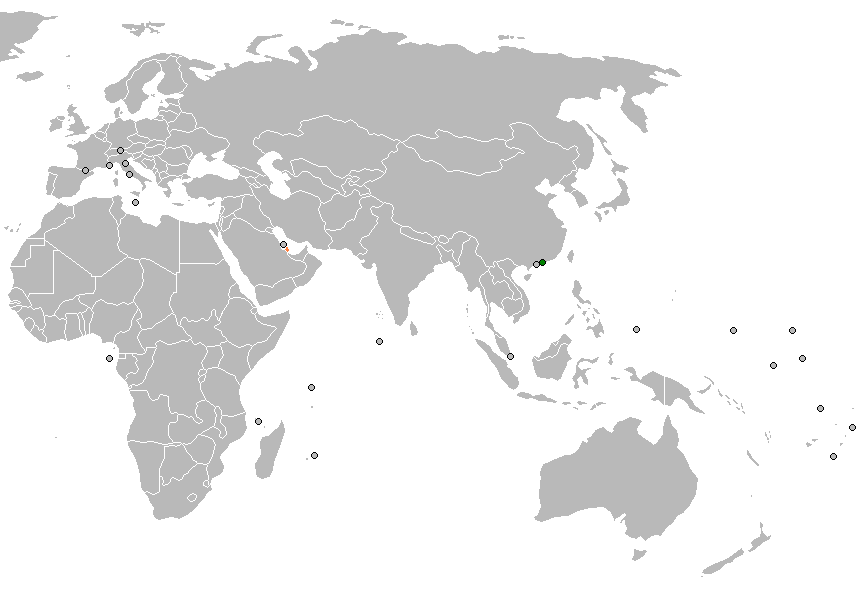

- Hong Kong: Qatar

Hong Kong–Qatar relations refers to bilateral foreign relations between Hong Kong and Qatar. While both Qatar and Hong Kong are geographically small and in separate regions of the Asian continent, the connections between the two have a long history.

Historically, foreign trade between the two could possibly be traced back to the pre-modern period, as characteristics of archaeological finds discovered from both areas could have possibly indicated.

Qatar has a Consulate General in Wan Chai, Hong Kong Island in Hong Kong.

Qatar is Hong Kong's important trade partner in the Middle East since the 20th century. Hong Kong's total exports to Qatar is US$30 million in January–March 2016. Major export items included telecom equipment and parts (US$10 million), jewellery (US$6 million) and travel goods & handbags (US$3 million). Hong Kong's imports from Qatar is US$25 million in the first three months of 2016, petroleum oils (other than crude)(US$19 million, 74.3% of total) and polymers of ethylene in primary forms (US$2 million, 7% of total) are the primary imports.

To bolster the economic and trade connections between the two places, and offer added incentives for companies in Qatar to do business or invest in both places, as suggested by KC Chan, the then Hong Kong Secretary for Financial Services and the Treasury who led the negotiation, Hong Kong and Qatar agreed on The Treaty for the Avoidance of Double Taxation and The Prevention of Fiscal Evasion with Respect to Taxes on Income in 2013. Under the agreement, double taxation, especially profits from international shipping transport earned by the other side's residents in another place, is avoided. In addition, the treaty has incorporated an article on exchange of information.

While Qatar and Hong Kong both situated on the One Belt, One Road region, a strengthened bilateral ties between Hong Kong and Qatar were encouraged by the government representatives of both sides in the international meeting in 2015. Hong Kong government has initiated a One Belt, One Road scholarship for students in the One Belt, One Road region, which includes Qatar, to apply for free higher educational opportunities in Hong Kong. The proposal reflected in a strong rejection among Hong Kong public as it was believed by some to be a wastage of Hong Kong's tax revenue to flatter a strategy proposed by the Chinese government. In response to the criticism, the scholarship was later also opened to Hong Kong citizens who have plans to study abroad in the One Belt, One Road region, including Qatar. On top of the disputes, the immigrant policy of Qatar was treated as an indicator for Hong Kong media in reviewing their local policy, which stirred up the discussion in Hong Kong.

Both nations are members of the International Monetary Fund, World Trade Organization. The relations between the two are mainly based on economic, social and cultural aspects.
