= Katherine Ng =

Political Assistant for the Financial Services and the Treasury
- Incumbent
- Assumed office 14 August 2008
- Secretary: Prof. Ka-keung Chan
- Undersecretary: Julia Leung

Personal details
- Born: 1974 (age 51–52) Singapore
- Education: Trinity College, Cambridge; University of Law

Katherine Ng Kit Shuen (伍潔鏇), born in 1974, was the Political Assistant to the Secretary for Financial Services & the Treasury of Hong Kong.

== Early life and education ==
Ng was born in Singapore and moved to Hong Kong at the age of 3. She holds a Bachelor of Arts in Law from the University of Cambridge, a Postgraduate Diploma in Legal Practice from the College of Law in London, and a Master of Arts Degree in Law from the University of Cambridge. She qualified as a solicitor in the UK and Hong Kong in 1998 and 1999 respectively.

== Career ==
Ng worked for Merrill Lynch in Hong Kong from 2005 as the Director of its legal department. She has served at Linklaters' offices in London and Hong Kong, and was a Compliance Officer in Donald Tsang's election campaign for the Chief Executive of HKSAR.

Ng was appointed as a political assistant on 22 May 2008 by Donald Tsang. She is appointed under the expanded political appointment system on non-civil service terms for the term ending 30 June 2012.

== Personal life ==
Ng is a Singaporean citizen and Hong Kong permanent citizen. She said she will not renounce her Singaporean citizenship.
