= Rafael Hui =

Hong Kong politician (1948–2026)

Rafael Hui Si-yan
- 許仕仁
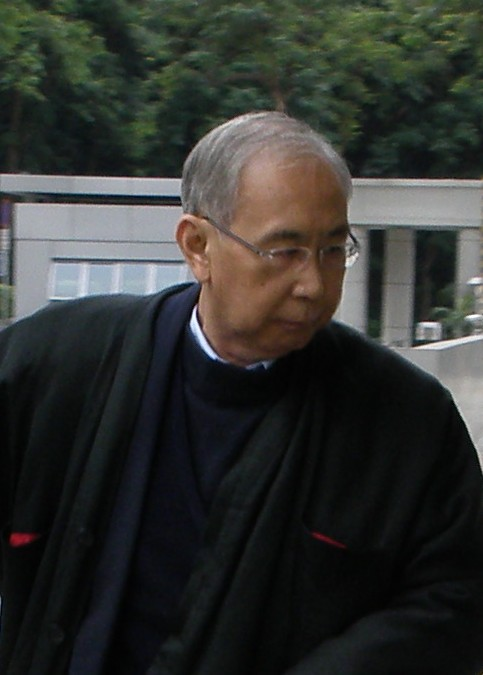

Unofficial Member of the Executive Council
- In office 1 July 2007 – 20 January 2009

Chief Secretary for Administration
- In office 30 June 2005 – 30 June 2007
- Appointed by: Donald Tsang
- Preceded by: Michael Suen (Acting)
- Succeeded by: Henry Tang

Secretary for Financial Services
- In office 4 September 1995 – 31 May 2000
- Appointed by: Chris Patten; Tung Chee-hwa
- Preceded by: Michael David Cartland
- Succeeded by: Stephen Ip

Personal details
- Born: Hui Si-yan; 8 February 1948 Hong Kong
- Died: 1 February 2026 (aged 77) Chai Wan, Hong Kong
- Education: Queen's College, Hong Kong; University of Hong Kong (BA in English); Harvard University (MPA)
- Awards: Justice of the peace (named 2001, revoked 2018); Gold Bauhinia Star (awarded 1998, revoked 2018); Grand Bauhinia Medal (awarded 2007, revoked 2018)
- Criminal information
- Criminal information
- Status: Was incarcerated at the Stanley Prison; Released on 19 December 2019
- Convictions: Misconduct in public office (3 counts); Conspiracy to commit misconduct in public office; Conspiracy to offer an advantage to a public servant
- Penalty: Served nearly 5 years of a 7 ½ year sentence

Rafael Hui
- Traditional Chinese: 許仕仁
- Simplified Chinese: 许仕仁
Transcriptions
Standard Mandarin
- Hanyu Pinyin: Xǔ Shìrén
Yue: Cantonese
- Jyutping: Heoi2 Si6Jan4

Rafael Hui Si-yan (8 February 1948 – 1 February 2026) was a Chief Secretary for Administration of Hong Kong and a career civil servant. Hui has been dubbed "Old Master Hui" (許老爺) and "Fat Dragon" (肥龍). Hui was appointed a Justice of the Peace in 1986 and received the honour of Gold Bauhinia Star in 1998. On 19 December 2014, he was convicted and sentenced to imprisonment for misconduct in public office and bribery, and stripped of his honours and titles in March 2018. He was released in December 2019.

== Early life and education ==
Hui was born in British Hong Kong on 8 February 1948. His father was an indigenous inhabitant from Tai O, Lantau Island.

He attended Queen's College and the University of Hong Kong (BA, 1970).

== Career ==
=== Government service ===
Hui joined the civil service of Hong Kong in 1970 and became an administrative officer (AO). During the early years of his career, he held appointments in numerous branches and departments. He was seconded to the Independent Commission Against Corruption from 1977 to 1979. From 1982 to 1983, he attended an overseas training programme at Harvard University's John F. Kennedy School of Government for his MPA.

Afterwards, he became Deputy Secretary-General in the former Office of the Unofficial Members of the Executive and Legislative Councils (UMELCO) from 1985 to 1986, Deputy Secretary for Economic Services from 1986 to 1990 (under Anson Chan), Deputy Secretary for Works from 1990 to 1991, when he was appointed Director, New Airport Projects Co-ordination Office. He took up the post of Commissioner for Transport from 1992 to 1995.

In 1995, he was appointed to the post of Secretary for Financial Services. In June 2000, he resigned from the civil service and he assumed the post of managing director of the Mandatory Provident Fund Schemes Authority.

In 2002, Hui was elected a steward of the Hong Kong Jockey Club. Hui also served as the vice-chairman of the Hong Kong Arts Festival Society and Chairman of its Programme Committee from 2001. In 2004, he became the Honorary Secretary of the Hong Kong International Film Festival Society Ltd. and a member of the executive committee of the Hong Kong Philharmonic Society Ltd. He resigned all these posts when he assumed office as the Chief Secretary for Administration.

In 2005, Hui was appointed by the State Council of China, on the nomination of Hong Kong Chief Executive Donald Tsang, to the Chief Secretary for Administration. After retiring from the Chief Secretary for Administration, he served on the Executive Council of Hong Kong as an unofficial member from 2007 to 2009.

== Arrest and conviction ==
On 29 March 2012, Hui was arrested by the Independent Commission Against Corruption on suspicion of corruption involving property magnates Thomas and Raymond Kwok of Hong Kong's third richest family, as well as their company Sun Hung Kai Properties.

On 19 December 2014, Hui was convicted of five counts of misconduct in public office after a 128-day jury trial in Hong Kong. He was sentenced to 7.5 years in prison and ordered to return bribes of 11.182 million Hong Kong dollars. Hui was held at Stanley Prison and his appeals to the Court of Appeal and Hong Kong Court of Final Appeal were dismissed.

As a result, his Grand Bauhinia Medal and Gold Bauhinia Star honours were removed, and his Justice of the Peace appointment was revoked by the government in March 2018.

Hui was released early in December 2019, after serving five years of his term, due to good behaviour as an inmate.

== Death ==
Hui died in Chai Wan, Hong Kong on 1 February 2026, at the age of 77.

== In popular culture ==
=== In television ===
- In the 2019 TVB miniseries ICAC Investigators 2022, the character James Kan Tung-yiu, played by Kent Cheng, is based on Hui.

== See also ==
- List of graduates of University of Hong Kong

Political offices
Preceded by Michael David Cartland	Secretary for Financial Services; 1995–2000	Succeeded by Stephen Ip
Preceded by Michael Suen; Acting	Chief Secretary for Administration; 2005–2007	Succeeded by Henry Tang
