= Martin Wheatley =

Hong Kong and UK financier

Martin Wheatley is a British financier, formerly managing director of the Consumer and Markets Business Unit of the Financial Services Authority in the UK, and is the former CEO of the Financial Conduct Authority.

== In London ==
Wheatley worked for the London Stock Exchange for 18 years, including six years on its board. He rose to the position of deputy chief executive, and was closely involved with the failed merger with Deutsche Börse which resulted in the resignation of the LSE's chief executive Gavin Casey. Wheatley was also Chairman of the FTSE International and sat on the Listing Authority Advisory Committee of the UK Financial Services Authority (FSA). In 2003, Wheatley earned a salary of £224,000 and a bonus of £318,000. However, he was made redundant in February 2004; he was expected to receive a severance package of at least £210,000.

== In Hong Kong ==
In June 2004, Wheatley joined Hong Kong's Securities and Futures Commission, the market regulator which oversees the Hong Kong Stock Exchange and the Hong Kong Futures Exchange, as its executive director for market supervision in June 2004. In September 2005, it was announced that he would replace Andrew Sheng as SFC chairman. Sheng had served in that position since 1998. Wheatley became Chief Executive Officer of the SFC on 23 June 2006. Wheatley is a member of the Financial Stability Board Standing Committee on Standards Implementation, as well as the International Organization of Securities Commissions (IOSCO) Technical Committee. Currently, Wheatley chairs the IOSCO Technical Committee Task Force on Short Selling.

Wheatley's tenure at the SFC was marked by aggressive anti-insider trading enforcement. These included the conviction of Du Jun, a former Morgan Stanley banker who was sentenced to seven years in prison. Among other things, the SFC won its first convictions and jail sentences for insider dealing and the first director disqualifications for listed company misconduct. He also made waves with the SFC case against Richard Li's attempt to buy out public shareholders in PCCW and take the company private again, describing the shareholder vote on the issue as marked by "malpractice and manipulation of voting"; the SFC won a case blocking the buyout on appeal.

Wheatley's handling of the Lehman Brothers minibond scandal led to protests by investors who did not receive compensation for their losses. Following Lehman's collapse in September 2008, the SFC secured more than HK$6.5bn (US$835m) in investor compensation from 20 banks and brokers seeking to settle allegations of mis-selling of Lehman-related structured products. Nevertheless, Wheatley was quoted as stating, "I had people marching on the streets with banners with photos of me on them saying go home, death of justice, disgrace. I had noise all day outside my office where they would camp with klaxons and drums. I had a funeral effigy of me burnt outside the office."

Wheatley announced his resignation in December 2010, to be effective in mid-2011, roughly three months before the expiration of his contract. Wheatley's total compensation package in 2010 amounted to HK$9.09 million, including HK$7.2 million in basic salary, HK$1.35 million in discretionary pay, and HK$540,000 in retirement scheme contributions. He stated that he would return to Europe to take up a position with a regulatory agency there.

== Financial Conduct Authority ==
The FSA on 2 February 2011 announced the appointment of Wheatley as the new managing director of its Consumer and Markets Business Unit. The appointment was effective from 1 September 2011, and at that time he joined the FSA Board.

In a separate announcement made by HM Treasury on the same day, Wheatley was also confirmed as the CEO designate of the Consumer Protection and Markets Authority (CPMA), one of the two successor regulatory bodies that were to be formed from the future division of the FSA. On 1 April 2013 the Financial Services Authority was replaced by the CPMA, renamed as the Financial Conduct Authority (FCA), and the Prudential Regulation Authority, working alongside the Financial Policy Committee. The intention was for about 3,000 people from the FSA, including virtually all the support functions, to go to the FCA, which would supervise markets, smaller brokers and advisers and watch how financial institutions of all sizes treat their customers. It was expected to remain in Canary Wharf. It was intended that the FCA would carry on two of the FSA’s biggest projects: the retail distribution review, which focuses on investment products and advice for retail customers, and the mortgage market review.

The appointment of Martin Wheatley to be CEO of the FCA was not approved by the Treasury Select Committee. "The Government did not accept the case for a pre-appointment hearing with the Chief Executive, on the grounds of supposed market sensitivity."

In July 2015, Wheatley resigned his post at the FCA following a "vote of no confidence" by the Chancellor, George Osborne. Tracy McDermott took over from Wheatley at acting FCA chief in September 2015. The next permanent FCA chief executive was Andrew Bailey, who was appointed on 26 January 2016.
