= Sandra Lee =

Sandra Lee may refer to:

- Sandra Lee (chef), American television chef, author and former first lady of New York
- Sandra Lee (dermatologist), a dermatologist who makes online videos as Dr. Pimple Popper
- Sandra Lee-Vercoe (née Lee), New Zealand politician
- Sandra Birch Lee, former Hong Kong politician
- Sandy Lee, lawyer and politician
- Sandra Lee, a character in the graphic novel Superman: Earth One

== See also ==
- Sondra Lee (1930–2026), American actress and dancer
