= Julia Leung =

Hong Kong politician

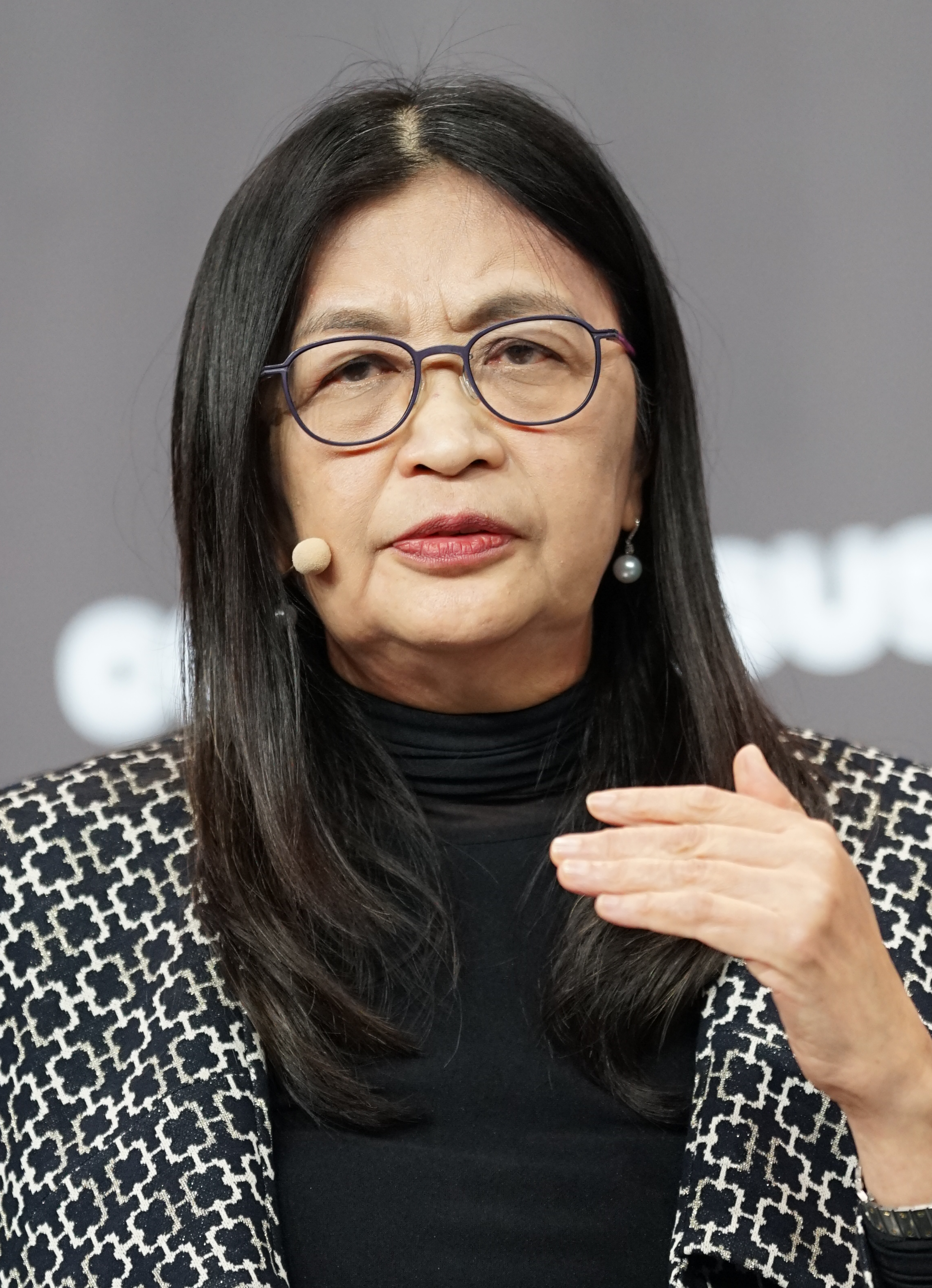
- Leung in 2026

Under Secretary for Financial Services and the Treasury
- Incumbent
- Assumed office 4 August 2008
- Secretary: Professor Ka-Keung Chan
- Political Assistant: Katherine Ng

Personal details
- Born: 1960 (age 65–66) Hong Kong
- Education: BSocSc, CUHK; MSc in Journalism, Columbia University

Julia Leung Fung-yee, SBS (Chinese: 梁鳳儀) is the chief executive officer of the Securities and Futures Commission (SFC) of Hong Kong. She was formerly one of the undersecretaries appointed by the Government of Hong Kong in 2008.

== Education ==
Leung holds a Bachelor of Social Sciences degree from the Chinese University of Hong Kong and a Master of Science degree in journalism from the Columbia University.

== Career ==
Leung joined the Hong Kong Monetary Authority (HKMA) in 1994 and was promoted to executive director (external) in 2000. She is a member of the Financial Services Advisory Committee of the Hong Kong Trade Development Council. Before joining HKMA, she served on the Asian Wall Street Journal for 10 years. She has recently written a book called "The Tides of Capital". This book was published by OMFIF Press in January 2015. In this book Julia Leung distils two decades of financial diplomacy into an incisive account of the lessons Asia and the world have learned from successive bouts of crisis management. She entreats the west to take seriously the full implications of Asia's growing clout on the world economic stage. Leung calls on the US to share its dominant monetary position with others, especially China - a move towards a new monetary system and an overhaul of the governance of world finance.

Leung currently served as executive director, Investment Products upon joining the SFC in Hong Kong, and succeed Mr James Shipton as executive director, Intermediaries Division from 19 June 2016.

== Undersecretary ==
In 2008 she was offered the opportunity to become an undersecretary for the Financial services and the treasury under the Political Appointments System. She possesses British citizenship.

Political offices
New office	Under Secretary for Financial Services and the Treasury; 2008–2013	Succeeded by James Lau
Order of precedence
Preceded by Susie Ho; Permanent Secretary for Commerce and Economic Development (Communications and Technology)	Hong Kong order of precedence Under Secretary for Financial Services and the Treasury	Succeeded by Florence Hui; Under Secretary for Home Affairs
