= Frederick Ma =

Hong Kong politician and administrator

Frederick Ma Si-hang GBS JP
- 馬時亨
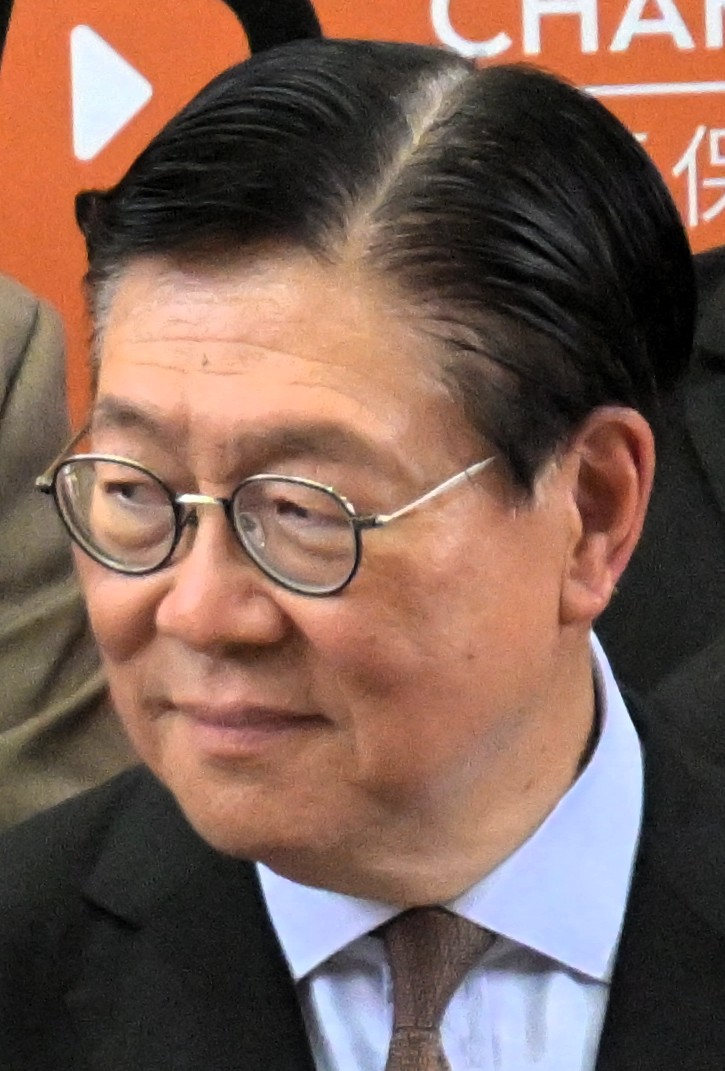
- Ma attending the trophy presentation ceremony of the Queen Elizabeth II Cup at the Sha Tin Racecourse on 27 April 2025

Secretary for Commerce and Economic Development
- In office 1 July 2007 – 11 July 2008
- Chief Executive: Donald Tsang
- Preceded by: Joseph Wong; Stephen Ip
- Succeeded by: Rita Lau

Secretary for Financial Services and the Treasury
- In office 1 July 2002 – 30 June 2007
- Preceded by: Stephen Ip; Denise Yue
- Succeeded by: KC Chan

Personal details
- Born: 22 February 1952 (age 74) British Hong Kong
- Education: University of Hong Kong

Frederick Ma Si-hang
- Traditional Chinese: 馬時亨
- Simplified Chinese: 马时亨
Transcriptions
Standard Mandarin
- Hanyu Pinyin: Mǎ Shíhēng
Yue: Cantonese
- Jyutping: maa5 si4 hang1

Frederick Ma Si-hang GBS JP (Chinese: 馬時亨) is a Hong Kong politician and administrator who was chairman of the MTR Corporation from 2015 to 2019.

As a former Secretary for Commerce and Economic Development of the Hong Kong Special Administrative Region, he was a popular figure with the public and with legislators of all parties. He is the cousin of entertainer Eric Tsang and uncle of evangelist Jaeson Ma.

== Biography ==
Ma was born the eldest of four children on 22 February 1952, and his father died when Ma was in his teens. He attended New Method College in Tai Hang, where his academic results were "less than fantastic". However, whilst there, he won an inter-school project for Hong Kong tourism. He earned a Bachelor of Arts in Economics and History with Third-class Honours at the University of Hong Kong.

He graduated in 1973, dreaming of working for Cathay Pacific. As he was due to attend a second interview with the airline, Chase Manhattan made an offer with a promised starting salary of HK$1,600. He accepted the job with the bank, and was relocated to New York three years later. At 27, he became Group Head of Chase Manhattan, in charge of institutional banking. After Chase, he became Chief Financial Officer of PCCW.

=== Government years ===
Giving up an annual salary of in excess of HK$10 million, Ma joined the government as a 'cabinet-level' political appointee under the Principal Officials Accountability System since 1 July 2002.

Ma declared himself to be a Christian in 2002, and was affectionately known in Hong Kong as "Fat Ma" because of his portly physique.

He served as Secretary for Financial Services and the Treasury for a term of five years. In 2007, after Donald Tsang re-elected as Chief Executive of Hong Kong, Ma continued in SAR government, served as Secretary for Commerce and Economic Development. On 24 June 2008, Ma resigned from the government for health reasons. He was diagnosed with "cavernous hemangioma" and "venous angioma" (blood vessel tumours) in the brain.

=== Subsequent years ===
In October 2008, Ma took up an honorary professorship at the School of Economics and Finance at the University of Hong Kong. During his time out, he took up a regime of exercise and lost 17 pounds, to finally weigh 180 pounds.

In 2009, he was invited to the International Advisory Council of the Chinese sovereign wealth fund China Investment Corporation. He was awarded a Gold Bauhinia Star. It was announced in early November that Ma had been named the new non-executive chairman of China Strategic Holdings SEHK: 235; Raymond Or was named the company's vice-chairman and CEO. The company's shares, which were suspended pending the announcement, closed 78 percent higher when they were relisted.

Ma was appointed Justice of the Peace in 2010.

In July 2015, Ma was named the chairman of the MTR Corporation, a position he held until 2019. He became chairman of the Education University of Hong Kong's governing council on 25 April 2017, by appointment of the Chief Executive. His three-year term expired in 2020.

Political offices
Preceded by Denise Yue as Secretary for the Treasury	Secretary for Financial Services and the Treasury; 2002–2007	Succeeded by KC Chan
Preceded by Stephen Ip as Secretary for Financial Services	Secretary for Financial Services and the Treasury; 2002–2007	Succeeded by KC Chan
Preceded by Joseph Wong as Secretary for Commerce, Industry and Technology	Secretary for Commerce and Economic Development; 2007–2008	Succeeded by Rita Lau
Preceded by Stephen Ip as Secretary for Economic Development and Labour	Secretary for Commerce and Economic Development; 2007–2008	Succeeded by Rita Lau
Business positions
Preceded by Raymond Chien	Chairman of the MTR Corporation Limited; 2016–present	Incumbent
Academic offices
Preceded by Pang Yiu-kai	Chairman of the Education University of Hong Kong; 2017– present	Incumbent
Order of precedence
Preceded by James Wu; Recipients of the Gold Bauhinia Star	Hong Kong order of precedence Recipients of the Gold Bauhinia Star	Succeeded by Tsang Tak-sing; Recipients of the Gold Bauhinia Star
