= Securities and Futures Commission =

Hong Kong statutory body

- 證券及期貨事務監察委員會
- Logo introduced in 2018

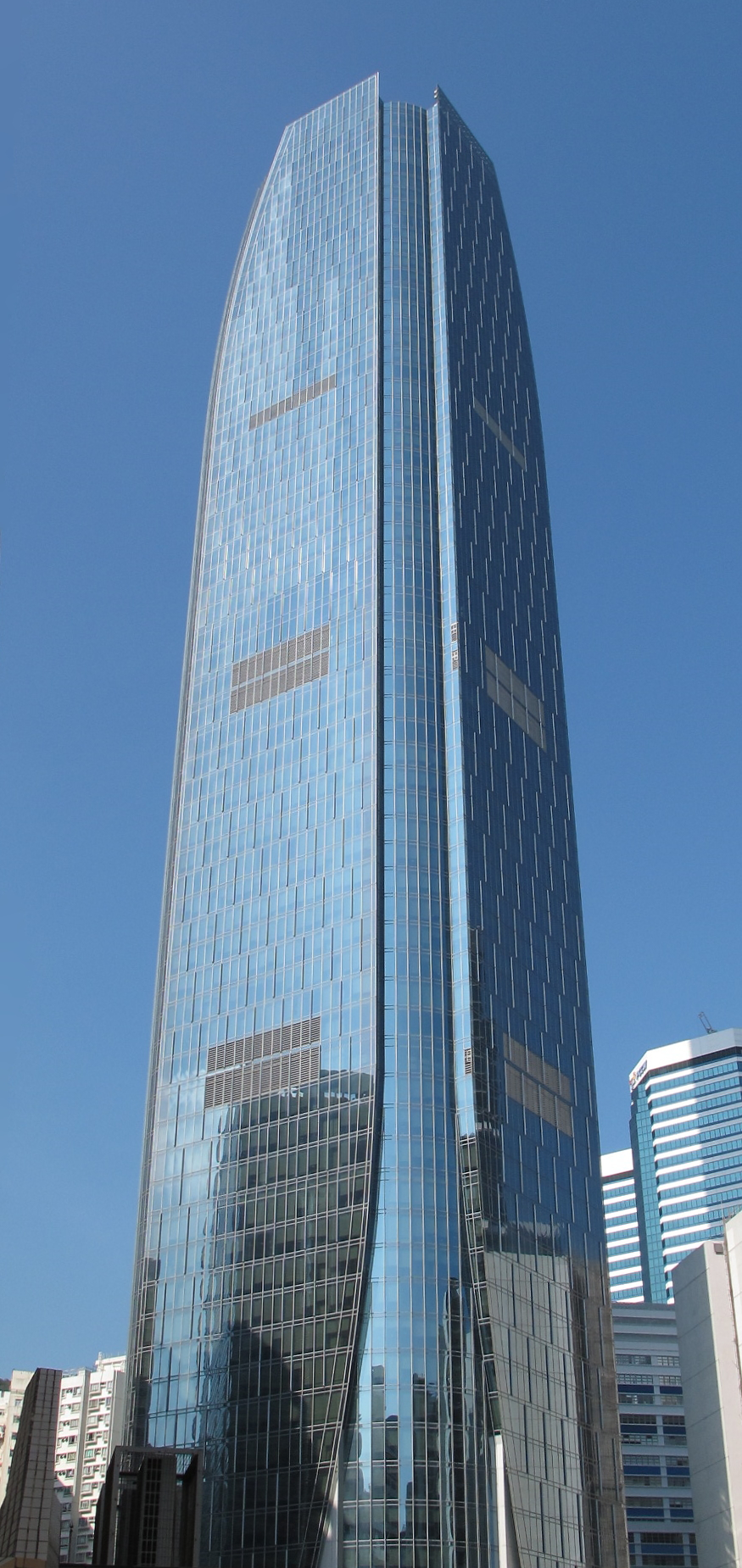
- One Island East, which houses the agency's head office

Agency overview
- Formed: May 1989; 37 years ago
- Jurisdiction: Hong Kong
- Headquarters: One Island East, 18 Westlands Road, Quarry Bay, Hong Kong
- Agency executives: Kelvin Wong, Chairman; Julia Leung, Chief Executive Officer
- Website: sfc.hk

Securities and Futures Commission
- Traditional Chinese: 證券及期貨事務監察委員會
- Simplified Chinese: 证券及期货事务监察委员会
Transcriptions
Standard Mandarin
- Hanyu Pinyin: Zhèngquàn jí Qīhuò Shìwù Jiānchá Wěiyuánhuì
Yue: Cantonese
- Yale Romanization: Jing hyun kahp kèih fo sih mouh gāam chaat wái yùhn wuih
- Jyutping: Zing^{3} hyun^{3} kap^{6} kei^{4} fo^{3} si^{6} mou^{6} gaam^{1} caat^{3} wai^{2} jyun^{4} wui^{6}

The Securities and Futures Commission (SFC) is the independent statutory body of Hong Kong charged with regulating securities and futures markets. The SFC is responsible for fostering an orderly securities and futures markets, to protect investors and to help promote Hong Kong as an international financial centre and a key financial market in Asia. Even though it is considered to be a branch of the government, it is run independently under the authorisation of Hong Kong laws relating to securities and futures.

The head office is in 54/F, One Island East, 18 Westlands Road, Quarry Bay.

== History ==
The SFC was created in 1989 in response to the stock market crash of 1987.

In 1997 following the Asian financial crisis, the regulatory framework was further improved.

A comprehensive Securities and Futures Ordinance (SFO) was implemented in 2003, which expanded the SFC's regulatory functions and powers.

Andrew Sheng served as chairman of the SFC from 1998 until 2005, when he was succeeded by Martin Wheatley. Wheatley first served as chairman, and became CEO in 2006 when the posts of chairman and CEO were segregated to further promote corporate governance. Eddy Fong was appointed non-executive chairman in 2006. Ashley Alder assumed the position of CEO in 2011 and Carlson Tong was appointed non-executive chairman in 2012. In late 2022, Julia Leung was named as chief executive officer of the SFC.

== Responsibilities ==
The SFC is one of four regulatory organisations that make up financial regulators in Hong Kong, one of the major financial centres in the world. The others are the Hong Kong Monetary Authority, Insurance Authority and the Mandatory Provident Fund Schemes Authority. The SFC is responsible for securities and futures markets including the Stock Exchange of Hong Kong (SEHK), the seventh largest stock exchange in the world (See list of stock exchanges).

The SFC has a responsibility to maintain order and protect investors, it does this by carrying out the following tasks:

- Setting and enforcing market regulations
- Licensing and supervising market participants such as brokers, investment advisers and fund managers
- Supervising market operators including exchanges, automated trading services and clearing houses
- Authorising offering documents of investment products to be offered to the public
- Overseeing corporate activities of listed companies under the Codes on Takeovers and Mergers and Share Repurchases
- Educating investors on markets, investment products and their risks

== Structure ==
The SFC is an independent statutory body whose powers derive from the Securities and Futures Ordinance (SFO) legislation.

The SFC is made up of a board of directors whose members are appointed by the Chief Executive of Hong Kong for a fixed term, a majority of which must be non-executive directors. The board is headed by the chairman also appointed by the Chief Executive of Hong Kong.

An executive committee led by a chief executive officer (CEO) reports to the board and the board chairman and he runs the agency on a day-to-day basis; this position was created in 2006.

The SFC is funded by levies on transactions conducted on the SEHK and the Hong Kong Futures Exchange (HKFE), as well as fees charged to market participants.

=== List of chairmen ===
1. Robert John Richard Owen (1989–1992)
2. Robert William Nottle (1992–1994)
3. Anthony Francis Neoh (1995–1998)
4. Andrew Sheng Len-tao (1998–2005)
5. Martin Wheatley (2005–2006)
6. Eddy Fong Ching (2006–2012)
7. Carlson Tong Ka-shing (2012–2018)
8. Tim Lui Tim-leung (2018–2024)
9. Kelvin Wong Tin-yau (since October 2024)

=== List of CEOs ===
The position of CEO was created in 2006. The list of CEOs is:

1. Martin Wheatley (2006–2011)
2. Ashley Ian Alder (2011–2022)
3. Julia Leung Fung-yee (since January 2023)

== HKSI Licensing Examination ==
The Licensing Examination for Securities and Futures Intermediaries (LE), a practical and market-focused examination, was developed with the assistance of regulators, academics and practitioners drawn from across the financial services industry. Its delegated by the SFC and conducted by the Hong Kong Securities and Investment Institute.

=== Criticisms ===
The Hong Kong Securities and Investment Institute faces a lot of criticisms since the test were not checked or validated independently before implemented to the examinations. In addition to that, no formal appeal procedures or practices are in place to check and balances the legitimacy of such examinations. Discrepancies between different languages are commonplace with these examinations.

Candidates should be aware that neither SFC nor the Hong Kong Securities and Investment Institute (HKSI) endorses any study notes or practice questions.

== Cryptocurrencies ==
Criticized for its response to JPEX, the SFC in September 2023 said that it would not publish a list of businesses applying for cryptocurrency licenses; a week later, the SFC backtracked and said it would publish it.

== Activity/ Operations ==
On 10 March 2026, the SFC and the Independent Commission Against Corruption of Hong Kong raided Guotai Junan International's office with search warrants, seized certain documents and detained an employee.

== See also ==
- Securities commission
- Financial Services and the Treasury Bureau
- Economy of Hong Kong
- Hong Kong Monetary Authority
- List of financial supervisory authorities by country
