= James Lau =

Hong Kong government official

James Lau JP
- 劉怡翔
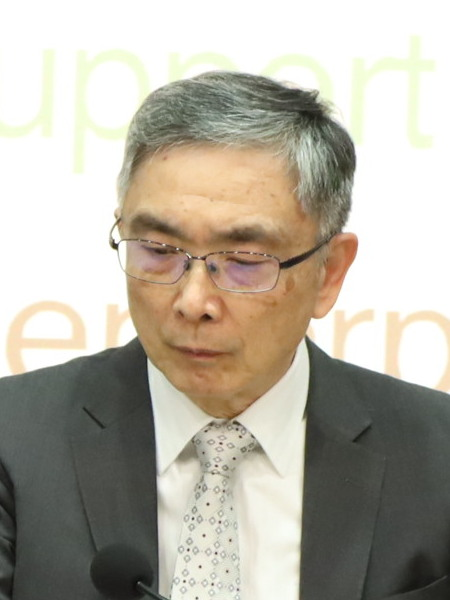
- Lau in 2020

Secretary for Financial Services and the Treasury
- In office 1 July 2017 – 22 April 2020
- Chief Executive: Carrie Lam
- Preceded by: KC Chan
- Succeeded by: Christopher Hui

Personal details
- Born: 24 April 1950 (age 76) Hong Kong
- Education: University of Waterloo (BMath)

James Henry Lau Jr. or Lau Yee Cheung (Chinese: 劉怡翔; born 24 April 1950) is a Hong Kong government official. He was Secretary for Financial Services and the Treasury from 2017 to 2020.

Lau graduated from the University of Waterloo with a Bachelor of Mathematics (Computer Science and Statistics) Honours Degree and a Master of Mathematics Degree in Computer Science.

He joined the Hong Kong government as an Administrative Officer (AO) in 1979 and was promoted through the ranks to AO Staff Grade C. He resigned in 1993 to join the Hong Kong Monetary Authority (HKMA). Between 1993 and 2004 he was the Head and Executive Director of various divisions of the HKMA.

In 2004, Lau was seconded to the Hong Kong Mortgage Corporation as Chief Executive Officer until he retired in 2012. In 2013, he was appointed Under Secretary for Financial Services and the Treasury.

From 2017 to 2020, he served as Secretary for Financial Services and the Treasury in the administration of Chief Executive Carrie Lam. He was removed in a cabinet reshuffle, on 22 April 2020.

Political offices
Preceded by Julia Leung	Under Secretary for Financial Services and the Treasury; 2014–2017	Succeeded by Joseph Chan
Preceded by KC Chan	Secretary for Financial Services and the Treasury; 2017–present	Succeeded by Christopher Hui
