= Andrew Sheng =

Malaysian banker, academic and commentator (born 1946)

- Traditional Chinese: 沈聯濤
- Simplified Chinese: 沈联涛
Transcriptions
Standard Mandarin
- Hanyu Pinyin: Shěn Liántāo
Yue: Cantonese
- Jyutping: Sam2 Lyun4 Tou4
Southern Min
- Hokkien POJ: Sím Liân-tô
- Tâi-lô: Sím Liân-tô

Tan Sri Andrew Sheng SBS (born 1946), is Hong Kong–based Malaysian banker, academic and commentator. He started his career as an accountant and is now a distinguished fellow of Fung Global Institute, a global think tank based in Hong Kong. He served as chairman of the Hong Kong Securities and Futures Commission (SFC) before his replacement by Martin Wheatley in 2005. In 2026, he was appointed as the adviser for the government of Sabah in economic matters by the state chief minister.

== Early life ==
Sheng grew up in British North Borneo (today Sabah, Malaysia). He left Malaysia in 1965 to attend the University of Bristol in England, where he studied economics.

== Career ==
Following his graduation, Sheng moved to London and joined Arthur Andersen to train as a chartered accountant. After seven years in England, he returned to Malaysia in 1972, and four years later took up a position at Bank Negara Malaysia, where he did work involving banking regulation. In 1989 he was seconded to the World Bank office in Washington, DC; he came back to Asia in 1993 to serve as deputy chief executive of the Hong Kong Monetary Authority. After that, he was appointed to his position on Hong Kong's SFC in October 1998; Tung Chee Hwa re-appointed him in October 2003 for a further two years. In 2005, he stepped down in favour of Wheatley, who had joined the SFC the year prior after being removed from his position at the London Stock Exchange. Sheng became president of Fung Global Institute, an independent, global think tank based in Hong Kong, in 2011. Since 2011, Sheng has written columns for Project Syndicate, a non-profit international media organisation.

In 2012, Sheng was awarded by the Hong Kong Securities and Investment Institute (HKSI Institute) as Honorary Fellow. Since 2013, Sheng is also the chief adviser to the China Banking Regulatory Commission and a board member of Khazanah Nasional Berhad, Malaysia. In addition, he serves as a member of the International Advisory Council of the China Investment Corporation, the China Development Bank, the Advisory Council on Shanghai as an International Financial Centre and the International Council of the Free University of Berlin. He is also an adjunct professor at the Tsinghua University School of Economics and Management, Beijing and the University of Malaya, Kuala Lumpur. In 2013, Time magazine named Sheng as one of the 100 most influential people in the world.

In 2026, Sheng was appointed by the state government of Sabah as the special adviser to the Chief Minister Hajiji Noor to assist the government in the economic and investment sectors.

== Works ==
- Sheng, Andrew (2009), From Asian to global financial crisis: an Asian regulator's view of unfettered finance in the 1990s and 2000s, Cambridge University Press, ISBN 978-0-521-13415-6

== Quotes ==
- "Why should a financial engineer be paid four to a hundred times more than a real engineer? A real engineer builds bridges. A financial engineer builds dreams and, when those dreams turn out to be nightmares, other people pay for it." —Andrew Sheng, in an interview for the 2010 financial industry documentary Inside Job.
