= WeLab =

Hong Kong financial technology company

WeLab Limited
- Company type: Private
- Industry: Financial technology
- Founded: January 2013; 12 years ago
- Founder: Simon Loong; Kelly Wong
- Headquarters: Hong Kong
- Key people: Simon Loong (CEO); Ernest Leung (COO)
- Website: welab.co

WeLab Limited is a Hong Kong financial technology company offering a range of services, such as online consumer credit platforms and virtual banking. It was founded in January 2013 by Simon Loong, Kelly Wong and Frances Kang and is best known for being the parent company of WeLab Bank, one of the first virtual banks to be granted a license to operate in Hong Kong.

Outside of Hong Kong, WeLab also operates in mainland China and Indonesia. As of 2020, WeLab had over 40 million customers and facilitated over HK$50 billion in loans.

== History ==
WeLab Limited was first established on 22 November 2012 in Hong Kong as WeLend, but began operating as WeLab in January 2013. Later that year, WeLend launched as a standalone product – Hong Kong's first online consumer credit lending platform. In 2014, WeLab began to expand outside of Hong Kong, first into mainland China with Wolaidai (我来贷), then into Indonesia in 2018.

In April 2019, WeLab was granted Hong Kong's fourth virtual banking licence, and the company launched WeLab Bank.

=== Funding ===
==== Series A ====
In January 2015, WeLab raised US$20 million in its Series A fundraising round. Key investors include CK Hutchison's TOM Group, Silicon Valley venture capital firm Sequoia Capital, Yuri Milner founder of DST Global, ICONIQ Capital, and Ule.com, a joint venture between China Post (China's state-owned postal service) and TOM Group.

==== Series B ====
In January 2016, WeLab raised US$160 million in its Series B fundraising from a consortium of international and domestic Chinese investors led by Khazanah Nasional Berhad. Other investors include ING Bank and the state-owned Guangdong Technology Financial Group (GTFG). This fundraising round was ranked as the 5th largest FinTech fundraising round out of 413 deals across the globe in the first half of 2016.

In November 2017, WeLab raised US$220 million in its new financing from Alibaba Entrepreneurs Fund and global financial institutions China Construction Bank (International), Credit Suisse and the World Bank's International Finance Corporation.

==== Series C ====
In late 2019, WeLab raised US$156 million (HK$1.2 billion) of Series C strategic financing, bringing its total funding to over $580 million.

In March 2021, WeLab raised US$75 million in a Series C1 from Allianz X, a venture capital arm of European financial conglomerate Allianz.

== Brands ==
Company	Markets served	Sector
Taoxinji	China	Lending
Tianmian Lab	China	B2B FinTech services
Wallet Gugu	China	Payments
WeLab Digital	China	Lending
WeLab Bank	Hong Kong	Banking
WeLab Pay	Hong Kong	Payments
WeLend	Hong Kong	Lending
Bank Jasa Jakarta	Indonesia	Banking
Maucash	Indonesia	Lending

== Leadership ==
- Group Chief Executive Officer: Simon Loong (since January 2013)
