= Government Property Agency (Hong Kong) =

Government agency of Hong Kong

- 政府產業署

Agency overview
- Formed: April 1990
- Jurisdiction: Government of Hong Kong
- Headquarters: 8-9/F, South Tower West Kowloon Government Offices, 11 Hoi Ting Road, Yau Ma Tei, Hong Kong; 22°16′47″N 114°10′19″E
- Employees: ~300
- Agency executives: Raymond Sy (Administrator); Aaricf Mok (Deputy Administrator)
- Parent department: Financial Services and the Treasury Bureau
- Website: www.gpa.gov.hk

Government Property Agency (GPA) is an agency under the Financial Services and the Treasury Bureau of the Government of Hong Kong. Established on 1 April 1990, the Agency manages the government properties which were distributed among Government Secretariat (former Finance Branch), Lands Department, Rating and Valuation Department and Architectural Services Department.

== History ==
The Government Property Agency was established on 1st April 1990. Its main functions are provide suitable government accommodation to enable efficient delivery of public services, to meet the Government's needs for accommodation through optimal use of and necessary adjustments to the current stock, to provide management services for government properties through the most cost-effective means available. To modernise government properties to meet changing operational and statutory requirements, to optimise the utilisation of government sites in conjunction with other concerned departments.

The Present Head of Department is Raymond Sy and the Deputy Head is Aaricf Mok.

=== Previous Departmental Head ===
- 麥景禮, Mr Philip Mackely (April 1990 – November 1991);
- 胡德品, Mr Ian Wotherspoon (November 1991 – April 1997);
- 賴國鍈, Mr Albert LAI (April 1997 – July 2001);
- 莫錦鈞, Mr MOK Kam-kwan (Acting, July – August 2001);
- 關錫寧, Ms Marina KWAN (August 2001 – June 2006);
- 郭家強, Mr Keith KWOK (June 2006 – October 2011);
- 蕭如彬, Mr Alan SIU (October 2011 – November 2015 );
- 詹婉珊, Ms Sandy JIM (Acting, November – December 2015 );
- 袁民忠, Mr Tommy YUEN (December 2015 – January 2019);
- 劉明光, Mr Vincent LIU (January 2019 – October 2019);
- 蔡民偉, Mr Leo CHOY (Acting, October 2019 – November 2019);
- 戴淑嬈, Miss Leonia TAI (November 2019 - September 2021);
- 馮建業, Mr Eugene FUNG (13 September 2021 - 5 April 2026);
- 莫振宇, Mr Aaricf MOK (Acting, 6 April 2026 – 5 May 2026);
- 施金獎, Mr Raymond SY (6 May 2026 - )

=== Previous Deputy Departmental Head ===
- 黃飛鵬 Mr FP WONG,
- 曾梅芬 Mrs Mimi BROWN,
- 莫錦鈞 Mr KK MOK,
- 鄧炳光 Mr PK TANG,
- 蔡立耀 Mr LY CHOI,
- 嚴惠敏 Miss Christina YIM,
- 詹婉珊 Ms Sandy JIM,
- 蕭家賢 Mr Kevin SIU,
- 蔡民偉 Mr Leo CHOY,
- 陳子平 Mr Ronald CHAN,
- 莫振宇 Mr Aaricf MOK,
