= David Chung Wai-keung =

Hong Kong politician (born 1966)

- 鍾偉強

1st Under Secretary for Innovation and Technology
- Incumbent
- Assumed office 1 March 2016

Personal details
- Born: 1966 (age 59–60)
- Education: City University of Hong Kong (EngD); Open University of Hong Kong (MBA); Chinese University of Hong Kong (PGDM); Imperial College London (BEng)

David Chung Wai-keung JP (Chinese: 鍾偉強) is a Hong Kong politician. He has been the Under Secretary for Innovation and Technology of the Hong Kong Special Administrative Region since 1 March 2016.

Prior to appointed to the position, Chung worked as Chief Technology Officer (2011 - 2016) and Head of IT Office (2008 - 2010) at Hong Kong Cyberport Management Company Limited. He was also a winner of the "China Top 5 CIO Award" in 2013.

Chung holds a Bachelor of Science (Engineering) in Computer Science from Imperial College London, a Postgraduate Diploma in Business Management from the Chinese University of Hong Kong, a Master of Business Administration from the Open University of Hong Kong and a Doctorate in Engineering Management from City University of Hong Kong.

On 5 January 2022, Carrie Lam announced new warnings and restrictions against social gathering due to potential COVID-19 outbreaks. One day later, it was discovered that Chung attended a birthday party hosted by Witman Hung Wai-man, with 222 guests. At least one guest tested positive with COVID-19, causing all guests to be quarantined.
