= Sandra Birch Lee =

Hong Kong civil servant

Sandra Birch Lee GBS JP
- 李淑儀

Permanent Secretary for Food and Health (Health)
- In office July 2007 – September 2011
- Preceded by: Herself (as Permanent Secretary for Health, Welfare and Food (Health and Welfare))
- Succeeded by: Richard Yuen

Permanent Secretary for Health, Welfare and Food (Health and Welfare)
- In office May 2006 – June 2007
- Succeeded by: Herself (as Permanent Secretary for Food and Health (Health))

Permanent Secretary for Economic Development and Labour (Economic Development)
- In office 1 July 2002 – April 2006
- Preceded by: Herself (as Secretary for Economic Services)
- Succeeded by: Eva Cheng

Secretary for Economic Services
- In office 13 July 2000 – 30 June 2002
- Preceded by: Stephen Ip
- Succeeded by: Stephen Ip (as Secretary for Economic Development and Labour)

Personal details
- Born: 9 March 1952 (age 74) British Hong Kong
- Education: University of Hong Kong (BA)

Sandra Birch Lee
- Traditional Chinese: 李淑儀
- Simplified Chinese: 李淑仪
Transcriptions
Standard Mandarin
- Hanyu Pinyin: Lǐ Shúyí

Sandra Birch Lee Suk-yee GBS JP (born 9 March 1952) is a former Hong Kong civil servant who served as the permanent secretary of four different bureaus in the 2000s.

== Education and civil service career ==
Lee attended the University of Hong Kong, where she was classmates in the history department with Alan Lai and Denise Yue, both of whom would go on to become senior civil servants. After graduating with a Bachelor of Arts degree in 1974, Lee joined the Hong Kong government as an executive officer in June of the same year. She became an administrative officer in 1979 and was successively promoted to Administrative Officer Staff Grade B1 in January 1997 and Administrative Officer Staff Grade A1 in July 2002.

During her career in the civil service, Lee variously served as the deputy head of the Hong Kong Economic and Trade Office in Washington, DC from 1985 to 1988 and from 1993 to 1995, as Deputy Director of Home Affairs from 1995 to 1996, as Deputy Secretary for the Civil Service from 1996 to 1999, and as Director General of the HKETO in London from 1999 to 2000.

Lee was elevated to the Executive Council in 2000 as Secretary for Economic Services in a reshuffle of Chief Executive Tung Chee-hwa's first government. With the introduction of the Principal Officials Accountability System in 2002, the heads of government bureaux became political appointees, with the most senior civil servant in a bureau retitled as permanent secretaries, with no seat on the Executive Council. Lee continued to serve as the most senior civil servant overseeing the economic development portfolio as Permanent Secretary for Economic Development from 2002 to 2006, before being reassigned to the Health, Welfare, and Food Bureau in 2006 to become Permanent Secretary for Health, Welfare, and Food (Health and Welfare). She continued to oversee the health brief when the bureau was reorganised in 2007 to become the Food and Health Bureau until she retired from the civil service in 2011.

== Post-retirement ==
Lee was a core member of former Financial Secretary John Tsang's campaign team in the 2017 Chief Executive election. She was appointed as a lay member of the Medical Council of Hong Kong in 2018.

== See also ==
- Hong Kong Civil Service

Political offices
Preceded by Stephen Ip	Secretary for Economic Services; 2000–2002	Succeeded by Stephen Ip as Secretary for Economic Development and Labour
Order of precedence
Preceded by Francis Ho; Recipients of the Gold Bauhinia Star	Hong Kong order of precedence Recipients of the Gold Bauhinia Star	Succeeded by Felice Lieh-mak; Recipients of the Gold Bauhinia Star
