= Michael David Cartland =

Hong Kong government official (born 1945)

Michael David Cartland OBE (Chinese: 簡德倫; born 8 October 1945) was the Secretary for Financial Services of Hong Kong during British rule in the 1990s and consultant based in Hong Kong.

Cartland's career in Hong Kong began with formulating trade policy during the 1980s. He was the territory's first Permanent Representative to the GATT. He helped Hong Kong in the Uruguay Round and was chair of the Negotiating Group on Subsidies and Countervail at Uruguay. Cartland chaired various panels in GATT and the WTO from 1986 to 2007. After retirement Cartland joined his wife Rachel (ex-Hong Kong Civil servant from 1972 to 2006) to form a public sector consulting company. In 1993 he was appointed Secretary for Financial Services.

Cartland was required to retire in the interests of localisation under the compensation scheme which applied to all expatriate non-Chinese officers with similar seniority in the run up to the handover of sovereignty in 1997. He was replaced towards the end of 1995 as Secretary for Financial Services by Rafael Hui.

Earlier in his career Cartland had spent the decade of the eighties dealing with Hong Kong trade policy and had become Hong Kong's first Permanent Representative to the GATT when Hong Kong became a full member of that organisation in its own right in 1986. He participated in that capacity in the launching of the Uruguay Round and went on to chair the Negotiating Group on Subsidies and Countervail during the Round. As a friend of the Chair at the end of the Round he helped the then Director General, Peter Sutherland, to bring the negotiations to a conclusion in the areas of Anti-Dumping, Safeguards, Intellectual Property, Government Procurement, as well as Subsidies and Countervail. He also made a substantial contribution to GATT and WTO Dispute Settlement by chairing the panels in no less than sixteen cases over the twenty years to 2005.

Cartland and his wife Rachel are now public sector consultants (Cartland Consulting Limited) in Hong Kong.

| Preceded by: David Nendick | Secretary for Financial Services; 1993-1995 | Succeeded by: Rafael Hui |
