= WeLab Bank =

Virtual bank in Hong Kong

WeLab Bank (匯立銀行)
- Type: Subsidiary
- Industry: Virtual Banking
- Founded: Established on 21 August 2018; 8 years ago; Launched on 30 July 2020; 6 years ago
- Headquarters: Quarry Bay, Hong Kong
- Key people: Ceajer Chan (Chairman); Ernest Leung (Chief Executive)
- Parent: WeLab
- Website: welab.bank

WeLab Bank Limited (Chinese: 匯立銀行) is a virtual bank and a wholly owned subsidiary of WeLab.

== History ==
=== Founding to launch (2018–2020) ===
In 2017, the Hong Kong Monetary Authority (HKMA) began to explore the need to accelerate the development of FinTech firms in Hong Kong, particularly virtual banks. By 2018, the HKMA had begun the application process for a virtual banking license in Hong Kong, with the first deadline being 31 August 2018. In response to this initiative, WeLab established WeLab Digital Limited on 21 August 2018, and submitted an application before the first deadline; William Leung was appointed in December 2018 to oversee the application process. WeLab Digital Limited changed its name to WeLab Bank Limited on 16 September 2019.

On 10 April 2019, WeLab Bank became the fourth bank to be awarded a virtual banking license in Hong Kong, becoming the first homegrown startup to do so. On the same day, WeLab Bank announced that current WeLab senior advisor Ceajer Chan would become its Chairman. WeLab Bank announced the launch of its Pilot Trial 1 year later on 28 April 2020, in which 2,000 users (selected from a pool of staff members, family and friends of staff, and the official waiting list) will be given early access to WeLab Bank's banking products.

WeLab Bank officially launched to the public on 30 July 2020, 3 months after their pilot trial began and nearly 2 years after the company was established.

=== Since launch (2020–) ===
WeLab Bank became the third virtual bank in Hong Kong to launch, and more than 10,000 accounts were opened within the first 10 days of launch.

== Product Scope ==
WeLab Bank currently offers deposit services (savings accounts and time deposits) and loans to individual customers.

== Leadership ==
- Chairman: Ceajer Chan (since April 2019)
- Chief Executive: Ernest Leung (since November 2026)

=== List of former chief executives ===
1. William Leung (2018–2019)
2. Adrian Tse (2020–2021)
3. Tat Lee (2021–2026)

=== Board of directors ===
Appointed	Name	Role	Principal Occupation	Notes
21 August 2018	Simon Loong	Non-executive Director	Co-founder and Chief Executive of WeLab Limited	Co-founder of the parent company of WeLab Bank
21 August 2018	Ceajer Chan	Non-executive Director	Chairman of WeLab Bank	Chairman
3 March 2021	Ernest Leung	Non-executive Director	Chief Operating Officer of Welab Limited	COO of the parent company of WeLab Bank
1 June 2019	Lee Ka Tat	Executive Director	Chief Executive of WeLab Bank	Chief Executive
1 June 2019	Donald Roberts	Independent Non-executive Director	Former Group Deputy Chief Financial Officer of Hutchison Whampoa Limited	
30 August 2019	Irene Chang	Independent Non-executive Director	Former Retail Credit Head at Citibank	
