= Secretary for Financial Services and the Treasury =

Position in the Hong Kong Government

Hong Kong Special Administrative Region Secretary for Financial Services and the Treasury 財經事務及庫務局局長
- Emblem of Hong Kong

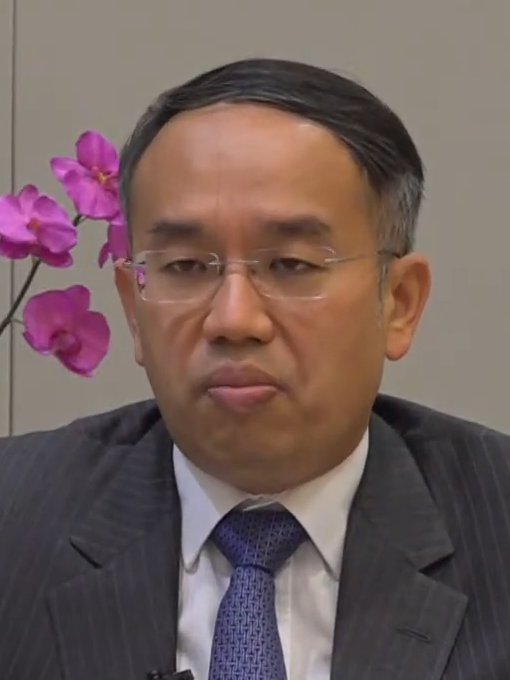
- Incumbent; Christopher Hui since 22 April 2020
- Financial Services and the Treasury Bureau
- Style: The Honourable
- Appointer: Central People's Government nomination by Chief Executive
- Inaugural holder: Rafael Hui; Secretary for Financial Services; Frederick Ma; Secretary for Financial Services and the Treasury
- Formation: 1 July 1997; 1 July 2002
- Salary: HK$4,021,200 per annum
- Website: FSTB

Secretary for Financial Services and the Treasury
- Traditional Chinese: 財經事務及庫務局局長
Transcriptions
Yue: Cantonese
- Yale Romanization: Chòih gīng sih mouh kahp fu mouh guhk guhk jéung
- Jyutping: Coi^{4} ging^{1} si^{6} mou^{6} kap^{6} fu^{3} mou^{6} guk^{6} guk^{6} zoeng^{2}

The Secretary for Financial Services and the Treasury, head of Financial Services and the Treasury Bureau of the Hong Kong Government, is responsible for the monitoring of financial services sector and maintaining the assets of the government.

The position was created on 1 July 2002, when the Principal Officials Accountability System was introduced, by merging the previous positions of Secretary for the Treasury and Secretary for Financial Services.

== List of office holders ==
Political party: Nonpartisan Democratic Alliance for the Betterment and Progress of Hong Kong (DAB)

=== Secretary for Monetary Affairs, 1976–1993 ===
No.	Portrait	Name	Term of office		Governor	Ref
1		Douglas Blye 白禮宜	1976	1985	Sir Murray MacLehose (1971–1982)	
1		Douglas Blye 白禮宜	1976	1985	Sir Edward Youde (1982–1986)	
2		David Nendick 林定國	1985	1992	Sir Edward Youde (1982–1986)	
2		David Nendick 林定國	1985	1992	Sir David Wilson (1987–1992)	
2		David Nendick 林定國	1985	1992	Chris Patten (1992–1997)	
3		Michael David Cartland 簡德倫	January 1993	April 1993	Chris Patten (1992–1997)	

=== Secretary for Financial Services, 1993–1997 ===
No.	Portrait	Name	Term of office		Governor	Ref
1		Michael David Cartland 簡德倫	April 1993	1995	Chris Patten (1992–1997)	
2		Rafael Hui 許仕仁	1995	30 June 1997	Chris Patten (1992–1997)	

=== Secretary for Financial Services, 1997–2002 ===
No.	Portrait	Name	Term of office		Duration	Chief Executive	Term	Ref
1		Rafael Hui Si-yan 許仕仁	1 July 1997	31 May 2000	2 years, 335 days	Tung Chee-hwa (1997–2005)	1	
2		Stephen Ip Shue-kwan 葉澍堃	13 June 2002	30 June 2002	17 days	Tung Chee-hwa (1997–2005)	1	

=== Secretaries for Financial Services and the Treasury, 2002–present ===
No.	Portrait	Name	Term of office		Duration	Chief Executive	Term	Ref
1		Frederick Ma Si-hang 馬時亨	1 July 2002	30 June 2007	5 years, 0 days	Tung Chee-hwa (1997–2005)	2	
1		Frederick Ma Si-hang 馬時亨	1 July 2002	30 June 2007	5 years, 0 days	Donald Tsang (2005–2012)	2	
2		KC Chan 陳家強	1 July 2007	30 June 2017	10 years, 0 days	Donald Tsang (2005–2012)	3	
2		KC Chan 陳家強	1 July 2007	30 June 2017	10 years, 0 days	Leung Chun-ying (2012–2017)	4	
3		James Henry Lau 劉怡翔	1 July 2017	22 April 2020	2 years, 296 days	Carrie Lam (2017–2022)	5	
4		Christopher Hui Ching-yu 許正宇	22 April 2020	Incumbent	6 years, 172 days	Carrie Lam (2017–2022)	5	
4		Christopher Hui Ching-yu 許正宇	22 April 2020	Incumbent	6 years, 172 days	John Lee (2022–present)	6	

==== Under Secretary for Financial Services and the Treasury ====
- Julia Leung (2008–2013)
- James Lau (2014–2017)
- Joseph Chan (2017–present)
