= Stephen Ip =

Hong Kong writer (born 1951)

- Traditional Chinese: 葉澍堃
- Simplified Chinese: 叶澍堃
Transcriptions
Standard Mandarin
- Hanyu Pinyin: Yè Shùkūn

Stephen Ip Shue-kwan, GBS, JP (born 1951) is a former politician in Hong Kong, he was Secretary for Economic Development and Labour for the Hong Kong Special Administrative Region from 2002 to 2007.

The post of Secretary for Economic Development and Labour is a political appointment. Ip was Secretary for Economic Services in June 1996 under Chris Patten's colonial administration, until he took up his last civil service post of Secretary for Financial Services in June 2000. In 2005, he proposed a 25–50% decrease in port fees to increase Hong Kong's competitiveness in the Pearl River Delta Economic Zone.

After his retirement, he became a food critic. He is currently writing columns for Headline Daily.

Political offices
Preceded by Gordon Siu	Secretary for Economic Services; 1996–2000	Succeeded by Sandra Lee
Preceded by Rafael Hui	Secretary for Financial Services; 2000–2002	Succeeded by Frederick Ma as Secretary for Financial Services and the Treasury
Preceded by Sandra Lee as Secretary for Economic Services	Secretary for Economic Development and Labour; 2002–2007	Succeeded by Frederick Ma as Secretary for Commerce and Economic Development
Preceded by Fanny Law as Secretary for Education and Manpower	Secretary for Economic Development and Labour; 2002–2007	Succeeded by Matthew Cheung as Secretary for Labour and Welfare
Order of precedence
Preceded by Denise Yue; Recipients of the Gold Bauhinia Star	Hong Kong order of precedence Recipients of the Gold Bauhinia Star	Succeeded by James Tien; Recipients of the Gold Bauhinia Star
