= David Webb (Hong Kong activist) =

Hong Kong activist investor (1965–2026)

David Webb MBE
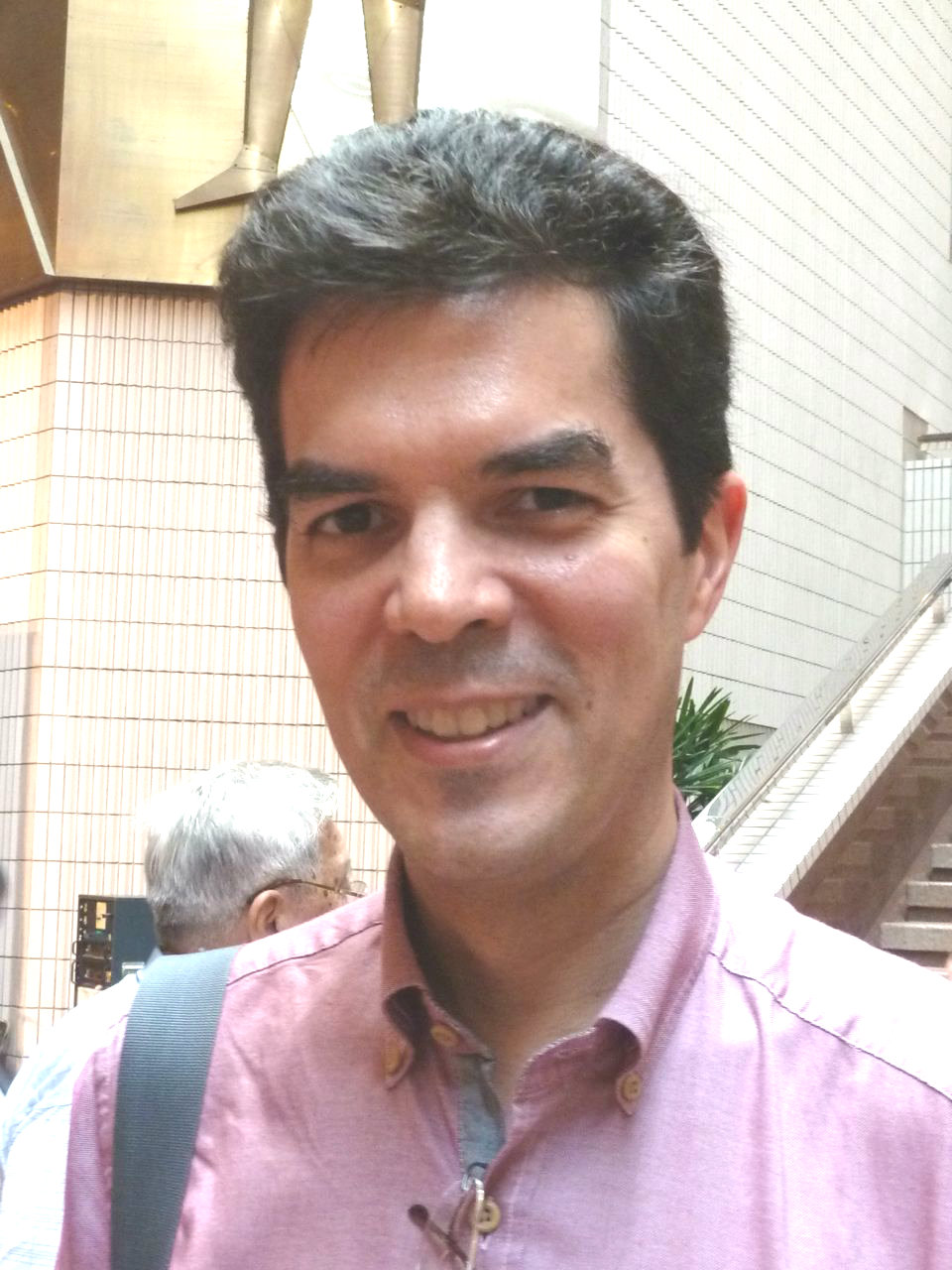
- Webb in 2013

Personal details
- Born: David Michael Webb; 29 August 1965 London, England
- Died: 13 January 2026 (aged 60) Hong Kong
- Spouse: Karen Anne Webb
- Children: 2
- Education: Exeter College, Oxford
- Occupation: Activist shareholder; advocate

David Michael Webb MBE (29 August 1965 – 13 January 2026) was a British-born Hong Kong activist investor, transparency advocate, and public data archivist and analyst. Long based in Hong Kong, he was once an investment banker. He maintained a large, open set of highly synthesised public data records, at Webb-site.com. In 2020, he announced that he had been diagnosed with an aggressive cancer but would maintain the database and his activism for as long as he could; Webb died in 2026.

== Early life ==
Webb was born in London on 29 August 1965. He graduated with a degree in mathematics from Exeter College, Oxford in 1986. From 1981 to 1986 he was also an author of books and games for early home computers, particularly the ZX Spectrum. He authored the Pac-Man-type game Spookyman and went on to create the acclaimed 3D Vector graphics game Starion on the Spectrum.

After graduation Webb became an investment banker in London. He moved to Hong Kong in 1991. He was a director in the corporate finance department of Barclays de Zoete Wedd (Asia) Limited (later Barclays Capital Asia Limited), the Hong Kong subsidiary of British universal bank Barclays, until 31 March 1994, when he moved to become an in-house adviser to Wheelock and Company Limited. He retired from Wheelock on 31 March 1998 at the age of 32 and in the same year, founded Webb-site.com, a non-profit platform to advocate better corporate and economic governance in Hong Kong.

Webb was appointed a Deputy Chairman of the Hong Kong Securities and Futures Commission's Takeover and Mergers Panel on 1 April 2013, having commenced serving as member on 1 April 2001.

== Webb-site and activism ==
From 1998, Webb built and maintained a set of Hong Kong public data records, at Webb-site.com, which he synthesized and cross-referenced in an accessible format, in pursuit of transparency. Information includes datasets and analyses for multiple aspects of: financial, securities, stock market data, directors and boards; government accounts, utilities and economic issues; members of judiciary, advisory and statutory bodies; SFC licensees, solicitors and other professionals; vehicle and traffic data; and notable people in Hong Kong.

Webb has been referred to as the "'Long Hair' of the financial markets" (in an allusion to Leung Kwok-hung), as his activism initially concerned mainly the finance sector.

In 2003, he launched "Project Poll", in which he purchased 10 shares in each of the 33 constituents of the Hang Seng Index, registering them in 5 names (himself, his wife and 3 BVI companies he owned) and used company law to demand poll voting (1 share, 1 vote) rather than a show of hands in all their shareholder meetings. This eventually led to a change of Hong Kong Listing Rules to require poll voting in all companies from 2009 onwards. Also in 2003, he launched Project VAMPIRE (Vote Against Mandate for Placings, Issues by Rights Excepted), to oppose resolutions that allow for massive issues of shares for cash without offering them to existing shareholders, negating pre-emption rights.

In December 2005, he advocated widening the electorate of the functional constituencies, arguing that professionals in fields such as bankers and stockbrokers should get to elect their own representatives. He observed then that only accountants, lawyers, doctors and teachers are able to exercise that right; stockbrokers were represented by convicted fraudster Chim Pui-chung, while the banking seat has only been contested once in 20 years. During the 2014 Hong Kong protests, he said that the economic impact of the protests was minor compared to the large economic benefits of a more dynamic economy that would come from democracy, ending collusion between the Government and the tycoons who currently elect the Chief executive.

=== Hong Kong Stock Exchange ===
Webb argued that there is inherently conflict between the commercial and regulatory roles of the Hong Kong Stock Exchange, and argued for a super-regulatory authority to assume that role. In the meantime, he argued for improved investor representation on the Hong Kong Stock Exchange. He was elected an independent non-executive director of Hong Kong Exchanges and Clearing Limited in 2003, and was re-elected by a landslide in April 2006.

In early 2007, Webb spoke up against the vested interests of smaller local stockbrokers acting against investors' interests, and was the only member to vote against reversing the decision by the former board of directors to cut minimum trading spreads for equities and warrants trading at between 25 HK cents and HK$2. The reforms were to be implemented in the first quarter, but were put back on the table following protests by brokers.

In September 2007, the government increased its stake in the Exchange from 4.41% to 5.88%. The Government declared the stake would be held by the Exchange Fund as a "strategic asset".

Webb remarked that the government was the second-largest single investor in the Hong Kong market after Beijing, with a portfolio of local equities estimated to be worth about HK$150 billion. He said the purchase violated the government's stated principle of "big market, small government". On top of already having its own appointed directors, the Government exercised its 63 million share-votes on directors' appointments as a shareholder at General Meeting in April 2008. Webb suggested that "As a 'strategic' investor, the government shouldn't have voted".

In May 2008, Webb resigned one year prior to the expiry of his term as an independent non-executive director, citing backdoor politics by the Government to install a professional board that would exclude retail investors and adopt more flexible standards for new listings; he also slammed the management for withholding information, which the management denied.

=== Cyberport ===
The Hong Kong government's project to develop a business park called "Cyberport" was controversially granted to PCCW, controlled by Richard Li, son of Hong Kong's wealthiest man Li Ka-Shing, without the benefit of a formal tender. In October 2004, Webb cited lack of transparency in the government's business dealings and demanded audited financial accounts and directors' reports for three companies related to the project, namely Hong Kong Cyberport Development Holdings Ltd., Hong Kong Cyberport Management Ltd. and Hong Kong Cyberport (Ancillary Development) Ltd., to be released under the non-statutory Code on Access to Information.

=== Disneyland ===
In 2005, Webb criticised the government for its lack of accountability, through its refusal to uphold a promise of independent directors on the board of Hong Kong Disneyland. The Hong Kong Government was heavily involved in the project, and is the company's 57% shareholder.

== Other work ==
Webb formerly led Hong Kong Mensa, the local chapter of the high-IQ society, between 1998 and 2000.

From 1999 to 2008, Webb made public an annual Christmas share tip where he recommended a single undervalued but well-run company. His picks are believed to have strongly influenced the price of selected stocks. However, The Standard criticised Webb after reporting that he himself owned holdings in his own Christmas share tip (which he had always disclosed), in one case giving himself almost a 40% unrealised profit on his holdings the day following publication of the tip. In December 2009, he announced an end to the "Christmas Pick" after a 10-year run in which they returned a cumulative 1118%, compared with an 87% return in the Hang Seng Index over that period, saying that the success of the picks "has become something of a distraction" to the main goal of raising the standards of Hong Kong's corporate and economic governance.

Webb was named as a "gadfly" in CFO Magazine's Global 100 in 2002.

In June 2025, Webb was named on the King's Birthday Honours List as a Member of the Order of the British Empire.

== Personal life and death ==
Webb was married to Karen Anne Webb and they had two children together.

On 8 June 2020, Webb announced on webb-site.com that he had been diagnosed with metastatic prostate cancer and would step back from in-depth research on listed companies. As the illness progressed, he maintained the webb-site.com database and much of his activism. In February 2025, with the prospect of his death imminent, and after unsuccessfully seeking ways to continue the site without him, Webb announced a phased closure of record maintenance.

Webb died on 13 January 2026, at the age of 60.
