= Christopher Hui =

Hong Kong politician (born 1976)

The Honourable Christopher Hui Ching-yu
- 許正宇
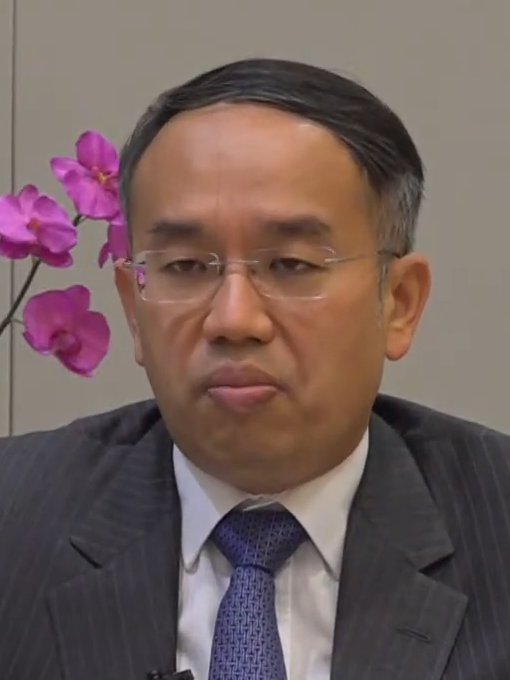
- Hui in 2020

Secretary for Financial Services and the Treasury
- Incumbent
- Assumed office 22 April 2020
- Chief Executive: Carrie Lam; John Lee
- Preceded by: James Lau

Personal details
- Born: 1976 (age 49–50) British Hong Kong
- Party: Democratic Alliance for the Betterment and Progress of Hong Kong (DAB)
- Education: University of Oxford; INSEAD

Christopher Hui Ching-yu (Chinese: 許正宇; born 1976) is a Hong Kong politician and government official. Since 2020, he has been Secretary for Financial Services and the Treasury.

== Biography ==
Hui is the son of a veteran pro-Beijinger Hui Wang-chuen who is a leader of one of the major Fujian associations in Hong Kong. His sister, Florence Hui, was an Under Secretary for Home Affairs. His wife, Rita Chan, is a managing director at J.P. Morgan.

Hui received his bachelor's degree from the University of Oxford, and his Master of Business Administration from the INSEAD graduate business school. In 1999, he was admitted as an Administrative Officer in the Government and served in the Economic Development Branch, the Office of the Government of the Hong Kong Special Administrative Region in Beijing and the Home Affairs Department until 2003.

After he left the government in 2003, Hui worked in the banking sector and became a managing director at Hong Kong Exchanges and Clearing for 12 years. He was also as a director of strategic development at New World Development, which was responsible for the development of the Greater Bay Area, the national plan to integrate Hong Kong with Macau, and other nine Guangdong cities, as a financial and technological powerhouse.

In 2008, he joined the Democratic Alliance for the Betterment and Progress of Hong Kong (DAB), the largest pro-Beijing party in Hong Kong, and has served on its standing committee. In 2014, he was appointed by Chief Executive Leung Chun-ying as a council member of City University of Hong Kong. In 2019, Hui was appointed executive director of the Hong Kong Financial Services Development Council.

== Secretary for Financial Services and the Treasury ==
In April 2020, Chief Executive Carrie Lam appointed Hui Secretary for Financial Services and the Treasury, one of the principal officials of the Hong Kong government, even as he remained a member of the DAB.

In December 2023, Hui defended Hong Kong's financial market, after data showed IPO proceeds at a 20 year low, and with mainland Chinese citizens criticizing the low performance and comparing Hong Kong Exchange Square to a historical relic tourist site.

=== Private Equity Market ===
Hui proposed a “3-Step” Strategy to further enhance Hong Kong's status as the leading private equity hub. As the first step, a new Limited Partnership Fund regime was introduced for investment funds to be registered in Hong Kong in the form of limited partnerships. In a year's time, over 300 funds have registered under the regime.

The second step is the passing of a legislation offering tax concession for carried interest issued by PE funds operating in Hong Kong, and the final step is to introduce a redomiciliation mechanism such that offshore funds may relocate to Hong Kong.

Hui is confident that the “3-Step” Strategy would greatly enhance the competitiveness of the Hong Kong market, and promote Hong Kong as one of the top global destinations for operation of PE and VC funds.

=== Financial technology ===
To enrich Hong Kong's Fintech talent pool, Hui announced the launch of “Fintech Anti-epidemic Scheme for Talent Development” in July 2020, creating 1,000 full-time job positions in Hong Kong Fintech companies.

During the Hong Kong FinTech Week 2020, he announced the launch of the “Fintech Proof-of-Concept Subsidy Scheme”, with a view to encouraging traditional financial institutions to partner with Fintech companies and initiate Proof-of-Concept projects on innovative FinTech solutions. Hui said he sees opportunities in solutions that can facilitate development of WealthTech, RegTech, InsurTech and payment systems, etc.

Further to a market consultation, Hui proposed that a licensing regime to be established for Virtual Asset Service Providers (VASPs) in Hong Kong. Hui is of view that, while protecting investors and safeguarding against money laundering and terrorist financing are the key objectives, the regime will also facilitate the development of a market for virtual assets in Hong Kong.

=== Global Financial Leaders’ Investment Summit ===
On 30 October 2022, Hui said that the Global Financial Leaders’ Investment Summit will show the world that Hong Kong is "open for business" and that "one of our advantages is that we are open to the world" despite guests to the Summit being allowed to eat at restaurants during their first 3 days in Hong Kong, when normal visitors to Hong Kong are not allowed to.

=== Crowdfunding ===
In December 2022, Hui proposed new legislation to regulate all crowdfunding activities, and said some people had used crowdfunding to endanger national security.

== Controversies ==
In February 2021, Hui said that the government would take proactive measures to counter American sanctions under Executive Order 13936, but did not give clear details on how he would do so.

In April 2021, Hui proposed making certain information in the Companies Registry hidden, a move which David Webb said would be detrimental and "How ironic that the government passed a law in 2019 prohibiting face masks in public assemblies so that people could be identifiable, arguably deterring them from committing crimes, but now wants to mask the identities of people trading with the privilege of limited liability, incentivising fraud and corruption."

On 5 January 2022, Carrie Lam announced new warnings and restrictions against social gathering due to potential COVID-19 outbreaks. One day later, it was discovered that Hui attended a birthday party hosted by Witman Hung Wai-man, with 222 guests. At least one guest tested positive with COVID-19, causing all guests to be quarantined. He was ordered to take leave until 24 January.

In April 2023, protesters rallied against Hui when he visited the UK to meet with British ministers, with one protester saying "The [Chinese Communist Party]'s human rights violators have no place in British business, government or culture."

== Personal life ==
Hui and his family own 7 registrable properties, including 4 flats with 3 parking spaces in Hong Kong, 1 in Singapore, 1 in Australia, and 1 in Hangzhou. In August 2023, his total amount of property was deemed the most out of 21 government ministers.

In November 2022, Hui was tested positive for COVID-19.

Political offices
Preceded by James Lau	Secretary for Financial Services and the Treasury; 2020–present	Incumbent
Order of precedence
Previous: Erick Tsang; Member of the Executive Council	Hong Kong order of precedence Member of the Executive Council	Next: Chris Tang; Member of the Executive Council
