= Principal Officials Accountability System =

Hong Kong political system

- Traditional Chinese: 主要官員問責制
- Simplified Chinese: 主要官员问责制
Transcriptions
Standard Mandarin
- Hanyu Pinyin: Zhǔyào Guānyuán Wènzé Zhì
Yue: Cantonese
- Yale Romanization: Jyú yiu gūn yùhn mahn jaak jai
- Jyutping: Zyu2 yiu3 gun1 jun4 man6 zaak3 zai3

In Hong Kong, the Principal Officials Accountability System (主要官員問責制) was introduced by inaugural chief executive Tung Chee Hwa in July 2002. It is a system whereby all principal officials, including the Chief Secretary, Financial Secretary, Secretary for Justice and head of government bureaux would no longer be politically neutral career civil servants. Instead, they would all be political appointees chosen by the chief executive.

Under the new system, all heads of bureaux would become ministers, members of the Executive Council, a refashioned cabinet. They would report directly to the chief executive instead of the Chief Secretary or the Financial Secretary.

POAS was portrayed as the key to solving previous administrative problems, notably the lack of co-operation of high-ranking civil servants with the chief executive. The changes were introduced by Tung at the beginning of his second term, with the hope of resolving difficulties he faced in governance.

It was expanded and superseded by the Political Appointment System in 2008.

== Overview ==
=== Background ===
After the transfer of sovereignty, Hong Kong inherited the colonial system that all positions in the government were filled by civil servants. The historical bureaucracy was necessitated by the nature of colonial rule. Government policies and legislations were all dominated by the bureaucracy, led by the Governor, with the executive and legislative councils, all of whose members were appointed by the Governor. A web of advisory boards and committees, served to support and supplement policies, thereby giving the system some sense of elite participation and endorsement.

The Sino-British Joint Declaration and the Basic Law had assumed the continuity of a bureaucracy-led government to preserve continuity of the government machine. Under this system, only the Chief Secretary, Financial Secretary and Secretary for Justice were ex-officio members of the Executive Council (EXCO); Unofficial members were majority in the council. Thus principal officials during the last British administration stayed in their original portfolios. In effect, the first non-colonial administration was a coalition government with top bureaucrats headed by then Chief Secretary for Administration, Anson Chan.

=== The change rationale ===
Since the reversion to China, there has been an erosion of the running principles of the Executive Council (Exco) – some Exco members have violated the "collective responsibility" principles, namely being unsupportive to the decisions made by Exco. See this as the cause of many of his policy failures such as the "85,000 Housing Reform", Tung introduced POAS in 2002 to remedy the weaknesses as he perceived of the Hong Kong government.

The "short pile" scandal shows that the government and the chief executive fail to hold top civil servants, namely permanent secretary, accountable. Being the top of bureaucracy, permanent secretary no longer maintain political neutrality as they are bridging public and lower civil servants’ suggestions and giving advice to directors and executives; practically they are holding power for policy-making. Political neutrality is seen as an unwritten convention to promote impartiality within government and it is “the fundamental value for good governance” as bureaucrats are not elected, they are not meant to represent popular interest and do not capture the mandate to exert any kind of power. Yet, power is exercised and no mechanisms of accountability can hold them fully accountable as, firstly, the Legislative Council can hold answerability by inviting them into enquiry sessions, passing a motion for non-confidence does not entails dismissal nor disciplinary action as it is not stated in the Basic Law or any statute; secondly, they are not members of the Executive Council and not administratively accountable to the chief executive.

On 10 October 2001 Tung outlined an accountability system under which principal officials would serve no longer than the chief executive who appointed the official. Sixteen government bureaux would be consolidated into 11, and bureau heads not appointed as ministers would be retitled 'Permanent Secretaries. The principal officials would be the Chief Secretary, Financial Secretary, Secretary for Justice and Directors of the 11 Bureaux, who could be selected from within or outside the civil service. Under this system, the chief executive is able to appoint the Secretaries of department and the Directors of Bureau directly and they are withdrawn from the civil service and would be employed on contract. They would be appointed by the Central Government on the recommendation of the chief executive. To allay fears of the threat to civil service neutrality, the Secretary for Civil Service would be a civil servant.

After the introduction of the POAS, the chief executive would appoint all principal officials to Exco under the new accountability system, and Exco would become a small enough to be an effective decision-making body, a de facto 'cabinet', bearing collective responsibility for all policy decisions. Only a few full-time non-officials retained as "ministers-without-portfolio", thus aiming to achieve policy coherence and co-ordination within government.

The system is aimed at raising the accountability of the civil service, so the political appointees are responsible for all their job aspects and will step down if they make any failure. "Certainly, the officials should be responsible for the success and failure for the policies for which they are responsible," Tung said

== Implementation ==
Tung presented a framework for the system to Legco in April 2002. It was announced that the appointees would report directly to the chief executive. They would leave the civil service, and be employed on contract. The civil service would remain permanent, meritocratic and politically neutral. The highest-ranking civil servants would be re-titled "Permanent Secretaries", would work to their respective principal officials under the accountability system, and would not have to shoulder the public responsibility for the performance of the bureaux. Cash remuneration package for principal officials under the accountability system would be in the region of $3.74 million, $3.87 million, $4.01 million and $4.15 million per annum for Directors of Bureau, SJ, FS and CS respectively.

On 24 June 2002, Tung announced the composition of his new cabinet, to be in place for the start of his second five-year term on 1 July. Tung heralded this as the "dawning of a new era for the governance of Hong Kong... and more accountable to the people of Hong Kong." He added: "Ours will be an open, enlightened and progressive government."

Romanised name	Chinese name	age at appointment	Portfolio	Prior occupation
Donald Tsang Yam-kuen	曾蔭權	58	Chief Secretary for Administration (CS)	
Anthony Leung Kam-chung	梁錦松	50	Financial Secretary (FS)	
Elsie Leung Oi-see	梁愛詩	63	Secretary for Justice (SJ)	
Joseph Wong Wing-ping	王永平	54	Secretary for Civil Service	
Henry Tang Ying-yen	唐英年	50	Secretary for Commerce, Industry and Technology	Chairman, Federation of Hong Kong Industries
Stephen Lam Sui-lun	林瑞麟	50	Secretary for Constitutional Affairs	Information Coordinator, Office of the Chief Executive
Stephen Ip Shu-kwan	葉澍堃	50	Secretary for Economic Development and Labour	Secretary for Financial Services
Frederick Ma Si-hang	馬時亨	50	Secretary for Financial Services and the Treasury	chief financial officer, PCCW
Sarah Liao Sau-tung	廖秀冬	51	Secretary for the Environment, Transport and Works	MD of Greater China, CH2M Hill
Dr Patrick Ho Chi-ping	何志平	52	Secretary for Home Affairs	Chairman, Arts Development Council
Michael Suen Ming-yeung	孫明揚	58	Secretary for Housing, Planning and Lands	Secretary for Constitutional Affairs
Arthur Li Kwok-cheung	李國章	57	Secretary for Education and Manpower	Vice-Chancellor, Chinese University
Yeoh Eng-kiong	楊永強	56	Secretary for Health, Welfare and Food	Secretary for Health and Welfare
Regina Ip Lau Suk-yee	葉劉淑儀	52	Secretary for Security	

=== Concerns ===
The proposals raised concerns that Tung was moving the system towards one man rule. Dr Anthony Cheung, professor in public administration at the City University, suggested that it may be a silent political revolution in disguise. Professor DeGolyer of Baptist University echoed concerns that the proposals would severely weaken Hong Kong's system of checks and balances. He feared that as bureau heads would no longer report through the Chief Secretary and Financial Secretary, senior civil servants' career protections would be more vulnerable to the chief executive's pressure. The chief executive is required, by Article 56 of the Basic Law, to state for the record his reasons for rejecting a majority opinion of Exco members. The changes sought to Exco, previously dominated by civil servants, would remove one further constraint to the power of the chief executive. Furthermore, as Political secretaries would also have a say over who will become their permanent secretaries, a toadying culture among civil servants towards their political masters would be created.

=== Lack of public consultation ===
There were criticisms from political observers of a lack of public consultation, then the legislation was rushed through.

=== Political alliances ===
In preparation for the introduction of POAS, the Tung allied himself with the Democratic Alliance for the Betterment of Hong Kong (DAB) and the Liberal Party, resulting in a clear division of the political spectrum – the pro-government camp, and the anti-government camp led by the Democratic Party (DP).

As a result of the appointment of the heads of the Liberal Party and DAB to the Executive Council to form a "ruling alliance, the pro-democracy parties and individuals were marginalised.

== Criticisms and controversies ==
=== Public perception ===
The protection Tung offered to his beleaguered officials was one of the factors that led to the 1 July protest in which hundreds of thousands of Hong Kong people participated. Only after the protest did Tung reluctantly accepted the resignation of Regina Ip and Anthony Leung.

In 2004, academic think-tank headed by Anthony Cheung published a survey on POAS. Overall, many respondents felt "regression in the governance of the Tung administration, with no significant improvements being made in the past 12 months," Cheung said. Alex Chan, social science lecturer at Hong Kong Polytechnic University, said the survey results showed the accountability system remained a mystery to the public, particularly among the middle class and professionals. In the wake of the forced resignations of Yeoh, Ip and Leung due to public pressure, Tung said that the POAS history was very short, but vowed to strengthen the system.

In 2008, political commentator Frank Ching remarked: "six years after the system was introduced, we have yet to see a minister voluntarily resign to take political responsibility for anything."

==== Management of SARS, 2002/3 ====
Firstly, the former CE ordered the former Secretary of Health, Welfare and Food Yeoh Eng-kiong to "investigate himself" after SARS, as a way to hold the secretary accountable, yet, absurdly, the government's later report declared that no officials should step down for the outbreak of SARS. He resigned solely because of public pressure.

==== Penny stock delisting proposals, 2002 ====
Secondly, in July 2002, Hong Kong Exchanges and Clearing Ltd. made a proposal to cancel listings of companies trading below HK$0.50 for 30 straight days. On the day of its announcement, panic selling caused a loss of HK$10 billion in the local stock market. Seventeen companies' shares lost more than 30 per cent of their value, and about HK$6 billion in market capitalisation was wiped off 105 listed companies. While a government enquiry absolved the ministers, and put the blame on HKEx chief executive, legislators criticised the government for avoiding responsibility, and cast doubt on the effectiveness of the accountability system. Lee Cheuk-yan said: "[l]imited by the authority and terms of reference, the report did not make a detailed study of the accountability for the incident."

The Standard revealed that some government officials argued there was no need to apologise because the report did not single Ma out for criticism. Government legal experts had cautioned that such an apology would set a bad precedent and could spark litigation. Ma did apologise, under clamour of public pressure.

==== "Lexusgate" ====
Then Financial Secretary Anthony Leung came under severe criticism in March 2003 when it was revealed that he bought a HK$790,000 (US$101,282) Lexus LS 430 vehicle, just weeks before he raised the tax on new vehicles in his budget.

Leung denied that he was trying to avoid the new tax, which would have cost him an additional HK$50,000. Leung claimed that he had decided on the tax increase after buying the car. News of the car purchase sparked fury at Leung's conflict of interest, and concerns over his integrity for failing to declare his purchase to Exco. When it was revealed that James Tien, Stephen Lam and Yeoh Eng-kiong had also declared their purchases at the relevant meeting while Leung had not, Legislators were suspicious of a cover-up.

Tung Chee Hwa defended Leung's integrity, saying that although Leung had breached the Code of Conduct under the accountability system, but believed Leung did not intend to cover up. Tung did blame Leung for failing to tell him when or after he bought the new car, but added that "[w]hether or not he made a declaration at the Exco meeting was relatively unimportant." Leung tendered his resignation, which Tung refused to accept.

==== Harbour Fest, 2003 ====
The Hong Kong Harbour Fest, held from 17 October to 11 November 2003, was part of a HK$1 billion program to revive the economy after SARS. The event was a Government underwritten, and organised by InvestHK, under the auspices of the Economic Relaunch Working Group, in collaboration with the American Chamber of Commerce. The event and its organisation, which resulted in massive cost overruns and $100 million in government underwriting, was heavily criticised in the media.

According to Christine Loh, the changes to civil servants' responsibilities and accountability a result of political appointments did not stop Mike Rowse, a senior civil servant from being made a scapegoat of political failure in the case. Frank Ching pointed to the huge credibility gap of the government. He decried the attempt by Henry Tang to shift political responsibility from himself, as the relevant minister, to a senior civil servant, as a travesty of justice, and said it went against the Accountability System.

== Further development of political appointments ==
On 26 July 2006 the government released the Consultation Document on the Further Development of the Political Appointment System. Two new posts, deputy directors of Bureaus (DAB) and Assistants to Directors (AD) would be added to the political appointment layer. Each Director of Bureau would be assisted by the two new appointees and constitute the political team while the civil servants carry out the administrative and executive tasks of the Government. Like for the heads of Bureaux, these 2 new posts can also be drawn from within or outside the civil service, and appointees may be with or without political background.
