= Secretary for Economic Services =

The Secretary for Economic Services (Chinese: 經濟司 and later 經濟局局長) was a minister position in the Government of Hong Kong, which is responsible for economic development in Hong Kong. The position was renamed to the Secretary for Economic Development and Labour (Chinese: 經濟發展及勞工局) after nearly thirty years. The new position headed the Economic Development and Labour Bureau and was created together with the introduction of Principal Officials Accountability System on 1 July 2002, by merging the positions with the labour portfolio of Secretary for Education and Manpower. After POAS was introduced all secretaries are members of the Executive Council.

The position was abolished in 2007 when the Economic Development and Labour Bureau was abolished and its functions transferred to the Commerce and Economic Development Bureau, the Transport and Housing Bureau, and the Labour and Welfare Bureau.

== List of office holders ==
=== Secretaries for Economic Services, 1973–1997 ===
No.	Portrait	Name	Term of office		Governor	Ref
1		Derek Jones 鍾信	November 1973	September 1976	Sir Murray MacLehose (1971–1982)	
2		David Jeaffreson 謝法新	September 1976	September 1982	Sir Murray MacLehose (1971–1982)	
2		David Jeaffreson 謝法新	September 1976	September 1982	Sir Edward Youde (1982–1986)	
3		Piers Jacobs 翟克誠	September 1982	12 January 1986	Sir Edward Youde (1982–1986)	
4		John Francis Yaxley 易誠禮	27 January 1986	8 March 1987	Sir Edward Youde (1982–1986)	
5		Anson Chan 陳方安生	23 March 1987	April 1993	Sir David Wilson (1987–1992)	
5		Anson Chan 陳方安生	23 March 1987	April 1993	Chris Patten (1992–1997)	
6		Gordon Siu 蕭炯柱	1993	1996	Chris Patten (1992–1997)	
7		Stephen Ip 葉澍堃	June 1996	30 June 1997	Chris Patten (1992–1997)	

=== Secretaries for Economic Services, 1997–2002 ===
No.	Portrait	Name	Term of office		Duration	Chief Executive	Term	Ref
1		Stephen Ip Shu-kwan 葉澍堃	1 July 1997	30 June 2000	2 years, 365 days	Tung Chee-hwa (1997–2005)	1	
2		Sandra Birch Lee Suk-yee 李淑儀	1 July 2000	30 June 2002	1 year, 364 days	Tung Chee-hwa (1997–2005)	1	

=== Secretaries for Economic Development and Labour, 2002–2007 ===
No.	Portrait	Name	Term of office		Duration	Chief Executive	Term	Ref
1		Stephen Ip Shu-kwan 葉澍堃	1 July 2002	30 June 2007	4 years, 364 days	Tung Chee-hwa (1997–2005)	2	
1		Stephen Ip Shu-kwan 葉澍堃	1 July 2002	30 June 2007	4 years, 364 days	Donald Tsang (2005–2012)	2	

Economic and labour affairs were handled by, respectively, Secretary for Commerce and Economic Development and Secretary for Labour and Welfare after 2007.
