= Joseph Chan Ho-lim =

Hong Kong politician

Under Secretary for Financial Services and the Treasury
- Incumbent
- Assumed office 16 August 2017
- Preceded by: James Lau

Personal details
- Born: 9 February 1977 (age 49)
- Spouse: Married
- Children: 2 daughters
- Occupation: Hong Kong Central and Western District Council Member (Peak Constituency) (2012–2019)

Chinese name
- Traditional Chinese: 陳浩濂
- Simplified Chinese: 陈浩濂
- Yale Romanization: Chàhn Houh-lìhm

Joseph Chan Ho-lim (Chinese: 陳浩濂) is Under Secretary for Financial Services and the Treasury, and a former member of the Central and Western District Council (Peak Constituency).

== Education, qualifications and work experience ==
After finishing secondary school at Wah Yan College, Hong Kong, Chan went to the University of Michigan studying economics (honors) and psychology double degree. He is also a Chartered Financial Analyst (CFA) Chartered Holder.

After graduation he started his career in the financial sector at Merrill Lynch (Asia Pacific), where he was promoted to vice president in just five years. In 2005 at the age of 28, Joseph became a managing director at Bear Stearns Asia. He was then the industry's youngest investment banker with such corporate title. In 2008 he joined Standard Chartered Bank as managing director of Financial Markets and subsequently in 2016 he joined Credit Agricole Corporate & Investment Bank as managing director of Global Markets Division.

Chan joined the Liberal Party in 2009, and was first elected as a District Council member in 2011. By a large margin of 1505–820, he defeated Civic Party Tanya Chan (member of both District Council and Legislative Council) in the Peak Constituency. With the reputation of hardworking and devoted service to residents, Chan was re-elected in 2015 with a landslide victory of 1837–317. He got the highest percentage of votes in the Hong Kong Island area of the District Council.

== Controversies ==
On 5 January 2022, Carrie Lam announced new warnings and restrictions against social gathering due to potential COVID-19 outbreaks. One day later, it was discovered that Chan attended a birthday party hosted by Witman Hung Wai-man, with 222 guests. At least one guest tested positive with COVID-19, causing all guests to be quarantined.

== Political positions ==
- Liberal Party: Member, Central Committee
- Liberal Party: Convener, Economy Panel

== District Council services ==
- Central and Western District Council: Elected Member (Peak Constituency)
- Central and Western District Council: Vice Chairman, Traffic & Transport Committee
- Central and Western District Council: Chairman, Working Group on Environmental Improvement, Greening and Beautification Works in C&W District
- Central & Western Mid-Levels Owners Association: Honorary Advisor
- Central and Western District Fight Crime Committee: Member
- Central and Mid-Levels Area Committee: Member

== Public services ==
- Trade and Industry Department (TID): Member, Small & Medium Enterprise Committee
- The Hong Kong General Chamber of Commerce (HKGCC): Vice President, Young Executives Club; Member, Environment & Sustainability Committee; Co-opted Member, Small & Medium Enterprises Committee
- The Hong Kong Society of Financial Analysts (HKSFA): Vice President; Board of Directors; chairman, Continuing Education Committee
- Hong Kong Securities and Investment Institute(HKSI): Board of Directors; chairman, Membership Committee
- The Chinese Gold & Silver Exchange Society (CGSE): Advisor; Member, Registration Committee
- Hong Kong Arts Centre(HKAC): Board of Governors
- Environment and Conservation Fund:Member, Investment Committee; Member, Waste Reduction Projects Vetting Subcommittee
- Scout Association of Hong Kong: Member, Finance Committee; Vice Chairman, Kowloon Regions; chairman, Kowloon Regions Estate Committee; Vice Chairman Hong Kong Island Regions Finance and Raising Group Committee
- The University of Hong Kong(HKU): Instructor, School of Economics and Finance Mentorship Programme
- Wah Yan (Hong Kong ) Past Students Association: Convener, Finance Fraternity

Political offices
Preceded by Tanya Chan	Member of Central and Western District Council; Representative for Peak; 2012–2017	Succeeded by Jeremy Young Chit-on
Preceded by James Lau	Under Secretary for Financial Services and the Treasury; 2017–present	Incumbent
