= KC Chan =

Hong Kong politician and economist

Professor Chan Ka Keung Ceajer "KC" GBS SBS JP
- 陳家強

Secretary for Financial Services and the Treasury
- In office 1 July 2007 – 30 June 2017
- Chief Executive: Donald Tsang; Leung Chun-ying
- Preceded by: Frederick Ma
- Succeeded by: James Lau

Dean of Business and Management, HKUST
- In office 2002–2007
- Preceded by: Chan Yuk-shee
- Succeeded by: Leonard Cheng

Personal details
- Born: 10 February 1957 (age 69)
- Education: King's College, Hong Kong; Wesleyan University; University of Chicago

KC Chan
- Traditional Chinese: 陳家強
- Simplified Chinese: 陈家强
Transcriptions
Standard Mandarin
- Hanyu Pinyin: Chén Jiāqiáng
Yue: Cantonese
- Yale Romanization: Chàhn Gākèuhng

Chan Ka Keung Ceajer GBS SBS JP (Chinese: 陳家強, born 10 February 1957), mainly referred to as KC Chan, is a Hong Kong politician and economist who served as the Secretary for Financial Services and the Treasury. He is the ex officio chairman of the Kowloon-Canton Railway Corporation, and an ex officio member of the Hong Kong International Theme Parks board of directors. Chan left the government and rejoined the Hong Kong University of Science and Technology in 2017. He is currently the chairman of WeLab Bank, a digital bank in Hong Kong.

== Education ==
Chan holds a bachelor's degree in economics from Wesleyan University, followed by an MBA and a PhD in finance from the University of Chicago.

== Career ==
Chan taught for nine years at Max M. Fisher College of Business in Ohio State University. In 1993 he was named Dean of Business/Management and Professor of Finance at the Hong Kong University of Science and Technology.

Before joining the government, Chan held public service positions including chairman of the Consumer Council and director of the Hong Kong Futures Exchange. He served as a member of the Exchange Fund Advisory Committee.

Chan became Secretary for Financial Services and the Treasury on 1 July 2007.

During his tenure as Secretary for Financial Services and the Treasury, Chan dealt with several policy and economic issues, including:

2008 financial crisis: During the 2008 financial crisis, Chan was involved in policy responses aimed at maintaining financial stability and investor confidence in Hong Kong.

Regulatory Reforms: During Chan's tenure, Hong Kong worked on financial regulatory reforms including the implementation of Basel III banking standards and the development of regulatory framework for over-the-counter derivatives.

Development of Offshore Renminbi Market: During Chan's Tenure, Hong Kong developed its offshore renminbi market, including infrastructure and regulatory measures to support RMB transactions.

Integration with Mainland China: Chan was involved in policies related to Hong Kong's financial integration with mainland China while maintaining Hong Kong's separate regulatory framework including the Shanghai-Hong Kong Stock Connect.

Technological Advancements: During Chan's tenure, Hong Kong introduced policies related to financial technology, cybersecurity, and investor protection in the financial sector.

== List of publications ==
- Chan, K.C., Karolyi, G.A. & Stulz, R.M., "Global financial markets and the risk premium on U.S. equity", Journal of Financial Economics 32 (2), 1992, pp. 137–167
- Chan, K.C., Chen, N. & Hsieh, D.A., "An exploratory investigation of the firm size effect", Journal of Financial Economics 14 (3), 1985, pp. 451–47

Academic offices
Preceded by Chan Yuk-shee	Dean of Business and Management, HKUST; 2002–2007	Succeeded by Leonard Cheng
Political offices
Preceded by Andrew Chan	Chairman of Hong Kong Consumer Council; 2005–2007	Succeeded by Anthony Cheung
Preceded by Frederick Ma	Secretary for Financial Services and the Treasury; 2007–2017	Succeeded by James Lau
