= Financial Services and the Treasury Bureau =

Bureau of the Hong Kong Government

- 財經事務及庫務局
- Emblem of the Hong Kong SAR

Bureau overview
- Formed: 1 July 2002
- Jurisdiction: Hong Kong Government
- Headquarters: 24/F, Central Government Offices, 2 Tim Mei Avenue, Tamar, Hong Kong
- Minister responsible: Christopher Hui, Secretary for Financial Services and the Treasury
- Deputy Minister responsible: Joseph Chan, Under Secretary for Financial Services and the Treasury
- Bureau executives: Salina Yan, Permanent Secretary for Financial Services and the Treasury (Financial Services); Andrew Lai, Permanent Secretary for Financial Services and the Treasury (Treasury)
- Parent Bureau: Financial Secretary
- Child agencies: Census and Statistics Department; Companies Registry (Hong Kong); Government Logistics Department; Government Property Agency; Inland Revenue Department; Official Receiver's Office; Rating and Valuation Department; Treasury
- Website: fstb.gov.hk

Financial Services and the Treasury Bureau
- Traditional Chinese: 財經事務及庫務局
Transcriptions
Yue: Cantonese
- Yale Romanization: Chòih gīng sih mouh kahp fu mouh guhk
- Jyutping: Coi^{2} ging^{1} si^{6} mou^{6} kap^{6} fu^{3} mou^{6} guk^{6}

The Financial Services and the Treasury Bureau (FSTB) is a part of the 15 policy bureaux for the Hong Kong Special Administrative Region. They are responsible for developing and executing government policy on finance and treasury. The agency was established on 1 July 2002. The current (since 1 July 2017) Secretary for Financial Services and the Treasury is Christopher Hui and the under secretary is Joseph Chan.

== History ==
Financial Services Bureau was established on 1 July 1997. The previous form is Financial Services Branch under colonial Hong Kong, headed by the Secretary for Financial Services.

Finance Bureau was established on 1 July 1997. The previous form is Finance Branch under colonial Hong Kong, headed by the Secretary for the Treasury.

Financial Services Bureau and Finance Bureau were merged to become Financial Services and the Treasury Bureau on 1 July 2002, headed by the Secretary for Financial Services and the Treasury. A Financial Services Branch and a Treasury Branch were created within the Bureau, each headed by a permanent secretary of D8 rank on the Directorate Pay Scale.

In March 2021, the FSTB announced proposed changes to the Companies Registry, where information on companies would begin to be hidden. In response, David Webb said that such changes "will facilitate corruption, fraud and other crimes." The New York Times also said that those changes could potentially benefit Chinese Communist Party officials, as families of top officials had bought property in Hong Kong using companies.

In December 2022, the FSTB announced that it would seek to regulate crowdfunding in Hong Kong, suggesting that all campaigns file an application before launching.

=== Official Receiver's Office ===
Official Receiver's Office (ORO, Chinese: 破產管理署) is a government department within the bureau. They are responsible for statutory functions relating to insolvency, by being the role of liquidator and trustee of last resort in the administration of both corporate and personal insolvency cases respectively.

The Office was established on 1 June 1992, taking over the powers and perform the duties of the Insolvency Division of the then Registrar General's Department. According to Bankruptcy Ordinance (Cap. 6), once the court make a bankruptcy order, the Official Receiver will become the provisional trustee of the property of the bankrupt, and become the liquidator under the Companies (Winding Up and Miscellaneous Provisions) Ordinance (Cap. 32) to conduct personal or company compulsory liquidations.

== Past Secretaries ==
- Treasury affairs
  - Deputy Financial Secretary (1945–1989)
  - Secretary for the Treasury (1997–2002)
  - Treasury affairs were handled by the Secretary for Financial Services and the Treasury since 2002
- Financial services affairs
  - Secretary for Monetary Affairs (1976–1993)
  - Secretary for Financial Services (1993–2002)
  - Secretary for Financial Services and the Treasury (2002–present)
