= Hong Kong Futures Exchange =

Futures exchange in Hong Kong

- Type: Futures exchange
- Location: Central, Hong Kong
- Owner: Hong Kong Exchanges and Clearing

Hong Kong Futures Exchange (HKFE) is a futures exchange in Hong Kong. Established in 1976, it offered a variety of options and futures contracts, linked to stock market indices, stocks, short-term interest rates, and foreign exchange. HKFE is a subsidiary of Hong Kong Exchanges and Clearing Limited.

== History ==
The HKFE went bankrupt in 1987 during the October 1987 global stock market crash when Sino Group chairman Robert Ng, who had been speculating in futures through two Panamanian-registered companies, suffered paper losses of HK$1 billion, but then refused to pay, claiming to be protected by the limited liability of the companies through which he had traded. Trading was also halted on the Hong Kong Stock Exchange for four days. An investigation by the Commercial Crime Bureau of the Royal Hong Kong Police revealed that Ng had avoided required margin calls through collusion with one of his brokers. However, in the end, no charges were laid against Ng because the colonial government of Hong Kong felt that prosecuting him would pose a risk to overall market stability. Instead, a deal was worked out which saw Ng repay HK$500 million, with Hong Kong taxpayers providing the rest of the funds needed by the Exchange through a government bailout.

On 6 March 2000, a new parent company Hong Kong Exchanges and Clearing for the HKFE, the Stock Exchange of Hong Kong Limited, and Hong Kong Securities Clearing was formed.

== See also ==
- List of futures exchanges
