= 2020 Hong Kong cabinet reshuffle =

First cabinet reshuffle in Hong Kong since the start of 2019 democracy movement

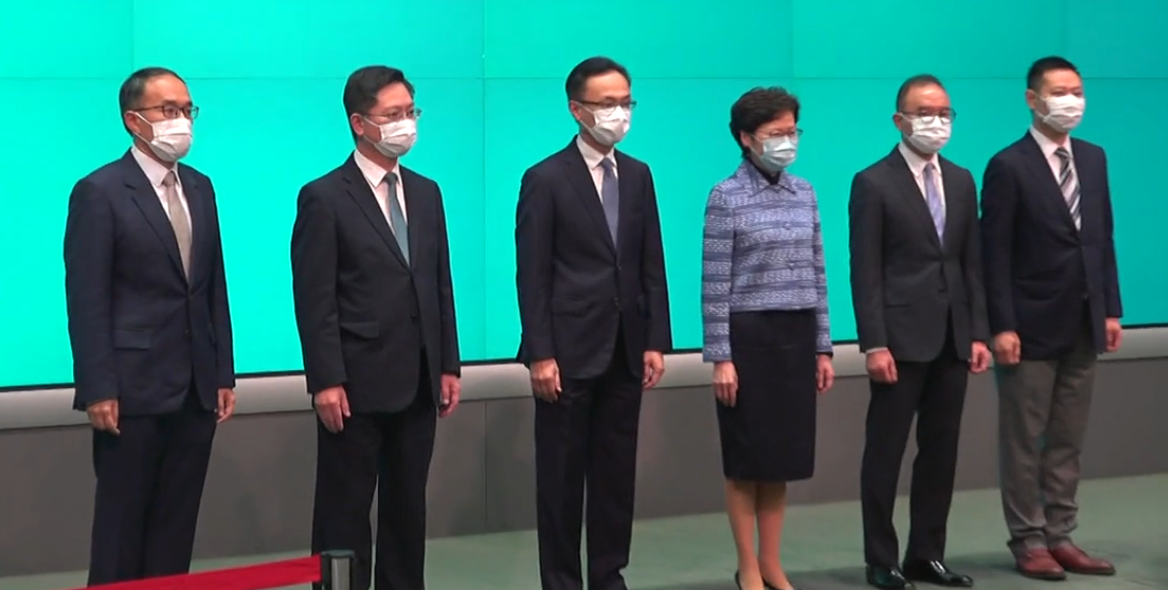
Chief Executive Carrie Lam and new ministers in press conference after reshuffle

The Hong Kong Executive Council was reshuffled from 21 to 22 April 2020. The reshuffle is the largest since the handover of Hong Kong in 1997, and the first after the unprecedented large-scale anti-government protests erupted.

== Background ==
Since Carrie Lam assumed office as Chief Executive of Hong Kong Special Administrative Region on 1 July 2017, her approval rating has been dropping and broke the record low. The extradition bill announced in March 2019 prompted massive anger in the city, and triggered the largest protest in the city, demanding to withdraw the bill. Local reports said the pro-government leftists suggested the sacking of officials, including Teresa Cheng, the Secretary for Justice, to calm the protestors. Financial Times, cited sources, claimed Carrie Lam offered to resign for various times but were rejected by the Chinese Government. In a secret recording obtained by Reuters, Carrie Lam said she would quit if she could. All these reports were denied by Lam.

Before the significant reshuffle, Carrie Lam's administration saw three departures, including retirement of Director of Audit David Sun and Commissioner of Police Stephen Lo, while Secretary for Justice Rimsky Yuen resigned for personal reasons in 2018. Following the outbreak of protests, Carrie Lam was rumoured to consider reshuffling the government, which she did not rule out. Law Chi-kwong, Secretary for Labour and Welfare, said he once mulled resignation. But without any sacking or removal of officials, the accountability system is criticised to have vanished, which Lam called on the society for "giving them opportunities" as a response.

On 21 April 2020, several local media outlets, citing unnamed sources, reported the cabinet would soon be shuffled. Erick Tsang, Director of Immigration, was first named to reportedly succeed Patrick Nip as the new Secretary for Constitutional and Mainland Affairs. Sources initially suggested Nip could be sacked to "bear political responsibility", but reports later said he would remain in cabinet. Other ministerial changes were reported by the press later that day. The reshuffle was officially announced by the Hong Kong Government on the next day after the State Council of China confirmed the new appointments. New cabinet ministers and Carrie Lam met the press in the afternoon.

== Cabinet-level changes ==
Non-principal officials are italicised.

Colour key
- Joined the cabinet
- Left the cabinet

Minister	Party	Before reshuffle	After reshuffle
Caspar Tsui Ying-wai	DAB	Under Secretary for Labour and Welfare	Secretary for Home Affairs
Erick Tsang Kwok-wai IDSM	Nonpartisan	Director of Immigration	Secretary for Constitutional and Mainland Affairs
Christopher Hui Ching-yu	DAB	Executive director of Financial Services Development Council	Secretary for Financial Services and the Treasury
Alfred Sit Wing-hang JP	Nonpartisan	Director of Electrical and Mechanical Services	Secretary for Innovation and Technology
Hon Patrick Nip Tak-kuen JP	Nonpartisan	Secretary for Constitutional and Mainland Affairs	Secretary for the Civil Service
Hon Joshua Law Chi-kong GBS JP	Nonpartisan	Secretary for the Civil Service	Left the government
Hon Lau Kong-wah JP	DAB	Secretary for Home Affairs	Left the government
Hon James Henry Lau Jr. GBS JP	Nonpartisan	Secretary for Financial Services and the Treasury	Left the government
Hon Nicholas Yang Wei-hsiung GBS JP	Nonpartisan	Secretary for Innovation and Technology	Left the government

== Other changes ==
Official	Party	Before reshuffle	After reshuffle	Effective from
Pauline Yeung	Nonpartisan	Political Assistant to the Secretary for Financial Services and the Treasury	Left the government	26 May 2020
Julian Ip Chun-lim	DAB	None	Political Assistant to the Secretary for Financial Services and the Treasury	1 June 2020
Ho Kai-ming	FTU	Member of Legislative Council	Under Secretary for Labour and Welfare	1 June 2020
Au Ka-wang	Nonpartisan	Deputy Director of Immigration	Director of Immigration	2 July 2020

Deputy Director of Electrical and Mechanical Services Pang Yiu-hung was promoted to Director following the predecessor's promotion to cabinet on 4 November 2020, along with two more senior appointments announced on the same day. The Financial Services Development Council announced Au King-lun, CEO of Value Partners Group Limited, succeeded Christopher Hui as the new executive director on 4 August 2020.

== Reasons for reshuffle ==
=== Constitutional Secretary ===
Electoral Affairs Commission, under the administration of Constitutional and Mainland Affairs Bureau, was criticised by the pro-Beijing camp after the commission decided not to postpone the 2018 Legislative Council by-election despite time-clashing with the "Two Sessions", the annual plenary sessions of Chinese Parliament and the Chinese People's Political Consultative Conference which many Beijing loyalists were expected to attend. They were said to be furious with Patrick Nip.

After the 2019 local elections, which the democrats won in landslide due to the protest movement, pro-Beijing camp was angered by Patrick Nip for his inaction against the "unfair" situations during the voting claimed by the camp. Nip was rumoured to be snitched since then.

In April 2020, Hong Kong and Macau Affairs Office and Hong Kong Liaison Office of the Chinese Government condemned the filibuster tactics by the pro-democracy camp to delay the passing of controversial National Anthem Bill. The threats against the MPs were deemed overseeing local legislative affairs, and were questioned for violating Article 22 of the Basic Law, which stipulated "[no] department of the Central People's Government [...] may interfere in the affairs which the Hong Kong Special Administrative Region administers on its own in accordance with this Law." Nip, in 2018, had also confirmed the Liaison Office will abide by the law. Following the controversy, the spokesman of the Government initially said in a statement that the Liaison Office is established in accordance with the Article 22, but the statement was amended for twice and eventually said the Office was not established under Article 22. The constitutional saga emerged was said to have given a "damaging reputation", and Nip, who apologised for the chaos, had to take the blame for making the "grave mistake".

Despite all these scandals, Nip was not sacked in the reshuffle, likely because being favoured by Carrie Lam, but was still practically demoted to the less-important Civil Service Secretary. Carrie Lam insisted the reshuffle was not related to the Article 22 chaos.

=== Civil Service Secretary ===
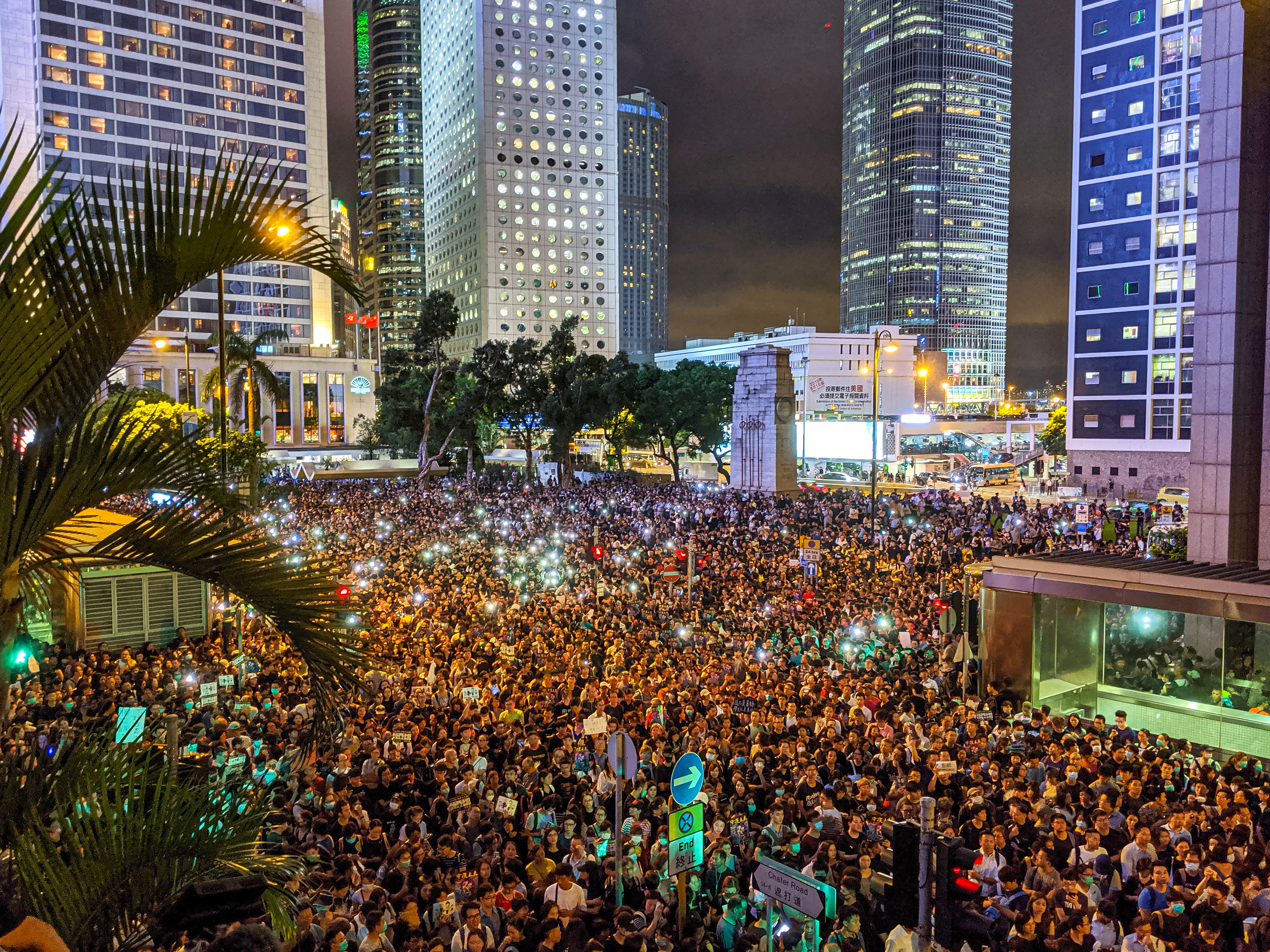
Protest by civil servants urging the withdrawal of the bill on 2 August 2019

Tens of thousand civil servants turned out in the historic first anti-government rally on 2 August 2019, which was rejected by the Government, saying "civil servants shall serve the Chief Executive and the Government of the day with total loyalty". Reports claimed the Chinese Government questioned the stance of Joshua Law, the Secretary for the Civil Service, and believed he is no longer suitable to stay, after he failed to express strong opposition and stop the rally, even Michael Ngan, organiser of the protest, was promoted.

=== Home Secretary ===
The dramatic lost by the pro-Beijing candidates in the local election was said to be one of the reasons Lau Kong-wah, the Secretary for Home Affairs, was removed, as his commanding bureau controlled local resources critical for election campaigning.

== Reactions and aftermath ==
Carrie Lam thanked the contribution by the departing officials, describing the reshuffle as "to look forward", adding that the main concerns were to lead Hong Kong out from the struggling economy, instead of exerting more control on the civil service or the Hong Kong–China relations. Lam expressed her admiration to the new ministers for joining the cabinet in a very uneasy period.

The leaving ministers released statements on the same day. Joshua Law thanked the civil servants for safeguarding the core values of the service, without any mentions on the Chief Executive. Lau Kong-wah said it is the appropriate time to say goodbye after five years in office, and was confident that his successor, also a party member of the DAB, will be competent for the post. Nicholas Yeung said he respected the decision by the Chief Executive and is willing to leave his post, having no regret for joining the cabinet. James Lau described his departure at the age of 70 is a memorable milestone.

According to the opinion poll conducted by Hong Kong Public Opinion Research Institute in April, the four secretaries with the lowest approval rating were Justice Secretary Teresa Cheng, Security Secretary John Lee, Education Secretary Kevin Yeung, and Chief Secretary Matthew Cheung. None of those were sacked, implying the reshuffle was unrelated to the popularity of the government, which is expected not to bounce following the reshuffle. The first opinion poll after the reshuffle also showed the new secretaries were having negative net approval rate. Analysts said the best opportunity for changing the ministers had already passed, and the whole cabinet was shadowed by the negative impression towards the political system.

New Home Secretary Caspar Tsui is the first promoted from political assistant to secretary after the new administrative system was implemented. DAB remained the largest ruling party in the Executive Council after two entered cabinet and one sacked. Some media labelled the reshuffle as "de-Leungisation", as most of those sacked first assumed office in the cabinet of former Chief Executive Leung Chun-ying.

Patrick Nip became the first non-civil servant leading the service, which some argued breaching the accountability system. Despite Nip stressed the new appointment is in line with the intent of the system, critics worried of the hidden political agenda. Erick Tsang was also the first retired member of the force to head the Constitutional Bureau, instead of appointing administrative officer as in usual practice. Tsang even showed the portrait of Xi Jinping, General Secretary of the Chinese Communist Party, in his office, and was therefore treated as the "follower" of Xi, and one of the potential candidates to become new Chief Secretary. Bloomberg reported the two bureaux are at the center of Beijing's demands for greater political loyalty. Wu Chi-wai, chairman of Democratic Party, said the new officials are with disciplinary force background, gradually replacing those from the civil service. Wu predicted the authorities would suppress dissidents harsher, and the National Security Law could be implemented at anytime.

A month after the reshuffle, Chinese Government announced the Hong Kong National Security Law would be enacted. Meanwhile, Nip announced new requirements for civil servants to pledge allegiance to the Basic Law, and Tsang warned pro-democracy camp for breaching the National Security Law. The Government was reshuffled in 2021 again, with John Lee, a former police, succeeded Matthew Cheung as the new Chief Secretary.
