= Caspar Tsui =

Hong Kong politician (born 1977)

The Honourable Caspar Tsui
- 徐英偉
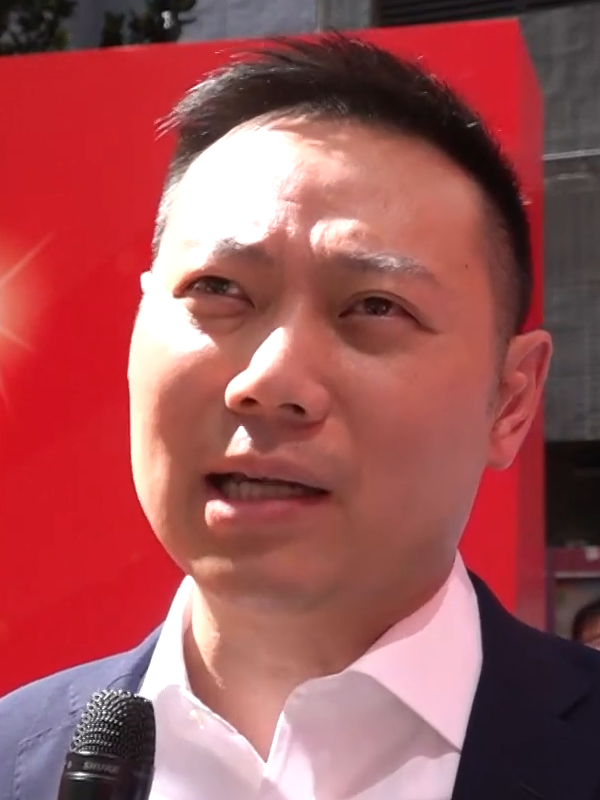
- Tsui in 2020.

Secretary for Home Affairs
- In office 22 April 2020 – 24 February 2022
- Chief Executive: Carrie Lam
- Preceded by: Lau Kong-wah
- Succeeded by: Alice Mak (as Secretary for Home and Youth Affairs)

Under Secretary for Labour and Welfare
- In office 2 August 2017 – 22 April 2020
- Secretary: Law Chi-kwong
- Preceded by: Stephen Sui
- Succeeded by: Ho Kai-ming

Political Assistant to the Secretary for Home Affairs
- In office June 2008 – 2 August 2017
- Secretary: Tsang Tak-sing; Lau Kong-wah
- Succeeded by: Jade Lai Wing-yu

Personal details
- Born: September 2, 1977 (age 49) British Hong Kong
- Party: DAB
- Education: University of Ottawa (BSocSc); University of Manchester (MBA)

Caspar Tsui Ying-wai (Chinese: 徐英偉; born 2 September 1977) is a Hong Kong politician, government official and DAB party member. From 2020 to 2022, he has been Secretary for Home Affairs.

Tsui used to be a columnist for the opinion section of Ming Pao. In February 2023, he participated in a TV program "Table For Three And More" as a guest host. From April 3, 2023, Tsui serves as the Secretariat - Executive Director of The Federation of Hong Kong Hotel Owners Limited.

On June 23, 2023, Tsui was elected as Non-Club-Linked Director of The Football Association of Hong Kong China, and his term of office will end in 2027.

== Early life ==
Tsui graduated in social sciences from the University of Ottawa and holds a Master of Business Administration degree from the University of Manchester. He worked at several banks including HSBC in Canada, Bank of Montreal, Merrill Lynch and American Express Bank before becoming an investment services manager at Hang Seng Bank. He stepped into politics in 2006 when he joined the Democratic Alliance for the Betterment and Progress of Hong Kong (DAB), the largest pro-Beijing party in Hong Kong. He was the vice-chairman of its youth branch, the Young DAB, from 2007 to 2008.

== Political career ==
He joined the government in the appointed role of Political Assistant to the Secretary for Home Affairs in 2008, after he renounced his Canadian citizenship that year.

In 2017 he became Under Secretary for Labour and Welfare. It was reported that on one occasion that year Tsui appeared unable to specify the Hong Kong minimum wage when a journalist asked him, and he had to pass the question to the Secretary, Law Chi-kwong.

In April 2020, he was appointed Secretary for Home Affairs, while remaining a member of the DAB, succeeding Lau Kong-wah. Tsui, aged 43 when appointed, was the youngest cabinet minister; and also the first political assistant eventually promoted to cabinet since the system was installed.

An unnamed "government insider" spoken to by the South China Morning Post described Tsui as a "diligent" contributor to Carrie Lam's "ambitious" governmental reforms, notably regarding sports-related and cultural policies.

In 2020, Tsui was criticised by, among others, LegCo member Alice Mak for posting an article on the Internet of himself eating sweet soup during a fatal fire in Yau Ma Tei, and responding to critics that there was "no conflict in multitasking".

In December 2020, Tsui said that freedom of speech for Hong Kong citizens is not "absolute," and that "[the] exercise by anyone of the right to freedom of expression carries with it special duties and responsibilities, and may therefore be subject to certain restrictions as provided by law as necessary for respect of the rights or reputations of others, or the protection of national security or of public order, or of public health or morals."

In April 2021, Tsui briefed the sports and culture industries on why the NPCSC implemented rules to only allow "patriots" to serve in the government, and asked for their full support.

In that year, new oath-taking requirements were implemented for Hong Kong District Council members. Tsui observed councillors' first ceremony taking the new oaths. Tsui was accused by members of the opposition bloc of using "scare tactics" to persuade as many as 200 or more opposition councillors to leave their positions prematurely, before these requirements were implemented, rather than risk potential disqualification by being judged unable to meet the new requirements. (By October 8 that year, the new requirements had resulted in 33 such disqualifications.) The South China Morning Post reported that many such premature resignations were encouraged by rumours spread in the media by "unspecified government sources" that disqualified councillors would have to return their entire salaries and operating expense payments since taking office. The Post quoted "multiple government sources" as having said Tsui and his aides did not clarify the truth or falsity of such rumours or specify how much money, if any, would have to be reimbursed upon disqualification, despite knowing the legal rationale for such reimbursements was "weak".

== Birthday party controversy ==
On 5 January 2022, Chief Executive Carrie Lam announced new warnings and restrictions against social gathering due to potential COVID-19 outbreaks. One day later, it was discovered that Tsui attended a birthday party hosted by Witman Hung, with 222 guests. At least one guest tested positive with COVID-19, causing all guests to be quarantined.

On 25 January 2022, South China Morning Post reported that Chief Executive Carrie Lam wanted to fire Tsui from his post over the party scandal, but Lam encountered resistance from pro-establishment figures, including Tsui's party, the Democratic Alliance for the Betterment and Progress of Hong Kong (DAB). Both Ip Kwok-Him and Tam Yiu-chung were among those who had defended Tsui.

On 31 January 2022, Casper Tsui tendered his resignation to the Chief Executive. It was revealed that Tsui attended the party just hours after having had a meeting with core officials on tightening social-distancing rules. Carrie Lam confirmed Tsui did not use the mandatory "LeaveHomeSafe" app when entering the restaurant. The resignation was approved by the Chinese Government on 24 February.

== Personal life ==
Tsui is married. Together with his wife, he owns one unit at Parc Oasis in Kowloon Tong, after having sold another unit and two parking spots for a profit of HK$6.475 million around the end of 2021.

Political offices
New title	Political Assistant to the Secretary for Home Affairs; 2008–2017	Succeeded by Jade Lai Wing-yu
Preceded by Stephen Sui	Under Secretary for Labour and Welfare; 2017–2020	Succeeded by Ho Kai-ming
Preceded by Lau Kong-wah	Secretary for Home Affairs; 2020–2022	Succeeded by Alice Mak
