= Residential care homes in Hong Kong =

In Hong Kong, assisted-living facilities, referred to by the government as residential care homes, are available for those 65 or over (or starting at the age of 60, if a need is proven).

== Overview ==
The territory's Social Welfare Department administers a licensing regime to regulate residential care homes, under the Residential Care Homes (Elderly Persons) Ordinance, which was enacted in 1995. According to the SWD, the territory's residential care services for elders have, among other purposes and objectives, an aim to provide residential care and facilities to those who are not able to live at home, due to person, social, health, or other reasons.

== History ==
The provision of residential care services began in the early 1960s. Religious organizations established retirement homes, providing limited residential care services philanthropically. Non-profit organizations also began to offer similar services in the end of the decade. Believing that taking care of the elderly is the responsibility of each family, the government initially only provided financial support to the elderly.

In 1972, the government set up a committee to find out the elderly needs in Hong Kong. The report released by the committee helped foster the later development of the residential care homes for the elderly. Among all the suggestions by the committee, the concept of "community support" is still being adopted nowadays.

Lacking government subsidized residential facilities for the elderly, numerous private residential facilities were established during the mid-1980s, but the quality of these private facilities was often unsatisfactory. In 1994, the Legislative Council of Hong Kong passed the Residential Care Homes (Elderly Persons) Ordinance. All residential care facilities (except nursing home, which is monitored by the Hospitals, Nursing Homes, and Maternity Homes Registration Ordinance) must be licensed to legitimate their operation under the ordinance. The ordinance was officially implemented in 1996, and the licensing office of the Social Welfare Department was responsible for its enactment.

To further solve the problem of insufficient subsidized residential facilities, the government initiated Bought Place Scheme in 1989 and Enhanced Bought Place Scheme in 1999 to purchase places in private residential facilities.

During the 1990s, the government conducted another research on the needs of the elderly. The research report concluded that residential care services should primarily be provided to those with more disabilities and that the government should, therefore, set up stricter rules for enrollment and transform all Homes for the Aged to Care and Attention Homes for the Elderly and Nursing Homes. Since then, the focus of residential care services has been to predominantly take care of those with moderate or severe level of disabilities.

In 2001, the government introduced competitive bidding as the new mode of selecting operators in delivering care services in her residential facilities (i.e., contract homes) to enhance the efficiency of her residential care services and reduce the operational costs in these facilities.

With the "ageing in place" as the government's guiding principle in providing residential care services, the government now predominantly focuses on developing Care and Attention Homes for the Elderly and Nursing Homes. From 2003 and onwards, the government no longer accepts new applications to Hostel for the Elderly and Home for the Aged. In later years, the government also gradually transformed these two types of residential facilities and those that are not providing long-term nursing support to places that deliver continuum support and intensive nursing care.

== Current situation in Hong Kong ==
=== Types ===
There are several types of residential care homes for elderly persons in Hong Kong.

Types	Service provided	Target elders characteristics
Hostel for the Elderly	Communal living accommodation, programme activities, 24hour staff support	Capable of self-care
Home for the Aged	Residential care, meals, limited degree of assistance in daily activities	Unable to live independently in community; Not yet dependent on assistance with person/nursing care; No or mild impairment level under Standardised Care Need Assessment Mechanism for Elderly Service (SCNAMES)
Care and Attention Home for the Elderly	Residential care, meals, limited nursing care	Suffer from poor health and/or physical/ mild mental disabilities with deficiency in daily living activities; But mentally suitable for communal living; Moderate level under SCNAMES
Nursing Home	Residential care, meals, personal care, regular basic medical and nursing care	Suffer from poor health and/or physical/ mild mental disabilities with deficiency in daily living activities; But mentally suitable for communal living; Severe level under SCHNAMES; Those who cannot adequately be taken care of in Care and Attention Homes for the Elderly

=== Number of places ===
The number of places in residential care homes for elderly persons (as of 30 September 2017) is as follows:===

Types of Residential Care Services for the Elderly	Subsidized Places in Subverted Homes, Self-Financing Homes and Contract Home	Subsidized Places Under Enhanced Brought Place Scheme	Non-Subsidized Places in non-profit-Making Self-Financing Homes / Contract Homes	Total
Hostels or the Elderly	0	0	0	0
Homes or the Aged	67	0	445	512
Care and Attention Homes for the Elderly	15229	8601	3093	26383
Nursing Homes	3904	0	1517	5421
Total	19200	8061	5055	32316

== Regulation and monitoring ==
=== The Residential Care Homes (Elderly Persons) Ordinance ===
The Residential Care Homes (Elderly Persons) Ordinance (RCHE Ordinance), administered by the Director of Social Welfare (DSW) is responsible for licensing and regulating of Residential Care Homes for Elderly Persons (RCHE). The Ordinance aims to ensure residents in RCHE will receive acceptable quality of services that are beneficial to them physically, mentally and socially.

=== The Code of Practice for Residential Care Homes (Elderly Persons) ===
The Code of Practice for Residential Care Homes (Elderly Persons) (Code of Practice) provides RCHEs with principles, procedures, guidelines and standards to comply in operation and management. The details in Code of Practice includes requirements in relation to license, such as infection control, floor space, cleanliness and sanitation, social care, etc. Social Welfare Department will update and review the Code of Practice from time to time when new and additional needs arise for RCHE residents.

=== Supervisory and inspection arrangement ===
Under the RCHE Ordinance, DSW supervises RCHEs through regular inspections, providing remedial measures and requiring below-standard RCHEs to cease operations in cases of danger/perceived danger or unfulfilled requirements. In particular, DSW will inspect RCHEs in accordance to section 18 of RCHE Ordinance, covering comprehensive areas such as drug management, personal care services, handling of accidents, meals, etc.

Professional inspectorate in LORCHE under Social Welfare Department will be responsible for inspection, as well as cooperate with staff from Buildings Department and the Fire Services Department. On average, LORCHE conducts seven surprise inspections at each private RCHE annually. In addition, audit checks of RCHEs are also conducted by Senior Social Work Officer.

Upon detecting irregularities during inspection, RCHEs are required to rectify them. Advisory or warning letters will first be issued to non-compliant RCHEs, and prosecutions may be undertaken when necessary. RCHEs that have been convicted in the recent 24 months would be recorded and notified to the public.

The total number of significant incident reports submitted by RCHEs to the Social Welfare Department in the past 3 years:

Type of RCHEs	2014–15	2015–16	2016–17 (Up to end-December 2016)
Private RCHEs	230	238	178
Subvented RCHEs/ contract homes	71	72	57
Self-financing RCHEs	5	5	8

Significant incidents refer to uncommon deaths or incidents resulting in serious injuries or deaths, missing of residents that require police assistance, suspected or established cases of abuse of residents by staff, disputes requiring police assistance, serious medical incidents and other major incidents that would affect the daily operation of the RCHEs for at least 24 hours, etc.

== Challenges and issues ==
=== Cambridge Nursing Home controversy ===
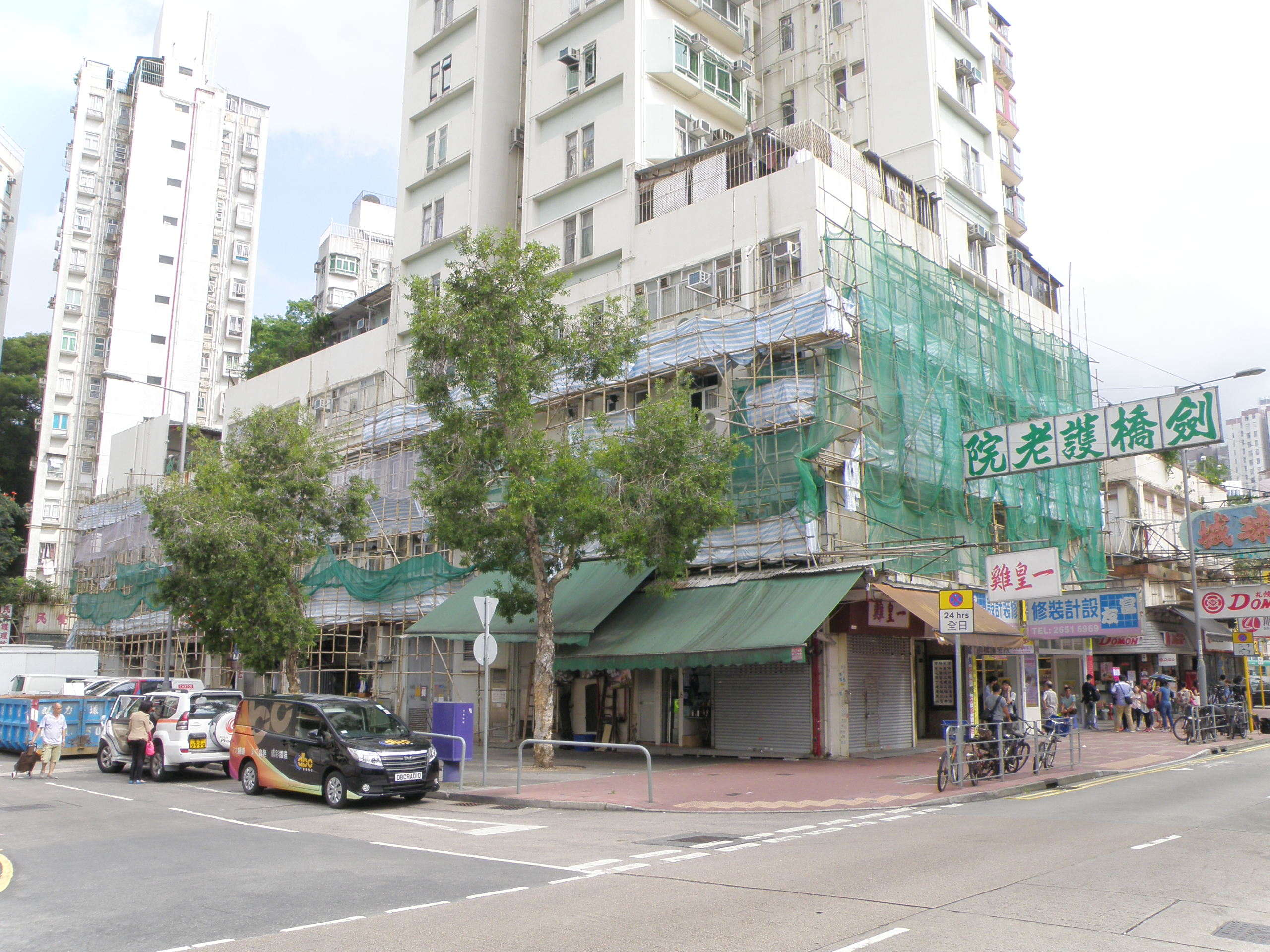
Cambridge Nursing Home in Tai Po, Hong Kong.

On 26 May 2015, Ming Pao reported that elderly residents of the Cambridge Nursing Home in Tai Po who suffered from impairment in self-care ability were stripped naked by staff members on an open-air podium, before being wheeled indoors to shower. Reports revealed that the Social Welfare Department issued 15 warnings to the Nursing Home in the past 5 years, but failed to make any prosecutions.

On the same day, the Social Welfare Department referred the case to the Tai Po district crime squad for investigation.

On 29 May, the Social Welfare Department issued a statement that the renewal application for the second and third floors would be refused in accordance with s.11 RCHE Ordinance. The appeal was rejected on 16 June. However, the license renewal application for the first-floor branch had been granted on 1 August.

=== Societal views ===
==== Shortage of nursing staff ====
Lawmaker Chan Chi Chuen reflected that the number of staffs in some RCHES did not meet the Schedule 1 of the Residential Care Homes (Elderly Persons) Regulation. Understaffing was especially serious on night shifts. According to the Labour Party, the shortage of nursing staff is due to por working conditions at RCHEs. From 1999 to 2013, the Real Salary for nursing staff decreased by 5%, whilst the average weekly working hours was 72 hours. It is common among the industry to recruit illegal labours as staffs who lack professional qualifications.

The Secretary for Labour and Welfare ("SLW") responded that understaffing was mitigated by the 1 652 imported labours working as frontline care workers in private RCHEs, which consisted 51.3% of the total 3 224 imported labour. But the Labour Party was concerned that importing foreign labours would further decrease wages.

Another lawmaker Fernando Cheung requested more surprise inspections at night time. The DSW responded that conducting inspections at midnight would disturb residents of RCHEs.

According to the Civic Party, there was a need to review the stipulated nurse-elderly resident ratio of 1:60, which is far lower than Taiwan's 1:20.

==== Insufficient spaces and long waiting time ====
According to the Social Welfare Department, as of 30 September 2017, 37,855 elderly people were waiting for Subvented Homes. The average waiting time was 36 months. In the past few years, an average of 5,000 elderlies in the queue died before they were allotted a place. In 2016, 6104 elderly people died as they were waiting for Subvented Homes.

The Society for Community Organisation stated that this highlighted the serious shortage of subsidised elderly home places.

On 28 May, Chief executive CY Leung attributed the poor treatment of residents to Hong Kong's shortage of land space during the Legislative Council's question-and-answer session. Mr Michael Tien said that the lack of suitable sites for the construction of RCHEs was a major challenge for the administration. He suggested setting up RCHEs in public rental housing premises and making the provision of RCHEs a land sale condition.

The Administration responded that it had designated 11 sites in development projects for constructing new RCHEs.

==== Issues relating to inspection and enforcement ====
1.Failure to discover Cambridge NH's Shop

On 29 May, Ming Pao reported that despite the regular inspections by SWD, the first-floor branch of Cambridge Nursing Home had been modified to operate as a shop, contravening the licensing requirements imposed by the Licensing Office of Residential Care Homes for the Elderly (LORCHE).

The SWD explained that an application to revise the layout plan by excluding part of the licensing area was received in February 2015, but the application had not yet been approved. On 4 June 2015, the SWD had issued a notice to the RCHE to give direction to cease he operation of the shop. After inspection, the operations had been ceased.

2.Understaff and “On-the-run” Staff

Mr Chan Chi Chuen reflected that some RCHEs were informed of the surprise inspections in advance, allowing understaffed RCHEs to arrange “on-the-run staff” to impersonate their staff members.

The administration responded that there were stringent procedures in verifying staff identity during inspections, including verification of identity cards, employment contracts, shift rosters, attendance records and outside work record.

3.Disclosure of Information Regarding Inspection of RCHEs

According to the Public Accounts Committee Report No. 63, inspection targets set by SWD to ensure compliance with the licensing requirements for RCHEs had not always been achieved. Follow-up inspections to 71% of the 34 high-risk RCHEs were conducted only one to three months after the target timeframe.

Dr Fernando Cheung said that despite the 58 inspections and issuance of 12 warning letters to Cambridge NH in the past five years, the complaints of elderly abuse against it were not mentioned in any of warning letters. No prosecution had been instituted against it. He suggested the public disclosure of the warning letters issued by SWD to RCHEs.

Mr Tang Ka Piu requested the Administration to provide information on the name, location, number of places and residents of high-risk RCHEs.

The Forthright Caucus (正言匯社) suggested the disclosure of the list of RCHEs that were assessed to be high-risk, available for citizens online.

DSW responded that information on high-risk RCHEs would be kept in the computer system of the Licensing Office of Residential Care Homes for the Elderly ("LORCHE") to ensure close monitoring of these RCHEs. In any case, in the case of Cambridge NH, the frequency of inspections had exceeded the target.

4.Insufficient Deterrence

According to the Civic Party, the low deterrence of being convicted of breaching the ordinances is due to the low prosecution rates. In 2016–2017, LORCHE issued 2426 advisory letter, 388 warning letters and only successfully prosecuted 8 RCHEs. No licences were terminated and no licence renewal applications were refused. / Moreover, the penalty for a single breach is low, ranges from HK$1800-HK$4000.

Moreover, the current ordinances do not include convictions on abusing elderly residents in RCHEs.

5.Unregulated High Private Fees

After the rejection of the renewal appeal to Cambridge NH's license, The Director of Social Welfare Carol Yip Man-kuen and Secretary for Labour and Welfare Matthew Cheung promised to assist the 57 Cambridge residents in relocating to affordable Nursing Homes.

However, Dr Fernando Cheung Chiu-hung discovered that 11 Nursing Homes in Tai Po charged higher fees than that available on the Welfare Department's website. In his view the administration should publicly and accurately disclose the information on the highest and lowest fees charged by private RCHEs.

The assistant director of the Social Welfare Department, Ms. Cecilia Li, replied that it took time to update the department website, therefore the fees indicated were only for purposes of reference.

6.Collection and Disclosure of information regarding Elderlies receiving visit

Leung Che Cheung expressed concern about RCHE residents who pay home fees with their Comprehensive Social Security Assistance payments, but who do not receive regular visits by relatives, as they are less likely be able to report incidents of abuse and poor living conditions. Therefore, the SWD could send officers to visit them.

The Hong Kong Council of Social Service similarly urged for the public disclosure of such information to promote transparency and accountability.

The SWD replied that it did not collect nor maintain information about such residents who do not receive regular visits by relatives.

== Government improvement measures ==
Given recent challenges and controversies, the government reviewed and implemented measures that aim to strengthen monitoring and improve quality of residential care homes.

These measures include:

1. Enhance inspection strategies

The Social Welfare Department (SWD) set up the Licensing and Regulation Branch in 2017, comprising the Risk Management and Complaints Section, Quality Service Section and Target Monitoring and Prosecution Section, in order to have better specialization and division of work for more dedicated inspection efforts in different areas.

There will also be more facilitations of monitoring between residential care homes and the inspectorate team, such as requiring them to install closed-circuit television in specified areas, regularly submit staff records, duty roster, etc.

2.Improve complaints management

The Risk Management and Complaints Section under SWD will be dedicated for handling all complaints-related work, such as on-site inspection, residents interview, enquiry of residential homes, and handling of irregularities, etc.

3.Review related legislations, ordinance, codes of practice and guidelines

A working group was set up in 2017 under SWD, the Elderly Commission and Rehabilitation Advisory Committee includes scholars, service users, elderly carers, representatives from relevant organizations to give suggestions and recommendations to amend the RCHE legislations and codes of practices.

4.Strengthen monitoring of RCHEs’ staff performance

The SWD in collaboration with relevant entities, such as the Qualifications Framework Secretariat, introduced and formulated a framework and training programme for better management of RCHEs, such as understanding of related legislations, human resources management and customer services, etc. A variety of training programme of home carers and RCHEs operators were also provided by SWD, e.g. the 15-month Training and Consultation Programme on RCHD Management in 2016, a two-year Quality Improvement Project for RCHEs, etc.

SWD would also adopt stricter recruitment mechanism for staff, such as the implementation of Sexual Conviction Record Check Scheme. Issuing license to residential homes would also include more stringent criteria, such as considerations of applicant's track record of staff performance.

5.Increase law enforcement efforts and transparency

As of 2017, SWD is reviewing and planning to revamp regulation methods, such as the arrangement for issuing warning letters and advice, as well as making warning records of residential care homes public (as of now only the list of convicted RCHEs is accessible by public). SWD has also created an online platform integrated information of over 700 RCHEs in Hong Kong for easier access and greater transparency for the public. It provides a one-stop service for people to find and compare different residential homes’ services and information.

== Government schemes to support elderly in residential care ==
Pilot Scheme on Residential Care Service Voucher for the Elderly (RCSV) The scheme, launched in March 2017, aims to provide elderly persons with more options when choosing residential care services, such as RCHEs prided by non-governmental organisations (NGOs) or the private sector. Adopting the “money-following-the-user” principle, eligible participants would be given a voucher with the value of $12,609 (as of 2017–18) to subsidise their fees for residential services. A total of 3000 RCSV were issued within the period of 2017 to 2019 in three phrases.

Pilot Residential Care Services Scheme in Guangdong SWD launched the Pilot Residential Care Services Scheme in Guangdong (the Pilot Scheme) in June 2014, aiming to provide another alternative of eligible elderly persons in the Central Waiting List for choosing RCHEs.

== Future development ==
The Chief executive's 2017 Policy Address states that the government will not only increase the service quota but also proactively improve the quality of long-term care service. There will be a four-year pilot scheme of setting up a district-based professional team, which will be composed of social workers, physiotherapists, occupational therapists etc., to offer outreach services for RCHEs and residential care homes for persons with disabilities (RCHDs). Visiting medical practitioner services for RCHEs and RCHDs will be introduced to promote the health condition of the elderly and, therefore, to reduce their reliability on the public medical system. The government will also include more recognized service providers in the Pilot Scheme on Residential Care Service Voucher to further epitomize the principle of “money-following-the-user” and to improve the service quality of private elderly homes.
