= Accounting and Financial Reporting Council =

Hong Kong statutory body

- 會計專業獨立監管機構

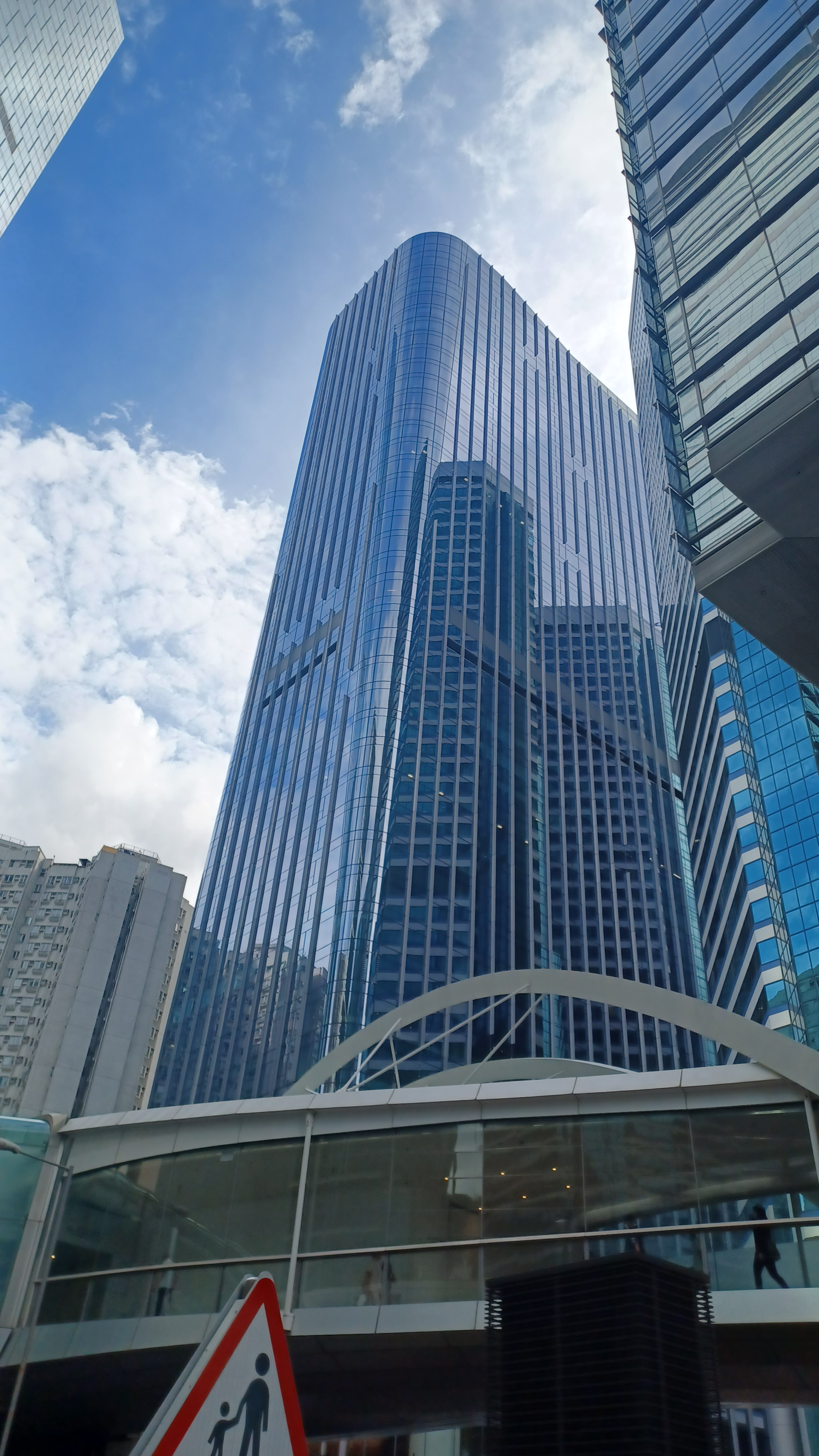
- Headquarters at Two Taikoo Place

Agency overview
- Formed: December 2006; 19 years ago
- Preceding agency: Financial Reporting Council
- Jurisdiction: Hong Kong
- Headquarters: Two Taikoo Place, Quarry Bay, Hong Kong
- Agency executives: David Sun, Chairman; Janey Lai, CEO
- Website: https://www.afrc.org.hk/

The Accounting and Financial Reporting Council (AFRC) of Hong Kong is the statutory body charged with regulating the accounting profession in Hong Kong. It oversees the performance of the Hong Kong Institute of Certified Public Accountants (HKICPA) with regards to its statutory functions towards accountancy in Hong Kong. Other duties include initiating enquiries into possible non-compliance with accounting requirements and conducting investigations into auditing misconduct. the AFRC is a regulator run independently of the Government of Hong Kong.

== History ==
The Financial Reporting Council Ordinance was gazetted in July 2006 which called for the establishment of a Financial Reporting Council (FRC) to investigate suspected irregularities committed by auditors and reporting accountants of listed entities, and to inquire into non-compliances of listed entities' financial reports with legal, accounting or regulatory requirements. Later on that year the FRC was established. It took over from the HKICPA the power to investigate audit failures of listed companies as it was independent from the accountants.

In June 2014, the Hong Kong government proposed reforms to expand the powers of the FRC. It would take over the routine inspection and disciplining of auditors of listed companies from the HKICPA. In addition the FRC would change its funding from the government, the HKICPA, the Securities and Futures Commission and the Hong Kong Stock Exchange to levies to be paid by listed companies, investors on stock transactions and listed companies' auditors. The HKICPA expressed concern that the FRC was too powerful if it was performing both the investigation and setting disciplinary action.

In July 2019, the FRC signed a memorandum of understanding with the Ministry of Finance that would allow it to obtain mainland China audit working papers for its investigations

In October 2019, the reforms related to power were passed that transformed the FRC into a full-fledged independent auditor regulator. It took over all disciplinary and regulatory inspections of listed companies’ auditors from the HKICPA. It also received HK$400 million from the government to expand its headcount. In the same year.

In December 2020, the FRC obtained its first batch of audit working papers from mainland China becoming the first offshore regulator to break through the state secrecy barrier.

In June 2021, the Hong Kong government proposed further reforms for the FRC that granted it additional powers that included regulating the professional conduct of Certified Public Accountants (CPAs), issuing practising certificates to CPAs and overseeing audits of private companies. In October 2021, the amendment bill was passed which transformed the FRC into an independent regulatory body for the accounting profession. In addition the name was changed to AFRC.

On 1 January 2022, AFRC's proposed funding model based on levies came into effect.

== Regulatory actions ==
In February 2021, the AFRC said it has begun an investigation into the financial statements of Convoy Global Holdings and singled out its auditor, Zhonghui Anda CPA for failing to raise red flags. The move was unprecedented making it the first announcement of such an inquiry since the regulator's establishment in 2006.

In October 2021, the AFRC initiated an investigation into PwC Hong Kong's audit of Evergrande Group’s 2020 financial statements. In August 2022, the AFRC expanded the scope of its investigation into the developer's property services arm. In April 2024, the AFRC said it would launch a new probe into PwC over an apparent whistleblower report from PwC Partners. The report accused PwC of failing to establish and maintain an effective system of quality control to ensure audit quality and compliance with professional standards with regards to Evergrande. In July 2024, the AFRC said it had not found evidence to support the allegations against PwC in the whistleblower report. However it was still investigating the work for Evergrande itself.

In July 2023, the AFRC stated that the audit quality of small and medium sized audit firms was poor and there was a tendency to cut corners.

In August 2024, the AFRC stated last-minute resignations and failure to recognise potential problems were the two major issues affecting auditors’ credibility in Hong Kong. Nearly a fifth of the investigations conducted on auditors were related to their late resignations.

== See also ==
- Securities and Futures Commission
- Hong Kong Monetary Authority
- List of financial supervisory authorities by country
