= Labour Department (Hong Kong) =

- 勞工處

Agency overview
- Formed: 1940
- Jurisdiction: Hong Kong
- Agency executive: Sam Hui, Commissioner for Labour
- Parent agency: Labour and Welfare Bureau
- Website: www.labour.gov.hk

The Labour Department (LD, Chinese: 勞工處) is a department of the government of Hong Kong, responsible for administrating labours and enhancing the wellbeing of Hong Kong's workforce.

== History ==
Henry Butters was appointed the first Labour Officer (Chinese: 勞工主任 or 勞工官 or 勞工司) in 1938 when the Hong Kong government was forced by London to give attention to the Chinese child labour. The Labour Department (Chinese: 勞工署 or 勞工處) was formally established in 1940 under the administration of the Secretary for Chinese Affairs. The department is headed by a Labour Officer, tasked with securing the wellbeing of the workforce and act as a mediator between workers and businesses. It expanded in the 1940s to cater the increasing need, but fell dormant during the Japanese occupation between 1941 and 1945.

In 1947, the Labour Department was reformed into an independent agency led by a Commissioner of Labour (renamed Commissioner for Labour in 1974). The duties of this new unit enlarged quickly after the war; in 1961, over 230,000 labours from more than 6,000 factories were administered by the department.

Labour Department was later placed under the Education and Manpower Bureau, and under the Economic Development and Labour Bureau in 2002 following a governmental reorganisation, before being handed to the Labour and Welfare Bureau in 2007.

== List of heads ==
- Henry Butters (1938–39)
- Edward Irvine Wynne-Jones (1939–40)
- B. C. K. Hawkins (1940–41, 1945–46, 1946–55)
- Quentin Allison Ashby Macfadyen (1946, 1955)
- P. C. M. Sedgwick (1955–65)
- Robert Marshall Hetherington (1965–71)
- Paul Tsui Ka-cheung (1971–73)
- Ian Robert Price (1973–77)
- Peter Barry Williams (1977–78)
- James Neil Henderson (1978–83)
- Ronald Bridge (1983–86)
- Joseph Charles Anthony Hammond (1986–91)
- Darwin Chen Tat-man (1991–92)
- Katherine Fok (1992–94)
- Stephen Ip (Dec 1994–Mar 1996)
- Jacqueline Ann Willis (April 1994 – January 1999)
- Matthew Cheung (January 1999 – June 2000, July 2003 – March 2007)
- Pamela Tan Kam Mi-wah (June 2000 – June 2003)
- Paul Tang (April 2007 – June 2007)
- Cherry Tse Ling Kit-ching (July 2007 – November 2010)
- Cheuk Wing-hing (November 2010 – February 2014)
- Donald Tong Chi-keung (March 2014 – September 2016)
- Carlson Chan Ka-shun (October 2016 – December 2020)
- Chris Sun (December 2020 – June 2022)
- May Chan Wing-shiu (September 2022 – June 2025)
- Sam Hui Chark-shum (July 2025 –)
