= P. C. M. Sedgwick =

Commissioner for Labour
- In office June 1955 – 1 July 1965
- Preceded by: Q. A. A. Macfadyen
- Succeeded by: R. M. Hetherington

Personal details
- Born: Patrick Cardinall Mason Sedgwick; 8 March 1911 Bromley, United Kingdom
- Died: 22 January 1985 (aged 73) Surrey, United Kingdom
- Education: Brasenose College, Oxford
- Occupation: Colonial civil servant

Patrick Cardinall Mason Sedgwick CMG (Chinese: 石智益, 1911–1985) was a British civil servant. Having served in the Hong Kong colonial government from 1935 to 1969, Sedgwick was the longest-serving Commissioner for Labour, leading the Labour Department for a decade.

== Early life ==
Born in Bromley, then in Kent, on 8 March 1911, Patrick Cardinall Mason Sedgwick was the second son of William Francis Mason Sedgwick and Kathleen Cordy. Sedgwick studied in St Lawrence College, Ramsgate, before reading Bachelor of Arts at Brasenose College, Oxford, and being enrolled into Queens' College, Cambridge.

== Civil service ==
Sedgwick joined the colonial service in 1935, starting as a Cadet Officer at Hong Kong. He served under the Colonial Secretary, the Sanitary Department, and as the secretary of a committee on expansion of Kai Tak Airport. Following the outbreak of the World War II, Sedgwick worked in the new Economic Warfare Office as an Intellectual Officer.

Sedgwick left Hong Kong and seconded the Malayan Civil Service between December 1941 and February 1942, when he retreated from Malaya amidst the Japanese invasion. He then briefly served in the Ministry of Economic Warfare. His next position, as an attaché at the British Embassy in Chungking, was responsible for aiding refugees. Sedgwick also worked with Northern Guangdong's British Army Aid Group to shelter Hong Kong refugees who were fleeing Japanese occupation, until he was sent back to London in October 1943, and became a member of Colonial Office's Hong Kong Planning Unit in January 1944 to come up with a plan for the post-war city.

Japan surrendered in August 1945, and the governance of Hong Kong was handed to the British provisional government led by military officers. Sedgwick, now awarded with the rank of Lt Col, stayed in London to support the administration. He returned to Hong Kong in early 1946. Between 1946 and 1951, he served at various offices including the Financial Secretary office and the secretariat for the Executive and Legislative Councils; and was acting several positions including political advisor to the governor, Chairman of Urban Council and Director of Urban Services.

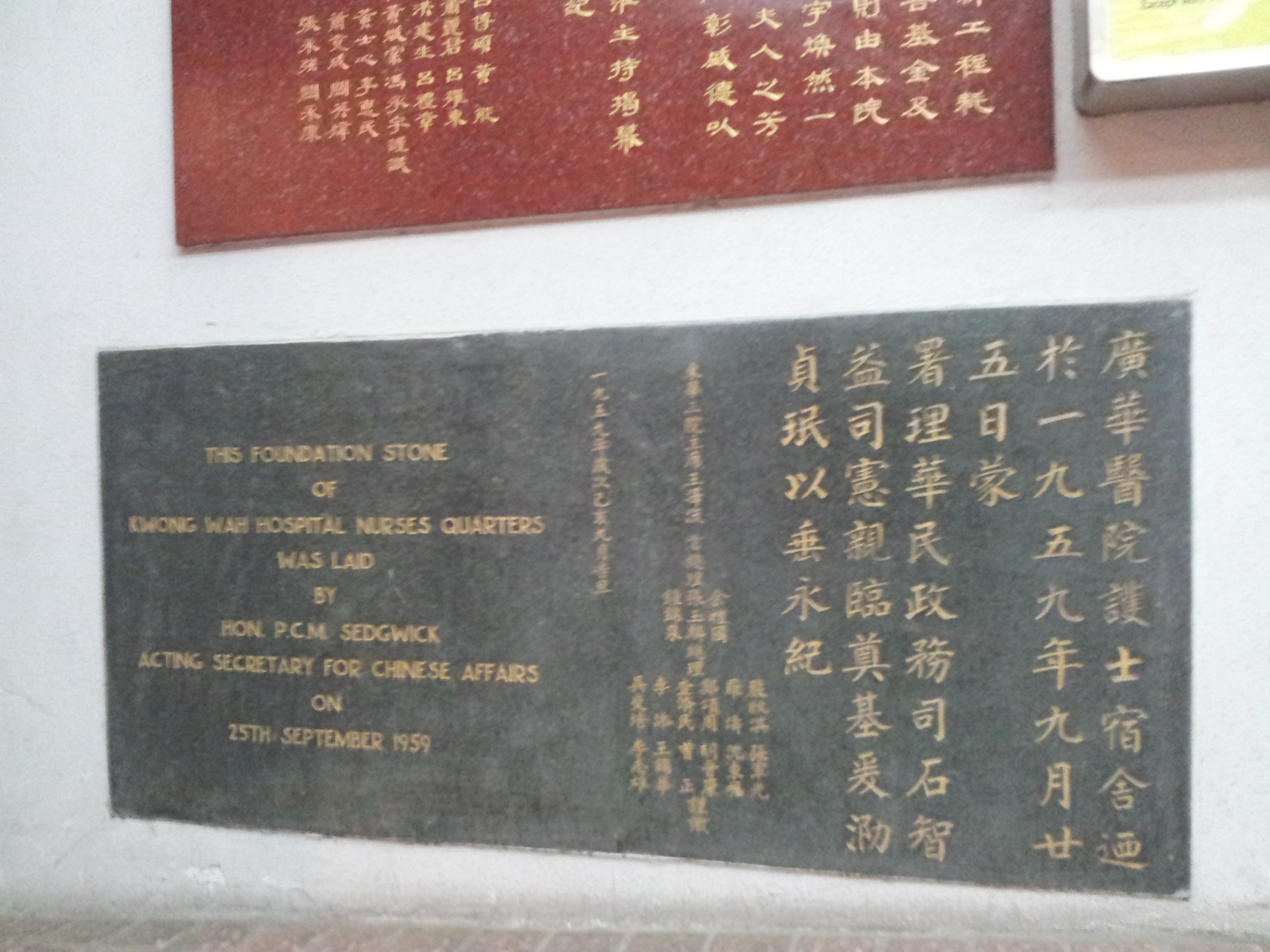
Foundation stone at Kwong Wah Hospital unveiled by Sedgwick as acting Chinese secretary

Sedgwick was appointed Director of Commerce and Industry in January 1952, having served as the acting director for four months. He became Deputy Commissioner of Labour in 1954, and promoted to Commissioner of Labour and Mines in June 1955. During his ten-year realm at the Labour Department, he pushed for the growth of industrial buildings in the resettlement areas across Hong Kong to boost the small-scale industry of the city, and reorganised the department in 1965 for an increase of efficiency. He was also a courtier at the University of Hong Kong, a member of the Executive Council and Legislative Council, and, at four occasions, acting Secretary for Chinese Affairs.

== Later career ==
Sedgwick left his role as the longest-serving Commissioner of Labour after 10 years in office. Governor David Trench thanked him "for his manifold services to the Colony during the past 30 years". He departed Hong Kong on 27 July, and began his role as the Hong Kong Commissioner in London in October under a special arrangement despite reaching the retirement age. He was awarded CMG in 1965 Birthday Honours by Queen Elizabeth II a month later.

Following his retirement, Sedgwick was invited to chair a civil service's pay survey committee for Saint Helena in 1971, and for Falkland Islands and Mauritius in 1972. He died in Sussex, where he lived after retirement, on 22 January 1985 at the age of 73.

== Personal life ==
Sedgwick practiced Anglicanism. A sailing and gardening enthusiast, he was a member of Bewl Valley Sailing Club, Royal Hong Kong Yacht Club, and Hong Kong Club.

Sedgwick married Beth Mannering Thompson, from St Kilda, Victoria of Australia, in 1943. They have three sons and a daughter.

== See also ==
- Sedgwick family
