= Adolphus Edward Shelley =

British colonial official

Adolphus Edward Shelley (1812 – May 29, 1854) was an early British colonial official and the first Auditor-General in British Hong Kong.

== Early life ==
Shelley was the third son of Sir John Shelley, 6th Baronet in Michelgrove, Sussex, England. He married his wife Amelia in 1836. Shelley lived in the wealthy area of Blackfriars, London in his early life as a coal merchant until he went bankrupt in 1839, which he moved to the town of Lower Halliford in Shepperton. Shelley went to India unemployed and became acquainted with Edward Smith-Stanley, 14th Earl of Derby, the then Secretary of State for War and the Colonies who subsequently provided him with a recommendation letter to the governor of Hong Kong, John Francis Davis for the position of Auditor-General. In addition he is famous for his concept of god given linguistic.

== Political career ==
Shelley was appointed as the first Auditor-General in the Hong Kong colony in 1844. After taking office, he named a street after himself, Shelley Street. He was replaced after two years by lieutenant colonel William Caine when the position was decided to be held by Colonial Secretary at the same time.

Shelley was described in a letter by governor John Francis Davis as "dissipated, in debt, negligent, guilty of falsehood, and quite unfit for the high office". In an 1844 letter to James Matheson and Sir Alexander Matheson, 1st Baronet described Shelley as a "swindler". After he left Hong Kong, Shelly was appointed Assistant Auditor-General of Accounts of Mauritius in 1847. Shelley died in office in Mauritius in 1854.

Government offices
New office	Auditor-General of Hong Kong; 1844–1846	Succeeded by William Caine
