= Benjamin Tang =

Benjamin Tang, GBS (Chinese: 鄧國斌, born 1 December 1951) is a former Director of Audit with the Audit Commission of Hong Kong.

== Education ==
Tang graduated from the University of Hong Kong in economics and sociology. Tang also studied at the Oxford University, the London Business School and the Toronto International Leadership Centre for Financial Sector Supervision.

== Career ==
In October 1974, Tang joined Hong Kong civil service as an Administrative Officer. Tang served in various bureaucracies and departments and worked in policy areas that covered district administration, sports and culture, transport, municipal services and the environment.

Tang's career also included working in the Hong Kong Government Office in London in the mid 80s and the Independent Commission Against Corruption in the early 90s. He was the Government Printer from March 1998 to January 2000 and the Commissioner of Insurance from January 2000 to November 2003. Tang left the Administrative Service and was appointed the Director of Audit in December 2003.

In October 2012 he was appointed as Commissioner of Commission of Inquiry into the Collision of Vessels near Lamma Island on 1 October 2012.

Government offices
| Preceded by Dominic Chan | Director of Audit; 2003–2012 | Succeeded by David Sun |
Order of precedence
| Preceded by Timothy Tong; Recipients of the Gold Bauhinia Star | Hong Kong order of precedence Recipients of the Gold Bauhinia Star | Succeeded by Michael Hartmann; Recipients of the Gold Bauhinia Star |
