= Minimum Wage Ordinance =

Legislation of Hong Kong

Legislative Council of Hong Kong
- Long title: An Ordinance to provide for a minimum wage at an hourly rate for certain employees; to establish a Minimum Wage Commission and to make consequential amendments to the Labour Tribunal Ordinance, the Employment Ordinance, the Minor Employment Claims Adjudication Board Ordinance and the Disability Discrimination Ordinance.
- Citation: Cap. 608
- Passed by: Legislative Council of Hong Kong
- Passed: 17 July 2010
- Commenced: 23 July 2010

Legislative history
- Introduced by: Secretary for Labour and Welfare Matthew Cheung
- Introduced: 26 June 2009
- First reading: 8 July 2009
- Second reading: 15 July 2010
- Third reading: 17 July 2010

Amends
- 2012, 2013, 2014, 2015, 2016, 2017

Related legislation
- Labour Tribunal Ordinance; Employment Ordinance; Minor Employment Claims Adjudication Board Ordinance; Disability Discrimination Ordinance
- Status: Current legislation

The Minimum Wage Ordinance Cap. 608 is an ordinance enacted by the Legislative Council of Hong Kong to introduce a minimum wage in Hong Kong in July 2010. The executive branch proposed a minimum wage of HK$28 (~US$3.61) per hour in November 2010, which the Legislative Council voted to accept after much debate in January 2011. It came into effect on 1 May 2011. Prior to this, there had also been a fixed minimum wage for one specific class of workers, foreign domestic helpers, of HK$3,740/month. As 1 May 2025, the Hong Kong statutory minimum wage for non-domestic workers is HK$42.1 per hour.

== History ==
Hong Kong had some legislation relating to the minimum wage as early as 1932; the Governor was granted the right, but was not obliged, to establish a minimum wage. The Trade Boards Ordinance also gave the governor (and after 1997, the Chief Executive) the power to set minimum wages for piece-rate and time-rate work, and established penalties for non-compliance. However, no governor exercised these powers. In 2006, legislators floated a proposal for a voluntary minimum wage. The executive branch formed a Minimum Wage Provisional Commission in February 2009 to research and eventually set a proposed wage floor.

More debate came about on the possibility of a minimum wage in 2010. Legislator Tommy Cheung, who represents the catering functional constituency, suggested that the minimum wage be no greater than HK$20. This earned him the derogatory nickname "Twenty-dollar Cheung". (Note: 張廿蚊 (Jēung Yàhmān) or 廿蚊張 (Yàhmān Jēung). This can also mean "twenty dollars per sheet", as his surname "Cheung" is also a classifier used for banknotes.) He later amended his proposal to HK$24. Lam Woon-kwong of the Equal Opportunities Commission also indicated he had no objection to a lower minimum wage for disabled people. Chief Executive Donald Tsang was opposed to the whole concept of a minimum wage, according to legislator Lee Cheuk-yan of the Hong Kong Confederation of Trade Unions. Other voices of opposition included the free-market think tank Lion Rock Institute, as well as Miriam Lau of the Liberal Party, who gave estimates that between 30,000 and 170,000 jobs would be lost as a result of the proposal, depending on the wage adopted.

=== Passage of the Minimum Wage Bill ===
The Minimum Wage Bill was passed on 15 July 2010 by a vote of 53–1 after extensive debate which included the tabling of 34 amendments. The lone opposition vote came from Paul Tse, a functional constituency legislator representing the tourism sector. The bill required the Chief Executive to propose a minimum wage level, which LegCo would then either approve or reject the amount. The law did not give LegCo the power to amend the amount. The proposed minimum wage had been expected to be between HK$23 and HK$33 per hour. Among the amendments:

- Lee Cheuk-yan proposed including foreign domestic helpers in the scope of the bill. Defeated 9–26 with 17 abstentions.
- Lee Cheuk-yan proposed that overtime and commissions should be excluded from the minimum wage. Defeated.
- The government proposed an exemption of internships from the minimum wage legislation. Passed.
- The government proposed that the Trade Boards Ordinance should be repealed. Defeated 26–28.

=== Setting and implementation of minimum wage ===
On 10 November 2010, a HK$28 (~US$3.59) per hour rate was recommended by the Provisional Minimum Wage Commission and adopted by the Chief Executive-in-Council. The Legislative Council voted to accept the proposed wage on 5 January 2011. It came into force on 1 May 2011.

The law does not mandate that meal breaks and rest days be paid; Secretary for Labour and Welfare Matthew Cheung stated that this should be decided by private negotiation between employers and employees. There were fears that the implementation of the law might actually lead to lower take-home pay for low-income workers who currently receive paid meal breaks. In November 2010, before the minimum wage came into effect, fast-food chain Cafe de Coral had forced staff to sign new contracts that would give them a pay raise but see their paid meal breaks forfeited, effectively leading to lower pay. In April 2011, Edward Cheng, president of the Hong Kong Association of Property Management Companies, the largest property management association in Hong Kong, stated that he would appeal to their members to retain paid meal breaks for estate security guards where possible; however, he pointed out that the property owners themselves would have to approve any consequent increases in management fees.

== Ongoing review ==
=== 2013 review ===
On 1 May 2013, the statutory minimum wage is reviewed, and to be set at the level at $30 (~US$3.87). This is to be in effect from 1 May 2013 to 30 April 2015, as the minimum wage is set to be reviewed every two years.

=== 2015 review ===
On 1 May 2015, the statutory minimum wage is reviewed and to be set at $32.5 (~US$4.19). This is to be in effect from 1 May 2015 to 30 April 2017.

=== 2022 review ===
The minimum hourly wage will be increased from to HK$40 per hour from 1 May 2023. It was gazetted on 13 January 2023.

=== 2025 review ===
The minimum hourly wage was increased to $42.1 from 1 May 2025.

=== 2026 review ===
Subject to the Legislative Council's approval, the minimum hourly wage will be increased to $43.1 from 1 May 2026.

== Foreign domestic helpers ==
Foreign domestic helpers' minimum wages are inflation-adjusted annually for contracts about to be signed, and apply for the duration of the contract. Furthermore, FDHs are entitled to one 24-hour rest period each week. An employer's failure to meet this minimum level may result in a fine as high as HK$350,000 and three years' imprisonment.

The minimum wage for FDHs was reduced by HK$190 (5%) in 1999. Again in April 2003, in a deflationary environment, the Government announced a HK$400 reduction in pay, to HK$3,270, "due to the steady drop in a basket of economic indicators since 1999." This led to lawsuits by some Filipinos in Hong Kong. The minimum allowable wage was raised by HK$80 to HK$3,480 per month for contracts signed on or after 6 June 2007. Another HK$100 cost of living adjustment took effect for all employment contracts signed on or after 17 July 2008, increasing the minimum wage to HK$3,580 per month. In September 2017, the minimum wage was further increased from HK$4,310 to $4,410 per month. As of 2019, the minimum wage of FDHs are set to HK$4,630/month.
