= 2012 Lamma Island ferry collision =

Maritime disaster in Hong Kong

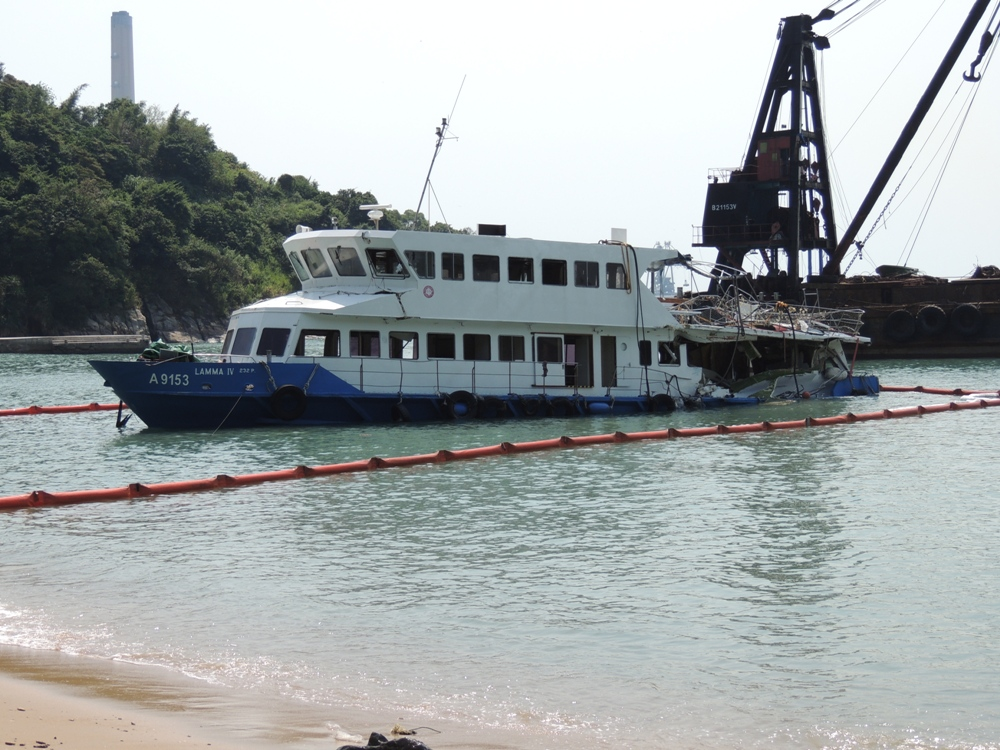
- Lamma IV after her recovery, showing severe damage to her port side
- Native name: 香港南丫海難
- Date: 1 October 2012; 14 years ago
- Time: 20:23 HKT (UTC+08:00)
- Location: Half a mile off Yung Shue Wan, Lamma Island, Hong Kong; 22°14′8″N 114°6′14″E
- Cause: Collision
- Outcome: Sinking of Lamma IV, Sea Smooth damaged
- Deaths: 39
- Injuries: 92
- Inquiries: Report of the Commission of Inquiry into the Collision of Vessels near Lamma Island on 1 October 2012
- Website: www.coi-lamma.gov.hk/eng/index.html

On 1 October 2012, at approximately 20:23 HKT, the passenger ferries Sea Smooth and Lamma IV collided off Yung Shue Wan, Lamma Island, Hong Kong. This occurred on the National Day of the People's Republic of China, and one of the ships was headed for the commemorative firework display, scheduled to take place half an hour later. With 39 killed and 92 injured, the incident was the deadliest maritime disaster in Hong Kong since 1971.

On 14 February 2015, Sea Smooth′s captain Lai Sai-ming was convicted of 39 counts of manslaughter over the deaths, while Lamma IV′s captain Chow Chi-wai was acquitted of the same charges by the High Court. Both men were found guilty of endangering the safety of others at sea. On 16 February, Lai and Chow were sentenced to eight years' and nine months' imprisonment respectively.

== Background ==
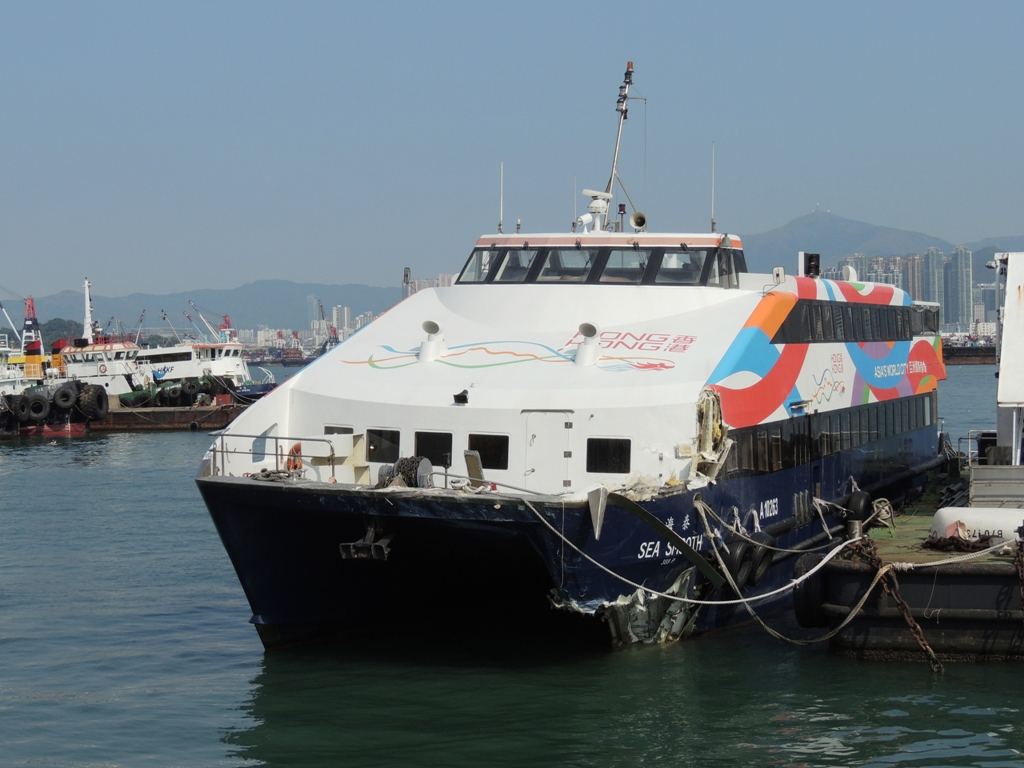
Sea Smooth after the collision, showing damage on the left bow

The accident involved a Hong Kong & Kowloon Ferry-operated passenger ferry, Sea Smooth (海泰號), and a Hongkong Electric Company-owned vessel, Lamma IV (南丫四號), with 121 passengers and 3 crew members on board. The passenger ferry was travelling from Central to Yung Shue Wan, while the Hongkong Electric Company vessel was travelling from Lamma Island to Central. Passengers on Lamma IV were on a one-day tour organised by the company, and were headed to Central for the fireworks display commemorating the National Day of the PRC following a tour of the Lamma Power Station. Participants of the tour mostly joined as families, and as a result there were a number of children among the passengers.

== Accident ==
At approximately 20:23, the bow of Sea Smooth collided with the stern of Lamma IV on her port side, rupturing two of the latter ship's watertight compartments which quickly flooded. Lamma IV soon capsized with her aft sinking into the sea. The vessel reportedly went down so quickly that more than 100 passengers were thrown into the water unprotected despite an abundance of life vests on board. Sea Smooth' left the scene after the accident and continued on to Yung Shue Wan pier. The front of Sea Smooth was damaged and its captain was also sent to the local hospital after the accident, along with several passengers, for injuries.

== Casualties ==
A total of 39 people were killed in the accident, all from Lamma IV. 30 were pronounced dead at the scene, while eight others were pronounced dead upon arrival at hospitals. one passenger died in hospital on 5 October.

92 people on both vessels were injured, four of whom sustained severe injuries. While the Hongkong Electric company claimed 124 people were on Lamma IV, police suspected that there might have been more on board as company employees were allowed to invite their own friends. As a result, the number of people missing remained unknown.

== Rescue efforts ==
An air-and-sea rescue effort was initiated. The Fire Services Department deployed 10 launches, including a diving support vessel and mobilised 350 officers, including fire and ambulance personnel and more than 60 ambulances (including ambulances from St John Ambulance and Auxiliary Medical Service). The injured were taken to five hospitals around Hong Kong. The Hong Kong government had requested help from the nearby Guangdong province to aid in search-and-rescue, but external resources were not deployed at all as domestic resources were seen as adequate by the rescue forces.

== Investigation ==
Initial speculations on the cause of the accident included speeding and overloading. However, witnesses on Lamma IV claimed that the ship was cruising at a steady speed. Overloading was also ruled out as the vessel had a capacity of 200 passengers. Andy Tsang, the Commissioner of Police, stated that seven crew members of the vessels were arrested the day after the accident, for "endangering people's lives at sea". A commission of inquiry was formed to investigate the cause of the accident.

The Commission of Inquiry into the Collision of Vessels near Lamma Island on 1 October 2012, with Justice Michael Lunn as Chairman and Benjamin Tang as Commissioner, was appointed by the Chief Executive in Council to inquire into the facts and circumstances leading to and surrounding the collision. The Commission of Inquiry submitted its report to the Chief Executive on 19 April 2013. The full report is available on the website of the Commission.

The Hong Kong Police crime statistics for 2013 included the 39 killed as part of the city's overall murder rate for the year in the annual Crime in Hong Kong reports.

== Reactions ==
=== Hongkong Electric ===
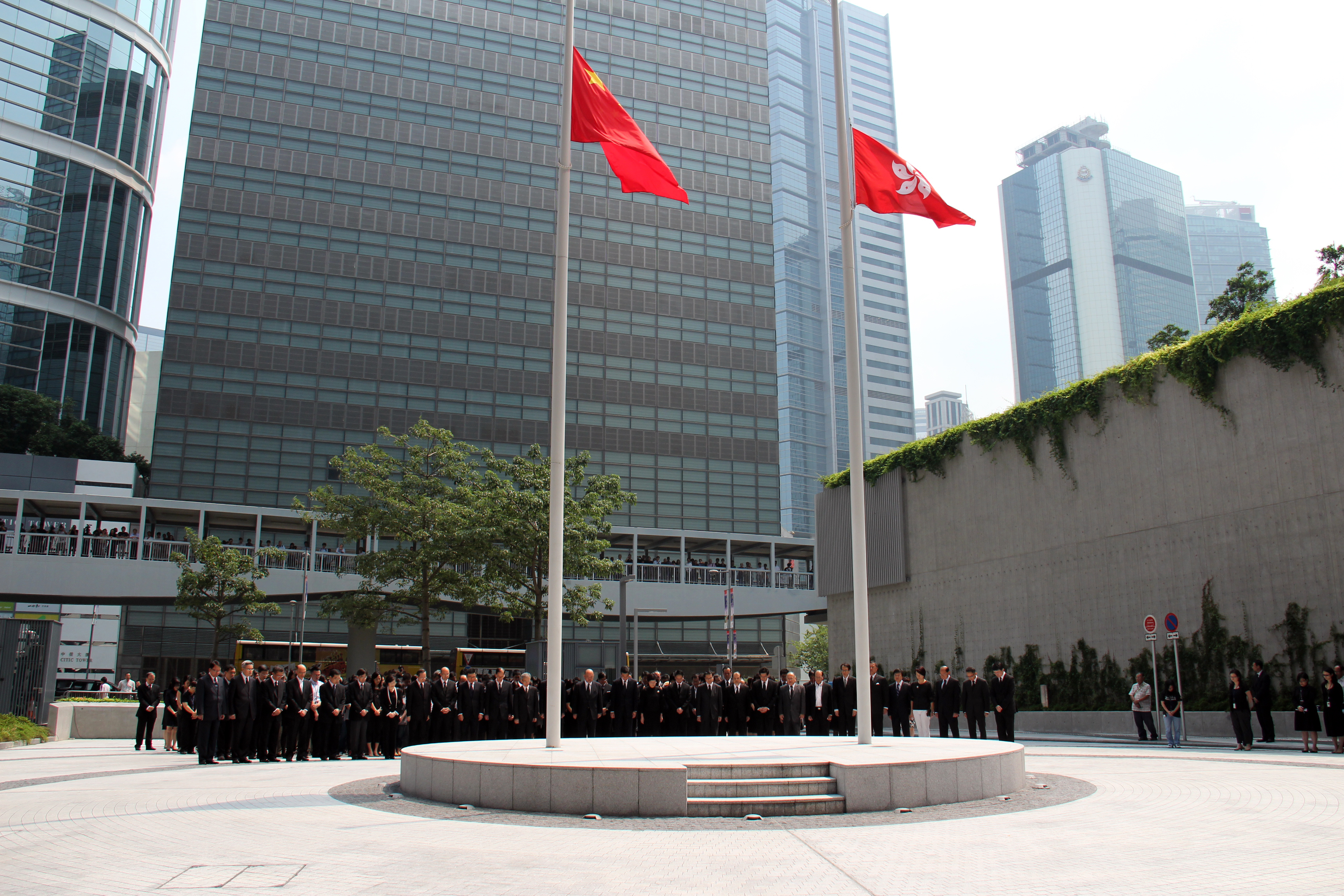
Chief Executive Leung and other government officials observe three minutes of silence outside the Central Government Complex in Tamar, while the flags of Hong Kong and China are flown at half-mast

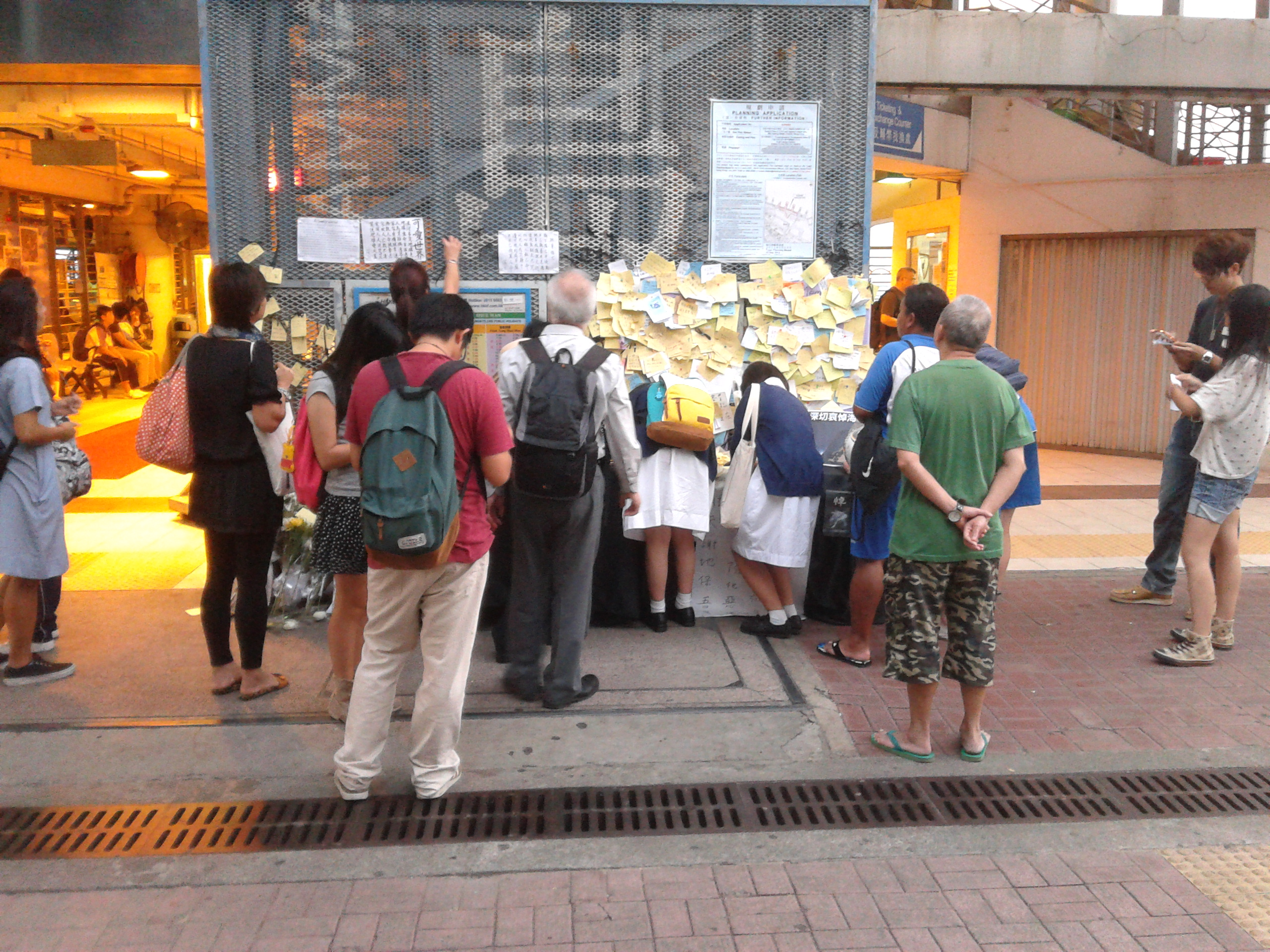
Mourners signed the condolence book at the Central ferry pier for ferries to Lamma Island.

On 2 October, the flags of Cheung Kong Group companies were all flown at half-mast at the Cheung Kong Center, headquarters of Hongkong Electric's parent company. Hongkong Electric confirmed that seven of those who died were staff of the Company. HK Electric announced that families of each of the deceased would receive a HK$200,000 emergency relief. Li Ka Shing, who controls HK Electric, immediately returned to the city the next morning. It was announced that the Li Ka Shing Foundation would set aside a total of HK$30 million for victims and their families that would be in addition to the emergency relief already offered by HKE to the families of the deceased.

=== Hong Kong Government ===
Three days of mourning were declared by Chief Executive Leung Chun-ying, starting on 4 October, during which the flag of Hong Kong was flown at half-mast on all government buildings. On 4 October, Leung, along with other government officials, observed three minutes of silence outside the Central Government Offices at 12:00. Schools and other public offices also observed a moment of silence. Condolence points were set up in each of the 18 districts during the mourning period.

The government cancelled the 2013 National Day Fireworks as a result of the incident.

=== Others ===
On 2 October, British Prime Minister David Cameron sent Chief Executive Leung his condolences. Catherine Ashton, High Representative for Foreign Affairs of the European Union, also expressed her sadness and sent her condolences through a spokesman.

== Controversies ==
The decision by the captain of Sea Smooth to leave the scene sparked a heated debate, namely whether saving oneself, or risking oneself for the others has a high priority. At first, reports stated that the captain continued on to the pier out of passenger request and out of fear that Sea Smooth herself might sink, but later reports also claimed that some passengers urged the captain to stop. In the few days following the accident, the captain had remained emotionally unstable even after being discharged from the hospital.

After he was informed of the accident, Chief Executive Leung Chun-ying immediately set out to the scene to oversee the rescue efforts. Some media suggested it was a "political show", and said that his presence might have actually slowed down the rescue.

Leung was also criticised by pro-democracy supporters for his decision to ask for help from Mainland China through the Liaison Office of the Central People's Government, despite the abundance of manpower and resources already in Hong Kong. Many saw this as increased influence and reliance on the Central government, a change from the previous Tsang administration. Also, despite Leung's clarification that no ship from Mainland China had been deployed in the rescue, on 3 October Mainland China's China News Service reported that "95 people had been rescued by the professional Chinese rescue fleet". The news agency later deleted the number rescued, but the report had not been fully withdrawn and the claim remained that Chinese ships had helped in the rescue.
