= Cabinet reshuffle =

Rotation of ministers by the government

A cabinet reshuffle or shuffle in Canadian usage, occurs when a head of government rotates or changes the composition of ministers in their cabinet, or when the head of state changes the head of government and a number of ministers. They are more common in parliamentary systems than in systems where cabinet heads must be confirmed by a separate legislative body, and occur frequently in autocratic systems.

A shadow cabinet reshuffle may take place to change positions in a shadow cabinet.

== In parliamentary systems ==
Cabinet reshuffles happen in parliamentary systems for a variety of reasons. Periodically, smaller reshuffles are needed to replace ministers who have resigned, retired or died. Reshuffles are also a way for a head of government to "refresh" the government, often in the face of poor polling numbers; remove poor performers; and reward supporters and punish others. It is common after elections, even if the party in power is retained, as the prime minister's reading of public opinion as evidenced by the election may require some change in policy, in addition to any changes resulting from the retirement or defeat of individual ministers at the election. Similarly, prime ministers entering office from the same party as the previous one might appoint a very different ministry than their predecessor to reflect a change in policies and priorities; an example is Gordon Brown's government, formed on 28 June 2007 after the departure of Tony Blair the previous day.

A reshuffle also provides an opportunity to create, abolish and rename departments (and ministerial posts), and to reassign responsibilities among departments. This may be done to reflect new priorities or for reasons of efficiency.

=== Canada ===
- 2018 Canadian cabinet shuffle
- 2021 Canadian cabinet shuffle
- 2023 Canadian cabinet reshuffle

=== India ===
- 2021 Indian cabinet reshuffle

=== Sweden ===
- 2024 Swedish government reshuffle

=== United Kingdom ===
- 1962 British cabinet reshuffle
- 1999 British cabinet reshuffle
- 2006 British cabinet reshuffle
- 2012 British cabinet reshuffle
- 2014 British cabinet reshuffle
- 2018 British cabinet reshuffle
- 2020 British cabinet reshuffle
- 2021 British cabinet reshuffle
- July 2022 British cabinet reshuffle
- February 2023 British cabinet reshuffle
- November 2023 British cabinet reshuffle
- 2025 British cabinet reshuffle

==== Shadow Cabinet reshuffle ====
- 2016 British shadow cabinet reshuffle
- May 2021 British shadow cabinet reshuffle
- November 2021 British shadow cabinet reshuffle
- 2023 British shadow cabinet reshuffle
- 2025 British shadow cabinet reshuffle

=== Malaysia ===
- 2023 Malaysian cabinet reshuffle

== In other democratic systems ==
Cabinet reshuffles are far less common in systems where members of the cabinet are not drawn from the legislative branch. In such systems there is a far larger pool of viable candidates to choose a cabinet from. Members of such cabinets are usually chosen on account of their qualifications to run a specific portfolio, so moving these cabinet members to different portfolios at a later time usually makes little sense.

In the United States (a presidential system), it would be very unusual for a president to reassign multiple cabinet secretaries to new positions, especially since a U.S. cabinet member moved to a new position within the cabinet needs to be confirmed in the new role by the United States Senate—this alone is seen as a powerful deterrent against U.S. presidents initiating major cabinet reshuffles. On an individual basis, however, U.S. cabinet members will occasionally change departments—for example, Federico Peña served as Secretary of Transportation from 1993 until 1997 in the Clinton administration and was appointed as Secretary of Energy directly afterwards, serving until 1998. Likewise Norman Mineta served as Secretary of Commerce under Bill Clinton before becoming Secretary of Transportation for Clinton's successor, George W. Bush.

In France (a semi-presidential system within the framework of the contemporary French Fifth Republic), the prime minister may tender their resignation to the president of the Republic, who then selects a successor. The new prime minister then proposes a list of ministers to the president, who may approve the list or request changes. After the list is approved, the new government is put in office. The same practice may be used to change several ministers in one sweep while retaining the same prime minister, in which case the president simply selects the incumbent as their own successor. Such successive governments with one same prime minister are named after the head of government and numbered (for instance "Rocard I and "Rocard II" or "Ayrault I and Ayrault II").

In the Philippines, while under the presidential system, the cabinet is confirmed by the Commission on Appointments composed of members of Congress; due to patronage, the president's appointments are able to be confirmed easier than on other systems. While cabinet reshuffles are still rare, it occurs when the administration loses a midterm election, as what happened most recently in 2025, and after a political scandal, in 2005. In the Philippines, cabinet reshuffles are often called as "rigodon", from rigodón, a traditional Filipino dance characterized by dancers regularly changing their partners.

=== United States ===
- Saturday Night Massacre
- Halloween Massacre

=== France ===
- July 2022 French government reshuffle
- July 2023 French government reshuffle

=== Philippines ===
- 2025 Philippine cabinet reshuffle

== In undemocratic systems ==
Cabinet reshuffles occur at the pleasure of monarchs or dictators in autocratic systems, which lack the checks-and-balances of systems with greater citizen or legislative control.

=== Brunei ===
- 2005 Bruneian cabinet reshuffle
- 2010 Bruneian cabinet reshuffle
- 2015 Bruneian cabinet reshuffle
- 2018 Bruneian cabinet reshuffle
- 2022 Bruneian cabinet reshuffle

=== Hong Kong ===
- 2020 Hong Kong cabinet reshuffle
- 2021 Hong Kong cabinet reshuffle

== See also ==
- List of people who have held multiple United States Cabinet-level positions
