= Accountancy in Hong Kong =

Accountancy in Hong Kong is regulated by the HKICPA under the Professional Accountants Ordinance (Chapter 50, Laws of Hong Kong) as well as the Accounting and Financial Reporting Council.

The auditing industry for limited companies is regulated under the Companies Ordinance (Chapter 32, Laws of Hong Kong), and other Ordinances such as the Securities and Futures Ordinance, the Listing Rules, etc.

== Accounting standards ==
The regulating of accountancy, auditing, membership, professional, licensing all falls under the HKICPA. However, in many cases, the HKICPA themselves are helpless in concluding what constitutes properly prepared financial statements. There were some attempts in obtaining external professional legal opinions on behalf of its members (e.g. what constitutes "true and fair") but they are non-binding in court. The ultimate True and Fair / True and Correct of a set of published financial statement falls under the Court system in Hong Kong, which relies on the generally accepted practice in Hong Kong. This is consistent with other common law practices.

In 2005, the HKICPA adopted almost all the most current accounting and auditing standards from the IFAC and its associated standard setting bodies with the additions of a few local written interpretations of these principal based accounting and auditing standards. Local written interpretations try to cater to the unique situations in Hong Kong such as the problem of the remaining land lease.

Prior to the formation of HKICPA in 1972 (or formerly known as HKSA before 2004 September), the auditing industry was loosely regulated. Organizations including The Society of Chinese Accountants and Auditors ("SCAACPA") has helped in standardising recognised auditors for financial statements.

There were also few serious accounting and auditing standards prior to 1986. Before 1972, auditing standards were often upheld by the individual integrity of these professional auditors. Accounting standards were based on the few international firms in the then colony including Lowe, Bingham and Matthews, KPMG, Sanford Yung, etc.

1972 was seen as a turning point for the accountancy profession in Hong Kong. Most international accounting firms (the forebears of the Big Four accounting firms today) established their presence in Hong Kong within a few years before or after the establishment of HKICPA.

In 1974, the British-based accountancy body with a global presence – Association of Chartered Certified Accountants (ACCA) assisted with setting up the Hong Kong Institute of Certified Public Accountants (formerly named "Hong Kong Society of Accountants") as the local statutory accountancy body in Hong Kong.

HKSA looked upon the exams from 2 accountancy bodies – the aforementioned ACCA from UK and the ASCPA from Australia. At that time university education in the Colony was less common than nowadays. Both accountancy bodies did not require university degree and so HKSA deemed these as suitable for the Hong Kong admission standards.

Around 1985, the HKICPA adopted most of their auditing and accounting standards from ICAEW.

Around 1990, the former HKSA (HKICPA), named Association of International Accountants (AIA) for full exemption.

Around 1994, the HKICPA slowly adopted their auditing and accounting standards from the IFAC and its associated standard setting bodies. Full integration was achieved by the HKICPA within 10 years, i.e. in 2005. Senior accountants in Hong Kong may consider this a period of re-learning, adoption of frameworks and principle based standards and a more stringent in governance and regulation of the accounting profession.

British qualified accountants and accountants from British Commonwealth have played an important role in HK accountancy profession.

== Accountancy practitioners ==
There are no restrictions to call himself an "accountant" in Hong Kong as long as it does not imply that he is actually a certified public accountant. However, "non-qualified" individuals (including those who were qualified overseas but not registered with HKICPA as an International Associate) who call themselves CPA(Hong Kong) or CPA(practising) in Hong Kong probably will face actions from HKICPA. "Certified Public Accountant" in Hong Kong means a professional accountant registered as such by virtue of section 24(1) and holding a practising certificate.

Individual CPAs who are licensed by the PAO to sign-off audited reports for financial statements of Limited Companies under Companies Ordinance would be known as Certified Public Accountant (Practising) (CPA(Practising)). To make it more confusing, there are no restriction for CPA(Practising) to call themselves simply as CPA. This "Practising" title appears to be similar in meaning as a "Registered Auditor" (R.A.) in some countries and is seen to be a form of (and the only) professional speciality.

From 1972 to 2004, all Professional Accountants in Hong Kong would call themselves either "AHKSA" (Associate member of HKSA) or "FHKSA" (Fellow member of HKSA). The individuals who were then licensed to sign-off audit reports were known as Certified Public Accountant or Public Accountants ("CPA or PA") prior to September 2004. These peculiar terms appears to be unique in Hong Kong, and has created confusion for the rest of the professions around the world, and even some accountants themselves, as to what AHKSA is. There were accounts for lay persons who cannot differentiate the differences among AHKSA, AIA and ACCA.

All the CPA and CPA(Practising) need to pass a set of examinations designated by the HKICPA. CPAs(Practising), in particular, have to go through more rigorous examinations and have to demonstrate that he is competent in local taxation and audits.

== Removal of requirement for a qualified accountant in the Listing Rules of Hong Kong ==
In November 2008, the Stock Exchange of Hong Kong Limited has removed the requirement for a qualified accountant from the Listing Rules but expanded the Code Provisions in the Code on Corporate Governance Practices regarding internal controls to make specific references to the responsibility of the directors to conduct an annual review of the adequacy of staffing of the financial reporting function and the oversight role of the audit committee.

== Memberships and other Affiliations ==
Accountancy is a well established and sought after profession in Hong Kong. A functional constituency in the Legislative Council of Hong Kong is elected solely by professional accountants.

CPAs in Hong Kong enjoy cross-membership with other local and overseas professional bodies.

Local bodies relevant to accountancy:

- The Taxation Institution of Hong Kong (TIHK)
- The Society of Chinese Accountants and Auditors (SCAACPA)
- The Institute of Financial Planners of Hong Kong (IFPHK)
- IT Accountants Association (ITAA)

Overseas bodies as HKICPA/CPA equivalent under Professional Accountants Ordinance are:

- Association of Chartered Certified Accountants (ACCA)
- American Institute of Certified Public Accountants (AICPA)
- Association of International Accountants (AIA)
- Canadian Institute of Chartered Accountants (CICA)
- The Chinese Institute of Certified Public Accountants (CICPA)
- Chartered Institute of Management Accountants (CIMA)
- Chartered Institute of Public Finance and Accountancy (CIPFA) *
- CPA Australia (CPAA)
- Institute of Chartered Accountants in Australia (ICAA)
- Institute of Chartered Accountants in England and Wales (ICAEW)
- Institute of Chartered Accountants in Ireland (ICAI)
- New Zealand Institute of Chartered Accountants (NZICA)
- Institute of Chartered Accountants of Scotland (ICAS)
- Institute of Chartered Accountants of Zimbabwe (ICAZ)
- South African Institute of Chartered Accountants (SAICA)

* Bodies not yet re-accredited since 2005

== Accounting education in Hong Kong ==
The accounting education in Hong Kong started in the Department of Commerce and Business Studies of the Hong Kong Technical College (currently Hong Kong Polytechnic University in the 1960s under the leadership of Leslie Wah-Leung Chung (鍾華亮). This college trained a generation of accountants for Hong Kong. The graduates were/are among the most prominent accountants in Hong Kong. Currently, the accounting education in Hong Kong is provided by the various universities in Hong Kong.
