= Stephen Sui =

Hong Kong civil servant and government official

Stephen Sui Wai-keung GBS, JP
- 蕭偉強

Secretary for Labour and Welfare
- In office 13 February 2017 – 30 June 2017
- Chief Executive: Leung Chun-ying
- Preceded by: Matthew Cheung
- Succeeded by: Law Chi-kwong

Personal details
- Born: December 24, 1956 (age 69)
- Education: University of Hong Kong

Stephen Sui Wai-keung GBS, JP (Chinese: 蕭偉強; born 24 December 1956) is a Hong Kong civil servant and government official. He is the former Secretary for Labour and Welfare of the Hong Kong SAR government.

== Biography ==
He was graduated from the University of Hong Kong with a Bachelor of Arts degree and a Master of Public Administration degree. He joined the government as executive officer in 1978 and rose to the rank to senior principal executive officer in 2010. He served in various bureaux and departments including the Land Registry, the former Urban Services Department, the Civil Service Bureau, the Department of Justice and the Commissioner for Rehabilitation, responsible for the overall co-ordination of the rehabilitation policies and initiatives for persons with disabilities.

He was appointed Under Secretary for Labour and Welfare under Matthew Cheung in 2014. After Cheung took over as Chief Secretary for Administration, he acted as Secretary for Labour and Welfare. His appointment was confirmed by the State Council of the People's Republic of China on 13 February 2017.

Political offices
Preceded by Matthew Cheung	Secretary for Labour and Welfare; 2017	Succeeded by Law Chi-kwong
