= Labour and Welfare Bureau =

Policy bureau of the Hong Kong Government

- 勞工及福利局
- Emblem of the Hong Kong SAR

Agency overview
- Formed: 2007
- Headquarters: 10 & 11//F, West Wing, Central Government Offices, 2 Tim Mei Avenue, Tamar, Hong Kong
- Ministers responsible: Chris Sun, Secretary for Labour and Welfare; Ho Kai-ming, Under Secretary for Labour and Welfare
- Agency executive: Alice Lau, Permanent Secretary for Labour and Welfare
- Child agencies: Labour Department; Social Welfare Department; Working Family and Student Financial Assistance Agency
- Website: http://www.lwb.gov.hk

Labour and Welfare Bureau
- Traditional Chinese: 勞工及福利局
- Simplified Chinese: 劳工及福利局
Transcriptions
Standard Mandarin
- Hanyu Pinyin: Láogōng jí Fúlì Jú
Yue: Cantonese
- Yale Romanization: Lòuh gūng kahp fūk leih gihk
- Jyutping: Lou4 gung1 kap6 fuk1 lei6 guk6

The Labour and Welfare Bureau (Chinese: 勞工及福利局) is a policy bureau of the Government of Hong Kong responsible for employment, labor-development, manpower, human resources management, poverty-reduction, and social welfare in Hong Kong.

The bureau is managed by the Secretary for Labour and Welfare.

== Subordinate departments ==
The following public entities are managed by the bureau:

- Labour Department
- Social Welfare Department
- Working Family and Student Financial Assistance Agency

== History ==
In September 2022, the Bureau asked that more than 100 schools and institutions under the Continuing Education Fund (CEF) must safeguard national security.

== See also ==
- Hong Kong Disciplined Services
