= Director of Audit =

The Director of Audit (審計署署長) is a public office in Hong Kong, established to ensure the financial order of the Hong Kong Government and head the Audit Commission of Hong Kong. This role is similar to that of auditors general or auditors in other jurisdictions. The director reports directly to the Chief Executive of Hong Kong.

== List of directors in Hong Kong SAR ==
The current and 5th Director of Audit is Nelson Lam Chi-yuen, having assumed the role in July 2022.

Hong Kong Special Administrative Region
#	Name	Took office	Left office
Name of the office: Director of Audit
1	Dominic Chan Yin-tat, SBS	1997	2003
2	Benjamin Tang Kwok-bun, GBS	2003	2012
3	David Sun Tak-kei, GBS	2012	2018
4	John Chu Nai-cheung, JP	2018	2022
5	Nelson Lam Chi-yuen, JP	2022	Incumbent

== List of directors in British Hong Kong (pre-1997) ==
British Hong Kong (pre-1997 era)
#	Name	Took office	Left office
Name of the office: Auditor General
1	Adolphus Edward Shelley	1844	1846
2	Lieut-Col William Caine	1846	1854
3	William Thomas Mercer	1854	1858
4	William Hepburn Rennie	1858	1870
5	John Gardiner Austin	1870	1879
6	William Henry Marsh, CMG	1879	1887
7	Frederick Stewart	1887	1889
Name of the office: Auditor
8	Hilgrove Clement Nicolle	1890	1904
9	Hugh Richard Phelips	1904	1930
10	Percival Lorimer Collision, OBE	1930	1938
11	Arnold Pollard	1938	1948
Name of the office: Director of Audit
12	Percival Henry Jennings, CBE	1948	1955
13	Frank Ernest Lovell Carter, CBE	1955	1959
14	William John Dupre Cooper, CBE	1959	1965
15	Denis George Briton, OBE	1965	1970
16	Percy Thomas Warr	1970	1975
17	Gordon Evershed Lyth, OBE	1975	1982
18	Norman Bertram Stalker, OBE	1982	1988
19	Robert Jeffrey Hutt, OBE	1988	1992
20	Brian George Jenney, OBE	1992	1995
21	Dominic Chan Yin-tat, SBS	1995	1997
