= David Sun (Hong Kong) =

Hong Kong accountant and former government official

David Sun Tak-kei GBS, JP
- 孫德基
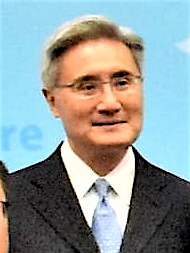

3rd Director of Audit
- In office 1 July 2012 – 31 December 2018
- Preceded by: Benjamin Tang
- Succeeded by: John Chu

Personal details
- Born: David Sun Tak-kei; 1953 (age 72–73)

David Sun Tak-kei, GBS, JP (Chinese: 孫德基, born 1953) was Director of Audit of Hong Kong, a "principal official" position, between 2012 and 2018, and was the president of the Hong Kong Institute of Certified Public Accountants between 2003 and 2007 (Hong Kong Society of Accountants before 8 September 2004).

He currently serves as Chairman of the Accounting and Financial Reporting Council.

== Background ==
Sun began his career at Ernst & Young in 1977 after receiving his Master of Accountancy degree from the University of Illinois at Urbana-Champaign in 1977 and was the Far East Co-Area Managing Partner until his retirement in 2010. He was the partner in charge of the Akai Holdings account from 1991 to 1999.

Sun was a member of Securities and Futures Commission between 2001 and 2007. In 2003, he became the president of the Hong Kong Institute of Certified Public Accountants (HKICPA) and served until 2007. He was also a member of chairman council of the City University of Hong Kong from April to July 2012. Sun was later appointed as Director of Audit of Hong Kong in July 2012. He retired in December 2018.

== Controversies ==
When Akai went bust in 2000, the liquidators accused Ernst &Young of falsifying documents and tampering with audit documents between 1994 and 1998 to cover up the theft of over US$800m by Akai's chairman, James Ting. Ting was imprisoned for false accounting in 2005, and Ernst &Young paid $200m to settle the negligence case out of court in September 2009. In a separate lawsuit a former Ernst &Young partner, Cristopher Ho, made a "substantial payment" to Akai creditors in his role as chairman of the company that had bought Akai just before it went bust in 2000. By this time Sun was co-managing partner for Ernst &Young China; in January 2010 Ernst &Young settled another claim in relation to the bankrupt Moulin Global Eyecare, an audit client between 2002 and 2004 whose accounts were described by the liquidator as a "morass of dodginess".

Government offices
Preceded by Benjamin Tang	Director of Audit; 2012–2018	Succeeded by John Chu
