= Chris Sun =

Hong Kong civil servant (born 1971)

The Honourable Chris Sun JP
- 孫玉菡
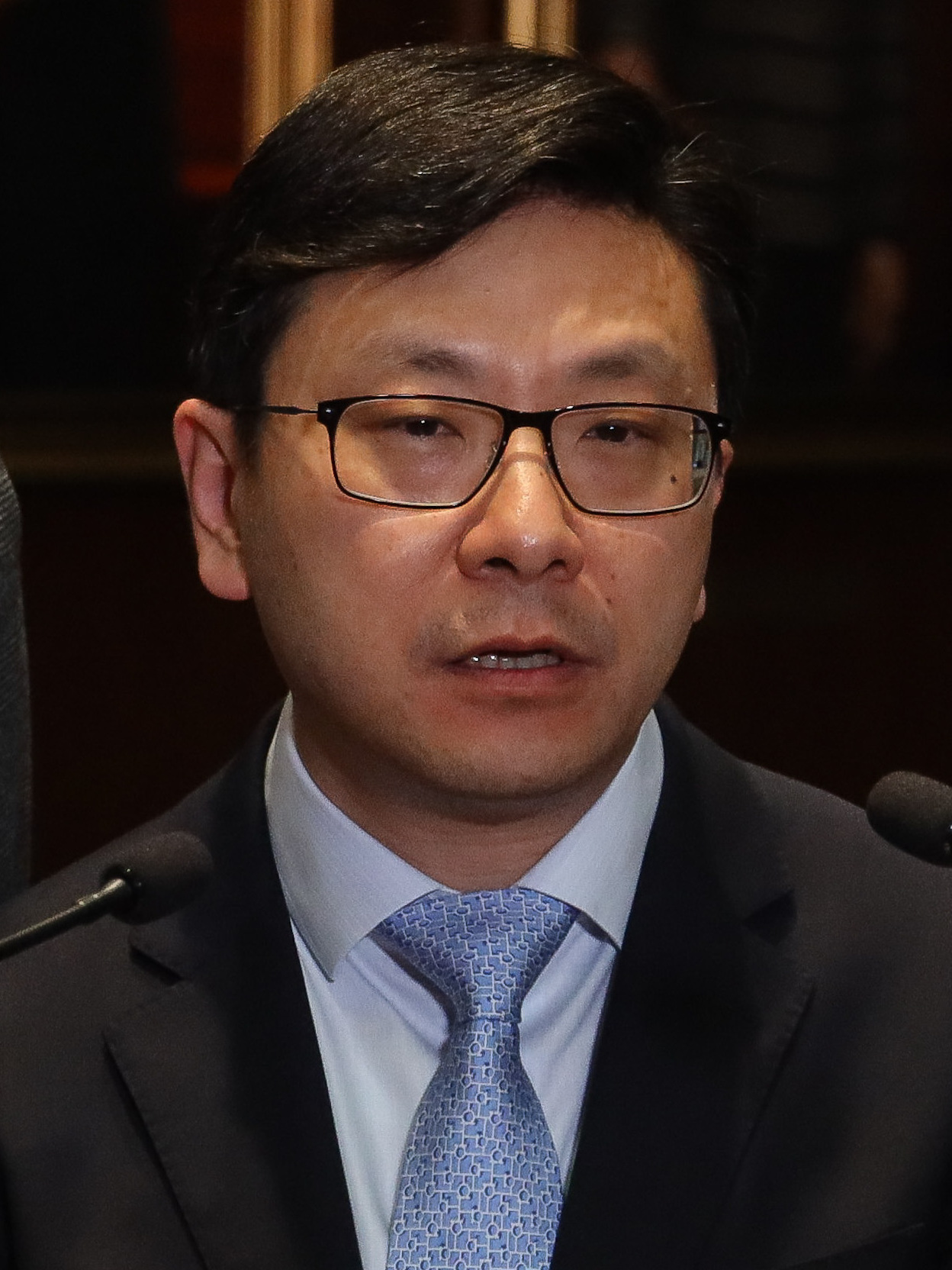
- Sun in 2023

Secretary for Labour and Welfare
- Incumbent
- Assumed office 1 July 2022
- Preceded by: Law Chi-kwong

Commissioner for Labour
- In office 21 December 2020 – 31 June 2022
- Preceded by: Carlson Chan Ka-shun
- Succeeded by: May Chan Wing-shiu

Personal details
- Born: 28 December 1971 (age 54) Shandong, China
- Citizenship: Chinese

Chris Sun Yuk-han (Chinese: 孫玉菡, born 28 December 1971) is a Hong Kong civil servant who serves as the current Secretary for Labour and Welfare in Hong Kong, appointed on 1 July 2022 as part of John Lee's administration.

== Early life and education ==
Sun Yuk-han was born on 28 December 1971 in Shandong. He moved to Hong Kong on 15 September 1978 and attended Pui Kiu Primary School.

== Career ==
Sun joined the Colonial Administrative Service in 1994, and was appointed the Deputy Secretary for Food and Health (Health) in 2011, the Deputy Secretary for Financial Services and the Treasury (Financial Services) in 2017, and the Commissioner for Labour in 2020.

=== Secretary for Labour and Welfare ===
In July 2022, Sun attended a seminar to "learn and promote" the spirit of Xi Jinping's important speech.

On 21 October 2022, after Lee had said 140,000 people had left the workforce in the past 2 years, with about two-thirds of them highly skilled, Sun said it didn't necessarily mean they had moved overseas, but did not elaborate. Lee previously rejected the use of the term "emigration wave" when describing the change in population. The emigration wave has been attributed to the government's strict COVID-19 policies and the political situation in Hong Kong.

Also on 21 October 2022, after Lee announced in his maiden policy address plans to try to attract worldwide talents to Hong Kong, Sun publicly criticized a Ming Pao newspaper cartoon that depicted a bulletin board advertisement which "urgently" sought for "world-class talents" to come to Hong Kong, with those who were "accepting of strict governance" being given priority. Sun said the cartoon was "absurd and a serious deviation from the truth" and "Such self-righteous humour will only damage Hong Kong's image."

On 24 October 2022, Sun said that there was no need to compare Hong Kong to Singapore for talent acquisition, and that Hong Kong's talent loss was attributed to the COVID-19 pandemic.

In November 2022, Sun said that he was confident that the government would be able to attract foreign talent under Lee's policy address, saying "From next year onwards until 2025, we should be able to attract at least every year 35,000 talents to fill the gap in the local market."

In December 2022, Sun rejected calls from lawmakers who said that the government should set up a committee to come up with a population policy, with lawmaker Simon Lee saying that Sun was reacting passively to the problem of decreased birth rates and a shrinking workforce population in Hong Kong. At the same month, he was tested positive for COVID-19.

In January 2023, Sun said that government figures that show approximately 25% of people in Hong Kong being under the poverty line was "flawed" and did not give a full picture of the situation.

==== Top Talent Pass Scheme ====
In February 2023, Sun revealed that the Top Talent Pass Scheme had approximately two thirds of all applicants come from mainland China. Most of the rest of the "overseas" applicants still hold a mainland Chinese passport; sources estimated that up to 95% of all applicants have a mainland Chinese passport. The program was announced in October 2022, with a "global drive". In April 2023, Director of Immigration Au Ka-wang confirmed that 95% of all applicants were mainland Chinese, with only 3% of applicants coming from Canada, Australia, the United States, and Singapore. In April 2023, Sun also commented that the program was popular among "foreign talent." SCMP reported that 95% of approvals were also given to mainland Chinese. On 30 June 2023, local media also confirmed that 95% of approvals were given to mainland Chinese; when asked about if the program was unattractive to foreigners, Sun said mainland Chinese "knew better about Hong Kong."

After He Jiankui, a formerly jailed mainland Chinese citizen, was approved for the Top Talent Pass Scheme, Sun acknowledged that applicants do not need to declare their criminal history. Being asked by reporters about the case, Sun said that he would not make comments on individual cases, as this would "not [be] appropriate" for him. He Jiankui also said that despite being approved for the visa, he had no plans to move to Hong Kong. After the incident, the government said that future applicants must declare their past criminal records.

After multiple posts on mainland Chinese online platforms discussed using the visa to give birth to children in Hong Kong, which would give benefits such as right of abode and permanent residency to the children, government authorities warned that mainland Chinese women should not misuse the visa to give birth in Hong Kong.

In July 2023, Sun announced that the government would consider allowing graduates from mainland Chinese universities which were not ranked in the top 100 to apply for the program.

In September 2023, SCMP reported that out of five visas schemes to work in Hong Kong, more than 90% of those approved were from mainland China. Some industry experts, including the CEO of the Hong Kong General Chamber of Commerce, warned that more talent from outside of China was needed to maintain Hong Kong's international status, diversity, and creativity.

In October 2023, local media interviewed approved Top Talent Pass Scheme visa holders, with some saying they did not plan to move to Hong Kong, and instead would use the visa as a backup option. Other applicants have said that they would use the visa to travel to Hong Kong to eat and shop, rather than to work there.

In June 2024, SCMP reported that users of Xiaohongshu claimed that Top Talent Pass Scheme visa holders could become insurance agents to show proof of work to extend their visas.

==== New Capital Investment Entrant Scheme (New CIES) ====
The launch of the New Capital Investment Entrant Scheme on 1 March 2024 required that applicants be non-mainland Chinese nationals (foreign nationals), Macau residents, Taiwan residents, or mainland Chinese nationals with permanent residency in a foreign country. It was revealed that 76% of the 251 applicants were mainland Chinese nationals with permanent residency in Vanuatu and Guinea-Bissau. One online commentator said that the reason behind so many applications from Vanuatu and Guinea-Bissau was because permanent residency could be purchased for "only 20,000 Renminbi".

Previously, in 2008, another Hong Kong visa scheme saw 456 out of 1,100 applicants have permanent residency from Gambia and Guinea-Bissau. In 2014, a separate report noted that mainland Chinese would purchase permanent residency from African countries to become eligible for another Hong Kong visa scheme.

From 2005 to 2014, a similar program had 22,680 out of 25,213 applicants from mainland China with permanent residency mostly from Gambia, Guinea Bissau and Vanuatu.

==== Importation of foreign labour ====
In June 2023, the government announced that 20,000 workers would be hired from outside of Hong Kong; both pro-Beijing and pro-democracy groups criticized the plan, saying the government was "circumventing" the Labour Advisory Board, with one group saying that the "government intentionally bypassed the existing mechanism for importing labour." After a meeting with the government, a representative of the Hong Kong Federation of Trade Unions said that the government had decided to "announce first, consult later" and "completely disrespected" the members' opinions.
