= Convoy Global Holdings =

Convoy Global Holdings Limited
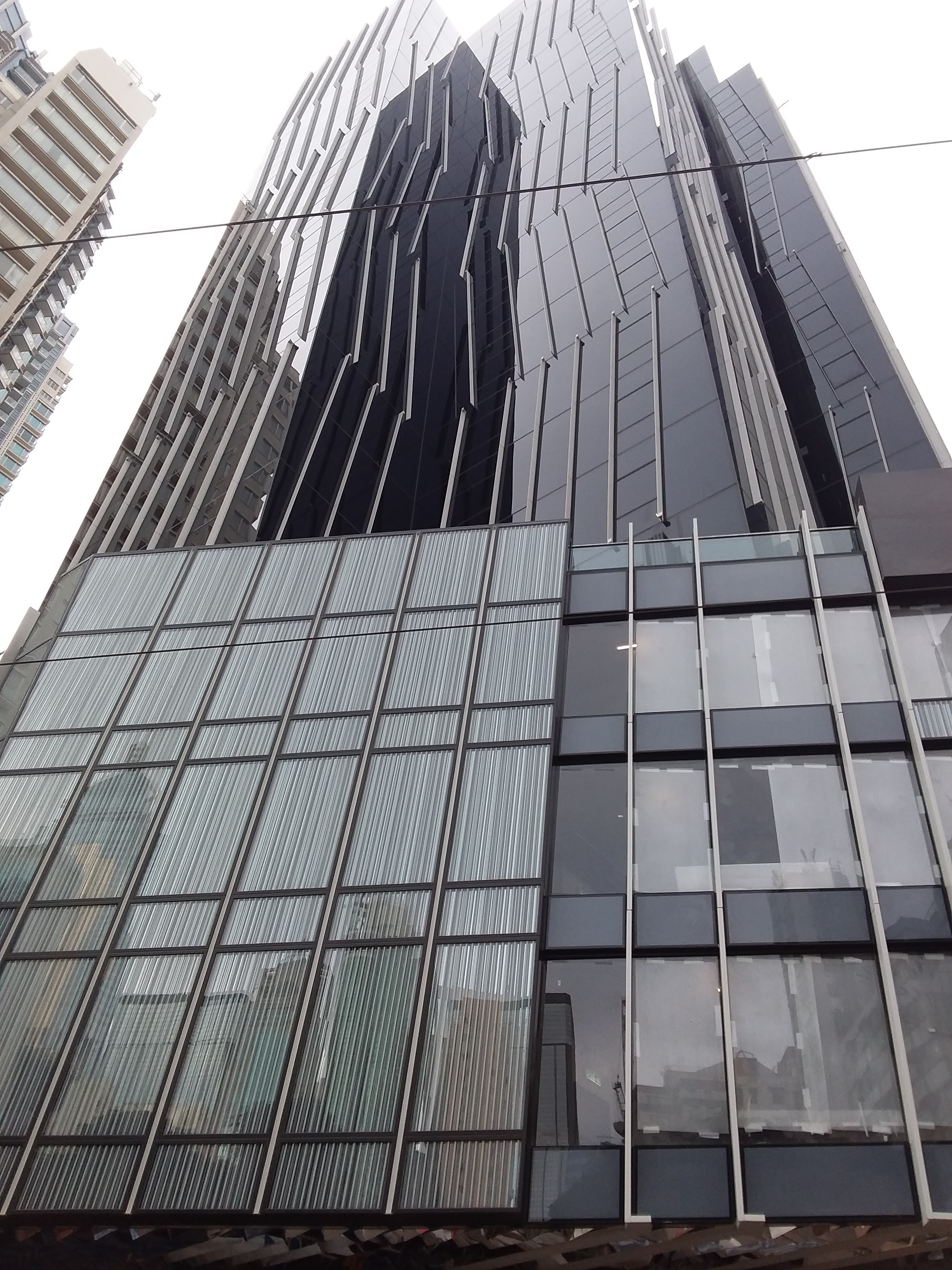
- Headquarters in Wan Chai
- Native name: 康宏環球控股有限公司
- Type: Public
- Traded as: SEHK: 1019 (formerly)
- Industry: Financial services
- Founded: 1993; 33 years ago
- Headquarters: Wan Chai, Hong Kong
- Website: www.convoy.com.hk

Convoy Global Holdings Limited (Chinese: 康宏環球控股有限公司, SEHK: 1019) is a member of Convoy Financial Group. Through its wholly owned subsidiary, Convoy Financial Services Limited (Chinese: 康宏理財服務有限公司) which provides financial planning services, risk management, retirement planning and estate planning. It is the largest independent insurance and MPF schemes brokerage firm in Hong Kong in terms of number of consultants. Convoy Financial Services Limited is both a member of Professional Insurance Brokers Association and is registered as a Mandatory Provident Fund Corporate Intermediary under the Mandatory Provident Fund Schemes Authority.

In Greater China Region, Convoy Global establishes subsidiaries and joint ventures in Beijing and Shenzhen, providing services including but not limited to life and general insurance, risk management consultancy, reinsurance broking, as well as insurance and investment planning consultancy in company level.

== History ==
Convoy Global Holdings Limited ("Convoy Global") established in 1993. Its subsidiary, Convoy Financial Services Limited ("Convoy Financial") positioned as a financial advisory firm and launched financial planning service in 1998. Convoy Global was listed on the Hong Kong Stock Exchange in 2010, and Launched an online insurance platform – iConvoy in 2012. In 2016, it renamed as "Convoy Global Holdings Limited". In 2018, it underwent corporate renewal, refocus on three core retail business streams: financial advisory, product manufacturing and FinTech. On 9 July 2015, Convoy Global announced that it had place 3.294 billion shares of new share to Fubon's Richard Tsai and his family-controlled Eagle Legacy Limited and Oceana Glory Limited at a price of $0.53 per share, fundraised a net amount of HKD 1.68 billion. The shares accounted of 29.85% of the issued share capital of the Company as enlarged by the allotment and issue of the Subscription Shares, making Richard Tsai and his family largest single shareholder of Convoy Global. In November 2017, Kaisa Group Holdings LTD (1638) largest shareholder and chairman Kowk Ying-shing's son Kwok Hiu-kwan currently owns 4,448,180,000 shares, equivalent to 29.91% of equity, becoming the second largest shareholder. On 7 December 2017, the Securities and Futures Commission (SFC) and Independent Commission Against Corruption (ICAC) made joint investigation and a raid of Convoy Global's office, on the alleged corruption of the company's share trading and lending activities. The deputy chairwoman and executive director of financial advisers, Rosetta Fong Sut-Sam and executive director, Christie Chan Lai-yee were arrested. The company has also applied for suspension of its shares on the morning of that day. On 8 December 2017, chairman Quincy Wong Lee-man was arrested by ICAC. On 10 December 2017, Convoy Global announced the appointment of Johnny Chen as the new interim Chairman of the Board and Executive Director, and Yap E-hock and Ip Yee-kwan as Executive Directors, which took effect from 9 December 2017.

== Group companies ==
• Convoy Financial Services Limited
• Convoy Financial Solutions Limited
• OnePlatform Asset Management Limited
• OnePlatform International Property Consulting Company Limited
• OnePlatform Securities Limited
• Hong Kong Credit Corporation Limited
• Convoy Insurance Brokers (Macau) Limited

== Rebranding ==
Convoy launched their rebranding campaign in 2018. On 27 April, they unveiled a new logo.

Convoy also launch a large-scale publicity campaign for their rebranding to promote the new corporate image.

== Financial scandal ==
On 7 December 2017, the Securities and Futures Commission has for first time joined hands with the Independent Commission Against Corruption. Sources told that some employees were suspected of using the Hong Kong-based company to solicit an advantage of about HK$47 million between March and June 2015. The deputy chairwoman and executive director of financial advisers, Rosetta Fong Sut-Sam and executive director Christie Chan Lai-yee were arrested by Independent Commission Against Corruption (ICAC), the ICAC officers also searched Convoy's head office. The shares had fallen 7.2 per cent to 16.7 HK cents. A former Convoy chief executive and current chairman of Lerado Financial Group, Mark Mak Kwong-yiu was also arrested. The SFC and the ICAC also intend to meet with another Convoy executive director Cho Kwai-chee, who is the founder and vice-chairman of clinic operator Town Health International Medical Group. Convoy chairman Quincy Wong Lee-man was arrested by ICAC after coming back from Taiwan on 8 December 2017.
