= Law Chi-kwong =

Hong Kong politician

Dr The Honorable Law Chi-kwong GBS, JP
- 羅致光
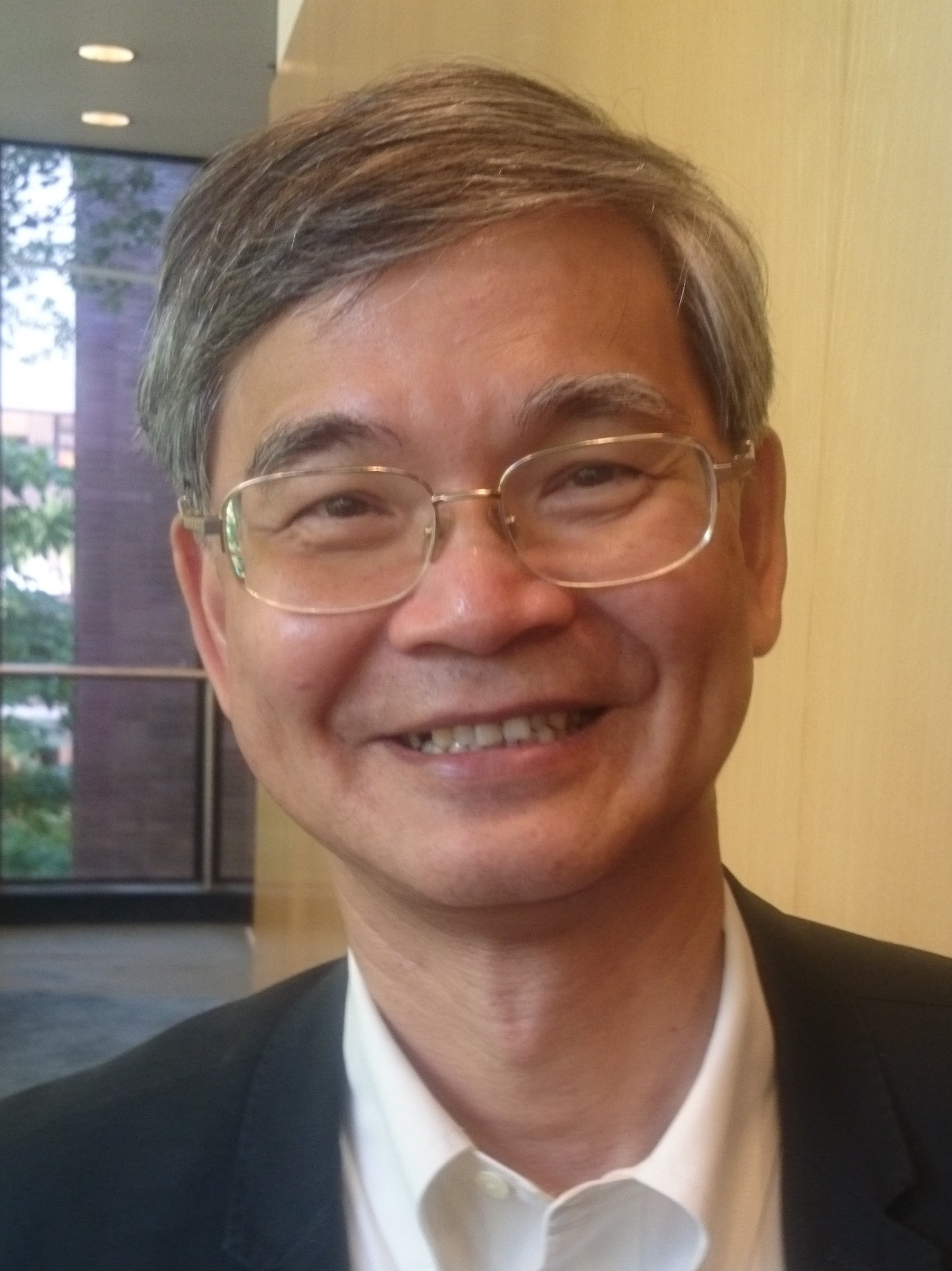

Secretary for Labour and Welfare
- In office 1 July 2017 – 30 June 2022
- Chief Executive: Carrie Lam
- Preceded by: Stephen Sui
- Succeeded by: Chris Sun

Member of the Legislative Council
- In office 1 July 1998 – 30 September 2004
- Preceded by: New parliament
- Succeeded by: Fernando Cheung
- Constituency: Social Welfare
- In office 11 October 1995 – 30 June 1997
- Preceded by: Hui Yin-fat
- Succeeded by: None (Replaced by Provisional Legislative Council)
- Constituency: Social Welfare

Personal details
- Born: 1 November 1953 (age 72) British Hong Kong
- Party: United Democrats (1990–1994); Democratic Party (1994–2017)
- Education: King's College, Hong Kong; University of Hong Kong; University of California, Los Angeles
- Occupation: Associate Professor

Dr Law Chi-kwong, GBS, JP (traditional Chinese: 羅致光; simplified Chinese: 罗致光; born 1 November 1953) is a Hong Kong politician who served as Secretary for Labour and Welfare between 2017 and 2022. He is an associate professor in social work at the University of Hong Kong.

He was a founding member of the Democratic Party of Hong Kong and its honorary secretary and spokesperson for women's issues, until he left the party to serve in the government.

He served in the Legislative Council, in the Social Welfare functional constituency, between 1995 and 2004 except during the Provisional Legislative Council, serving on the Social Welfare Advisory Committee as well as many governmental and non-governmental bodies.

In 2014, he was awarded the Gold Bauhinia Star by the government.

== Education and academic career ==
Law studied for his bachelor's degree in economics and statistics and a master's degree in social work at the University of Hong Kong. He went on to earn an MBA at the Chinese University of Hong Kong and a doctorate in social welfare from the University of California, in Los Angeles.

In 1981, he took up a teaching role in the Department of Social Work and Social Administration at the University of Hong Kong, and has remained on the staff since. From 1993 to 1997, he was head of department. His current position is associate professor.

Law has been chairman of the Senior Citizen Home Safety Association and an executive member of the Hong Kong Council of Social Service. He has also been a board member of the Hong Kong Social Workers Association.

== Political career ==
Law was elected to the Legislative Council in the Social Welfare constituency, in 1995, 1998 and 2000, thus serving from 1995 to 2004, except for one year of the Provisional Legislative Council.

He has served on the Commission on Strategic Development since 2005, and the Steering Committee on Child Development Fund since 2008. He has been a member of the Land and Development Advisory Committee since 2009, and a member of the Commission on Poverty since 2012.

In 2017, he was nominated by Carrie Lam to serve as Secretary for Labour and Welfare. He withdrew from the Democratic Party prior to his appointment, because the party bars its members from serving in a government chosen by the pro-Beijing camp.

In the 1990s, Law was one the "best-known advocates for democracy and the rule of law," but later switched his position to be pro-Beijing, avoiding inquiries about his change of opinion.

In February 2022, Law claimed that fundraising to help domestic helpers who had been fined by the government for social gathering could be illegal.

== Personal life ==
Law is divorced and has a daughter and a son.

Legislative Council of Hong Kong
Preceded by Hui Yin-fat	Member of Legislative Council; Representative for Social Welfare; 1995–1997	Replaced by Provisional Legislative Council
New parliament	Member of Legislative Council; Representative for Social Welfare; 1998–2004	Succeeded by Fernando Cheung
Party political offices
Preceded by Albert Ho; Yeung Sum	Vice Chairperson of Democratic Party; 2000–2002; With: Lee Wing-tat	Succeeded by Albert Ho
Political offices
Preceded by Stephen Sui	Secretary for Labour and Welfare; 2017–2022	Succeeded by Chris Sun
