= Matthew Cheung =

Hong Kong politician

The Honourable Matthew Cheung Kin-chung GBM GBS JP
- 張建宗
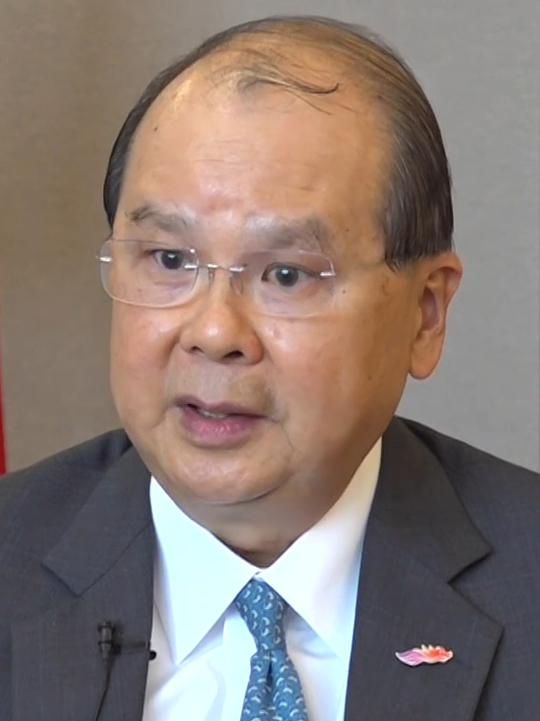
- Cheung in 2020

7th Chief Secretary for Administration
- In office 16 January 2017 – 25 June 2021; Acting: 13 January 2017 – 16 January 2017
- Chief Executive: Leung Chun-ying; Carrie Lam
- Preceded by: Carrie Lam
- Succeeded by: John Lee

Secretary for Labour and Welfare
- In office 1 July 2007 – 16 January 2017
- Preceded by: York Chow (Secretary for Health, Welfare and Food); Stephen Ip (Secretary for Economic Development and Labour)
- Succeeded by: Stephen Sui

Personal details
- Born: November 20, 1950 (age 75) British Hong Kong
- Education: University of Hong Kong
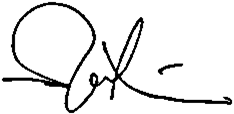
- Signature

Matthew Cheung Kin-chung GBM GBS JP (Chinese: 張建宗; born 20 November 1950) is a former Hong Kong politician who served as Chief Secretary for Administration from 2017 to 2021. Cheung previously served as the Secretary for Labour and Welfare for ten years. He was awarded the Grand Bauhinia Medal (GBM) by the Hong Kong SAR Government in 2017.

== Biography ==
Cheung was born in Hong Kong in 1950. He graduated from the University of Hong Kong in 1972, then became an Information Officer for British colonial government. During the Vietnamese refugee crisis of the 1970s, he was responsible for arranging visits for foreign media to the refugee camps. He was transferred to the Administrative Service in September 1979 and has served in various bureaus and departments in the government.

During his earlier years of service, he served in the Finance Branch, Home Affairs Department, City and New Territories Administration, Government House and the Industry Department. As a directorate officer since 1986, Cheung served as District Officer of North District, Assistant Director-General of Trade, Administrative Assistant to the Financial Secretary, Deputy Judiciary Administrator, and Deputy Head of Central Policy Unit.

He was promoted to Deputy Secretary for Education and Manpower (1996–1999), Commissioner for Labour (1999–2000), Director of Education (2000–2002), and Permanent Secretary for Economic Development and Labour (later known as Permanent Secretary for Economic Development/Commissioner for Labour; 2002–2007). He was promoted to Administrative Officer Staff Grade A1 in September 2004. Cheung was known for his hardworking style, having taken less than three weeks off in the five years leading up to his retirement in March 2007 as Permanent Secretary for Economic Development and Labour.

In July 2007, he was appointed Secretary for Labour and Welfare, one of the principal officials. During his tenure, he oversaw the minimum wage legislation and Work Incentive Transport Subsidy Scheme introduced in 2011. He also tackled issues such as the Old Age Living Allowance, standard working hours and paternity leave, all of which are still fiercely debated over by unionists and employers with opposing views. He was criticised for his low profile during the 2013 Hong Kong dock strike. He was also criticised for only taking orders from his superiors and not taking responsibility for decisions.

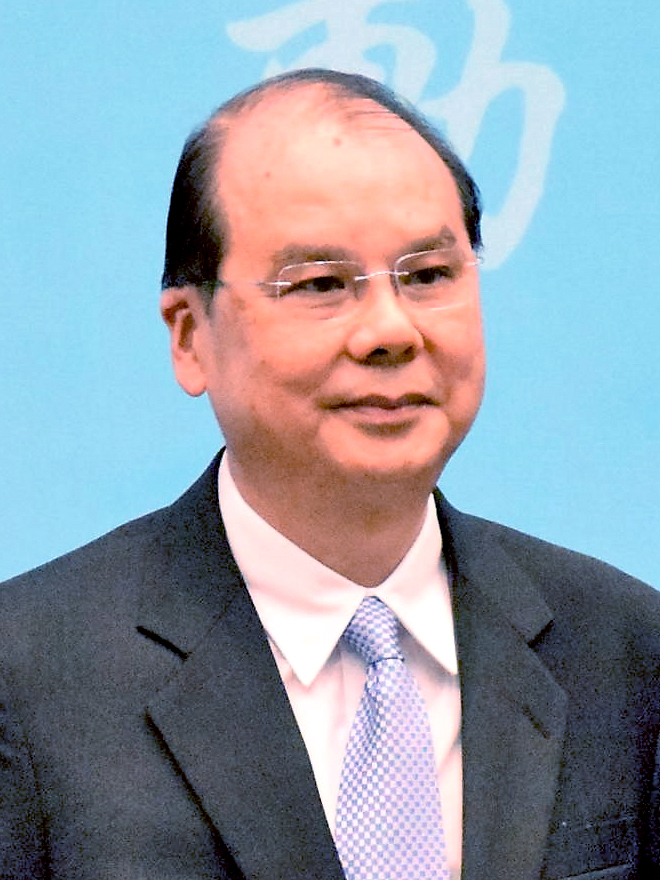
Cheung became Chief Secretary for Administration, the number 2 government official, in 2017

In January 2017, he became the Chief Secretary for Administration, replacing Carrie Lam.

On September 1, 2019 in the midst of protests against the government of Hong Kong he wrote that "Schools are places for learning, and are absolutely not places for expressing political views or demands."

In October 2020, Cheung stated that the government will not allow schools to become "breeding grounds" for Hong Kong independence, and that the Education Bureau must protect students from those "twisted and illegal" ideas. In addition, Cheung said that teachers should train students to become "responsible and good citizens and nationals, who contribute to the long-term stability of the country and the community."

In November 2020, following the expulsion of 4 pro-democracy lawmakers from the Legislative Council, Cheung said that the decision was "constitutional, legal and reasonable."

Also in November 2020, after multiple lawmakers were caught sleeping or distracted during Carrie Lam's annual Policy Address, Cheung downplayed the situation and said it was only "one or two out of 40 or 50 people there."

On 17 January 2021, Cheung wrote a blog post justifying the requirement that civil servants sign an oath to pledge loyalty to the government, stating that it would make the civil servants demonstrate their loyalties and commitments.

In March 2021, Cheung claimed that steps to have only "patriots" serve in the government would make the city more democratic and "enhance the quality of democracy here." Cheung also claimed that the approved changes to the Legislative Council would better represent the public. In April 2021, Cheung briefed Legislative Council members on the changes, and asked for them to brief other people in the community on the "improvements" to the system.

In June 2021, Cheung retired from public service.

Government offices
| Preceded by Jacqueline Willis | Commissioner of Labour; 1999–2000 | Succeeded by Pamela Tan |
| Preceded by Fanny Law | Director of Education; 2000–2002 | Succeeded by Arthur Li as Secretary for Education and Manpower |
| Preceded by Pamela Tan | Commissioner of Labour; 2002–2007 | Succeeded by Paul Tang |
Political offices
| Preceded by York Chow as Secretary for Health, Welfare and Food | Secretary for Labour and Welfare; 2007–2017 | Succeeded by Stephen Sui |
| Preceded by Stephen Ip as Secretary for Economic Development and Labour | Secretary for Labour and Welfare; 2007–2017 | Succeeded by Stephen Sui |
| Preceded by Carrie Lam | Chief Secretary for Administration; 2017–2021 | Succeeded by John Lee |
