= Secretary for Labour and Welfare =

Hong Kong Special Administrative Region Secretary for Labour and Welfare 勞工及福利局局長
- Emblem of Hong Kong

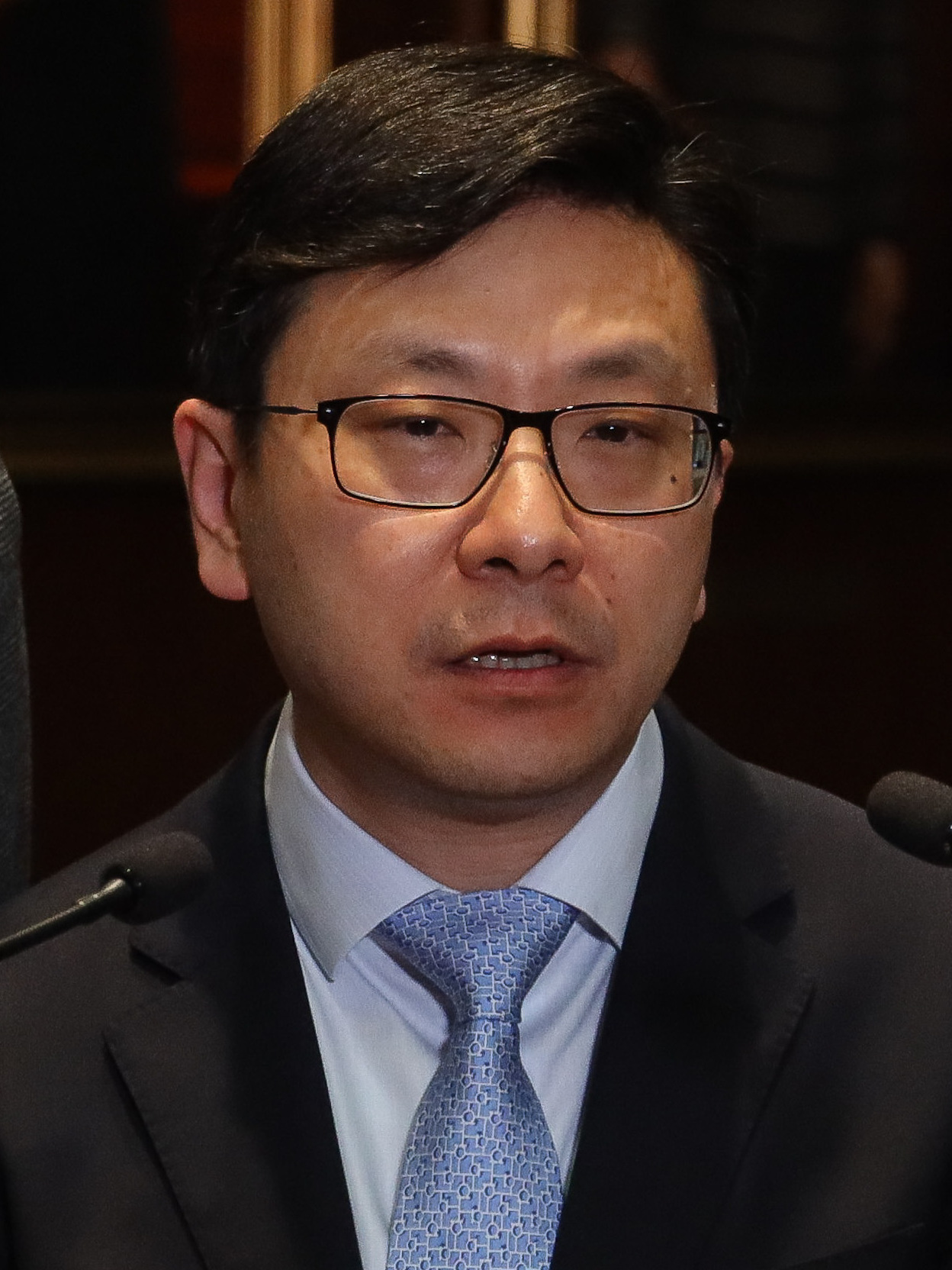
- Incumbent; Chris Sun since 1 July 2022
- Labour and Welfare Bureau
- Style: The Honourable
- Appointer: Central People's Government nomination by Chief Executive
- Inaugural holder: Matthew Cheung
- Formation: 1 July 2007
- Salary: HK$4,021,200 per annum
- Website: LWB

Secretary for Labour and Welfare
- Traditional Chinese: 勞工及福利局局長
Transcriptions
Yue: Cantonese
- Yale Romanization: Lòuh gūng kahp fūk leih guhk guhk jéung
- Jyutping: Lou^{4} gung^{1} kap^{6} fuk^{1} lei^{6} guk^{6} guk^{6} zoeng^{2}

The Secretary for Labour and Welfare (Chinese: 勞工及福利局局長) of the Hong Kong Government is responsible for labour and social welfare policy in Hong Kong. The position was created in 2007 to replace portions of the previous portfolio of Secretary for Economic Development and Labour and welfare portion from Secretary for Food and Health.

Labour affairs were handled by different ministers before the creation of this position:

- Secretary for Social Services before 1983;
- Secretary for Education and Manpower between 1983 and 2002;
- Secretary for Economic Development and Labour between 2002 and 2007.

Welfare affairs were included in the portfolio of:

- Secretary for Social Services before 1983;
- Secretary for Health and Welfare between 1983 and 2002;
- Secretary for Health, Welfare and Food between 2002 and 2007.

== List of office holders ==
Political party: Nonpartisan

No.	Portrait	Name	Term of office		Duration	Chief Executive	Term	Ref
1		Matthew Cheung Kin-chung 張建宗	1 July 2007	16 January 2017	9 years, 199 days	Donald Tsang (2005–2012)	3	
1		Matthew Cheung Kin-chung 張建宗	1 July 2007	16 January 2017	9 years, 199 days	Leung Chun-ying (2012–2017)	4	
2		Stephen Sui Wai-keung 蕭偉強	13 February 2017	30 June 2017	137 days	Leung Chun-ying (2012–2017)	4	
3		Law Chi-kwong 羅致光	1 July 2017	30 June 2022	5 years, 0 days	Carrie Lam (2017–2022)	5	
4		Chris Sun Yuk-han 孫玉菡	1 July 2022	Incumbent	4 years, 68 days	John Lee (2022–present)	6	
