= List of Hong Kong government agencies =

This is a list of government agencies of the Hong Kong Government.

The policies of the government are formulated decided by the bureaux led by secretaries and permanent secretaries are discussed in the Executive Council and implemented by the departments and agencies. Each department or agency reports to one or more policy bureaux, or directly to the Chief Executive, the Chief Secretary for Administration or Financial Secretary.

Following his re-election in 2007, Donald Tsang ordered a reorganisation of the Government Secretariat, increasing the number of policy bureaux to 12. This was further increased to 15 in 2022, upon the inauguration of the Lee government.

== Chief Executive ==
- Chief Executive: John Lee
- Office of the Chief Executive
- Independent Commission Against Corruption
- Audit Commission
- Policy Innovation and Co-ordination Office
- Public Service Commission
- Office of the Ombudsman
- Secretary for Justice
- Chief Secretary for Administration
- Financial Secretary

== Secretary for Justice ==
- Secretary for Justice: Paul Lam
- Deputy Secretary for Justice: Horace Cheung
- Department of Justice

== Chief Secretary for Administration ==
(“Department of Administration” per Article 60 of the Basic Law)

=== Chief Secretary for Administration’s Office ===
- Chief Secretary for Administration: Eric Chan
- Administration Wing
- Legal Aid Department

=== Civil Service Bureau ===
- Secretary for the Civil Service: Ingrid Yeung
- Permanent Secretary for the Civil Service: Clement Leung
- Joint Secretariat for the Advisory Bodies on Civil Service and Judicial Salaries and Conditions of Service (JSSCS)

=== Constitutional and Mainland Affairs Bureau ===
- Secretary for Constitutional and Mainland Affairs: Janice Tse
- Under Secretary for Constitutional & Mainland Affairs: Clement Woo
- Permanent Secretary for Constitutional and Mainland Affairs: Roy Tang
- Registration and Electoral Office
- Beijing Office
- Hong Kong Economic and Trade Offices (Mainland China, and Taiwan)

=== Education Bureau ===
- Secretary for Education: Christine Choi
- Under Secretary for Education: (vacant)
- Permanent Secretary for Education: Michelle Li
- Working Family and Student Financial Assistance Agency
- University Grants Committee Secretariat

=== Environment and Ecology Bureau ===
- Secretary for Environment and Ecology: Tse Chin-wan
- Under Secretary for the Environment: (vacant)
- Permanent Secretary for Environment and Ecology (Environment)/Director of Environmental Protection: Janice Tse
- Permanent Secretary for Environment and Ecology (Food): Vivian Lau
- Environmental Protection Department
- Hong Kong Observatory
- Agriculture, Fisheries and Conservation Department
- Food and Environmental Hygiene Department
- Government Laboratory

=== Health Bureau ===
- Secretary for Food and Health: Lo Chung-mau
- Under Secretary for Food and Health: (vacant)
- Permanent Secretary for Health: Thomas Chan
- Department of Health

=== Home and Youth Affairs Bureau ===
- Secretary for Home and Youth Affairs: Alice Mak
- Under Secretary for Home and Youth Affairs: (vacant)
- Permanent Secretary for Home and Youth Affairs: Shirley Lam
- Home Affairs Department
- Information Services Department

=== Labour and Welfare Bureau ===
- Secretary for Labour and Welfare: Chris Sun
- Under Secretary for Labour and Welfare: Ho Kai-ming
- Permanent Secretary for Labour and Welfare: Alice Lau
- Labour Department
- Social Welfare Department

=== Security Bureau ===
- Secretary for Security: Chris Tang
- Under Secretary for Security: (vacant)
- Permanent Secretary for Security: Patrick Li
- Auxiliary Medical Service
- Civil Aid Service
- Correctional Services Department
- Customs and Excise Department
- Fire Services Department
- Government Flying Service
- Hong Kong Police Force
- Immigration Department
- Hong Kong Auxiliary Police Force
- Narcotics Division
- Commissioner on Interception of Communications and Surveillance

=== Culture, Sports and Tourism Bureau ===
- Secretary for Culture, Sports and Tourism: Rosanna Law
- Under Secretary for Culture, Sports and Tourism: (vacant)
- Permanent Secretary for Culture, Sports and Tourism: Joe Wong Chi-cho
- Leisure and Cultural Services Department
- Tourism Commission
- Create Hong Kong

== Financial Secretary ==
(“Department of Finance” per Article 60 of the Basic Law)

- Financial Secretary: Paul Chan
- Deputy Financial Secretary: Michael Wong
- Office of the Government Economist
- Hong Kong Monetary Authority

=== Commerce and Economic Development Bureau ===
- Secretary for Commerce and Economic Development: Algernon Yau
- Under Secretary for Commerce and Economic Development: Bernard Chan Pak-li
- Permanent Secretary for Commerce and Economic Development: Eliza Lee Man-ching
- Intellectual Property Department
- Invest Hong Kong (InvestHK)
- Office of the Communications Authority (OFCA)
- Post Office
- Radio Television Hong Kong (RTHK)
- Trade and Industry Department
- Hong Kong Economic and Trade Offices (Overseas) (HKETOs)

=== Development Bureau ===
- Secretary for Development: Bernadette Linn
- Under Secretary for Development: (vacant)
- Permanent Secretary for Development (Works): Ricky Lau Chun-kit
- Permanent Secretary for Development (Planning and Lands): (vacant)
- Architectural Services Department
- Buildings Department
- Civil Engineering and Development Department
- Drainage Services Department
- Electrical and Mechanical Services Department
- Lands Department
  - Lands Administration Office
- Land Registry
- Planning Department
- Water Supplies Department
- Antiquities and Monuments Office

=== Financial Services and the Treasury Bureau ===
- Secretary for Financial Services and the Treasury: Christopher Hui
- Under Secretary for Financial Services and the Treasury: Joseph Chan Ho-lim
- Permanent Secretary for the Financial Services and the Treasury (Treasury): Cathy Chu
- Permanent Secretary for the Financial Services and the Treasury (Financial Services): Salina Yan
- Census and Statistics Department
- Company Registry
- Government Logistics Department
- Government Property Agency
- Inland Revenue Department
- Insurance Authority
- Official Receiver's Office
- Rating and Valuation Department
- The Treasury

=== Innovation, Technology and Industry Bureau ===
- Secretary for Innovation, Technology and Industry: Dong Sun
- Under Secretary for Innovation and Technology: Lillian Cheong
- Permanent Secretary for the Innovation and Technology: Annie Choi
- Innovation and Technology Commission
- Digital Policy Office
  - Office of the Government Chief Information Officer
  - Efficiency Office

=== Transport and Logistics Bureau ===
- Secretary for Transport and Logistics: Lam Sai-hung
- Under Secretary for Transport and Logistics: (vacant)
- Permanent Secretary for Transport and Logistics: Mable Chan
- Civil Aviation Department
- Highways Department
- Marine Department
- Transport Department

=== Housing Bureau ===
- Secretary for Housing: Winnie Ho
- Under Secretary for Housing: (vacant)
- Permanent Secretary for Housing/Director of Housing: Agnes Wong
- Housing Department

== Related bodies and organisations ==
- Airport Authority Hong Kong
- Chinese Medicine Council of Hong Kong
- Commission On Youth
- Committee on the Promotion of Civic Education
- Competition Policy Advisory Group
- Construction Industry Council
- Construction Industry Training Authority
- Consumer Council
- Council for the AIDS Trust Fund
- Education Commission
- Elderly Commission
- Electoral Affairs Commission
- Electronic Investor Resources Centre
- Employees Retraining Board
- Equal Opportunities Commission
- Estate Agents Authority
- Hong Kong Arts Centre
- Hong Kong Arts Development Council
- Hong Kong Council for Academic Accreditation
- Hong Kong Council on Smoking and Health
- Hong Kong Examinations and Assessment Authority
- Hong Kong Exchanges and Clearing Limited (HKEx)
- Hong Kong Export Credit Insurance Corporation
- Hong Kong Housing Society
- Hong Kong International Arbitration Centre
- Hong Kong Logistics Development Council
- Hong Kong Maritime and Port Board
- Hong Kong Mortgage Corporation Limited
- Hong Kong Productivity Council
- Hong Kong Science and Technology Parks Corporation
- Hong Kong Sports Institute Limited
- Hong Kong Tourism Board
- Hong Kong Trade Development Council
- Hospital Authority
- Independent Police Complaints Council
- Kowloon-Canton Railway Corporation
- Law Reform Commission of Hong Kong
- Legal Aid Services Council
- Mandatory Provident Fund Schemes Authority
- MTR Corporation Limited
- Occupational Safety and Health Council
- Office of the Communications Authority
- Office of the Privacy Commissioner for Personal Data, Hong Kong
- Official Solicitor's Office
- Provisional Construction Industry Co-ordination Board
- Quality Education Fund
- Public Works Department
- Review Body on Bid Challenges
- Secretariat, Commissioner on Interception of Communications and Surveillance
- Securities and Futures Appeals Tribunal
- Securities and Futures Commission
- Security and Guarding Services Industry Authority
- Standing Commission on Civil Service Salaries and Conditions of Service
- Standing Committee on Directorate Salaries and Conditions of Service
- Standing Committee on Disciplined Services Salaries and Conditions of Service
- Standing Committee on Judicial Salaries and Conditions of Service
- Tourism Commission
- Town Planning Appeal Board
- Town Planning Board
- Transport Complaints Unit
- Urban Renewal Authority
- Vocational Training Council
- Women's Commission

== See also ==
- 1823 Call Centre
- Hong Kong Civil Service
- Administrative Officer (Hong Kong)
