= MediSafe controversy =

2025 Hong Kong student AI controversy

Between June and September 2025, a public debate occurred in Hong Kong about the originality and data practices of MediSafe, a purportedly student-built artificial intelligence platform. The project was developed by Clarisse Poon, a Form Four student at the St. Paul's Co-educational College, and won several innovation awards in 2024 and 2025. Online discussion and media coverage later raised concerns about the project's authorship and use of patient data, prompting official investigations.

== MediSafe ==
MediSafe (Chinese: 藥倍安心) is a web-based app designed to flag potential prescription errors by cross-checking medications against patient details such as allergies, chronic conditions, and liver or kidney function. According to award materials, the system uses large language models, SQL, and vector databases.

The platform received the following awards (all of which were later surrendered according to the statement issued in the name of Poon's parents):

- Student Innovation Grand Award at the 2024 Hong Kong ICT Awards.
- Silver Medal at the 50th International Exhibition of Inventions Geneva in 2025, with support from the Education Bureau.
- Youth Tech Pioneer of the Year Award, recognising secondary school innovation.

== Allegations ==
=== Whistleblower concerns ===
On 13 June 2025, Hailey Cheng Hei-Lam, a student at the City University of Hong Kong, posted concerns on Threads. She questioned whether such a complex AI system could have been built solely by a secondary school student and cited earlier statements suggesting the use of data from over 100 patients.

Cheng later said she received anonymous threats after making the post. Her comments triggered a wider discussion online about originality in student research, the role of external help, and how sensitive data is handled in youth-led tech projects.

=== AI Health Studio link ===
Some users pointed out that the MediSafe website previously redirected to AI Health Studio, a U.S.-based software company. Archived content from early 2025 described a prescription-checking system reportedly built for a Hong Kong clinic. Reports identified the clinic as one linked to Poon's father, Dr Poon Tung Ping (also known as Ronnie Poon).

The company's wording was later changed—what was originally described as "developed" became "optimised" and "commercialised". South China Morning Post noted that the earlier site version appeared to describe software similar to MediSafe and dated back to 2022.

=== Questions over data use ===
Several news outlets reported public concerns about whether real patient data had been used in the project. According to statements quoted by the Ming Pao and HK01, the organisers and Poon's family said only simulated data and publicly available drug databases were used.

A privacy-focused publication, Meta Connects, discussed the situation in light of Hong Kong's data privacy laws, raising issues around patient consent, potential cross-border data transfer, and whether external service providers were involved.

== Responses and investigations ==
=== Reactions from those involved ===
Poon later stated she was working with competition organisers to clarify the situation and found some of the online attention discouraging. Dr. Poon told the press that only simulated data had been used and that the award process had followed proper verification. St. Paul's Co-educational College confirmed it was reviewing the matter internally.

On 5 August 2025, Ahmed Jemaa, co-founder of AI Health Studio, issued an official statement on LinkedIn addressing the MediSafe controversy. The statement clarified that the company had not been informed the application they developed would be submitted to academic competitions, maintaining this gave unfair advantage to other student participants. Jemaa emphasised that while the client provided the initial concept, AI Health Studio developed the minimum viable product (MVP) entirely independently, stating explicitly that "no code, no UX, and no technical architecture were shared with them before starting the work on the project." The statement further accused Dr. Roberta Pang Wen Chi, Clarisse Poon's mother (Ronnie Poon's current wife), of attempting to control public perception following June's controversy surrounding the project's true authorship. Regarding institutional response, Jemaa expressed concerns about the Hong Kong Academy for Gifted Education's investigation, noting they had "closed the case without correcting the record" just weeks after commencing the probe, and that subsequent requests for clarification from AI Health Studio received no response.

On 22 August, the parents of Poon announced that they will voluntarily return all the awards MediSafe won, citing concerns to the mental and physical well-being of their daughter. In a public statement, Dr. Pang admitted that she had independently approached AI Health Studio to develop a MVP, although she insisted the concept of MediSafe was independently conceived by her daughter.

On 27 August, St. Paul's Co-educational College issued a public statement, stating that the school had no prior knowledge of AI Health Studio's involvement of the project, and only learnt it through public media.

=== Official and institutional responses ===
The Digital Policy Office said it had requested a full investigation by Hong Kong Education City and the Hong Kong ICT Awards’ Quality Assurance Panel. On 20 June, the Hong Kong Academy for Gifted Education and the Hong Kong New Generation Cultural Association issued a joint statement saying that the student had complied with competition rules. They also said no real patient data had been used and that company involvement came only after the competitions ended. The Office of the Privacy Commissioner for Personal Data confirmed it had received a complaint and was reviewing the matter.

== Media coverage and public response ==
The controversy was widely covered in both English- and Chinese-language media. The SCMP explored the timeline of MediSafe's development and highlighted discrepancies between its public narrative and archived versions of related websites. The Standard reported on government involvement and noted public doubts about the project's origin. Other local outlets, including the Ming Pao, HK01, and the Oriental Daily News, examined possible issues of academic outsourcing and privacy violations. On 24 June, HK01 reported that the jury of the International Exhibition of Inventions Geneva reviewed the case and decided to keep the award, stating the submission met its criteria.

== Timeline ==
- April 2024 – MediSafe wins the Student Innovation Grand Award at the Hong Kong ICT Awards.
- April 2025 – Project receives a Silver Medal at the International Exhibition of Inventions Geneva.
- 13 June 2025 – Hailey Cheng Hei-Lam raises concerns publicly on Threads.
- Mid‑June 2025 – Investigations launched by the Digital Policy Office and the Office of the Privacy Commissioner for Personal Data.
- 20 June 2025 – The Hong Kong Academy for Gifted Education and the Hong Kong New Generation Cultural Association confirm no rules were broken.
- 24 June 2025 – The jury of the International Exhibition of Inventions Geneva announces that the Silver Medal will not be revoked.
- 28 June 2025 – The Hong Kong Innovation Foundation has removed the relevant exhibited works.
- 22 August 2025 – The parents of Poon announced that they will voluntarily return all the awards MediSafe won.
- 27 August 2025 – St. Paul's Co-educational College issued a monolingual statement in Chinese disclaiming knowledge of AI Health Studio's involvement.
- 5 February 2026 - Hailey Cheng Hei-Lam was arrested for alleged "doxxing"-related offenses under Hong Kong's Personal Data (Privacy) Ordinance. She has been released on bail.

== See also ==
- Academic integrity
- Artificial intelligence in healthcare
- Data privacy
- Leakage (machine learning)
