= Government Records Service =

Department of the Hong Kong government

Coordinates: 22.31259°N 114.229517°E

- 政府檔案處
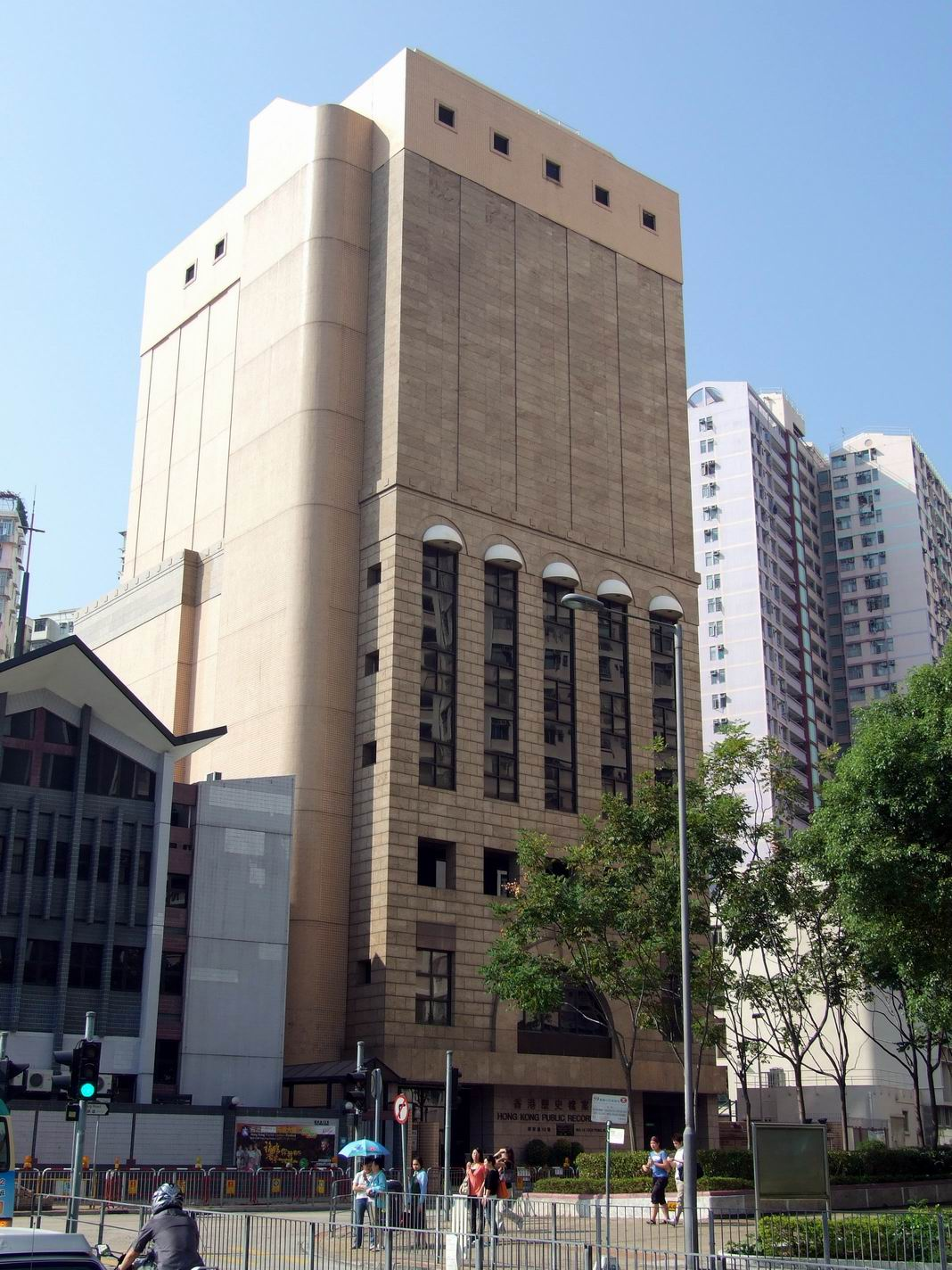
- The Hong Kong Public Records Building, at No 13 Tsui Ping Road, Kwun Tong

Department overview
- Formed: 1 September 1989; 37 years ago
- Jurisdiction: Hong Kong
- Headquarters: 3/F, Hong Kong Public Records Building, 13 Tsui Ping Road, Kwun Tong, Kowloon
- Minister responsible: Joseph Siu, Director
- Parent department: Administration Wing, Chief Secretary for Administration's Office
- Website: Official website

Government Records Service
- Traditional Chinese: 政府檔案處
- Simplified Chinese: 政府档案处
Transcriptions
Standard Mandarin
- Hanyu Pinyin: Zhèngfǔ Dàng'àn Chù
Yue: Cantonese
- Yale Romanization: Jing fú dóng on chyú
- Jyutping: Zing^{3} fu^{2} dong^{2} on^{3} cyu^{2}

Government Records Service (GRS) is the central records management service agency of the Hong Kong Government. It aims to be the most insightful, resourceful and leading public archives in Hong Kong. The department is subordinate to the Administration Wing of the Office of the Chief Secretary for Administration.

The agency incorporates the Public Records Office (PRO, 歷史檔案館), which is the designated archives to preserve and make accessible the archival records of the HKSAR Government. As of 2022, the office is the custodian of over 1.7 million archival holdings in various media and formats.

== History ==
The Public Records Office, Hong Kong was established on 24 July 1972 under the Home Affairs and Information Branch of the Colonial Secretariat, following discussions within the government on devising a system to preserve and dispose of government records. Its principal responsibility at that time was to conserve all government records of permanent value for official reference and private research. The major areas of work were to help government agencies maintain the standards of records management, to provide facilities for the custody and maintenance of records for permanent preservation, and to make records available for both official reference and private research.

Ian Diamond, an Australian archivist who was previously involved in setting up the National Archives of Fiji, was appointed as the Government Archivist and was tasked with the herculean task of setting up the office from scratch, in a city where archives were hitherto non-existent.

The PRO was initially housed in a two-storey hut at 1A Garden Road, where Three Garden Road, Central now stands. The building was converted from the galley of the Murray Barracks, and had a storage capacity of around 1,500 linear metres. In September 1974, the PRO was relocated to the ground floor and mezzanine of Murray Road Multi-storey Car Park Building, where the PRO would call home for the next 20 years. The PRO was slated to be relocated again into the planned Murray Building II where 25,000 square feet of space will be allotted to the archives, but the plan never materialised as the building plan was scrapped.

In order to free up space at the Murray Road Car Park to house the expanding offices of the ICAC, the government proposed in 1993 to relocate the PRO to Tuen Mun Government Storage Centre (Sun Yick Industrial Building). The permanent relocation of the archives from the city centre to an industrial building in the New Territories sparked outrage among users, history scholars and legislators, who believed that the new location was too remote and were worried that records might be damaged by air pollution in Tuen Mun. The Legislative Council's information policy panel voted overwhelmingly against the move in 1993, but the relocation nevertheless proceeded on 20 July 1995. The authorities relented in October 1994 and announced to the legislators that a site in Kwun Tong has been identified for the construction of a purpose-built public records building. The building was to take a fan-shaped design with 41,340 square foot of floor space, costing $45 million. The original design was later replaced by a 71,000 square foot rectangular building, with the cost rising to $85.6 million and completion date pushed back early 1997 to November 1997. Work commenced on the building in January 1996 and was completed by June 1997; the Hong Kong Public Records Building was officially opened by Chief Secretary Anson Chan on 19 June 1997.

== Structure ==
As a government agency, the Government Records Service Division was established on 1 September 1989 following a review on government records management by the former Constitutional Affairs Branch. The Public Records Office was placed under the division together with the Government Records Co-ordination Unit (GRCU), which was formed under the Office of the Deputy Chief Secretary to implement records management regimes in the government. Upon the restructuring of the division on 20 October 2003, the word "Division" was dropped from its name.

Today, the GRS comprises five departments: The Public Records Office, which performs the functions of archival appraisal, accessioning and description, public programme; and reference services; the Preservation Service Office, which take charges of the preservation and conservation of GRS holdings; the Record Systems Development Office, which oversees the government-wide implementation of electronic records management (ERM) and electronic record keeping systems; the Records Management and Administration Office, which provides training, advisory, review and records centre services to government agencies on effective records management; and the Legislation and Planning Office, which is tasked with the study of archive law issues and the strategic planning of the GRS.

== Collections ==
As of 2022, the Public Records Office is home to 1,707,700 archival holdings, adding up to about 23,026 linear metres. The bulk of the holdings at the PRO were acquired from government agencies and belong to the Hong Kong Record Series (HKRS). The remaining holdings are donated by private sources like public organisations, private institutions and individuals associated with the history and development of Hong Kong, and are classified as Hong Kong Manuscript Series (HKMS).

The PRO also purchases reproduction copy of records relating to Hong Kong from other archival institutions like The National Archives (United Kingdom) and the George W. Bush Presidential Center, and these copies are also classified into HKMS.

A Central Preservation Library for Government Publications is operated by the PRO to preserve publications and printed materials issued by the government. Government bureaux and departments are asked to forward one copy of their new publication/printed material to the Library for selection. As at the end of December 2017, it preserved around 43,400 publications.

The PRO also houses the Carl Smith Collection (施其樂牧師資料集), a series of 139,922 double-sided index cards with information on individuals, organisations, buildings, roads, land matters and important events relating to Hong Kong, Macau and China's coastal cities since the mid 19th century. These index cards were compiled by the Reverend Carl Thurman Smith (1918–2008) throughout his 25 years of intensive research into PRO holdings, newspapers and publications. As of 2008, the Carl Smith Collection was the most frequently used part of the PRO's holdings.

=== Public access ===
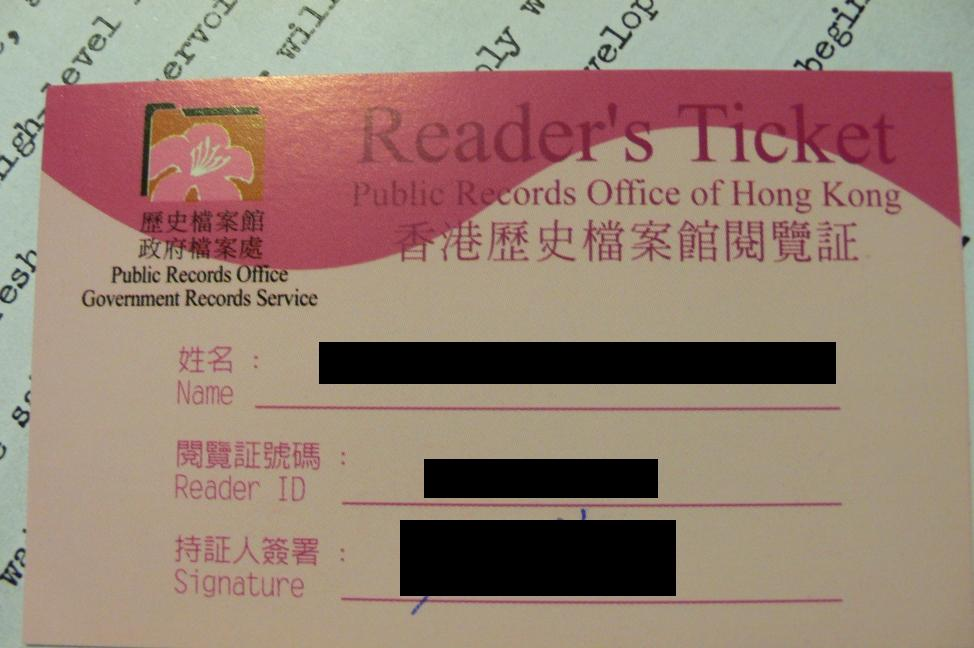
Prior to the commissioning of the “@PRO” system, a reader's ticket was required to access PRO holdings

Members of the public may inspect the holdings of the PRO by paying a visit to the Search Room in the Hong Kong Public Records Building. They may register for a free reader's account and order records on “@PRO”, the online catalogue of the GRS. Prior to the COVID-19 pandemic in Hong Kong, both walk-ins and reservations for inspecting records were accepted, but the PRO now requires readers to make a reservation in advance.

Public access to archival records held by the PRO is governed by the Public Records (Access) Rules 1996, which establishes that the public are able to gain access to most records that have been closed for over 30 years. Apart from records that have not reach the 30-year limit, records containing personal data and classified records that are awaiting transferring agencies' confirmation of their access status might also be counted as exceptions from the limit and continue to be closed thereafter. Nevertheless, members of the public may apply to view closed records, in which case the PRO would consult the transferring agency to ascertain if the request should be granted.

A small part of the PRO's collections is also digitised and placed on the GRS website.

== Facilities ==
Home to the Government Records Service, the Hong Kong Public Records Building is located in Kwun Tong, Kowloon, Hong Kong. It was opened in 1997. The building is accessible within walking distance from Kwun Tong station of MTR.

It was the first purpose-built archival facility in Hong Kong. It has public areas including a large working reference room, an exhibition hall and a search room equipped with computers for access to the extensive archival collection.

Apart from the main facility in Kwun Tong, the Government Records Service also operates two record centres, namely Tuen Mun Records Centre and YKK Records Centre, in Tuen Mun. The remote facilities are where inactive records are stored on behalf of government bureaux and departments.
