= Administration Wing =

- 行政署

Agency overview
- Jurisdiction: Government of Hong Kong
- Headquarters: 25/F & 26/F, Central Government Offices, 2 Tim Mei Avenue, Tamar, Hong Kong
- Annual budget: $12,649.7 m HKD (2022–2023)
- Agency executives: Brian Lo, Director of Administration; Bobby Cheng, Deputy Director of Administration (1); Eva Yam, Deputy Director of Administration (2)
- Parent department: Office of the Chief Secretary for Administration
- Website: https://www.admwing.gov.hk/

Administration Wing (Chinese: 行政署) of the Office of the Chief Secretary for Administration is an executive agency in the Government of Hong Kong, reporting directly to the Chief Secretary and Financial Secretary. It is mainly responsible to oversee the effective functioning of the Government Secretariat machinery and managing the relations between the government and the Legislative Council, Judiciary, independent statutory agencies, consular missions.

== Child agencies ==
- Protocol Division
- Government Records Service
- Office of Former Chief Executives
- Legal Aid Department

== Directors ==
- Sir Donald Tsang Yam-kuen (1989–1991)
- Nicholas Ng Wing-fui (1991–1994)
- Richard John Freer Hoare (1994–1997)
- Carrie Yau Tsang Kar-lai (1997–2000)
- Andrew Wong Ho-yuen (2000–2004)
- Chang King-yiu (2004–2006)
- Elizabeth Tse Man-yee (2006–2007)
- Jennifer Mak Yee-ming (2007–2012)
- Kitty Choi Kit-yu (2012–2019)
- Esther Leung Yuet-yin (2019–2020)
- Daniel Cheng Chung-wai (2020–2022)
- Brian Lo Sai-hung (2022–)

== Controversies ==
=== Avoiding the use of politically-incorrect terms, e.g. "China-Hong Kong Relations' ===
On 17 February 2015, the Administration Wing has issued an internal guidance about the usage of politically correct terminologies. They have told other governmental departments to standardise the use of language in correspondence involving the city's sovereignty and external relations, for instance addressing issues relating to China-Hong Kong Relations as 'Mainland-Hong Kong Relations' instead, or quoting related terms such as 'One Country Two Systems' or 'Hong Kong people ruling Hong Kong'.

The spokesperson of the agency claimed that the guidance imposed were to allow the wordings to be in align with the provisions stipulated in the Basic Law.

However, the Civic Party lawmaker Claudia Mo then have criticised the act, which would effectively introduce Mainland Chinese terms into official documents.

== See also ==
- Chief Secretary for Administration
