= McKinsey Report =

1972 report on the structure of the Hong Kong government

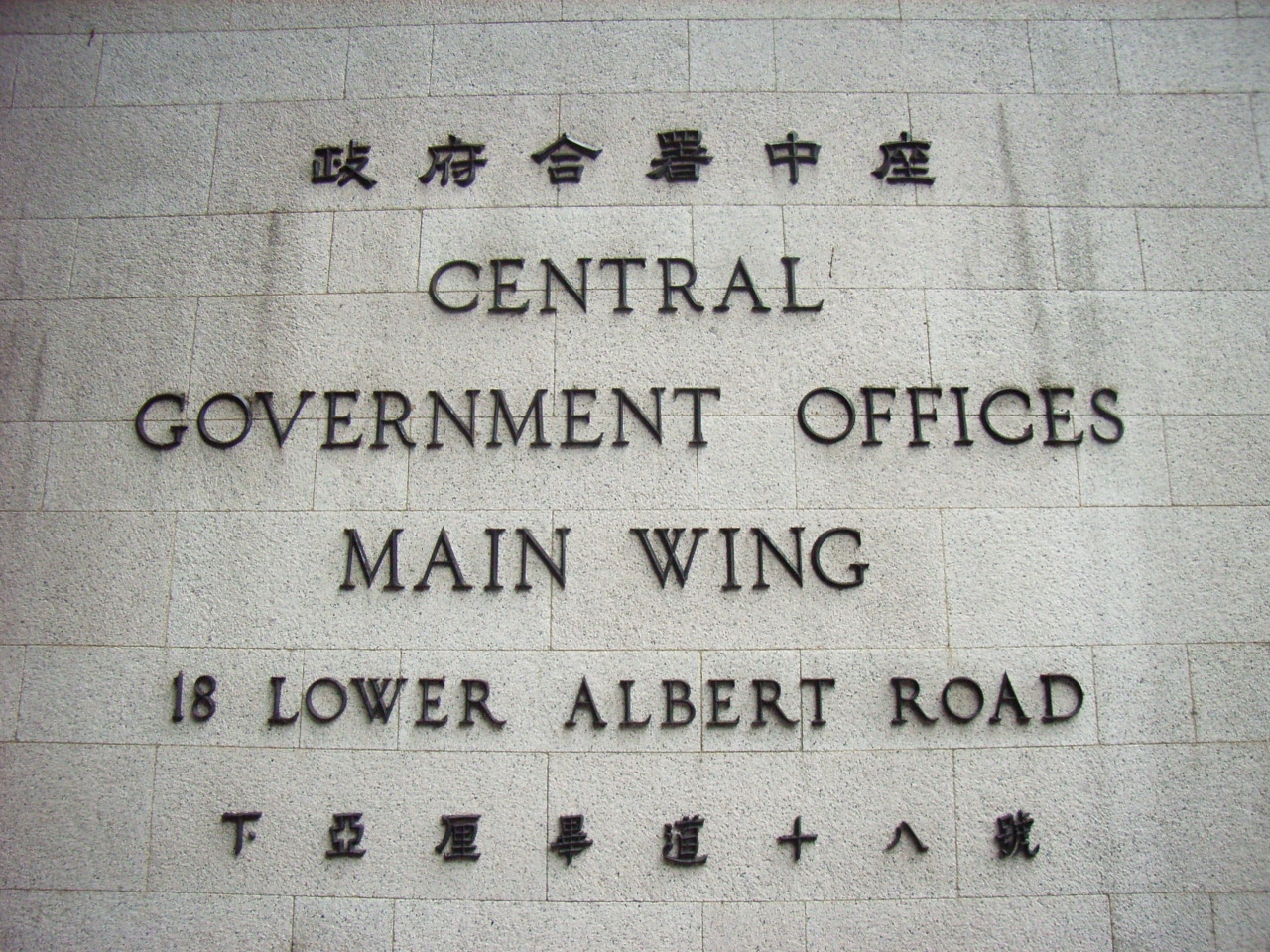
The Main Wing of the Central Government Offices, where the Colonial Secretariat was located

The McKinsey Report (Chinese: 麥健時報告書), officially titled "Strengthening the Machinery of Government", was a proposal created by McKinsey & Company for improving and reorganising the executive branch of the Hong Kong government. Commissioned by Governor Murray MacLehose and published in two parts in November 1972 and May 1973, most of its recommendations were swiftly implemented by the British Hong Kong government.

== Background ==
In the late 1960s and 1970s, Hong Kong had one of the world's fastest-growing economies, with a population that had doubled from 2 million to four million between 1950 and 1970, leading to increasing pressure on public services. Governor MacLehose, who took office in 1971, had plans to reform Hong Kong's social policy and greatly expand the welfare system, which would place even greater pressure on the government. MacLehose, a former diplomat, bore a mistrust of the colonial government and found its bureaucratic machinery an obstacle to his proposed reforms. He subsequently commissioned McKinsey & Company in 1972 to produce a report on how the bureaucracy could be improved, without touching the colony's basic constitutional arrangements. The choice of engaging a "modern" firm of management consultants was a novel one; the usual practice would have been to appoint a high-level commission of senior or recently retired civil servants and distinguished citizens in Hong Kong, or to request the appointment of a royal commission by the British government in London.

== Recommendations and implementation ==
In its first report in November 1972, McKinsey suggested that the biggest problem facing the government was its "fundamental difficulty of trying to expand services in the face of a continuing decline in numbers of skilled and experienced staff, and the resulting dilution of their efforts." The report's recommendations were focused on two dimensions: improving the existing machinery of government, and reorganising the top echelons of the administration.

=== Reorganisation of the Colonial Secretariat ===
==== The old system ====
At the time of the report's publication, power in the government was heavily concentrated at the top, which had worked well and efficiently when the government was much smaller. In the past, even the most senior officials would be able to keep track of both important policy issues and minor administrative matters, allowing them to act quickly and decisively. However, as a consequence of the government's massive post-war expansion, the system had come under great strain, with top officials struggling to keep up with the proliferation of departments and their exponentially expanding responsibilities. Disagreements between the relatively junior principal assistant colonial secretaries in the Colonial Secretariat, who were in charge of coordinating policy and administrative matters, and the relatively senior heads of departments, would be escalated to the Colonial Secretary or the Financial Secretary, overloading them with relatively trivial matters. By the early 1970s, the colony's top administrators could only direct their attention to immediate issues, leaving them without time to think strategically about important policy issues or make long-term plans for the future.

==== The re-organised structure ====
The revised structure added a new layer of six policy branches and two resource branches between the three top officials and the various government departments. The new branches would coordinate and supervise departments without overloading the officials at the top, with each branch headed by a secretary of equivalent rank to a head of a major department, taking over from the relatively junior Principal Assistant Colonial Secretaries in the previous structure. McKinsey conceived that the policy branches would delegate much of their day-to-day administrative responsibilities to the departments, with the branches taking on the job of policy formulation.

==== Implementation ====
The six new policy branches created in 1973 were Economic Services, Environment, Home Affairs, Housing, Security, and Social Services, with the two new resource branches being the Finance Branch and the Establishment Branch.

In 1974, the New Territories Administration was upgraded to become a branch, with the District Commissioner for the New Territories retitled as the Secretary for the New Territories Administration. The Colonial Secretary was retitled the Chief Secretary in 1976, with the Colonial Secretariat accordingly renamed to the Government Secretariat. In 1980, the Education Branch was created with the Secretary for Education as its head, with the Education Department coming under its purview.

== Public response ==
The government's re-organised structure was often described at the time as being a miniature cabinet. Some observers noted that the new structure resembled that of a corporation, ostensibly bringing with it the efficiency of a business; the governor was compared to a CEO, with the Chief Secretary, Financial Secretary and Attorney General as his deputies, to whom the secretaries of the new branches were responsible, with the Executive and Legislative Councils playing the role of the shareholders. However, some within the government were critical of the way the reforms were carried out, with some senior civil servants feeling some unease at the break in tradition and the sense that they had been sidestepped. The reforms also shifted policymaking power from the Executive and Legislative Councils to the civil service, with civil servants having to adapt from their previous role of only having to carry out policy.
