= Digital Policy Office =

Department of the Hong Kong government

- 數字政策辦公室
- Emblem of Hong Kong

Department overview
- Formed: 2024
- Preceding agencies: Office of the Government Chief Information Officer; Efficiency Office
- Jurisdiction: Government of Hong Kong
- Headquarters: (Hong Kong) 10-14/F, Treasury Building, 3 Tonkin Street West, Cheung Sha Wan, Kowloon
- Minister responsible: Tony Wong Chi-kwong, Commissioner ^{CDP}
- Deputy Ministers responsible: Patricia SO Pui-sai, Deputy Commissioner ^{DG}; Donald MAK Chi-kui, Deputy Commissioner ^{DA}; Daniel CHEUNG Yee-wai, Deputy Commissioner ^{DI}
- Parent department: Digital Economy Development Committee
- Parent Department: Innovation, Technology and Industry Bureau
- Website: digitalpolicy.gov.hk

Footnotes
- CDP: Government Chief Information Officer, directorate grade 6; DG: Administrative Officer Staff Grade B1, directorate grade 4; DA: Deputy Head, Efficiency Unit, directorate grade 3; DI: Deputy Director of Information Technology Service, directorate grade 3

The Digital Policy Office (DPO, Chinese: 數字政策辦公室) is an agency of the Hong Kong government established in 2024, in charge of policy and regulation of information technology, information security, telecommunications and strengthening digitalization in Hong Kong. The Digital Policy Office is established by merging the Office of the Government Chief Information Officer (OGCIO) and the Efficiency Office (EffO), both under the Innovation, Technology and Industry Bureau. The DPO is led by the Commissioner for Digital Policy ranked at Government Chief Information Officer (directorate grade 6).

== Background ==
Following the Chief Executive’s 2023 Policy Address, John Lee Ka-chiu’s government planned to develop Hong Kong into an international innovation and technology Centre including advance development of digital government. Lee suggested to set up the Digital Policy Office responsible for driving development with data and policies.

== Organization ==
Digital Policy Office
Commissioner for Digital Policy
Deputy Commissioner	Deputy Commissioner	Deputy Commissioner
Digital Government	Data Governance	Digital Infrastructure
Digitalisation and Business Facilitation	Data Applications	Common Services and Sourcing
Digital Efficiency and Resources	Data Platforms	Project Governance and Security
Digital Inclusion and Research	Contact Centre and Change Management	Mainland and Industry Collaboration
Government Service Enhancement	Data Application Consultancy	Finance
Administration

== Commissioner ==
The DPO is headed by the Commissioner for Digital Policy (titled Government Chief Information Officer before 2024).

=== List of commissioners ===
- Tony Wong Chi-kwong, Chinese: 黃志光 (2024 - incumbent)

== See also ==
- Information technology management
- Internet censorship in Hong Kong
- Hong Kong ICT Awards
