= Office of the Privacy Commissioner =

Office of the Privacy Commissioner may refer to:

- Office of the Australian Information Commissioner
- Office of the Privacy Commissioner for Personal Data (Hong Kong)
- Privacy Commissioner of Canada
  - Information and Privacy Commissioner of Ontario
- Privacy Commissioner (New Zealand)
