= Ministry of Efficiency =

Ministry of Efficiency or Department of Efficiency may refer to:

- Department of Government Efficiency, an initiative of the United States federal government
- Efficiency Office, a government department in the Hong Kong government
- Minister of State for Brexit Opportunities and Government Efficiency, a ministerial office in the British government
- United States Bureau of Efficiency, a bureau from 1916 to 1933 in the United States federal government
