= 1823 Call Centre =

Governmental hotline in Hong Kong

1823
Agency overview
- Formed: July 2001
- Type: Hotline/call centre
- Status: Active
- Parent department: Efficiency Unit
- Website: 1823.gov.hk

1823 is a 24x7 one-stop hotline services operated by the Government of Hong Kong.

== History ==
1823 was launched by the Efficiency Unit of the Government Secretariat in July 2001 and became fully operational in October 2002.

1823 aims as a replacement of telephone hotlines, fax numbers, email and other addresses operated by various government departments.

In 2009, the Centre answered over 2.4 million calls. Over 16.5 million calls have been answered in ten years' time.

== Function ==
It answers public enquiries on behalf of more than 20 participating departments and receives public complaints against the Government. It also act as a platform for resolving cross-departmental complaints.

For enquiries regarding Departments not covered by 1823, the Call Centre can provide relevant contact information. Public enquiries or complaints can be made by phone, fax, SMS, email, online, or post.

== See also ==
- HKChat
