= Office of the Government Economist =

Office of the chief economic adviser to the Hong Kong government

- 政府經濟顧問辦公室

Agency overview
- Formed: 2004
- Jurisdiction: Government of Hong Kong
- Headquarters: 25/F & 26/F, Central Government Offices, 2 Tim Mei Avenue, Tamar, Hong Kong
- Agency executives: Adolph Leung, Government Economist; Cecilia Lam, Deputy Government Economist
- Parent department: Financial Secretary's Office
- Website: Official Website

The Office of the Government Economist (OGE) is a government agency in Hong Kong that provides information and analysis on the Hong Kong economy to the public. It is part of the Financial Secretary's Office.

== History ==
Until 1 April 2018, the office was known as the Economic Analysis and Business Facilitation Unit. The office was formed under the Financial Secretary's Office on 1 June 2004, when the government merged the Economic Analysis Division (under the Financial Services Branch of the Financial Services and the Treasury Bureau) and the Business Facilitation Division (previously under the Commerce and Industry Branch of the Commerce, Industry and Technology Bureau).

== Structure ==
The office is led by the Government Economist, who is deputised by the Deputy Government Economist. The office consists of 6 sections, each of which is in charge of a specific area of economic analysis. Each section is led by a Principal Economist.

Section	Portfolio
I	Global, Asian, and Hong Kong economy; Fiscal and tax policy
II	Property market; Housing and land; Transport; Major infrastructure projects
III	Mainland economy; Regional and international trade and economic relations
IV	Labour; Education; Manpower; Labour legislation
V	Population; Poverty and welfare
VI	Local and international competitiveness; New economic growth drivers

== Government Economist ==
The Government Economist is the head of the agency. Before the merger in 2004, the Government Economist was head of the Economic Analysis Division of the Financial Services and the Treasury Bureau..

The position is graded at D5 on the Directorate Pay Scale, equivalent to a head of a subordinate department. Until 2016, it was graded at D4, equivalent to a deputy secretary of a policy bureau.

The Government Economist is assisted by a Deputy Government Economist, who is graded at D3. The deputy position was created in 2016.

=== List of Government Economists ===
No.	Name	Chinese name	Tenure start	Tenure end	Tenure length
1	Alan McLean	馬敬廉	26 September 1984	4 October 1989	
2	Tang Kwong-yiu JP	鄧廣堯	November 1989	7 May 2004	
3	Kwok Kwok-chuen BBS JP	郭國全	11 October 2004	31 October 2008	
4	Helen Chan JP	陳李藹倫	1 November 2008	16 April 2018	
5	Andrew Au Sik-hung JP	歐錫熊	17 April 2018	18 April 2022	
6	Adolph Leung Wing-sing JP	梁永勝	19 April 2022	Incumbent (on pre-retirement leave since 8 April 2025)	
