= Registration and Electoral Office =

Department of the Hong Kong Government

- 選舉事務處
- Emblem of Hong Kong

Department overview
- Formed: 1 April 1994
- Jurisdiction: Government of Hong Kong
- Headquarters: (Hong Kong) 8/F, Treasury Building, 3 Tonkin Street West, Cheung Sha Wan, Kowloon
- Motto: Open, Honest, Fair
- Minister responsible: Raymond WANG Man-chiu, Chief Electoral Officer (Note: Senior Principal Executive Officer, Directorate grade 2)
- Deputy Ministers responsible: Natalie CHAN Shuk-wa, Principal Electoral Officer^{E} (Note: Principal Executive Officer, Directorate grade 1); LAM Fai, Principal Electoral Officer^{PR} (Note: Principal Executive Officer, Directorate grade 1)
- Department executive: Terry LEW Shing-fong, Chief Systems Manager (Note: Analyst/Programmer Grade, Directorate grade 1)
- Parent department: Electoral Affairs Commission
- Parent Department: Constitutional and Mainland Affairs Bureau
- Child agencies: Committee and Research Division; Voter Registration Division; Administration Division; Information Technology Management Division; Elections Divisions; Media Relations Unit
- Key document: Electoral Affairs Commission Ordinance
- Website: www.reo.gov.hk

Map
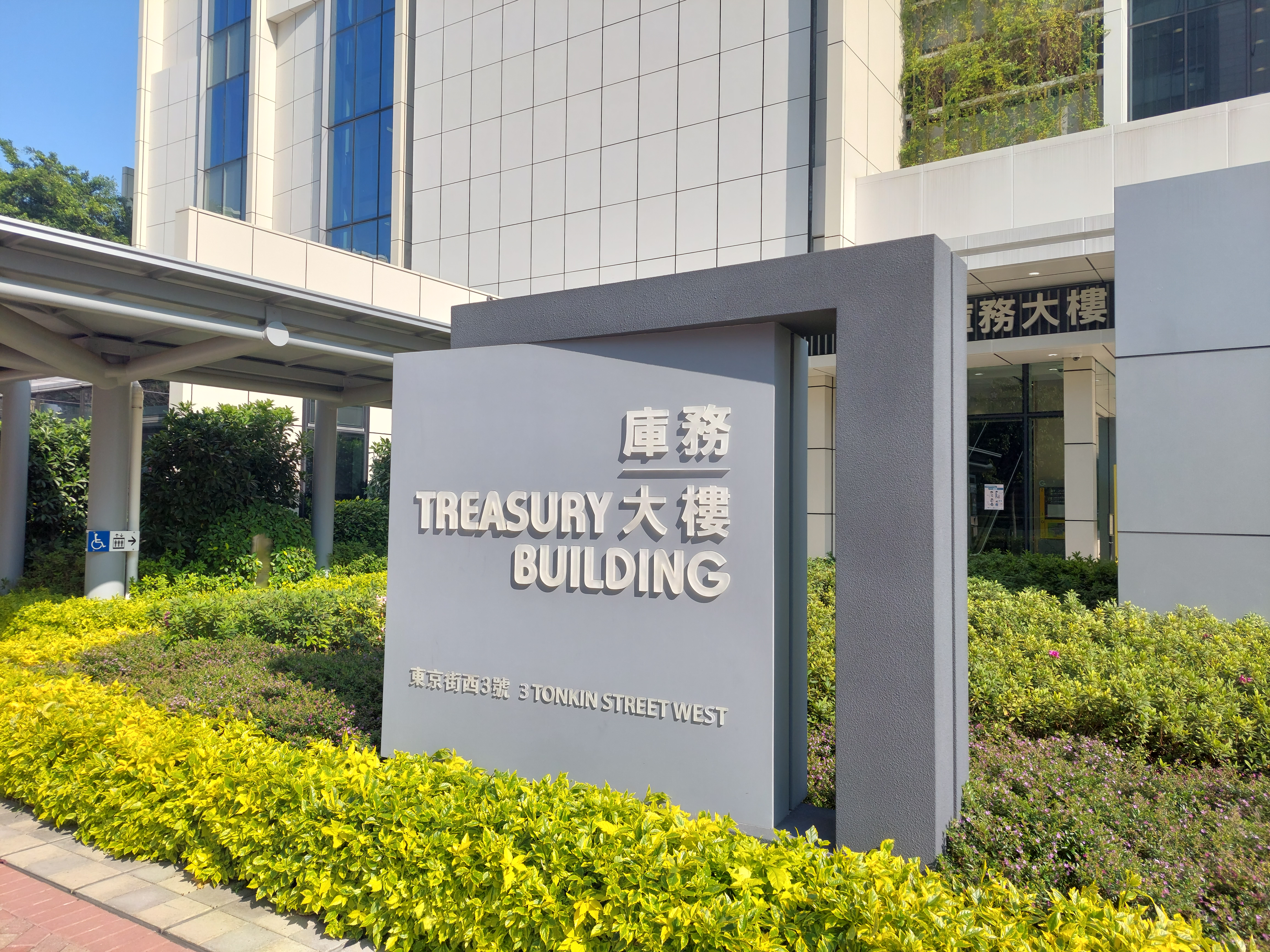
- Headquarters location of the REO

Footnotes
- E: Elections; PR: Planning and Research; Tel. no.: +852 2891 1001; Email: reoenqreo.gov.hk
Registration and Electoral Office
- Traditional Chinese: 選舉事務處
- Simplified Chinese: 选举事务处
Transcriptions
Standard Mandarin
- Hanyu Pinyin: Xuǎnjǔ Shìwù Chù
Yue: Cantonese
- Yale Romanization: Syún géui sih mouh chyú
- Jyutping: Syun^{2} geoi^{2} si^{6} mou^{6} cyu^{3}

The Registration and Electoral Office (REO) (Chinese: 選舉事務處) is a department under the jurisdiction of the Constitutional and Mainland Affairs Bureau (CMAB) of the Hong Kong Government. It is also an administrative support organisation of the Electoral Affairs Commission (EAC), which assists the implementation of the statutory rights under the Electoral Affairs Commission Ordinance.

The REO assists members of the public to register as electors, dividing constituencies, and formulating electoral regulations and guidelines for election activities. The elections of Chief Executive, Election Committee, Legislative Council and District Council are all managed by the office. However, the REO is a logistics department and has no decision-making power on the electoral policy as the decision-making power is vested in the EAC.

The REO is headed by the Chief Electoral Officer (CEO), who is assisted by the Principal Electoral Officers (PEO) and the Chief Systems Manager (CSM). The head office is at the Treasury Building in Cheung Sha Wan, with several other divisions at the Millennium City in Kwun Tong and Kowloonbay International Trade & Exhibition Centre in Kowloon Bay.

== List of CEOs ==
- Chief Electoral Officer (Senior Principal Executive Officer, Directorate grade 2)
1. Dr. Yau Sheung-mui, Chinese: 邱霜梅 (July 1993 – June 1996)
2. Ms. Cheung Ying-choi, Chinese: 張英才 (June 1996 - August 1997)
3. Mr. Li Wing, Chinese: 李榮 (August 1997 – 30 December 2004)
4. Mr. Lam Man-ho, Chinese: 林文浩 (30 December 2004 – 11 October 2007)
5. Mrs. Ting Tsui Wai-ming, Chinese: 丁徐慧明 (11 October 2007 – 17 May 2011)
6. Mr. Li Pak-hong, Chinese: 李柏康 (17 May 2011 – 26 September 2016)
7. Mr. Wong See-man, Chinese: 黃思文 (26 September 2016 – 24 July 2019)
  - Mr. Wang Man-chiu, Chinese: 黃文超 (acting, 24 July 2019 – 2 October 2019)
8. Mr. Wang Man-chiu, Chinese: 黃文超 (2 October 2019 – 14 January 2020)
9. Mr. Yung Ying-fai, Chinese: 翁應輝 (14 January 2020 – 12 January 2022)
10. Mr. Wang Man-chiu, Chinese: 黃文超 (12 January 2022 – )

== List of PEOs ==
- Principal Electoral Officer (Principal Executive Officer, Directorate grade 1)
1. Mrs. Chan Chan Shui-ye, Chinese: 陳陳瑞儀 (temporary, April 2008 – October 2008)
2. Mr. Chan Shiu-lun, Chinese: 陳紹麟 (January 2011 – April 2013)
3. Ms. Ma Siu-hung, Chinese: 馬笑虹 (July 2014 – March 2018)
4. Mr. Wang Man-chiu, Chinese: 黃文超 (March 2018 – September 2019)
5. Ms. Lee Fuk-moon, Chinese: 李復滿 (September 2019 – January 2020)
6. Mr. Wang Man-chiu, Chinese: 黃文超 (January 2020 – January 2021)
7. Ms. Ho Koon-ling, Chinese: 何觀玲 (January 2021 – November 2021)
8. Ms. Chan Cheuk-yin, Chinese: 陳竹燕 (November 2021 – January 2022)
9. Ms. Chan Shuk-wa, Chinese: 陳淑華 (January 2022 – )
10. Mrs. Chan Wong Kit-ming, Chinese: 陳黃潔明 (August 2023 – February 2024)
11. Mr. Lam Fai, Chinese: 林暉 (March 2024 – )

== List of CSMs ==
- Head of Information Technology Management (Chief Systems Manager, Directorate grade 1)
  1. Ms. Yung Wai-hing, Chinese: 翁慧卿 (temporary, January 2023 – August 2023)
1. Ms. Yung Wai-hing, Chinese: 翁慧卿 (August 2023 – March 2024)
2. Dr. Lew Shing-fong, Chinese: 劉成方 (April 2024 – )

== Organization ==
Registration and Electoral Office
Chief Electoral Officer
Senior Principal Executive Officer
Principal Electoral Officer (Planning and Research)	Head (Information Technology Management)	Principal Electoral Officer (Elections)
Principal Executive Officer	Chief Systems Manager	Principal Executive Officer
Committee and Research Division	Voter Registration Division	Administration Division	Information Technology Management Division	Elections Divisions	Media Relations Unit
Deputy Chief Electoral Officer	Deputy Chief Electoral Officers	Deputy Chief Electoral Officer	Senior Systems Managers	Deputy Chief Electoral Officers	Chief Information Officer
Secretariat of the EAC, Committee and Research Section	Voter Registration, Enhanced Checking	Administration Section, Supplies Section	Information Technology, New Electoral and Registration System	Elections Division 1-5	Media liaison, news and publicity

== See also ==
- Elections in Hong Kong
- Hong Kong Civil Service
