= Audit Commission (Hong Kong) =

- 審計署

Agency overview
- Headquarters: 26/F, Immigration Tower, 7 Gloucester Road, Wan Chai, Hong Kong
- Employees: 184
- Annual budget: HK$119,300,000 (2008-09)
- Agency executives: Mr CHU Nai-cheung, John, JP, Director of Audit; Mr PANG Kwok-sing, Deputy Director of Audit
- Website: aud.gov.hk

Audit Commission
- Traditional Chinese: 審計署
Transcriptions
Yue: Cantonese
- Yale Romanization: Sám gei chyúh
- Jyutping: Sam^{2} gai^{3} cyu^{5}

The Audit Commission (AC) is one of the oldest government departments of the Government of Hong Kong, known as Audit Department before 1 July 1997. The Director of Audit is appointed by the Chief Executive (previously the Governors of Hong Kong). The Director reports to the Chief Executive, not the Legislative Council. Its main functions are "to provide independent, professional and quality audit services to the Legislative Council and public sector organisations in order to help the Government enhance public sector performance and accountability in Hong Kong." According to the Audit Ordinance (Cap. 122) the Director of Audit "has wide powers of access to the records of departments", "can require any public officer to give an explanation and to furnish such information as he thinks fit to enable him to discharge his duties" and "is not subject to the direction or control of any other person or authority in performing his duties and when exercising his powers under the Ordinance."

The Director of Audit submits three reports each year to the President of the Legislative Council: One on the Accounts of the Government of Hong Kong Special Administrative Region under section 12 of the Audit Ordinance and two on the results of value-for-money audits.

Recently, concerns have been raised as the department has been used as a governmental tool to "deal with" departments that have not been "cooperative" to the government. Controversies have been drawn towards how the accounts of the Radio Television Hong Kong have been audited.

In April 2023, the Audit Commission said that there was a "[n]eed to step up efforts in examining library materials for safeguarding national security and talking follow-up actions." In November 2023, it said CUHK did not follow proper national security rules. An article from Hong Kong Free Press noted that the Audit Commission found that none of CUHK's 33 food outlets had a food license, despite there being no requirement on having a license.

== See also ==
- Government of Hong Kong
- Government departments and agencies in Hong Kong
- Director of Audit (Hong Kong)
