= Hong Kong ICT Awards =

- Awarded for: Information and communication technologies startup companies and solutions
- Sponsored by: Office of the Government Chief Information Officer of the Innovation and Technology Bureau of the Government of Hong Kong
- Country: Hong Kong
- Rewards: Smart Business, Digital Entertainment, FinTech, ICT Startup, Smart Living, Smart People, Smart Mobility, and Student Innovation
- First award: 2006; 20 years ago
- Final award: 2018
- Website: hkictawards.hk

Hong Kong ICT Awards is a technology-related award in Hong Kong, organised annually by the Office of the Government Chief Information Officer of the Innovation and Technology Bureau of the Government of Hong Kong.

The eight categories of the award include Smart Business, Digital Entertainment, FinTech, ICT Startup, Smart Living, Smart People, Smart Mobility, and Student Innovation. The recipients attract widespread media coverage every year.

== See also ==
- List of computer science awards
