= Government Logistics Department =

Hong Kong government department

Department overview
- Formed: 1 July 2003; 23 years ago
- Preceding agencies: Government Printer; Government Supplies Department; The Government Land Transport Agency
- Website: Official website

The Government Logistics Department (GLD) is a unit of the Hong Kong government responsible for the printing and publishing of government materials, procurement for government bureaus and departments, and some land transport operations for government departments.

The GLD took over the old role of the Government Printer in 2003. In addition to the GLD, the Hong Kong Government created the Office of the Government Chief Information Officer (OGCIO) in 2004. Since the Handover in 1997, the Hong Kong government has been promoting what it bills as "e-government". The role of the GLD is still important though, for those who do not have access to the Internet and services that still require printed material.

The GLD is the responsibility of the Secretary for Commerce and Economic Development, whereas the OGCIO is under the Financial Secretary.

== History ==
The Government Logistics Department was established through a merger of three existing government departments. The Store Department was founded in 1938, and was renamed the Government Supplies Department in 1969. The former Printing Department was established in 1952. The Government Land Transport Agency was established in 1978 as part of the Finance Branch, and became a department in 1979.

The GLD was established on 1 July 2003, combining the three departments. According to the GLD, this achieved cost savings, with the annual budget and staff establishment both being reduced between 2003–04 and 2008–09.
