= Hong Kong Academy for Gifted Education =

Non-governmental organisation in Hong Kong

- The Hong Kong Academy for Gifted Education (HKAGE)
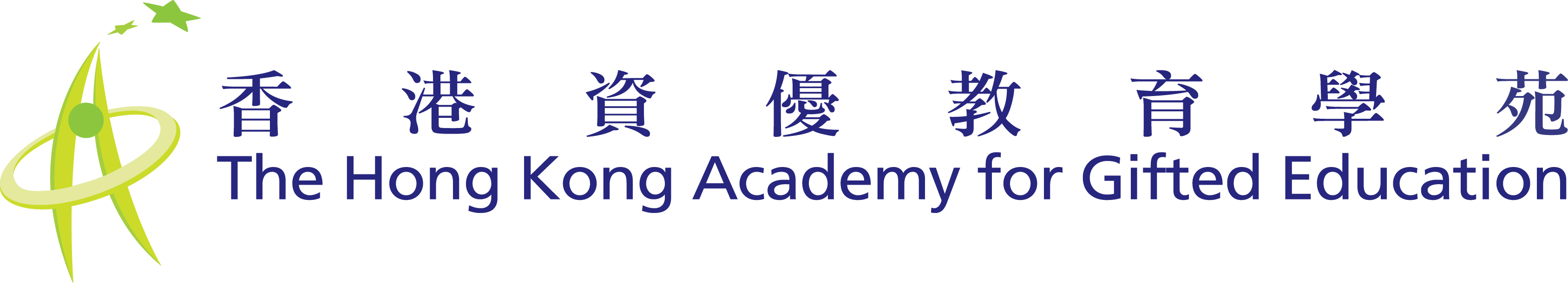
- Founded: 2007; 19 years ago
- Type: Non Governmental Organisation (NGO)
- Location: Sha Kok Estate, Sha Tin, New Territories, Hong Kong
- Executive Director: Dr Jimmy KY WONG
- Area served: Hong Kong
- Focus: Gifted education
- Motto: "Beyond Giftedness"
- Website: www.hkage.org.hk

The Hong Kong Academy for Gifted Education (HKAGE) is a non-governmental organisation that offers information, support, and learning opportunities to gifted students aged 10–18 years. It was established in 2007. HKAGE offers the majority of its programs and services to gifted students at no cost.

== History ==
Gifted education in Hong Kong started in 1990 when the development of school-based gifted education was initiated by the Education Commission Report No. 4. In the Policy Address 2006-07, Chief Executive Donald Tsang announced the establishment of the HKAGE to provide structured, articulated and challenging off-site programs for gifted students, and to promote the concepts and practices of gifted education.

The Legislative Council Panel on Education discussed in November 2006 the Administration’s proposal to provide financial support for the establishment of the HKAGE.

HKAGE was founded in 2007. HKAGE received start-up funding from the Government and Sir Joseph Hotung to support its establishment. HKAGE started the planning and preparatory work in early 2008 and delivery of programs and services at Kowloon Tong Education Services Centre in September 2008.

HKAGE moved to Sha Kok Estate in Sha Tin, adjacent to the Shing Mun River, in January 2012, to accommodate a larger capacity and improved facilities.
