= Home and Youth Affairs Bureau =

Government agency of Hong Kong

- 民政及青年事務局

Agency overview
- Formed: 1997 (Home Affairs Bureau); 2022 (re-organization)
- Jurisdiction: Government of Hong Kong
- Agency executives: Alice Mak, Secretary; Clarence Leung, Under Secretary; Shirley Lam, Permanent Secretary; Gordon Cheung, Political Assistant
- Parent department: Chief Secretary for Administration
- Website: Official Website

Home and Youth Affairs Bureau
- Traditional Chinese: 民政及青年事務局
- Simplified Chinese: 民政及青年事务局
Transcriptions
Standard Mandarin
- Hanyu Pinyin: Mínzhèng Jí Qīngnián Shìwù Jú
Yue: Cantonese
- Yale Romanization: Màhnjing kahp Chīngnìhn Sihmouh Gúk
- Jyutping: Man4 zing3 kap6 cing1 nin4 si6 mou6 guk6

The Home and Youth Affairs Bureau (Chinese: 民政及青年事務局) is a policy bureau of the Hong Kong Government. The bureau has general responsibility over local administration, with a remit covering youth affairs, family planning, women's affairs, social development, gambling regulation, fire safety, and matters related to the district councils. One of the important roles of the Home and Youth Affairs Bureau is to enhance liaison and communication with all sectors of the community including the Legislative Council and the general public. The Bureau was established on 1 July 1997 as the Home Affairs Bureau, succeeding the Home Affairs Branch (Chinese: 布政司署政務科) of the colonial government secretariat. It was reorganized at the beginning of the Lee government in 2022 as the Home and Youth Affairs Bureau, with some of its functions transferred to the new Culture, Sports and Tourism Bureau. It has its headquarters in the West Wing of the Central Government Complex in Tamar.

The bureau is headed by Alice Mak, the Secretary for Home and Youth Affairs since 2022, and is overseen by the Chief Secretary for Administration.

== History ==
=== Colonial Hong Kong (pre-1997) ===
==== Registrar-General (1844–1913) ====
The bureau has its origins in the office of Registrar-General in 1844, who led the Census and Registration Office (總登記官署) and was responsible for overseeing and regulating the Chinese community of the British colony.

==== Secretariat for Chinese Affairs (1913–1969) ====
In 1913, the Registrar-General became the Secretary for Chinese Affairs, overseeing the Secretariat for Chinese Affairs (SCA), comprising the Interpretation and Emigration sub-departments. The SCA's functions included the protection of women and girls, permits, registration of books and marriages, emigration, plague hospitals, temples, cemeteries and Chinese clubs and societies. Responsibility for the supervision of student interpreters was passed to the Education Department in June 1913. On 1 January 1922 the SCA acquired the functions of protector of child labour and inspector of factories, and an Industrial sub-department was established to administer these. The SCA became responsible for the protection of 'mui tsai' or female domestic servants in 1923 under Ordinance No 1 of 1923. Marriage registration was transferred to the Land Office in 1926. After the Second World War, the SCA was re-established on the resumption of civil administration in 1946 and continued its pre-war role, including liaison between the Chinese population and the Government and advising on Chinese law, customs and opinion. A Social Welfare Office was created within the SCA in September 1947. This was separated to form the Social Welfare Department on 1 January 1958. A Public Enquiry Service Division was formed in November 1960. Following the 1966-67 riots, the City District Office scheme was introduced on 24 January 1968.

==== Secretariat for Home Affairs (1969–1973) ====
The Secretariat for Chinese Affairs was retitled Secretariat for Home Affairs (SHA) on 28 February 1969. The name change was prompted by the introduction of the City District Office scheme in 1968. The SHA was organised into four Divisions (General and Traditional; Lands; Narcotics; Public Relations), two Sections (Trust Funds; Liquor Licensing), Tenancy Inquiries Bureaux and the City District Commissioners and District Offices for Hong Kong and Kowloon. In March 1972 a Chinese Language Branch was established to administer the official languages policy and provide translation services. The same year, a Television and Films Division was created from the Television Authority Secretariat and Film Censorship Unit, both transferred from the Information Services Department. In 1973 the SHA's liquor licensing functions were moved to the Urban Services Department, while the Narcotics Division was transferred to the Security Branch of the Colonial Secretariat.

==== Home Affairs Department (1973–1981) ====
Following a reorganisation of the Colonial Secretariat as proposed by the McKinsey Report, the Secretariat for Home Affairs was retitled as the Home Affairs Department (HAD) in September 1973. The department's primary role was maintaining communication between the Chinese population and the Government. It was organised into four Divisions (General and Traditional, Lands, Information, Television and Film), a Trust Funds Section, Chinese Language Branch, Public Relations Unit, Tenancy Enquiry Bureaux, and Offices of the City District Commissioners and District Offices for Hong Kong and Kowloon. In 1974, the Television and Film Division was separated to form an independent Television and Film Authority; the Tenancy Enquiry Bureaux were transferred to the Rating and Valuation Department; and the HAD was reorganised into a Community Services Branch and a Language and Tradition Branch and the City District Offices. In 1975 its functions included city district administration, public enquiry service, lands and housing matters, Chinese language authority, Chinese customs and liaison with local organisations.

==== City and New Territories Administration (1981–1994) ====
On 1 December 1981 the New Territories Administration merged with the Home Affairs Department to form the City and New Territories Administration (CNTA). The new department took over the functions of its antecedent agencies, except for disposal and survey of land in the New Territories which was transferred to the Lands Department, and acquired new responsibilities for the District Management Committees and District Boards. The structure of the CNTA comprised a Headquarters, four Divisions (District Administration, Departmental Administration and Finance, Information and Public Relations, and Public Enquiry Service), a Works Section and the Hong Kong and Kowloon Regions and their District Offices. Certain traditional and community related matters including temples, Chinese customs and marriages, cemeteries and opinion surveys, were transferred to the CNTA on 1 April 1985 from the Home Affairs Branch, Government Secretariat. Responsibility for community centres was also acquired from the Social Welfare Department in 1985. By 1988, CNTA had added a Special Duties Division. This was followed by a Youth Division in 1992.

==== Home Affairs Branch, Government Secretariat and Home Affairs Department (1994–1997) ====
On 1 December 1994 the CNTA was reorganised into a Home Affairs Branch in Government Secretariat and a Home Affairs Department.

=== After the Handover (post-1997) ===
==== Home Affairs Bureau (1997–2022) ====
Following the transfer of sovereignty on 1 July 1997, the organisation was renamed as the Home Affairs Bureau, headed by the Secretary for Home Affairs. The bureau gained responsibility for the culture and leisure portfolios of the Broadcasting, Culture and Sport Bureau following the latter's abolition on 9 April 1998, and following the abolition of the Urban Council, Regional Council, Urban Services Department and Regional Services Department on 31 December 1999, the bureau took over the new Leisure and Cultural Services Department, gaining even greater responsibility over leisure and cultural policy. On 1 April 2000, the Health, Welfare and Food Bureau's responsibility over sports for disabled people was transferred to the Home Affairs Bureau.

On 1 July 2007, following Donald Tsang's re-election as Chief Executive, the Home Affairs Bureau's human rights portfolio was transferred to the renamed Constitutional and Mainland Affairs Bureau, and the development-related matters of the Home Affairs Bureau's responsibility over heritage conservation were transferred to the new Development Bureau. The Home Affairs Bureau gained responsibility over the promotion of social enterprises, as well as the Legal Aid Department, which was transferred from the Chief Secretary for Administration's Office. The Legal Aid Department returned to Chief Secretary's Office on 1 July 2018.

==== Home Affairs and Youth Bureau (2022–present) ====
In her 2021 policy address, Chief Executive Carrie Lam proposed reorganizing the Home Affairs Bureau into the Home Affairs and Youth Bureau, stating that it would better address local needs and formulating policies aimed at young people. The proposal was implemented after the Lee government took office on 1 July 2022, with some of the old bureau's functions transferred to the new Culture, Sports and Tourism Bureau.

== Officials ==
The bureau has three political appointees, with principal officials in bold:

Minister	Portrait	Office	Took office
The Hon. **Alice Mak** SBS JP		Secretary for Home and Youth Affairs	1 July 2022
Clarence Leung BBS JP		Under-secretary for Home and Youth Affairs	22 July 2022
Gordon Cheung		Political assistant	1 July 2022

The Permanent Secretary is Shirley Lam who took up her post in 2022. The Bureau is divided into two branches: the Youth Affairs Branch, led by Commissioner for Youth Eric Chan, and the Home Affairs Branch, led by Deputy Secretary for Home and Youth Affairs (Home Affairs) Nick Au-Yeung.

== Responsibilities ==
Home Affairs is responsible for policies such as:

- Social Harmony and Civic Education
- District, Community and Public Relations
- Youth development

List of agencies linked to the Home and Youth Affairs Bureau:

=== Government Departments ===
- Home Affairs Department
- Information Services Department

=== Statutory and Public Bodies ===
- Property Management Services Authority
- Community Investment and Inclusion Fund
- Committee on the Promotion of Civic Education
- Youth Development Commission
- Ping Wo Fund

Unlike the ministry of home affairs of many other governments, the Home and Youth Affairs Bureau is not responsible for public security and law enforcement, which is instead under the remit of the Security Bureau.
