= Government Secretariat =

Organization comprising the government of Hong Kong

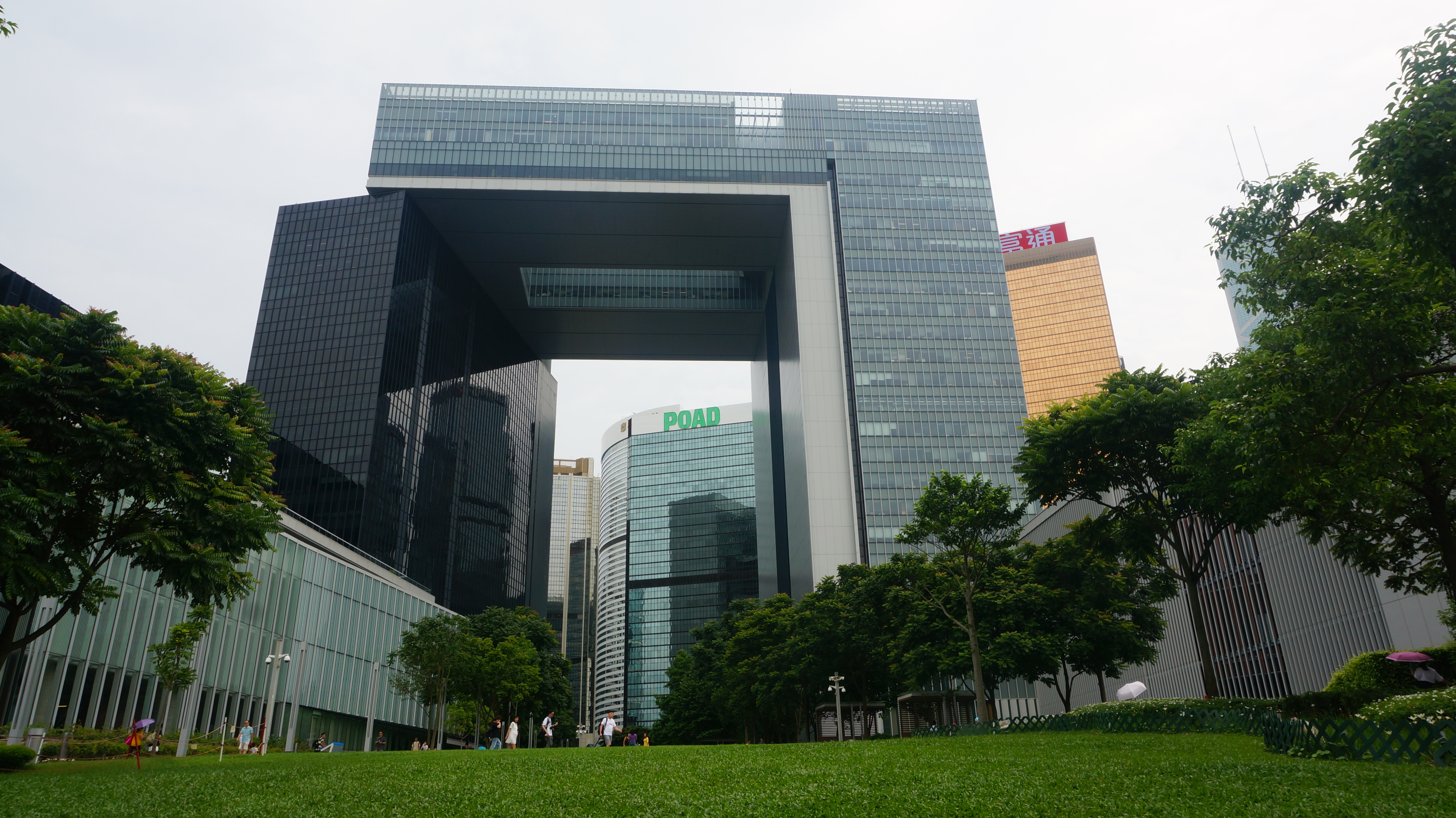
Government Secretariat view in Tamar Park

The Government Secretariat (Chinese: 政府總部) is the collective administrative headquarters of the Government of Hong Kong. It is collectively formed by the offices of the Chief Secretary and of the Financial Secretary as well as thirteen policy bureaux.

The offices are officially known as "Government Secretariat: Offices of the Chief Secretary for Administration and the Financial Secretary", and the bureaux are officially known as "[Portfolio] Bureau, Government Secretariat" or "Government Secretariat: [Portfolio] Bureau".

== Chart ==
Dept \ Year	'73	'74	'76	'81	'82	'83	'85	'88	'89	'93	'94	'97	'98	'00	'02	'07	'15	'22
Education	Social Services					Education and Manpower									Education and Manpower	Education		
Labour	Social Services					Education and Manpower									Economic Development and Labour	Labour and Welfare		
Welfare	Social Services					Health and Welfare									Health, Welfare and Food	Labour and Welfare		
Health	Social Services					Health and Welfare									Health, Welfare and Food	Food and Health		Health
Food, Hygiene	Urban Council & Regional Council (non-government)													Environment and Food	Health, Welfare and Food	Food and Health		Environment and Ecology
Environment	Environment			Lands and Works					Planning, Environment and Lands					Environment and Food	Environment, Transport and Works	Environment		Environment and Ecology
Lands	Environment			Lands and Works					Planning, Environment and Lands					Planning and Lands	Housing, Planning and Lands	Development		
Works	Environment			Lands and Works					Public Works						Environment, Transport and Works	Development		
Transport	Environment			Transport											Environment, Transport and Works	Transport and Housing		Transport and Logistics
Housing	Housing								Home Affairs		Housing				Housing, Planning and Lands	Transport and Housing		Housing
Technology													Information Technology and Broadcasting		Commerce, Industry and Technology	Commerce and Economic Development	Innovation and Technology	Innovation, Technology and Industry
Industry					Trade and Industry									Commerce and Industry	Commerce, Industry and Technology	Commerce and Economic Development		Innovation, Technology and Industry
Business					Trade and Industry									Commerce and Industry	Commerce, Industry and Technology	Commerce and Economic Development		Commerce and Economic Development
Broadcast	Home Affairs								Broadcasting, Culture and Sport				Information Technology and Broadcasting		Commerce, Industry and Technology	Commerce and Economic Development		Commerce and Economic Development
Economy	Economic Services														Economic Development and Labour	Commerce and Economic Development		Commerce and Economic Development
Tourism	Home Affairs														Economic Development and Labour	Commerce and Economic Development		Culture, Sports and Tourism
Culture, Sports	Urban Council & Regional Council (non-government)						Municipal Services		Broadcasting, Culture and Sport				Home Affairs					Culture, Sports and Tourism
Home affairs	Home Affairs						District Administration		Home Affairs									Home and Youth Affairs
Local admin.	Home Affairs	New Territories Administration		City and New Territories Administration		District Administration			Home Affairs									Home and Youth Affairs
Finance			Monetary Affairs							Financial Services					Financial Services and the Treasury			
Treasury	Dep. Financial Sec.								Treasury						Financial Services and the Treasury			
Constitution							Dep. Chief Sec.		Constitutional Affairs							Constitutional and Mainland Affairs		
Security	Security																	
Civil service	Civil Service																	

== History ==
The structure of the Government Secretariat has undergone periodic changes.

=== Early colonial history ===
The Colonial Secretariat was established in the 1840s as the Colonial Secretary's department, and was directly composed of the government's various departments, including the Public Works Department and the Secretariat for Chinese Affairs. This structure allowed power to be heavily concentrated at the top, in the offices of the Colonial Secretary and Financial Secretary. In the pre-war years, the smaller size of the government allowed even the most senior officials to keep track of both important policy issues and relatively trivial administrative matters, meaning that they could act quickly and decisively. Principal assistant colonial secretaries in the Colonial Secretary's office were responsible for coordinating policy and administrative matters, with the heads of departments being some of the most senior civil servants in the colony.

=== The McKinsey Report ===
Governor Sir Murray MacLehose commissioned McKinsey & Company to conduct a study on the structure of the Hong Kong Government. MacLehose subsequently restructured the Colonial Secretariat pursuant to recommendations in the McKinsey Report in 1973, adding a new layer of "branches" between the Colonial Secretary and the departments. The new branches, led by policy secretaries, would be primarily responsible for formulating policy, while the departments would continue to conduct day-to-day operations. The basic three-tier structure created by Governor MacLehose still exists largely unchanged today.

Branches of the Government Secretariat under the Colonial Secretary:

- Environment Branch (-1981)
- Home Affairs Branch
- Social Services Branch
- Housing Branch
- Security Branch
- Civil Service Branch
- New Territories Branch (1974-)
- Administration Branch (1975-1978)

Branches of the Government Secretariat under the Financial Secretary:

- Financial Branch (-1976); replaced by the Monetary Affairs Branch (1976-)
- Economic Services Branch

The Colonial Secretariat was renamed as the Government Secretariat in 1976, following the decision to retitle the Colonial Secretary as the Chief Secretary.

=== Reorganisation in the 1980s ===
New branches of the Government Secretariat were established in the 1980s.

Branches of the Government Secretariat under the Chief Secretary:

- Environment Branch (-1981)
- Home Affairs Branch
- Social Services Branch (-1983); replaced by the Health & Welfare Branch (1983-)
- Housing Branch
- Security Branch
- Civil Service Branch
- New Territories Branch (-1981); replaced by the City & N.T. Administration Branch (1981-1983) and renamed the District Administration Branch (1983-)
- News Branch (1979-1981)
- Education Branch (1980-1983); renamed the Education & Manpower Branch (1983-)
- Transport Branch (1981-)
- Lands & Works Branch (1981-)
- General Duties Branch (1982-)
- Municipal Services Branch (1985-)

Branches of the Government Secretariat under the Financial Secretary:

- Economic Services Branch
- Monetary Affairs Branch (1976-)
- Trade & industry Branch (1982-)

=== 1989 reorganisation ===
In the 1 September 1989 reorganisation, the Recreation and Culture Branch (RCB) was created, taking on some duties from the Municipal Services Branch, such as for culture and recreation, sports, antiquities and country parks management, and others from the Administrative Services and Information Branch, including broadcasting, entertainment and censorship policy. Both branches then ceased to exist. The RCB operated as a Broadcasting, Entertainment and Administration wing, which covered RTHK and TELA, and the Recreation and Culture wing, with responsibilities including sport.

Branches of the Government Secretariat under the Chief Secretary:

- General Duties Branch (-1990)
- Constitutional Affairs Branch
- Education & Manpower Branch
- Civil Service Branch
- Home Affairs Branch
- Planning, Environment & Lands Branch
- Broadcasting, Culture & Sports Branch
- Security Branch
- Health & Welfare Branch
- Transport Branch
- Housing Branch (1994-)

Branches of the Government Secretariat under the Financial Secretary:

- Finance Branch
- Works Branch
- Economic Services Branch
- Monetary Affairs Branch (-1993); replaced by the Financial Services Branch (1993-)
- Trade & industry Branch

=== Structure of the Government Secretariat, 1997-2002 ===
Branches of the Government Secretariat under the Chief Secretary for Administration:

- Education Bureau
- Constitutional Affairs Bureau
- Civil Service Bureau
- Home Affairs Bureau
- Planning, Environment and Lands Bureau (1997–99); renamed the Planning and Lands Bureau (2000-)
- Environment and Food Bureau (2000-)
- Housing Bureau
- Security Bureau
- Health and Welfare Bureau
- Transport Bureau

Bureaux under the Financial Secretary:

- Broadcasting, Culture and Sports Bureau (1997–98)
- Information Technology and Broadcast Bureau (1998-)
- Works Bureau
- Economic Services Bureau
- Finance Bureau
- Financial Services Bureau
- Trade and Industry Bureau

=== Structure of policy bureaux, 2002-2007 ===
The Government Secretariat was reorganised in Tung Chee-hwa's second term upon the implementation of the Principal Officials Accountability System on 1 July 2002:

- Civil Service Bureau
- Commerce, Industry and Technology Bureau
- Constitutional Affairs Bureau
- Economic Development and Labour Bureau
- Education and Manpower Bureau
- Environment, Transport and Works Bureau
- Financial Services and the Treasury Bureau
- Health, Welfare and Food Bureau
- Home Affairs Bureau
- Housing, Planning and Lands Bureau
- Security Bureau

=== Structure of policy bureaux, 2007-2022 ===
A reorganisation of the secretariat was announced by Donald Tsang after his re-election as Chief Executive in 2007. The number of policy bureaux was increased from 11 to 12 as a consequence of this re-organisation; minor adjustments were also made to the responsibilities of the principal officials. Then-Chief Executive Leung Chun-ying established the Innovation and Technology Bureau in 2015.

Bureaux under the Chief Secretary for Administration:

- Civil Service Bureau
- Constitutional and Mainland Affairs Bureau
- Education Bureau
- Environment Bureau
- Food and Health Bureau
- Home Affairs Bureau
- Labour and Welfare Bureau
- Security Bureau
- Transport and Housing Bureau

Bureaux under the Financial Secretary:

- Commerce and Economic Development Bureau
- Development Bureau
- Financial Services and the Treasury Bureau
- Innovation and Technology Bureau (2015-)

== Present structure (2022-) ==
Pursuant to the 2021 Policy address, Carrie Lam announced a government restructuring proposal in January 2022 to be considered and implemented by the Chief Executive-elect returned by the 2022 Chief Executive election. The proposal was adopted by Chief Executive-elect John Lee Ka-chiu; requisite funding was approved by the Finance Committee of the Legislative Council on 10 June 2022.

Bureaux under the Chief Secretary for Administration:

- Civil Service Bureau
- Constitutional and Mainland Affairs Bureau
- Culture, Sports and Tourism Bureau
- Education Bureau
- Environment and Ecology Bureau
- Health Bureau
- Home and Youth Affairs Bureau
- Labour and Welfare Bureau
- Security Bureau

Bureaux under the Financial Secretary:

- Commerce and Economic Development Bureau
- Development Bureau
- Financial Services and the Treasury Bureau
- Housing Bureau
- Innovation, Technology & Industry Bureau
- Transport and Logistics Bureau

== Reorganisation Proposals ==
=== 2012 Proposal ===
In April 2012, Chief Executive-elect Leung Chun-ying announced his plan to reform the government, "aimed at providing better service to the public while boosting governance". Under the plan, two more deputy secretaries are to be created – a new deputy chief secretary and deputy financial secretary – to join the chief secretary, financial secretary, and secretary for justice. Leung announced his desire to create a Culture Bureau; Housing and Transport would be split into two bureaux and Housing would merge with Lands and planning. The newly created Deputy chief secretary position will be responsible for the Labour and Welfare, Education and cultural affairs bureaux. The Chief Secretary is to oversee the environment, Food and health, Home affairs, Security, Civil service, and Constitutional and mainland affairs. The Financial Secretary is to oversee Housing, planning and lands, Works, Transport and Financial Services and the treasury bureaux. The Deputy financial secretary will be in overall charge of the Commerce, industrial and tourism, as well as the Information and technology bureaux. To allow for a smooth transition, the government agreed to table Leung's restructuring plan before LegCo before it dissolved for the summer. However, Pan Democrats believed careful scrutiny was necessary, and strongly opposed the plan to rush through the changes; People Power representatives in Legco warned they would table some 900 motions at the Finance Committee meeting on 15 June and over 100 amendments at the plenary council meeting on 20 June.

Bureaux under the Chief Secretary for Administration:

- Civil Service Bureau
- Constitutional and Mainland Affairs Bureau
- Environment Bureau
- Food and Health Bureau
- Home Affairs Bureau
- Security Bureau

Bureaux under the Deputy Chief Secretary for Administration:

- Education Bureau
- Labour and Welfare Bureau
- Culture Bureau

Bureaux under the Financial Secretary:

- Financial Services and the Treasury Bureau
- Housing, Planning and Lands Bureau
- Transport and Works Bureau

Bureaux under the Deputy Financial Secretary:

- Commerce and Industries Bureau
- Technology and Communication Bureau

== See also ==
- Politics of Hong Kong
- Government departments and agencies in Hong Kong
