= Secretary for District Administration =

The Secretary for District Administration (Chinese: 政務司), formerly known as Secretary for City and New Territories Administration, was a senior government post in the Government of Hong Kong in 1980s, which was responsible for local administrative issues.

In 1974, "District Commissioner, New Territories" (Chinese: 新界民政署長), which the post was responsible for coordinating New Territories issues, was renamed and elevated to a secretariat level post, being Secretary for the New Territories (Chinese: 新界政務司), reflecting the importance of the position.

The new position, Secretary for City and New Territories, was created in December 1981 to replace the Secretary for the New Territories. The Secretary for City and New Territories Administration took over the responsibilities of City and New Territories Administration, merger of District Office and City District Office. Duties related to policy of the City and New Territories Administration which were handled by Secretary for Home Affairs was also transferred to the new secretary.

In 1985, the Secretary for District Administration, rebranded in 1983, replaced the Secretary for Home Affairs and to oversee traditions and community affairs. In 1989, the position was again renamed as Secretary for Home Affairs, ending the history of the position.

During 1975 and 1978, the post Secretary for Administration existed and shared a similar name, but was responsible for the efficiency of the government instead of local affairs.

== List of office holders ==
=== Secretary for the New Territories Administration, 1974–1981 ===
No.	Portrait	Name	Term of office		Governor	Ref
1		David Akers-Jones 鍾逸傑	1 April 1974	30 November 1981	Sir Murray MacLehose (1971–1982)	

=== Secretary for City and New Territories Administration, 1981–1983 ===
No.	Portrait	Name	Term of office		Governor	Ref
1		David Akers-Jones 鍾逸傑	1 December 1981	31 January 1983	Sir Murray MacLehose (1971–1982)	
1		David Akers-Jones 鍾逸傑	1 December 1981	31 January 1983	Sir Edward Youde (1982–1986)	

=== Secretaries for District Administration, 1983–1989 ===
No.	Portrait	Name	Term of office		Governor	Ref
1		David Akers-Jones 鍾逸傑	1 February 1983	10 February 1985	Sir Edward Youde (1982–1986)	
2		Donald Liao 廖本懷	11 February 1985	31 August 1989	Sir Edward Youde (1982–1986)	
2		Donald Liao 廖本懷	11 February 1985	31 August 1989	Sir David Wilson (1987–1992)	
