= Efficiency Office =

Hong Kong government department

- 效率促進辦公室

Agency overview
- Formed: 1992
- Jurisdiction: Government of Hong Kong
- Headquarters: 14/F, Treasury Building, 3 Tonkin Street West, Cheung Sha Wan, Kowloon, Hong Kong
- Agency executives: Lee Kwok Bun, Ivan, Commissioner for Efficiency; Li Kwok Chi Kit, Judy, Deputy Commissioner for Efficiency
- Parent department: Innovation, Technology and Industry Bureau
- Website: Official Website

Efficiency Office (EffO, Chinese: 效率促進辦公室) is a government department under the Innovation, Technology and Industry Bureau of the Government of Hong Kong. It is a management consulting agency in the SAR government structure, providing suggestions of general consulting, resource management and information technology for different SAR government departments and agencies.

The Office was founded in May 1992, previously known as the Efficiency Unit, as an agency under the Chief Secretary's Office (renamed as Chief Secretary for Administration's Office after the handover). On 1 April 2018, the Unit was reallocated under Innovation and Technology Bureau, later the Innovation, Technology and Industry Bureau, and renamed as the Efficiency Office.

== History ==
In 1972, Governor Murray MacLehose commissioned McKinsey & Company to conduct a brief examination of the machinery of government in Hong Kong. The report, commonly known as the “McKinsey Report”, found that the colonial government's efforts to expand services were diluted by the continuing decline in skilled and experienced staff. It was therefore recommended that the government should be divided into secretariat branches for policy formulation and departments for implementation, while improving personnel management by opening senior positions to all grades and introducing the merit-based promotion system. Governor MacLehose later proposed to develop the civil servants’ expertise in modern corporate management in his 1973 policy address.

In February 1989, the Finance Branch set out concrete proposals for public sector reform, aiming to enhance the efficiency of public service management and delivery. These suggestions include the use of trading funds and statutory corporations, as well as outsourcing.

The Efficiency Unit, the predecessor agency of EffO, was established in May 1992, with Robert Footman as its inaugural Head. Its staff consisted mainly of civil servants from different professional and management backgrounds so as to work on strategic issues across government agencies, including identifying opportunities, devising solutions, and promoting and coordinating reforms. Similarly, the Management Services Agency was founded in September 1993 to provide management and technology consultancy support to bureaux and departments when implementing service improvements. In July 2002, both the Efficiency Unit and the Management Services Agency were merged into a single unit to streamline the management structure for enhanced flexibility in carrying out the reform agenda and responding to changing demands.

The Efficiency Unit published the Code on Access to Information, as well as companion guides for human resource management, public finance, and civil service training. In July 2001, the Efficiency Unit launched the 1823 call centre, a 24-hour one-stop hotline service, to answer public enquiries and receive complaints for some 20 participating government departments.

In 2004, the Efficiency Unit underwent an internal review that led to its repositioning wherein it assumed the role as the “preferred consulting partner” for all government bureaux and departments. Since then, the Efficiency Unit has rolled out the Customer Management Assessment Framework (CMAF) for customer-facing agencies to improve and assess customer-oriented services. Besides providing advisory services, the Efficiency Unit also conducted research on new public management concepts, where it produced user guides, reports and newsletters, and organised seminars and training sessions for civil servants. In 2010, the Efficiency Unit organised the “Public Sector Reform Conference – Public Service 2020” to discuss new challenges from ageing population, increased automation, higher expectations, and constitutional development.

Moreover, the Efficiency Unit collaborated with other government agencies and other external bodies. Examples include launching the Youth Portal with RTHK to promote young people's access to government information and public services, the “Be the Smart Regulator Programme” with the Economic Analysis and Business Facilitation Unit (EABFU) to improve licensing systems, as well as the General Management Consultancy (GMC) Services Portal to help government agencies procure management consultants. Together with the Commission on Poverty, the Efficiency Unit started the Social Innovation and Entrepreneurship Development (SIE) Fund to support innovative social entrepreneurship in meeting underserved needs and promote social inclusion, such as a gerontechnology platform, social impact bonds, food support projects, etc. Starting from 2015, the SIE Fund encourages businesses to adopt Created Shared Value (CSV) business models to align business returns with community advancements.

To mark its 20th anniversary, the Efficiency Unit was united at its current office in 2012, which was designed to provide a staff-friendly and collaborative workspace with a comprehensive Enterprise Information Management System.

On 1 April 2018, the Efficiency Unit was transferred to the Innovation and Technology Bureau from the Chief Secretary for Administration's Office, and also renamed as the Efficiency Office (EffO). Meanwhile, the Business Facilitation Division under EABFU was moved to EffO for greater synergy and efficiency. The inaugural Commissioner for Efficiency was Olivia Nip, who served from 2017 to 2020.

In the future, EffO endeavours to streamline government services and engage new intermediaries for the SIE Fund. It also seeks to upgrade the 1823 hotline service during the COVID-19 pandemic and accelerate the use of innovation and technology in public service delivery.

== Organisation and Management ==
The Commissioner for Efficiency The Commissioner for Efficiency is responsible for promoting the adoption of technology and innovations in business methods to improve the quality and effectiveness of public services in meeting community needs. On one hand, he fulfils his responsibilities by being the head of EffO and, on the other hand, he builds strong partnerships with bureaux and departments, external partners and stakeholders to identify ideas for service improvement, develop and test innovations and scale up implementation of successful projects. He is assisted by a Deputy Commissioner and seven Assistant Commissioners in discharging his duties.

The current Commissioner is Mr LEE Kwok Bun, Ivan and Deputy Commissioner is Mrs LI KWOK Chi Kit, Judy.

Head, Efficiency Unit

1. Robert Footman (霍文: May 1992 — November 1995)

2. Colin Sankey (冼兢; January 1996 — October 2003)

3. Duncan Pescod (柏志高; November 2004 — February 2006)

4. Kitty Choi Kit-yu (蔡潔如; April 2006 — August 2009)

5. Kim Anthony Salkeld (蘇啟龍; August 2009 — November 2017)

6. Olivia Nip Sai-lan (聶世蘭; December 2017 — March 2018)

Commissioner for Efficiency

1. Olivia Nip Sai-lan (聶世蘭; April 2018 — December 2020)

2. Ivan Lee Kwok Bun (李國彬; December 2020 — present)

Management Services Officers Grade

Management Services Officers (MSOs) are the main members of the Efficiency Office. As management consultants, MSOs help policy bureaux and departments find opportunities for improvement, facilitate and implement change, and accelerate innovation and technology adoption for better services. Types of consultancies include business process re-engineering, departmental management reviews, organisational review, performance measurement, design thinking, knowledge management, shared services, public sector innovation, information technology application studies, streamlining of government services and review on business facilitation as well as market and financial analysis.

MSOs may be posted to work in different policy bureaux and departments of the Government. They work in close partnership with colleagues of different grades in providing service in the areas of general consulting, resource management and other fields.

Functions

EffO is divided into seven teams. The functions of these seven teams, each headed by an Assistant Commissioner, are :

a. Business Facilitation Team: This team provides secretariat support to the Business Facilitation Advisory Committee and its task forces, manages the “Be the Smart Regulator” Programme and deals with the promotion of business facilitation culture and World Bank's doing business ranking.

b. Team 1: This team is responsible for design thinking, consultancy, general management consultancy support and management services officer grade management.

c. Team 2: This team is responsible for 1823, change management and promotion of innovation and technology adoption in the Government.

d. Team 3: This team is responsible for management and administration of the Social Innovation and Entrepreneurship Development Fund (SIE Fund) and service quality related survey.

e. Team 4: This team is responsible for Youth Portal and marketing and communication of the SIE Fund.

f. Team 5: This team is responsible for streamlining of Government Services Programme and consultancy.

g. Admin Team: This team is responsible for administrative and IT support, human and financial resources management and administrative and committee support to SIE Fund.

== Duties and Operations / Service and facilities ==
Management Consultancy

EffO's duties in management consultancy can be further divided into 10 key areas:

a. Streamlining of Government Services Programme:

The Streamlining of Government Services Programme (SGSP) was launched in mid-2019 with a view of improving government services involving applications and approvals. SGSP enhances the convenience, efficiency and transparency of government services through streamlining business processes and widening the adoption of technology. Streamlining measures under SGSP focus on streamlining business processes, reducing documentation requirements, improving service channels, and strengthening communications.

SGSP has assisted different government bureaux and departments in the past 2 years. In 2019–2020, 36 bureaux and departments have proposed a total of 74 streamlining measures under SGSP. In 2020–21, 38 bureaux and departments have proposed a total of 80 streamlining measures under SGSP. Examples of measures under SGSP include the introduction of travel document submission kiosks at the Immigration Headquarters and immigration branch offices, the development of an electronic platform for receiving applications for various subsidised sale flats schemes, and the upgrading of computer systems to allow one-stop retrieval and printing of electronic vaccination records.

b. Business Process Re-engineering:

Business process re-engineering involves rethinking and redesigning the service delivery processes at government bureaux and departments. EffO examines existing processes and their underlying objectives in the re-engineering process and provides support in both consultation and implementation of new measures.

Examples of business process re-engineering projects led by the EffO include a re-engineering Study on Postal Clearance System of the Customs and Excise Department and the Implementation of e-Service for Permit Application System (ePAS) of the Transport Department.

c. Organisational Review:

Organisational review involves reviewing the organisation's structure in light of its change of responsibilities and public demand for its services. Through organisational review, EffO aims to reduce costs, ensure adequate and efficient use of resources, enhance staff capacity and increase the organisation's ability to respond to future changes.

Ways of organisation review supported by EffO include supporting Principal Officials in the reviews of policy bureaux and departments, reviewing and redesigning existing organisational structure, functions, roles and responsibilities with reference to other existing models, and providing services or resources to support transition to the new or re-organised structure. One example of EffO's work in organisational review is the review of the Marine Department in 2013, through which the EffO identified improvement areas, made recommendations and developed the recommendations with the Marine Department.

d. Performance Measurement:

With an aim of providing users of public services with information about the service standards and enabling the providers of public services to identify the service quality or areas that should be maintained or improved, EffO assists bureaux and departments in developing effective performance measurement mechanisms. In developing performance measurement mechanisms, EffO's work includes giving advice on setting up vision, mission and values statements, launching performance pledges, sharing of best practices in performance management through workshops and reports and by publishing guidelines.

An example of performance measurement is the Hong Kong Government Service Excellence Index, which measures public satisfaction with the quality and efficiency of public services. Since 2009, EffO has commissioned an independent organisation to conduct an annual survey on citizens’ views on their experience with public service delivery. As a point of comparison, a matching survey of public satisfaction with private service delivery has been introduced since 2011.

e. Design Thinking:

Design thinking refers to a structured and collaborative process through which staff and stakeholders are engaged to co-create services and improve service experience. The design thinking process aims to enhance public service quality and efficiency and meet public needs in the delivery of public services.

EffO has participated in several design thinking projects. One example is the Hongkong Post User Research and User Centred Design Pilot Project, through which EffO revamped the Mongkok Post Office with the Hong Kong Design Centre . Another example is the design of the Hong Kong Exhibition Area in China International Import Expo 2018, during which EffO collaborated with 12 bureaux/departments in co-designing the design principles and key design elements from the perspectives of visitors. EffO has also assisted the Commerce and Economic Development Bureau in designing a workshop which explored how the Government could better support SMEs to cope with challenges of the external economic environment and the pressure of economic downturn. In addition, EffO participated in the “user experience design” phase of the design of the “iAM Smart” Mobile App, through which it invited citizens of different age groups, education levels and occupations, including people with disabilities, to participate in a number of co-design workshops for the mobile app. The workshops allowed Government developers to understand more about mobile app user habits, and views and expectations on “iAM Smart”.

f. Change Management:

Change management refers to the process in which present stakeholders are prepared and equipped to adapt to new changes in organisational structure and service delivery. EffO provides assistance to bureaux and departments in developing a structured process to help their staff understand the need for change, co-design the detailed changes, and implement and adopt the changes. Upon request from bureaux and departments, it also arranges and provides training and support in adjusting to the new practices to staff members.

One example of EffO's work in this area is the full implementation of the electronic recordkeeping system, during which bureaux and departments adapted to the new electronic recordkeeping system as opposed to the traditional paper-based recordkeeping method. EffO developed a suite of practical tools to facilitate this transition, ranging from workshops and briefings to experience sharing sessions and on-going advisory services.

g. Knowledge Management:

Knowledge management involves the management of information and records in the Government. EffO runs the electronic information management (EIM) programme to help bureaux and departments improve knowledge, information and records management and to facilitate internal collaboration. The EIM programme aims to help bureaux and departments enhance the accessibility of information, thereby improving the capacity of bureaux and departments to learn, innovate, and deliver quality public services.

h. Shared Services:

Shared Services is a service delivery model which aims to enhance service quality and productivity by consolidating and transferring similar tasks or work processes across multiple agencies to a shared services platform. It consolidates and rationalises resources and work procedures, which thus reduces costs and enhances efficiency in service delivery.

An example of shared services developed by EffO is its development of Trade Single Window in Hong Kong with the Single Window Project Management Office under the Commerce and Economic Development Bureau. The Trade Single Window is a platform which allows one-stop lodging of all trade documents from the trading community to the Government. The development of this platform facilitates trade declaration and customs clearance.

i. Public Sector Innovation:

Public sector innovation refers to innovating the approach, work processes and service delivery model applied in bureaux and departments . It aims to enhance the impact, administration, management and quality of public service delivery .

EffO's work in public sector innovation focuses particularly on effective deployment of new technologies, data analytics and open data, stakeholder management, human resources management and transformation, procurement reform, social impact investment, shared services and value for money analysis.

j. General Management Consultancy Support:

General management consultancy support provided by EffO involves connecting government bureaux and departments with external management consultancy firms. The General Management Consultancy Services Portal allows Bureaux and departments to access detailed information on the registered general management consulting firms and procure appropriate services accordingly.

EffO monitors the performance of management consulting firms by maintaining a register of firms, participating in selection and negotiation processes between the firms and relevant bureaux or departments, and participating in project steering groups to monitor performance of the selected consultants. Besides, it also provides technical and administrative support to bureaux and departments on hiring and use of management consultants, for example through giving advice on the background, experience and areas of specialisation of management consulting firms registered with Efficiency Office.

Citizen-centric Services

Four key services can be found under the citizen-centric services.

a. 1823

Established in 2001, 1823 originally handled enquiries and complaints related to five departments. With continuous development, 1823 has become a one-stop hotline service available round-the-clock to answer citizens’ general enquiries on behalf of the 23 participating departments. 1823 also receives complaints and recommendations regarding Government service. 1823 will provide answers directly for enquiries concerning the participating departments, while only contact information is provided for enquiries relevant to other departments. 1823 may record the details of complaints and recommendations for further referral to the relevant departments, such that citizens need not identify the responsible department. While it is the department which decides whether to follow up, 1823 will monitor the whole progress including the department's reply and convey its reply to the complainants if necessary. Other than calls, 1823 handles inquiries and complaints from written channels, namely email, mobile app, web form and SMS. The official website of 1823 offers written responses to frequently asked topics and a Chatbot is also available to answer simple public enquiries.

b. Youth.gov.hk

Aimed at offering youth-related public services information delivered by various departments and other related organisations and engaging young people, Youth.gov.hk is set up to disseminate information on its official website as well as social media platforms (Facebook, YouTube and Instagram). EffO has been collaborating with different stakeholders to co-create content which suits the needs of young people.

Key areas of focus include career and study, entrepreneurship, and cultural and creative activities. A list of upcoming activities and cover stories with a diversity of interests are updated frequently, providing youngsters with fresh insights.

c. Social Innovation

To alleviate poverty and social exclusion as well as foster the well-being and cohesion of the society, the Government allocated $500 million to promote social innovation and nurture social entrepreneurship in 2013. A Social Innovation and Entrepreneurship Development Fund (SIE Fund) was then established as a Trust Fund. It was incorporated under the Secretary for Home Affairs and is overseen by the EffO. Under the Commission on Poverty, an SIE Fund Task Force was also set up to advise on policies and procedures of the operation and administration of the SIE Fund in late 2012. Benefitting Hong Kong residents who are in need of poverty alleviation and prevention of social exclusion, SIE Fund subsidises selected Innovative Programmes and Capacity Building programmes in the form of grants.

Studies have revealed that SIE Fund has made considerable contributions to the development of the local social innovation ecosystem. A total of around 400 funded projects have reached over 303,000 beneficiaries up to March 2022.

d. One Stop Centre for Warehouse Construction Permits

The One Stop Centre (OSC) for Warehouse Construction Permits was established in 2008 as an integral part of the Government's "Be the Smart Regulator" Programme (see below), which aims to streamline licensing processes and reduce compliance costs for businesses. As an alternative to the existing procedures of application submission and inspections application, OSC provides a centralised office for receiving submissions of plans and applications in the pre and post-construction stages, coordinating joint inspections for two-storey warehouses.

Reforms and streamlining efforts have been made in various departments. They are the Buildings Department, Fire Services Department and Highways Department .

Business Facilitation

EffO is responsible for several working groups and measures to facilitate business development in Hong Kong.

a. Business Facilitation Advisory Committee and Its Task Forces

To carry on the function of the former Economic and Employment Council, Business Facilitation Advisory Committee (BFAC) was established in January 2006. BAFC reviews regulations and procedures impacting businesses and reports to the Financial Secretary to facilitate business compliance with government regulations. Together with 3 task forces (Wholesale and Retail Task Force, Food Business and Related Services Task Force, and Task Force on Business Liaison Groups ) and 10 business liaison groups (see below), BFAC offers industries a platform to communicate with government departments. They may reflect on regulatory matters, addressing implementation issues of new or proposed regulations. Past efforts contributed to cutting red tape, removing obsolete or burdensome regulations, improving regulatory efficiency, transparency, and business-friendliness, and lessening regulatory impact and compliance costs to businesses.

Its recent work includes Public Consultation on the Producer Responsibility Scheme on Plastic Beverage Container, Public Consultation on Proposed Amendments to Waterworks Ordinance, Smart City Blueprint for Hong Kong 2.0.

b. Business Liaison Groups

Business Liaison Groups (BLGs) are established as formal discussion forums to strengthen communication between the Government and the business community. During regular meetings of BLGs, representatives from Government and different sectors would exchange views regarding trade on licensing and operational regulatory issues. Timely feedback would be provided in response to these issues.

Currently, there are 10 BLGs. They cover sectors like cinemas, theme parks and attractions, recreational clubs, and hotels.

c. Business Consultation e-Platform

Under the GovHK portal, a business consultation e-Platform has been developed. It allows business sectors to access consultation information about proposed regulations, administrative measures and procedures that would impact business. They can offer their views and comments on different areas. Examples of past consultation include safety standards for toys and children's products, Mandatory Energy Efficiency Labelling Scheme and amendments to the limits for harmful residues in Chinese herbal medicines.

d. Be the Smart Regulator Programme

The "Be the Smart Regulator" Programme was launched in 2007 in order to improve the business licensing environment by enhancing efficiency, transparency, and customer friendliness of the Government's licensing services, as well as lowering the business compliance costs. The Programme covers more than 400 business licences involving 29 bureaux and departments. Some common revolving themes include regulatory review, efficiency, transparency, and business-friendliness. Streamlining, use of IT, and improving guidance on licence applications are the three most common business facilitation measures imposed by the participating bureau and departments from 2018-to 2021.

Promotion of IT Adoption in the Government

EffO collaborates with the I&T sector to help bureaux and departments (B/Ds) build awareness and knowledge of the latest technologies and innovations in the market. By doing so, it aims to facilitate the implementation of pro-innovation government procurement policy and accelerate the use of innovation and technology (I&T) in public service delivery.

EffO organises promotional events to enhance the awareness and knowledge of bureaux and departments on the latest technologies and innovations in the market. Examples of these events include the Innovation and Technology Solution Day 2021, the Innovation and Technology Trade Show Live 2020 F/W, and the Innovation and Technology Trade Show 2019 S/S.

== Relevant events/Controversies ==
Criticism towards the 1823 Call Centre

Since the establishment of the Integrated Call Centre (ICC) (old name of 1823 call centre), the Office of the Ombudsman received complaints about its operation, the Ombudsman therefore initiated a direct investigation and released the report in 2003. The Ombudsman approved that ICC brought ‘financial, management and efficiency gains’ when compared to those former departmental hotlines, and recommendations on areas like work allocation and accountability were provided for further improvement. The Efficiency Unit (EU) (old name of Efficiency Office) accepted and implemented most recommendations.

However, the Ombudsman continued to receive new complaints about ICC, so another investigation report was published in 2008. The Ombudsman commented that ICC was far from its goal of an integrated one-step service as ICC only served one-third of all government departments. ICC also suffered from the problem of manpower shortage and was unable to identify responsible departments when facing cross-departmental complaints. The EU responded that it would be robust with its approach to handling cross-departmental complaints and implemented all recommendations from the Ombudsman.

In recent years, critics turned to 1823 Call Centre's failure to fulfil its overall performance pledge. The Call Centre targets to answer 80% of calls within 12 seconds. Nonetheless, as early as 2008, the Ombudsman revealed that ICC failed to achieve this target in the past four years (2004-2007), only managing to answer between 62% and 78% within the timeframe each year. Some claimed it was due to manpower shortage and poor management of the Call Centre. In 2017 and 2018, only 71% and 67% of calls were answered within 12 seconds respectively, the EffO attributed the failure to surges in call volume because of individual issues like the Home Ownership Scheme, and continued tight manpower situation, more trainings, recruitment exercises and user-friendly practices will be introduced to tackle the problem. The performance of the Call Centre slightly improved to 68% in 2019. However, the percentage dropped in 2020 due to the increase in call volume brought by COVID-19 related issues and the effect of special work arrangements for government employees. According to the latest data from January to March 2022, only 39% of calls are answered within 12 seconds.

“Food Waste” Accusation regarding Youth.com's Facebook live

In 2017, the Youth.gov.hk (YP) managed by the EffO published a live video on Facebook. In the live video, the two editors competed to eat 100 pieces of Shumais in 30 minutes, another editor even yelled that ‘People in Africa are starving’ in the video. The speed-eating video brought huge criticism from the public. Environmental group Food Grace commented that the video encouraged food waste. YP later made an official apology and explained that they did not intend to waste food. No Shumai was wasted as all Shumais were consumed by the editorial team.

“Unsung heroes”

On 1 April 2018, the Efficiency Unit was renamed as the Efficiency Office (EffO). Secretary for Innovation and Technology Nicholas Yang took that opportunity to acknowledge the work of the EffO, calling the Office as the “unsung heroes” inside the government. He especially named the EffO's contribution in the establishment of The Electronic Health Record Sharing System, and operated the 1823 hotline as well as the Youth.gov.hk.
