= Innovation, Technology and Industry Bureau =

Bureau of the Hong Kong Government

- 創新科技及工業局

Agency overview
- Formed: 20 November 2015 (Innovation and Technology Bureau)
- Jurisdiction: Government of Hong Kong
- Headquarters: 20/F, West Wing, Central Government Offices, 2 Tim Mei Avenue, Tamar, Hong Kong
- Agency executives: Dong Sun, Secretary; Lillian Cheong, Under Secretary; Eddie Mak, Permanent Secretary; Marcus Liu, Political Assistant
- Parent department: Financial Secretary
- Website: Official Website

Innovation, Technology and Industry Bureau
- Traditional Chinese: 創新及科技局
Transcriptions
Yue: Cantonese
- Yale Romanization: Chong sān kahp fō geih guhk
- Jyutping: Cong^{3} san^{1} kap^{6} fo^{1} gei^{6} guk^{6}

Innovation, Technology and Industry Bureau (ITIB) is a policy bureau of the Government of Hong Kong. It is responsible for policy matters on the development of innovation and technology and information technology which are the key drivers in this endeavour. The Bureau is led by the Secretary for Innovation, Technology and Industry, currently Dong Sun.

The Bureau includes an Innovation, Technology and Industry Branch and oversees the operation of the Innovation and Technology Commission, the Office of the Government Chief Information Officer and the Efficiency Office.

== History and development ==
In the "Chief Executive’s 1998 Policy Address", Tung Chee-wah set up a HK$5 billion Innovation and Technology Fund to provide financial support for projects which will contribute to the improved use of innovation and technology in our industrial and commercial sectors. In 2000, the government established the Innovation and Technology Commission and the Applied Science and Technology Research Institute was also established to strengthen government support for innovation and technological development.

== Related policies ==
=== Innovation and Technology Fund for Better Living ===
In order to promote application of innovation and technology in society and improve people’s daily living, the Government proposed to set up a $500 million Innovation and Technology Fund for Better Living. The ITB will consider setting different themes, such as health, transportation, education, safety and environmental protection, so as to facilitate the participation of different sectors.

The eligible applicants include non-government organisations, non-profit making organisations, professional bodies, chambers of commerce and public organisations. The projects must focus on improving people’s daily living and should not be used for profit making or any purpose other than proposals.

The organisations have to sign an agreement with the government and the phased grant will be given according to the progress and achievements of the project as stated in the agreement. A Secretariat is set up to support the daily operation of the fund. An Assessment Committee is established to assess and approve the application from the business community, academia, relevant bureaux or departments, etc.

There is a monitoring and supervision system which monitors the approved projects according to the project phases stated in the agreement. The subvented organisations must maintain a separate and proper set of accounts and records for the projects and submit the progress and financial reports on a regular basis for the Secretariat's review.

=== Hong Kong-Shenzhen Innovation and Technology Park ===
The Hong Kong-Shenzhen Innovation and Technology Park is owned by the Hong Kong Science and Technology Park ("HKSTP") in which initiation, operation and management is run by the HKSTP while inter-governmental arrangements were made by the "Joint Task Force on the Development of the Hong Kong-Shenzhen Innovation and Technology Park" ("Joint Task Force").

The Joint Task Force instigated an agreement between Hong Kong and Shenzhen to carry out an extensive study regarding the Lok Ma Chau Loop development ("Loop") in March 2008. The HK-SZ IT Park is located at the Loop, occupying 87 hectares which were originally administered by Shenzhen. The study commenced in June 2009 and was completed in 2014. Two stages of public engagement and consultation were conducted between 2010 and 2012.

An agreements was signed between the two regions agreeing that the Loop would operate under the principles of "applying the laws and land administration system of the HKSAR"; "non-profit making"; and "friendly negotiation".

==== Objectives ====
- Benefit from national policy in IT development
- The HK-SZ IT Park to serve as a "key base for co-operation in scientific research"
- Encourage scientific collaboration among Mainland and international institutes
- Promote "re-industrialisation"
- Support and assists start-ups, small and medium enterprises
- Create a "vibrant I&T ecosystem for various stakeholders in the government, industry, academic and research sectors"

==== Mode of operation ====
- Bi-annual meetings dedicated to the discussion of the development of the HK-SZ IT Park, additional meeting would be held if it is deemed necessary.
- Relevant reports regarding the HK-SZ IT Park progress would be submitted to facilitate annual review

=== Technology Voucher Programme ===
The Technology Voucher Programme ("TVP") was announced in the 2016- 2017 Budget and was launched under the Innovation and Technology Fund to help the business development of small and medium enterprise ("SME"). The TVP backs "technological services and solutions"-related initiatives and projects to enhance the applicant’s business productivity.

The initial TVP would be implemented for 3 years with $500 million, providing up to a $200,000 fund for each applicant on a 2:1 matching basis. Funded projects are expected to be accomplished in a year while the fund would not cover the business operating costs.

=== IT Venture Fund ===
The Bureau submitted proposal of Innovation and Technology Venture Fund to the Finance Committee at Legislative Council in 2016. According to the Document (FCR(2016–17)67), the Fund is to encourage more private organisation, venture capital funds and angel investors to invest in I&T.

The Council finally approved HK$2 Billion to the Fund. The Innovation and Technology Venture Fund Corporation (ITVFC) was then set up. The Corporation will select venture capital funds and co-invest as Co-investment Partners in IT start-ups. The CP has the obligation to identify potential investee companies which qualify as Eligible Local IT Start-ups to the ITVFC for co-investment.

Further details as follows:

Objective	Encourage more Venture Capital to invest in Hong Kong startups; Increase deal flow
Eligibility	Having an investment focus in IT start-ups; Having an investment coverage including Hong Kong; Having a minimum remaining committed capital of HK$120 million as at the date of application; Having a remaining fund life of at least five years to co-invest with the Corporation.
Selection Criteria	Background and experience of the investment team (15%); Investment track record in IT (25%); Strategic value and support that can be provided to the investee companies (30%); Local resources, business network and contribution to the Hong Kong ecosystem (30%)
Operation of the Fund	ITVFC will act as passive investor, the VC Partner will make the decisions and do all due diligence; A master agreement will set out the rights and obligation of both parties for co-investment; Duration of Partnership ranging from 5 years to 12 years. if no investment is made within the first 5 years, the Agreement will lapse automatically; Not more than 40% of target investment or HK$40 million while aggregate amount will not exceed HK$50 million and aggregate co-investment amount will not exceed HK$400 million; ITVFC and the VC partners will invest and exit on the same term

＊The application of first batch of the Fund started in 2017 and the deadline will be 15/1/2018. Therefore, the effectiveness of the Fund is yet to be evaluated.

== Controversies ==
=== Dispute of Establishment of Bureau in Legislative Council ===
The Bureau had been advocated by former Chief Executive CY Leung in his campaign in 2012. His predecessor Donald Tsang submitted the bill to reform existing bureaus to establish Innovation and Technology Bureau. However, pan-democratic councilor found it offensive as the Chief Executive-elected intervene current administration and legislation. Therefore, they opposed against the bill. It has become political dispute in establishment of the Bureau. And the Bill was not passed.

After CY Leung’s inauguration, the bill of establishing the Bureau had been submitted twice to the Legislative Council. The Bill was originally passed in the Council. However, the pan-democratic councilors filibustered in the Finance Committee against the budget of establishing the Bureau because they were unhappy with the administration about rearranging the agenda of the meeting to prioritise the budget of the Bureau. The Bill was ineffective as the Finance Council could not pass the Budget on the designated time.

The Government submitted the Bill in 2015 again. Pan-democratic councilors filibustered in the Bill and the Budget in the beginning of the debate. However, it passed with the support of the majority of pro-establishment councilors. The Bureau was finally established after three submission of Bill.

=== Conflicting Role Against Steering Committee on Innovation and Technology ===
In October 2017, Chief Executive Carrie Lam promised to "personally lead a high-level, inter-departmental Steering Committee on Innovation and Technology to examine and steer measures under the eight areas of innovation and technology development as well as Smart City projects" (HKSAR, 2017, p. 28) in her first Policy Address. The objective of the Steering Committee is to foster Hong Kong’s innovation and technology development expeditiously and efficiently.

According to the Enterprise Innovation (2017), the Steering Committee will bring more inter-departmental collaboration to speed up the development process of innovation and technology in Hong Kong. The Committee also creates a top-down approach to formulate policy instead of bottom-up approach which is believed that lacking support from the senior level executives hindering inter-departmental collaboration.

Compared to the hierarchy of Innovation and Technology Bureau, some people were worried that the Steering Committee seems to have a higher level of status to override the function of the Bureau.

=== Glory to Hong Kong ===
In November 2022, the ITIB confirmed that the government had asked a search engine, reported to be Google, to list first the correct national anthem instead of Glory to Hong Kong in search results.
