= Legal Aid Department =

Department of the Hong Kong Government

- 法律援助署

Agency overview
- Formed: 1970
- Jurisdiction: Government of Hong Kong
- Headquarters: Queensway Government Offices, 66 Queensway, Hong Kong
- Agency executives: Chris Chong, Director of Legal Aid; Juliana Chan, Deputy Director of Legal Aid (Application and Processing); Steve Wong, Deputy Director of Legal Aid (Policy and Administration); Mo Yuk Wah, Deputy Director of Legal Aid (Litigation)
- Parent department: Chief Secretary for Administration's Office
- Website: Official Website

Legal Aid Department
- Chinese: 法律援助署
Transcriptions
Standard Mandarin
- Hanyu Pinyin: Fǎlǜ Yuánzhù Shǔ
Yue: Cantonese
- Jyutping: faat3 leot6 jyun4 zo6 cyu5

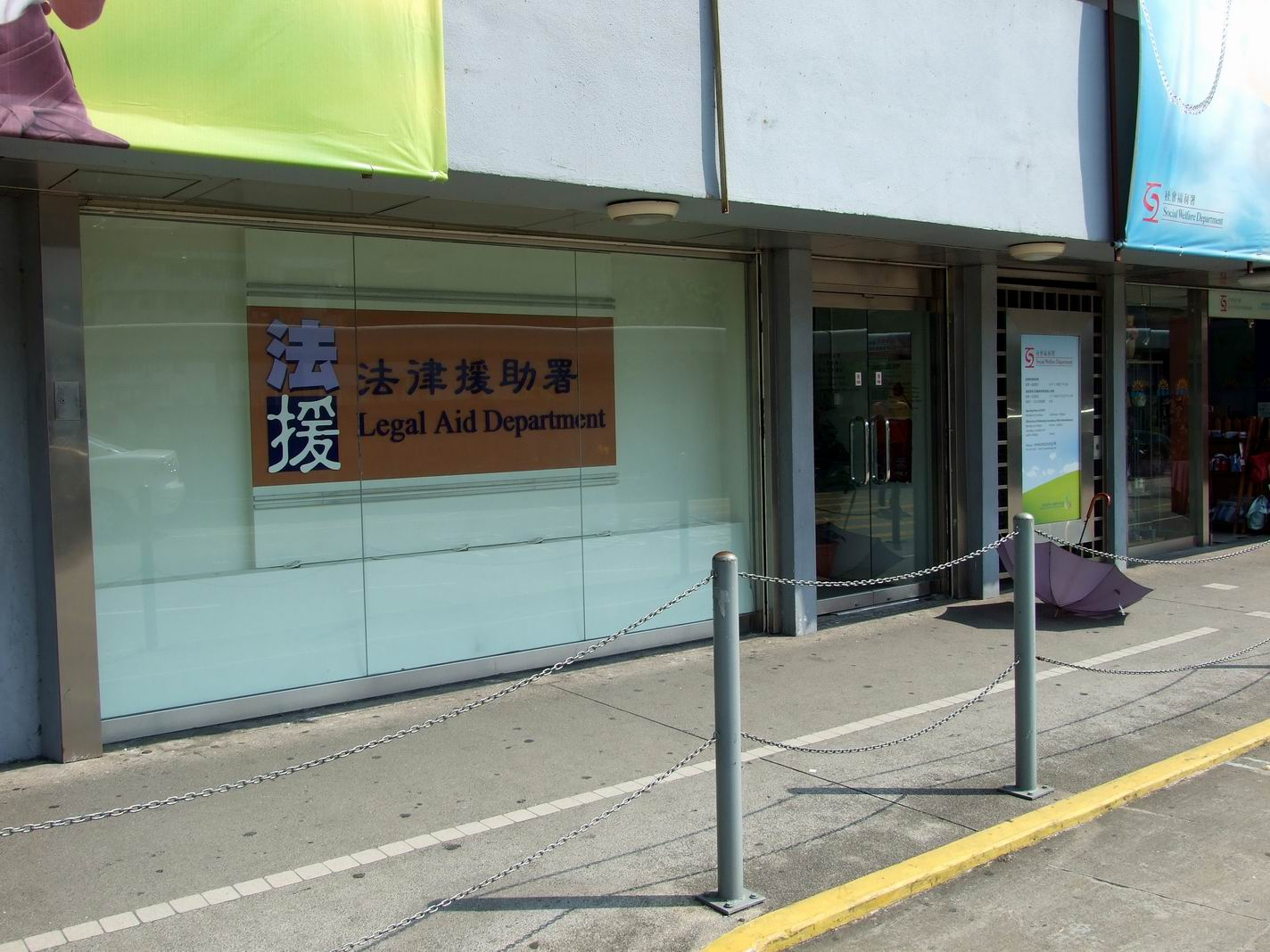
Legal Aid Department

The Legal Aid Department (often abbreviated as LAD) is a department of the Government of Hong Kong. It provides legal aid in the form of legal representation by a solicitor or barrister in civil and criminal proceedings in the District Court and above.

The department is headed by the Director of Legal Aid and is overseen by the Legal Aid Services Council.

== Alleged abuse of the legal aid system ==
In the wake of a number of successful judicial review applications that were made with support from the Legal Aid Department, some pro-government voices criticised the legal aid system for being open to "abuse" and "monopolisation".

In 2021, the government announced a series of measures to curb applicants' ability to choose their own lawyer, and to limit the number of legal aid cases an individual lawyer could take up.

== List of Directors of Legal Aid ==
- Desmond Francis O'Reilly Mayne QC (1968–1981)
- Brian Patrick Clancy (1981–1983)
- Patrick Ronald Moss (1984–1993)
- Pauline Cheung Cheng Po-Lin, Lady Cheung (1993 - June 1996)
- Chan Shu-Ying (June 1996 - 7 August 2004)
- Benjamin Cheung King-man (8 August 2004 - 3 January 2010)
- William Chan Heung-ping (4 January 2010 - September 2013)
- Thomas Edward Kwong (2 September 2013 - 14 March 2022)
- Chris Chong (15 March 2022 – present)
