= Government of Hong Kong =

Executive authorities of Hong Kong

Government of the Hong Kong Special Administrative Region
- 香港政府
- Emblem of Hong Kong

Overview
- Established: 1 July 1997; 29 years ago
- Polity: Hong Kong
- Leader: Chief Executive (John Lee)
- Appointed by: State Council of China upon selection by the Election Committee (Chief Executive) and on the nomination of the Chief Executive (principal officials)
- Main organ: Executive Council
- Ministries: 15 bureaux (full list)
- Responsible to: Central Leading Group on Hong Kong and Macau Affairs
- Annual budget: US$108.2 billion (26 March/27 February)
- Headquarters: Central Government Complex
- Website: gov.hk

Government of the Hong Kong Special Administrative Region
- Traditional Chinese: 香港特別行政區政府
- Simplified Chinese: 香港特别行政区政府
- Jyutping: Hoeng1 gong2 Dak6 bit6 Hang4 zing3 keoi1 Zing3 fu2
- Cantonese Yale: Hēunggóng Dahkbiht Hàhngjingkēui Jingfú
Transcriptions
Standard Mandarin
- Hanyu Pinyin: Xiānggǎng Tèbié Xíngzhèngqū Zhèngfǔ
- Bopomofo: ㄒㄧㄤ ㄍㄤˇ ㄊㄜˋ ㄅㄧㄝˊ ㄒㄧㄥˊ ㄓㄥˋ ㄑㄩ ㄓㄥˋ ㄈㄨˇ
- Wade–Giles: Hsiang^{1}-kang^{3} T'e^{4}-pieh^{2} Hsing^{2}-cheng^{4}-ch'ü^{1} Cheng^{4}-fu^{3}
- IPA: [ɕjáŋ.kàŋ tʰɤ̂.pjě ɕǐŋ.ʈʂə̂ŋ.tɕʰý ʈʂə̂ŋ.fù]
Yue: Cantonese
- Yale Romanization: Hēunggóng Dahkbiht Hàhngjingkēui Jingfú
- Jyutping: Hoeng1 gong2 Dak6 bit6 Hang4 zing3 keoi1 Zing3 fu2
- IPA: [hœŋ˥.kɔŋ˧˥ tɐk̚˨ pit̚˨ hɐŋ˩ tsɪŋ˧ kʰɵɥ˥ tsɪŋ˧ fu˧˥]

Abbreviation
- Chinese: 香港政府
- Jyutping: Hoeng1 gong2 Zing3 fu2
- Cantonese Yale: Hēunggóng Jingfú
Transcriptions
Standard Mandarin
- Hanyu Pinyin: Xiānggǎng Zhèngfǔ
- Bopomofo: ㄒㄧㄤ ㄍㄤˇ ㄓㄥˋ ㄈㄨˇ
- Wade–Giles: Hsiang^{1}-kang^{3} Cheng^{4}-fu^{3}
- IPA: [ɕjáŋ.kàŋ ʈʂə̂ŋ.fù]
Yue: Cantonese
- Yale Romanization: Hēunggóng Jingfú
- Jyutping: Hoeng1 gong2 Zing3 fu2
- IPA: Cantonese pronunciation: [hœ́ːŋ.kɔ̌ːŋ tsēːŋ.fǔː]

The Government of the Hong Kong Special Administrative Region (commonly known as the Hong Kong Government or HKSAR Government) is the executive branch of the Hong Kong Special Administrative Region. It was established on 1 July 1997, following the handover of Hong Kong. It is led by the Chief Executive, who together with the principal officials form the Executive Council, which is the government's de facto cabinet.

The Chief Executive, who is responsible to both Hong Kong and the Central People's Government in Beijing, is appointed by the State Council of China after being elected by the 1500-member Election Committee. The Chief Executive in turn nominates the principal officials for appointment by the State Council of China. The Chief Secretary, who is the most senior principal official, leads the Government Secretariat, which contains most of the government's departments and permanent bureaucracy.

Under the principle of separation of powers, members of the government, including both political appointees and civil servants, cannot run for election to the Legislative Council, to which the government is accountable. The government must rely on the legislature to enact primary legislation and grant supply. The government operates under an executive-led system.

Under the "one country, two systems" constitutional principle, the Government is, in law, exclusively in charge of Hong Kong's internal affairs and specified external relations. The Central People's Government, from which the Hong Kong government is financially independent, is responsible for Hong Kong's defence and foreign policy, while decisions made by the Standing Committee of the National People's Congress can, in certain circumstances, override Hong Kong courts. The Hong Kong SAR government replaced the former British Hong Kong Government (1842–1997) in 1997. Despite gradually evolving, the general governmental structure was inherited from British Hong Kong.

== Powers ==
=== Historical position (1841-1997) ===
As a crown colony and later a dependent territory of the United Kingdom, the government's executive authority was vested in the British monarch, which was exercised by the governor of Hong Kong as the representative of the Crown. The governor was appointed by the monarch on the advice of the British government. Unlike self-governing dominions, which share a common monarch but a separate monarchy who can only be advised by the government of the dominion in their exercise of executive power, the Crown in right of Hong Kong could be advised by the British government in London, making the British Hong Kong government constitutionally subservient to Westminster. Article VIII of the Hong Kong Letters Patent conferred on the governor a legislative power, authorising him, "by and with the advice and consent of the Legislative Council", to "make laws for the peace, order and good government of the Colony".

In practice, executive power was exercised by the governor in consultation with the Executive Council, with the imperial government in London rarely directly intervening in the colony's affairs. The governor served as president of the council and effectively appointed all of its members, with the council advising the governor on all policymaking matters. This in effect meant that all policy and administrative matters had to be considered by the Executive Council before being debated by the legislature. The governor-in-council also had the power to make secondary legislation, and to consider appeals, petitions and objections.

=== After the Handover (1997-present) ===
Upon the handover of Hong Kong on 1 July 1997, sovereignty over the territory was transferred from the United Kingdom to the People's Republic of China. The Hong Kong government largely exercised the same powers and functions, but the source of that power shifted from the Crown to the National People's Congress. Article 2 of the Basic Law states that the National People's Congress authorises the HKSAR to enjoy executive power, suggesting that Hong Kong does not inherently possess such powers.

The powers and functions to be exercised by the Government of Hong Kong are set out in Article 62 of the Basic Law:

1. To formulate and implement policies;
2. To conduct administrative affairs;
3. To conduct external affairs as authorised by the Central People's Government under [the Basic Law];
4. To draw up and introduce budgets and final accounts;
5. To draft and introduce bills, motions and subordinate legislation; and
6. To designate officials to sit in on the meetings of the Legislative Council and to speak on behalf of the government.

==== Modern constitutional position ====
While Hong Kong is often described as having a clear separation of powers with three distinct branches of government, the Hong Kong and Chinese governments frequently assert that Hong Kong has an "executive-led" form of governance and insist that Hong Kong has no formal separation of powers. The requirement that the Chief Executive's consent be obtained before the introduction of bills relating to government policy in the Legislative Council, the split voting system for private members' bills in the Legislative Council, and restriction on private members' bills relating to public spending or the political structure or operation of the government are sometimes cited as features of the "executive-led" system.

== Head of government ==
The Chief Executive is the head of the Region and head of government of Hong Kong. The Basic Law designates a system of governance led by a Chief Executive and an Executive Council, under the principles of separation of powers, with a two-tiered system of semi-representative government and an independent judiciary. The Chief Executive is elected by an Election Committee, a 1500-member electoral college consisting of individuals and bodies (i.e. special interest groups) elected within 40 functional constituencies defined in the Basic Law. The winner is then appointed to the position by the Premier of the People's Republic of China. The Chief Executive is responsible for implementing the Basic Law, signing bills and budgets, promulgating laws, making decisions on government policies, and issuing Executive Orders. Then Chief Executive, Carrie Lam, began exercise of her unfettered residual powers of law-making by decree on 4 October 2019, under the Emergency Regulations Ordinance, Chapter 241 of the Laws of Hong Kong, bypassing the legislature.

As of 1 July 1997, the Chief Executive of Hong Kong officially replaced the Governor of Hong Kong as the head of the government for Hong Kong following the handover. The Chief Executive is assisted by the Chief Secretary for Administration and the Financial Secretary, and other secretaries who heads policy bureaus. The secretaries for each government affairs are appointed by the State Council of China on the nomination of the Chief Executive. The Secretary for Justice (SJ) is responsible for legal matters of the government and prosecution for criminal cases in the territory. The Independent Commission Against Corruption and Audit Commission report directly to the Chief Executive. The current Chief Executive is John Lee.

== Ministers and political organs ==
=== Executive Council ===
The Executive Council decides on matters of policy, the introduction of bills to the Legislative Council and the drafting of subordinate legislation. The Council consists of 21 principal officials and 16 non-official members. All members are appointed by the Chief Executive from among the senior officials of the executive authorities, members of the Legislative Council, and other influential public personnels. They serve for a period no longer than the expiry of the Chief Executive's term of office.

=== Principal officials ===
In a system popularly called the Principal Officials Accountability System introduced by then Chief Executive Tung Chee Hwa in July 2002, all principal officials, including the Chief Secretary, Financial Secretary, Secretary for Justice, heads of government bureaux and the Director of the Chief Executive's Office would no longer be politically neutral career civil servants, but would all be political appointees chosen by the Chief Executive from within or outside the civil service. The system was portrayed as the key to solve previous administrative problems, notably the co-operation of high-ranking civil servants with the Chief Executive.

Under the new system, there are 3 Secretaries of department and 13 Directors of Bureaux. The system is aimed at raising the accountability of the civil service, so the political appointees are responsible for all their job aspects and will step down if they make any failure. All heads of bureaux became members of the Executive Council, and came directly under the Chief Executive instead of the Chief Secretary or the Financial Secretary.

=== Deputy ministers and political assistants ===
The government released a report on the Further Development of the Political Appointment System on 17 October 2007. Two new layers, deputy directors of Bureaux and Assistants to Directors (AD) would be added to the political appointments. Each Director of Bureau will be assisted by the two new appointees and constitute the political team, who would ostensibly work closely with bureau secretaries and top civil servants in implementing the Chief Executive's policy agenda in an executive-led government. As with the principal officials, these two new posts may be drawn from within or outside the civil service, and appointees may or may not have a political background.

Eight new Under-secretaries were named on 20 May, and nine Political Assistant appointments were announced on 22 May 2008. By the administration's own admission, the announcements were poorly handled, and there was widespread criticism of several key aspects, namely the nationality and experience of appointees, the transparency of the recruitment process and the level of officials' salaries.

== Structure ==
The government takes the form of a three-tier structure, which was first put in place by Governor Murray MacLehose following the recommendations in the McKinsey Report.

The executive as a whole is led by the Chief Executive, who is supported by his three most senior ministers: the Chief Secretary, Financial Secretary and Secretary for Justice. Constitutionally known as the "secretaries of departments", they each oversee multiple policy bureaux and agencies, except for the secretary for justice, who only heads the Department of Justice. The policy bureaux are in turn led by policy secretaries, (Note: Termed "directors of bureaux" in the Basic Law) who are politically appointed ministers. The heads of the bureaux are supported by permanent secretaries, who are the highest-ranking civil servants in the bureaux. The final layer consists of departments, which are overseen by the bureaux, and are led by politically neutral civil servants.

=== Policy bureaux and departments ===
The hierarchical structure of the government secretariat and government departments in Chief Executive John Lee's administration since 1 July 2022 is as follows:

Government secretariat and departments, 2022–present
	Government secretariat	Government departments
Under the Chief Secretary for Administration	Chief Secretary for Administration's Office	Administrative Wing; Government Records Service; Legal Aid Department; Protocol Division
Under the Chief Secretary for Administration	Civil Service Bureau	
Under the Chief Secretary for Administration	Constitutional and Mainland Affairs Bureau	Registration and Electoral Office; Beijing Office; Hong Kong Economic and Trade Offices (Mainland China, and Taiwan)
Under the Chief Secretary for Administration	Culture, Sports and Tourism Bureau	Leisure and Cultural Services Department; Tourism Commission
Under the Chief Secretary for Administration	Education Bureau	Working Family and Student Financial Assistance Agency
Under the Chief Secretary for Administration	Environment and Ecology Bureau: Environment Branch; Food Branch	Agriculture, Fisheries and Conservation Department; Environmental Protection Department; Food and Environmental Hygiene Department; Government Laboratory; Hong Kong Observatory
Under the Chief Secretary for Administration	Health Bureau	Department of Health
Under the Chief Secretary for Administration	Home and Youth Affairs Bureau	Home Affairs Department; Information Services Department
Under the Chief Secretary for Administration	Labour and Welfare Bureau	Labour Department; Social Welfare Department
Under the Chief Secretary for Administration	Security Bureau	Auxiliary Medical Service; Civil Aid Service; Correctional Services Department; Customs and Excise Department; Fire Services Department; Government Flying Service; Hong Kong Police Force; Immigration Department
Under the Financial; Secretary	Financial Secretary's Office	Office of the Government Economist
Under the Financial; Secretary	Commerce and Economic Development Bureau	Intellectual Property Department; Invest Hong Kong (InvestHK); Post Office; Radio Television Hong Kong (RTHK); Trade and Industry Department; Hong Kong Economic and Trade Offices (Overseas) (HKETOs)
Under the Financial; Secretary	Development Bureau: Planning and Lands Branch; Works Branch	Architectural Services Department; Buildings Department; Civil Engineering and Development Department; Drainage Services Department; Electrical and Mechanical Services Department; Land Registry; Lands Department; Planning Department; Water Supplies Department
Under the Financial; Secretary	Financial Services and the Treasury Bureau: Financial Services Branch; The Treasury Branch	Census and Statistics Department; Company Registry; Government Logistics Department; Government Property Agency; Inland Revenue Department; Insurance Authority; Official Receiver's Office; Rating and Valuation Department; The Treasury
Under the Financial; Secretary	Housing Bureau	Housing Department
Under the Financial; Secretary	Innovation, Technology and Industry Bureau	Innovation and Technology Commission; Office of the Government Chief Information Officer; Efficiency Office
Under the Financial; Secretary	Transport and Logistics Bureau	Civil Aviation Department; Highways Department; Marine Department; Transport Department

=== Office of the Chief Executive ===
The Office of the Chief Executive is responsible for ensuring the Chief Executive receives the best advice and support for formulating and co-ordinating policies. It is headed by the Director of the Chief Executive's Office, who would sit in meetings of the Executive Council.

The Policy Innovation and Co-ordination Office, Independent Commission Against Corruption, Audit Commission, Office of the Ombudsman and Public Service Commission report to the Chief Executive directly.

=== Chief Secretary for Administration's Office ===
The Human Resources Planning and Poverty Co-ordination Office, Administration Wing and Legal Aid Department are under the Chief Secretary for Administration's Office.

=== Financial Secretary's Office ===
The Office of the Government Economist and the Hong Kong Monetary Authority are under the Financial Secretary's Office.

=== Department of Justice ===
The Department of Justice is led by the Secretary for Justice (Hong Kong) (Legal Department and Attorney General before the transfer of sovereignty). The Secretary for Justice (SJ) is responsible for all prosecutions in Hong Kong, drafting all government legislation, and advising other policy bureaux and departments of the government on a vast array of legal issues.

The department consists of the Prosecutions Division, the Civil Division, the Constitutional and Policy Affairs Division, the Law Drafting Division, the International Law Division, the National Security Prosecutions Division and the Administration and Development Division.

=== Policy Bureaux ===
The current fifteen policy bureaux is a result of the 2022 government reorganisation, which added, expanded, and re-titled several bureaux. Currently, nine bureaux reports to the Chief Secretary for Administration, and the other six reports to the Financial Secretary. The Chief Secretary for Administration is customarily considered to be the leader of the bureaux.

- Civil Service Bureau
- Constitutional and Mainland Affairs Bureau
- Culture, Sports and Tourism Bureau (newly established)
- Education Bureau
- Environment and Ecology Bureau (re-titled from the Environment Bureau and takes over the Food and Health Bureau except health)
- Health Bureau (takes over health policies from the defunct Food and Health Bureau)
- Home and Youth Affairs Bureau (reorganised from the Home Affairs Bureau)
- Labour and Welfare Bureau
- Security Bureau
- Commerce and Economic Development Bureau
- Development Bureau
- Financial Services and the Treasury Bureau
- Housing Bureau (split from the defunct Transport and Housing Bureau)
- Innovation, Technology and Industry Bureau (re-titled from the Innovation and Technology Bureau)
- Transport and Logistics Bureau (split from the defunct Transport and Housing Bureau)

== See also ==
- Chinese Communist Party
  - Politburo of the Chinese Communist Party
  - Central Leading Group on Hong Kong and Macau Affairs
  - Hong Kong and Macau Affairs Office
  - United Front Work Department
- Government of China
  - Hong Kong Liaison Office
  - Committee for Liaison with Hong Kong, Macao, Taiwan and Overseas Chinese
- Government of Macau
- Hong Kong Civil Service
- Legislative Council
- District Councils
- Hong Kong government officials
- Hong Kong politicians
- Government Hill
- Central Government Complex
- Principal Officials Accountability System
