= Brown & Wood =

American law firm

Brown & Wood was a New York–based law firm established in 1914 that merged with Chicago-based Sidley & Austin in 2001 to form Sidley Austin Brown & Wood, later shortened to Sidley Austin.

== History ==
The firm was known for its expertise in capital markets work, specifically the representation of issuers and underwriters in securities offerings. According to Securities Data Co., Brown & Wood was ranked first in both issuers and underwriters representation in 1998, and first as legal adviser on securitized debt issues in the same year. Brown & Wood also cultivated a roster of clients in the real estate investment trust, defense of brokerage firms and international securities offerings, among other areas.

== Offices ==
The firm had offices in New York, Beijing, Hong Kong, London (1989), Los Angeles (1971), San Francisco (1986) and Washington, D.C. (1980) as well as a representative office in Tokyo. In 1986, the firm absorbed Tufo & Zuccotti, the firm of former New York City Deputy Mayor John Zuccotti and Peter Tufo, ex Davis Polk & Wardwell attorneys (though Tufo himself did not join Brown & Wood).

== Legal issues ==
Brown & Wood made headlines in 1988 when it famously de-equitized and fired a partner who it accused of poor performance. The attorney, a graduate of Dartmouth College and New York University School of Law was given $120,000 severance pay and was later reduced to driving a limousine. He sued the firm but lost. The presiding judge, Judge Harold Baer Jr. wrote in his opinion, "Many believe that the last decade has seen the bar move from a profession to a business. In some firms we find that profits have replaced pro bono; production has undercut professionalism and compensation has overtaken collegiality" see: book of business (law).

Typical of the old-line Wall Street law firms, many of which have disappeared or merged with out-of-town rivals, Brown & Wood was considered a cordial, if stuffy, work environment. According to The Insider's Guide to Law Firms published in 1993, formal suits were required and "some summer associates [at Brown & Wood] have been asked questions about the number they owned and about their underclothes."

== Merger ==
In an effort to bulk up in a period of strong law firm consolidation, Brown & Wood explored a merger with fellow New York firm White & Case in 1998, but these talks were described as "preliminary in nature." Brown & Wood eventually merged with Sidley & Austin in 2001. Shortly thereafter, the legacy Brown & Wood's offices in the World Trade Center were destroyed in the 9/11 terrorist attacks. The firm relocated its New York operations to midtown Manhattan.

== Notable attorneys ==
- Charles Li – Chinese banker, former CEO of Hong Kong Stock Exchange
