= Maryknoll Convent School =

School in Hong Kong

Coordinates: 22.3279°N 114.1796°E

- Chinese: 瑪利諾修院學校
- School Crest
- (Primary Section) 130 Waterloo Road, Kowloon Tong, Kowloon (Secondary Section) 5 Ho Tung Road, Kowloon Tong, Kowloon; Hong Kong

Information
- Type: Grant School
- Motto: Sola Nobilitas Virtus (Latin) (Virtue Alone Ennobles)
- Religious affiliation: Roman Catholic (Maryknoll Sisters)
- Established: 11 February 1925; 101 years ago
- School district: Kowloon Tong
- Principal: Ada Chan (Primary Section); Meimei Chan (Secondary Section)
- Supervisor: Ophelia Ngan
- Staff: 71 (2022-2023) (Secondary Section)
- Years: P1–S6
- Gender: Girls
- Enrollment: 809 (2022-2023) (Secondary Section)
- Campus type: Urban
- Website: mcs.edu.hk/

Maryknoll Convent School
- Traditional Chinese: 瑪利諾修院學校
- Simplified Chinese: 玛利诺修院学校
Transcriptions
Standard Mandarin
- Hanyu Pinyin: Mǎlìnuò Xiūyuàn Xuéxiào
Yue: Cantonese
- Jyutping: maa5 lei6 nok6 sau1 jyun2 hok6 haau6

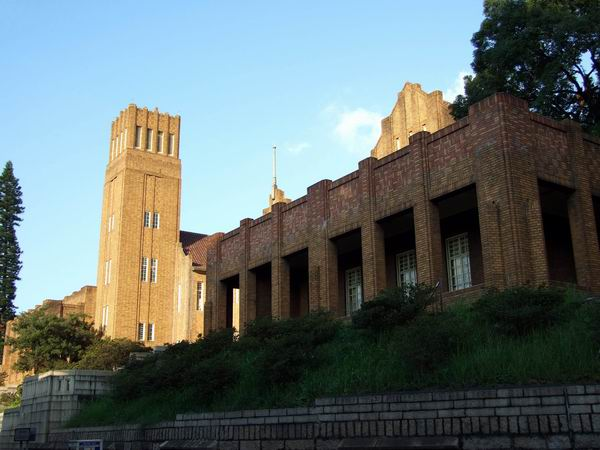
Maryknoll Convent School, viewed from Waterloo Road.

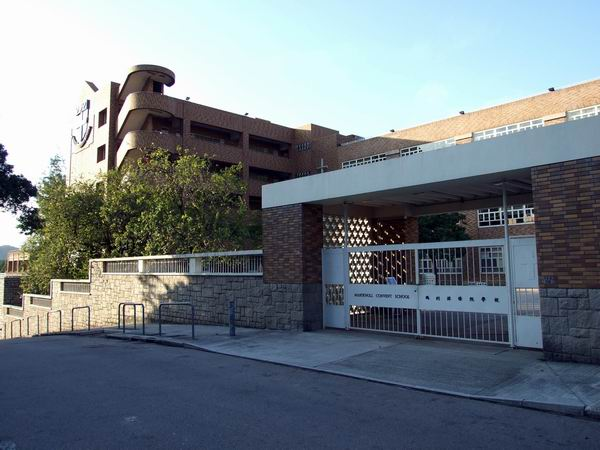
Maryknoll Convent School. No. 5 Ho Tung Road entrance.

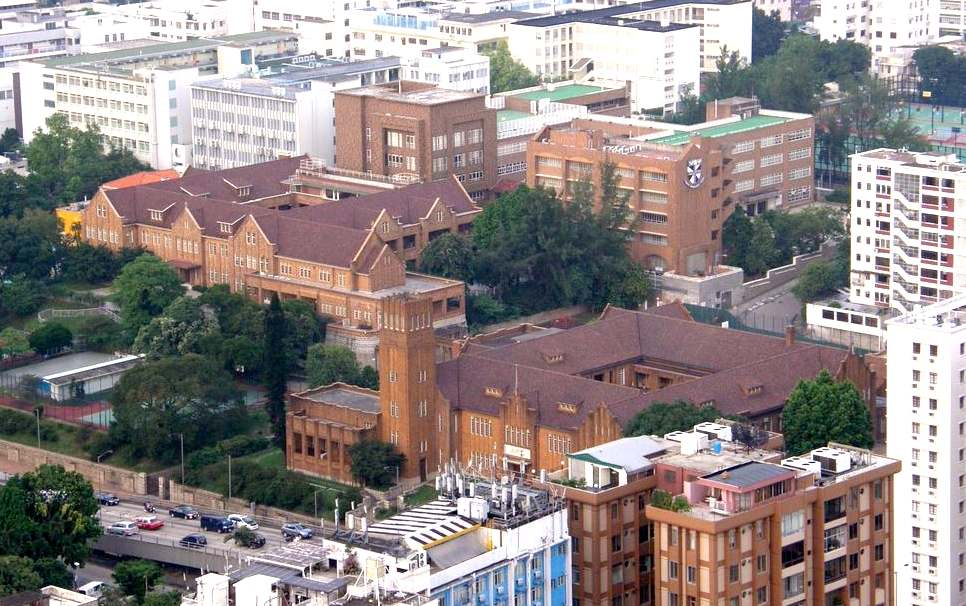
Aerial view of Maryknoll Convent School.

Maryknoll Convent School (MCS, Chinese: 瑪利諾修院學校) (Demonym: Maryknoller) is a Roman Catholic girls' school with primary and secondary sections in Hong Kong. It was established in 1925 by sisters of the Maryknoll Sisters, a Catholic institute founded by Mother Mary Joseph.

Its long history, traditions and distinguished academic results made Maryknoll Convent School a prestigious school in Hong Kong. The school uses English as the medium of instruction in all subjects with the exception of the subjects of Chinese Language, Chinese History and Mandarin.

In 2024, Maryknoll Convent School ranked 13th amongst the 445 schools in Hong Kong that offer the local Hong Kong Diploma of Secondary Education curriculum. BigExam based its rankings on several criteria, including but not limited to the school's HKDSE performance and the percentage of students pursuing further education after graduating. The school also counted a total of 15 winners of the Hong Kong Outstanding Students Awards throughout its history.

Maryknoll Convent School is located in Kowloon Tong, Kowloon, Hong Kong.

== History ==
In 1921, an organisation called Maryknoll Sisters went from the United States to Hong Kong after its founder Mary Joseph Rogers said, 'Let's see what God has in store for us.' On 11 February 1925, Mary Paul began teaching 12 students various subjects in the Convent Parlour at 103 Austin Road. In 1931, due to the growing number of students and teachers, the school moved to 248 Prince Edward Road. The school moved again in 1936 to the current campus at 130 Waterloo Road.

In 1941, the Maryknoll Sisters left Hong Kong and closed the school because the Japanese army invaded Hong Kong. In 1945, after the Japanese surrendered, the school reopened.

In 1960, a new section was inaugurated at 5 Ho Tung Road for the secondary section. The primary section remains at 130 Waterloo Road. The Maryknoll Student Association was set up for the Secondary Section in 1967 under the guidance of Sr Jeanne Houlihan. In 1971, an experimental administrative system, a Staff Council, was set up in the Secondary Section; it was later replaced by a School Advisory Committee and General Staff Assembly in 2001. The student prefect system was instituted in 1989. The MCS Educational Trust was founded in May 1992 to advance education at Maryknoll.

Since 1997, the primary section has been converted to a whole-day school. The school's parent-teacher associations were set up in 2001–02. As of 2005, the Maryknoll Convent School Foundation has replaced the Maryknoll Sisters as the sponsoring body of the school.

== Architecture and landscape ==
On 16 May 2008, Maryknoll Convent School became a Declared monument of Hong Kong. The school is one of the best examples of Gothic architecture in Hong Kong. The school campus is also dubbed as 'Hong Kong's Hogwarts'.

A Norfolk Island Pine tree used to stand at a corner of the school lawn, facing the Waterloo Road Gate of the primary section. It was 71 years old and 23 metres tall. When the school management made the decision to cut the tree down, students and alumni protested, leading to the Development Bureau intervening and allocating funds for the preservation of the tree.

On 4 February 2010, the school announced that due to drainage works, the roots of the tree were severely damaged beyond repair, and it was decided that the tree would be felled. It was later reported that the school could be prosecuted for breaching requirements of the Antiquities and Monuments Ordinance in carrying out the drainage work that led to the damage to the tree. Secretary for Development Carrie Lam told Legislative Council members that the school had not fulfilled the conditions of the permit issued for its drainage work. In addition, Carrie Lam said the school had also felled 18 trees in December 2008 without submitting a removal plan to the Antiquities and Monuments Office.

In 2025, the convent in the primary section was proposed for adaptive reuse as a service, heritage and education centre.

== School principals ==
Primary Section

1935–1958 Ann Mary Farrell
1959–1960 Mary de Ricci
1961–1967 Miriam Xavier
1967–1977 Marie Corinne Rost (A.M. Session)
1977–1995 Elsie Wong (A.M. Session)
1969–1997 Hilda Kan (P.M. Session)
1995–2003 Teresa Chow (1995–1997, A.M. Session)
2003–2017 Josephine Lo
2017–2024 Doris Yuen
2024–present Ada Chan

Secondary Section

1935–1958 Ann Mary Farrell
1959–1965 Mary de Ricci
1965–1972 Rose Duchesne
1972–1986 Jeanne Houlihan
1987–1996 Lydia Huang
1997–2002 Gloria Ko
2002–2006 Winifred Lin
2006–2023 Melaine Lee
2023–present Meimei Chan

== Haberdashery heritage ==
In 2022, an exhibition of haberdashery and related archival materials founded in the primary section's convent attic was held at the Hong Kong Heritage Discovery Centre. Some of these objects were later featured in an exhibition at the Centre for Heritage, Arts and Textile.

== Alumnae ==
- Jennifer Chan
- Bonnie Chan, CEO of Hong Kong Exchanges and Clearing
- Rachel Cheung
- Teresa Cheung
- Valerie Chow
- Rosamund Kwan
- Miriam Lau
- Shelley Lee
- Julia Leung, CEO of Securities and Futures Commission
- Gigi Leung
- Xia Meng
- Jenny Pat
- Michele Reis
- Nansun Shi (filmmaker)
- Eleanor Wong (musician)

== See also ==
- Maryknoll Sisters
- Education in Hong Kong
