= Charles Li =

Chinese banker

- 李小加
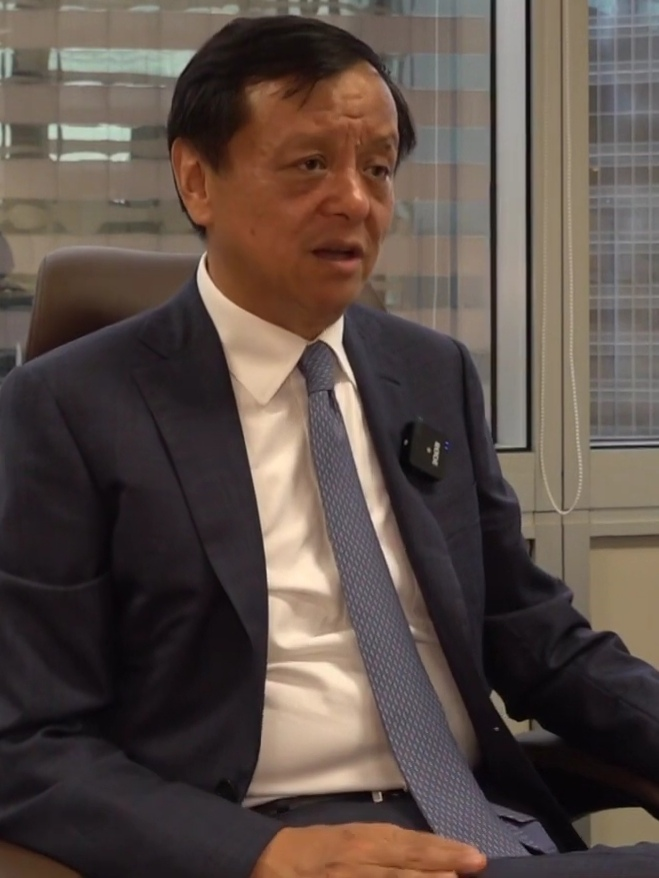
- Li in 2021
- Born: Li Xiaojia; 25 March 1961 (age 65); Beijing, China
- Education: Xiamen University (BA); University of Alabama (MA); Columbia University (JD)
- Title: Former CEO of Hong Kong Exchanges and Clearing

Charles Li Xiaojia, SBS (Chinese: 李小加; born 25 March 1961) is a Chinese banker. He was the Chief Executive of the Hong Kong Exchanges and Clearing Limited (HKEX) from 2010 to 2021. In 2021, he co-founded Micro Connect, a Hong Kong-based company that provides financing to small businesses in mainland China, and serves as its chairman.

== Biography ==
Li was born in 1961 and was an offshore oil worker in the north China sea prior to college. He became a newspaper editor-reporter for the China Daily from 1984 to 1986 and obtained a bachelor's degree in journalism from the Xiamen University in 1984 before he studied at the University of Alabama in which he was graduated with a master's degree in 1988. In 1991, he obtained a Juris Doctor degree from Columbia Law School.

After graduation, Li practiced law in New York with Davis Polk & Wardwell and Brown & Wood. He also began to work in the financial services sector, including in corporate and securities law practices, corporate finance and advisory services in New York, mainland China and New York, and joined Merrill Lynch in 1994 and became president of Merrill Lynch China in 1999. He joined the JP Morgan Chase China and became its chairman in 2003.

In 2015, the Wall Street Journal reported that Charles Li, while he was chairman of JP Morgan China from 2003 to 2009, recommended hiring the children and associates of Chinese officials, clients and potential future clients. At the time, JP Morgan was investigated by the US Securities and Exchange Commission and the US Department of Justice into possible violation of anti-bribery laws by improperly hiring relatives of Chinese officials, known as "princelings", to win business.

In 2010, Li was named Chief Executive of the Hong Kong Exchanges and Clearing Limited (HKEX). During his tenure, a mechanism called Stock Connect was created in 2014 for mainland Chinese investors to trade shares listed in the Hong Kong stock market and international investors to trade shares listed in the stock markets of Shanghai and Shenzhen. In 2020, Li announced his retirement at the end of 2020. He officially stepped down on 1 January 2021.

Li is the co-founder of Micro Connect, a platform to link international capital to small businesses in China that has raised more than $70 million from investors such as Li Ka-shing and Adrian Cheng.

In August 2023, the company announced a US$458 million Series C round at a reported valuation of US$1.7 billion.

In August 2026, it introduced Micro Connect New Markets (NUMA), a framework for contract-based financing aimed at professional investors outside mainland China, who participate through licensed intermediaries.

Li served as a trustee of Columbia University in the City of New York and is current a trustee of Columbia Global Centers, East Asia. He was also appointed a member of the governing council of the University of Hong Kong in 2020, serving a term for three years.

Business positions
Preceded by Paul Chow	Chief Executive of the Hong Kong Exchanges and Clearing; 2010–2021	Succeeded by Nicolas Aguzin
