= Ingrid Wu =

- Born: 1970 (age 55–56); Changzhou, China
- Education: Changzhou School of Public Health
- Occupations: Co-founder, Business executive, Philanthropist
- Employer: AAC Technologies Holdings

Ingrid Chunyuan Wu or Wu Chunyuan (Chinese: 吴春媛; born 1970 in Changzhou) is a Chinese entrepreneur, business executive and billionaire. She is known for co-founding three companies, in particular AAC Technologies. As of June 2024, Forbes has estimated her net worth as $USD1.6 billion.

== Early life and education ==
She moved to U.S. in 1996 and later received her U.S. citizenship. Her educational background is in nursing at the Changzhou School of Public Health, 1989. She also studied at the Changzhou Party School.

== Career ==
She founded a company called Shenzhen Yuanyu in 1993 with her husband Pan Zhengmin. She acted as chief operational officer of Shenzhen Yuanyu till 2005. This company was followed by AAC Technologies Holdings (Chinese: 瑞声科技; in HKEx since 2005), which manufactures e.g. miniature loudspeakers, receivers and MEMS microphones for Apple and Samsung mobile devices.

Wu owns about 26% of the group. In April 2018, based on Bloomberg estimation included 21% of shares owned directly or through a Hong Kong holding company, plus half of the 9% holding of the family. Her shares were worth $5.02 billion.
