= Shanghai Securities Exchange Building =

Tower in Shanghai, China

Coordinates: 31°14′18″N 121°30′23″E

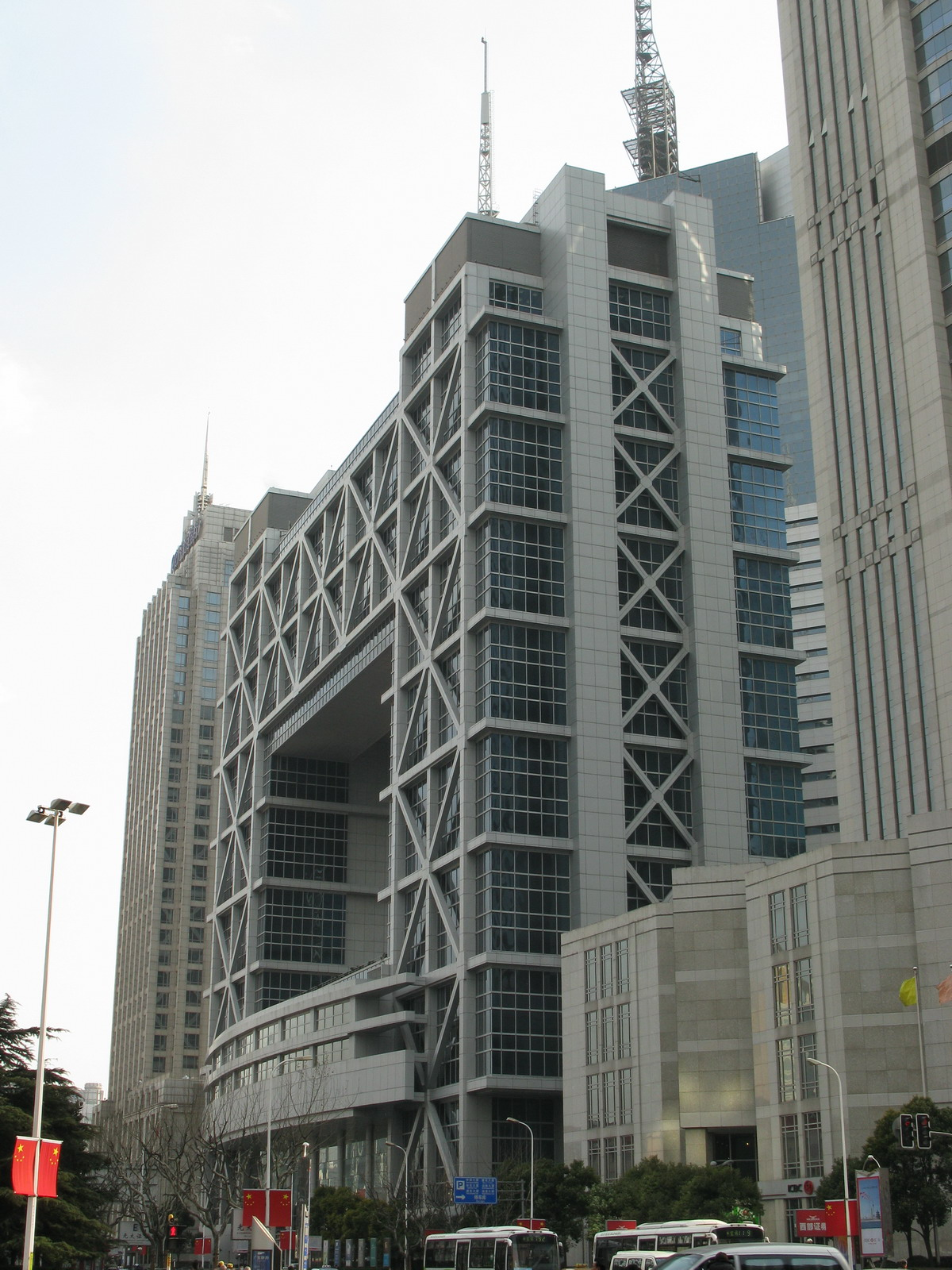
Shanghai Stock Exchange Building

Shanghai Securities Exchange Building is a 26 floor tower in the Pudong area of Shanghai, China and home to the Shanghai Stock Exchange.

It was designed by WZMH Architects of Toronto and was completed in 1997. The tower reaches a height of 109 m (358 ft), while the flagpole atop the building adds another 70 m.

Prior to 1997 the stock market was located at old Astor House Hotel (Shanghai) from 1990 to 1997 and had been home to the original market from 1920 to 1949.
