= Micro Connect =

Hong Kong financial technology startup

Micro Connect International Finance Company Limited 滴灌通國際投資有限公司
- Industry: Financial services
- Founded: 2021
- Founder: Charles Li
- Headquarters: Central, Hong Kong
- Area served: Hong Kong SAR; Macau SAR; Mainland China
- Key people: Charles Li (Chairman)
- Website: www.microconnect.com

Micro Connect is a Hong Kong-based financial technology and market-infrastructure company founded in 2021 by Charles Li and Gary Zhang. It provides financing to micro and small businesses in mainland China and has developed financing and investment arrangements linked to business revenue and contractual cash flows.

In August 2026, Micro Connect introduced Micro Connect New Markets(NUMA), a new market framework for real-world commercial contracts that generate recurring cash flows.

== History ==
Micro Connect was founded in 2021 by Charles Li and Gary Zhang. In its early operations, the company provided revenue-based financing to micro and small businesses in mainland China, with repayment linked to a share of business revenue and collected through an automated daily collection mechanism. In 2022, it completed a US$70 million Series B funding round, bringing its total funding at that time to US$120 million.

In 2023, Micro Connect raised US$458 million in a Series C financing round, at a reported valuation of US$1.7 billion. In August, it launched the Micro Connect (Macao) Financial Assets Exchange (MCEX). The exchange listed Daily Revenue Obligations (DROs), instruments based on agreed shares of the daily revenue of individual businesses, as well as portfolios of such instruments.

In August 2026, Micro Connect introduced Micro Connect New Markets (NUMA), a market-infrastructure framework for contract-based financing (CBF). The framework organizes commercial-contract cash flows through contract law and connects capital through securities law; it is intended for eligible professional investors participating through licensed intermediaries.

== Business Model ==
During phase 1.0, Micro Connect provides revenue-based financing to micro and small businesses in mainland China.Instead of taking equity or making fixed-interest loans, it advances capital in exchange for an agreed share of a business's revenue, collected through an automated daily repayment mechanism. The company links these businesses to offshore institutional investors, who take part in financing and investment arrangements tied to business revenue and contractual cash flows.

In phase 2.0, Micro Connect received authorisation in November 2022, by executive order of the Chief Executive of the Macao SAR, to establish and operate the Micro Connect (Macao) Financial Assets Exchange (MCEX).

In August 2026, Micro Connect stepped into phase 3.0, introduced Micro Connect New Markets (NUMA), a market-infrastructure framework that organises contract cash flows under contract law and connects them with capital under securities law, for eligible offshore institutional and professional investors.
