= Pan Zhengmin =

Chinese entrepreneur

- Born: 1969 (age 56–57)
- Occupation: Co-founder (along with his wife Ingrid) of AAC Technologies of Shenzhen
- Spouse: Ingrid Wu

Pan Zhengmin (Chinese: 潘政民; born 1969) is a Chinese entrepreneur, the co-founder (along with his wife Ingrid Wu) of Shenzhen AAC Technologies (Chinese: 瑞声科技), an electronic components company.

== Early life ==
Pan Zhengmin was born in 1969, and educated at Jiangsu Province Wujin Teacher School.

== Career ==
Along with his wife Ingrid, Pan Zhengmin co-founded AAC Technologies of Shenzhen, an electronic components company.

== Personal life ==
He is married to Ingrid and lives in Shenzhen, China.
