= Nicolas Aguzin =

Former Hong Kong Stock Exchange CEO

Nicolás Aguzin
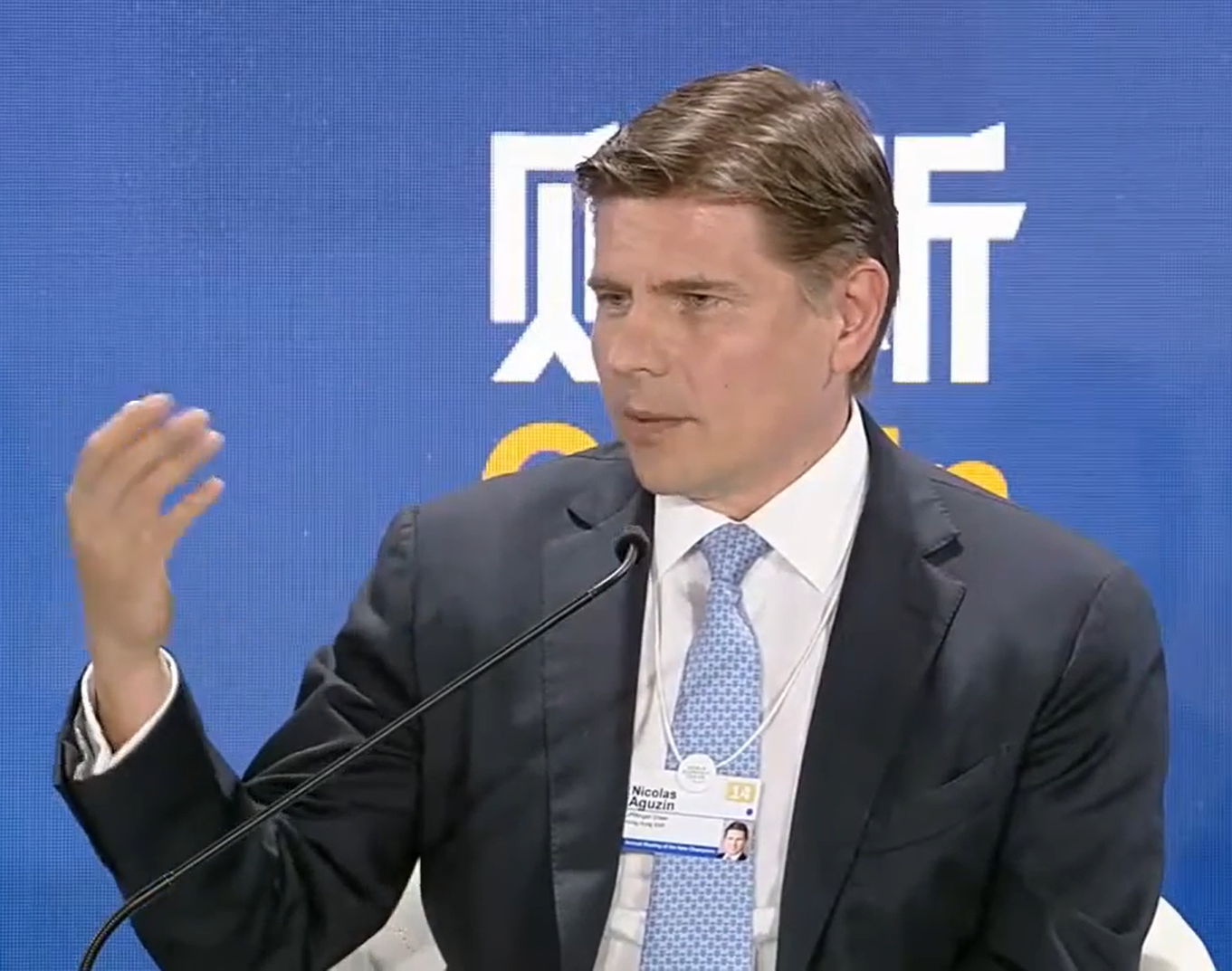
- Nicolas Aguzin at World Economic Forum in 2014
- Born: December 1968 (age 57); Formosa, Argentina
- Education: Wharton School of the University of Pennsylvania
- Title: Former CEO of Hong Kong Exchanges and Clearing
- Spouse: Inés Aguzin

Alejandro Nicolás Aguzin (nicknamed Gucho; Chinese: 歐冠昇; born 1968) is an Argentinian banker. He was the chief executive officer of Hong Kong Exchange and Clearing Limited (HKEX) between May 2021 and February 2024.

Prior to this, he was the chief executive officer of international private bank at J.P Morgan Chase.

== Early life ==
Aguzin was born circa 1968 in Formosa, Argentina. He attended St. George's College, Quilmes since 10 years old. He moved to the United States to attend the Wharton School at the University of Pennsylvania where he received a bachelor degree in Economics.

== Career ==
Aguzin joined J.P Morgan Chase in 1990 in Buenos Aires as a financial analyst. Between 1990 and 2005, he held a variety of roles in New York and Buenos Aires including Head of the Investment Banking Division in Latin America. In 2005 he was appointed as CEO of Latin America.

Aguzin relocated to Hong Kong with J.P. Morgan Chase in 2012, and from 2013 to 2020, he was the CEO of Asia-Pacific. Aguzin was also Head of the Investment Banking Division in Asia-Pacific. From 2019 to 2021, Aguzin was CEO of the International Private Bank at J.P Morgan Chase.

On 9 February 2021 HKEX announced that it had appointed Aguzin as chief executive officer, effective 24 May 2021 for a term of three years, until 23 May 2024. The appointment of a non-Chinese person as CEO of HKEX was reportedly unexpected by market observers, who noted Aguzin will have to balance the demands of authorities in Beijing with those of Hong Kong's trading community.

In December 2023, HKEX announced that Aguzin informed the board that he will not seek reappointment at the end of his contract in May 2024. His term was marked by difficulties which included regulatory crackdowns, COVID-19 pandemic and a decline in profits leading to the HKEX share price plunging 42%. Aguzin left his role two months early at the end of February 2024 and was succeeded by Bonnie Chan.

== Personal life ==
Aguzin is a permanent resident of Hong Kong where he currently resides with his wife, Ines. He also holds a Croatian passport.

He speaks Spanish, Portuguese and English.

Aguzin is known by his nickname, Gucho which is a play on words in Spanish that hints at his reputation as a big character.

Aguzin sits on the board of directors of MercadoLibre, and is also on the boards of trustees of the Asia Society and the Eisenhower Fellowships.

Business positions
| Preceded by Charles Li | Chief Executive of the Hong Kong Exchanges and Clearing; 2021-2024 | Succeeded by Bonnie Chan |
