= Ian Hay Davison =

British accountant, businessman and bell ringer (1931–2022)

- Born: Ian Frederic Hay Davison; 30 June 1931; Hillingdon, Middlesex, England
- Died: 20 September 2022 (aged 91); Bath, Somerset, England
- Education: Dulwich College; London School of Economics; University of Michigan
- Employers: Tansley Witt; Arthur Andersen; Department of Trade and Industry; Lloyd's of London; Accounting Standards Committee; Newspaper Publishing; Storehouse

Ian Frederic Hay Davison CBE (30 June 1931 – 20 September 2022) was a British accountant, businessman and bell ringer. He was the chief executive of Lloyd's of London from 1982 and helped to reform the insurer.

In 1988, he led a report on the management and operations of the Hong Kong Stock Exchange, following its closure during the Black Monday crash of 1987. Defects were found and reforms recommended.

In 1998, the Institute of Chartered Accountants in England and Wales recognised him with the Founding Societies’ Centenary Award for his outstanding contributions.

Davison campaigned to reopen Templecombe railway station and became an enthusiastic bell ringer.

Davison died at his home in Bath, Somerset, on 20 September 2022, aged 91.
