= Hong Kong Precious Metals Central Clearing Company =

Hong Kong based precious metals clearing company

- Industry: Financial services
- Founded: July 2026; 4 months ago
- Headquarters: Hong Kong
- Services: Precious metals clearing and settlement
- Website: https://www.hkpmcc.org.hk/

The Hong Kong Precious Metals Central Clearing Company (HKPMCC) is a gold clearing and settlement organization based in Hong Kong. The company will hold 400 fine troy ounce bars for settlement (while the standard for China is metric). This conforms to international standards.

== History ==
It was launched in July 2026, and is wholly owned by the Government of Hong Kong.

== Board of directors ==
The board of directors is composed of Shanghai Gold Exchange members, regulatory bodies, and the following 11 banks:

- Agricultural Bank of China Limited Hong Kong Branch
- Australia and New Zealand Banking Group Limited
- Bank of China (Hong Kong) Limited
- Bank of Communications (Hong Kong) Limited
- China Construction Bank (Asia) Corporation Limited
- Citi Hong Kong, Industrial and Commercial Bank of China (Asia) Limited
- JP Morgan
- Standard Chartered Bank (Hong Kong) Limited
- Hongkong and Shanghai Banking Corporation (HSBC (Hong Kong))
- UBS AG

== See also ==
- Hong Kong Exchanges and Clearing
