= Hong Kong Stock Exchange =

Stock exchange based in Hong Kong

Stock Exchange of Hong Kong
- 香港聯合交易所

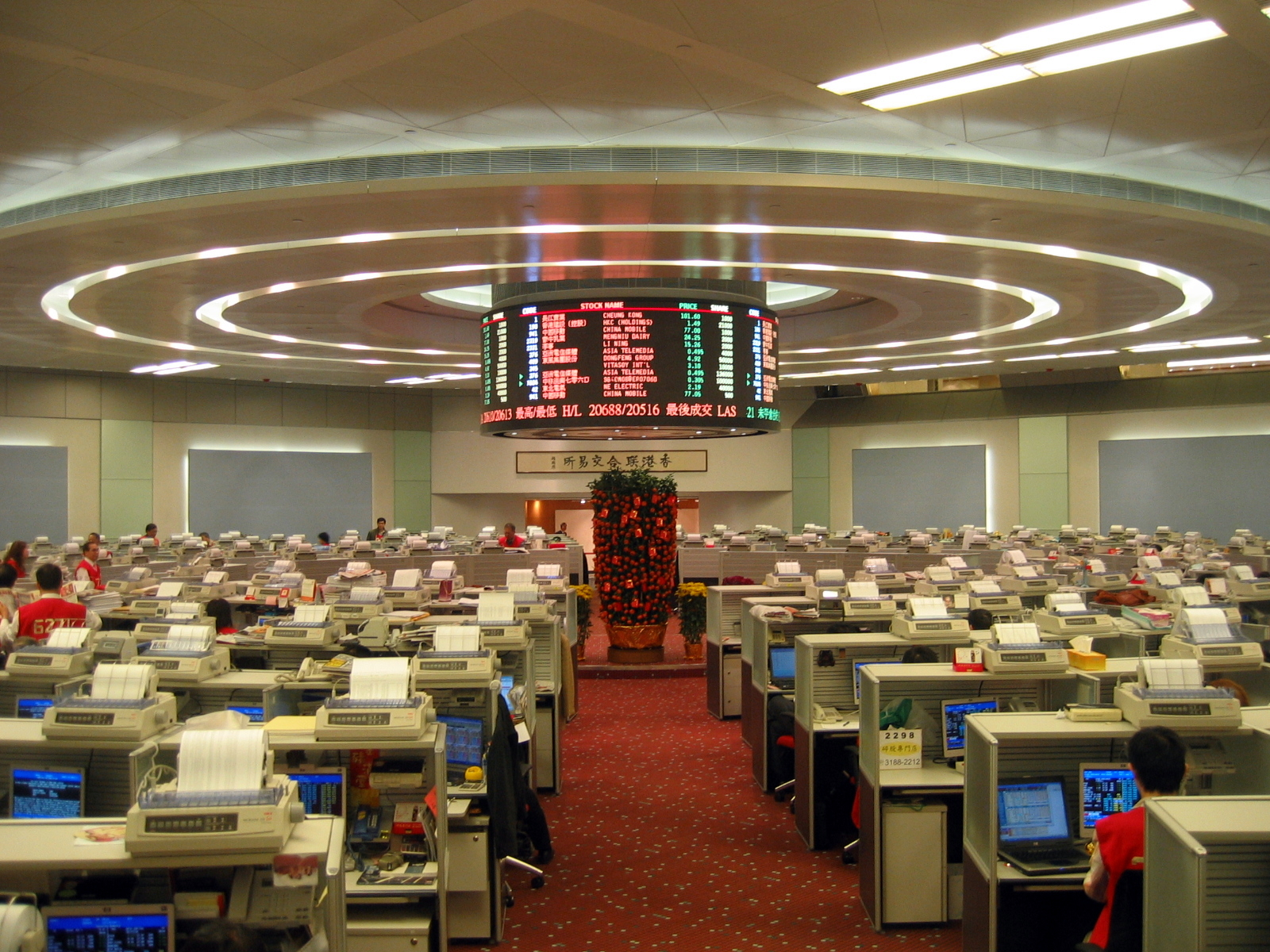
- The now-defunct floor trading lobby in 2007
- Type: Stock exchange
- Location: Central District, Hong Kong
- Coordinates: 22.28414°N 114.15768°E
- Founded: 3 February 1891; 135 years ago (as Association of Stockbrokers in Hong Kong); 21 February 1914; 112 years ago (as Hong Kong Stock Exchange)
- Owner: Hong Kong Exchanges and Clearing
- Key people: Bonnie Chan (CEO); Laura Cha (Chairman)
- Currency: Hong Kong dollar
- No. of listings: 2,673 (February 2026)
- Market cap: HK$48.55 trillion (US$6.25 trillion) (February 2026)
- Website: hkex.com.hk

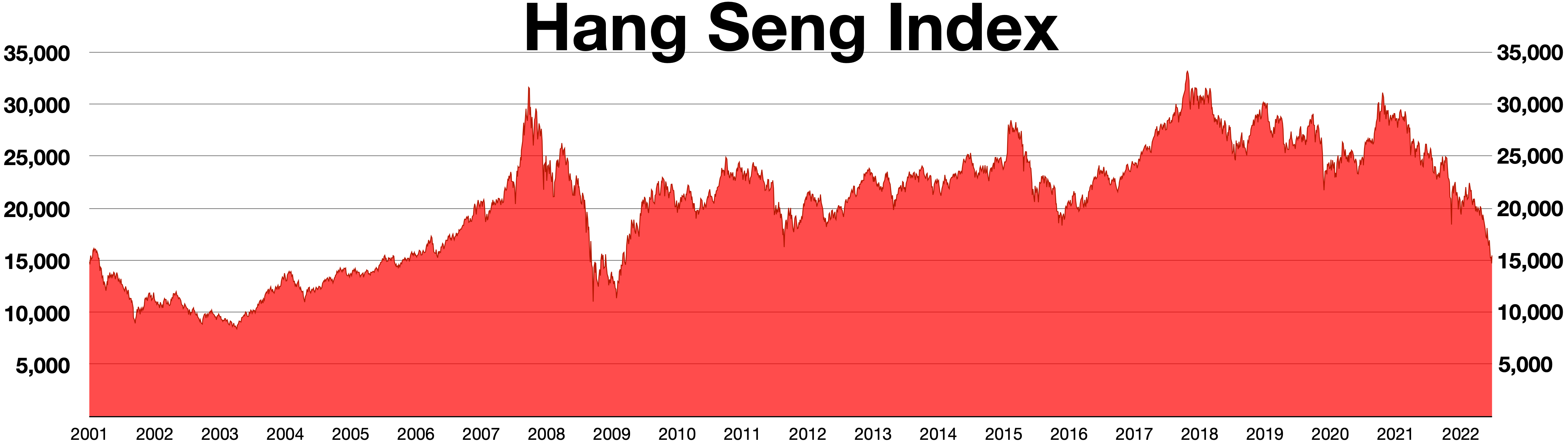
Hang Seng Index (2001–2022)

Stock Exchange of Hong Kong
- Traditional Chinese: 香港聯合交易所
- Simplified Chinese: 香港联合交易所
Transcriptions
Standard Mandarin
- Hanyu Pinyin: Xiānggǎng Liánhé Jiāoyìsuǒ
Yue: Cantonese
- Yale Romanization: Hēunggóng Lyùhnhahp Gāauyihksó
- Jyutping: Hoeng^{1}gong^{2} Lyun^{4}hap^{6} Gaau^{1}jik^{6}so^{2}

SEHK
- Traditional Chinese: 聯交所
- Simplified Chinese: 联交所
Transcriptions
Standard Mandarin
- Hanyu Pinyin: Lián Jiāo Suǒ
Yue: Cantonese
- Yale Romanization: Lyùhn Gāau Só
- Jyutping: Lyun^{4} Gaau^{1} So^{2}

The Stock Exchange of Hong Kong (Chinese: 香港交易所, SEHK, also known as Hong Kong Stock Exchange) is a stock exchange based in Hong Kong. It is one of the largest stock exchanges in Asia and the 6th largest globally by market capitalization as of February 2026. The exchange plays a crucial role in connecting international investors with mainland Chinese companies, serving as a major platform for capital raising. Unlike mainland Chinese exchanges, it operates under Hong Kong's distinct regulatory framework, which allows greater access to foreign investors.

The stock exchange is owned (through its subsidiary Stock Exchange of Hong Kong Limited) by Hong Kong Exchanges and Clearing Limited (HKEX), a holding company that it also lists (SEHK: 388) and that in 2021 became the world's largest bourse operator in terms of market capitalization, surpassing Chicago-based CME. A 2021 poll reported that approximately 57% of Hong Kong adults had money invested in the stock market. The physical trading floor at Exchange Square was closed in October 2017.

== History ==
The Hong Kong securities market can be traced back to 1869, but the stock market was formally set up in 1891, when the Association of Stockbrokers in Hong Kong was established. It was renamed as The Hong Kong Stock Exchange in 1914.

By 1972, Hong Kong had four stock exchanges in operation. There were subsequent calls for the formation of a unified stock exchange. The Stock Exchange of Hong Kong Limited was incorporated in 1980 and trading on the exchange finally commenced on 2 April 1986. Since 1986, a number of major developments have taken place. The 1987 market crash revealed flaws in the market and led to calls for a complete reform of the Hong Kong securities industry. This led to significant regulatory changes and infrastructural developments. As a result, the Securities and Futures Commission (SFC) was set up in 1989 as the single statutory securities market regulator.

The market infrastructure was much improved with the introduction by the exchange of the Central Clearing and Settlement System (CCASS) in June 1992 and the Automatic Order Matching and Execution System (AMS) in November 1993. Since then, the framework of market rules and regulations, both exchange-administered or otherwise, have been undergoing continuing review and revision to meet changing market needs while ensuring effective market regulation.

The Exchange Listing Rules have been made more comprehensive, and other existing regulations have been improved or new regulations introduced to enhance market development and investor protection. Enhancements were also made to the system infrastructure, including the launch of off-floor trading terminals in brokers' offices in January 1996. The third generation of the trading system, AMS/3, was launched in 2000. It provides enhanced functionality and a platform for a straight-through transaction process.

In respect of market and product development, there is the listing of the first derivative warrant in February 1988, the listing of the first China-incorporated enterprise (H share) in June 1993 (Tsingtao Brewery); and the introduction of regulated short selling in January 1994 and stock options in September 1995. Furthermore, the exchange introduced the Growth Enterprise Market (GEM) in November 1999 to provide fundraising opportunities for growth companies of all sizes from all industries, and to promote the development of technology industries in the region.

According to the reform plan announced in March 1999, the Exchange, the Hong Kong Futures Exchange and their clearinghouses merged into a new holding company, the Hong Kong Exchanges and Clearing Limited.

By the 2010s, the Hong Kong Stock Exchange overtook the South Korean Stock Exchange and the Tokyo Stock Exchange.

=== Brief chronology ===
- On 2 April 1986, a new trading hall opened. At that time, a total of 249 companies were listed on the Exchange, total market capitalisation was HK$245 billion.
- On 6 October 1986, the Stock Exchange had its grand opening.
- In October 1987, the Stock Exchange was closed for four days in an attempt to stop losses during Black Monday global equities market crash.
- In May 1988, the Ian Hay Davison Report, commissioned to investigate practices on the exchange in the lead-up to its closure, is released, resulting in significant market reforms - although many took years to finally implement
- On 24 June 1992, the Central Clearing and Settlement System (CCASS) was introduced
- On 15 July 1993, the Tsingtao Brewery became the first Chinese enterprise to list its H shares on the exchange.
- On 1 November 1993, a new "Automatic Order Matching and Execution System", AMS/1, was introduced on the exchange; later, in January 1996, the second phase AMS/2 was introduced, becoming the basis of off-floor trading.
- On 12 November 1999, the Tracker Fund of Hong Kong, created by government intervention during the 1997 Asian financial crisis, had its introduction on the exchange.
- On 25 November 1999, two companies were jointly listed on the newly created Growth Enterprise Market (GEM).
- On 6 March 2000, The Stock Exchange, Futures Exchange, and Hong Kong Securities Clearing Company all became wholly owned subsidiaries of HKEx, which was in turn listed on 27 June 2000.
- On 23 October 2000, AMS/3 was implemented on the exchange.
- On 16 January 2006, the Trading Hall was renovated, opened and renamed the Exchange Trading and Exhibition Hall Complex, with the trading area reduced by over half.
- On 31 January 2013, the HKEx Data Centre in Tseung Kwan O was opened and officiated by the then Hong Kong Chief Executive C. Y. Leung.
- On 27 October 2017, the floor trading lobby was closed due to the shift towards electronic trading. By 2014, the venue accounted for less than 1% of trade volume. The Exchange Trading and Exhibition Hall Complex was reopened as the Hong Kong Connect Hall in 20 February 2018 by the then Hong Kong Chief Executive Carrie Lam and was redeveloped into a conference, ceremonial and exhibition space to showcase Hong Kong's financial markets. Listing ceremonies are also hosted at the Hong Kong Connect Hall.
- 19 July 2023: the Hong Kong Dollar (HKD)-Renminbi (RMB) Dual Counter Model was launched with both counters having the same rights, entitlement, status and par value if applicable. Investors are now able to trade their shares on the RMB counter using their offshore RMB. Shares are fully interchangeable between the 2 counters. The model was introduced to provide liquidity to the RMB counter and minimize discrepancies between the 2 counters.

source: HK Ex

=== Exchange history and predecessors ===
Association of Stockbrokers in Hong Kong (Founded 1891)

(1914) Renamed to Hong Kong Stock Exchange

(1947) A merger is made after World War II with Hong Kong Stock Exchange retaining the name

Hong Kong Stockbrokers Association (Founded 1921)

Hong Kong Stockholders Association (Founded 1956) allow info sharing between HKSE and other exchanges

Far East Exchange Ltd (Founded 1969)

Kam Ngan Stock Exchange Ltd (Founded 1971)

Kowloon Stock Exchange Ltd (Founded 1972)

(1986) HKSE merges with other exchanges and retain the name but also presented as Stock Exchange of Hong Kong

(2000) Hong Kong Exchanges and Clearing becomes the holding company for Hong Kong Stock Exchange

Hong Kong Futures Exchange Ltd (Founded 1976)

Hong Kong Securities Clearing Company Ltd (Founded 1989)

== Trading hours ==
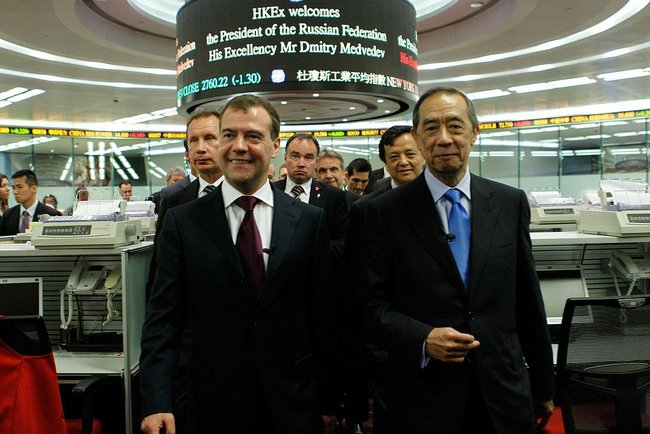
Russian president Dmitry Medvedev with exchange chairman Ronald Arculli during a visit to Hong Kong on 17 April 2011

The trading day consists of:

- A pre-opening auction session from 9:00 am to 9:30 am. The opening price of a security is reported shortly after 9:20 am.
- A morning continuous trading session from 09:30 am to 12:00 pm.
- An extended morning session from 12:00 noon to 1:00 pm, also referred to as the lunch break. Continuous trading proceeds in specifically designated securities (currently two ETFs, 4362 and 4363). Trading in other securities is not possible. However, previously placed orders in any securities can be cancelled from 1:00 pm onwards.
- An afternoon continuous trading session from 1:00 pm to 4:00 pm.

The closing price is reported as the median of five price snapshots taken from 3:59 to 4:00 pm every 15 seconds. In May 2008, the exchange also implemented a closing auction session to run from 4:00 pm to 4:10 pm, with a similar pricing mechanism as the opening auction; however, this resulted in significant fluctuations in the closing prices of stocks and suspicions of market manipulation. Initially, the exchange proposed limiting price fluctuations in the auction sessions to 2%; in the end, they removed the closing session entirely in March 2009.

Up until 2011, trading hours comprised a pre-opening auction from 9:30 am to 9:50 am, followed by continuous trading from 10:00 am to 12:30 pm and 2:30 pm to 4:00 pm. The two-hour lunch break between the morning and afternoon sessions was the longest among the world's 20 major stock exchanges. A 2003 proposal to shorten the lunch break failed due to opposition from brokers. Another plan to shorten the lunch break to one hour was floated by the exchange in 2010; the morning session would then start earlier, run from 9:30 am to 12:00 pm, and the afternoon session from 1:00 pm to 4:00 pm, leaving the closing time the same as before. Justifications included bringing hours into line with China. Reactions from both brokers and the restaurant industry were mixed.

On 7 March 2011, the exchange extended its hours in the first of two phases. The morning session now ran from 9:30 am to 12:00 noon, followed by a ninety-minute lunch break, and an afternoon session from 1:30 pm to 4:00 pm. Index futures and options now began trading at 9:15 am, thirty minutes earlier than before, and closed at the same time as before, 4:15 pm. On 5 March 2012, the lunch break was cut to sixty minutes, with the afternoon session running from 1:00 pm to 4:00 pm.

== Electronic trading ==
The exchange first introduced a computer-assisted trading system on 2 April 1986. In 1993 the exchange launched the "Automatic Order Matching and Execution System" (AMS), which was replaced by the third generation system (AMS/3) in October 2000.

== Regulatory role ==
David Webb, independent non-executive director of the Exchange since 2003, has been arguing for a super regulatory authority to assume that role as regulator, as there is an inherent conflict between its commercial and regulatory roles. In the meantime, he argues for improved investor representation on the Hong Kong Stock Exchange.

In 2007, the uproar by smaller local stockbrokers over the decision by board of directors to cut minimum trading spreads for equities and warrants trading at between 25 HK cents and HK$2 caused the new board to vote to reverse the decision. The reforms were to be implemented in the first quarter, but was put back on the table following protests by brokers. Webb criticised the board for caving in to vested interests.

== Twenty largest stocks by market capitalisation ==
Source: HKEX, in billions of Hong Kong dollars, Data updated on 14 February 2018

1. Tencent Holdings: $4,118.93
2. Industrial and Commercial Bank of China: $2,877.98
3. China Construction Bank: $2,167.39
4. Bank of China: $1,803.12
5. PetroChina: $1,715.53
6. Agricultural Bank of China: $1,641.43
7. HSBC Holdings: $1,629.79
8. Ping An Insurance: $1,547.81
9. China Mobile: $1,509.04
10. China Merchants Bank: $991.75
11. Bank of Communications: $985.55
12. China Life Insurance Company: $844.57
13. Postal Savings Bank of China: $676.41
14. China National Offshore Oil Corporation: $492.91
15. China Minsheng Bank: $420.11
16. BOC Hong Kong (Holdings): $412.34
17. China Pacific Insurance Company: $404.37
18. CK Hutchison Holdings: $377.47
19. CITIC Bank International: $367.82

== See also ==
- A-share (mainland China)
- Shanghai Stock Exchange
- Shenzhen Stock Exchange
- H share
- Hang Seng Index
- Hong Kong IPO market fraud
- Leading stock
- List of East Asian stock exchanges
- Stock disasters in Hong Kong
