= Shanghai Stock Exchange =

Stock exchange in Shanghai, China

- 上海证券交易所

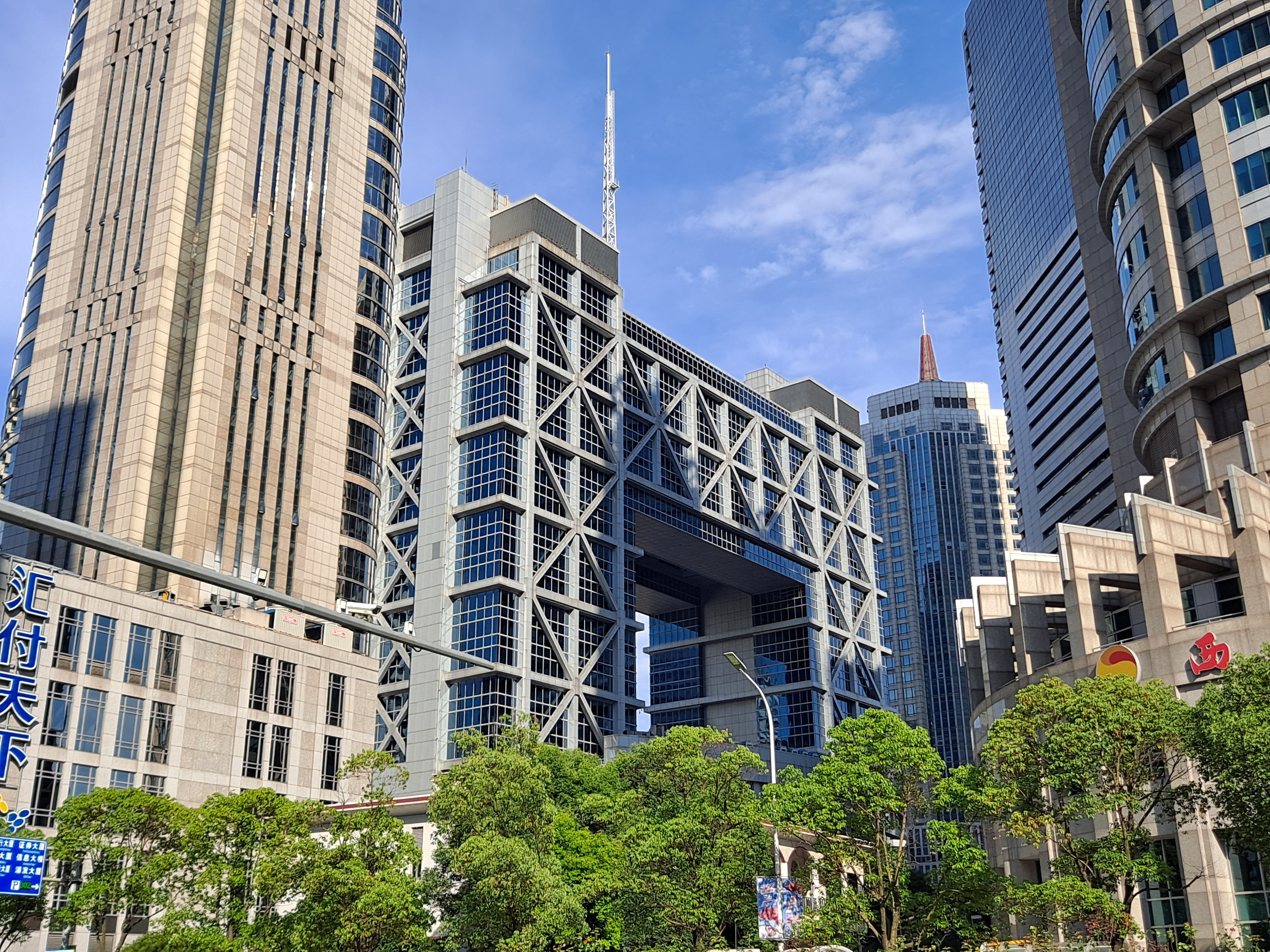
- Type: Stock exchange
- Location: Shanghai, China
- Coordinates: 31°14′12.3″N 121°30′31.5″E
- Founded: 1866; 160 years ago (as Shanghai Sharebrokers Association); November 26, 1990; 35 years ago (as Shanghai Stock Exchange)
- Key people: Geng Liang (Chairman); Zhang Yujun (President)
- Currency: CNY
- No. of listings: 2,316 (may 2026)
- Market cap: ¥69.451 trillion ($10.21 trillion) (May 2026)
- Indices: SSE Composite; SSE 50
- Website: english.sse.com.cn

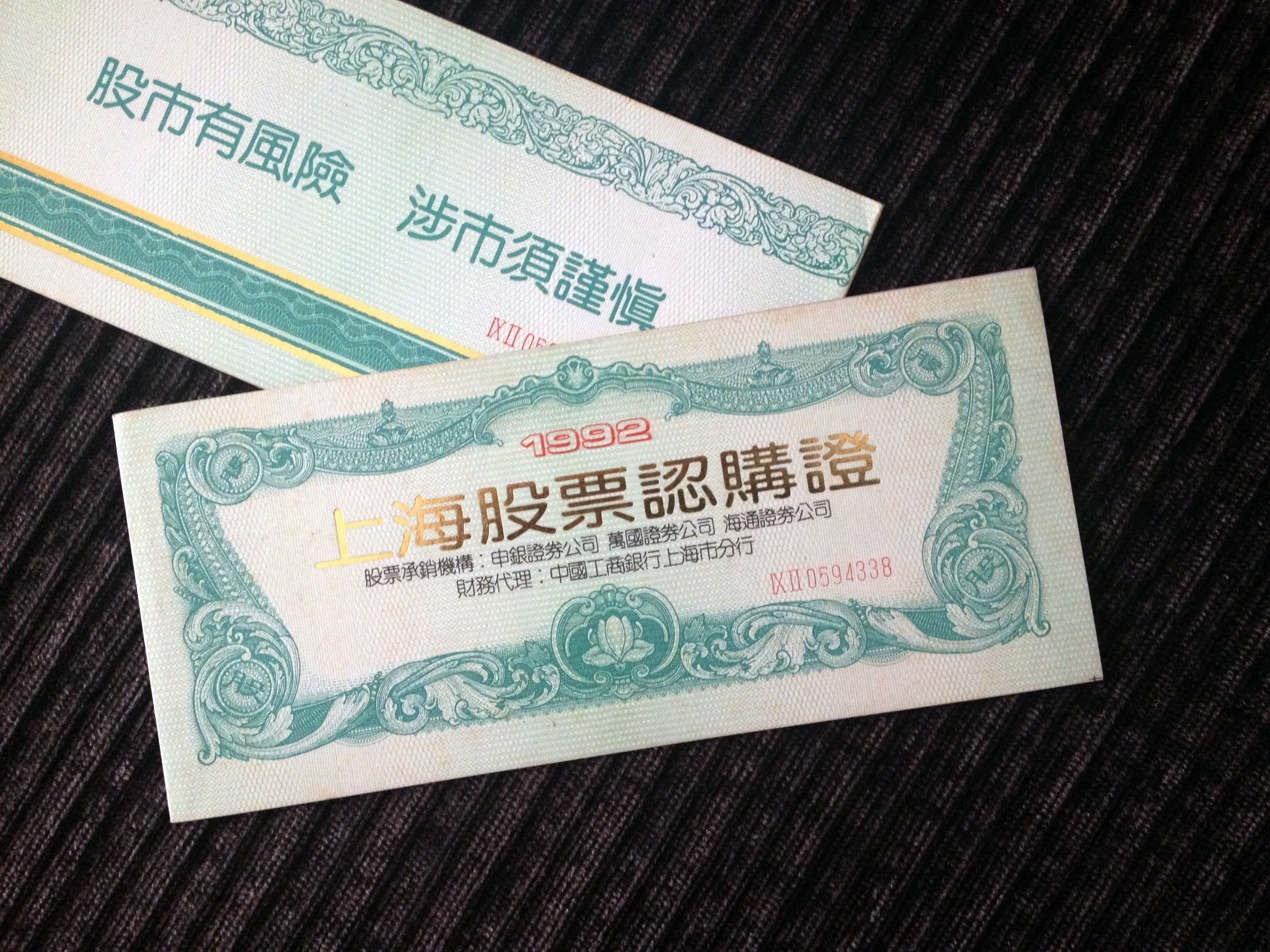
In 1992, the SSE issued its first stock warrant.

The Shanghai Stock Exchange (SSE) is a stock exchange based in the city of Shanghai, China. It is one of the three stock exchanges operating independently in mainland China, the others being the Beijing Stock Exchange and the Shenzhen Stock Exchange. The Shanghai Stock Exchange is the world's third-largest stock market by market capitalization, exceeding $10.21 trillion in May 2026. It is also Asia's biggest stock exchange. Unlike the Hong Kong Stock Exchange, the Shanghai Stock Exchange is still not entirely open to foreign investors and is often affected by the decisions of the central government due to capital account controls exercised by the Chinese authorities.

In 1891, Shanghai founded China's first exchange system. The current stock exchange was re-established on November 26, 1990, and was in operation on December 19 of the same year. It is a non-profit organization directly administered by the China Securities Regulatory Commission (CSRC).

== History ==
The formation of the International Settlement (foreign concession areas) in Shanghai was the result of the Treaty of Nanking of 1842 (which ended the First Opium War) and subsequent agreements between the Chinese and foreign governments were crucial to the development of foreign trade in China and of the foreign community in Shanghai. The market for securities trading in Shanghai begins in the late 1860s. The first shares list appeared in June 1866 and by then Shanghai's International Settlement had developed the conditions conducive to the emergence of a share market: several banks, a legal framework for joint-stock companies, and an interest in diversification among the established trading houses (although the trading houses themselves remained partnerships).

In the 1880s and 1890s, during the boom in mining shares, foreign businessmen founded the "Shanghai Sharebrokers' Association" headquartered in Shanghai as China's first stock exchange. In 1904, the Association applied for registration in Hong Kong under the provision of the Companies ordinance and was renamed as the "Shanghai Stock Exchange". The supply of securities came primarily from local companies. In the early days, banks dominated private shares but, by 1880, only the Hong Kong and Shanghai local banks remained.

Later in 1920 and 1921, "Shanghai Securities & Commodities Exchange" and "Shanghai Chinese Merchant Exchange" started operation respectively. An amalgamation eventually took place in 1929, and the combined markets operated thereafter as the "Shanghai Stock Exchange". Shipping, insurance, and docks persisted to 1940 but were overshadowed by industrial shares after the Treaty of Shimonoseki of 1895, which permitted Japan, and by extension other nations which had treaties with China, to establish factories in Shanghai and other treaty ports. Rubber plantations became the staple of stock trading beginning in the second decade of the 20th century.

By the 1930s, Shanghai had emerged as the financial center of the Far East, where both Chinese and foreign investors could trade stocks, debentures, government bonds, and futures. The operation of Shanghai Stock Exchange came to an abrupt halt after Japanese troops occupied the Shanghai International Settlement on December 8, 1941. In 1946, the Shanghai Stock Exchange resumed its operations before closing again 3 years later in 1949, after the Communist revolution took place.

After the Cultural Revolution ended and Deng Xiaoping rose to power, China was re-opened to the outside world in 1978. During the 1980s, China's securities market evolved in tandem with the country's economic reform and opening up and the development of socialist market economy. On 26 November 1990, the Shanghai Stock Exchange was re-established and operations began a few weeks later on 19 December.

The Shanghai Stock Exchange was under municipal control and termed an "experimental point" until 1997. In 1997, the central government brought the exchange (as well as the Shenzhen stock exchange) under central government control and affirmed that the exchanges had a legitimate role in the socialist market economy.

In 2019, the Shanghai Stock Exchange launched the STAR Market, featuring only technology-related companies, as a rival to the NASDAQ.

=== Timeline ===
The Shanghai (SSE) Composite Index: 1991 to start of 2009.

- 1866 – The first share list appeared in June.
- 1871 – Speculative bubble burst triggered by monetary panic.
- 1883 – Credit crisis resulted speculation in Chinese companies.
- 1890 – Bank crisis started from Hong Kong.
- 1891 – "Shanghai Sharebrokers Association" established.
- 1895 – Treaty of Shimonoseki opened Chinese market to foreign investors.
- 1904 – Renamed to "Shanghai Stock Exchange".
- 1909 – 1910 – Rubber boom.
- 1911 – Revolution and the abdication of the Qing dynasty. Founding of the Republic of China.
- 1914 – Market closed for a few months due to the Great War (World War I).
- 1919 – Speculation in cotton shares.
- 1925 – Second rubber boom.
- 1929 – "Shanghai Securities & Commodities Exchange" and "Shanghai Chinese Merchant Exchange" were merged into the existing Shanghai Stock Exchange.
- 1931 – Incursion of Japanese forces into northern China.
- 1930s – The market was dominated by the rubber share price movements.
- 1941 – The market closed on Friday, 5 December. Japanese troops occupied Shanghai.
- 1946 – 1949 – Temporary resumption of the Shanghai Stock Exchange until the communist revolution. Founding of the People's Republic of China in 1949.
- 1978 – Deng Xiaoping emerged as the dominant figure in China's leadership, beginning the reform and opening up.
- 1981 – Trading in treasury bonds was resumed.
- 1984 – Company stocks and corporate bonds emerged in Shanghai and a few other cities.
- 1988 - Ping An Insurance (Group) Company of China, Ltd., commonly known as Ping An, was founded in 1988 and is headquartered in Shenzhen, China.
- 1990 – The present Shanghai Stock Exchange re-opened on November 26 and began operation on December 19.
- 1992 – Deng Xiaoping's Southern Tour saved China's capital market and the two stock exchanges (the other is Shenzhen Stock Exchange)
- 1997 – The State Council of China decided that the Shanghai Stock Exchange would be directly managed by the China Securities Regulatory Commission.
- 2001 – 2005 – A four-year market slump which saw Shanghai's market value halved, after reaching a peak in 2001. A ban on new IPOs was put in April 2005 to curb the slump and allow more than US$200 billion of mostly state-owned equity to be converted to tradable shares.
- 2006 – The SSE resumed full operation as the yearlong ban on IPOs was lifted in May. The world's second largest (US$21.9 billion) IPO by the Industrial and Commercial Bank of China (ICBC) was launched in both Shanghai and Hong Kong stock markets.
- 2007 – 2008 – A "stock market frenzy" as speculative traders rush into the market, making China's stock exchange temporarily the world's second largest in terms of turnover. After reaching an all-time high of 6,124.044 points on October 16, 2007, the benchmark Shanghai Composite Index ended 2008 down a record 65% mainly due to the impact of the global economic crisis which started in mid-2008.
- 2010 – Agricultural Bank of China completed the world's largest IPO as of that year and until 2014, worth US$22.1 billion.
- 2015 – height variations on stocks' values, with solid raise in early 2015 followed by −30% fall in June–July.
- 2019 – Launched the STAR Market.

== Structure ==
The securities listed at the SSE include the three main categories of stocks, bonds, and funds. Bonds traded on SSE include treasury bonds (T-bond), corporate bonds, and convertible corporate bonds. SSE T-bond market is the most active of its kind in China. There are two types of stocks being issued in the Shanghai Stock Exchange: "A" shares and "B" shares. A shares are priced in the local renminbi yuan currency, while B shares are quoted in U.S. dollars. Initially, trading in A shares is restricted to domestic investors only while B shares are available to both domestic (since 2001) and foreign investors. However, after reforms were implemented in December 2002, foreign investors are now allowed (with limitations) to trade in A shares under the Qualified Foreign Institutional Investor (QFII) program which was officially launched in 2003. Currently, a total of 98 foreign institutional investors have been approved to buy and sell A shares under the QFII program. Quotas under the QFII program were US$30 billion and increased to US$80 billion as of April 2012. There has been a plan to eventually merge the two types of shares in the future.

== Trading times ==
The SSE is open for trading every Monday to Friday from 09:15 to 15:00. The morning session begins with centralized competitive pricing from 09:15 to 09:25, and continues with consecutive bidding from 09:30 to 11:30. This is followed by the afternoon consecutive bidding session, which starts from 13:00 to 14:57. The centralized competitive pricing starts again from 14:57 to 15:00 and continues with block trading from 15:00 to 15:30. The market is closed on Saturday and Sunday and other holidays announced by the SSE.

== Indices ==
The SSE Composite Index (also known as Shanghai Composite) Index is the most commonly used indicator to reflect SSE's market performance. Constituents for the SSE Composite Index are all listed stocks (A shares and B shares) at the Shanghai Stock Exchange. The Base Day for the SSE Composite Index is December 19, 1990. The Base Period is the total market capitalization of all stocks of that day. The Base Value is 100. The index was launched on July 15, 1991. At the end of 2006, the index reaches 2,675.47. Other important indexes used in the Shanghai Stock Exchanges include the SSE 50 Index and SSE 180 Index.

== SSE's Top 10 Largest Stocks ==
Source: Shanghai Stock Exchange (market values in RMB/Chinese Yuan). Data arranged by market value. Updated on August 27, 2020.

1. Kweichow Moutai known as GuiZhou MaoTai (2,174 billion)
2. Industrial and Commercial Bank of China (1,339 billion)
3. Agricultural Bank of China (1,027 billion)
4. China Life (897 billion)
5. Ping An Insurance (829 billion)
6. China Merchants Bank (761 billion)
7. PetroChina (717 billion)
8. Bank of China (691 billion)
9. Haitian Flavouring & Food (593 billion)
10. Hengrui Medicine as Hengrui Pharma (Jiangsu Hengrui Pharmaceuticals Co., Ltd) (499 billion)

== Listing requirements ==
According to the regulations of Securities Law of the People's Republic of China and Company Law of the People's Republic of China, limited companies applying for the listing of shares must meet the following criteria:

- The shares must have been publicly issued following approval of the State Council Securities Management Department.
- The company's total share capital must not be less than RMB 30 million.
- The company must have been in business for more than 3 years and have made profits over the last three consecutive years. This requirement also applies to former state-owned enterprises reincorporating as private or public enterprises. In the case of former state-owned enterprises re-established according to the law or founded after implementation of the law and if their issuers are large and medium state owned enterprises, it can be calculated consecutively. The number of shareholders with holdings of values reaching in excess of RMB 1,000 must not be less than 1,000 persons. Publicly offered shares must be more than 25% of the company's total share capital. For company whose total share capital exceeds RMB 400 million, the ratio of publicly offered shares must be more than 15%.
- The company must not have committed any major illegal activities or false accounting records in the last three years.

Other conditions stipulated by the State Council.

- China currently has a preference for domestic firms only to list onto their stock exchanges; India has similar rules. However, China considered opening up their capital markets to foreign firms in 2010.

The conditions for applications for the listing of shares by limited companies involved in high and new technology are set out separately by the State Council.

== Building ==
The SSE is housed at the Shanghai Securities Exchange Building since 1997.

== Other ownership ==
The Shanghai Stock Exchange owns a 40% stake in the Pakistan Stock Exchange (PSX). PSX is integrated with China's stock market through the China Connect Interface, allowing Chinese investors to more easily enter Pakistan's stock markets, the major categories of dominated domestic commodities

The Shanghai Stock Exchange is a part owner of the Astana International Financial Centre.

== See also ==
- China Securities Regulatory Commission
- Economy of China
- Hong Kong Stock Exchange
- Shenzhen Stock Exchange
- Shanghai Metal Exchange
- SSE Composite
- Untraded shares
- Leading stock
- Deng Xiaoping's Southern Tour

=== Lists ===
- List of Chinese companies
- List of stock exchanges
