= Hong Kong Exchanges and Clearing =

Hong Kong financial services holding company

Hong Kong Exchanges and Clearing Limited

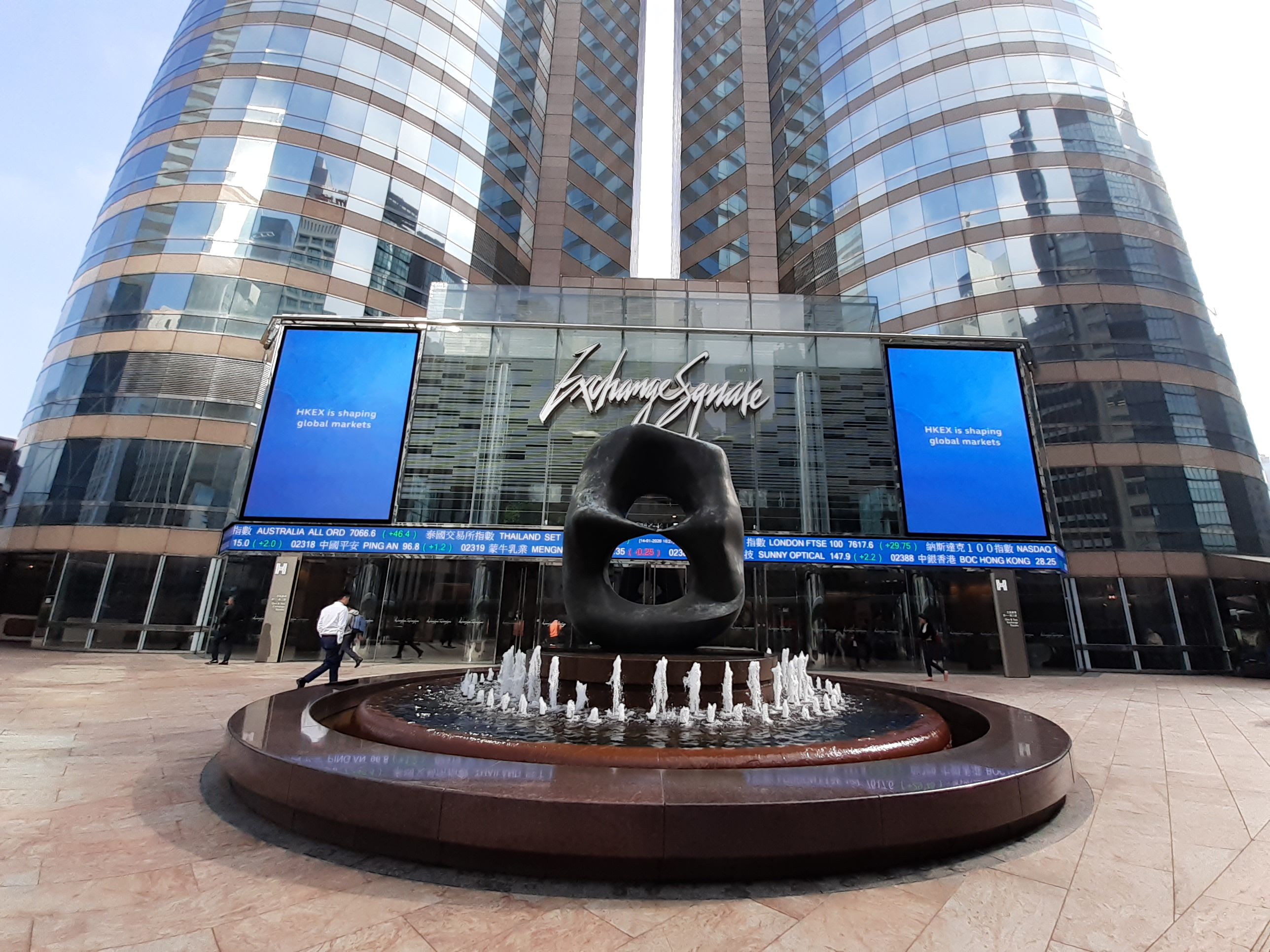
- Exchange Square entrance
- Native name: 香港交易及結算所有限公司 (d/b/a 香港交易所)
- Type: Public
- Traded as: SEHK: 388; S&P Asia 50 component; Hang Seng Index component
- Industry: Financial services
- Founded: March 6, 2000; 26 years ago
- Headquarters: Exchange Square, Central, Hong Kong
- Key people: Carlson Tong (Chairman); Bonnie Chan (CEO)
- Services: Shares, futures & options Trading
- Revenue: ▲HK$29,161 million (2025)
- Operating income: ▲HK$22,796 million (2025)
- Net income: ▲HK$17,754 million (2025)
- Total assets: ▲HK$486,575 million (2025)
- Total equity: ▲HK$62,568 million (2025)
- Subsidiaries: Stock Exchange of Hong Kong; Hong Kong Futures Exchange; Hong Kong Securities Clearing Company; London Metal Exchange
- Website: www.hkex.com.hk

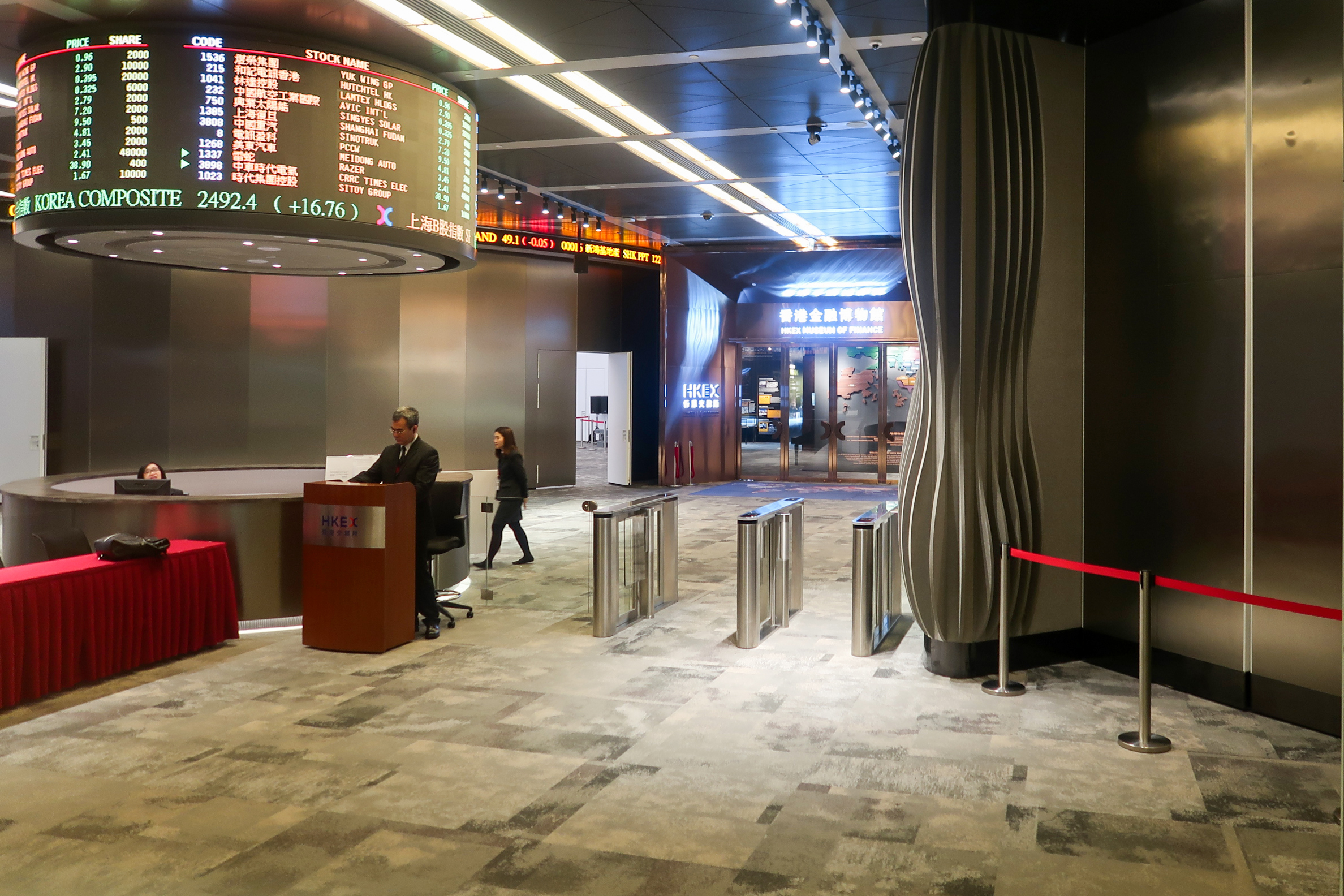
HKEX Connect Hall

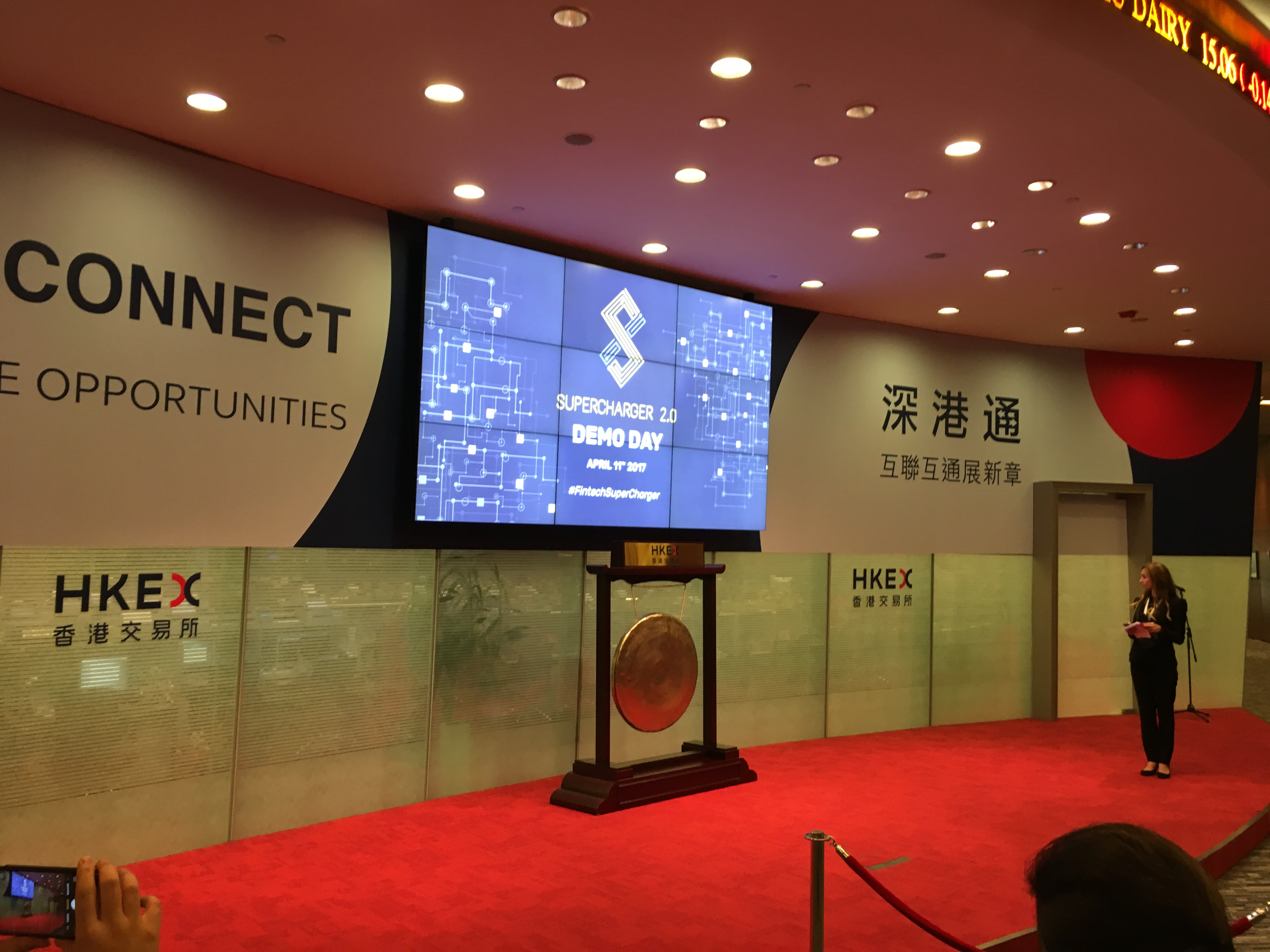
The stage where the HKEx holds market opening and closing ceremony

Hong Kong Exchanges and Clearing Limited (HKEX; Chinese: 香港交易及結算所有限公司; pinyin: Xiānggǎng jiāoyì jí jiésuàn suǒyǒu xiàn gōngsī) operates a range of equity, commodity, fixed income and currency markets through its wholly owned subsidiaries The Stock Exchange of Hong Kong Limited (SEHK), Hong Kong Futures Exchange Limited (HKFE) and London Metal Exchange (LME).

As of February 2026, HKEX has a market capitalization of approximately HK$48.5 trillion, or US$6.2 trillion, and 2,673 listed companies, making it the 6th largest stock exchange globally. As of late 2025, the Hong Kong Stock Exchange (HKEX) was the global leader in IPO proceeds, having regained its top spot after a strong year of listings from mainland companies.

The Group also operates four clearing houses in Hong Kong: Hong Kong Securities Clearing Company Limited (HKSCC), HKFE Clearing Corporation Limited (HKCC), the SEHK Options Clearing House Limited (SEOCH) and OTC Clearing Hong Kong Limited (OTC Clear). HKSCC, HKCC and SEOCH provide integrated clearing, settlement, depository and nominee activities to their participants, while OTC Clear provides over-the-counter (OTC) interest rate derivatives and non-deliverable forwards clearing and settlement services to its members. HKEX provides market data through its data dissemination subsidiary, the HKEX Information Services Limited.

The Hong Kong Government is the single largest shareholder in HKEX, and has the right to appoint six of the thirteen directors to the board.

== History ==
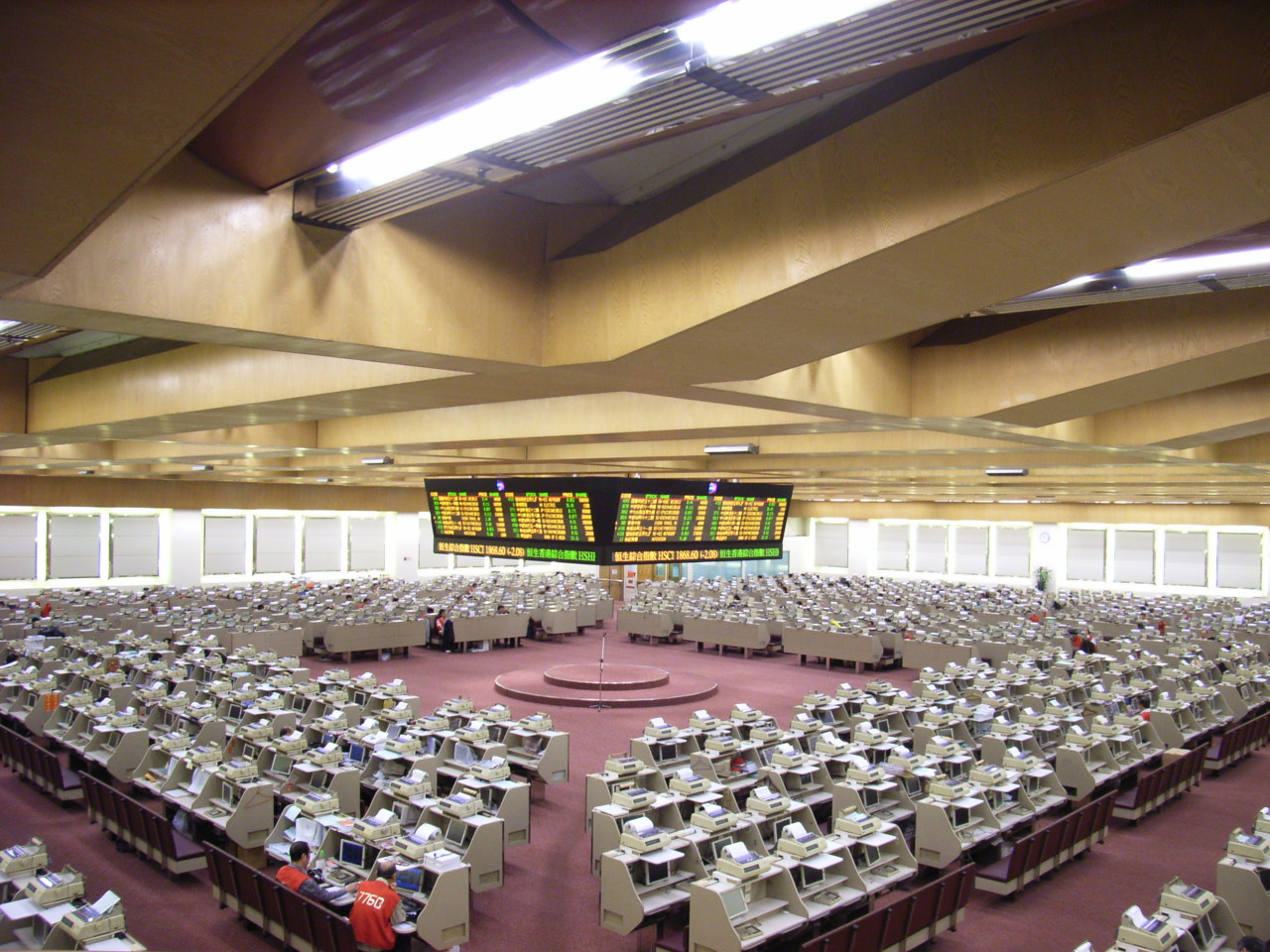
Exchange Hall used from 1985 to 2005

=== Securities market ===
Reports of securities trading in Hong Kong date back to the mid-19th century. However, the first formal market, the Association of Stockbrokers in Hong Kong, was not established until 1891. The Association was renamed the Hong Kong Stock Exchange in 1914.

A second exchange, the Hong Kong Stockbrokers' Association was incorporated in 1921. The two exchanges merged to form the Hong Kong Stock Exchange in 1947 and re-establish the stock market after the Second World War. Rapid growth of the Hong Kong economy led to the establishment of three other exchanges – the Far East Exchange in 1969; the Kam Ngan Stock Exchange in 1971; and the Kowloon Stock Exchange in 1972.

Pressure to strengthen market regulation and to unify the four exchanges led to the incorporation of SEHK, the Stock Exchange of Hong Kong Limited in 1980. The four exchanges ceased business on 27 March 1986 and the new exchange commenced trading through a computer-assisted system on 2 April 1986. Prior to the completion of the merger with HKFE in March 2000, the unified stock exchange had 570 participant organisations.

Hong Kong Securities Clearing Company Limited was incorporated in 1989. It created CCASS, the central clearing and settlement system, which started operating in 1992 and became the central counterparty for all CCASS participants.

==== Penny stocks fiasco ====
In April 2002, HKEX launched a study to consider the delisting of "penny stocks" to improve market efficiency. Its 25 July 2002 proposal to cancel listings of companies trading below HK$0.50 for 30 straight days hit penny stocks hard. Seventeen companies' shares lost more than 30 per cent of their value, and about HK$6 billion in market capitalisation was wiped off 105 listed companies. Activist investor David Webb said that HKEX's desire to delist stemmed from these companies generating very little revenue for the exchange but taking up a disproportionate amount of staff resources. Webb decried the conflict of interest between its role as operator and regulator, and called on the regulatory role to be passed to the SFC.

On 10 September 2002, a government report was released which found HKEX Chief Executive Kwong Ki-chi guilty of administrative mistakes and said he "should be held responsible on behalf of the HKEX for any major policy shortcomings in the preparation and release of the consultation paper".

=== Base metals market ===
In June 2012, HKEX announced its cash offer to acquire the London Metal Exchange (LME), the world's premier metal exchange since its founding in 1877, for GBP1.388 billion. The acquisition was completed in December 2012.

HKEX is also the majority owner of the Qianhai Mercantile Exchange, a commodities trading platform in mainland China which has yet to officially begin operations. The Qianhai Authority has given the green light to HKEX to set up the commodities platform in the special economic zone, but official crackdowns on spot trading platforms in mainland China have caused a delay.

=== Merger speculation ===
After the New York Stock Exchange announced in November 2006 that it would open an office in Beijing to work with the Shanghai Stock Exchange, Hong Kong Exchanges and Clearing chairman Ronald Arculli dampened speculation, saying it has no immediate plans to acquire or merge with other exchanges, but would focus on "strengthening our competitiveness and reviewing our listing fees".

In September 2019 Hong Kong Exchanges and Clearing made a proposal to the London Stock Exchange to merge the two companies in a cash and share deal worth £29.6 billion, or £31.6 billion ($39 billion) including debt. If the deal had gone through, the combined exchange would have been the world's third largest after the New York Stock Exchange and NASDAQ in terms of the total value of the companies on the exchanges.

=== Infrastructure ===
Computers were integrated on 2 April 1986, which has helped modernise the system. In 1993 the exchange launched the "Automatic Order Matching and Execution System" (AMS) that was replaced by the third generation system (AMS/3) in October 2000.

In February 2018, AMS/3 was replaced by the "Orion Trading Platform - Securities Market" (OTP-C).

=== Trading hours ===
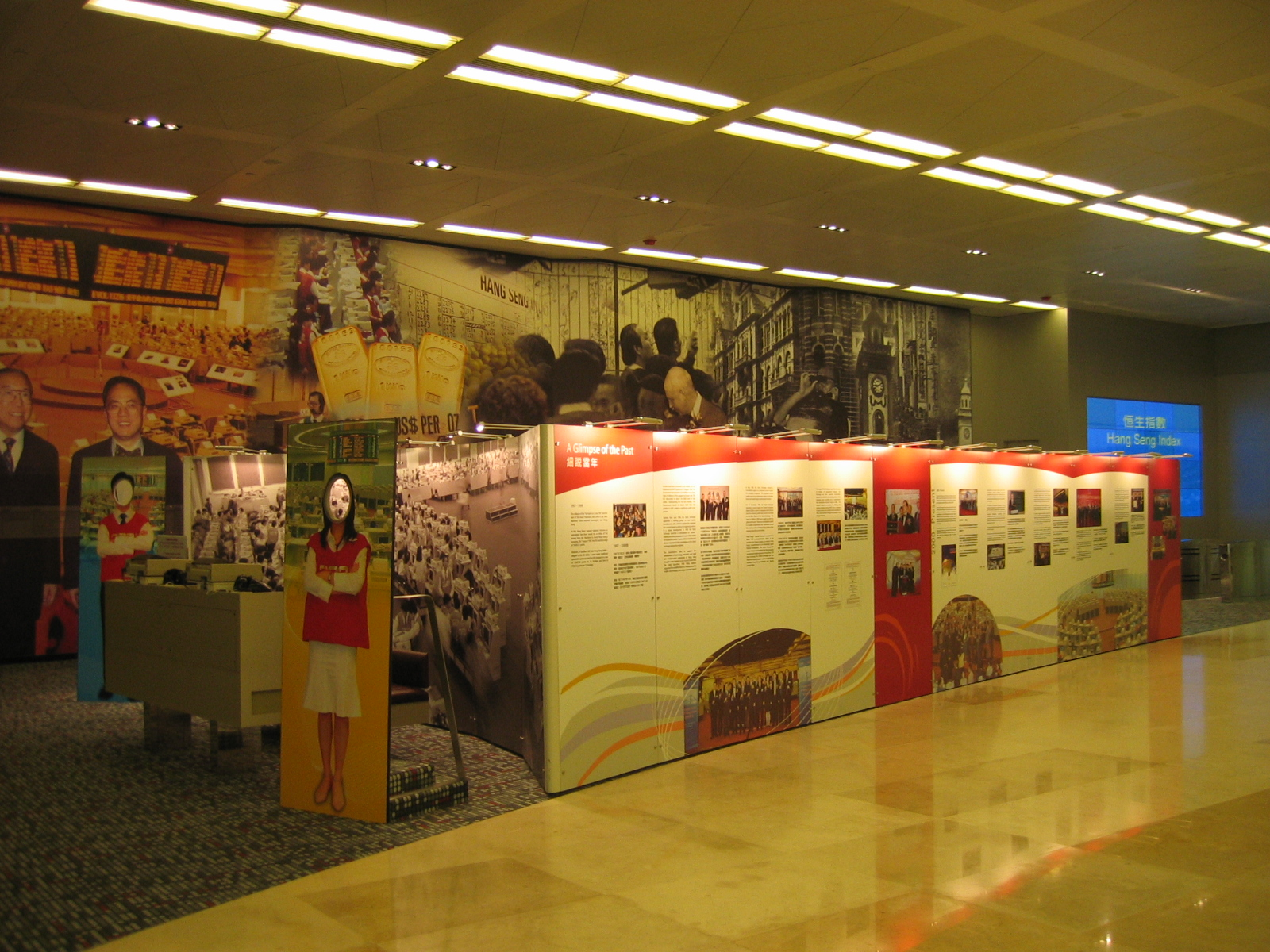
The Exchange Exhibition Hall

HKEX's morning session runs from 09:00 am to 12:00 pm; the extended morning session is from 12:00 pm until 1:00 pm and the afternoon session is from 1:00 pm to 4:00 pm.

HKEX implemented a Closing Auction Session (CAS) in two phases on 25 July 2016 and 24 July 2017. The securities eligible for the CAS include all constituents of the Hang Seng Composite LargeCap, MidCap and SmallCap indices, H shares which have corresponding A shares listed on a mainland exchange and all exchange traded funds. It also includes some regulated short-selling orders.

A Volatility Control Mechanism (VCM), which functions similarly to circuit breakers on US exchanges, was implemented in the securities and derivatives markets on 22 August 2016 and 16 January 2017, respectively.

=== Products ===
Major securities products include equity securities, depositary receipts, debt securities, unit trusts/mutual funds (i.e. ETFs and REITs) and structured products. Derivative products include index and stock futures and options, interest rate and fixed income products and gold futures.

== Senior leadership ==
=== Chairmen ===
#	Name	Tenure start	Tenure end	Tenure length
1	Charles Lee Yeh-kwong, GBM, GBS, JP	12 April 2000	26 April 2006	6 years and 15 days
2	Ronald Joseph Arculli, GBM, GBS, JP	28 April 2006	23 April 2012	5 years and 362 days
3	Sir Chow Chung-kong, GBM, GBS, JP	27 April 2012	25 April 2018	5 years and 364 days
4	Laura Cha Shih May-lung, GBM, GBS, JP	4 May 2018	24 April 2024	5 years and 357 days
5	Carlson Tong Ka-shing, GBS, JP	3 May 2024	Incumbent	2 years and 178 days

=== Chief Executives ===
#	Name	Tenure start	Tenure end	Tenure length
1	Kwong Ki-chi, GBS	6 March 2000	15 April 2003	3 years and 41 days
–	Frederick John Gerde (interim)	16 April 2003	30 April 2003	15 days
2	Paul Chow Man-yiu, GBS	1 May 2003	15 January 2010	6 years and 260 days
3	Charles Li Xiaojia, SBS	16 January 2010	31 December 2020	10 years and 351 days
–	Calvin Tai Chi-kin (interim)	1 January 2021	23 May 2021	143 days
4	Nicolas Alejandro Aguzin	24 May 2021	29 February 2024	2 years and 282 days
5	Bonnie Chan Yiting	1 March 2024	Incumbent	2 years and 241 days

== Controversies ==
=== Government share purchase ===
In September 2007, the government revealed that it had increased its stake in HKEX from 4.41 percent to 5.88 percent. According to market sources, the Government spent HK$2.44 billion to buy 15.72 million shares in the company. The stake would be held by the Exchange Fund as a "strategic asset".

The move has drawn widespread criticism in Hong Kong and abroad: governance advocate and board member David Webb said that the government was the second-largest single investor in the Hong Kong market after Beijing, with a portfolio of local equities estimated to be worth about HK$150 billion. He said the purchase violated the government's stated principle of "big market, small government", adding that it increased uncertainty and sends a very negative signal to the market as a whole; the Civic Party criticised the Government for damaging public confidence in the capital market, and interfering with the stock exchange's independence; a Wall Street Journal editorial said that the Hong Kong Government is further interfering in the market to "cozy up to China's tightly controlled domestic exchanges". Financial commentator Jake van der Kamp noted the Financial Secretary's conundrum: The government is faced with a conflict of interest, as its desire for an efficient marketplace is contrary to its desire as a shareholder, who would prefer to maximise returns.

The government said that it wanted to play a positive role in the stock exchange's development as a shareholder. Analysts expect the government will continue to increase its stake, as HKEX is being prepared "for future integration and alliance with mainland exchanges". Another analyst was concerned about the independence of "independent chairman" Ronald Arculli, who also sits on the Executive Council.

=== Regulation to extend directors' trading blackout ===
Between 11 January 2008 and 7 April 2008, HKEX launched a consultation paper proposing changes to the Listing Rules "to address 18 substantive policy issues pertaining to corporate governance and initial listing criteria". On 28 November 2008, new rules were announced which included, inter alia, limitation of directors' trading in their companies' shares between the end of each semester until after publication of its results. The Listing Rule amendments were due to become effective on 1 January 2009. The previous blackout period is within one month of publication, and was considered by HKEx to "fail to ensure that insiders do not abuse the market while in possession of unpublished price-sensitive information".

In mid-December, legislators representing the functional constituencies, led by Abraham Razack, Chim Pui Chung and David Li, demanded that regulators postponed the execution of a prolonged blackout proposal. Razack said HKEx did not consult widely enough and the process was a "black- box operation" that did not reflect industry opinion; David Webb said that the campaign was due to some well-connected tycoons and company directors' rearguard action to derail the rule change. On 30 December 2008, the Listing Committee said it would not withdraw the new rule because it would "have a long-term benefit on the market. However it postponed the rules' introduction by three months."

=== CEO's alleged involvement in "princeling" hirings ===
In 2015, the Wall Street Journal reported that the CEO of the exchange at the time, Charles Li, while he was chairman of JP Morgan China from 2003 to 2009, recommended hiring the children and associates of Chinese officials, clients and potential future clients. At the time, JP Morgan was investigated by the US Securities and Exchange Commission and the US Department of Justice into possible violation of anti-bribery laws by improperly hiring relatives of Chinese officials, known as "princelings", to win business.

== See also ==
- Hang Seng Index
- Economy of Hong Kong
- Hong Kong Precious Metals Central Clearing Company, launched in July 2026
- List of Chinese companies
- Companies listed on the Hong Kong Stock Exchange
- List of East Asian stock exchanges
- List of stock exchanges
- CCP Global
