= Bonnie Chan =

Hong Kong business executive (born 1970)

Bonnie Chan Yi-ting
- 陳翊庭
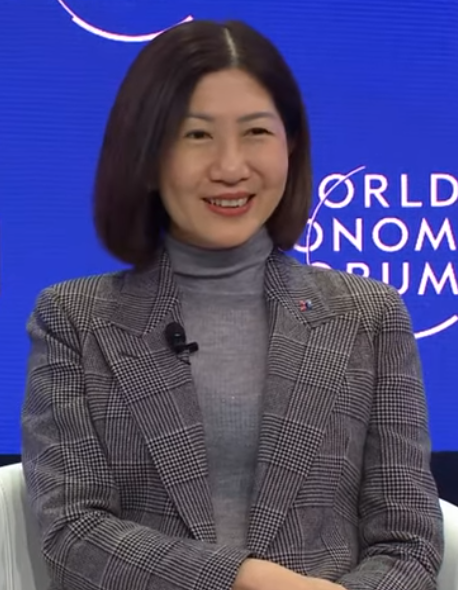
- Chan at the World Economic Forum Annual Meeting in 2025
- Born: 1970 (age 55–56); British Hong Kong
- Other name: Chan Yuen-man (陳婉文)
- Education: Maryknoll Convent School; University of Hong Kong (LLB); Harvard Law School (LLM)
- Title: CEO of Hong Kong Exchanges and Clearing
- Predecessor: Nicolas Aguzin

Chinese name
- Traditional Chinese: 陳翊庭
- Simplified Chinese: 陈翊庭
Transcriptions
Standard Mandarin
- Hanyu Pinyin: Chén Yì Tíng
Yue: Cantonese
- Yale Romanization: Chàhn Yihk Tìhng
- Jyutping: Can4 Jik6 Ting4

Bonnie Chan Yi-ting (Chinese: 陳翊庭; Cantonese Yale: Chàhn Yihk Tìhng; born 1970) is a Hong Kong business executive. As of April 2026, she is the chief executive officer (CEO) of Hong Kong Exchange and Clearing (HKEX) since 1 March 2024.

In 2025, Chan ranked 63rd in the Forbes list of World's 100 Most Powerful Women. Time magazine named her on the Time 100 list of the world's most influential people in 2025.

== Early life ==
Chan was born and raised in Hong Kong. She attended Maryknoll Convent School. After obtaining a Bachelor of Laws from the University of Hong Kong, Chan went to the US to obtain a Master of Laws from Harvard Law School.

== Career ==
Chan started her career as a lawyer at Deacons in Hong Kong in 1993. After that she then moved on to join Sullivan & Cromwell to practice as a lawyer in both Hong Kong and the US. She also worked at Skadden, Arps, Slate, Meagher & Flom.

In 2000, Chan made a career switch to join Deutsche Bank as an investment banker in the equity capital markets division. However, due to bad timing from the Dot-com bubble and the 2002–2004 SARS outbreak there were not many deals.

In 2003, Chan joined Morgan Stanley as an in-house counsel that covered its investment banking division.

In 2007, Chan first joined HKEX as Head of IPO transactions.

In 2010, Chan became a Partner at Davis Polk. During her tenure as Partner, she was part of Financial Services Department Council for seven years. She produced seven research papers suggesting reforming the stock market and enhancing Hong Kong's role as a capital fundraising center.

In 2020, Chan rejoined HKEX as Head of listing. In 2022, Chan introduced the special-purpose acquisition company (SPAC) listings reform and in April 2023, the Chapter 18C listing regime which allows pre-revenue specialist technology companies to list. In November 2023, Chan led the launch of the Fast Interface for New Issuance (FINI) system which shortened the settlement cycle from five to two days modernising the IPO settlement process. HKEX also expanded the weighted voting rights regime, under which shares held by founder shareholders carry more voting rights than those held by others. This helped to attract more US-listed Chinese technology firms to seek secondary listings in Hong Kong.

In February 2024, Chan was promoted to co-chief operating officer.

On 1 March 2024, Chan was appointed as CEO of HKEX to replace Nicolas Aguzin. She is the first woman to hold the position.

Bonnie Y Chan was reappointed as CEO of HKEX for a second three-year term, running from March 1, 2027, to February 28, 2030. The decision was approved by the HKEX Board and ratified by Hong Kong’s Securities and Futures Commission.

== Personal life ==
Chan previously went by the name Chan Yuen-man (陳婉文).

Chan engages in weight training which she developed an interest during the COVID-19 pandemic.

Business positions
Preceded by Nicolas Aguzin	Chief Executive of the Hong Kong Exchanges and Clearing; 2024–present	Succeeded by Incumbent
