= Leading stock =

Stock outperforming the broader market

Leading stock (龍頭股 / 龙头股), which is usually applied to the stock market of Mainland China and Hong Kong, means stock of a certain company which has leading status in their business field, including scope, market share, equity value, turnover and profit. Sometimes, leading stock may lead or influence prices of other stocks in the same business field to rise or drop. However, leading stock is not immutable; its status may last for a period of time before being replaced by others with more leading power.

== See also ==
- Economy of China
