= List of airfields of the Army Air Corps (United Kingdom) =

This is a list of airfields of the military aviation division of the British Army, the Army Air Corps, from 1 September 1957.

== Current airfields ==
airfield	previous name	dates of AAC use	notes
Wattisham Flying Station, Suffolk	RAF Wattisham (Wattisham Airfield)	July 1993 -	
Middle Wallop Flying Station, Hampshire	RAF Middle Wallop (Middle Wallop Airfield)	1957 -	
Aldergrove Flying Station, Northern Ireland	RAF Aldergrove (JHC FS Aldergrove)	1960s -	
Stirling Lines, Herefordshire	RAF Credenhill (RAF Hereford)	2000 -	
RNAS Yeovilton (HMS Heron), Somerset		2015 -	
RAF Barkston Heath, Lincolnshire		1996 -	

== Previous airfields ==
Home bases and deployment airfields:

airfield	country	previous name	dates of AAC use	notes
Airport Camp, Ladyville	British Honduras (Belize)			Northside of runway
Alanbrooke Barracks, North Yorkshire	England	RAF Topcliffe	1974–1992	now used by 4th Regiment Royal Artillery
Ali Al Salem Air Base, Jahra Governorate	Kuwait		2000s	
Al Jubail Airfield, Eastern Province	Saudi Arabia		1990s	
Atkinson Field, Demerara-Mahaica	British Guiana (Guyana)			
Ballykinler, County Down	Northern Ireland			
Basra International Airport, Basra Governorate	Iraq		2000s	
Belize Airfield, Ladyville	British Honduras (Belize)			South side of runway
Bessbrook, County Armagh	Northern Ireland			
Birdwood Barracks, Bünde, North Rhine-Westphalia	Germany			
Bournemouth Barracks, Soltau, Lower Saxony	Germany			
Brunei Airport, Brunei–Muara District	Brunei		1960s	
RAF Bückeburg, Lower Saxony	Germany			
Caithness Barracks, Verden, Lower Saxony	Germany			
Coypool, Marsh Mills, Plymouth, Devon	England			
RAF Debden, Essex	England			
Dishforth Airfield, North Yorkshire	England	RAF Dishforth	1992–2016	now used by 6 Regiment RLC
Dhekelia Airfield, Larnaca Bay	Akrotiri and Dhekelia			
RAF Eastleigh, Nairobi City County	Kenya			
Falaise Airfield, Little Aden	Aden (Yemen)		1960s	
Farnborough, Hampshire	England			
RAF Feltwell, Norfolk	England			
RAF Gatow, Berlin	Germany			
Harewood Barracks, Herford	Germany			
Hobart Barracks, Detmold, North Rhine-Westphalia	Germany			
Ipoh, Perak	British Malaya (Malaysia)		1960s	
Javelin Barracks, Elmpt, North Rhine-Westphalia	Germany			
RAF Kai Tak, Kowloon	Hong Kong (China)			
Kangaw Barracks, Sembawang	Singapore			
Kermia (Metehan), Nicosia District	Cyprus			East of Mammari
RAF Khormaksar, Khor Maksar	Aden (Yemen)		1967	
Kirkee Barracks, Colchester, Essex	England			
Kluang, Johor	British Malaya (Malaysia)		1960s	
Kuching, Sarawak	British Malaya (Malaysia)		1960s	
Kuwait Airport, Farwaniya Governorate	Kuwait			
RAF Lakatamia, Nicosia District	Cyprus			
RAF Leuchars, Fife	Scotland			
Lisanelly Barracks, Omagh, County Tyrone	Northern Ireland			
Long Pasia (Long Pa Sia), Sabah	British Malaya (Malaysia)		1960s	
Magherafelt, County Londonderry	Northern Ireland			
McMunn Barracks, Colchester, Essex	England			
Airfield Camp, Netheravon, Wiltshire	England	RAF Netheravon	1964–2012	now used by the Joint Services Parachute Centre
RAF Nicosia, Nicosia District	Cyprus			
Noble Field, Kuala Lumpur	British Malaya (Malaysia)		1960s	
RAF Oakington, Cambridgeshire	England			
RAF Odiham, Hampshire	England			
Ogle Airstrip, Georgetown	British Guiana (Guyana)			
RAF Old Sarum, Wiltshire	England			
Paroi, Seremban	British Malaya (Malaysia)		1960s	
Perham Down, Wiltshire	England			
Piggery Ridge, Creggan Estate, Londonderry	Northern Ireland			
Princess Royal Barracks, Gutersloh, North Rhine-Westphalia	Germany			
Quebec Barracks, Osnabruck, North Rhine-Westphalia	Germany			
Ripon Barracks, Bielefeld, North Rhine-Westphalia	Germany			
Salamanca Barracks, Soest, North Rhine-Westphalia	Germany			
Scout Base, Seria, Belait District	Brunei			
RAF Seletar, North-East Region	Singapore			
Shackleton Barracks, County Londonderry	Northern Ireland	RAF Ballykelly		
RAF Sek Kong, New Territories	Hong Kong (China)			
RAF Sembawang, North Region	Singapore			
Seremban, Negeri Sembilan	British Malaya (Malaysia)		1960s	
Sharjah, Emirate of Sharjah	Trucial States (United Arab Emirates)			
Sha Tin Airfield, New Territories	Hong Kong (China)	RAF Shatin	1950s–1970s	
RAF Shawbury, Shropshire	England			
Sibu, Sarawak	British Malaya (Malaysia)		1960s	
RAF St Angelo, County Fermanagh	Northern Ireland			
St George's Barracks, Minden, North Rhine-Westphalia	Germany			
CFB Suffield, Alberta	Canada			
Taiping, Perak	British Malaya (Malaysia)		1960s	
Terendak, Malacca	British Malaya (Malaysia)		1960s	
RAF Habilayn, Radfan District	Aden (Yemen)		1964 - 1967	
Tofrek Barracks East, Hildesheim, Lower Saxony	Germany			
RAF Topcliffe, North Yorkshire	England		1968 – 1974	now Alanbrooke Barracks
RAF Turnhouse, Edinburgh	Scotland			
Waterloo Barracks, Munster, Lower Saxony	Germany			
RAF Wildenrath, North Rhine-Westphalia	Germany			
Wilson Field, Nairobi	Kenya			

== See also ==
- List of British Army installations
- List of Royal Air Force stations
  - List of former Royal Air Force stations
  - List of V Bomber dispersal bases
  - List of Battle of Britain airfields
  - List of UK Thor missile bases
- List of air stations of the Royal Navy
- List of airports in the United Kingdom and the British Crown Dependencies
- Lists of military installations
