= Fanling Airstrip =

Former airstrip in Hong Kong

Coordinates: 22.4939°N 114.1158°E

Fanling Airstrip (Chinese: 粉嶺機場) was a military airstrip in the race course, Fanling, New Territories, Hong Kong.

In May 1949, when the 1st Independent Field Squadron of the Royal Engineers arrived from British Malaya, they built a temporary military airstrip on the ninth fairway (located at the Hong Kong Golf Club's fairway to number 9 hole), let the 2-seater spotter aircraft of the Royal Artillery to use for patrolling the British-Sino boundary for a few weeks before moving on (the unit departed Hong Kong in February 1950).

The airfield disappeared when the Golf Course resumed operations in the early 1950s.

== See also ==
- List of airports in Hong Kong
- Former Overseas RAF Stations
- Hong Kong Aviation Club
