= List of airports in China (disambiguation) =

List of airports in China may refer to:

- List of airports in China (People's Republic of China)
- List of airports in Taiwan (Republic of China)

See also:

- List of airports in Hong Kong
- List of airports in Macau
