= Aviation history of Hong Kong =

The Aviation history of Hong Kong began in Sha Tin on 18 March 1911, when Belgian pilot Charles den Born successfully took off on an Farman II biplane nicknamed "Wanda" from Sha Tin Airfield. A working replica of the aircraft named the Spirit of Sha Tin (Chinese: 沙田精神號) is hung at the new Chep Lap Kok airport above the arrivals hall.

== Kai Tak and Chek Lap Kok ==
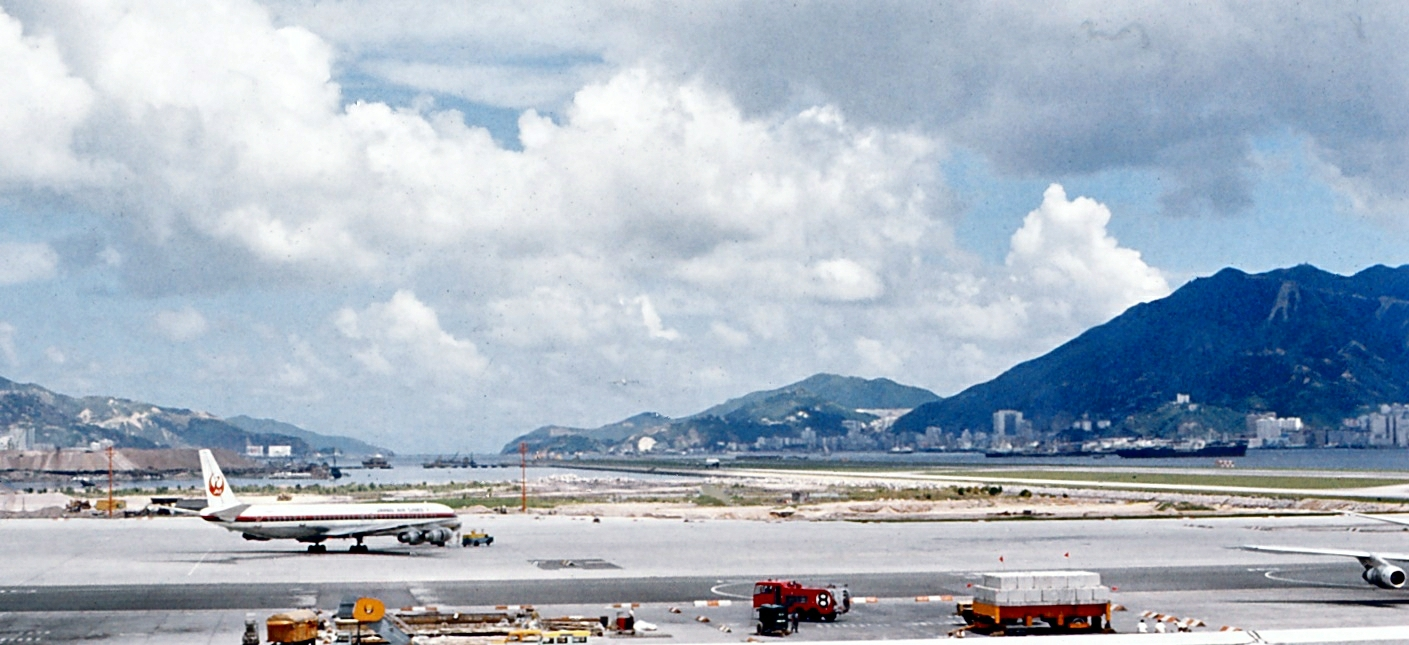
Apron view of Kai Tak in the 1970s

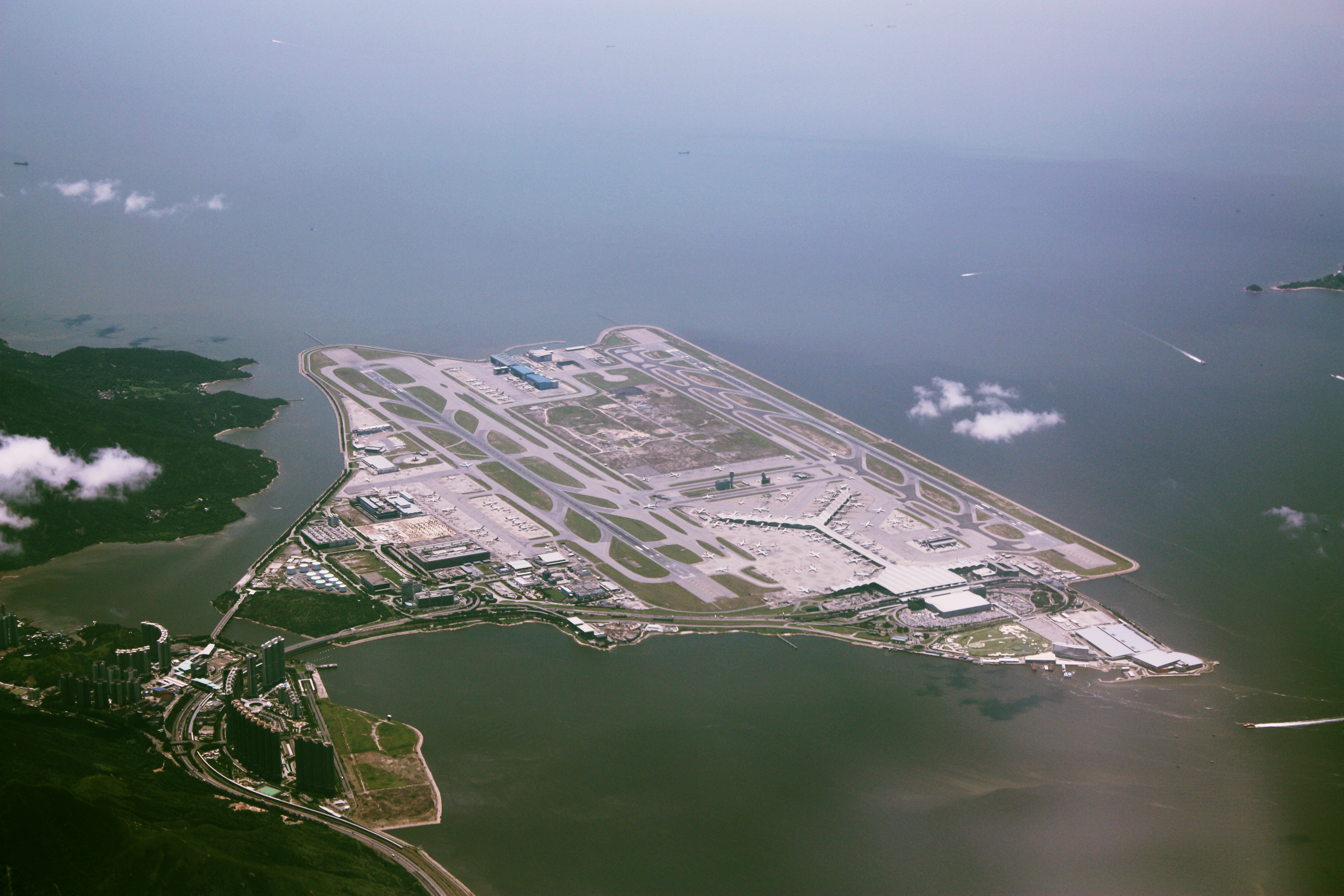
Aerial view of the new airport in the 2010

The year 1924 was a critical point of aviation history of Hong Kong, when the story of Kai Tak began. The location of Kai Tak belonged to two billionaire friends Ho Kai and Au Tak, who owned the land before the government acquired the land (the land originally did not have a name), which explains the name of the airport. First planned as an estate site, the land was given to the government after the plan failed. It soon became a small airport for the Royal Air Force, flying clubs and pilot training centre.

The first domestic airline company was set up in 1936. Later during the second World War, the runway was expanded. In 1962 the passenger terminal was completed, and Kai Tak became an international airport, renamed Hong Kong International Airport. But it continued to be referred to by its popular name, Kai Tak Airport. Within a couple of decades, it became clear that the current airport was inadequate. The airport itself was now surrounded by more private buildings, making further land acquisition and expansion impossible. To reduce the impact of noisy aircraft on nearby residents, there was a curfew in place. It was decided to look for a new area, which could fit a huge airport, built from scratch. In the early 90s, construction on a new airport, outside the busy Hong Kong central area, began at Chep Lap Kok, 30 km to the west of Kai Tak. This new airport is built on reclaimed land and the reclamation process involved joining Lam Chau island with Chep Lap Kok island. The old airport at Kai Tak finally retired at midnight 5 July 1998, and the new Hong Kong International Airport and began service in the morning of the following day. Recently, a couple of new airport buildings were opened to help with the increasing number of travellers. There are many talks at present, to extend the current airport in the years to come.

Many aviation enthusiasts were upset with the demise of Kai Tak because of the unique approach. As private aviation is not allowed at Chek Lap Kok, some enthusiasts had lobbied to keep around 1 km of the Kai Tak runway for private aviation; this was permitted for a while, but later on the Government recommended that a new cruise terminal at Kai Tak be built. In the meantime, a golf course was built at the end of the runway, this was later removed, to make way for cruise terminal construction equipment.

Hong Kong International Airport handled some 73 million travellers in 2017. Just around 50% of them were coming to or from Hong Kong, while 20% were coming to or from surrounding areas in the Pearl River Delta, and 30% were transferred to other international or mainland flights. Around 2/3 of passengers are coming or going to the Mainland and Southeast and Northern Asia, with the rest on longer-haul routes.

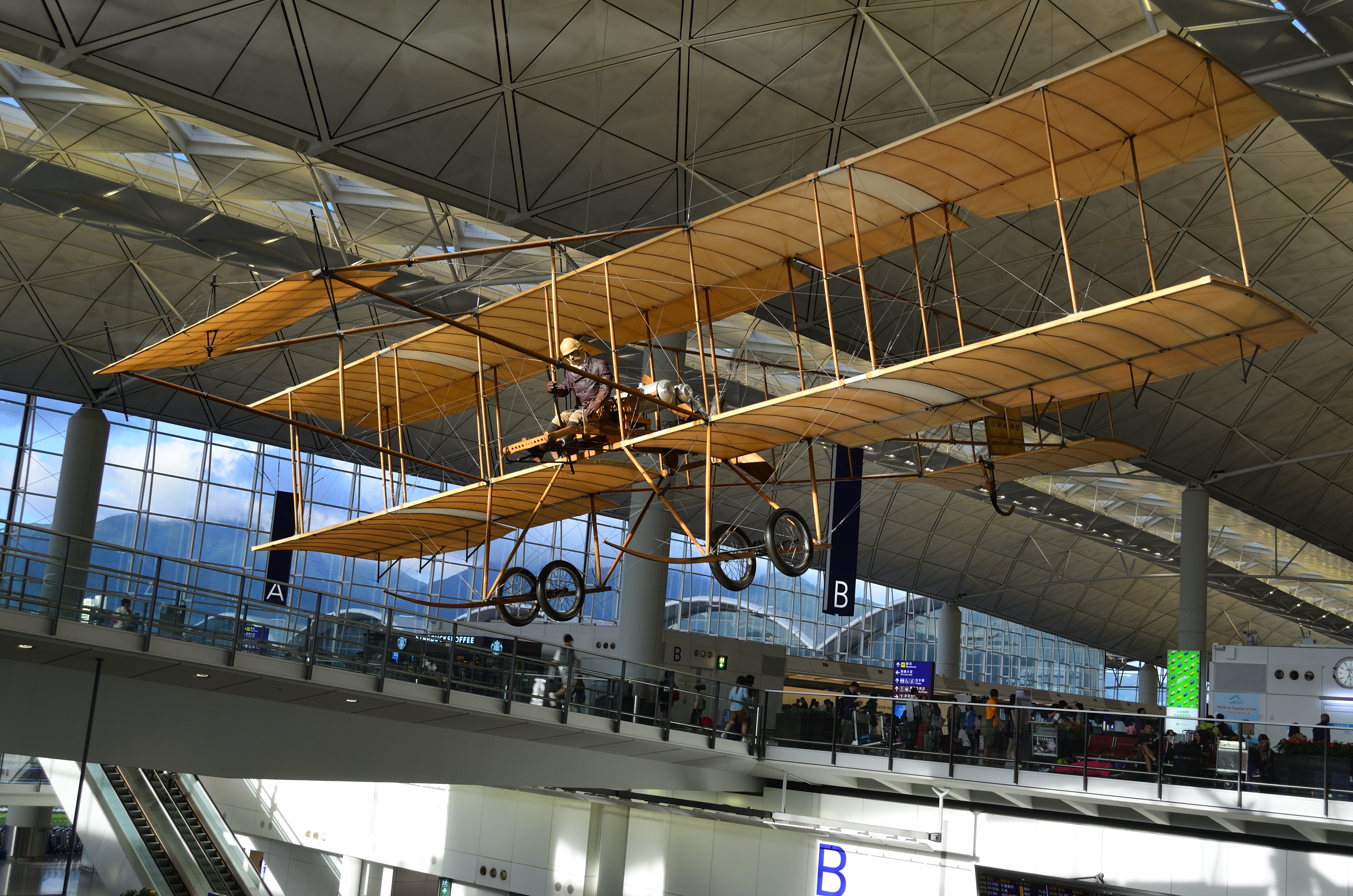
Spirit of Sha Tin in Hong Kong International Airport

== History ==
=== Before the 1950s ===
1936 was a memorable year for Hong Kong commercial Aviation, the first commercial airline -Imperial Airways (British Airways)operated by DH-86A Propeller biplane departed from London via Marseille, Rome, Athens, Alexandra, Baghdad, Kuwait, Delhi, Calcutta, Rangoon, Penang, Saigon and finally arrived Hong Kong. Airplane Ticket price was 175 pound including hotel fee in each city, but this was a massive price at that time.

During the same period, Pan Am Airline. "Hong Kong clipper" operated a route from San Francisco to Hong Kong.

=== 1950s to 1970s ===
On May 1, 1946, the Hong Kong civil aviation department was established and became a member of ICAO after it provided higher efficiency on flight control which increased airline capacity that attracted more airline settled routine to Hong Kong. September 20 of the same year, Cathay Pacific registered as the first Airline Company in Hong Kong.

There were 13 airlines running a business at that period; China Airlines (Air China), Central Air Transport, Cathay Pacific, Philippine Airline, Asian Airline, British Airways, Pan Am Airline, Pacific International Airline, Macau Airline, Air France, Thai Airways International, Varna Air-Siam.

Due to competition, plane ticket price reduced. The highest Plane ticket price at that period was HKD 4211 from Hong Kong to San Francisco. But this was still exorbitant pricing to most people. An international plane ticket could be a quarter of the price of a house.

=== 1970s to 1990s ===
Many factors were bursting Hong Kong airline industry, such as the transformation of economic, wide-body jet aircraft like the Boeing 747 & DC-10 and the new terminal in Kai Tak airport. According to the civil aviation department statistics, both passenger flights and cargo freight doubled from 1975 to 1985.

Due to the 747 & DC-8 and more capacity of air routine allowance from ICAO, airline ticket prices reduced drastically. In 1980, Cathay Pacific, to obtain the freedom of air from London to Hong Kong, broke British Airways' monopoly, lowered the price to HKD 1000 as a quarter of original gave rise to traveling by plane.

== See also ==
- Sha Tin Airfield
- Royal Hong Kong Auxiliary Air Force
- List of airports in Hong Kong
