= Typhoon Wanda (1962) =

Pacific typhoon in 1962

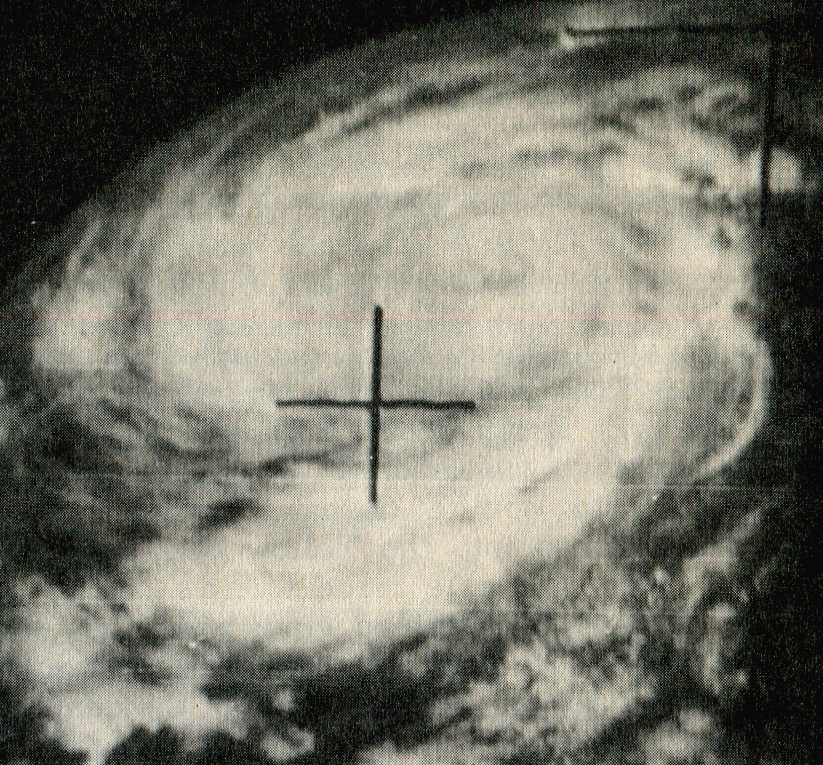
- TIROS weather satellite image of Typhoon Wanda taken on August 30, 1962 at 00:23 UTC

Meteorological history
- Formed: August 27, 1962
- Dissipated: September 1, 1962

Typhoon
- 10-minute sustained (JMA)
- Lowest pressure: 960 hPa (mbar); 28.35 inHg

Category 2-equivalent typhoon
- 1-minute sustained (SSHWS/JTWC)
- Highest winds: 175 km/h (110 mph)
- Lowest pressure: 949 hPa (mbar); 28.02 inHg

Overall effects
- Fatalities: 434
- Areas affected: British Hong Kong, Portuguese Macau and China
- IBTrACS
- Part of the 1962 Pacific typhoon season

Typhoon Wanda was one of the most intense tropical cyclones on record in Hong Kong. It was the 59th disturbance in the record-breaking 1962 Pacific typhoon season, forming in August east of the Philippines. Typhoon Wanda reached peak winds of 175 km/h (110 mph) in the South China Sea, and it made landfall on Hong Kong on September 1, producing gusts of 261 km/h (161 mph) which, in combination with a high storm surge, damaged thousands of huts and left 72,000 people homeless. Wanda left a total of 434 deaths, and it is estimated that an identical typhoon striking today would cause HK$2.6 billion ($335 million USD) in losses.

== Meteorological history ==
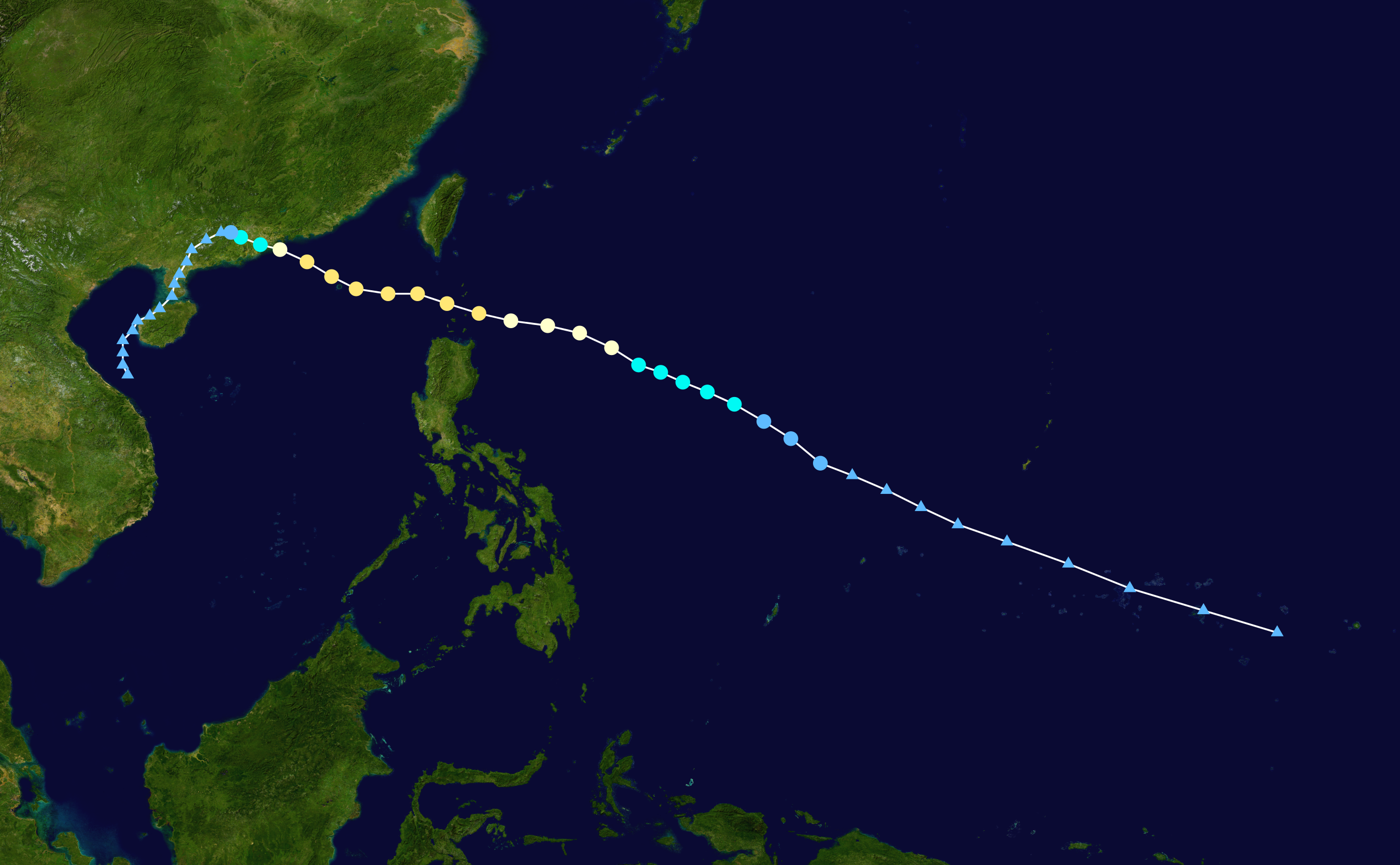
Map plotting the storm's track and intensity, according to the Saffir–Simpson scale Map key Saffir–Simpson scale Tropical depression (≤38 mph, ≤62 km/h) Tropical storm (39–73 mph, 63–118 km/h) Category 1 (74–95 mph, 119–153 km/h) Category 2 (96–110 mph, 154–177 km/h) Category 3 (111–129 mph, 178–208 km/h) Category 4 (130–156 mph, 209–251 km/h) Category 5 (≥157 mph, ≥252 km/h) Unknown Storm type Tropical cyclone Subtropical cyclone Extratropical cyclone, remnant low, tropical disturbance, or monsoon depression

The precursor disturbance to Typhoon Wanda was first observed on August 23 near Pohnpei in the Federated States of Micronesia. That day, a circulation formed in the interaction between the Mid-Pacific trough and an easterly wave, with energy from a surge in the Easterlies in the Southern Hemisphere. Initially winds were very weak, and it tracked west-northwestward while slowly gaining intensity. The official track from the Japan Meteorological Agency (JMA) indicated the system first developed into a tropical cyclone on August 25, whereas the Joint Typhoon Warning Center (JTWC) initiated advisories two days later, after it was observed by the Hurricane Hunters. It was designated Tropical Depression 59 while located about 1,120 km (700 mi) northeast of the Philippines.

Throughout most of its duration, the cyclone maintained a general west-northwest track, although initial forecasts had a northward bias that anticipated a track into Taiwan. On August 28, reconnaissance aircraft reported winds of 75 km/h (45 mph), or tropical storm status; as such, the JTWC named the system Wanda. Throughout the day, Wanda quickly intensified, with the pressure dropping to 992 mbar and the winds reaching 110 km/h (70 mph) by the end of the day. The next day, Wanda attained typhoon status, and on August 30 it traversed the Luzon Strait between the Philippines and Taiwan. By that time, the typhoon was about 1,600 km (1,000 mi) wide, and the next day rainbands began affecting southeastern China and Hong Kong.

While approaching southeastern China, Wanda reached its peak strength of 175 km/h (110 mph) in 1-minute winds, with the JTWC estimating a minimum pressure of 949 mbar. The typhoon weakened slightly before making landfall on Hong Kong at 0000 UTC on September 1, with winds of 150 km/h (90 mph). A combination of cold air and land interaction caused Wanda to weaken rapidly, and the JTWC discontinued advisories about 18 hours after Wanda moved ashore. According to the JMA track, the system turned southwest into the Gulf of Tonkin, intensifying slightly before shifting southeastward and dissipating over Hainan on September 4.

Typhoon Wanda was fairly well forecasted, compared to other storms during the year. The average forecast error for 24 hours was about 260 km (160 mi), whereas for 48 hours, it was 415 km (255 mi); both values were less than the seasonal average.

== Impact ==
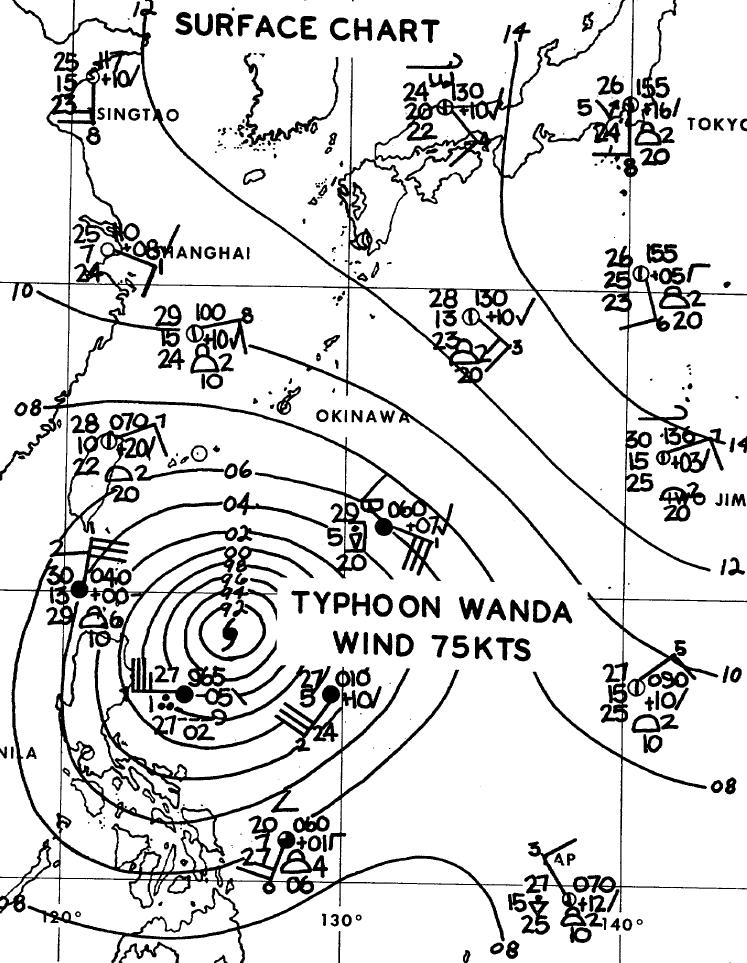
Surface weather analysis of Typhoon Wanda northeast of Philippines

During its passage of Hong Kong, Wanda produced 263 mm (10.4 in) of rainfall. The typhoon moved ashore during the daily high tide, resulting in a storm surge of at least 5 m (17 feet) above normal, especially around Tolo Harbour, which caused widespread flooding and damaged or destroyed thousands of huts and houses in Sha Tin and Tai Po. The strong winds and waves blew fishing vessels from the water onto the streets. Storm surge also destroyed Sha Tin Airfield. Maximum sustained winds were 145 km/h (90 mph 10-minute sustained), while gusts reached 260 km/h (161 mph), stronger than any previous typhoon on record. Additionally, the lowest pressure during its passage was 953.2 mbar, which was the lowest on record at the RHKO.

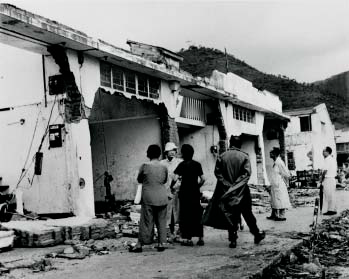
Damage by Wanda

Overall, the typhoon caused 434 deaths and left 72,000 people homeless. There was never a finalized damage total, although it was estimated in the millions of dollars. Over 2,000 boats in the colony were either wrecked or damaged. As damage was so severe in Hong Kong, there were little reports of impact elsewhere, although the storm did move across portions of southern China.

Typhoon Wanda routed in Hong Kong near Cheung Chau, to the right side of most parts of Hong Kong, so the strong wind blowing into Tolo Harbour made the sea level rise, therefore Sha Tin (area near Tolo Harbour) became the hardest hit. Since a large number of people settled in squatter huts on low-lying coastal areas or precarious slopes and fishermen lived in fishing boats, it caused large casualties when the typhoon hit Hong Kong. Some survivors claim that the huge waves covered up their homes, sweeping the squatter huts and dumping homes in front of them. They had to run to the railway station in a higher sea level, but the flood was also deep in the knees. It is estimated that one in five squatter huts was destroyed or damaged by the typhoon in Sha Tin, one of the gathering place of squatter huts in Hong Kong at that time. Approximately 3,000 squatter huts were damaged in total. The roads were blocked by a large number of damaged squatter huts and the British army was needed to help rescue the residents and clean up the road. The heavy flooding increased the difficulty of the rescue and clean up. Eight hundred and sixty-nine acres of farm land were flooded with sea water, over 30 percent (277 acres) were in Sha Tin, and almost 65 percent (179 acres) of the low-lying farm in Sha Tin were still affected two months later. Shops and stores were also heavily damaged by the flood, many goods from stores were drifting on the street and it was difficult for them to reopen in the short term.

== See also ==
- Other tropical cyclones of the same name
