= October 2021 nor'easter =

Atlantic nor'easter and tropical storm

October 2021 nor'easter / Tropical Storm Wanda
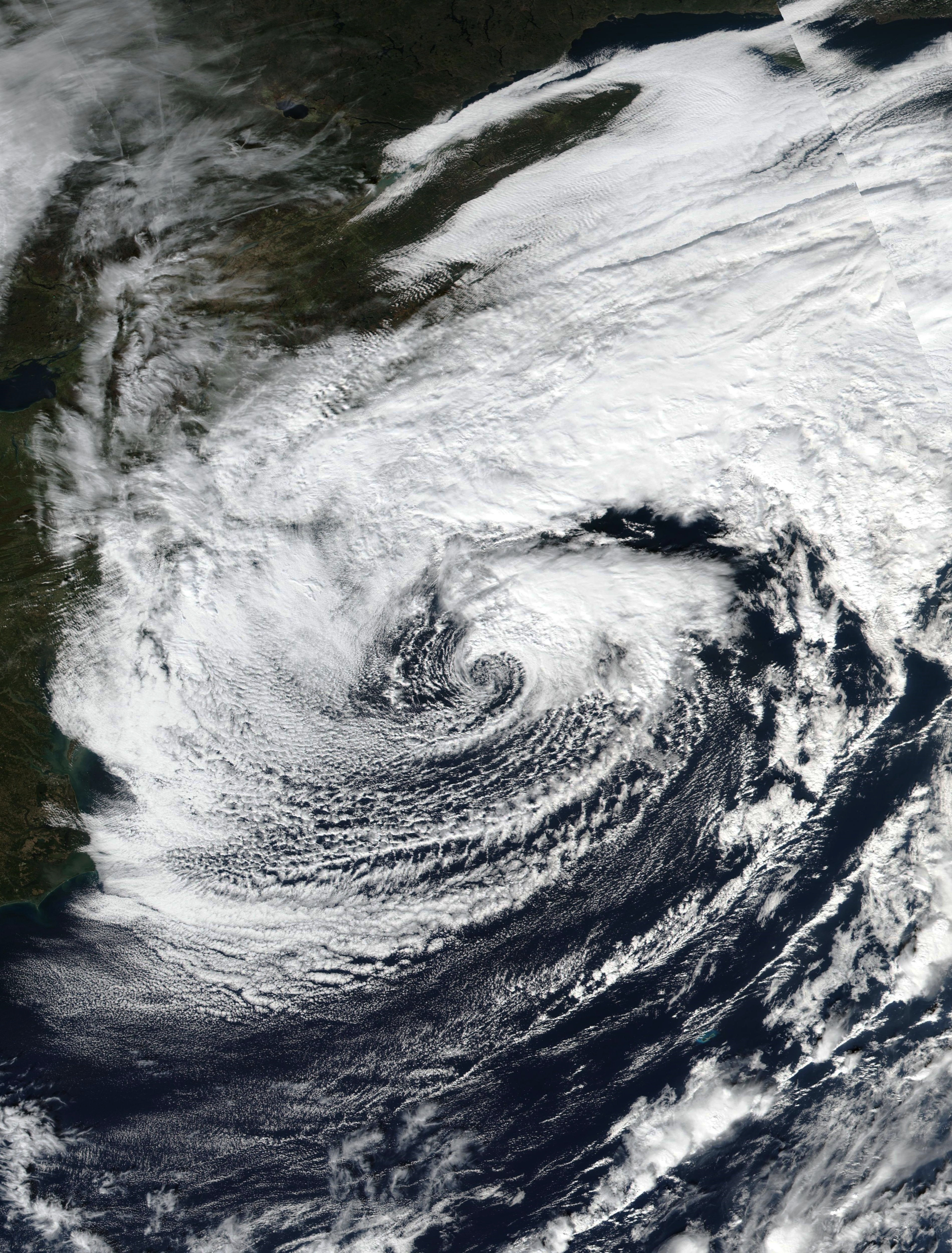
- The nor'easter near peak intensity off the coast of the Northeastern United States, on October 27

Meteorological history
- as the October 2021 nor'easter
- Formed: October 25, 2021

Meteorological history
- as Tropical Storm Wanda
- Formed: October 30, 2021
- Post-tropical: November 7, 2021
- Dissipated: November 7, 2021

Nor'easter
- Highest winds: 70 mph (110 km/h)
- Highest gusts: 90 mph (150 km/h)
- Lowest pressure: 973 mbar (hPa); 28.73 inHg
- Max. rainfall: 8.69 in (220.7 mm) at Baiting Hollow, New York

Tropical storm
- 1-minute sustained (SSHWS/NWS)
- Highest winds: 60 mph (95 km/h)
- Lowest pressure: 983 mbar (hPa); 29.03 inHg

Overall effects
- Fatalities: ≥2
- Damage: >$200 million (2021 USD)
- Areas affected: Southern United States, East Coast of the United States, Bermuda, Atlantic Canada, Azores
- Power outages: >600,000
- IBTrACS /
- Part of the 2021–22 North American winter and the 2021 Atlantic hurricane season

The October 2021 nor'easter, which eventually became Tropical Storm Wanda, was an erratic nor'easter and tropical cyclone that struck the East Coast of the United States, and meandered across the northern Atlantic Ocean in early November 2021. The powerful extratropical cyclone affected much of the East Coast, causing significant flooding in areas which were previously affected by hurricanes Henri and Ida. As Wanda, the cyclone was the twenty-first and final tropical cyclone of the 2021 Atlantic hurricane season. The system originated from a non-tropical mid-level trough that moved across the Southern United States on October 24–25, and moved out into the Atlantic, where a well defined area of low pressure formed. This quickly became a bomb cyclone off the East Coast of the United States on October 27, causing flooding and bringing powerful gale-force winds to the region in the process. Then, on October 30, after weakening and moving eastward out into the Atlantic, the system acquired subtropical characteristics and was given the name Wanda. By 12:00 UTC on November 1, the system transitioned into a tropical storm. Over the next several days, Wanda meandering well west of the Azores, before curving southward and then accelerating northeastward, before degenerating into a post-tropical cyclone on November 7, several hours before merging with a frontal system.

The nor'easter caused over $200 million (2021 USD) in damage in the Northeastern United States, and two storm-related deaths were reported. More than 600,000 customers across the region were without electrical power at the height of the storm. There were no reports of deaths from Wanda.

== Meteorological history ==
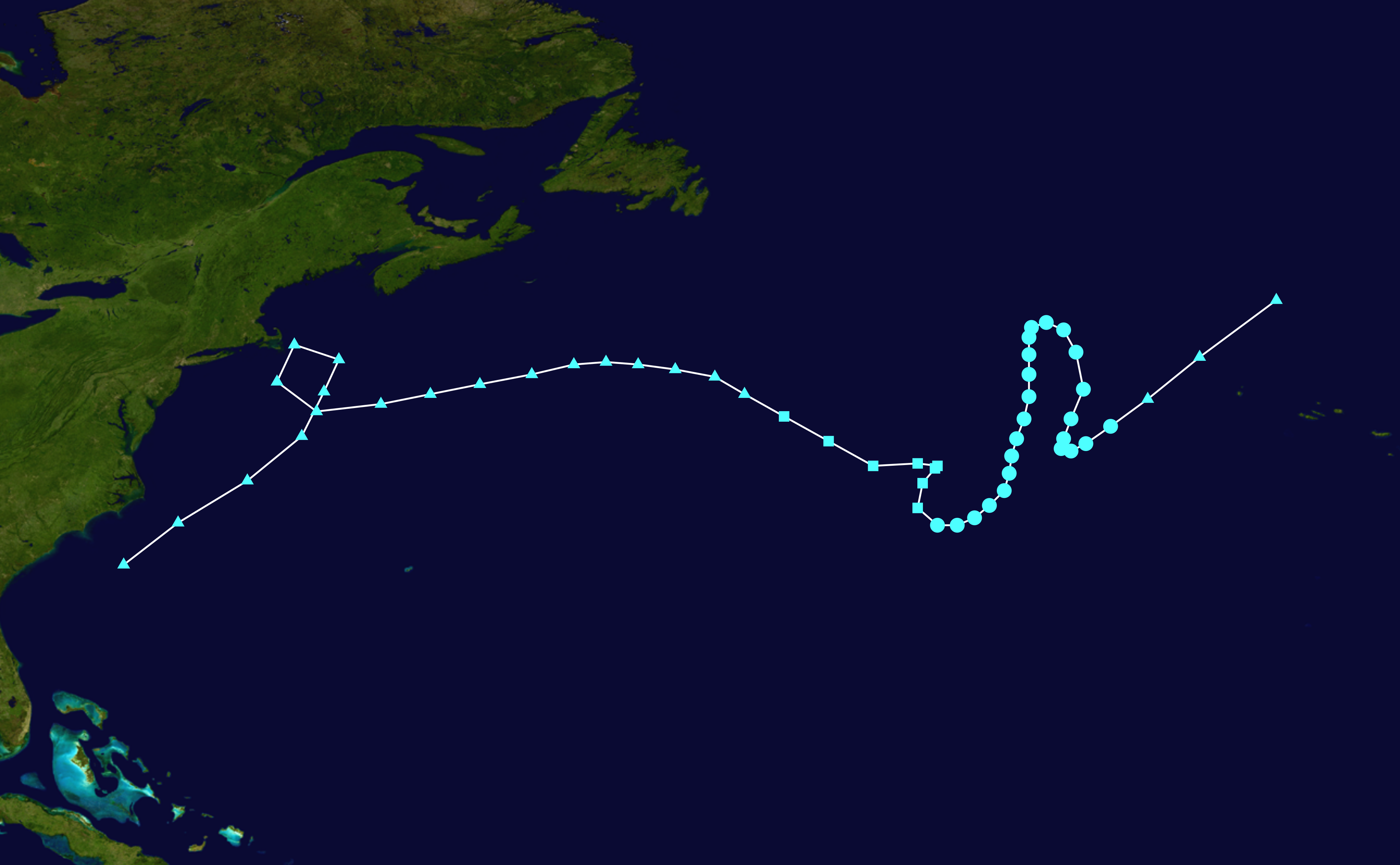
Map plotting the storm's track and intensity, according to the Saffir–Simpson scale Map key Saffir–Simpson scale Tropical depression (≤38 mph, ≤62 km/h) Tropical storm (39–73 mph, 63–118 km/h) Category 1 (74–95 mph, 119–153 km/h) Category 2 (96–110 mph, 154–177 km/h) Category 3 (111–129 mph, 178–208 km/h) Category 4 (130–156 mph, 209–251 km/h) Category 5 (≥157 mph, ≥252 km/h) Unknown Storm type Tropical cyclone Subtropical cyclone Extratropical cyclone, remnant low, tropical disturbance, or monsoon depression

On October 24‍–‍25, a non-tropical mid-level trough moved across the Southern United States and out into the Atlantic, where a well defined area of low pressure formed. The National Hurricane Center (NHC) began monitoring the disturbance on October 24, noting that it could potentially develop into a subtropical or tropical cyclone several days later. The extratropical low that produced the nor'easter (which later transitioned into Tropical Storm Wanda) formed on October 25, about 140 mi (220 km) southeast of Cape Fear, North Carolina, when the eastern part of the trough began interacting with the warm waters of the Gulf Stream. The following day, the low proceeded to move northeastward along the U.S. East Coast, ahead of another trough. There it deepened, and its structure improved, as it absorbed another extratropical low over the Northeastern United States, which was located to the west. The nor'easter became a bomb cyclone on October 26‍–‍27, when its central barometric pressure dropped from 996 mbar (29.41 inHg) to 973 mbar (28.73 inHg) over a 24 hour period. During this time, at 00:00 UTC on October 27, the system also reached its peak strength with sustained winds of 70 mph (110 km/h), while located about 125 mi (205 km) east-southeast of Nantucket, Massachusetts.

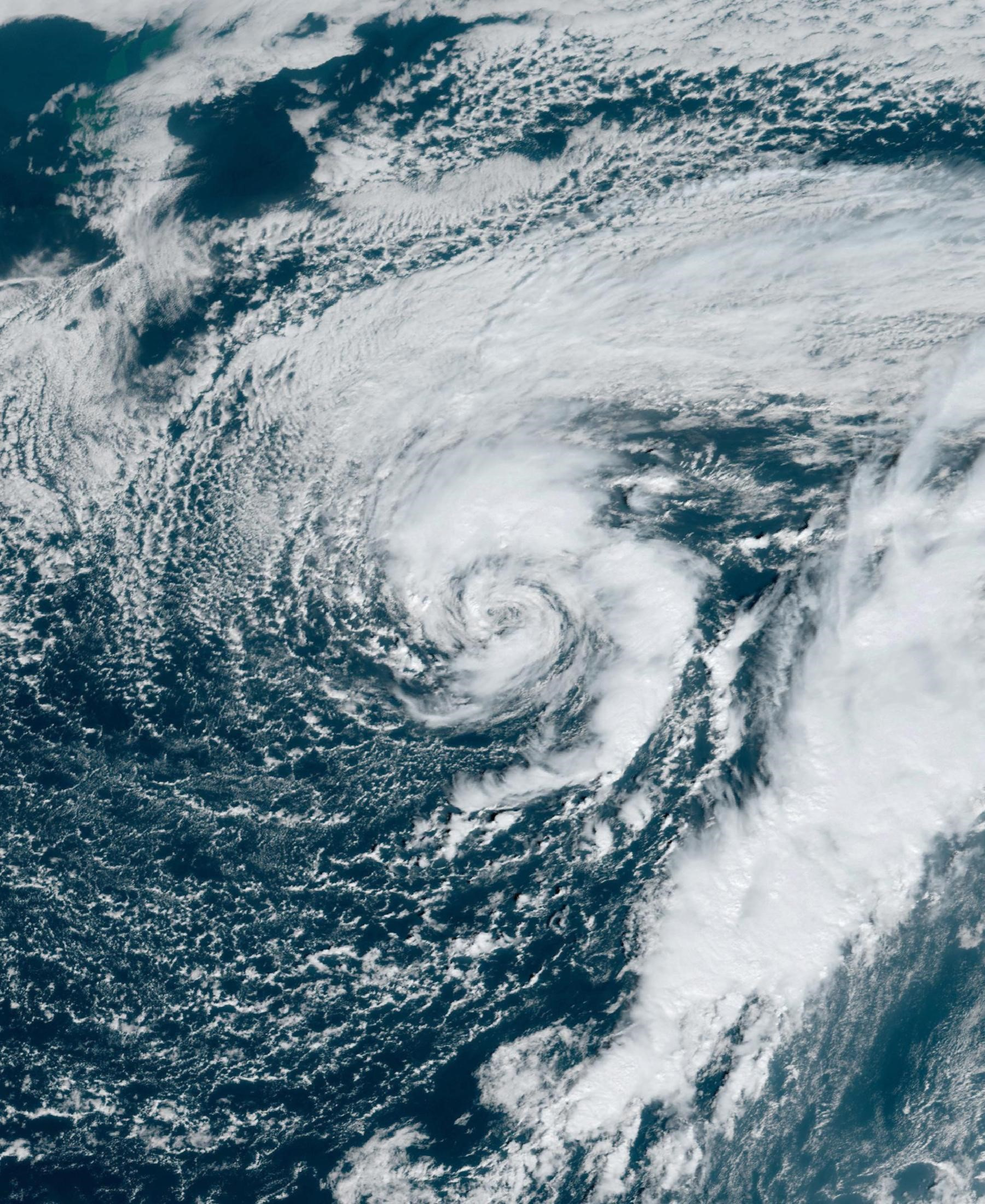
Subtropical Storm Wanda over the North Atlantic on October 31

The nor'easter was making a counterclockwise loop while rapidly intensifying, and when completed, it gradually weakened while moving out to sea. Embedded within a trough as it began moving eastward late on October 27, the NHC rated the five-day probability of it becoming subtropical as low (less than 40%). Late on October 29, the system began acquiring subtropical characteristics, following a flare-up of convection in its northern region. Then, at 12:00 UTC on October 30, Subtropical Storm Wanda formed about 595 mi (955 km) south-southeast of Cape Race, Newfoundland. That same day, Wanda's generally eastward movement came to an abrupt stop, and the shear decreased, which provided an opportunity for it to gain strength. Consequently, it was able to reach its peak intensity with maximum sustained winds of 60 mph (95 km/h) and a minimum central pressure of 983 mbar (29.03 inHg) at 12:00 UTC on October 31.

Though Wanda moved over slightly warmer waters on November 1, it was weakened somewhat due to renewed shear and entrainment of dry air. Nonetheless, the system transitioned into a fully-tropical storm at 12:00 UTC that day, about 950 mi (1,530 km) west-southwest of the Azores. After turning east, then northeast early on November 2, the storm produced a large burst of convection. Several hours later, however, Wanda entrained more dry air, which degraded the convection. On the next day, now following a northerly track, Wanda generated another burst of convection. This brought the storm over cooler 68–70 °F (20–21 °C) waters, where its sustained winds fluctuated between 45 and 50 mph (75 and 85 km/h) into November 4. Even so, Wanda was able to maintain some convection around its center during this time. Wanda turned southward on November 5, due to a narrow, strengthening ridge to the northwest.

Late on November 6, Wanda began accelerating northeastward, as it began interacting with a larger extratropical cyclone approaching from the west over the northern Atlantic. The resulting wind shear stripped away Wanda's remaining convection, and it became a post-tropical cyclone by 12:00 UTC on November 7, while located about 430 mi (695 km) west-northwest of the Azores. Several hours later, the cyclone merged with an approaching frontal system and dissipated.

== Preparations ==
=== Northeastern United States ===
More than 100 schools closed in Cape Cod, Massachusetts in advance of the nor'easter. The Governors of New Jersey and New York declared states of emergency, with the National Weather Service issuing flash flood watches and flash flood warnings across the Northeastern United States. New York City Mayor Bill de Blasio had storm drains cleared and sandbags deployed. Multiple school districts closed across New Jersey, in anticipation of the flooding. Phil Murphy, the Governor of New Jersey, declared a state of emergency for the storm early on October 25. As a precaution, schools were shuttered, and flash flood warnings were issued across the state.

== Impact ==
According to Aon Benfield, damage from the nor'easter was estimated at over $200 million across the Northeastern United States. Additionally, two storm-related deaths were reported. At the height of the storm, over 600,000 customers lost power in the Northeastern United States.

=== New Jersey ===
New Jersey recorded a rainfall amount of 5 inches (130 mm) by 15:00 UTC on October 27. Many places around the state experienced flash floods as a result of the rain, while the Saddle River overflowed its banks, generating six to seven feet (1.83 to 2.13 meters) of water near the basin. The southbound lanes of New Jersey Route 17 closed as a result. In Union Beach, more than a dozen water rescues were executed after vehicles were trapped by floodwaters. Trees were also felled by strong winds across the area, with one instance in Morris County killing a woman and wounding another. A tree also fell on a house, causing minor damage.

=== Massachusetts ===
Over 500,000 customers lost electricity in Massachusetts, due to the nor'easter. A peak wind gust of 113 mph (182 km/h) was recorded in Truro, along with 103 mph (166 km/h) in Duxbury, and 97 mph (156 km/h) in Wellfleet. Martha's Vineyard, Massachusetts reported a wind gust to 94 mph (151 km/h) and Scituate reported a gust of 87 mph (140 km/h). Unofficial wind gusts of 110 mph in Wellfleet and 107 mph in Provincetown were recorded at exposed coastal locations. The system also brought heavy rainfall to the state, causing flooding. Its subsequent wind gusts felled trees, blocking several roadways and causing the widespread power outage. Small boats were also washed ashore by the storm, and the nor'easter brought strong seas to the state. Some homes were also damaged as trees fell on them. A plane was damaged at the New Bedford Regional Airport after being blown off the runway. In Hingham, a large tree brought down wires. Brockton also received over 300 calls for help, along with its mayor declaring a state of emergency starting on October 27. Shelters were also opened to accommodate potential evacuees. Ferry services were affected, with very restricted operations permitted.

=== New York ===
In New York State, the body of a missing kayaker was found, after he tried to cross Long Island Sound ahead of the nor'easter. A flash flood emergency was issued for the Finger Lakes region of New York. Delaware, Otsego, and Sullivan counties experienced flooding. Peak winds of 52 mph (84 km/h) and 60 mph (97 km/h) were recorded in New York State and Connecticut, respectively. The storm dropped a maximum total of 8.69 in (221 mm) of rain in Baiting Hollow, New York. Other daily rainfall records were set in Islip, New York at 4.47 inches (114 mm), JFK Airport at 3.24 inches (82 mm), and Bridgeport, Connecticut at 2.87 inches (73 mm). Portions of the Bronx River Parkway closed due to the flooding, and the Staten Island Railway was suspended for 3 hours between Huguenot and Tottenville.

=== Elsewhere ===
In Rhode Island, the storm cut the power to 92,000 customers. In Maine, over 25,000 customers experienced power outages.

== See also ==
- Weather of 2021
- Tropical cyclones in 2021
- List of storms named Wanda
- Timeline of the 2021 Atlantic hurricane season
- 1991 Perfect Storm – another nor'easter that became a tropical cyclone
- October 2017 North American storm complex
- Tropical Storm Melissa (2019) – affected the same areas and transitioned from a subtropical to a tropical storm off the East Coast of the U.S.
