= RAF Kai Tak =

Former Royal Air Force station in Hong Kong

RAF Kai Tak ~~HMS Flycatcher~~ ~~HMS Nabcatcher~~
- at Kai Tak Airport, on the Kowloon Peninsula in Hong Kong
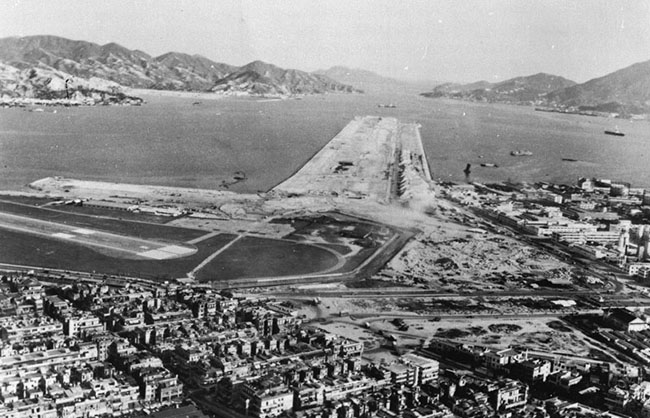
- Kai Tak Airport with runway 13/31 extension project, 1950s

- Station badge

Site information
- Type: Royal Air Force station
- Owner: British Hong Kong
- Operator: Royal Air Force (1927–1941, 1945–1978); Royal Navy (1939–1941, 1945–1947)
- Controlled by: Far East Air Force (1945–1971); Fleet Air Arm (1939–1941, 1945–1947)

Location
- Location of RAF Kai Tak within Hong Kong RAF Kai Tak (China)
- Coordinates: 22°19′43″N 114°11′39″E

Site history
- In use: 1927–1941, 1945–1978 (Royal Air Force); 1939–1941, 1945–1948 (Fleet Air Arm) (Lodger facilities 1948–1978)
- Battles/wars: Second World War; Pacific War

Airfield information
- Identifiers: IATA: ~~HKG~~, ICAO: ~~VHHH/VHKT~~
- Elevation: 10 feet (3.0 m) AMSL
Runways
Direction	Length and surface
07/25	1,585 yards (1,449 m) x 70 yards (64 m) concrete
12/30	1,525 yards (1,394 m) x 110 yards (101 m) concrete
13/31	2,800 yards (2,560 m) Asphalt
- Source: Royal Navy Research Archive

RAF Kai Tak is a former Royal Air Force (RAF) station situated in Hong Kong, at Kai Tak Airport, Kowloon. It was established in 1927 and originally used for seaplanes; the station later hosted a few land-based aircraft and spare aircraft for naval units.

It was also the location of HMS Nabcatcher, a Royal Navy Mobile Operational Naval Air Base which was there between 1945 and 1947. At the start of April 1947, it was decommissioned and concurrently re-commissioned as HMS Flycatcher. At the end of December, HMS Flycatcher was officially decommissioned at Kai Tak, although the Royal Navy retained lodger rights.

RAF Kai Tak was officially decommissioned on 30 June 1978, after which all RAF units and responsibilities were transferred to RAF Sek Kong.

== Royal Navy ==
=== Beginnings (1939–1941) ===
On 24 May 1939, the control of all Fleet Air Arm squadrons and flights was transferred to the Admiralty, while the Royal Air Force (RAF) granted lodger rights at Kai Tak. No. 715 Catapult Flight, which had been established at RAF Kai Tak in 1936, was by this point engaged in operations with Supermarine Walrus amphibious maritime patrol aircraft on Royal Navy cruisers, using Kai Tak as its shore base. 715 Naval Air Squadron represented the sole Royal Navy presence at the station at the onset of the Second World War in September 1939. On 21 January 1940, this squadron was integrated into 700 Naval Air Squadron, which assumed responsibility for all catapult aircraft operations.

On 8 December 1941, the Imperial Japanese Army began Battle of Hong Kong soon after the attack on Pearl Harbor. The colony resisted for two weeks before surrendering on 25 December 1941.

=== HMS Nabcatcher (1945–1947) ===
HMS Nabcacther (Motto: E Pluribus Unum (Latin for 'Out of Many, One')

HMS Nabcatcher was a Royal Navy (RN), Mobile Operational Naval Air Base (MONAB) at Kai Tak airfield. HMS Nabcatcher was also known as MONAB VIIII and Royal Naval Air Station Kai Tak (or RNAS Kai Tak).

On 26 September, MONAB VIII was established at Kai Tak airfield as RNAS Kai Tak, HMS Nabcatcher. This unit was designed to operate in a manner akin to those in Australia, providing shore facilities for disembarked squadrons and ultimately overseeing a Fleet Requirements Unit (FRU). Concurrently, the Royal Air Force began its operations at this site. It was decided that the station would be used collaboratively, comprising two camp and maintenance areas. The airfield was partitioned, with the RAF occupying the eastern section, which contained pre-war airfield infrastructure, while the Royal Navy used the western, undeveloped area for the deployment of MONAB equipment. It was established that the RAF would retain sole authority over Air Traffic Control.

Personnel and equipment for Mobile Naval Air Base VIII had assembled in May 1945, at RNAS Middle Wallop (HMS Flycatcher) in Hampshire. This mobile air base was called a Fighter Support MONAB and its technical components were Mobile Maintenance (MM) No. 7, Mobile Servicing (MS) Nos. 13 and 14, with Mobile, Storage, and Reserve (MSR) No. 9, which provided support for Seafire, Corsair, and Firefly fighters.

MONAB VIII was commissioned as HMS Nabcatcher on 1 July 1945, with Captain V. N. Surtees, DSO, RN, serving as the commanding officer. That month personnel boarded SS Majola, which departed for Sydney, Australia. The stores, equipment, and vehicles were loaded onto the SS Empire Chieftain, which departed on 7 July. The announcement of the Surrender of Japan was while at sea, leading to the celebration of V-J Day during the voyage. With the conclusion of the war, MONAB VIII was deemed unnecessary for operations in Australia. The MONAB was scheduled for transfer to Hong Kong, where it would be established at Kai Tak airport to assist in the reopening of the airfield and to offer shore-based support to the British Pacific Fleet units stationed in the region.

The advance contingent of MONAB VIII was transported aboard the escort carrier HMS Slinger, which set sail from Australia for Hong Kong on 5 September. The SS Empire Chieftain reached Sydney two days prior, on 3 September and departed for Hong Kong on 15 September. Mobile, Storage, and Reserve (MSR) No. 9 embarked on the escort carrier HMS Reaper for its journey to Hong Kong, which commenced on 28 September. 1701 Naval Air Squadron headquarters was established at HMS Nabcatcher on 1 November 1945 and 721 Naval Air Squadron, a Fleet Requirements Unit arrived on 11 January 1946 on the escort carrier HMS Speaker.

In August 1946, there was a reduction in the naval presence at the station, 1701 Naval Air Squadron disbanding on 27 August, with its Sea Otter aircraft transferred to 721 Naval Air Squadron, the FRU. The same day MONAB VIII was no longer recognised as an independent command, being downgraded to the status of RN Air Section Kai Tak. The ships account for Nabcatcher was maintained at HMS Tamar, the Royal Naval base in Hong Kong.

At the beginning of October, the aircraft carrier HMS Glory docked in Hong Kong, where it disembarked its squadrons, 806 Naval Air Squadron with Seafire F Mk XV fighters and 837 Naval Air Squadron flying Firefly FR.I fighter reconnaissance aircraft. The squadrons re-embarked at the beginning of November, with 837 Naval Air Squadron returning to the ship on 4 November followed by 806 Naval Air Squadron two days later.

On 8 November 1946, command of HMS Nabcatcher was transferred to Commander (A) W. H. N. Martin, RN, who also assumed the role of Fleet Aviation Officer (FAO) for the British Pacific Fleet. On 27 November, more Seafire F Mk XV fighter aircraft arrived at the station when 802 Naval Air Squadron disembarked from HMS Venerable and they were joined by 806 Naval Air Squadron from HMS Glory on 19 December.

During the Nabcatcher period, the RAF ran the Air Headquarters Hong Kong Communication Squadron from Kai Tak, which was active from 12 September 1945 – 15 January 1947, flying Bristol Beaufighter Mk. Xs, and Harvard IIbs.

=== HMS Flycatcher (1947) ===
The two Seafire squadrons remained at RNAS Kai Tak until 12 February 1947, then rejoined their aircraft carriers. HMS Nabcatcher resumed its primary function of conducting FRU flights until 1 April, when a further administrative shift took place. Nabcatcher was decommissioned and the Air Section was re-commissioned as HMS Flycatcher, a name associated with the two MONAB formation stations in the United Kingdom, while accounts continued to be managed by HMS Tamar.

The RN Air Section at Kai Tak marked the conclusion of its operations with the arrival of its final disembarked squadron on 20 October 1947. On this date, Seafire F Mk XV fighters from 804 Naval Air Squadron flew ashore from the aircraft carrier HMS Theseus, subsequently re-embarking on 4 November. A decision had been made to terminate the operations of the RN Air Section; the Fleet Requirements Unit was officially disbanded on 31 December and HMS Flycatcher was decommissioned on 31 December. Following these events, the facilities of the RN Air Section at Kai Tak were downgraded to a 'care and maintenance', with an 18-month notice period established for potential reopening but this was never pursued, although the rights to disembark Royal Navy squadrons at the airfield were preserved.

=== Commanding officers ===
List of commanding officers of HMS Nabcatcher / Flycatcher with date of appointment:

- Captain V. N. Surtees, DSO, RN, from 1 July 1945
- Commander(A) W. H. N. Martin, RN, from 9 November 1946

=== Units based at HMS Nabcatcher ===
List of units associated with MONAB VIII, in support of disembarked fighter squadrons:

Function

- Support for disembarked fighter squadrons, an air-sea rescue squadron and a Fleet Requirements Unit

Aviation support components

- Mobile Maintenance (MM) No. 7
- Mobile Servicing (MS) No. 13
- Mobile Servicing (MS) No. 14
- Mobile, Storage & Reserve (MSR) No. 9

Aircraft type supported

- Grumman Avenger Mk.I & II
- Fairey Barracuda Mk II
- Vought Corsair Mk II & IV
- Fairey Firefly I
- Grumman Hellcat F. Mk. I & II
- Supermarine Seafire F Mk III, L Mk III & F Mk XV

=== Lodger facilities (1948–1978) ===
The initial deployment of a Royal Navy squadron ashore following the transfer of the airfield to the Royal Air Force occurred during the Malayan Emergency. On 5 November 1949, 800 Naval Air Squadron, with Seafire FR Mk.47 fighters, disembarked from the Colossus class HMS Triumph and re-embarked on 3 December. The squadron returned on 13 March 1950, remaining on land for a duration of one month before re-embarking on 10 April.

Sea Venom FAW.22 jet fighters of 891 Naval Air Squadron disembarked from the Centaur-class aircraft carrier HMS Bulwark on 17 May 1958. The squadron remained deployed until 3 June before returning to the carrier. This deployment marked the sole occasion when Royal Navy jet aircraft used the historic runway 12/30. A new runway, 13/31, was inaugurated in September 1958, extending 2,800 yd (2,600 m) into Kowloon Bay on reclaimed land. This new runway was on the south-eastern side of the airfield, distinct from the other two runways.

In December 1958, two squadrons from the Centaur-class light fleet carrier HMS Albion deployed detachments to Kai Tak. On 12, three Whirlwind HAS.7 anti-submarine helicopters from 820 Naval Air Squadron were deployed, followed by five Sea Venom FAW.21 jet fighter aircraft from 809 Naval Air Squadron on 19 December. Both groups rejoined HMS Albion on 5 January 1959. HMS Albion returned in July 1960, during which a detachment of four Sea Venom FAW.22 jets from 894 Naval Air Squadron was disembarked for a week-long stay. Later that same year, several Whirlwind HAS.7 anti-submarine helicopters from 848 Naval Air Squadron were landed from HMS Bulwark on 9 November and they re-embarked on 21 November.

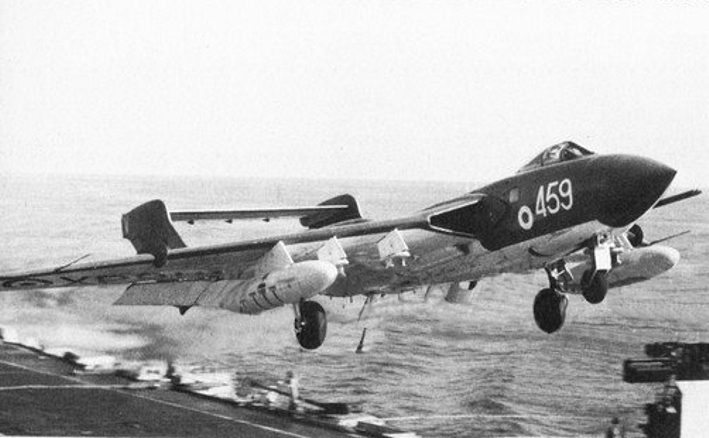
Sea Vixen FAW.1 from 893 Naval Air Squadron

On 23 October 1963, HMS Victorious disembarked a contingent consisting of four Buccaneer S.1 aircraft from 801 Naval Air Squadron and four Sea Vixen FAW.1 aircraft from 893 Naval Air Squadron for a brief period, with both units re-embarking on 7 November. On 22 December, HMS Albion landed a detachment of three Whirlwind HAS.7 anti-submarine helicopters from 846 Naval Air Squadron, which departed on 12 January 1964. In March of the same year, the Fairey Gannet AEW.3 aircraft from ‘B’ flight of 849 Naval Air Squadron were disembarked from the lead ship of her class HMS Centaur on the 28 and re-embarked on the 13 of the following month.

HMS Centaur returned to Hong Kong in September 1964, disembarking de Havilland Sea Vixen FAW.1 from 892 Naval Air Squadron on the 19, followed by, this time, the Fairey Gannet aircraft from ‘B’ flight of 849 Naval Air Squadron on the 25, both of which re-joined the carrier on 14 October.

849 Naval Air Squadron's 'D' flight returned to RAF Kai Tak on 23 February 1965, having flown its Fairey Gannet AEW.3 from RAF Seletar in Singapore in anticipation of the aircraft carrier HMS Eagle's arrival. The squadron embarked on the Audacious-class aircraft carrier on 11 March. Three years later, on 23 March 1968, the same flight disembarked from HMS Eagle for a short period, rejoining the vessel on 6 April.

The final Royal Navy helicopter squadron to operate from RAF Kai Tak was the Westland Wessex HU.5 troop transporter equipped 847 Naval Air Squadron, which arrived on 28 September 1970 after flying in from RNAS Sembawang (HMS Simbang), Singapore. They departed to return to RNAS Sembawang on 23 October, just under a month later. The last Royal Navy aircraft to utilise the landing rights at RAF Kai Tak were two Fairey Gannet AEW.3 airborne early warning (AEW) aircraft from 'D' flight of 849 Naval Air Squadron, which were put ashore from HMS Eagle on 14 October 1971 and re-embarked on 27.

The lodger facilities were discontinued after the formal closure of RAF Kai Tak on 30 June 1978.

== Royal Air Force ==
From 1968 to 1978 it was used by various RAF helicopter units, as well as the Royal Hong Kong Auxiliary Air Force.

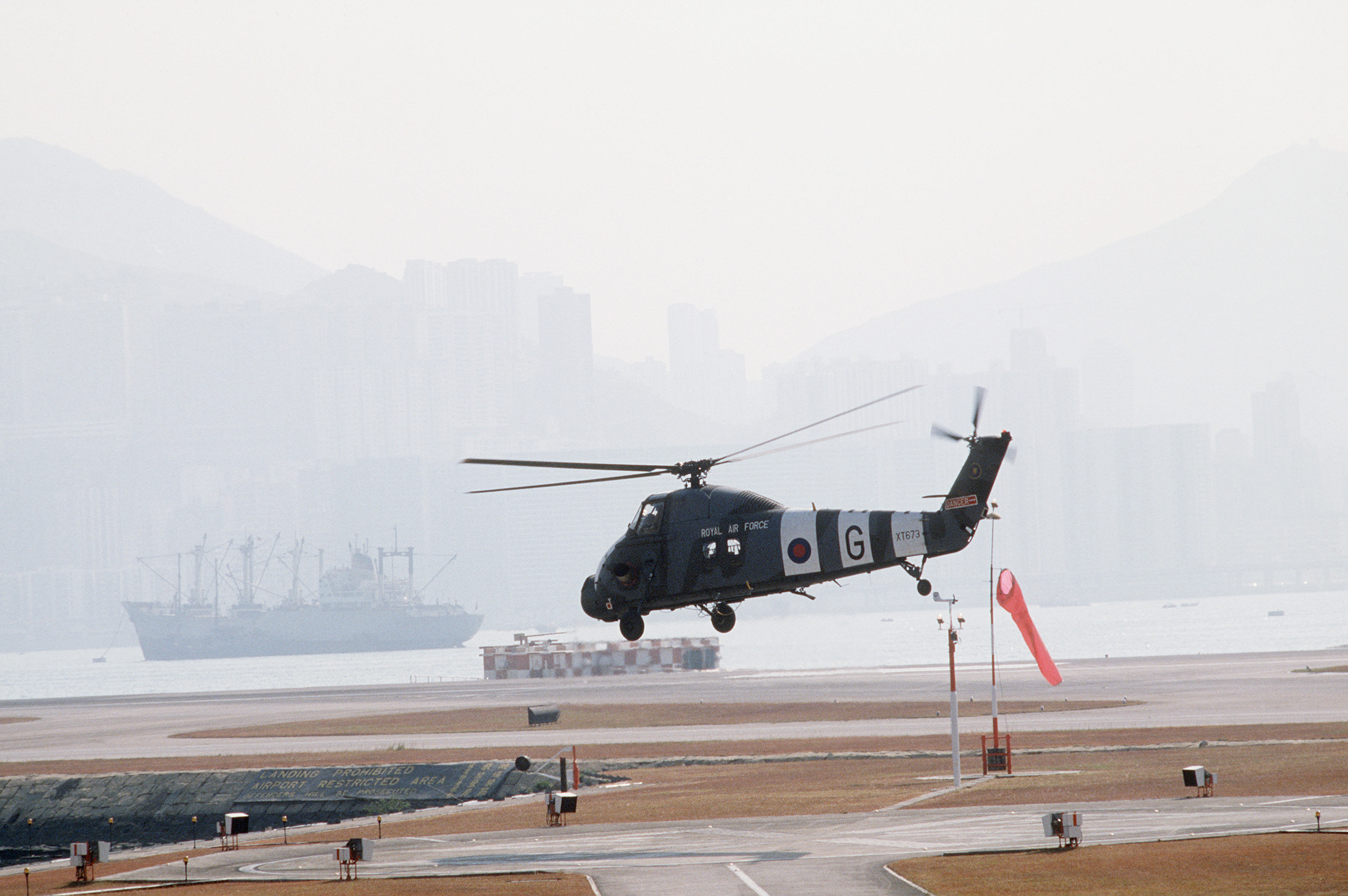
1983, a Westland Wessex HC.2 of No. 28 Squadron RAF, normally based at RAF Sek Kong, taking off from Kai Tak during "SAREX '83" – a search and rescue exercise.

Royal Air Force squadrons at Kai Tak

RAF units at Kai Tak included:

- No. 132 Squadron RAF (15 September 1945 – 15 April 1946) - Spitfire XIV
- No. 209 Squadron RAF (17 September 1945 – 28 April 1946) - Sunderland V
- No. 681 Squadron RAF (PRU) (27 September 1945 – 23 December 1945) - Spitfire XI/XIX
- No. 200 Staging Post RAF (14 November 1945 – January 1946)
- No. 1331 Wing RAF Regiment (xxx xxxx – May 1946)
- No. 96 Squadron RAF (16 April – 1 June 1946) - Dakota became No. 110 Squadron RAF (1 June 1946 – 15 September 1947) - Dakota
- Japan Force Communications Flight RAF (28 April – 1 June 1946) - Dakota IV
- No. 1430 (Flying Boat Transport) Flight RAF (5 August – 1 September 1946) - Sunderland became No. 88 Squadron RAF (1 September 1946 – 24 June 1951)
- No. 1903 Air Observation Post Flight RAF, No. 656 Squadron RAF (15 July 1948 – 17 August 1949)
- No. 28 Squadron RAF (11 May 1949 – 1 May 1950; 7 October 1950 – 28 March 1951; 15 August – 5 December 1955; 14 June 1957 – 2 January 1967; 1 March 1968 – 17 May 1978; Spitfire FR.18, Vampire FB.5 & 9, Venom FB.1 & 4, Hunter FGA.9, Whirlwind HC.10 & Wessex HC.2 1 November 1996 – 4 June 1997)
- No. 80 Squadron RAF (20 August 1949 – 3 January 1950; 1 February – 7 March 1950; 28 April 1950 – 1 May 1955) - Spitfire F.24, Hornet F.3

Royal Air Force detachments

- No. 215 Squadron RAF (October 1945 – February 1946) - Dakota
- No. 209 Squadron RAF April 1946 – January 1955) - Sunderland V
- No. 81 Squadron RAF (October 1947 – April 1958) - Spitfire PR.19/FR.18, Mosquito PR.34, Anson C.19, Meteor PR.10 & Pembroke C(PR).1
- No. 205 Squadron RAF (September 1949 – March 1958) - Sunderland GR.5
- No. 88 Squadron RAF (June 1951 – October 1954) - Sunderland GR.5
- No. 60 Squadron RAF (July 1961 – May 1968) - Javelin FAW.9
- No. 103 Squadron RAF (August 1963 – March 1969) - Whirlwind HC.10
- No. 45 Squadron RAF (June 1965 – February 1970) - Canberra B.15

== Royal Hong Kong Auxiliary Air Force ==
The civilian Royal Hong Kong Auxiliary Air Force was based at Kai Tak between 1 May 1949 and 1 April 1993, supported by the Royal Air Force. It comprised the Hong Kong Auxiliary Air Force Wing (which was previously the Hong Kong Auxiliary Squadron) between 24 November 1953 and December 1954 which controlled the Hong Kong (Fighter) Squadron, Hong Kong Fighter Control Unit and the Hong Kong Air Traffic Control Centre.

The Hong Kong Auxiliary Flight was formed on 15 September 1949 operating Spitfire F.24's and Auster AOP.6's, it was expanded into the Hong Kong Auxiliary Squadron on 1 October 1950, with the addition of Harvard IIb's. On 24 November 1953 the auxiliary squadron was split into the Hong Kong (Fighter) Squadron and the Hong Kong Auxiliary Air Force Wing. The new (Fighter) Squadron gained the Auster T.7 and was disbanded during December 1954.

The RAF left Kai Tak and moved most other operations to RAF Sek Kong on 30 June 1978. From 1993 the civilian Government Flying Service replaced the Royal Hong Kong Auxiliary Air Force at Kai Tak.

== Royal Navy squadrons at HMS Nabcatcher ==
A list of the Fleet Air Arm's aviation units that were either stationed at or deployed HMS Nabcatcher and MONAB VIII.

=== Based squadrons ===
- 721 Naval Air Squadron a Fleet Requirements Unit which disembarked from HMS Speaker on 11 January 1946 and was disbanded on 31 December 1947. The unit was equipped with a combination of Vultee Vengeance, Vought Corsair, Supermarine Seafire and de Havilland Tiger Moth aircraft. Subsequently, it took over the Supermarine Sea Otter aircraft from 1701 Naval Air Squadron.
- 1701 Naval Air Squadron was a Torpedo Bomber Reconnaissance Squadron performing Second Line duties. It had its headquarters flight established on 1 November 1945. 'A' Flight disembarked from HMS Striker on 16 November 1945, while 'B' Flight had disembarked from HMS Reaper on 13 October 1945. It was equipped with six Supermarine Sea Otter, one de Havilland Tiger Moth and one Airspeed Oxford. The squadron was disbanded on 27 August 1946.

=== Disembarked squadrons ===
==== Torpedo, bomber, and reconnaissance squadrons ====
- 814 Naval Air Squadron, a Torpedo, Bomber, and Reconnaissance Squadron, disembarked from HMS Venerable on 3 September 1945. The squadron re-embarked on 13 October, equipped with Fairey Barracuda Mk II aircraft. Subsequently, the squadron disembarked again from HMS Venerable on 27 November 27 1946 and re-embarked on 2 January 1947, this time equipped with Fairey Firefly FR.I. aircraft.
- 812 Naval Air Squadron, which was a Torpedo, Bomber, and Reconnaissance Squadron, disembarked from HMS Vengeance on 14 October 1945, and re-embarked on 20 December. The squadron was equipped with Fairey Barracuda Mk II aircraft.
- 827 Naval Air Squadron was a Torpedo, Bomber, and Reconnaissance Squadron. A detachment of six aircraft was deployed from HMS Colossus during the period of 15 October to 18 October 1945. This unit was equipped with Fairey Barracuda Mk I aircraft.
- 837 Naval Air Squadron, a Torpedo, Bomber, and Reconnaissance Squadron, disembarked from HMS Glory on 1 October 1946. The squadron re-embarked on 4 November and subsequently disembarked again from HMS Glory on 19 December 1946. They re-embarked on 14 February 1947 and was equipped with Fairey Firefly FR.I aircraft.

==== Fighter squadrons ====
- 802 Naval Air Squadron, a Single Seat Fighter Squadron, disembarked from HMS Venerable on 27 November 1946 and re-embarked on 12 February 1947. The squadron was equipped with Supermarine Seafire F.XV fighter aircraft.
- 806 Naval Air Squadron, a Single Seat Fighter Squadron, disembarked from HMS Glory on 1 October 1946 and re-embarked on 6 November 1946. The squadron disembarked again from HMS Glory on 19 December, before re-embarking on 14 February 1947. At that time, the squadron was equipped with Supermarine Seafire F Mk XV fighter aircraft.
- 1846 Naval Air Squadron deployed a detachment from HMS Colossus from 12 October to 18 October 1945. The Single Seat Fighter Squadron was equipped with Vought Corsair Mk IV aircraft.
- 1850 Naval Air Squadron was a Single Seat Fighter Squadron, which disembarked from HMS Vengeance on 3 October 1945 and re-embarked on 20 December, operating with Vought Corsair Mk IV aircraft.
- 1851 Naval Air Squadron was a Single Seat Fighter Squadron. A detachment of eight aircraft from HMS Venerable was re-embarked on 18 October 1945, after initially disembarking on 3 September. The squadron was equipped with Vought Corsair Mk IV aircraft.

== Royal Navy squadrons at HMS Flycatcher ==
A list of the Fleet Air Arm's aviation units that were either stationed at or deployed to HMS Flycatcher and the RN Air Section at RAF Kai Tak.

- 804 Naval Air Squadron, a Single Seat Fighter Squadron, disembarked from HMS Theseus on 20 October 1947 and re-embarked on 4 November. The squadron was equipped with Supermarine Seafire F.XV aircraft.

== Non-military users ==
It was the main airfield in Hong Kong housing other non-military users:

- Far East Flying Training School founded in the 1920s – later changed its name to Far East Flying and Technical School
- The Hong Kong Flying Club 1927
- Aero Club of Hong Kong 1962
- Offices of various airlines including:
  - Cathay Pacific
  - Hong Kong Aircraft Engineering Company (HAECO)
  - Hong Kong Polytechnic
  - Hong Kong Aviation Club
  - Heliservices (Hong Kong) Limited
  - Macau Aerial Transport Company
  - British Overseas Airways Corporation

== Facilities ==
Kai Tak runway

Kai Tak's first runway was a grass strip and the first tarmac, an east–west runway, was 457 metres long in 1939. A series of extensions were added over the years:

- 1940s – 1,371 metres runway added by the Japanese
- 1956 – 2,194 metres north–south runway added
- 1970 – 2,541 metres
- 1975 – 3,358 metres
- post 1975 – single asphalt runway 13/31 – 3,390 metres (or 11,122 feet)

Historic buildings

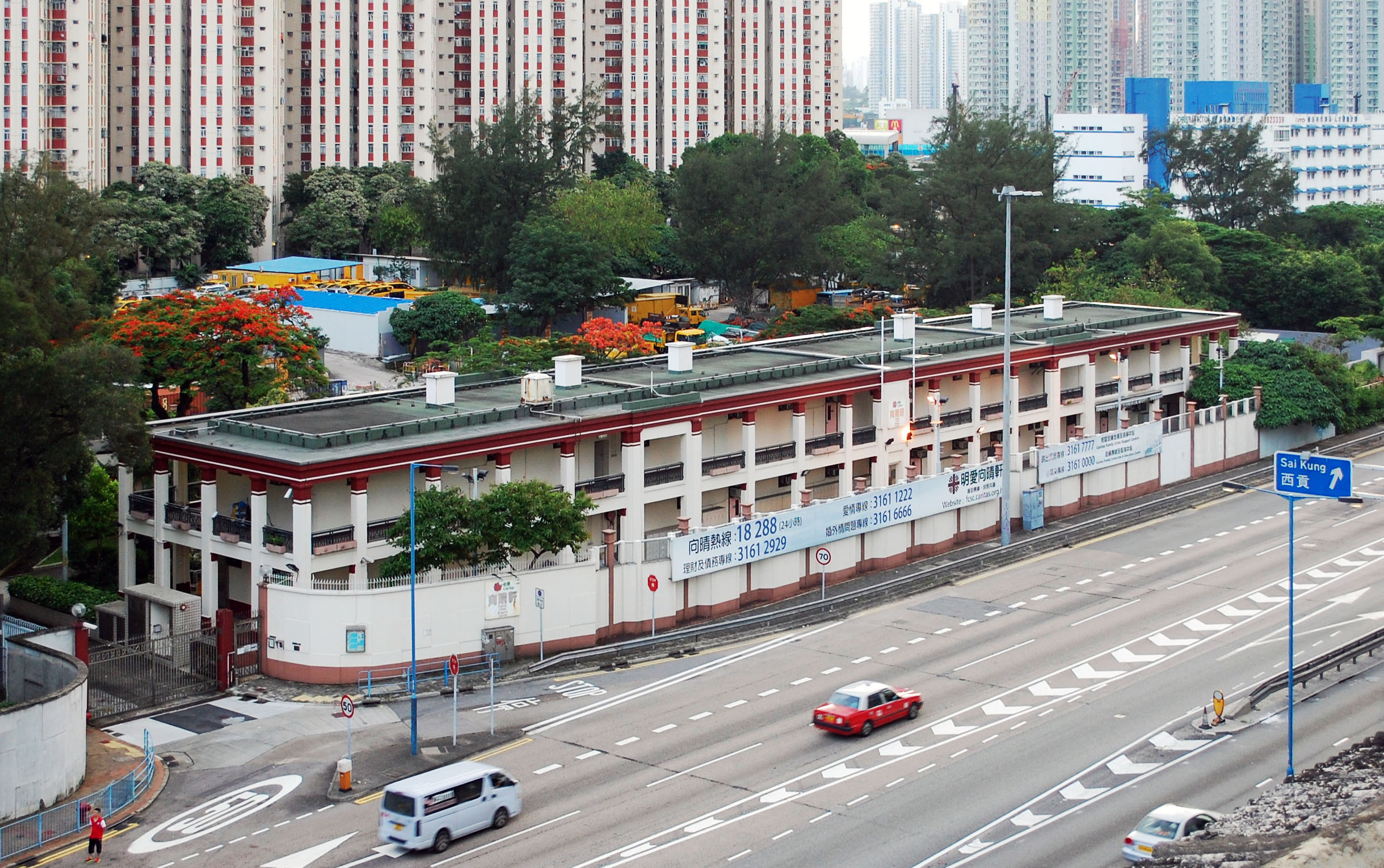
Former Headquarters Building, along Kwun Tong Road.

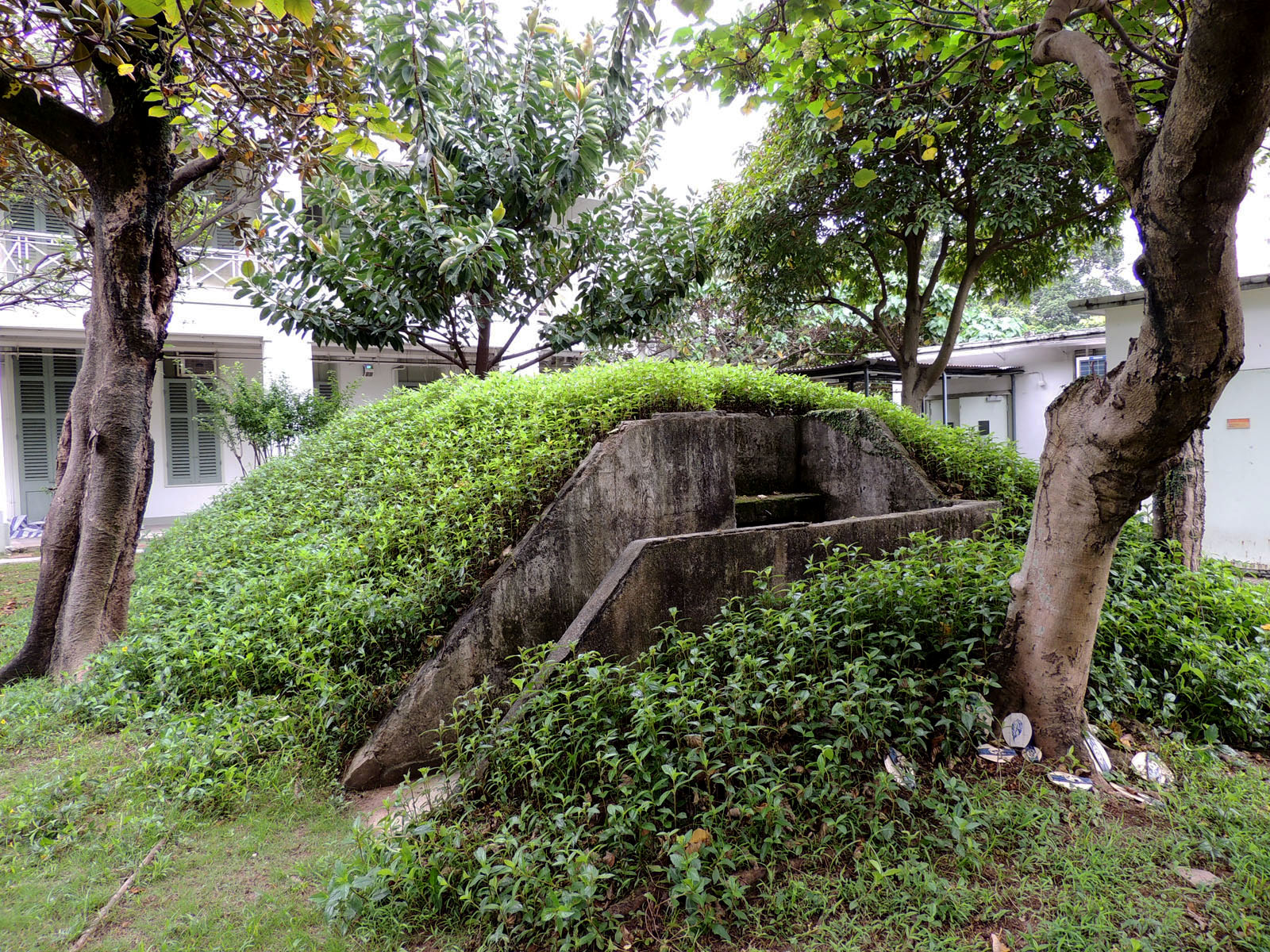
Air-raid shelter in the former Officers' Quarters Compound.

Several buildings of the former station remain. Three of them, built in 1934, are Grade I historic buildings: the Headquarters Building, the Officers Mess and an Annex Block.

- The former Headquarters Building is located at No. 50 Kwun Tong Road. It housed the Kai Tak Vietnamese Refugee Camp (啟德越南難民營) from 1979 to 1981, and was used for detaining Vietnamese refugees until 1997. It has been housing the Caritas Family Crisis Support Centre (明愛向晴軒) since 2002.
- The former Officers' Quarters Compound, which includes the RAF Officers' Mess and an Annex Block, is located at No. 51 Kwun Tong Road. It was handed over to the Government in 1978 and converted into a Detective Training School of the Hong Kong Police Force, and remained in use until 2001. It has later been refurbished as the new Kai Tak campus of Hong Kong Baptist University, housing its Academy of Visual Arts (視覺藝術院). Other remaining structures in the compound include a former barrack office, a squash court, an air-raid shelter, a dust bin store, a Nissen hut, a mini-range, a latrine block, basketball court and an incinerator. The restoration and adaptive reuse of the Officers' Mess received an Honourable Mention at the 2009 UNESCO Asia-Pacific Heritage Awards.
- The Gray Block (克拉克樓), located at No. 2 Kwun Tong Road, was built in 1973. It has been converted into the New Horizons Building (新秀大廈), used by Christian Action.
- Hangar for aircraft at Choi Hung Road used to store Supermarine Spitfires.

== See also ==
- List of airports in Hong Kong
- Sha Tin Airfield
- Shek Kong Airfield
- List of former Royal Air Force stations
- Hong Kong International Airport (located at Chek Lap Kok)
- Kai Tak Airport (the former Hong Kong International Airport, closed since 1998)
- Kai Tak Development
- British Forces Overseas Hong Kong
