= List of storms named Wanda =

The name Wanda has been used for twelve tropical cyclones worldwide.

In the Atlantic:

- Tropical Storm Wanda (2021), a weak storm that meandered in the open Atlantic; developed from an extratropical nor'easter that affected much of the Northeastern United States.

In the Eastern Pacific:

- Tropical Storm Wanda (1959), never threatened land.

In the Western Pacific:

- Tropical Storm Wanda (1945) (T4520)
- Typhoon Wanda (1951) (T5121)
- Typhoon Wanda (1956) (T5612, 08W), a destructive typhoon that made landfall in eastern China near Zhoushan, Zhejiang.
- Typhoon Wanda (1962) (T6259), Category 2 typhoon that made landfall in Hong Kong.
- Typhoon Wanda (1965) (T6508, 06W)
- Typhoon Wanda (1967) (T6730, 26W)
- Typhoon Wanda (1971) (T7104, 04W, Diding)
- Tropical Storm Wanda (1974) (T7401, 01W, Atang)
- Tropical Storm Wanda (1977) (T7706, 08W)

In the Australian region:

- Tropical Cyclone Wanda (1974) – A weak tropical cyclone that inflicted catastrophic flooding in Brisbane.
