= Typhoon Wanda (1956) =

Pacific typhoon in 1956

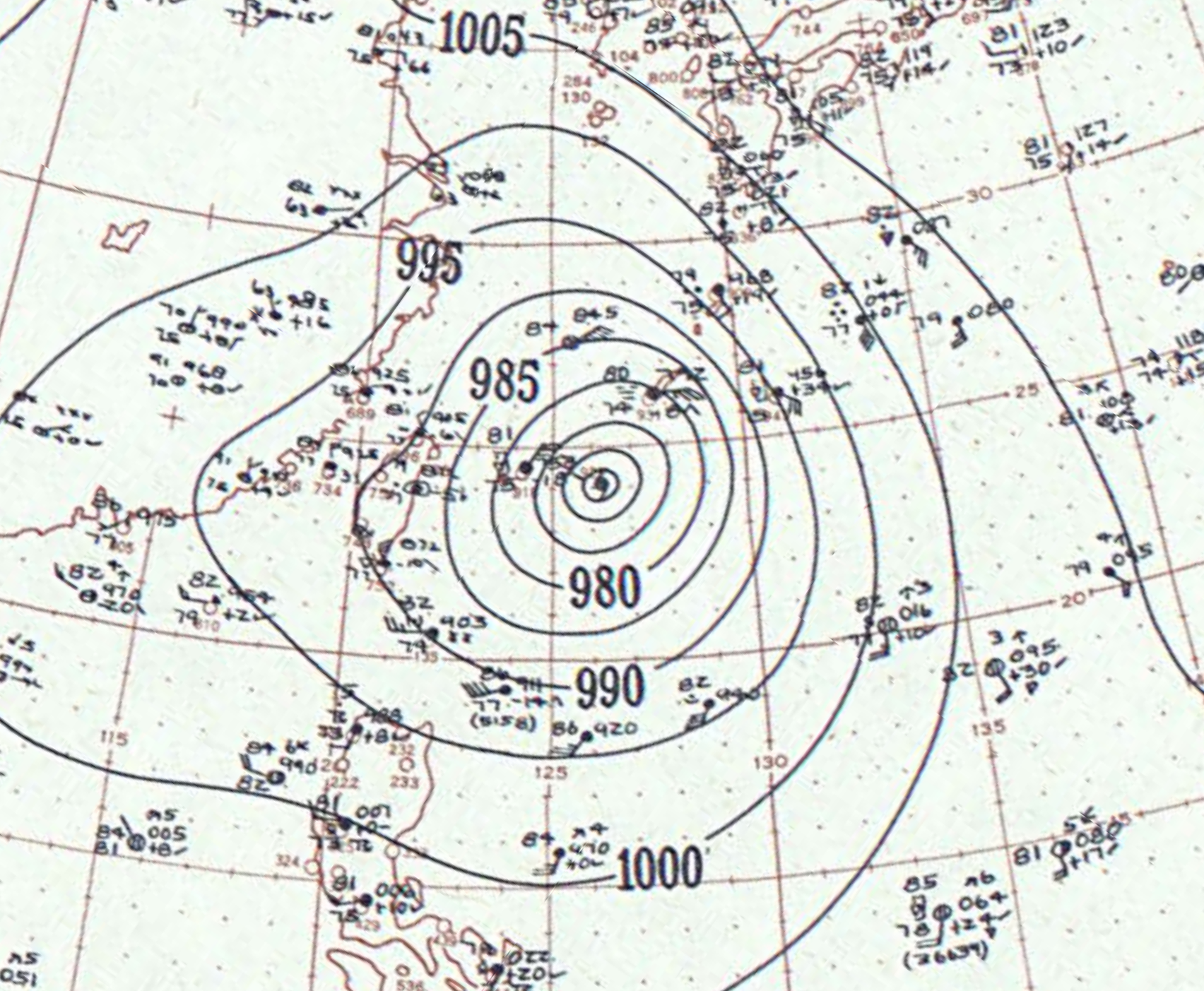
- Surface weather analysis of Wanda near peak intensity on July 31

Meteorological history
- Formed: July 25, 1956
- Dissipated: August 5, 1956

Typhoon
- 10-minute sustained (JMA)
- Lowest pressure: 902 hPa (mbar); 26.64 inHg

Category 5-equivalent super typhoon
- 1-minute sustained (SSHWS/JTWC)
- Highest winds: 295 km/h (185 mph)

Overall effects
- Fatalities: 4,935
- Injuries: 16,617
- Areas affected: China (most notably Zhejiang), Taiwan, Ryukyu Islands, Northern Mariana Islands
- IBTrACS
- Part of the 1956 Pacific typhoon season

Typhoon Wanda was a large, powerful and deadly tropical cyclone that became one of the deadliest typhoons to impact China, and was the strongest typhoon to impact Zhejiang since Typhoon Nina in 1953. The eleventh depression, fourth named storm and second super typhoon of the 1956 Pacific typhoon season, Wanda originated as a tropical disturbance meandering around the Northern Mariana Islands. One day after initially being located, the disturbance was officially recognized as a tropical depression and shortly thereafter, a tropical storm. On July 27, the typhoon underwent rapid intensification where it quickly intensified into a strong typhoon. (Note: Rapid intensification is defined when the winds of a tropical cyclone intensify by at least 30 knots (55 km/h; 35 mph) in a 24-hour period.) The typhoon reached its peak intensity on July 30, where the Japan Meteorological Agency estimated barometric pressure of 905 hPa (mbar) and the Joint Typhoon Warning Center estimated 1-minute sustained winds of 295 km/h (183 mph). The typhoon made landfall in Ningbo on August 1, where it quickly weakened and eventually dissipated.

== Meteorological history ==
Map plotting the storm's track and intensity, according to the Saffir–Simpson scale Map key Saffir–Simpson scale Tropical depression (≤38 mph, ≤62 km/h) Tropical storm (39–73 mph, 63–118 km/h) Category 1 (74–95 mph, 119–153 km/h) Category 2 (96–110 mph, 154–177 km/h) Category 3 (111–129 mph, 178–208 km/h) Category 4 (130–156 mph, 209–251 km/h) Category 5 (≥157 mph, ≥252 km/h) Unknown Storm type Tropical cyclone Subtropical cyclone Extratropical cyclone, remnant low, tropical disturbance, or monsoon depression

A tropical depression developed southwest of Guam on July 25. It moved north-northeastward, passing east of the Northern Marianas. On July 27, it intensified into a tropical storm and was designated Wanda. On the same day, the storm turned more westward, steered by the subtropical ridge to the north. Low wind shear and warm waters allowed Wanda to intensify steadily, developing into an intense typhoon. On July 30, reconnaissance aircraft recorded a minimum pressure of 902 mbar (26.6 inHg), and the peak winds were estimated at 295 km/h (185 mph). After passing through the Miyako Islands, Wanda weakened slightly and traversed the East China Sea. On August 1, the typhoon made landfall in eastern China near Zhoushan, Zhejiang, producing a pressure of 923 mbar (27.3 inHg); this was the lowest pressure recorded in China from a tropical cyclone. Wanda slowly weakened while progressing through China, dissipating on August 5.

== Impact ==
Taipei on Taiwan recorded 297.3 mm (11.70 in) of rainfall over three days while the typhoon would pass to the north. Along the coast of Zhejiang, Wanda produced a 5.02 m (16.5 ft) storm surge that destroyed 465 seawalls and 902 boats. The storm also flooded crop fields, destroying 20,380 tons of wheat. Across Zhejiang, 2.2 million houses and 38.5% of the main roads were damaged during the storm. Nationwide, Wanda killed 4,935 people and injured 16,617 others.

Effects of Typhoon Wanda

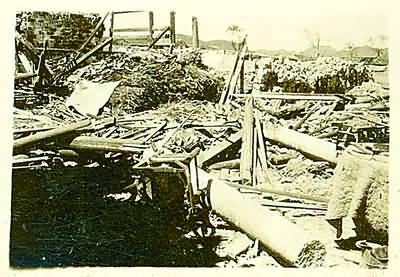
Damage caused by Wanda

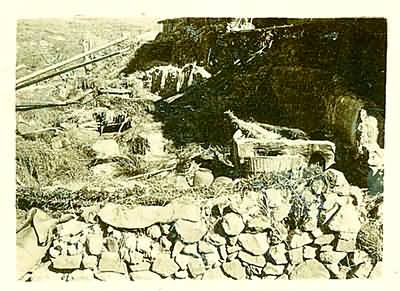
Damage caused by Wanda

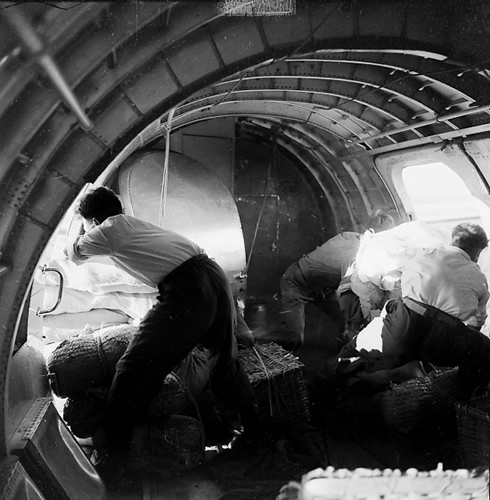
Certain air force personnel carry relief supplies onto a plane after the typhoon

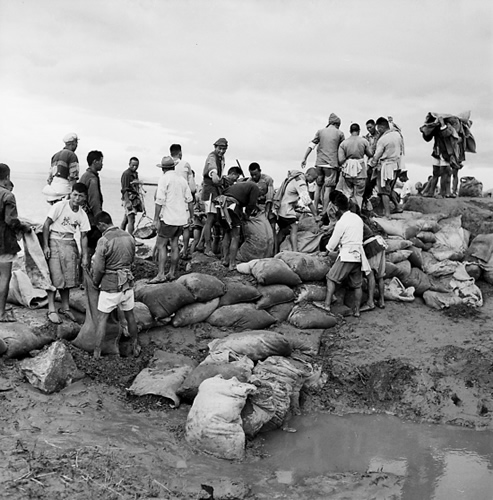
Seawall being repaired after the typhoon

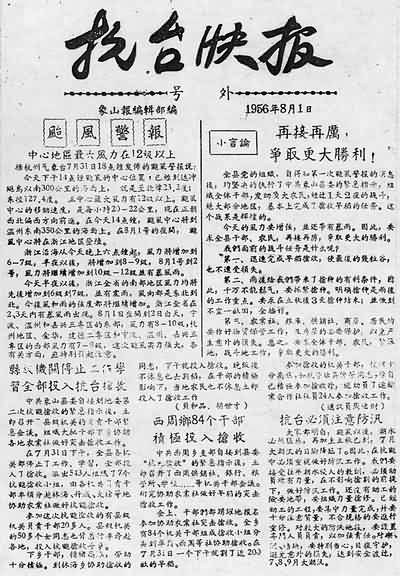
Xiangshan Newsletter when Wanda made landfall

== See also ==
- Other tropical cyclones of the same name
