= Sha Tin Airfield =

Former airport in New Territories, Hong Kong

Shatin Airfield RAF Shatin
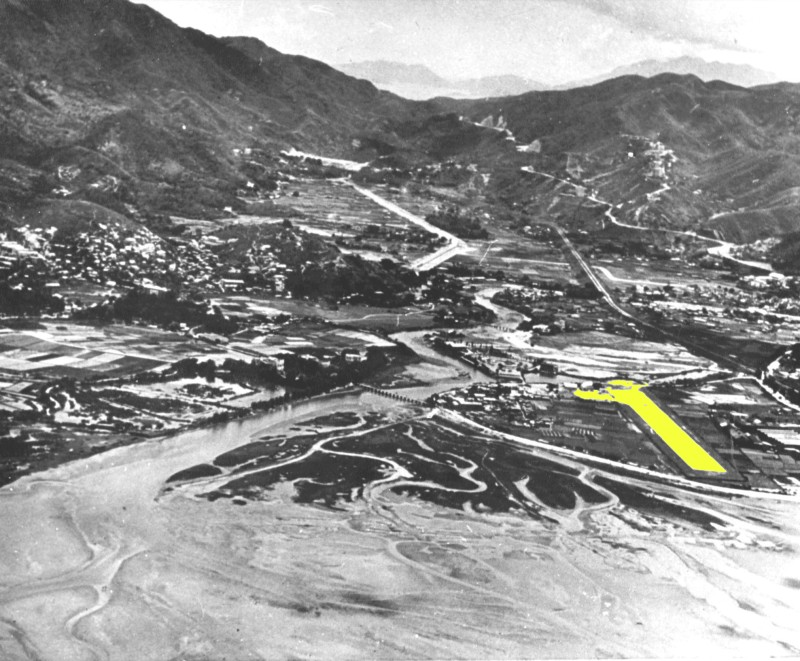
- Runway of Sha Tin Airfield (highlighted in yellow)
- IATA: N/A; ICAO: VHST

Summary
- Airport type: Military, Defunct
- Owner: British Hong Kong
- Operator: Royal Air Force, Army Air Corps
- Serves: Shatin, New Territories, Hong Kong
- Location: Sha Tin
- Elevation AMSL: 26 ft (7.9 m)
- Coordinates: 22.38024°N 114.18983°E
- Interactive map of Shatin Airfield

Runways
Direction	Length		Surface
Direction	ft	m	Surface
05/23	1,969	600	Paved concrete

Sha Tin Airfield was a small military airfield in Sha Tin, New Territories, Hong Kong, which had a single concrete runway. The airfield was located along the Shing Mun River and looked out to Tide Cove. The airfield served as a Flight (military unit) location for most of the location's existence.

The airfield was destroyed by storm surge from Typhoon Wanda in 1962, and subsequently abandoned. It was demolished in the early 1970s as the RAF consolidated their operations at RAF Shek Kong and later re-developed as part of the New Town project for Shatin.

== Location ==
Sha Tin Airfield was located near the Sha Tin station of the Kowloon-Canton Railway British Section, next to the shallow shores of Tide Cove.

The runway is now the site of the Hong Kong Heritage Museum, New Town Plaza Phase 3 and Royal Park Hotel, while the base is currently occupied by Sha Tin Park.

== History ==
Before Sha Tin Airfield was built, Belgian pilot Charles van den Born flew his Farman Mk II bi-plane "Wanda" from an airfield in the area on 18 March 1911. In 1997 a 1:1 replica of the plane named Spirit of Shatin (沙田精神號), was made and displayed at the Hong Kong International Airport.

In 1949, Sha Tin Airfield was built for use by the Royal Air Force (as RAF Shatin). The designation as an RAF airfield was brief and was transferred to the British Army's Army Air Corps (AAC). In the 1950s and 1960, the AAC rotated in various air observation post Flight units from United Kingdom to Hong Kong:

- No. 20 Independent Reconnaissance Flight
- No. 1900 Independent Air Observation Post Flight RAF between 21 April 1953 and 1 September 1957
- No. 1903 Air Observation Post Flight RAF between 11 April 1949 and 10 July 1951
- No. 7 Flight AAC
- No. 8 Flight AAC
- No. 12 Flight AAC
- No. 16 Flight AAC
- No. 25 Flight AAC
- No. 29 Flight AAC

The air observation post were under the command of the 40th Infantry Division. The airfield operated the Auster AOP.6, an aircraft also used by the Royal Hong Kong Auxiliary Air Force.

During the late 1950s a private club used the airfield to fly RC model airplanes. The club remained at the airfield until 1970.

In 1962, Typhoon Wanda severely damaged much of the site and moved to Kai Tak airport to relocate with the RAF around 1963. Subsequently, the airfield was demolished in the early 1970s to make way for developing the Sha Tin New Town.

== Facilities ==
The airfield consisted of a single 600 metres (2,000 ft) runway, direction 05/23. Facilities at the airfield consisted of a small control tower, building and hangars made of corrugated steel sections. The mansion of Ho Tung Lau located at the edge of the Tide Cove adjacent to the KCR railway, was used as the air observation post headquarters building.

== See also ==
- Military of Hong Kong
- British Forces Overseas Hong Kong
- Sek Kong Airfield
- RAF Kai Tak
- Aviation history of Hong Kong
