= List of airports in Hong Kong =

Hong Kong became an international transport hub of cargo and passengers soon after 1841. In air transport, Hong Kong International Airport acts as a major international hubs for both passenger and cargo. The ICAO code for the Hong Kong Flight Information Region (Hong Kong FIR) is VHHK, while ICAO code for Hong Kong in general starts with the prefix VH××.

The Hong Kong International Airport and heliports are generally under the jurisdiction of the Civil Aviation Department of Hong Kong, while the only military airport is under the jurisdiction of the People's Liberation Army Air Force. Helipads are commonly found in Hong Kong especially in large government buildings, and accourding to Hong Kong Government's record, there are about 170 helicopter landing pads (helipads) in Hong Kong.

== Airports and heliports ==
Airports across the Hong Kong SAR
- Civil international airport
- Mixed civil and military airport
- Heliports
- Military airstrips

Airport name	ICAO	IATA	Status	District
Current airports
Hong Kong International Airport	VHHH	HKG	Civil (1998–present)	Islands
Shek Kong Airfield	VHSK	-	Royal Air Force (1938–1997); People's Liberation Army Air Force (1997–present)	Yuen Long
Closed airports
Kai Tak Airport / RAF Kai Tak	~~VHHH~~	~~HKG~~	Civil (1925–1998); Royal Air Force (1927–1978)	Kowloon City
Sha Tin Airfield	~~VHST~~		Royal Air Force (1949–1962)	Sha Tin
Current heliports
Shun Tak Heliport	VHST	HHP	Heliport (1990–present)	Central and Western
HKCEC Heliport			Heliport (2012–present)	Wan Chai

== Nearby Locations ==
Due to the airport’s location on Lantau Island, several hotels are directly connected to or located near the airport. These include the Regal Airport Hotel, Hong Kong SkyCity Marriott, and Novotel Citygate Hong Kong. Budget and luxury options are available in Tung Chung and along the Airport Express line.

== See also ==
- Aviation history of Hong Kong
- Transport in Hong Kong
