= The Troubles in Bessbrook =

Incidents in Bessbrook, County Armagh, Northern Ireland during the Troubles

The Troubles in Bessbrook recounts incidents during and the effects of the Troubles in Bessbrook, County Armagh, Northern Ireland.

Bessbrook saw some of the worst violence in the Troubles. 25 British soldiers and local Protestants, all male, lost their lives. Four soldiers died in a non-combat related air accident, but the rest (21 men) were killed by the Provisional Irish Republican Army (IRA).

The linen mill was converted by the British Army into a major military base. A helicopter landing area was established to supply other military outposts in the area since road-borne movements of troops and supplies were vulnerable to landmine attack. At one stage the little village was reportedly the busiest helicopter airport in Europe, more so than the major heliports supplying the North Sea oil rigs. For many years British Army helicopters would take off and land every few minutes. To avoid the risk of missile attack they would fly at rooftop level over the village. For a time, direct access to much of the village was sealed off by security barriers to minimise the risk of vehicle-borne bomb attacks on the security forces. Some have claimed that this contributed to the commercial decline of local businesses.

Incidents in Bessbrook during the Troubles:

== 1975 ==
- 4 June 1975 - Francis Jordan (21), a member of the Provisional IRA, was shot dead by the British Army while planting a bomb at the Pit Bar, Mill Vale, Bessbrook.

== 1976 ==
- 5 January 1976 - John McConville (20), Walter Chapman (23), Reginald Chapman (25), Joseph Lemon (46), James McWhirter (58), Kenneth Wharton (24), Robert Chambers (19), John Bryans (46), Robert Freeburn (50) and Robert Walker (46), all Protestant civilians, were shot dead by the South Armagh Republican Action Force (a cover name used by the IRA) shortly after their firm's minibus was stopped at a bogus vehicle check point at Kingsmills, near Bessbrook and Whitecross, while travelling home from work at the textiles factory in Glenanne. The men were ordered to state their religious denomination. A Catholic was released, while all Protestants were shot with automatic weapons. Ten died at the scene and one man (Alan Black) survived despite being struck eighteen times. For more information see Kingsmill massacre.

== 1979 ==
- 17 April 1979 - Paul Gray (25), Robert Lockhart (44), Richard Baird (28) and Noel Webb (30), all Protestant members of the Royal Ulster Constabulary (RUC), were killed by a Provisional IRA remote-controlled bomb hidden in a parked van, and detonated when their mobile patrol drove past, Bessbrook. The bomb was estimated at 1,000 pound and was believed to be the largest bomb used by the IRA up to that date. In January 1981, Patrick Joseph Traynor (27) from Crossmaglen was found guilty of the four murders and a range of other charges. He was jailed for life on each of the four murder charges and was sentenced to 12 years for the related crimes.

== 1981 ==
- 19 May 1981 - Andrew Gavin (19), Paul Bulman (19), Michael Bagshaw (25), John King (20) and Grenville Winstone (27), all members of the British Army, were killed in a Provisional Irish Republican Army land mine attack on their Saracen armoured personnel carrier on the Chancellors Road near Bessbrook.

== 1993 ==
- 1 March 1993 - The RUC barracks was struck by a barrack buster mortar. There were no fatalities, although four people were injured, and extensive damage was caused to some fifty homes and the neighbouring Anglican church.

== 1997 ==
- 12 February 1997 - British Army Lance Bombardier Stephen Restorick (23) was killed by a Provisional Irish Republican Army sniper's bullet while manning a vehicle checkpoint on Green Road, Bessbrook. He was the last British soldier killed in Northern Ireland during The Troubles.
