= Hong Kong Aviation Club =

Aviation Club in Hong Kong

- Traditional Chinese: 香港飛行總會
- Simplified Chinese: 香港飞行总会
- Jyutping: Hoeng1 gong2 fei1 hang4 zung2 wui6*2
Transcriptions
Standard Mandarin
- Hanyu Pinyin: Xiānggǎng Fēixíng Zǒnghuì
Yue: Cantonese
- Yale Romanization: Hēung góng fēi hàhng júng wuih
- Jyutping: Hoeng1 gong2 fei1 hang4 zung2 wui6*2

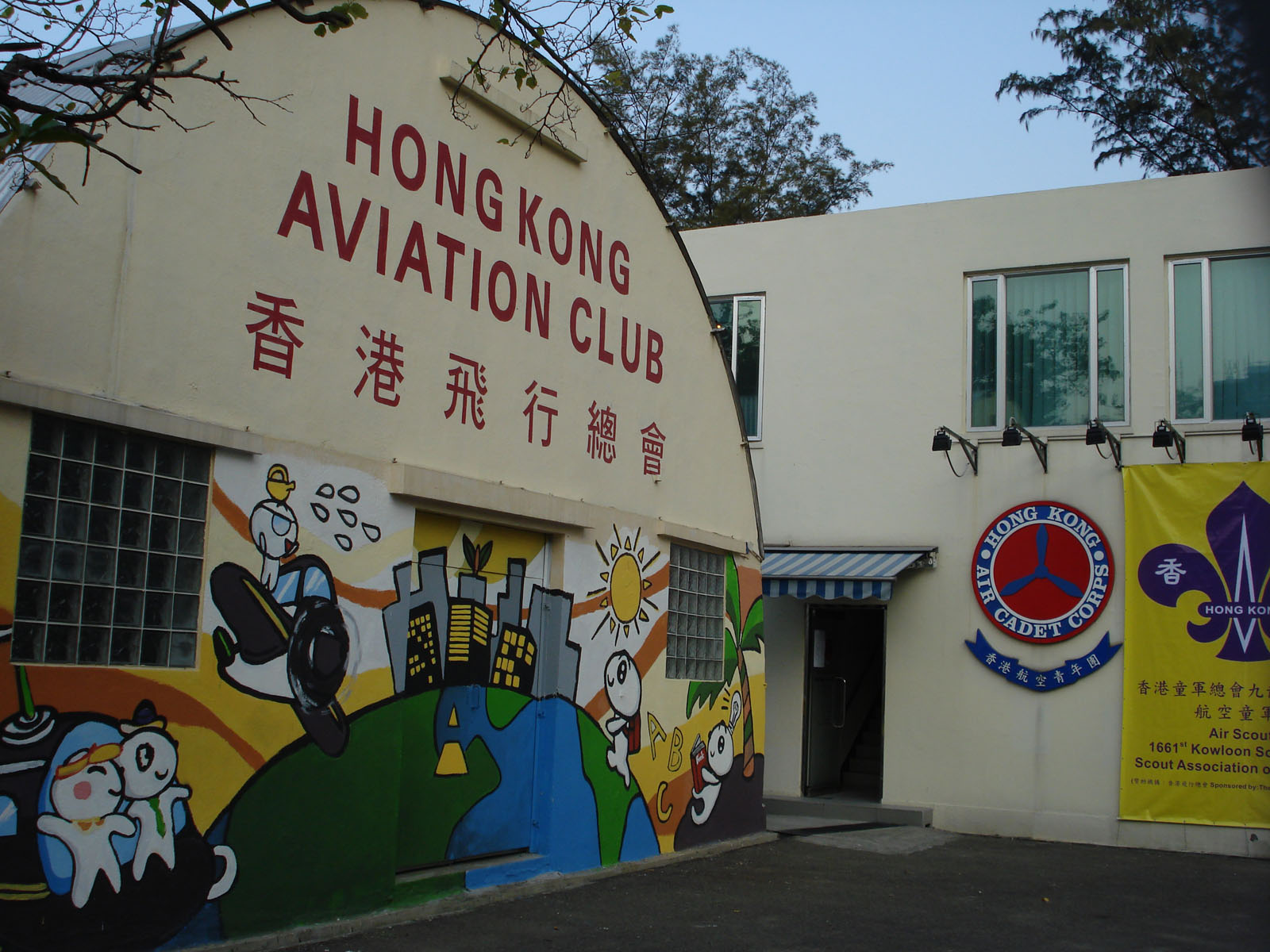
Hong Kong Aviation Club building at the former Kai Tak International Airport, with the headquarters of the Hong Kong Air Cadet Corps

The Hong Kong Aviation Club is an aviation club which offers training on both fixed-wing aircraft and helicopter to Private Pilot Licence Level. It was established in 1982 upon the amalgamation of the Hong Kong Flying Club, the Aero Club of Hong Kong and the Far East Flying Training School.

== History ==
The Hong Kong Flying Club was formed in the late 1920s when the governor, Sir Cecil Clementi, presided over the inaugural meeting on 20 December 1929. Flight training commenced at Kai Tak in the second half of 1930 and followed by commercial services six years later with the arrival of Dorado from Malaysia on 24 March 1936.

It formerly held most of its activities at Kai Tak Airport, where it had hangars and other facilities. The club moved most of its aircraft to Shek Kong Airfield in 1994 after the hours for general aviation at Kai Tak were sharply reduced, to two hours per morning, as of 1 July that year. Kai Tak closed to fixed-wing traffic in 1998. The club ended its helicopter activities at Kai Tak on 9 July 2017. The Kai Tak location, which it was able to use all days of the week, meant that helicopter training took less time compared to fixed-wing training, as usage at Shek Kong is restricted to weekends.

At the end of October 2019, an email was sent to members indicating that the military airstrip needed repairs and would be temporarily closed.

== The club today ==
Today, the Aviation Club remains as the only Kai Tak heritage and history of the former Kai Tak Airport. Part of the Administration building, located at 31 Sung Wong Toi Road (Note: The official website of the club gives their address as 31 Sung Wong Toi Road, Kowloon City, whereas external sources give the address as 31 Sung Wong Toi Road, Ma Tau Chung.) is used for the headquarters of the Hong Kong Air Cadet Corps through the courtesy of the Aviation Club. Hong Kong Aviation Club is also the home to the 1661st Scout Group and the Hong Kong Aviation Club Foundation, a charity organisation which promote General Aviation in Hong Kong to the youth. The Hong Kong Aviation Club remains the only organisation in Hong Kong which offers training on both fixed-wing aircraft and helicopter to Private Pilot Licence Level, including all required ground course subjects. The club is also the only organisation in Hong Kong where such a licence can be kept current.

The club's fleet of seven Cessna planes and five Robinson helicopters is available for both training and leisure flying. All flying activities take place at Shek Kong Airfield. Full-time qualified engineers are employed to maintain aircraft of the club as well as members' aircraft. Hangar facilities are both located at Shek Kong Airfield and Kai Tak Airport. General aviation aircraft are not permitted at Hong Kong International Airport at Chek Lap Kok without prior approval from the Civil Aviation Department and the Hong Kong Airport Authority. Since 2003, the Aviation Club has organised a number of cross country flight into Macau and Southern China with departure from Chek Lap Kok.

The club is a member of the Fédération Aéronautique Internationale (FAI), and is the local authority representing the FAI to issue Sporting Licences for Hong Kong participants as well as the National Sports Association (NSA) for Hong Kong in Aviation.

== Membership ==
The club offers two major levels of membership: Full Membership (Flying) and Non-flying Membership. Full membership provides individuals with access to flight training and leisure flying. General membership provides Non-Flying members with the opportunity to access to General Aviation activities and dining facilities of the club. Membership is open to all Hong Kong residents.

== Fleet ==
- Cessna 172P United States
- Cessna 152 Aerobat United States
- Cessna 152United States
- Beagle Aircraft Beagle Pup United Kingdom (retired)
- Cessna 172N United States
- Cessna 172R United States
- Cessna 182 United States
- Robinson Helicopter R22 and R44 United States

== See also ==
- Hong Kong Air Cadet Corps
