= Shek Kong Airfield =

Military airbase in Hong Kong

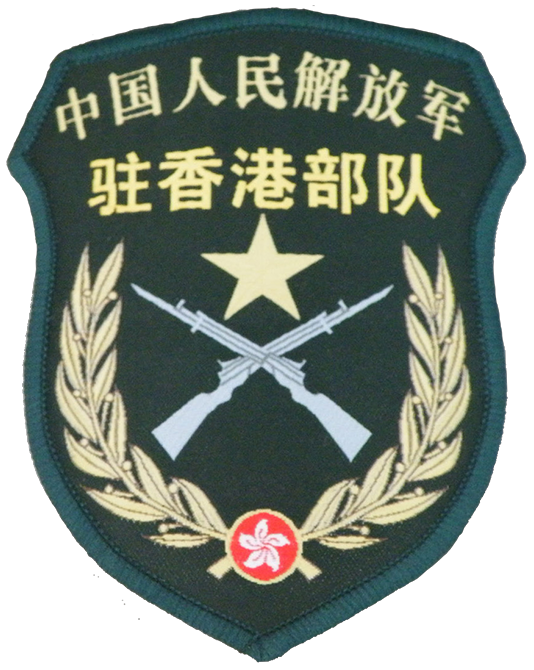
Shek Kong Airfield

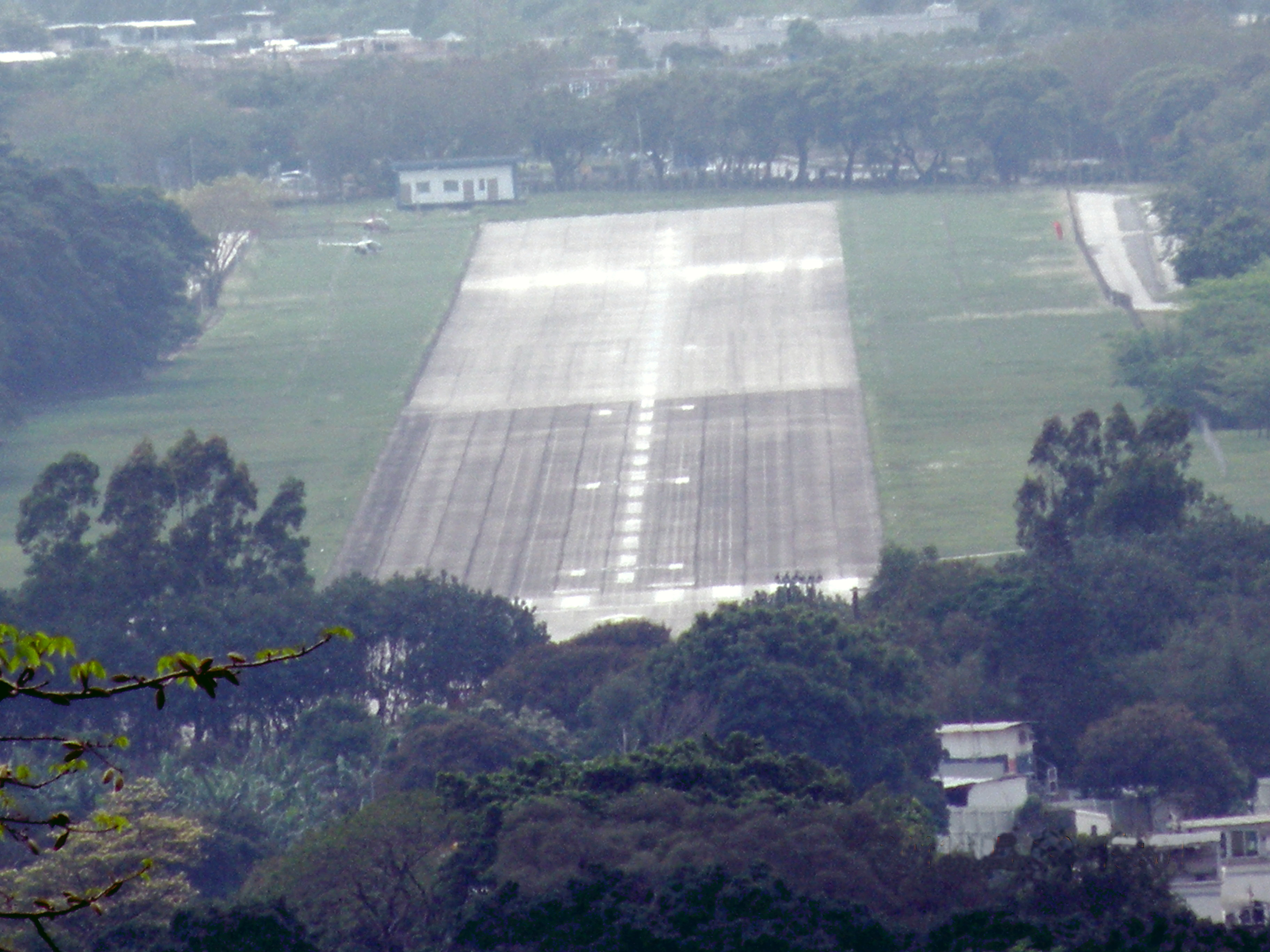
- Approach view of Shek Kong Airfield runway
- IATA: none; ICAO: VHSK

Summary
- Airport type: Military
- Operator: Royal Air Force (1938–1997); People's Liberation Army Air Force (1997–present)
- Serves: British Hong Kong; (1938–1997): Hong Kong SAR; (1997–present)
- Location: Shek Kong, New Territories, Hong Kong
- Opened: 1950; 76 years ago
- Built: 1938; 88 years ago
- Elevation AMSL: 15 m (49 ft)
- Coordinates: 22°26′11″N 114°4′50″E

Map
- Location of Shek Kong Airfield in Hong Kong

Runways
| Direction | Length | | Surface |
| Direction | m | ft | Surface |
|---|---|---|---|
| 11/29 | 1,905 | 6,250 | Concrete |

Shek Kong Airfield
- Traditional Chinese: 石崗機場
- Simplified Chinese: 石岗机场
Transcriptions
Standard Mandarin
- Hanyu Pinyin: Shí Gǎng Jīchǎng
Yue: Cantonese
- Yale Romanization: Sehk gōng gēi chèuhng
- Jyutping: Sek6 gong1 gei1 coeng4

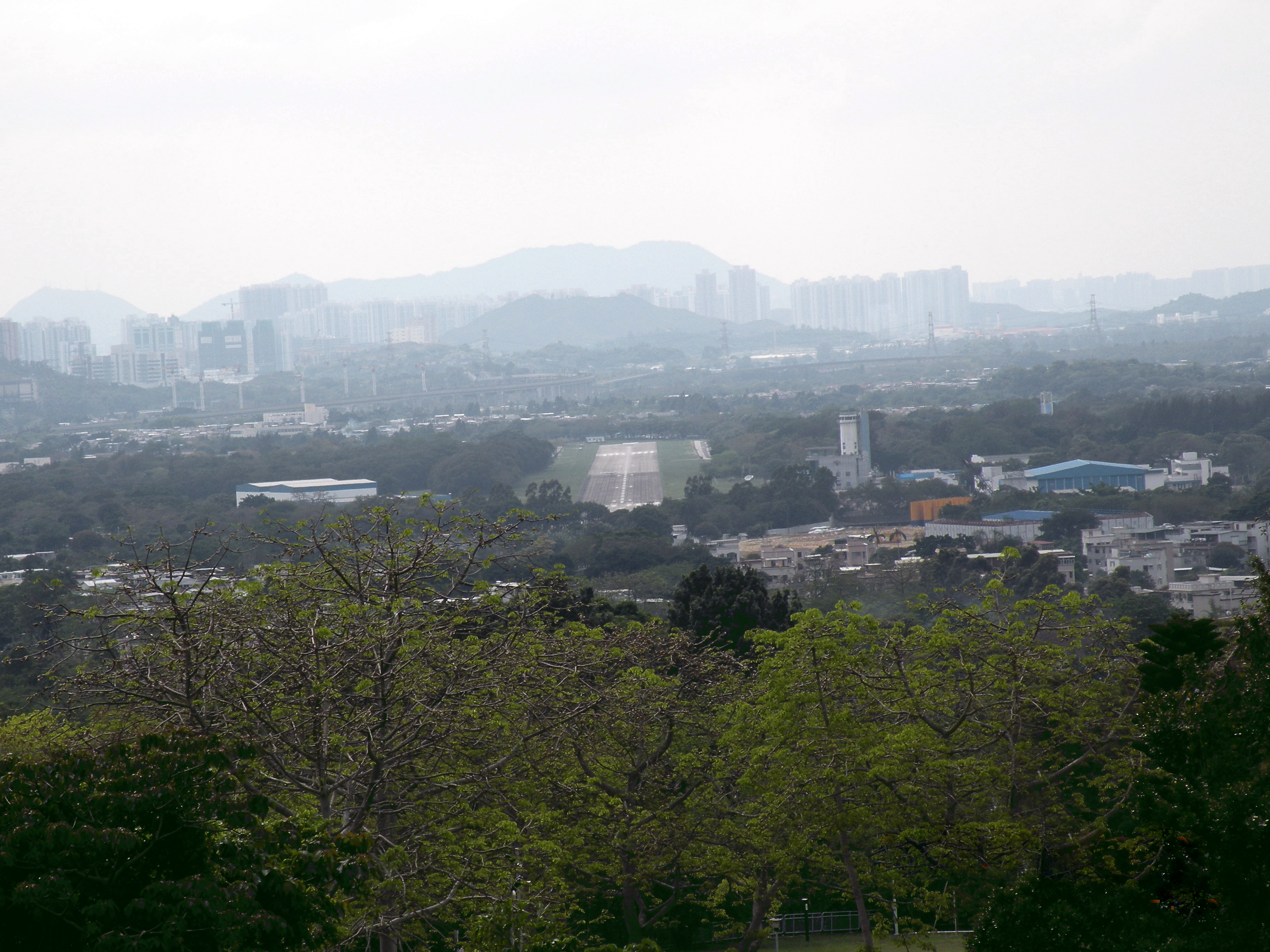
Shek Kong Airfield

Shek Kong Airfield (Chinese: 石崗機場, ICAO: VHSK, formerly RAF Sek Kong) is the sole airbase of the People's Liberation Army Air Force in Hong Kong, located in Shek Kong, New Territories. It falls under the Southern Theater Command Air Force and houses air force units of People's Liberation Army Hong Kong Garrison (PLAHKG). It was previously open for restricted civilian use during weekends.

Prior the handover of Hong Kong, the airfield was used by the British Forces Overseas Hong Kong and known as RAF Sek Kong.

== RAF base (1938–1997) ==
Before the British handover of Hong Kong to China in 1997, the airfield was used by the British Forces Overseas Hong Kong as a Royal Air Force (RAF) station. It was officially known as Royal Air Force Sek Kong, commonly abbreviated RAF Sek Kong. Construction started in 1938 and was completed in 1950, with a hiatus during 1941–1945 due to the Japanese occupation of Hong Kong during World War II.

Between 1989 and 1993, RAF Sek Kong was also a Vietnamese Refugee Detention Centre for Vietnamese boat people arriving in Hong Kong. Numbers peaked in 1992 with the centre hosting 9,000 refugees. Half of the runway was temporarily closed and used for temporary housing (mainly tents, and some quonset huts). As a result, only rotary aircraft operated from the base, until the refugee's centre closure – after which the runway was restored for use by fixed-wing aircraft in 1995.

The airbase was also used by private recreational flying organisation, Hong Kong Aviation Club (HKAC). It moved most of its aircraft to Shek Kong in 1994, after Kai Tak Airport (then the city's international airport) sharply reduced the hours for general aviation to two hours every morning (07:00 to 09:00) that year.

RAF Sek Kong hosted a single RAF squadron from 1950 to 1996. It was a permanent assignment, with personnel and their families living in Sek Kong for three-year tours of duty. The Royal Hong Kong Auxiliary Air Force (RHK AuxAF) was also a permanent air force unit operating at the airbase.

A partial list of RAF squadrons stationed at RAF Sek Kong before 1997:

- No. 80 Squadron RAF: 3 January – 1 February 1950, 7 March – 28 April 1950
- No. 28 Squadron RAF: 1 May – 7 October 1950, 28 March 1951 – 15 August 1955, 5 December 1955 – 14 June 1957, 17 May 1978 – 1 November 1996
- Royal Hong Kong Auxiliary Air Force 1979–1993

A list of RAF aircraft stationed at RAF Sek Kong:

| builder / model | type | number | dates | operator |
|---|---|---|---|---|
| Supermarine Spitfire F.24 | fighter | | 1949–1951 | No. 80 Squadron RAF |
| de Havilland Vampire | fighter | | 1951–1954 | |
| de Havilland Hornet | fighter | | 1951–1955 | No. 80 Squadron RAF |
| Westland Wessex | helicopter | | 1978–1996 | No. 28 Squadron RAF |

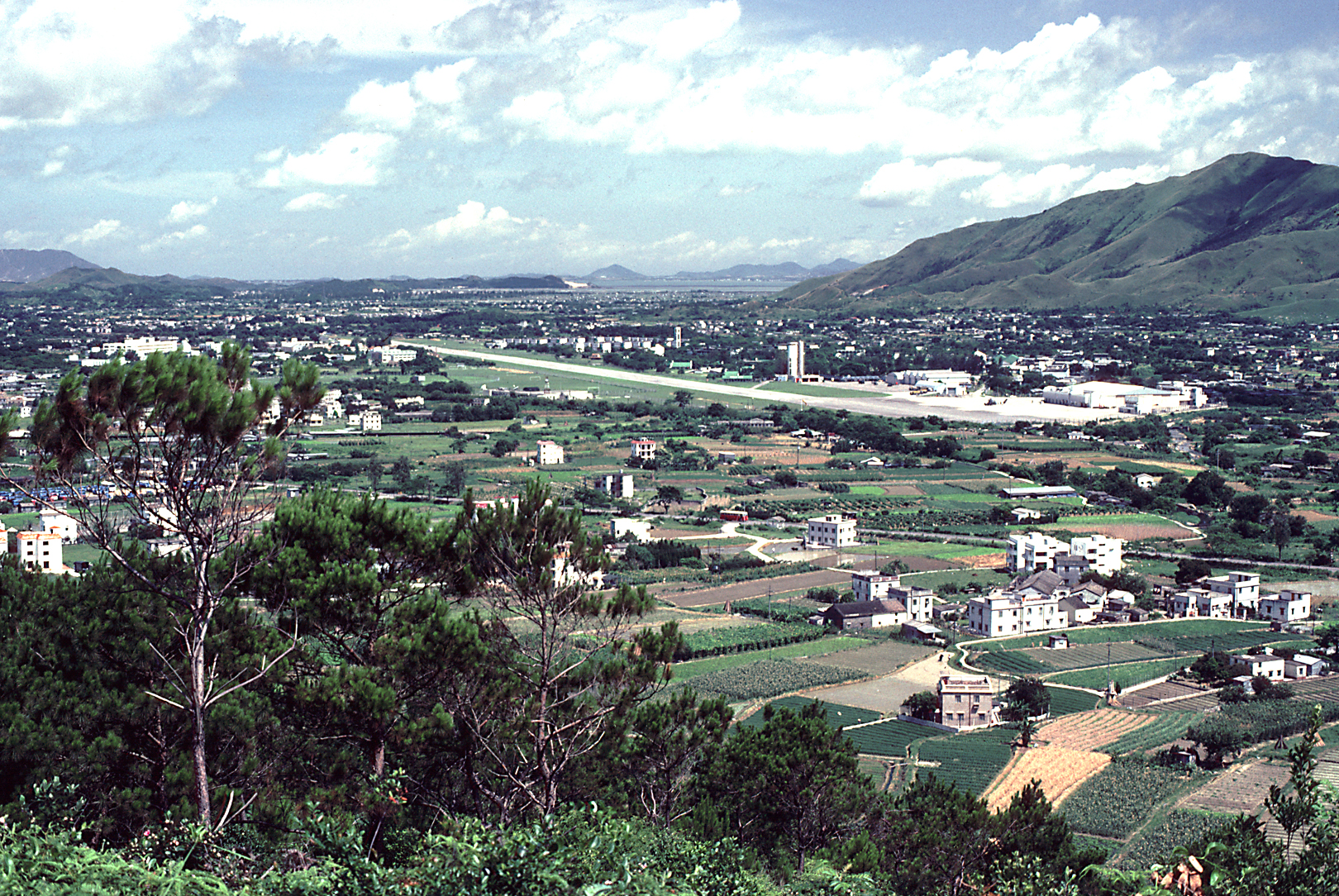
RAF Sek Kong 1983

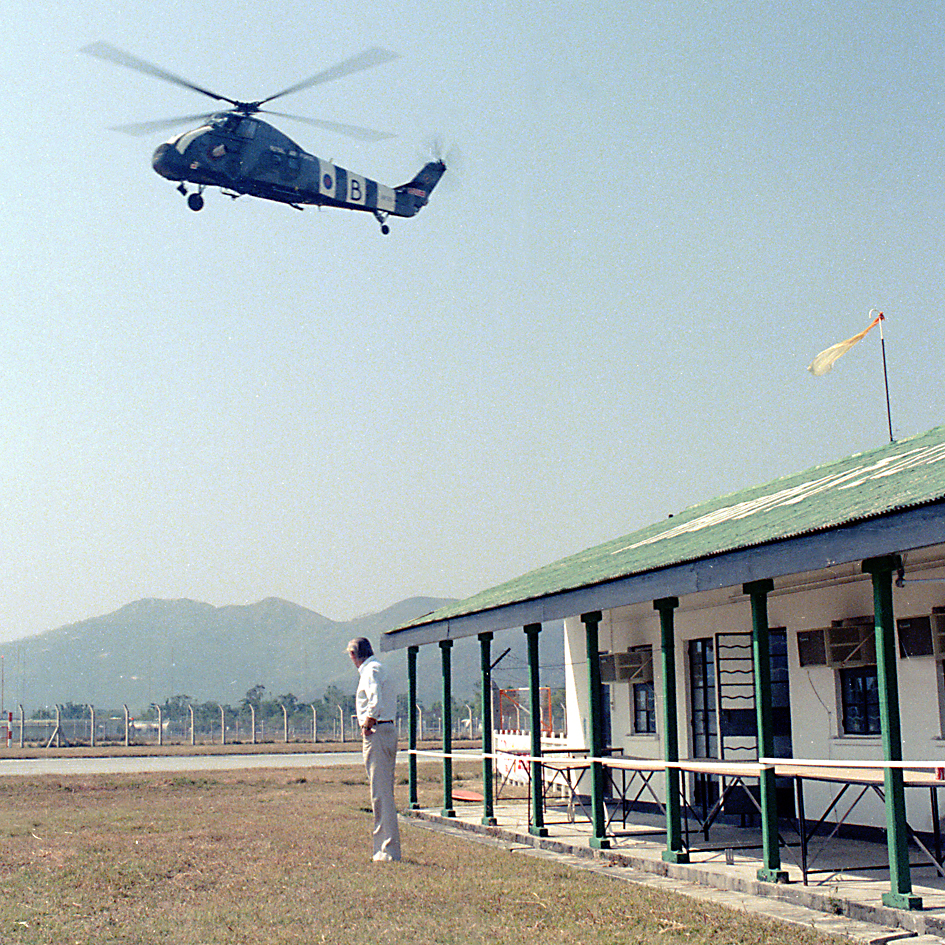
Westland Wessex of No. 28 Squadron RAF

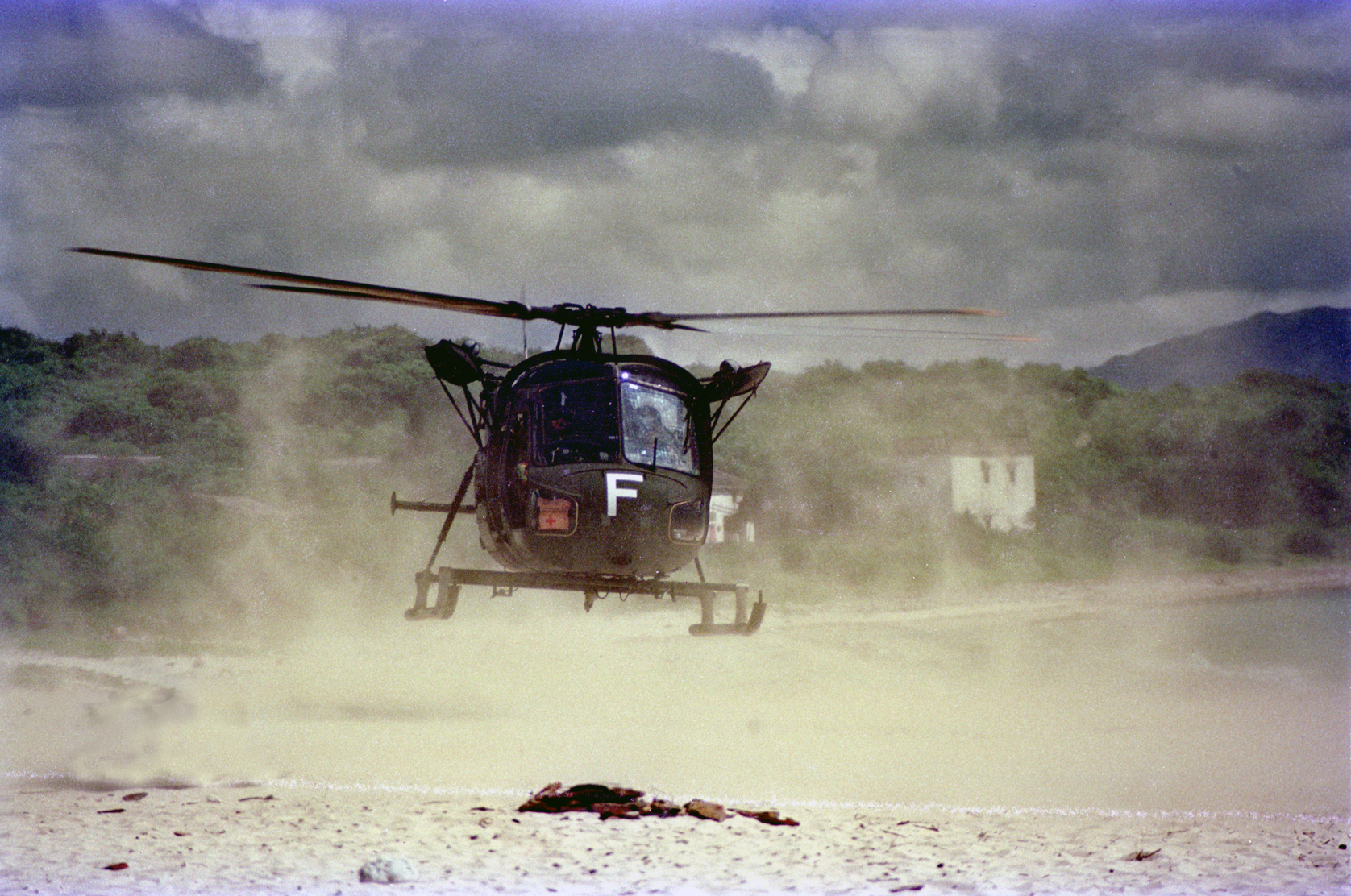
Westland Scout of No. 660 Squadron AAC

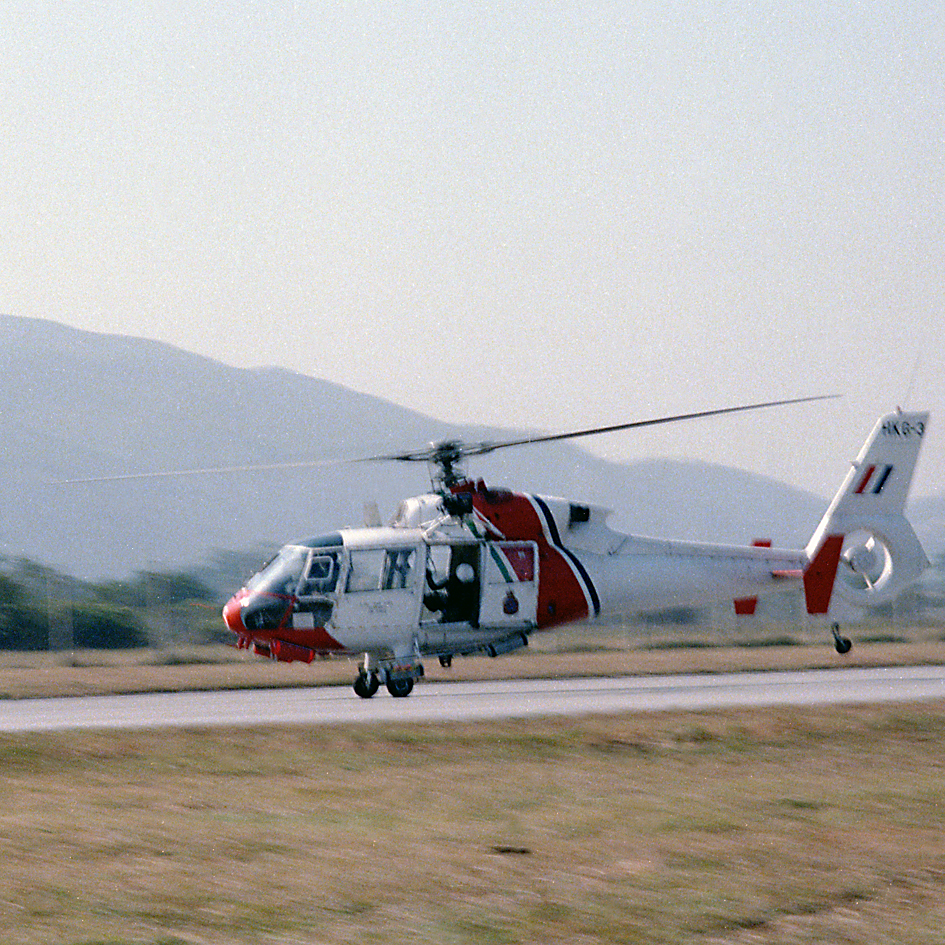
Dauphin of RHKAAF

The British Army also operated a squadron of helicopters at RAF Sek Kong from 1970 until 1993, performing reconnaissance and troop-lifting roles at the city's border with mainland China, and supporting the army on exercises. The Army Air Corps (AAC) unit was heavily involved in stemming the influx of illegal immigrants from mainland China. No. 660 Squadron AAC operated from 1978 until the end of 1993. The AAC squadron, 50 years old at the time, was the last overseas unit using Westland Scout helicopters.

Support equipment

| Manufacturer / Model | Type | Number | Dates | Details |
|---|---|---|---|---|
| Bedford | RL tipper truck | | 1980s–1990s | |
| Later model Thornycroft Antar (pre-1984) and Scammell Commander (post 1984) | tank transporters (tractor and trailer) | | 1980s–1990s | By Gurkha Transport Regiment |

== PLAAF base (1997–present) ==
After the handover of Hong Kong in 1997, Shek Kong airfield became an airbase of the People's Liberation Army Air Force (PLAAF) There is one PLA unit stationed in Shek Kong:

- PLAAF Helicopter Regiment 39968
  - Hong Kong Special Aviation Unit — transport

| builder / model | type | number | dates | details |
|---|---|---|---|---|
| HAMC Harbin Z-9B | Utility helicopters | 12 | 1997–present | |

The PLA ground and naval forces also use Shek Kong, mainly for training and Open Day use.

With the PLAAF operating helicopters, the runway is mostly used for civilian fixed wing aircraft. There are four 'H's marked along the runway for the Harbin Z-9Bs to land, and avoided the need to create helipads at the base.

It is currently used by the People's Liberation Army (PLA) during the week, during weekends members of the Hong Kong Aviation Club (HKAC) used to be allowed to use the airport facilities for operation of private aeroplanes and to conduct private flight training.

== See also ==
- List of airports in Hong Kong
- Former overseas RAF Stations
- List of People's Liberation Army Air Force airbases
- Hong Kong Aviation Club
