= Royal Hong Kong Auxiliary Air Force =

- Royal Hong Kong Auxiliary Air Force badge
- Active: 1949 - 1993
- Disbanded: 31 March 1993 (succeeded by the Government Flying Service)
- Country: British Hong Kong
- Type: Air Force
- Role: Aerial Defence Force
- Mottos: Semper Paratus; Always ready

Insignia
- Roundel

- Fin flash

- Government insignia

Aircraft flown
- Helicopter: Sikorsky S-70; Sikorsky S-76
- Patrol: Beechcraft Super King Air B200C

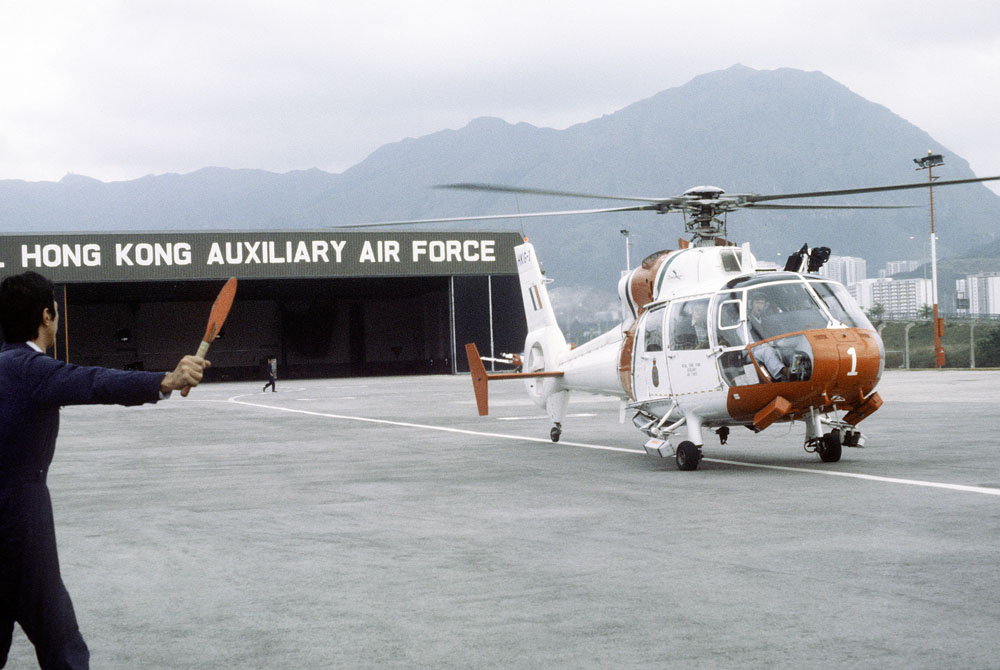
RHKAAF Aérospatiale SA365C1 Dauphin at Kai Tak in 1982

The Royal Hong Kong Auxiliary Air Force (RHKAAF) was a Hong Kong Government department based in Hong Kong. It was formed as an air force in 1949 as part of the Hong Kong Defence Force. In preparation for the transfer of sovereignty from the United Kingdom to the People's Republic of China, the unit was disbanded on 31 March 1993.

== History ==
The history of the unit goes way back to the early days of Hong Kong as a British colony. On 30 May 1854, with the departure from Hong Kong of the British men-of-war on anti-piracy duties in the north, following the Shanghai precedent, an appeal was made by the Lieutenant-Governor, Sir William Caine, for willing citizens to assemble for the purpose of forming an auxiliary police force to protect the lives and property of Hong Kong's inhabitants. Ninety-nine worthy men turned up and the Hong Kong Volunteer Corps was formed. Following numerous incarnations, the Royal Hong Kong Regiment (The Volunteers) and the Royal Hong Kong Auxiliary Air Force were spawned from this original corps of volunteers.

The HKAAF came into existence as an air force in 1949 as part of the Hong Kong Defence Force. From 1949 to 1970, it was known as the Hong Kong Auxiliary Air Force (HKAAF). Its royal title was approved by King George VI on 1 May 1951, as was that of what became the Royal Hong Kong Defence Force (RHKDF). This was the first time that a volunteer force had been so honoured.

When the Royal Hong Kong Defence Force was disbanded in 1970, the Royal Hong Kong Auxiliary Air Force (RHKAAF) and Royal Hong Kong Regiment (RHKR) were formed under new ordinances as separate units. The RHKAAF was finally disbanded on 31 March 1993, and succeeded the following day by the Hong Kong Government Flying Service (GFS), a newly created civilian unit using the original service staff of the RHKAAF.

Although technically an armed military unit, run on the lines of an RAF squadron, latterly the unit's responsibilities were mostly involved in providing non-military aviation services such as police support, search and rescue, flying doctor, air ambulance and firefighting in the colony.

The RHKAAF was based at Kai Tak Airport from 1949 to 1993.

== Badge ==
The last badge of the force was used until 1993, after which time, the Hong Kong Coat of Arms was used on GFS aircraft, until the handover in 1997:

- St Edward's Crown
- Octagon-shaped badge with a Hong Kong dragon, propeller
- Royal Hong Kong Auxiliary Air Force is contained on the band of the badge
- Motto contain the wording Semper Paratus (Latin, "Always Ready")
- Oak Laurel wreath

== Personnel ==
RHKAAF personnel were a mixture of full-time and part-time staff. Most were locally recruited, in the latter years mostly local Hong Kongers. The ranks used were the same as those of the Royal Air Force, up to Air Commodore.

NATO code	OF-10	OF-9	OF-8	OF-7	OF-6	OF-5	OF-4	OF-3	OF-2	OF-1
Royal Hong Kong Auxiliary Air Force
Royal Hong Kong Auxiliary Air Force					Air commodore	Group captain	Wing commander	Squadron leader	Flight lieutenant	Flying officer		Pilot officer /acting pilot officer
Government Flying Service
Government Flying Service					Controller	Chief Pilot; Chief Aircraft Engineer	Senior Pilot; Senior Aircraft Engineer; Senior Aircrewman Officer	Pilot I Aircraft Engineer; Aircrewman Officer I	Pilot I Aircraft Engineer; Aircrewman Officer I	Pilot II; Aircraft Engineer; Aircrewman Officer II; Chief Aircraft Technician	Pilot II; Chief Aircraft Technician; Senior Aircraft Technician; Aircrewman Officer III	Cadet Pilot; Senior Aircraft Technician; Aircraft Technician; Aircrewman Officer III
Rank group	General / flag officers					Senior officers			Junior officers

Commanding officers

Start date	Name
1 May 1949	Sqn Ldr M.N. Oxford
1 October 1950	Wg Cdr A.W. Wood DFC BEM
1 January 1955	Wg Cdr J.E.L. Larsen, AFC
15 October 1955	Wg Cdr P.O. Scales, AE
12 October 1962	Wg Cdr G.J. Bell, OBE, AE & clasp
19 September 1966	Wg Cdr R.P. Smith, OBE, AE & clasp, JP, QCVSA
1 October 1971	Wg Cdr S.P.J. Ellis, AE
1 June 1975	Wg Cdr R.G. Penlington, OBE, AE & clasp
1 April 1983	Wg Cdr A.P. Asprey, OBE, AE, JP
1 January 1988	Wg Cdr R.W. Brooks, MBE, AE & clasp
1 January 1991	Wg Cdr P.D. Yip, MBE, AE & clasp, JP, QCVSA

== Fleet ==
On 31 March 1993, the RHKAAF fleet comprised:

=== Aircraft ===
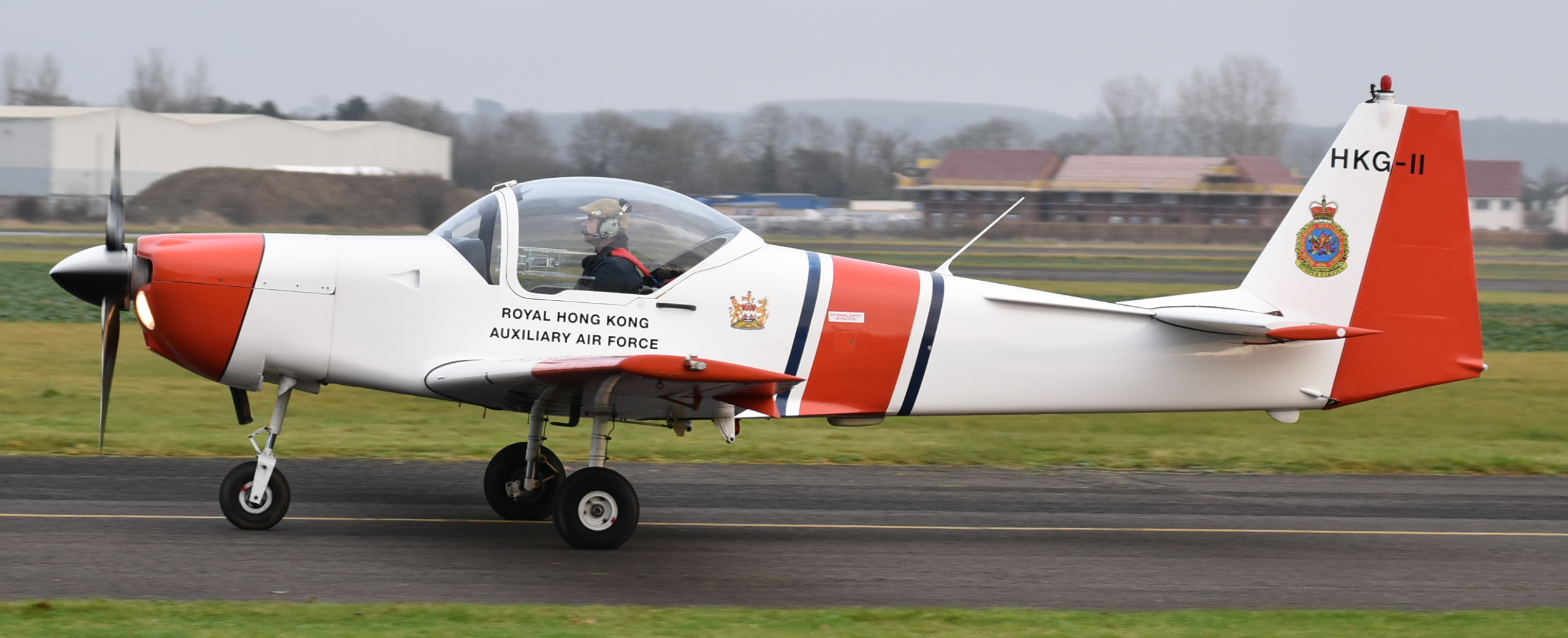
Slingsby T67 Firefly in the colours of the RHKAAF

Aircraft	Origin	Type	Variant	In service	Notes
Transport
Cessna 404	United States	transport / utility		1	
Super King Air	United States	patrol	200C	2	
Britten-Norman BN-2	United Kingdom	drug interdiction / utility		1	
Helicopters
Sikorsky S-76	United States	SAR / utility	A+/C	6 / 2	equipped with a FLIR
Sikorsky S-70	United States	utility	S-70A-27	2	transferred to the GFS in 1993
Aérospatiale SA 360	France	SAR / utility	365C	2	
Trainer
T67 Firefly	United Kingdom	basic trainer	M200	4	

=== Historical aircraft ===
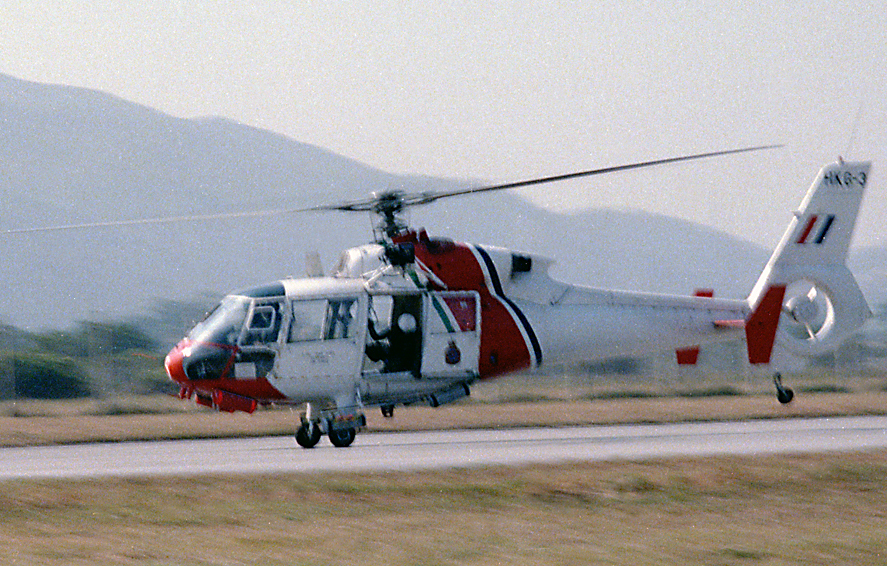
RHKAAF SA365C1 Dauphin at RAF Sek Kong in 1983

Aircraft	Origin	Type	Variant	In service	Notes
Combat Aircraft
Supermarine Spitfire	United Kingdom	fighter	Mk 24 / XVIII / XIX	16	2 Mk 19 variants were used for reconnaissance
Transport
Taylorcraft Auster	United Kingdom	utility	V / T7 / AOP6	1 / 5 / 4	in service from 1949 to 1971
Beechcraft Musketeer	United States	utility		2	in service from 1971 to 1979
Helicopters
Westland Widgeon	United Kingdom	utility		2	in service from 1958 to 1965
Aerospatiale Alouette III	France	utility		3	in service from 1965 to 1980
Trainers
BAe Bulldog	United Kingdom	training / patrol	Model 128	2	in service from 1977 to 1988
North American T-6	United States	trainer		11	transferred from Far East Air Force
