= Government Flying Service =

Disciplined service of the Hong Kong Government

Agency overview
- Formed: 1 April 1993; 33 years ago
- Preceding agency: Royal Hong Kong Auxiliary Air Force (RHKAAF)
- Jurisdiction: Hong Kong
- Headquarters: Hong Kong International Airport
- Motto: Semper Paratus; Always ready
- Employees: 335
- Annual budget: HKD 577.6 million (2016-17)
- Minister responsible: Chris Tang, Secretary for Security
- Agency executive: Captain West WU, Controller
- Parent department: Security Bureau
- Website: www.gfs.gov.hk

Government Flying Service
- Traditional Chinese: 香港政府飛行服務隊
- Simplified Chinese: 香港政府飞行服务队
Transcriptions
Standard Mandarin
- Hanyu Pinyin: Xianggang Zhèngfǔ Fēixíng Fúwù Duì
Yue: Cantonese
- Yale Romanization: Heung Gong Jing fú fēi hàahng fuhk mouh deuih
- Jyutping: Zing^{3} fu^{2} fei^{1} haang^{4} fuk^{6} mou^{6} deoi^{6}

The Hong Kong Government Flying Service (HKGFS) is a disciplined service and paramilitary flying organisation of the Government of Hong Kong.

The service has its head office in, and operates from, the southwestern end of Hong Kong International Airport at Chek Lap Kok. Before the opening of the Chek Lap Kok airport in 1998, it operated from the old Kai Tak Airport, the former Hong Kong International Airport. GFS patrols as far as 700-nautical-mile (1,300 km) to the south, to include the Hong Kong Flight Information Region and the Hong Kong Maritime Rescue Coordination Centre area of responsibility, which covers most of the South China Sea basin.

== History ==
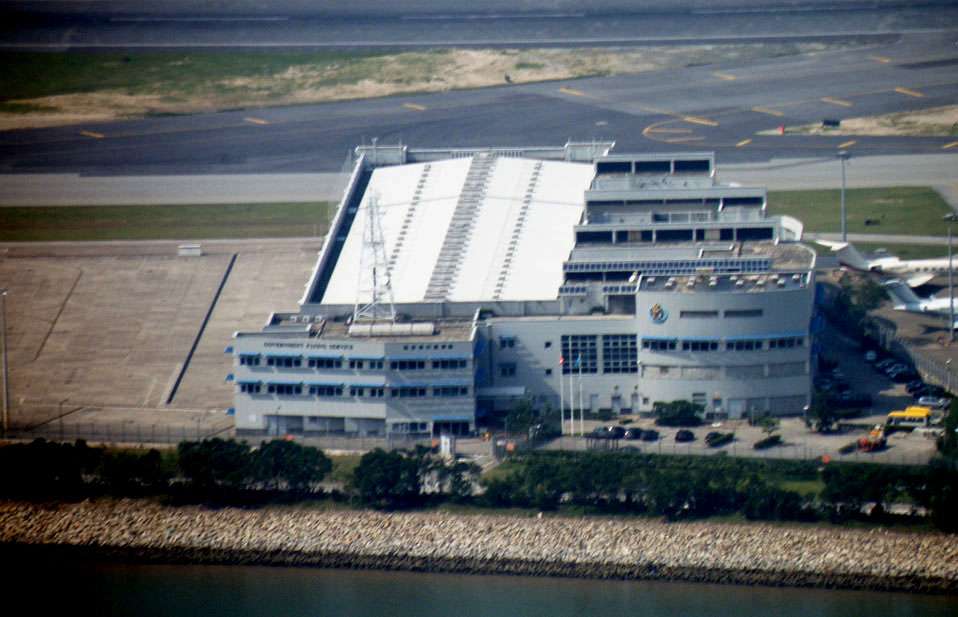
GFS headquarters at the Hong Kong International Airport

The Government Flying Service was established on 1 April 1993, when Hong Kong was under British rule. It then took over all the non-military operations of the Royal Hong Kong Auxiliary Air Force (RHKAAF), which was an auxiliary unit of the United Kingdom Royal Air Force. After Hong Kong was handed over to the People's Republic of China in 1997, the GFS remained as a government unit of the Hong Kong Special Administrative Region, and is responsible for search and rescue (SAR), air ambulance, firefighting, and police operations.

Starting in 2012, the GFS operates from the HKCEC heliport, adjacent to Golden Bauhinia Square. The site is also open to commercial traffic.

In August 2020, a GFS Bombardier Challenger 605 maritime patrol aircraft was believed to have assisted Chinese authorities in intercepting 12 Hong Kongers who were attempting to flee to Taiwan due to increasingly onerous conditions in Hong Kong and enhanced exit controls. The Hong Kong government denied that they had cooperated with Chinese authorities. On 21 December 2020, the United States Bureau of Industry and Security amended the Export Administration Regulations by adding a new 'Military End User' (MEU) List, as well as the first tranche of 103 entities, which includes 58 Chinese and 45 Russian companies. Government Flying Service was added as one of 103 entities to the MEU List.

In 2022, a new site at the southernmost corner of the former Kai Tak airport was opened, featuring one landing/takeoff pad, two parking pads, one repair hangar for the new Airbus H175 helicopter and an operations/office building. The site had been earmarked since 2007 and planning permission was given in 2017 as part of the area's redevelopment, as well as limitations of new high rise buildings in the Tung Chung area near the existing base affecting marginal weather operations. The possibility of opening the base to commercial cross-boundary traffic has been raised since 2011.

== Operations ==
GFS consists of five divisions:

- Operations Division – all emergency response and operational matters (i.e. search and rescue)
- Training and Standards Division – professional standards and development
- Corporate Safety Division - safety-related initiatives and cross-section safety management matters
- Engineering Division – maintenance of GFS aircraft and ground-support equipment in accordance with the Civil Aviation Department standards
- Administration Division – general administration, personnel support services

Helicopters can land on five highways in Hong Kong to attend to road related recovery operations. For long-range search and rescue operations, the GFS initially use fixed wing aircraft which then guide helicopters to the location.

- Air ambulance service response time (type A+/A) – 20 minutes (within island zone) / 30 minutes (outside island zone)
- Search and rescue callout time 0700-2159 -(within 50 nm/92.5 km of GFS HQ) – 1hr / 1hr 40m (with additional/specialized equipment)
- Search and rescue callout time 2200-0659 -(within 50 nm/92.5 km of GFS HQ) – 2hr
- For SARs outside 50 nm / 92.5 km – add 30mins per 50 nm
- Fixed Winged Aircraft 0700-2159 – (within 50 nm/92.5 km of GFS)- 50m, (between 50 nm/92.5 km to 100 nm/185 km of GFS)- 1hr 5m, (beyond 100 nm/185 km of GFS)- add 15m per 50 nm.

The GFS operates primarily from Chek Lap Kok airport, where headquarters and all fixed wing aviation is based. Some helicopters are based in the Kai Tak division and a helipad is available in Wan Chai next to the HKCEC.

=== Current inventory ===
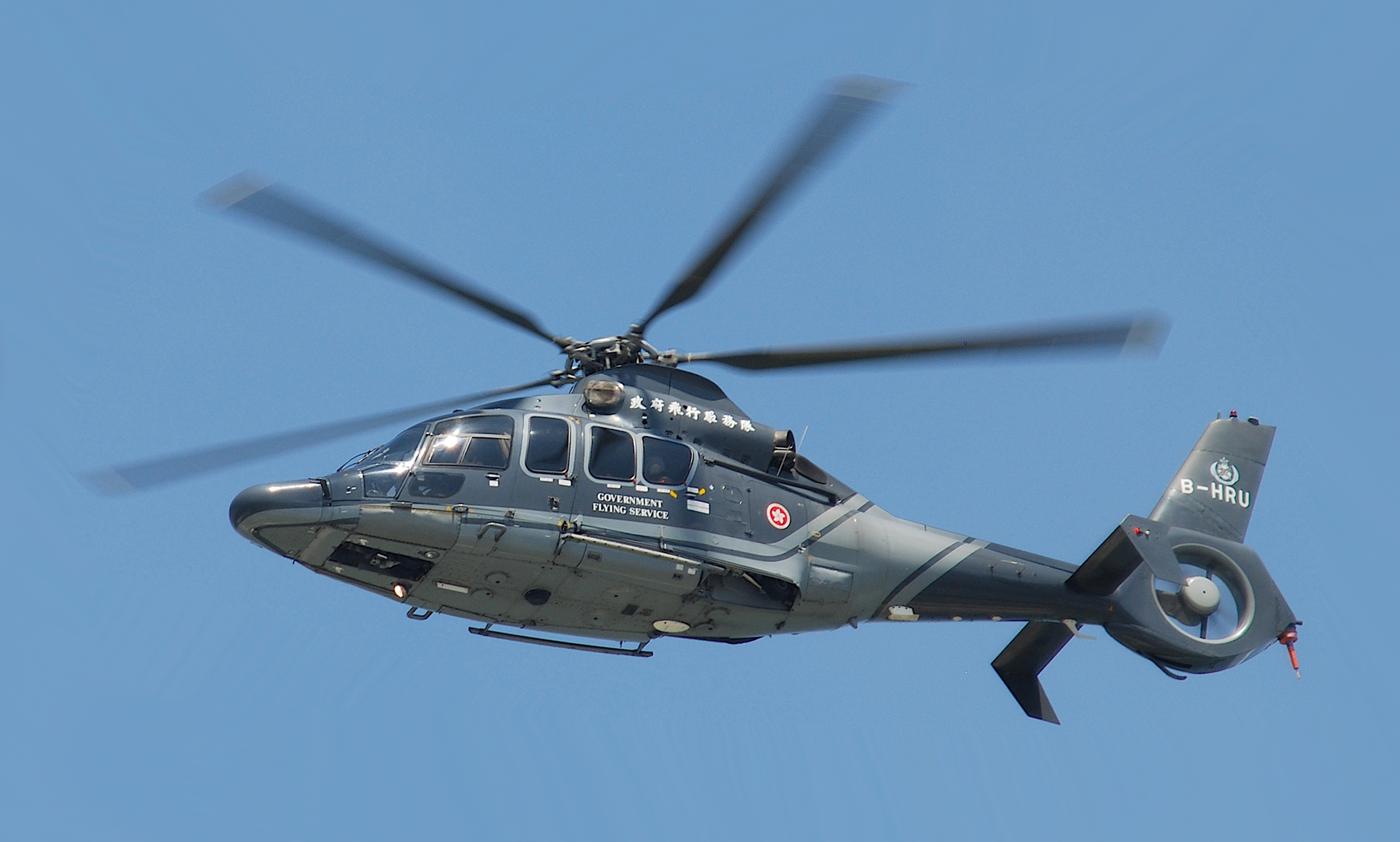
A GFS Eurocopter EC155 in flight

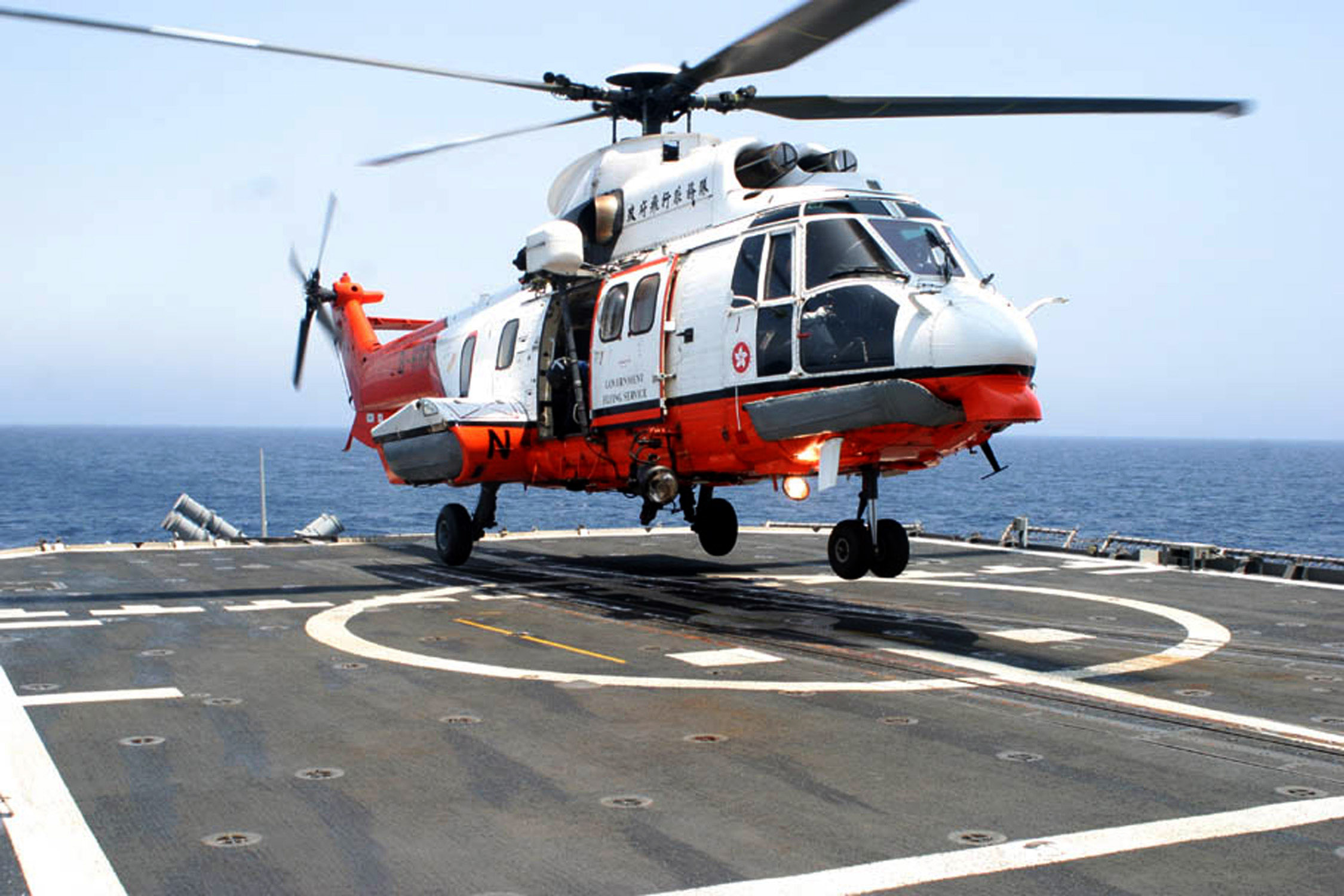
A GFS Super Puma landing on the deck of the USS Mobile Bay, April 2006

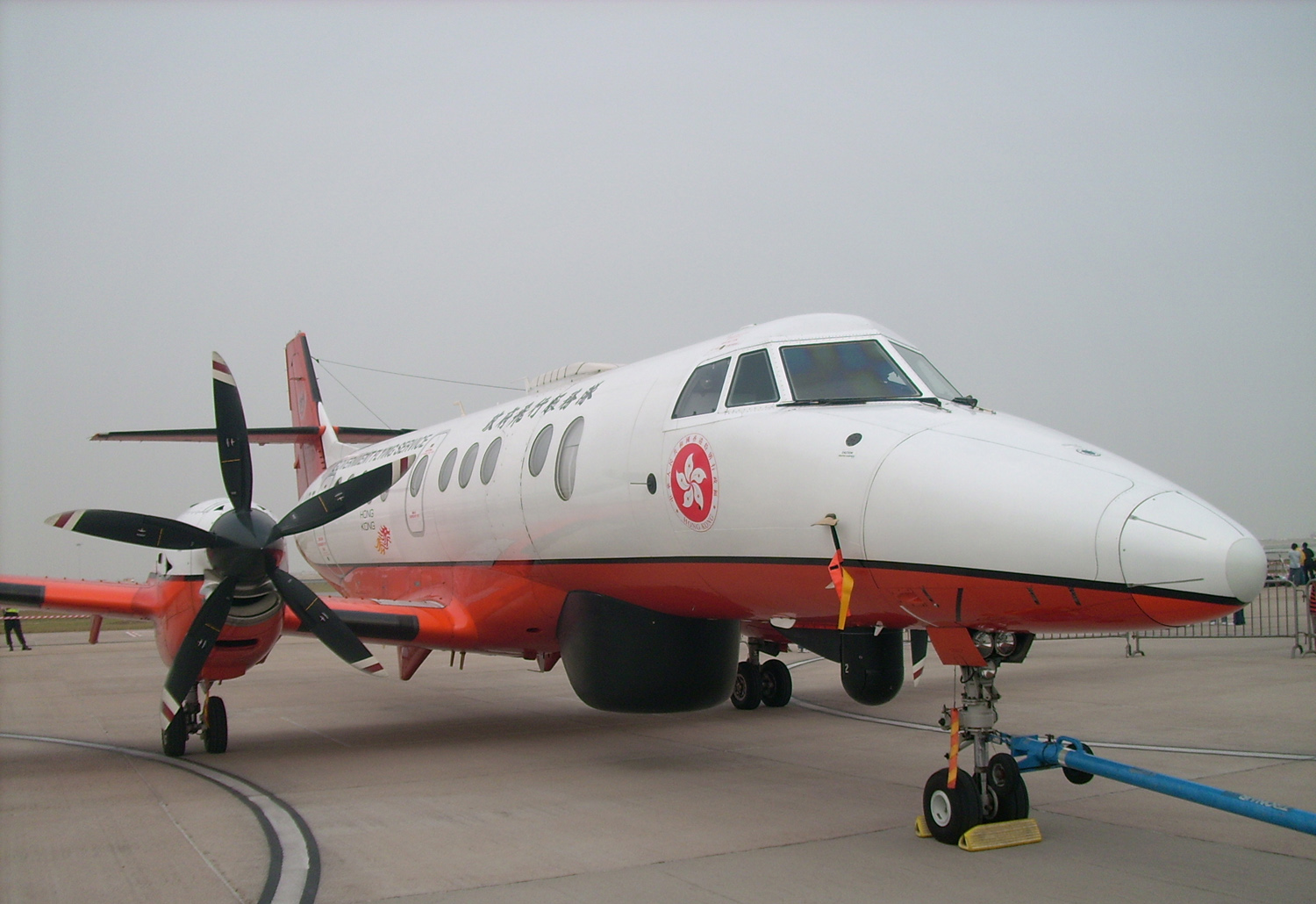
A former GFS Jetstream 41

Aircraft	Origin	Type	Variant	In service	Notes
Aeroplane
Bombardier Challenger CL605	Canada	surveillance / SAR	CL-605	2	
Diamond DA42	Austria	surveillance / patrol	DA42 NG	1	
Helicopters
Airbus H175	France	SAR / utility		7	
Eurocopter EC155	France / Germany	SAR / air ambulance		4	

== Equipment and gear ==
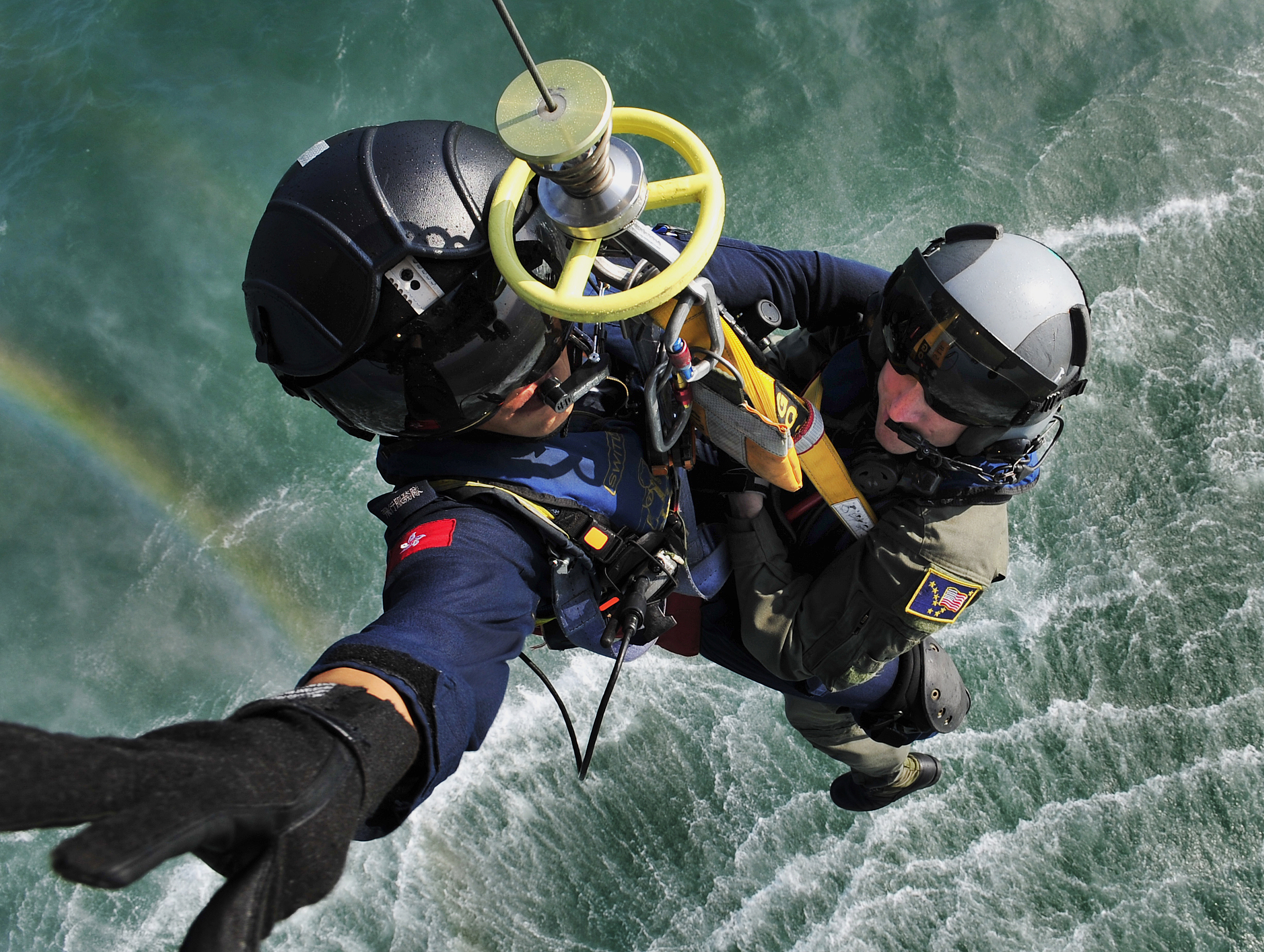
A GFS lieutenant and a US Air National Guard technical sergeant practice seaborne hoisting

Standard equipment for GFS personnel is:

- Flight suit or jumpsuit
- Special operations vests (SOVs) – consists of a small oxygen tank (3 minutes of oxygen), life jacket, small survival/first aid kit.
- Helicopter helmet
- Walkie-talkie
- SABRE 7 (BE549) personal locator beacon
- Gloves

== Personnel ==
GFS employs 335 personnel:

- 235 commissioned/disciplined personnel
- 100 civilian personnel

Most of the pilots in the GFS were localised prior to the handover in 1997, as former RAF and other British military personnel departed Hong Kong.

The GFS is led by a Controller, who reports to the Secretary for Security. The current Controller is Captain West WH WU.

Other senior officers of the GFS are:

- Departmental Secretary
- Chief Pilot (Operations)
- Chief Pilot (Training and Standards)
- Chief Pilot (Corporate Safety)
- Chief Aircraft Engineer

Medical doctors and nurses also serve in the GFS under the 'GFS Air Medical Officer Programme'.

== Uniform ==
Operations uniforms:

- green jumpsuit or separate flight jacket and pants - pilot and aircrew
- blue jumpsuit or separate Flight jacket and pants - mechanics and engineers

Dress uniforms:

- light blue shirt (short sleeve for summer and long sleeve for winter) with dark tie dress jacket and pants
- dark skirts for women
- sweaters for men
- dark windbreaker jacket for summer
- Peaked cap - male and female variations

== Rank ==
Prior to the creation of the GFS, the ranks within the Royal Hong Kong Auxiliary Air Force were the same as the RAF. The late 1980s and early 1990s saw the transition to local staff in the RHKAAF in preparation for the civil transfer to the GFS role.

Ranking of personnel of the GFS are civilian aviation roles and are as follows:

Rank group	General / flag officers	Senior officers			Junior officers
Government Flying Service
Government Flying Service	Controller	Chief Pilot; Chief Aircraft Engineer	Senior Pilot; Senior Aircraft Engineer; Senior Aircrewman Officer	Pilot I Aircraft Engineer; Aircrewman Officer I	Pilot I Aircraft Engineer; Aircrewman Officer I	Pilot II; Aircraft Engineer; Aircrewman Officer II; Chief Aircraft Technician	Pilot II; Chief Aircraft Technician; Senior Aircraft Technician; Aircrewman Officer III	Cadet Pilot; Senior Aircraft Technician; Aircraft Technician; Aircrewman Officer III

Pilot II and Cadet Pilot ranks were created in the 1990s for local pilots with less flying experience.

== Controllers ==
List of past controllers of the GFS:

- Captain Brian Cluer - former RAF fighter pilot and General Manager of Operations, Cathay Pacific
- Captain Brian Butt Yiu-ming - formerly with Royal Hong Kong Auxiliary Air Force and Chief Inspector with Hong Kong Police specializing in the counterfeit detection

== Crest ==
The current crest of the force was adopted in 1997, prior to which the Hong Kong Coat of Arms was used on GFS aircraft. The current is topped with the Hong Kong Bauhinia flower. In the centre of the crest is a navy blue (sometimes purple) and light blue roundel background. In the middle of the crest is a four bladed propeller, and a Chinese dragon in the front (similar to the RHKAAF crest). Along the bottom of the roundel are the letters GFS representing the English name of the service. Underneath the roundel are a pair of wings joined by a ribbon with the Chinese characters "政府飛行服務隊", the Chinese name of the service.

== GFS in the media ==
- The service's official theme song, Wishing You Well So Much (多想你好), was sung by Andy Lau in 2003.
- The TVB drama "Always Ready" was filmed inside GFS HQ in 2005 and starred Ekin Cheng.

== Incidents ==
- 26 August 2003 – A Eurocopter EC 155 B1 crashed on a hill at Pak Kung Au near Tung Chung on Lantau Island killing two aircrew (Pilot Pang Fu-kwok and Airman Chan Man-tik).
- 27 December 2010 – One of the GFS's Eurocopter Super Puma Mk II helicopters (B-HRN) ditched in Shing Mun Reservoir after the loss of its number 2 engine. It was in the process of collecting water from the reservoir to drop on a hill fire. None of the three crew members were injured. The Civil Aviation Department said on the following day it had retrieved the flight data recorder. Pending a final report, an interim bulletin issued in February 2012 reported that the number 2 engine was correctly shut down automatically by the engine control unit because the turbine had begun to overspeed, because there appeared to be no fault in the turbine or the fuel systems the overspeed was possibly the result of a disconnection of the engine from the main gearbox because of wear to the freewheel unit that connected the two. The Helicopter was rebuilt by the engineering team after it was recovered from the reservoir.

== See also ==
- Royal Hong Kong Auxiliary Air Force
