= Third officer =

Third officer may refer to:

- Third officer (aviation), a rarely used rank in civil aviation companies
- Third mate, a merchant marine rank
- A rank in the Women's Royal Naval Service corresponding to sub-lieutenant in the Royal Navy
- A rank in the Air Transport Auxiliary corresponding to pilot officer in the Royal Air Force
- The third-highest rank in some pre-war British fire brigades
