= Slingsby T67 Firefly =

Aerobatic training aircraft

RF-6, T67 Firefly
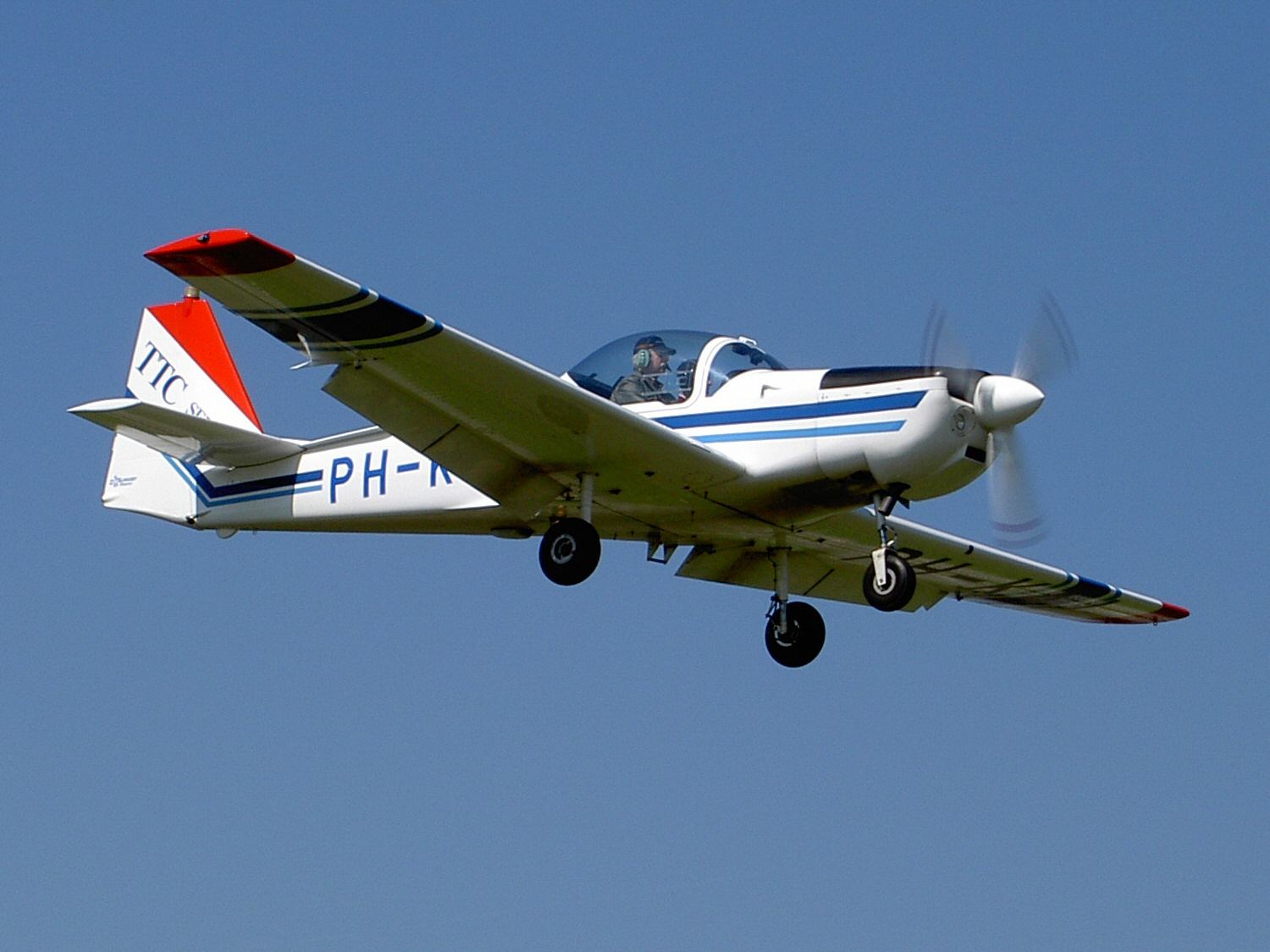
- Slingsby T67M260 Firefly

General information
- Type: Trainer/tourer/sport aircraft
- Manufacturer: Fournier; Slingsby Aviation
- Status: Limited Service
- Primary users: Royal Jordanian Air Force Bahrain Air Force
- Number built: > 250

History
- Manufactured: 1974–1995
- First flight: 12 March 1974
- Developed into: Sportavia RS-180

The Slingsby T67 Firefly, originally produced as the Fournier RF-6, is a two-seat aerobatic training aircraft, built by Slingsby Aviation in Kirkbymoorside, Yorkshire, England.

It has been used as a trainer aircraft by several armed forces, as well as civilian operators. In the mid-1990s, the aircraft became controversial in the United States after three fatal accidents during US Air Force training operations. The Firefly has poor spin recovery, and has been involved in at least 36 fatal accidents.

== Development ==
The RF-6 was designed by René Fournier, and first flew on 12 March 1974. An all-wooden construction, it featured a high aspect-ratio wing echoing his earlier motorglider designs. Fournier set up his own factory at Nitray, near Tours to manufacture the design, but after only around 40 had been built, the exercise proved financially unviable, and he was forced to close down production. A four-seat version was under development by Sportavia-Pützer as the RF-6C, but this demonstrated serious stability problems that eventually led to an almost complete redesign as the Sportavia-Pützer RS 180 Sportsman.

In 1981, Fournier sold the development rights of the RF-6B to Slingsby Aviation, which renamed it the T67. The earliest examples, the T67A, were virtually identical to the Fournier-built aircraft, but the design was soon revised to replace the wooden structure with one of composite material. Slingsby produced several versions developing the airframe and adding progressively larger engines. The Slingsby T67M, aimed at the military (hence "M") training market, was the first to include a constant-speed propeller and inverted fuel and oil systems. Over 250 aircraft have been built, mainly the T67M260 and closely related T-3A variants.

== Operational history ==
The largest Firefly operator was the United States Air Force, where it was given the designation T-3A Firefly. The Firefly was selected in 1992 to replace the T-41 aircraft for the command's Enhanced Flight Screening Program, which would include aerobatic maneuvers. From 1993 to 1995, 113 aircraft were purchased and delivered to Hondo Municipal Airport in Texas, and the U.S. Air Force Academy in Colorado. The type was meant to not only replace the Cessna T-41 introductory trainer, but also to meet the Enhanced Flight Screening Program (EFSP) requirements. The Commander of the Air Education and Training Command stood down the entire T-3A fleet in July 1997 as a result of uncommanded engine stoppages during flight and ground operations. A major factor driving the decision were the three T-3A Class A mishaps. Three Air Force Academy cadets and three instructors were killed in these T-3A mishaps. The US Air Force has no replacement for this type, as it no longer provides training to non-fliers. The aircraft were eventually declared in excess of need in the early 2000s and disposed of by scrapping in 2006.

The Royal Air Force used 22 Slingsby T67M260s as their basic trainer between 1995 and 2010. Over 100,000 flight hours were flown out of RAF Barkston Heath by Army, Royal Navy and Royal Marines students, and at RAF Church Fenton with RAF and foreign students.

The Firefly has also been used by the Royal Hong Kong Auxiliary Air Force, and the Royal Jordanian Air Force (still currently used).

The Firefly was used in Britain for basic aerobatic training in the 2000s. In December 2012, the National Flying Laboratory Centre at Cranfield University in the UK acquired a T67M260 to supplement its Scottish Aviation Bulldog aerobatic trainer for MSc student flight experience and training. As of 2019 the Firefly is used in UPRT courses.

== Variants ==
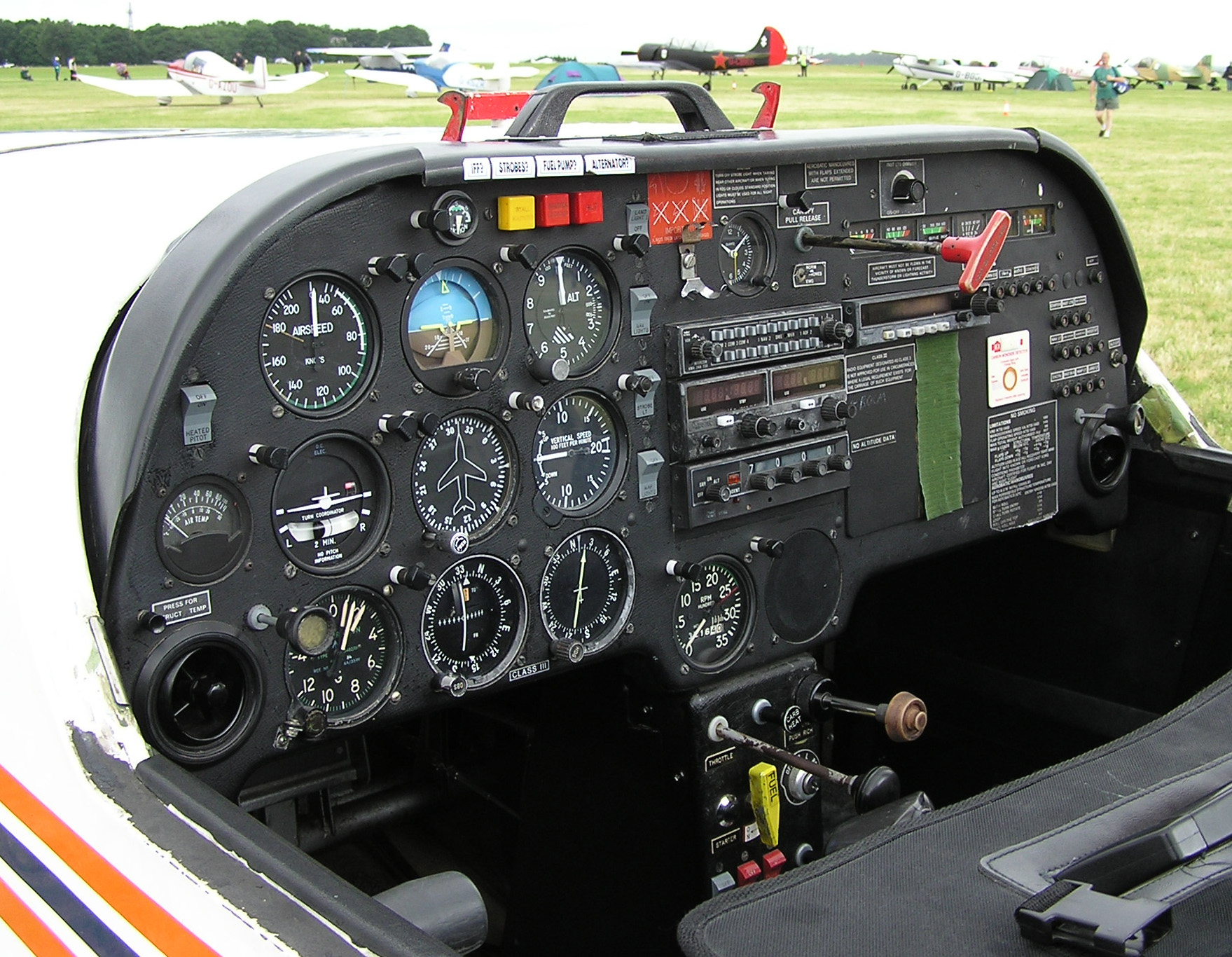
Slingsby Firefly T67C cockpit

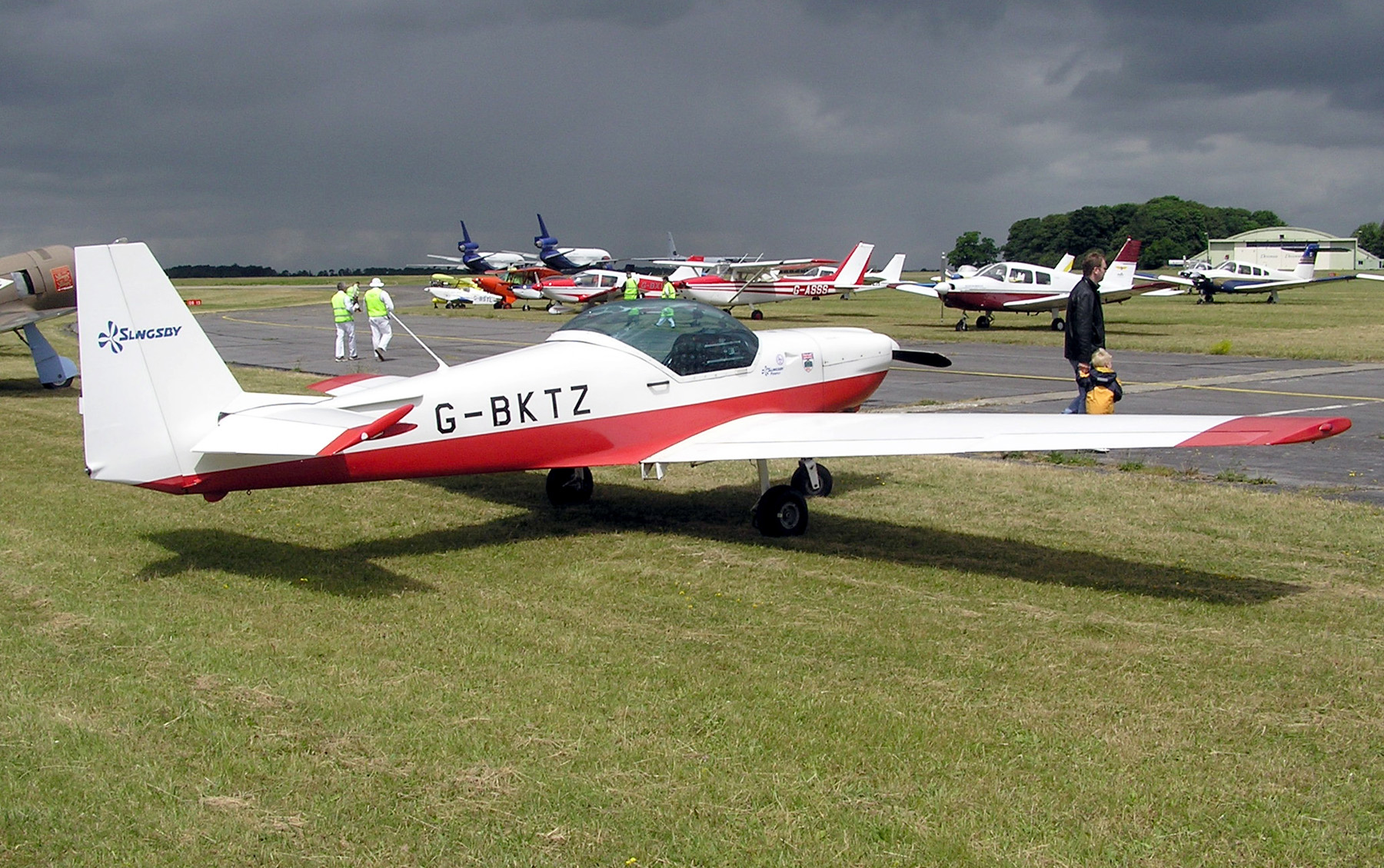
Slingsby T67M Firefly

RF-6B
Main Fournier production series with Rolls-Royce-built Continental O-200 100 hp (75 kW) engine (43 built)

RF-6B/120
RF-6B with Lycoming O-235 120 hp (89 kW) engine, one built

RF-6C
Four-seat version of RF-6B built by Sportavia with Lycoming O-320 engine, four built, developed into Sportavia RS-180

T67A
Slingsby-built RF-6B/120 certified on 1 October 1981, O-235 118hp engine, wooden construction, 2 blade fixed prop, fuel in firewall tank, single piece canopy, ten built

T67M Firefly
First flown on 5 December 1982 and certified on 2 August 1983, the T67M was developed from the T67A as a glass-reinforced plastic aircraft for a role as a military trainer. The T67M has a 160 hp (120 kW) fuel-injected Lycoming AEIO320-D1B and a two-blade Hoffman HO-V72L-V/180CB constant-speed propeller, single piece canopy, fuel in firewall tank. The fuel-injected engine with inverted fuel and oil systems allowed the aircraft to perform sustained negative-G (inverted) aerobatics, although inverted spins were never formally approved. A total of 32 T67Ms (including the later T67M MkII) were produced.

T67B
First flown on 16 April 1981 and certified on 18 September 1984, the T67B was effectively the T67A made, like the T67M, in glassfibre reinforced plastic, but without the up-rated engine and propeller. O-235 118hp engine, 2 blade fixed prop, fuel in firewall tank, single piece canopy. A total of 14 T67Bs were produced.

T67M MkII Firefly
Certified on 20 December 1985, AEIO-320 fuel injected 160hp engine, 2 blade constant speed prop, inverted fuel and oil systems. The T67M MkII replaced the single-piece canopy of the T67M with a two-piece design, and the single fuselage fuel tank with two, larger tanks in the wings.

T67M200 Firefly
Certified on 19 June 1987, the T67M200 had a more powerful 200 hp (149 kW) Lycoming AEIO360-A1E with a three-bladed Hoffman propeller, inverted fuel and oil systems. A total of 26 T67M-200s were produced.

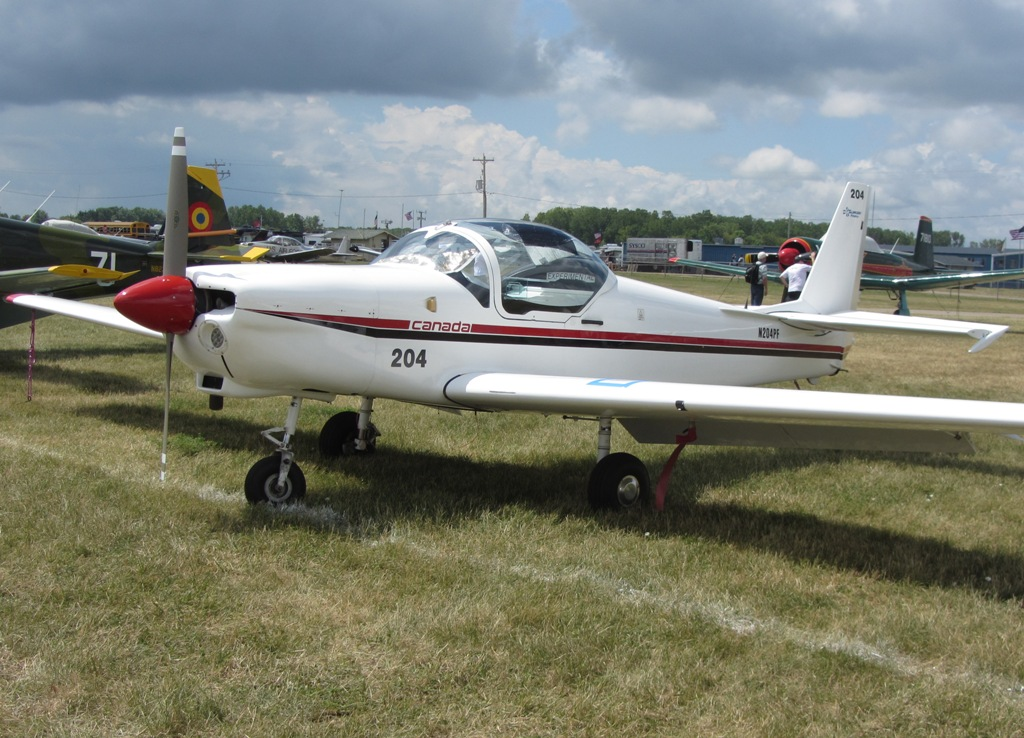
T67C Firefly

T67C Firefly
Certified on 15 December 1987, the T67C was the last of the "civilian" variants, based on the T67B with an uprated 160 hp (120 kW) Lycoming O-320 engine, but without fuel injection and inverted-flight systems found on the T67M variants. Two blade constant speed prop. Two further sub-versions of the T67C copied the two-piece canopy (T67C-2) and wing tanks (T67C-3, sometimes known as the T67D) from the T67M MkII. A total of 28 T67Cs were produced across the three versions.

T67M260 Firefly

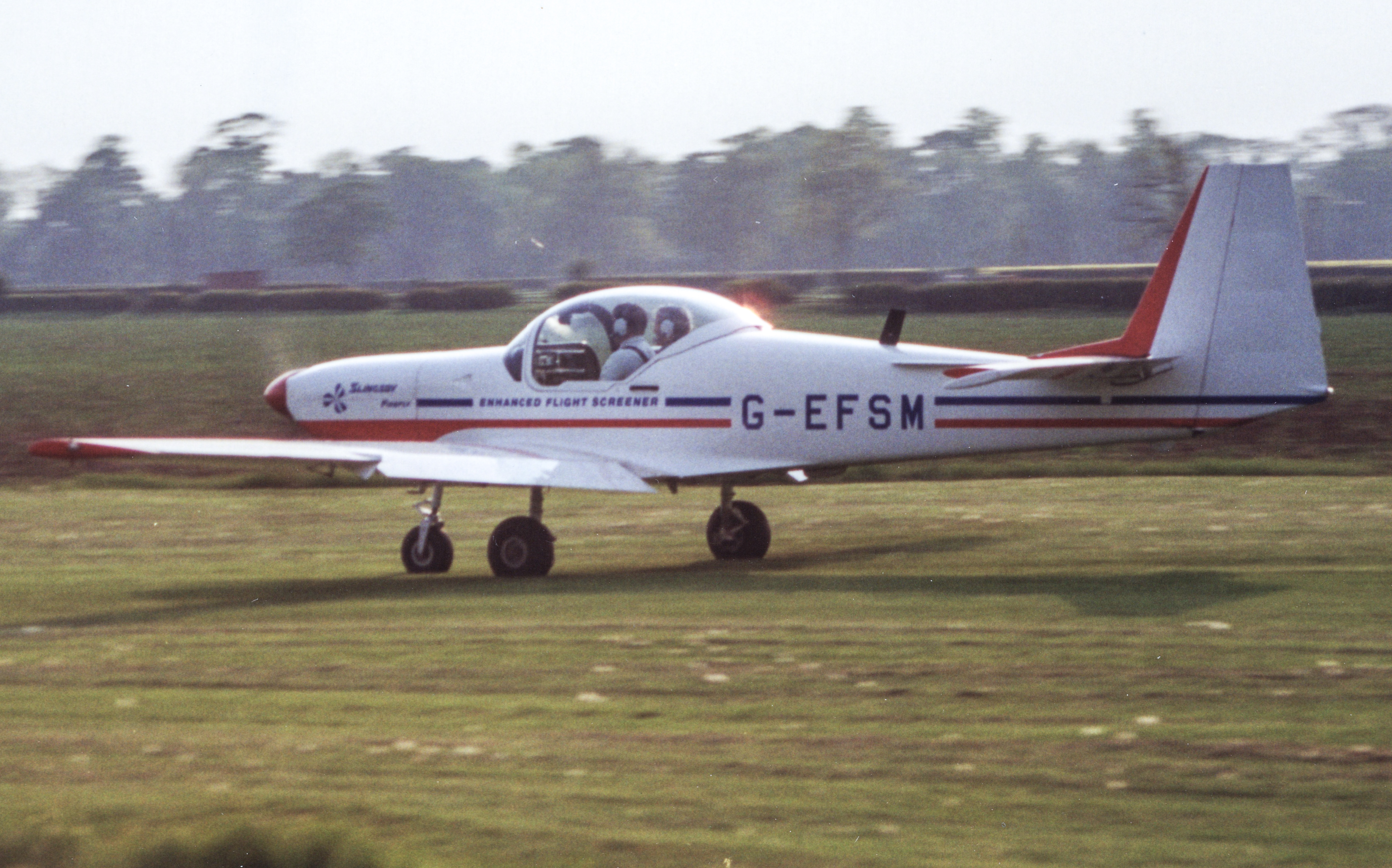
Slingsby T67M260 Firefly prototype

Certified on 11 November 1993, the T67M260 added even more power with the six-cylinder 260 hp (190 kW) Lycoming AEIO540-D4A5 engine, three blade constant speed prop. Unusually for side-by-side light aircraft, the T67M260 was built to be flown solo from the right-hand seat to allow student pilots to immediately get used to the left-hand throttle found in most military aircraft – earlier models of the T67M had a second throttle on the left-hand sidewall of the cabin. A total of 51 T67M-260s were produced. They were used to successfully train hundreds of RAF, RN, British Army, and foreign and Commonwealth pilots through Joint Elementary Flying Training School until late 2010.

T67M260-T3A Firefly

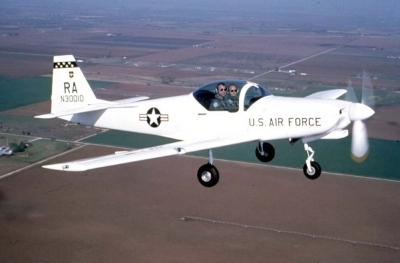
T-3A Firefly

Certified on 15 December 1993, the last military version of the T67 family was the T67M260-T3A, of which the entire production run of 114 was purchased by the United States Air Force, where it was known as the T-3A. The T-3A was basically the T67M260 with the addition of air conditioning. Although the US media claimed the aircraft was to blame after four aircraft were destroyed in accidents, no engine stoppages or vapour-lock problems with the fuel system were found during very thorough tests at Edwards AFB. All three instructors killed in the accidents came from the C-141, a large-transport aircraft. Their only prior aerobatic experience was in Air Force pilot training in the T-37 and T-38 jet trainers. This, combined with lower air density at the higher altitude of the Academy airfield and training areas, meant spin recovery was delayed and/or improper spin prevent/recovery techniques were used. Parachutes were not worn on the first fatal accident but were worn on the second and third fatal accidents. Both of these accidents were caused by low altitude spins. Following the three fatal accidents and an engine failure in the Academy landing pattern the fleet was grounded in 1997 and stored without maintenance until being destroyed in 2006.

CT-111 Firefly
Designation by the Canadian Forces internally only as aircraft are registered as civilian aircraft

== Operators ==
=== Military operators ===
Bahrain

- Bahrain Air Force operates three T67M-260

Jordan

- Royal Jordanian Air Force- 14 × T67M-260

Netherlands

- Dutch pilot selection centre:

The Firefly is used by the Royal Netherlands Air Force during pilot selection which is contracted out to TTC at Seppe Airport.

=== Former military operators ===
Belize

- Belize Defence Force Air Wing – 1 x T67M-260 delivered in 1996. Following retirement by the Belize Defence Force, the aircraft was sold into civilian ownership. It is currently operating under the registration N964SM in the United States

Canada

- Canadian Forces

The T67C Firefly was used as a basic military training aircraft in Canada locally designated as the CT-111 Firefly. The Canadian Fireflies entered service in 1992 replacing the CT 134 Musketeer. They were, in turn, replaced in 2006 by the German-made Grob G-120 when the contract ended. The aircraft were owned and operated by Bombardier Aerospace under contract to the Canadian Forces.

Hong Kong

- Royal Hong Kong Auxiliary Air Force

United Kingdom

- Royal Air Force, Royal Navy, British Army

The Firefly was used as a basic military trainer in the United Kingdom until spring 2010, when they were replaced by Grob Tutor aircraft. The aircraft are owned and operated under contract by a civilian company on behalf of the military. In the UK, it was under a scheme known as "Contractor Owned Contractor Operated" (CoCo).

United States

- United States Air Force

=== Civil operators ===
/ Hong Kong

- Royal Hong Kong Auxiliary Air Force / Hong Kong Government Flying Service – retired all four T67-M200 aircraft after 1996
- Hong Kong Aviation Club – used for pilot aerobatics training

New Zealand

- Auckland Aero Club – one T67B – used for pilot aerobatics training and high-visibility scenic flight.
- North Shore Aero Club – one T67-M200 – used for pilot aerobatics training.

Spain

- FTEJerez – one T67M Mk.II – used to provide upset training to graduates

Turkey

- Turkish Aeronautical Association (Türk Hava Kurumu) – used to give basic flight training to ATPL trainees (T67-M200)

United Kingdom

- Swift Aircraft purchased 22 former RAF training Slingsby T67-M260 aircraft from Babcock Defence Services in June 2011, to be offered for sale or lease.
- Cranfield University operates one T67 to provide flight initiations for aerospace engineers.
- Leading Edge Aviation operates one ex Royal Hong Kong Auxiliary Air Force T67 to operate A-UPRT flights for its student pilots.
- Ultimate High operates a fleet of three T67-M260 aircraft for UPRT training, formation training and experience flights.
- Cubair Flight Training has access to one T67M Mk.II for aerobatics ratings and instrument flight training.
- CRM Aviation use 6 T67M Mk.II aircraft for formation training.
- Flight Performance Training use 3 T67M Mk.II aircraft for UPRT flights.
- RAF Benson Flying Club operates 2 T67C and one T67M Mk.II aircraft for ab-initio private pilot training for eligible Armed Forces personnel.
- Skyborne Airline Academy use one T67-M200 (G-SAUP) for UPRT training at their UK base in Gloucestershire.
- Stapleford Flight Centre use one T67-M260 (G-BYOB) to operate A-UPRT flights for its student pilots.

== Specifications (T-3A) ==
Data from Brassey's World Aircraft & Systems Directory.

General characteristics

- Crew: 2
- Length: 24 ft 10 in (7.55 m)
- Wingspan: 34 ft 9 in (10.69 m)
- Height: 7 ft 9 in (2.36 m)
- Wing area: 136 sq ft (12.6 m^{2})
- Airfoil: NACA 23015/23013 (root/tip)
- Empty weight: 1,750 lb (794 kg)
- Max takeoff weight: 2,550 lb (1,157 kg)
- Powerplant: 1 × Textron Lycoming AEIO-540-D 6-cylinder horizontally-opposed engine, 260 hp (194 kW)

Performance

- Maximum speed: 152 kn (175 mph, 281 km/h)
- Cruise speed: 140 kn (161 mph, 259 km/h)
- Stall speed: 54 kn (62 mph, 100 km/h) (with flaps)
- Never exceed speed: 195 kn (224 mph, 361 km/h)
- Range: 407 nmi (468 mi, 753 km)
- Service ceiling: 19,000 ft (5,790 m)
- Rate of climb: 1,380 ft/min (7.0 m/s)
- Wing loading: 18.8 lb/sq ft (92 kg/m^{2})
- Power/mass: 0.10 hp/lb (0.17 kW/kg)

== See also ==
Aircraft of comparable role, configuration, and era

- PAC CT/4 (Pacific Aerospace Limited)
- Cessna T-41 Mescalero
