= Aircrew =

Personnel who operate an aircraft while in flight

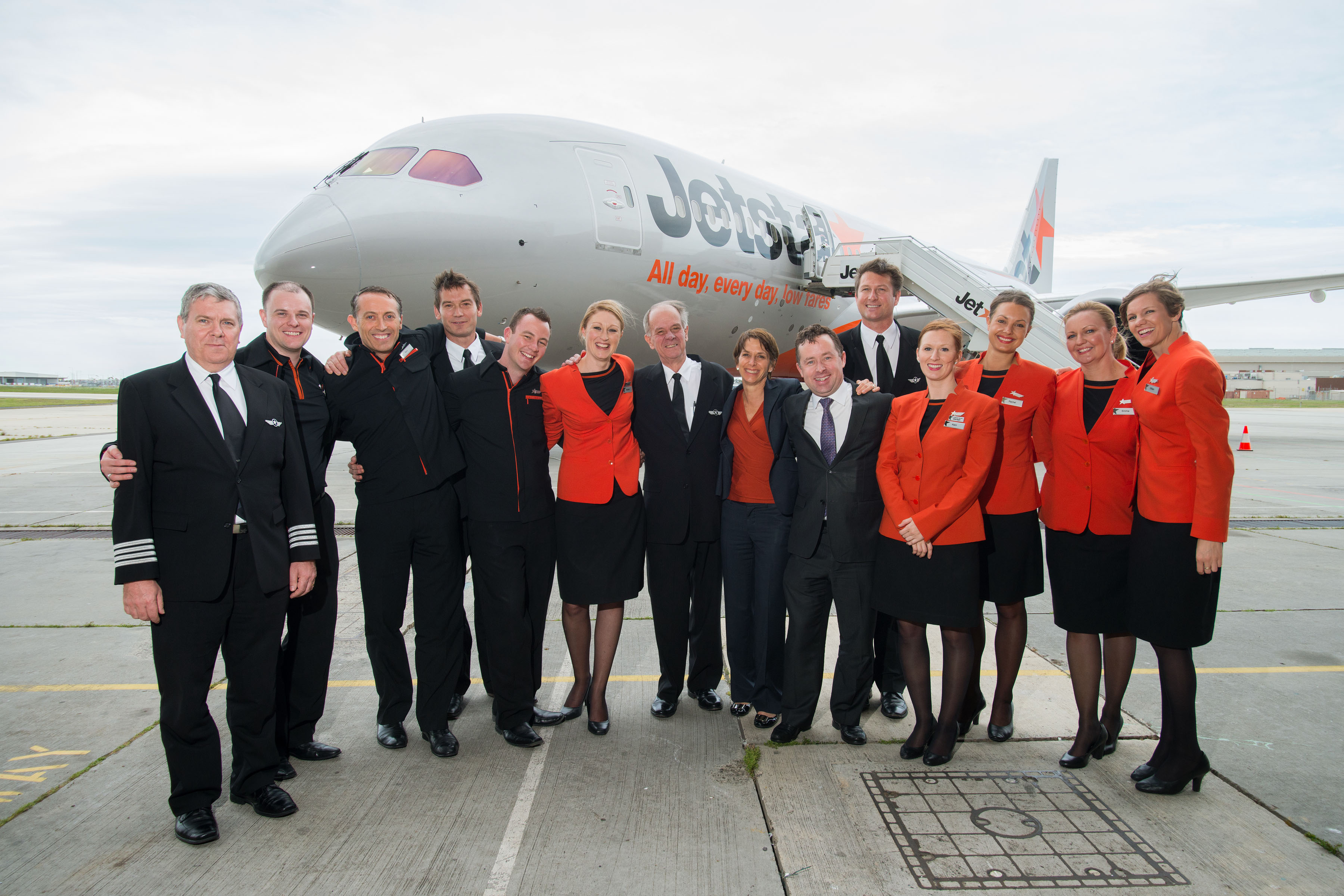
The aircrew of a Jetstar Airways Boeing 787

Aircrew are personnel who operate an aircraft while in flight. The composition of a flight's crew depends on the type of aircraft, plus the flight's duration and purpose. Air crew consist of Flight Crew and Cabin Crew.

== Commercial aviation ==
=== Flight crew positions ===
In commercial aviation, the crew responsible for operating and controlling the aircraft are called flight crew. Some flight crew position names are derived from nautical terms and indicate a rank or command structure similar to that on ocean-going vessels, allowing for quick executive decision making during normal operations or emergency situations. Historical flightdeck positions include:

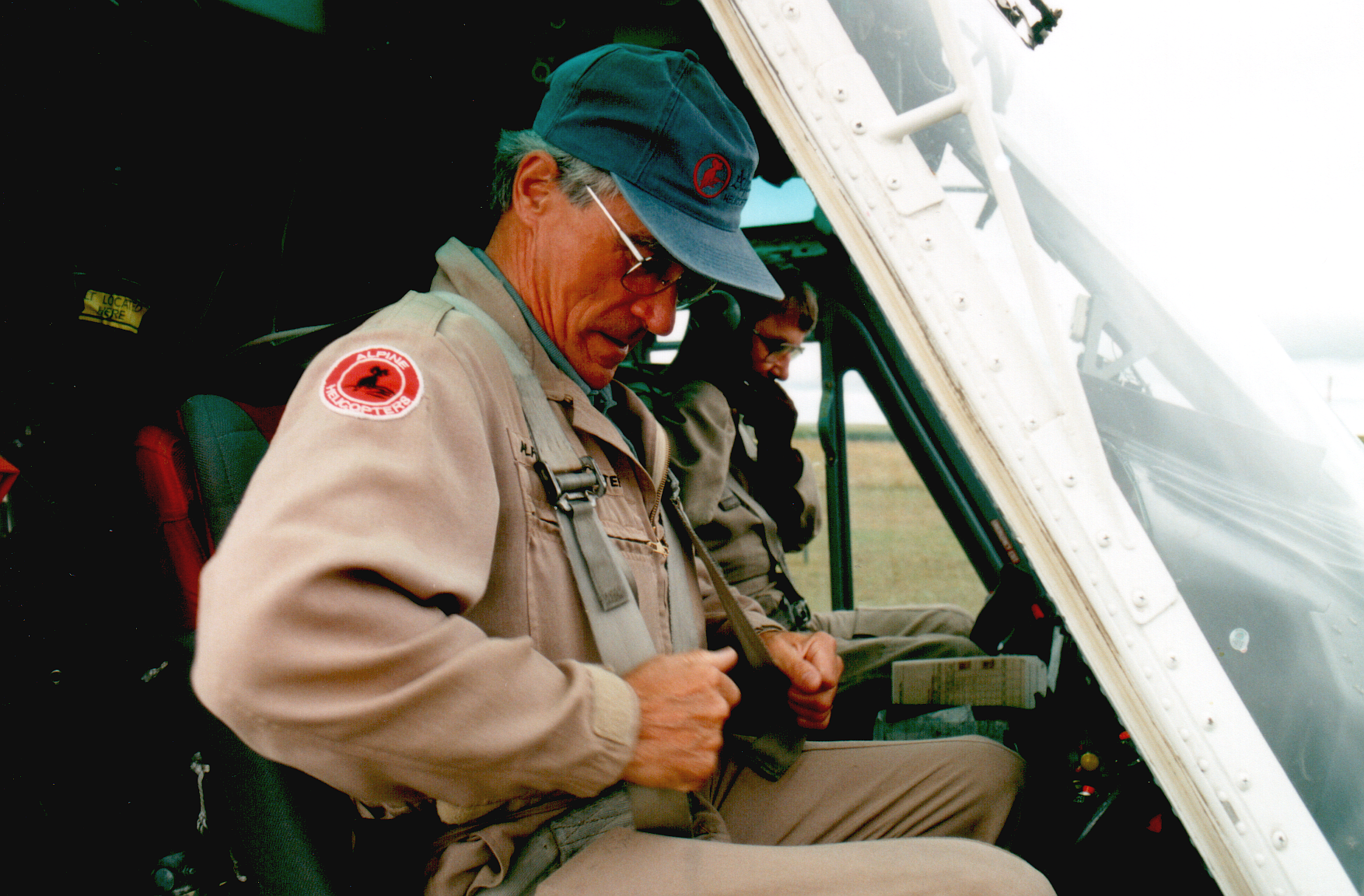
Bell 212 aircrew from Alpine Helicopters scramble on a medical evacuation mission.

- Captain, the pilot Pilot-in-Command and highest-ranking member or members of a flight crew.
- First officer (FO, also called a co-pilot), another pilot who is normally seated to the right of the captain. (On helicopters, an FO is normally seated to the left of the captain, who occupies the right-hand seat.)
- Second officer (SO), a person lower in rank to the first officer, and who typically performs selected duties and also acts as a relief pilot. The rank of second officer was traditionally a flight engineer, who was often the person who handled the engine controls. In the 21st century, second officers on some airlines are pilots who act as "cruise relief" on long haul flights.
- Third officer (TO), a person lower in rank to a second officer, and who typically performs selected duties and can also act as a relief pilot. Largely redundant in the present day.
- Relief crew members in the present day are fully licensed and trained captains and first officers who accompany long-haul airline flights, and who relieve the primary pilots during designated times from the commercial operator or consented portions between the two crews to provide them with the opportunities for rest or sleep breaks to avoid the risk of pilot fatigue (some large wide-body airliners are equipped with special pilot sleeper berths, but more typically reserved seats in the section closest to the flight deck, or cockpit, are used for the relief crew). A relief crew will take over most predominantly during the middle portions of a flight when an aircraft is usually on autopilot and at cruising altitude. The number of relief crew members assigned to a flight depends in part on the length of the flight and the official air regulations the airline operates under.
- Flight engineer (FE), a position originally called an 'Air Mechanic'. On older aircraft, typically between the late-1920s and the 1970s, the flight engineer was the crew member responsible for engines, systems and fuel management. As aircraft became increasingly sophisticated and automated, this function has been mostly assumed by the primary pilots (Captain and FO), resulting in a continued downsizing in the number of aircrew positions on commercial flights. The flight engineer's position is commonly staffed as a second officer. Flight engineers can still be found in the present day (in greatly diminished numbers), used on airline or air freight operations still flying such older aircraft. The position is typically crewed by a dual-licensed Pilot-Flight Engineer in the present day.
- Airborne sensor operator, an airborne sensor operator (aerial sensor operator, ASO, Aerial Remote Sensing Data Acquisition Specialist, Aerial Payload Operator, Police Tactical Flight Officer, Tactical Coordinator etc.) is the functional profession of gathering information from an airborne platform (Manned or Unmanned) and/or oversee mission management systems for academic, commercial, public safety or military remote sensing purposes. The airborne sensor operator is considered a principal flight crew or aircrew member.
- Navigator (archaic), also called 'Air Navigators' or 'Flight Navigators'. A position on older aircraft, typically between the late-1910s and the 1970s, where separate crew members (sometimes two navigation crew members) were often responsible for the flight navigation, including its dead reckoning and celestial navigation, especially when flown over oceans or other featureless areas where radio navigation aids were not originally available. As sophisticated electronic air navigation aids and universal space-based GPS navigation systems came online, the dedicated Navigator's position was discontinued and its function was assumed by dual-licensed Pilot-Navigators, and still later by the aircraft's primary pilots (Captain and FO), resulting in a continued downsizing in the number of aircrew positions on commercial flights. Modern electronic navigation systems made the navigator redundant by the early 1980s.
- Radio operator (archaic). A position on much older aircraft, typically between the mid-1910s and the 1940s, where a separate crew member was often responsible for handling telegraphic and voice radio communications between the aircraft and ground stations. As radio sets became increasingly sophisticated and easier to operate, the function was taken over directly by a FO or SO, and still later by the pilot-in-command and co-pilot, making the radio operator's position redundant.

=== Cabin crew positions ===
Aircraft cabin crew members can consist of:

- Purser or In-flight Service Manager or Cabin Services Director, is responsible for the cabin crew as a team leader.
- Flight attendant is the crew member responsible for the safety of passengers. Historically during the early era of commercial aviation, the position was staffed by young 'cabin boys' who assisted passengers. Cabin boys were replaced by female nurses, originally called 'stewardesses'. The medical background requirement for the flight attendant position was later dropped.
- Flight medic, is a specialized paramedic employed on air ambulance aircraft or flights.
- Loadmaster, is a crew member on a cargo aircraft with cargo ramp (which is used for loading and unloading cargo to and from the aircraft) responsible for loading freight and personnel, and for calculating the aircraft's weight and balance prior to flight, which must be within the aircraft manufacturer's prescribed limits, for safe flight. On non-cargo aircraft, weight and balance tasks are performed by the flight crew or ground handling personnel.

== Military ==
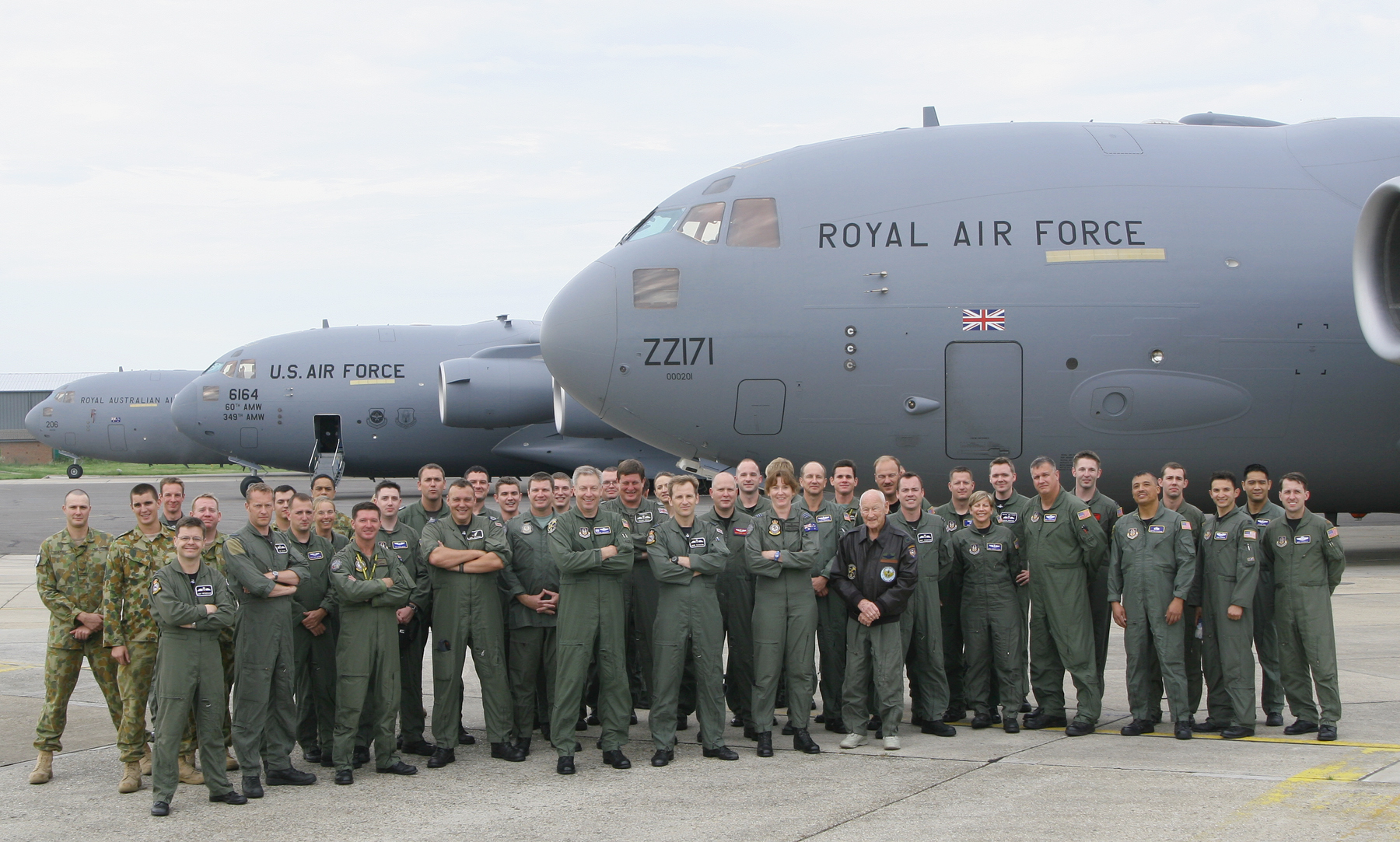
USAF, RAF and RAAF aircrew and maintenance personnel with their C-17s

From the start of military aviation, additional crew members have flown on military aircraft. Over time these duties have expanded:

- Pilot
- Co-pilot
- Air gunner, crew member responsible for the operation of defensive weapons, for example gun turrets. Specific positions include nose gunner, door gunner and tail gunner
- Bombardier or Bomb Aimer is a crew member for the release of ordnance, particularly bombs.
- Boom operator, an aircrew member on tanker aircraft responsible for operating the flying boom and the transfer of fuel.
- Combat systems officer
- Airborne Mission Systems Specialist, an aircrew member who operates some form of electronic or other type equipment such as computers, radars, or intelligence gathering equipment to assist or complete the aircraft's mission.
- Airborne sensor operator, An airborne sensor operator (Aerial Sensor Operator, Tactical Coordinator, EWO etc.) is the functional profession of gathering information from an airborne platform (Manned or Unmanned) and/or oversee mission management systems for tactical, operational and strategic remote sensing purposes.
- Crew chief, an enlisted aircraft mechanic with many various responsibilities. Primary among those are aircraft maintenance, pre-flight/postflight inspections, passenger management, acting as a doorgunner, in-air fire fighting, airspace surveillance, assisting the pilots to land the aircraft in difficult landing zones, assisting pilots with engine start up and shutdown safety, fuel checks, monitoring "hot" refuels (refueling with engines running).
- Flight attendant, a crew member who tends to passengers on military aircraft. This position is similar to the duties performed by commercial flight attendants.
- Flight engineer, a crew member responsible for engines, systems and fuel management.
- Flight officer
- Flight surgeon or flight nurse, aerial medical staff not involved in the operation of the aircraft but is considered by some militaries to be aircrew.
- Loadmaster, crew member responsible for loading freight and personnel and the weight and balance of the aircraft.
- Navigator, a crew member responsible for air navigation. Still actively trained and licensed in some present day militaries, as electronic navigation aids can not be assumed to be operational during warfare.
- Air observer
- Radar intercept officer
- Rescue swimmer on air-sea rescue aircraft
- Signaller or radio operator, crew member responsible for the operation of the aircraft communications systems.
- Tactical coordinator (TACCO), Weapon System Officer on board a Maritime Patrol Aircraft.
- Weapon systems officer (WSO) Commissioned Aircrew Officer Weapons or Mission System Specialist.
- Weapon systems operator (WSOp), as above but Enlisted.

== See also ==
- United States aircrew badges
- Ground crew
