= In-flight crew relief =

Featured role in commercial aviation

In-flight crew relief (commonly referred in noun form as the relief aircrew, relief flight crew, or just relief crew), is a term used in commercial aviation when referring to the members of an aircrew intended to temporarily relieve active crew members of their duties during the course of a flight. The term and its role are almost exclusively applied to the secondary pilots of an aircrew, commonly referred to as relief pilots, that relieve the primary and active captain and/or first officer (co-pilot) in command of an aircraft to provide prolonged breaks for rest or sleep opportunities.

== Usage ==
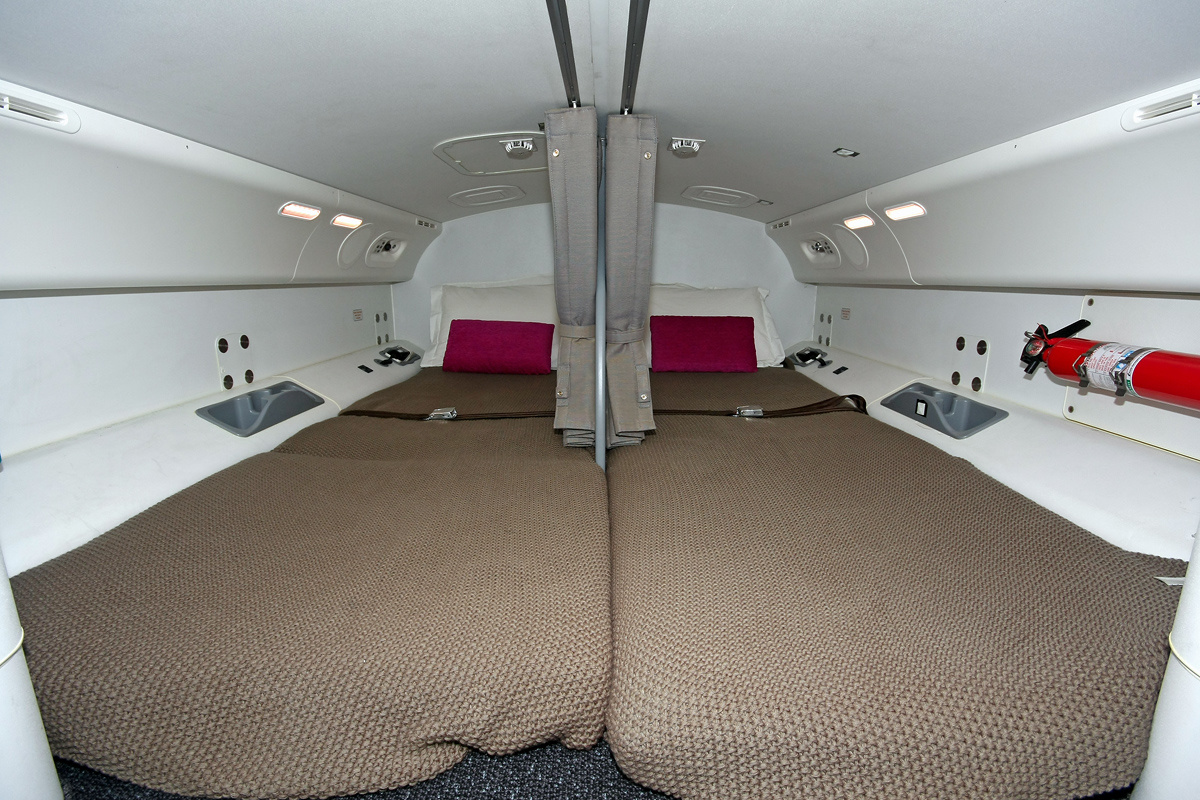
While one crew is flying, the other crew may rest in a crew rest area, such as this one on a Boeing 787

In-flight crew relief is generally required for flights that are determined to be long haul or "ultra long-haul" on aircraft commercially operated (airline operated). In certain places such as the United States, flights will be given these classifications and equipped with relief crews when around or exceeding 8–12 hours domestically or internationally. Operators of these flights prototypically will have 1 or 2 relief pilots to the amalgamated 3 to 4 pilots assigned to the total aircrew depending on the regional jurisdictions regarding flight length.

Initially in the early years of commercial aviation, pilots assigned as the second officer (flight engineer) or third officer of a flight crew would take the role of relieving the commanding captain or first officer when situationally necessary. In modern years however, the pilots consisting of a relief crew are usually certified as captains or first officers correspondingly being referred in certain instances as the relief captain or relief first officer.

A prominent intention for the utilization of in-flight crew relief is in the interval(s) the pilots of the relief crew have aircraft command, the pilots of the primary crew are permitted to exit the flight deck (cockpit) for extended periods of time and be able to regain energy from sleep or rest in the aircraft cabin or dedicated crew rest compartments equipped in some aircraft. This is often considered as an effective and significant factor in lessening the potential risks of pilot fatigue throughout the duration of flights, especially ones scheduled during night and early morning hours. Pilots in the relief crew may be used also to assume command of the aircraft in the event of an in-flight emergency causing or due to the incapacitation or unexpected death of one or both of the commanding pilots of the primary crew.

== Regulations and scheduling arrangements ==
The members of a relief flight crew are intended by their commercial operators to be properly and fully rested prior to the departure of a flight and provided a seat in either the flight deck (typically a jump seat) or a seat in the cabin of the aircraft. Airlines will create their own customary rules and regulations, ones such as Air France require the pilots of both crews present in the flight deck for the takeoff and landing sequences of the flight. Air France also made it requirement for the relief pilot(s) to not engage in operating the aircraft during these processes and to assist in pre-flight planning with the active crew. British Airways has been noted to also require the flight deck presence of the relief pilot(s) during takeoff and landing. They similarly task the relief crew to assist with ground services and flight planning before takeoff in addition to prohibiting "abort" or "go around" directive callouts from the relief pilots in these situations.

According to Cornell Law School, a commercial pilot can't be assigned as a member of a relief flight crew if they exceed "500 hours in any calendar quarter", "800 hours in any two consecutive calendar quarters" or "1,400 hours in any calendar year." The Federal Aviation Administration has approved policies from multiple airlines requiring a qualified crew member such as a relief pilot to be in the flight deck during the short temporary absence of one of the active pilots as a direct result of the crash of Germanwings Flight 9525 in 2015.

The schedule for when the relief crew takes over control of an aircraft's flight deck from the active crew is mainly designated in accordance with the guidelines created by the commercial operator of the aircraft though in some cases it may be arranged along with a verbal consensus between both flight crews. The common system executed between a primary and relief crew from this is that the primary active crew will command the flight for the takeoff and climb segments of the flight. The active crew afterwards would transfer command of the aircraft to the relief crew during the middle portions of the flight, when the aircraft is primarily operating on autopilot at cruising altitude and not requiring substantial manual flight control manipulation. These type pilots of a relief crew that regularly take command during these portions are alternately referred as cruise relief pilots. Cruise relief pilots are designed to command the aircraft typically at altitudes of 20,000 feet and higher. The primary crew will then reassume command typically before the flight's final descent into the landing approach and land the aircraft.

== Scrutinization and refinements ==
The European Cockpit Association (ECA) published an article on April 9, 2014, in which critical concerns and issues regarding flight safety around the specialized relief crew role of a "cruise relief pilot" were expressed. The organization detailed at time of the article's publishing, regulations did not make commercial operators have landing and takeoff training mandatory for cruise relief pilots. The ECA article addresses this further with the probable scenario of an emergency or technical malfunction stating " ...each and every crew member in the cockpit must be able to safely handle, both above and below FL 200."

Two days later on April 11, 2014, the European Aviation Safety Agency (EASA) had proposed safety regulations regarding the liable lack of safety and certifications regulation for cruise relief pilots. Some proposed in the published report included "that a cruise relief co-pilot and a cruise relief pilot are adequately trained and qualified to safely operate an aeroplane during the cruise segment of a flight" and "appropriate operating procedures are established for the transfer of authority from the captain to the cruise relief pilot." The EASA in their report used supporting evidence in the Bureau of Enquiry and Analysis for Civil Aviation Safety's (BEA) investigation into the crash of Air France Flight 447, which no directive or nomination was given from the vacating captain to whether the first officer relieving the captain in the left seat or the first officer in the right seat should be the pilot in command.

== See also ==
- Aircrew
- Crew rest compartment
- Deadheading (employee)
- Pilot fatigue
- Second officer
- Third officer
