= Second officer =

Second officer may refer to:

- Second officer (aviation), a civilian aviation rank
- Second officer or Second mate, a merchant marine rank
- Second officer, a rank in the Women's Royal Naval Service
- Second officer, a rank in the Air Transport Auxiliary
