= UAV ground control station =

Control system for drones

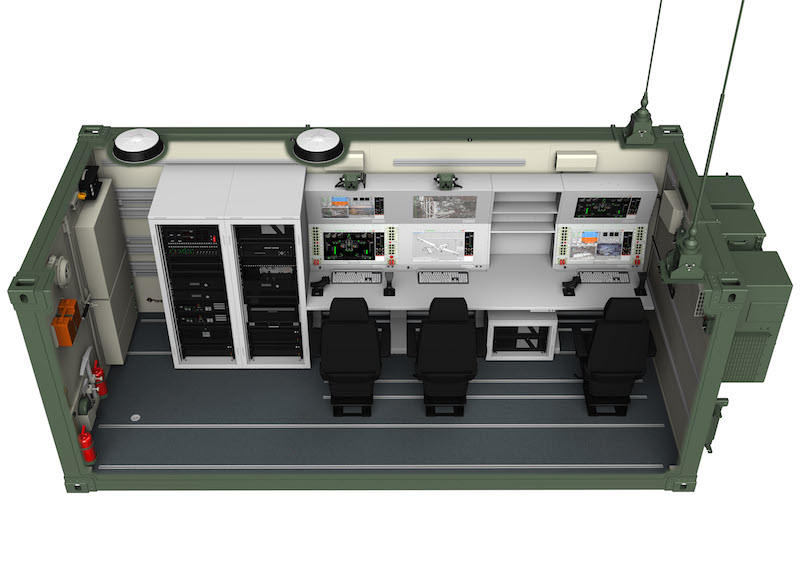
The inside of the Bayraktar TB2 GCS

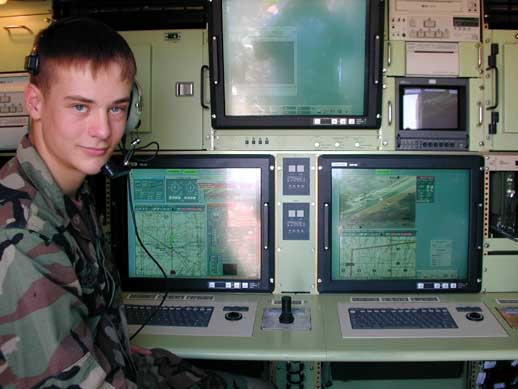
The inside of the RQ-7A Shadow 200 GCS

UAV ground control station (GCS) is a land- or sea-based control centre that provides the facilities for human control of Unmanned Aerial Vehicles (UAVs or "drones"). It may also refer to a system for controlling rockets within or above the atmosphere, but this is typically described as a Mission Control Centre.

== Hardware ==
GCS hardware refers to the complete set of ground-based hardware systems used to control the UAV. This typically includes the Human-Machine Interface, computer, telemetry, video capture card and aerials for the control, video and data links to the UAV.

=== Fixed Installation and Vehicle Mounted GCS ===
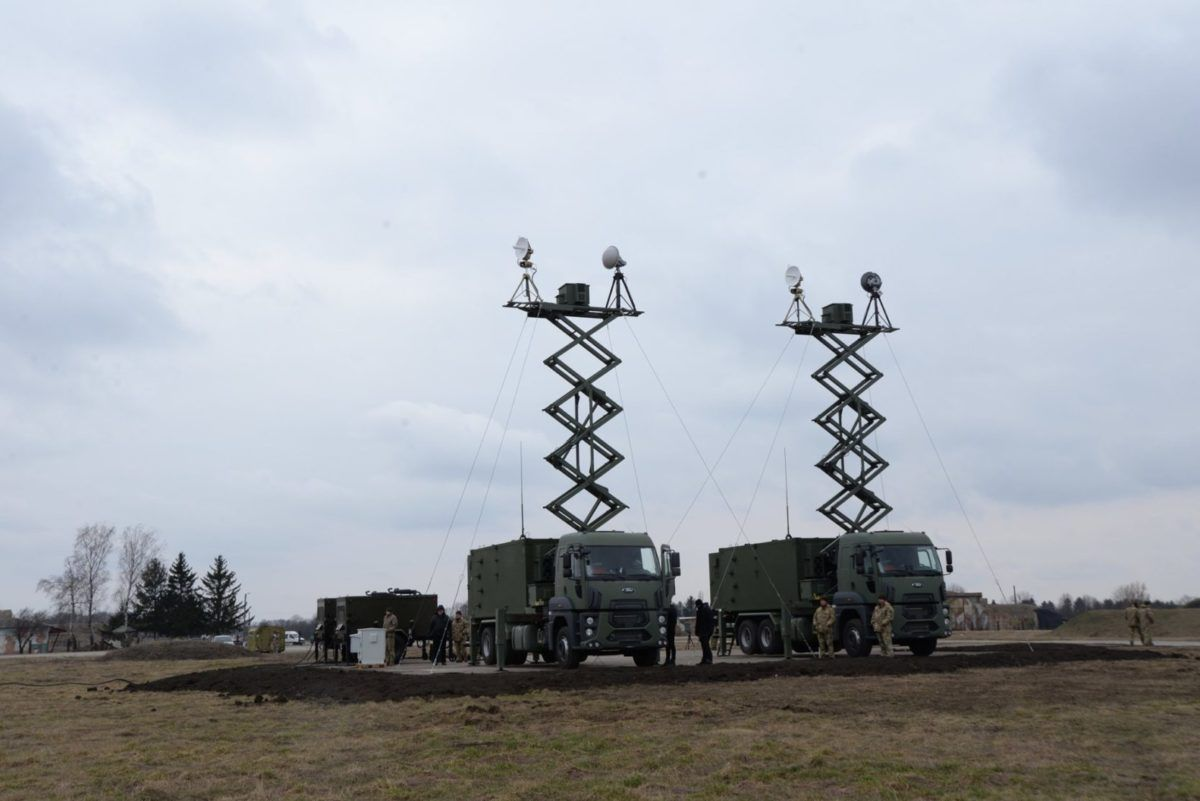
Two ground control stations of Ukrainian Air Force Bayraktar TB2

Larger military UAVs such as the General Atomics MQ-1 Predator feature what resembles a "virtual cockpit". The pilot or sensor operator sits in front of a number of screens showing the view from the UAV, a map screen and aircraft instrumentation. Control is through a conventional aircraft-style joystick and throttle, possibly with Hands on Throttle and Stick (HOTAS) functionality.

In addition, the GCS consists of satellite or long-range communication links that are mounted on the roof or on a separate vehicle, container or building.

=== Portable GCS ===
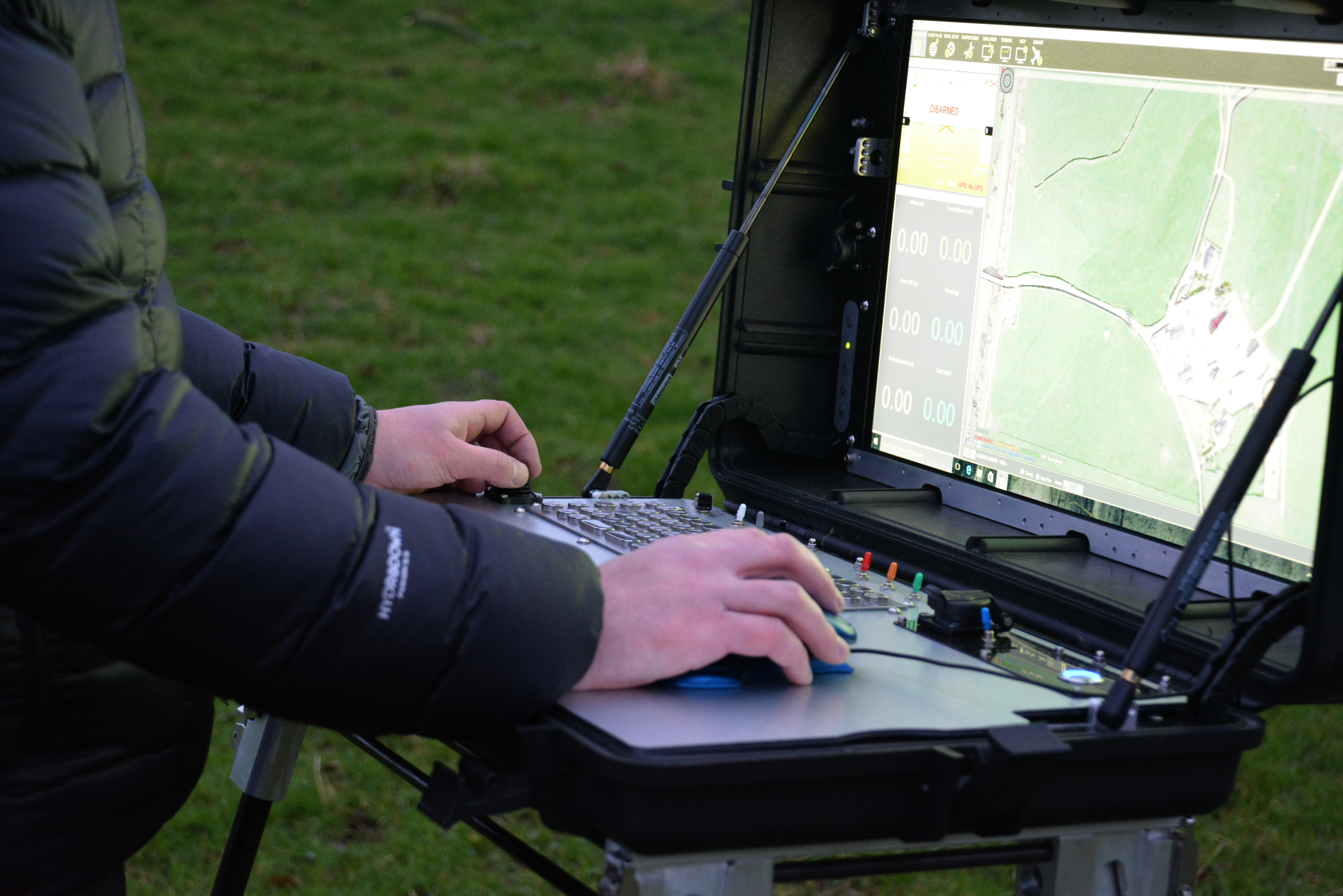
Worthington Sharpe Wing GCS, an example of a portable UAV Ground Control Station (drone GCS)

Smaller UAVs can be operated with a traditional "twin-stick" style transmitter, as used for radio controlled model aircraft. Extending this setup with a laptop or tablet computer, data and video telemetry, and aerials, creates what is effectively a Ground Control Station.

A number of suppliers offer a combined system that consists of what looks like a modified transmitter combined with what is usually a touch screen. An internal computer running the GCS software sits behind the screen, along with the video and data links.

Larger GCS units are also available that typically fit inside flight cases. As with the smaller units, they feature an internal computer running the GCS software, along with video and data links. Large single or dual screens are also fitted that can be high-brightness or treated with an anti-glare coating to increase visibility in bright sunlight. They can either be placed on the ground, on a portable table, or feature integrated folding legs.

Some portable GCS units are in the HOTAS (Hands On Throttle And Stick) layout. This layout includes a 3-Axis Joystick to control yaw, pitch and roll of the UAV. A slide or t-bar fader can increase or decrease the airspeed of the UAV.

== Software ==
GCS software is typically run on a ground-based computer that is used for planning and flying a mission. It provides a map screen where the user can define waypoints for the flight, and see the progress of the mission. It also serves as a “virtual cockpit”, showing many of the same instruments as in manned aircraft.

== See also ==
- Unmanned aerial vehicle
- Shadow 200 TUAV
- Mission control centre
- Rocket launch
- Unmanned aircraft system
