= Sportavia-Pützer RS 180 Sportsman =

RS-180 Sportsman
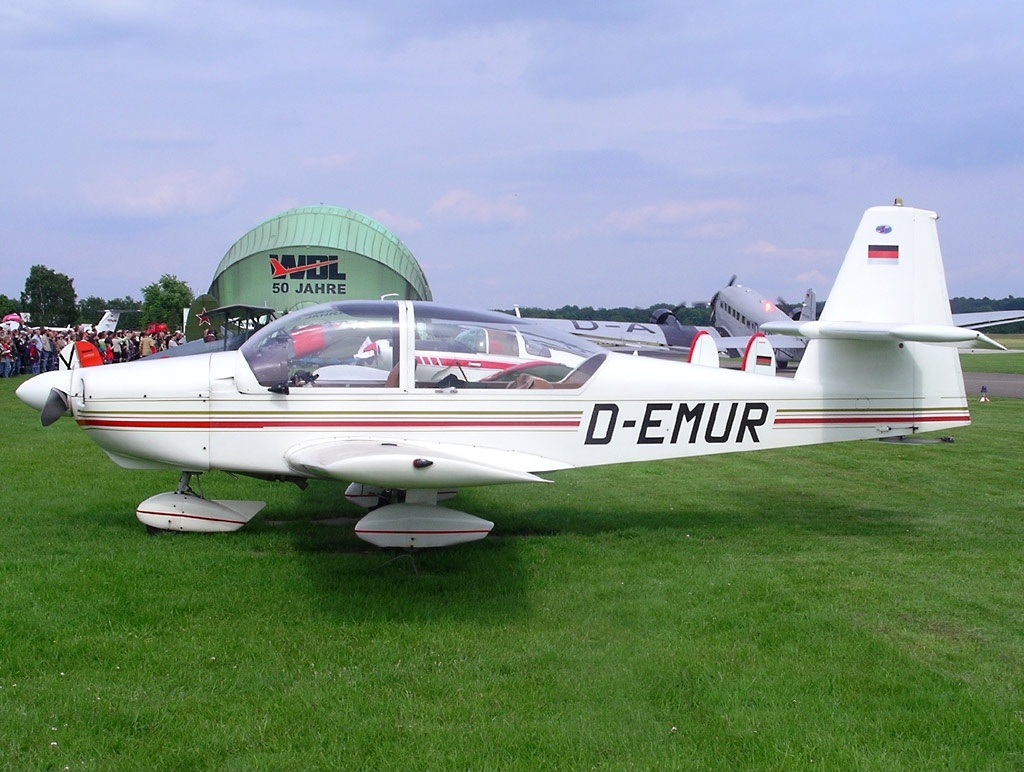

General information
- Type: Sport aircraft
- National origin: Germany
- Manufacturer: Sportavia-Pützer
- Designer: René Fournier
- Number built: 18

History
- First flight: 1978
- Developed from: Fournier RF-6

The Sportavia-Pützer RS-180 Sportsman is a four-seat sport aircraft that was produced in Germany in the late 1970s.

The aircraft is a conventional, low-wing cantilever monoplane with fixed tricycle undercarriage. The pilot and passengers are seated in 2+2 configuration under a large bubble canopy. The structure is of wood, covered in plywood and given an outer skin of fibreglass.

== Design and development ==
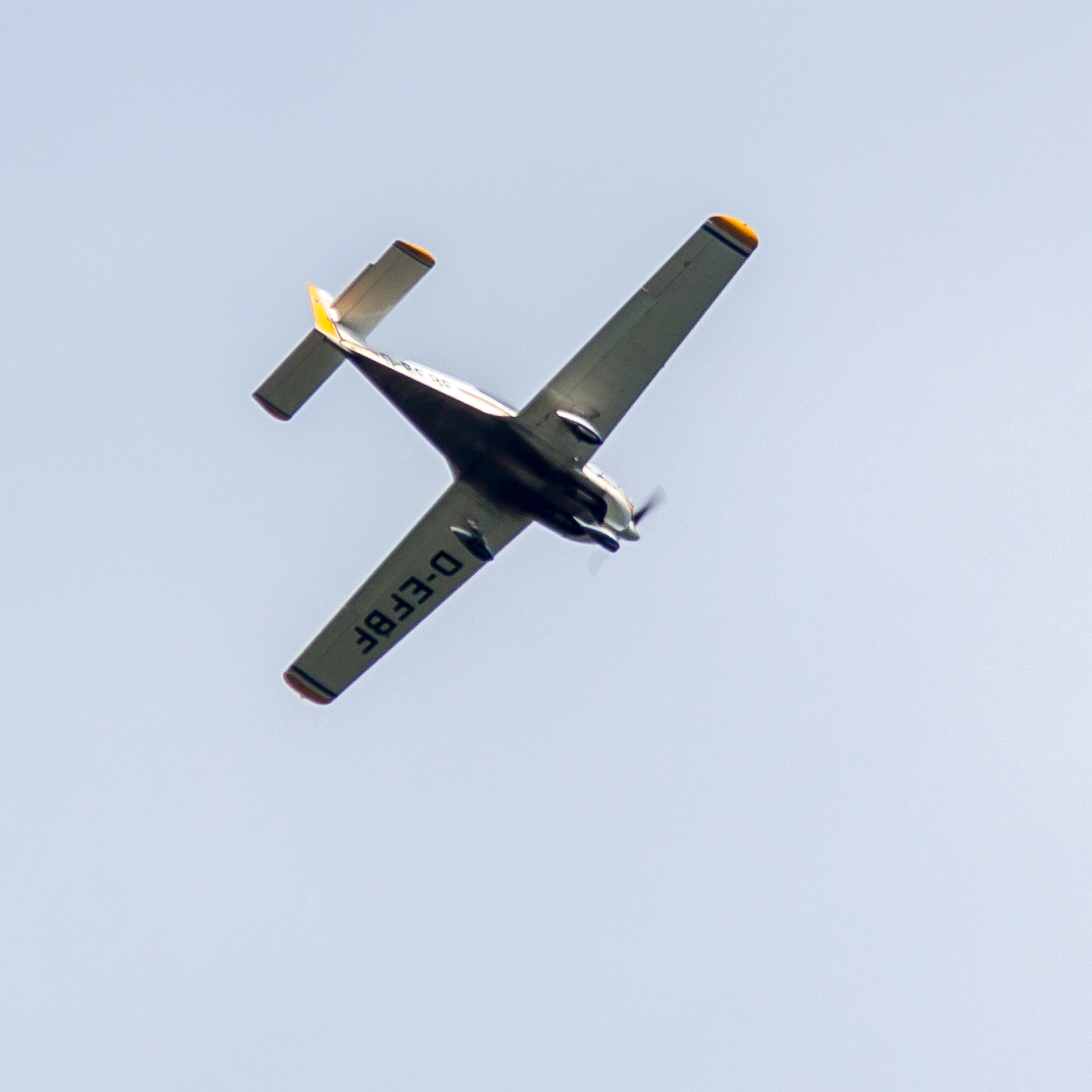
Underside of Sportavia-Putzer RS-180 Sportsman

Sportavia-Pützer was formed in 1966 to take over production from Alpavia SA of several light aircraft designed by René Fournier (aircraft designer). In 1976, it was absorbed by Rhein-Flugzeugbau (RFB).

In 1970 Fournier initiated the design of a new four-seat cabin monoplane, the Sportsman. The first prototype flew on 1 March 1973, but the completely redesigned second prototype didn't fly until 28 April 1976, as the RF-6C Sportsman, which entered production in late 1976. It was redesignated the RS-180 Sportsman when the empennage was altered in early 1978, following the fatal crash of the prototype in May 1977. The extensive redesign included reshaping the horizontal tail and moving it part-way up the fin, changing the wing profile, and removing the RF-6C's turned-down wingtips. In this form, the RS-180 was type certified in Germany in 1978.

The wood structure of the low-wing cantilever monoplane Sportsman is skinned in fibreglass. A fixed nosewheel undercarriage with wheel fairings is used. The cabin employs a large bubble canopy.

At the end of 1980, Sportavia-Pützer was fully integrated into RFB and the RS-180 was re-designated RFB RS-180 Sportsman. Production was halted in early 1981, after fewer than two dozen had been completed.

== Specifications (RS 180) ==
Data from Wurster 2001, p. 89; Mondey, p. 218

General characteristics

- Crew: one pilot
- Capacity: three passengers
- Length: 7.15 m (23 ft 5.5 in)
- Wingspan: 10.5 m (34 ft 5.5 in)
- Height: 2.56 m (8 ft 5 in)
- Wing area: 14.5 m^{2} (156.08 sq ft)
- Aspect ratio: 7.60
- Empty weight: 640 kg (1,411 lb)
- Gross weight: 1,100 kg (2,425 lb)
- Powerplant: 1 × Lycoming O-360-A3A , 134 kW (180 hp)

Performance

- Maximum speed: 320 km/h (200 mph, 170 kn)
- Cruise speed: 225 km/h (140 mph, 120 kn)
- Range: 1,210 km (746 mi, 648 nmi)
- Service ceiling: 5,400 m (17,715 ft)
