= Airborne sensor operator =

Airborne Sensor Operator (ASO)
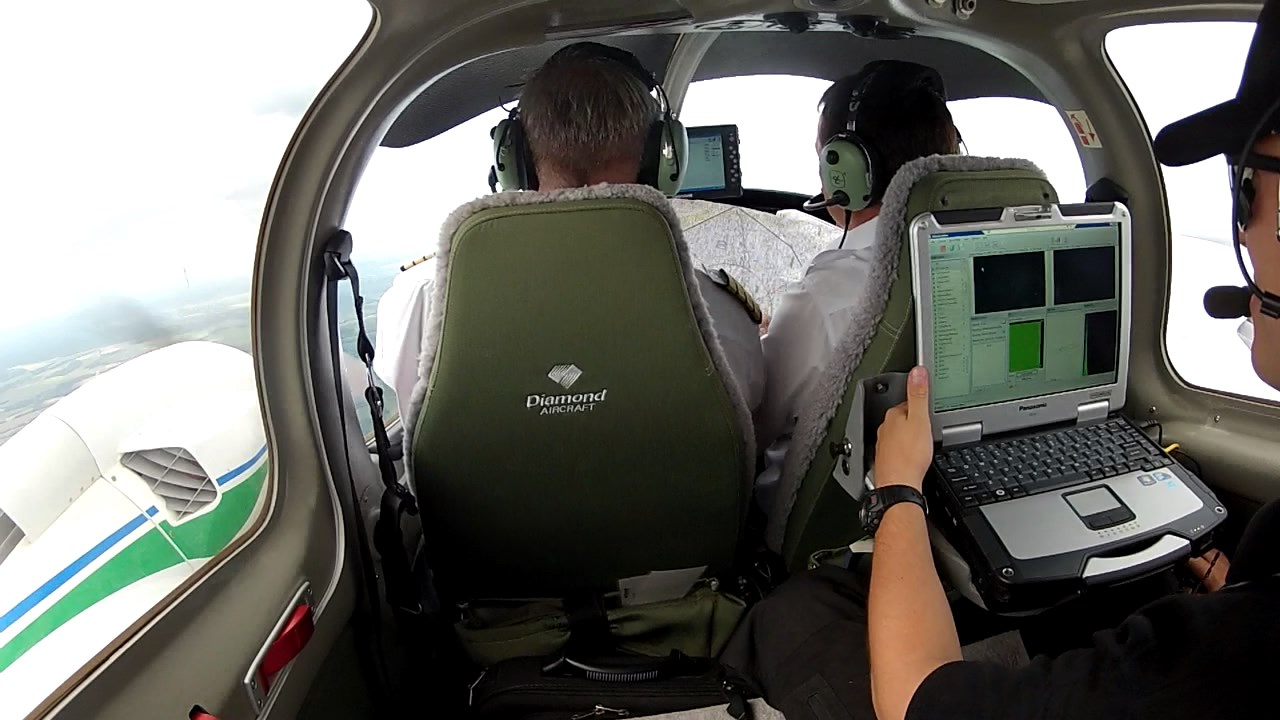

Occupation
- Names: Airborne Sensor Operator, Airborne Electronic Sensor Operator, Payload Operator etc
- Occupation type: Aircrew
- Activity sectors: Aviation

Description
- Competencies: Conducting aerial remote-sensing operations
- Education required: Qualifications in terms of statutory regulations according to national, state, or provincial legislation in each country

An airborne sensor operator (aerial sensor operator, ASO, Aerial Remote Sensing Data Acquisition Specialist, Aerial Payload Operator, Police Tactical Flight Officer, Tactical Coordinator etc.) is the functional profession of gathering information from an airborne platform (Manned or Unmanned) and/or oversee mission management systems for academic, commercial, public safety or military remote sensing purposes. The airborne sensor operator is considered a principal flight crew or aircrew member.

== Past and present ==
The modern airborne sensor operator profession began in 1858 when Gaspard-Felix Tournachon “Nadar” first took aerial photographs of Paris from a hot air balloon. Remote sensing and airborne sensor operator duties continued to grow from there; one of the first planned uses of remote sensing and operators occurred during the U.S. Civil War when manned and unmanned balloons were flown over enemy territory with cameras.

The first governmental-organized air photography missions were developed for military surveillance during World Wars I and II but reached a climax during the Cold War. However, the airborne sensor operator profession developed ever so more in all industry sectors during these decades with the advancement of radar, lasers, radio/signal receivers and electro-optical/infra-red technology.

Today, with the advancement of smaller and more powerful remote sensing systems along with smaller and economical manned and unmanned platforms, the airborne remote sensing industry is expanding in line with many other expanding industry sectors that in the past could not afford and/or try to apply this capability. With this, the airborne sensor operator profession continues to expand and support the need for ever more precision Information.

== Overview ==
=== Responsibilities & duties ===
The primary responsibilities of an airborne sensor operator are to ensure the safe operation of the aircraft, effectively operate assigned remote sensing systems and support the processing, exploitation and dissemination of collected information.

- Some of the general duties of an airborne sensor operator are:
- Flight and sensor planning,
- Sensor installation, testing & maintenance
- Flight & crew management
- Collection management
- Sensor operations
- Quality control (QC) of acquired data
- Processing, exploitation and dissemination of acquired data

=== Industry sectors ===
The specific industry sectors that require airborne sensor operators are varied. The primary sectors are in the commercial surveying, science, public safety & security and defense. Most airborne sensor operators either work for specific government organizations or aerial surveying-imaging firms specializing in data acquisition & processing versus directly with the end user.

In the commercial sector, airborne sensor operators primarily support the agricultural, construction, power supply and mining industries. They routinely support crop monitoring, power line mapping, pipeline monitoring, and geophysical surveying. However, airborne sensor operators support many other sectors that include radio & television, private security, marketing and real estate.

In the science & academic sector, airborne sensor operators primarily support both the commercial and academic communities with developing and testing new remote sensing technology and advancing the knowledge base of specific academic disciplines. In the academic sector, airborne sensor operators are currently supporting archeologist, geologist and meteorologist to integrate remote sensing data into their various disciplines, methods and studies.

In the public safety & security sector, airborne sensor operators primarily support law enforcement and firefighting operations. In the law enforcement sector, the sensor operator is known as a Tactical Flight Officer (TFO) which includes many air-to-ground coordination responsibilities besides managing the aircraft's primary sensors. Furthermore, airborne law enforcement sensor operators support border-control, maritime security and counter-narcotic operations. In the firefighting sector, sensor operators are used in forest firefighting” Lead Plane” functions, metropolitan & urban firefighting support and search & rescue operations.

In the defense sector, airborne sensor operators primarily support intelligence, surveillance and reconnaissance collection operations. The type of collection and systems they manage are in the military disciplines of Signal Intelligence (SIGINT), Measurement Intelligence (MASINT), and Imagery Intelligence (IMINT). However, airborne sensor operators also operate in many other military roles which include tactical combat operations and Combat Search & Rescue (CSAR).

=== Platforms and systems ===
Airborne Sensor Operators perform their functions on/with both manned and unmanned aircraft with either active or passive sensors.

In regard to manned platforms, Airborne Sensor Operators operate on board large to small fix-wing and rotary-wing aircraft. The typical fixed-wing aircraft used in commercial, academic and public safety operations is either single or twin engine general aviation airframes (C-172, TECNAM 2006, King Air) with a minimum capability to support a crew of two, power supply, workstation, sensor payload, data links and endurance to meet collection requirements. The typical fix-wing aircraft used in military operations varies from small single or twin engine general aviation airframes (C-332 Skymaster) to purpose built military airframes like the P-3 Orion, S-3 Viking and the new P-8 Poseidon, to large wide-body jet aircraft (RC-135) with multiple work stations and long endurance capabilities. The typical manned rotorcraft (R22/44, Eurocopter EC145, Bell 205 SH-60 M/R Seahawk) used by all industry sectors is either light turbine or twin engine helicopters with a minimum capability to support a crew of two, power supply, workstation, sensor payload, data link and endurance to meet collection requirements.

In regard to unmanned platforms, airborne sensor operators operate off-board of fixed-wing and rotorcraft unmanned aerial vehicles (UAV). The primary categories of UAVs that airborne sensor operators support are Mid-Altitude Long Endurance (MALE / RQ-1, Heron) and High-Altitude Long Endurance (HALE / RQ-4, RQ-9) systems. Micro, small or tactical UAV systems usually require one operator who acts as both pilot and sensor operator. Typically, a UAV sensor operator is positioned next to the UAV operator/pilot at a stationary or mobile Ground Control Unit (GCU) with computer hardware & software to manage both flight, sensor and data-link operations.

In regard to sensors, airborne sensor operators work with either active sensors or passive sensors. The typical active sensors used by sensor operators are Synthetic Aperture Radar (SAR), Light Detection and Ranging (LIDAR) and sonar. The typical passive sensors used by sensor operators are electro-optical/ infrared (EO/IR), Hyper-spectral, RGB cameras, Thermal cameras, magnetometers and communication/signal receivers.

Besides the different type of platforms and sensors that airborne sensor operators work with, operators routinely work with various other types of aircraft systems (emergency, navigation, radios, intercom, data links and data recorders) or ground data processing, exploitation and dissemination hardware & software.

=== Training ===
At a minimum, an airborne sensor operator should have the required knowledge or training to effectively operate in the flight environment, operate sensors and provide a usable product to the end user. The following knowledge areas define the baseline of a proficient airborne sensor operator:

- Theory of flight and aeronautics
- Meteorology
- Manned & unmanned aircraft systems & capabilities
- Aerial navigation
- Radio & communication operations
- Flight & airfield operations and procedures
- Crew resource management (CRM) and human factors (HF)
- Electro-magnetic spectrum
- Passive sensor systems & capabilities
- Active sensor systems & capabilities
- Sensor operations and maintenance
- Mission planning & mission management
- Processing, exploitation and dissemination systems & capabilities

The training avenues for airborne sensor operators are either informal or formal. Informal programs consist of on-the-job-training with limited classroom training and immersion with current operations. Informal training usually takes place in-house of established commercial airborne surveying & imaging firms or academic organizations. Formal training routinely consists of initial training and advance training programs. Formal training programs are primarily provided by defense organizations, law enforcement departments and by a limited number of commercial training firms for a fee. The length of each type of training avenue is based on the complexity of the duties required, systems and the resources available. Informal training usually takes from several days to several weeks while formal training programs take several weeks to one year.

=== Work conditions ===
Airborne sensor operators work in all kinds of conditions, so it depends on what industry sector one works in. In general, the working conditions get better as an operator gains experience and are able to have a larger, wider choice of who they fly for and what sort of flying that agency or company does.

The working conditions vary from working for a regional aerial surveying firm on a part-time base to working full-time in a large organization where there is a career path and other additional duties. Most airborne sensing operators have a variable work schedule, working several days on and several days off based on tasking, availability of assets and weather. A large percentage of sensor operators spend a considerable amount of time away from home because of the diverse locations of collection areas. When airborne sensor operators are away from home, the agencies or companies provide lodging accommodations, transportation between lodging and the airfield or launch/recovery location, and an allowance for meals and other expenses. Remote sensing organizations operate flights at all hours of the day and night, so work schedules often are irregular.

Sensor operators are paid hourly in smaller firms and a salary in larger organizations. Benefits are rare but are usually offered at the larger agencies or companies. Average pay is $20 to $30 an hour and the average salary for airborne sensor operator jobs is $41,000 to $54,000. However, the average airborne sensor operator hourly wages or salaries can vary greatly due to company, location, industry, experience and benefits.

== See also ==
- Aerial photography
- Aerial survey
- Aircrew (flight crew)
- Aviation safety
- Geographic information system
- Intelligence, surveillance, target acquisition, and reconnaissance
- Police aviation
- Remote sensing
- Unmanned aerial vehicle
