= First officer (aviation) =

Flight crew role

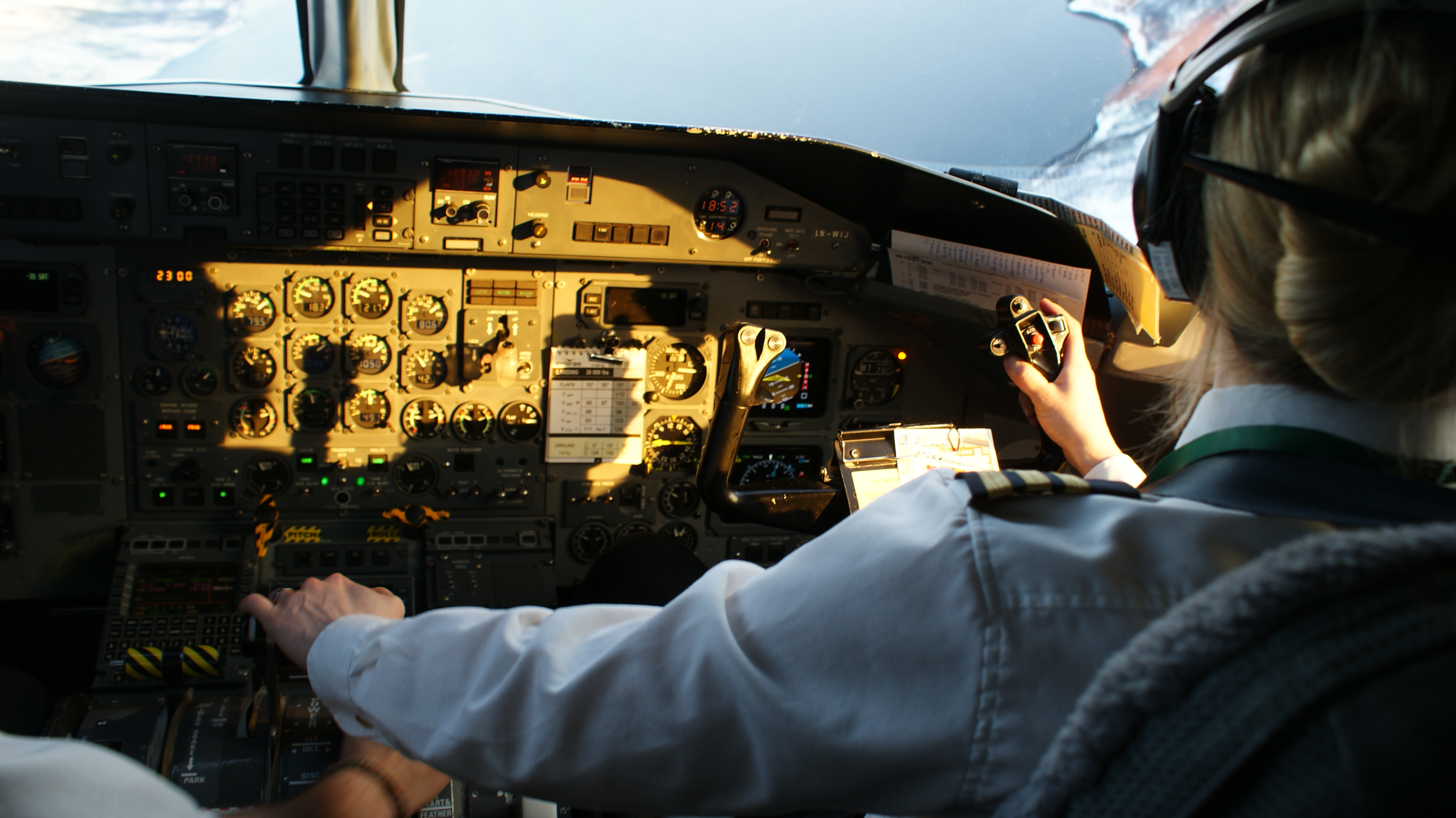
A first officer at the controls of a de Havilland Canada Dash 8 passenger aircraft

In aviation, the first officer (FO) also called co-pilot, is a pilot who serves as the second-in-command of an aircraft, alongside the captain, who is the legal commander. In the event of incapacitation of the captain, the first officer will assume command of the aircraft.

== Requirement ==
Historically, large aircraft had several personnel on the flight deck, such as a navigator, a flight engineer, and a dedicated radio operator. Improvements in automation and reliability have reduced this to two.

Many aircraft require a minimum of two flight crew. The minimum crew requirement will be stated in the aircraft manuals by the manufacturer. In the European Union, all turbo-propeller aeroplanes with a maximum approved passenger seating configuration of more than nine and all turbo-jet aeroplanes require two pilots.

== Role ==
Control of the aircraft is normally shared equally between the first officer and the captain, with one pilot normally designated the "pilot flying" and the other the "pilot not flying", or "pilot monitoring", for each flight. Even when the first officer is the flying pilot, however, the captain remains ultimately responsible for the aircraft, its passengers, and the crew. In typical day-to-day operations, the essential job tasks remain fairly equal. Often the first officer will log time as pilot in command under supervision (PICUS), for the purpose of working towards an airline transport pilot license.

Traditionally, the first officer sits on the right-hand side of a fixed-wing aircraft ("right seat") and the left-hand side of a helicopter (the reason for this difference is related to, in many cases, the pilot flying being unable to release the right hand from the cyclic control to operate the instruments, thus they sit on the right side and do that with the left hand).

On a long haul flight, there may be multiple captains and first officers on board, to act as relief crew. While the captain rests, the senior of first officers sits in the left-hand seat, as for example on Air France Flight 447.

Some airlines have the rank of "junior first officer", for pilots who are not yet fully qualified. Modern airliners require two pilots. When a junior first officer is undergoing training, a safety pilot will sit in the jump seat to monitor the junior first officer and the captain. A junior first officer is sometimes known as a second officer. After a certain number of flight hours and experience, a first officer can be promoted to senior first officer. A senior first officer will typically have at least 1,500 hours flight experience.

A first officer may be older or have more experience than a captain. A captain may choose to return to a first officer role to take a job at a different airline. Some pilots prefer to remain a senior first officer than pursue an upgrade to captain, due to the benefits of seniority.

== See also ==
- Aircrew
- Chief mate
- Second officer (aviation)
- Third officer (aviation)

== Bibliography ==
- Harris, Tom. How Airline Crews Work, HowStuffWorks.com website, June 14, 2001. Retrieved September 2, 2014.
- Smith, Patrick. Patrick Smith's Ask The Pilot: When a Pilot Dies in Flight, AskThePilot.com website, 2013, which in turn cites:
- Smith, Patrick. Cockpit Confidential: Everything You Need to Know About Air Travel: Questions, Answers, and Reflections, Sourcebooks, 2013, ISBN 1402280912, ISBN 978-1402280917.
- Flying the World in Clipper Ships at flightjournal.com, 2007.
