= Third officer (aviation) =

Civil aviation rank

Third officer is a rarely used civil aviation rank. It was primarily used by Pan Am, particularly on its Clippers flying boats during the infancy of extended range airline routes. The third officer would serve as a relief pilot and aircrew member, and could move between pilot, co-pilot, radio officer, and flight engineer positions to provide a rest period for the primary crews.

The position of third officer is rare in modern civil aviation. Modern airliners only require two pilots, the captain and the first officer. Where relief crew are required for long haul flights, additional captains and first officers will be carried. Junior first officers undergoing training are sometimes known as second officers.

== Notable third officers ==
- Gene Roddenberry (Pan Am)

== See also ==
- Pilot in command
- Second officer (aviation)
- Third mate
