= Second officer (aviation) =

Civilian aviation rank

Second officer is a civil aviation rank, also known as junior first officer. It is used for pilots at an early stage of their career.

== Role ==
Modern airliners require only two pilots: the captain and the first officer. Before a pilot is fully qualified to operate as first officer, they will typically act as a second officer, sitting in the right hand seat, while undergoing training and supervision from a training captain. A safety pilot will sit in the jump seat to monitor the junior first officer and the captain.

In some airlines, a second officer is not permitted to take off or land the aircraft, and will only fly the aircraft during the cruise. In such cases they are also known as "cruise pilots" or "cruise relief pilots".

At Singapore Airlines and Scoot, second officers are usually promoted to first officer after 5-8 months. In Ryanair UK, pilots are promoted from second officer to junior first officer when they achieve 500 hours of flight time.

In some airlines second officer is just a rank given to the Co-pilot which can be contractually classified as Senior - First - Second officer given the experience and time in the company. The role in the flight deck of a modern aircraft will be Captain and Co-pilot .

In this case, the Co-pilot will be classified as Second officer in their first years in the company and will upgrade to a First - Senior First officer after a certain number of years in the company and a minimum number of hours.

In their first hours, the new Second officer will operate as a trainee with a Training Captain and a safety Pilot in the jumpseat acting as the designated responsible Co-pilot. This jumpseat pilot can be a Second officer but must have successfully passed all Line exams.

After successfully passing their initial flight and simulator exams, the Trainee will lose the need for a safety Pilot on the jumpseat and will fly only with a Training Captain. With further testing and experience, they are authorized to fly normal line operations without any training captains.

== Usage ==
Airlines which use the title "second officer" include:

- Air New Zealand
- Cathay Pacific
- China Eastern Airlines
- Jet2.com
- KLM
- Lufthansa
- Qantas
- Scoot
- Singapore Airlines
- Volotea

Historically, the second officer was the flight engineer. This is a trained pilot who does not fly the aircraft, but instead monitors aircraft systems. Modern airliners only require two pilots, and do not have a flight engineer or a navigator.

== See also ==
- Pilot in command
- Second mate
- Third officer (aviation)
- Co-Pilot
