= Disciplined Services =

Hong Kong government department

- Traditional Chinese: 紀律部隊
- Simplified Chinese: 纪律部队
Transcriptions
Standard Mandarin
- Hanyu Pinyin: Jìlǜ Bùduì
Yue: Cantonese
- Yale Romanization: Géi leuht bouh deuih
- Jyutping: Gei2 leot6 bou6 deoi6

In Hong Kong, the Disciplined Services consist of ICAC, Police Force, Fire Services, Correctional Services, Customs, Immigration, and Government Flying Service.

The Independent Commission Against Corruption (ICAC) reports directly to the Chief Executive. Except in detention centres, most ICAC officers (including investigators) do not need to wear uniforms. Much of their work is classified. They treat the identity of the complainant in strict confidence (try to keep it confidential). After lodging a complaint to the ICAC, the complainant cannot disclose the identity of the subject person.

Six regular forces report to the Security Bureau:

1. Hong Kong Police Force
  - Hong Kong Auxiliary Police Force
2. Hong Kong Fire Services Department
  - Emergency Ambulance Service
3. Correctional Services Department
4. Customs and Excise Department
5. Immigration Department
6. Government Flying Service

Two auxiliary forces also report to the Security Bureau. They are mainly staffed by volunteers trained in responding to emergency and operations.

1. Civil Aid Service
2. Auxiliary Medical Service
