= Hong Kong–Philippines relations =

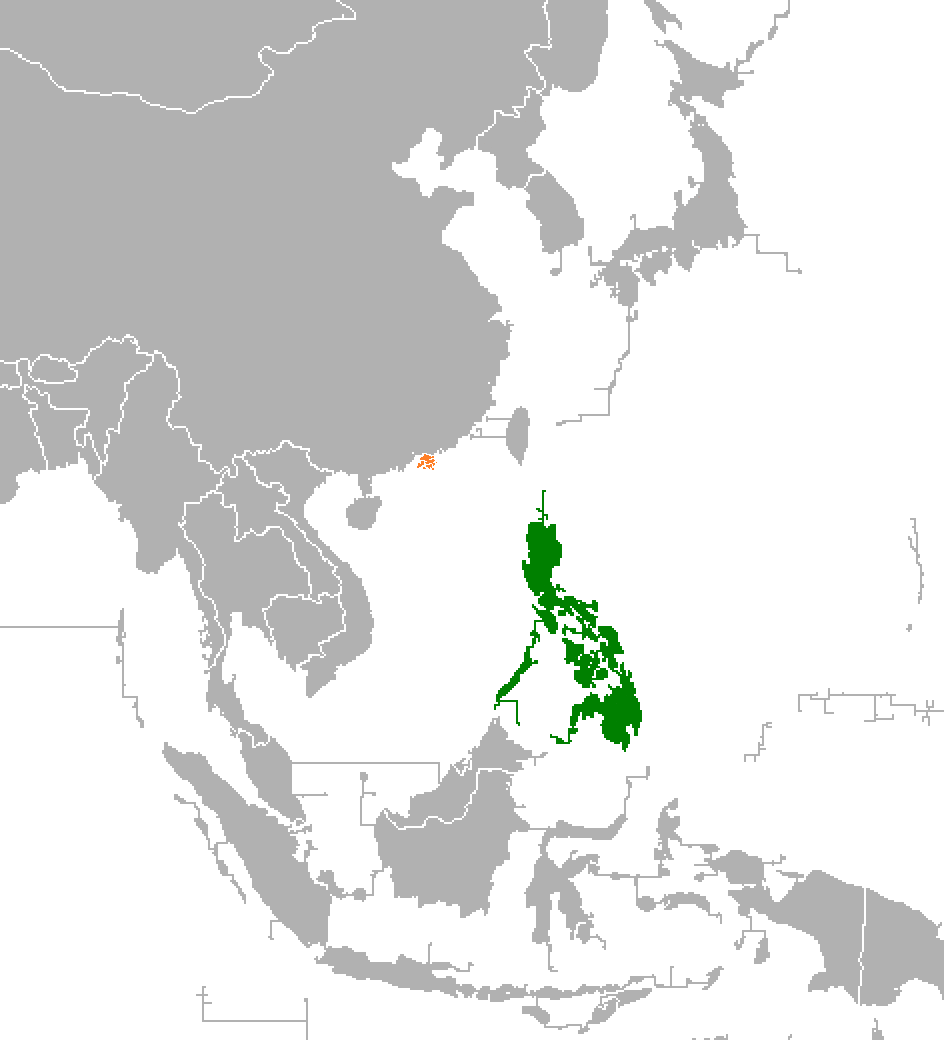

- Philippines: Hong Kong

The Hong Kong–Philippines relations refers to the relations of the Republic of the Philippines and Hong Kong Special Administrative Region. Under the Hong Kong Basic Law, the People's Republic of China is responsible for diplomatic and defence affairs of Hong Kong. However, Hong Kong enjoys significant autonomy in other aspects and is eligible to establish relations with sovereign states in a broad range of "appropriate fields". Ties between the two entities were soured due to the aftermath of the 2010 Manila hostage crisis but has been normalized since April 2014.

== History ==
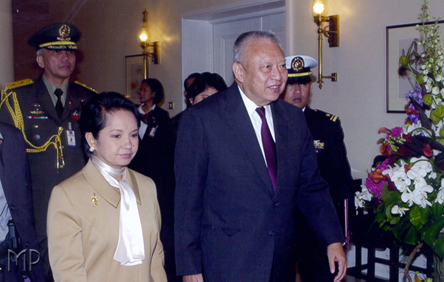
Meeting between President Gloria Macapagal Arroyo and Hong Kong Chief Executive Tung Chee-hwa

The Philippines has a Consulate General in Hong Kong, as part of the country's series of diplomatic missions on Chinese soil. The first Filipino diplomatic mission in Hong Kong was set up as a consulate in March 1947, then received elevation as a consulate-general in 1958. When the United Kingdom transferred Hong Kong to China on July 1, 1997, the Philippines and China signed an agreement on November 26, 1996, for the continuous operation and maintenance of the Consulate General in Hong Kong. The diplomatic mission serves as an outlet on the Philippine's interest in Hong Kong, especially for the growing Filipino community in Hong Kong.

Relations between the two entities soured following the aftermath of the mismanaged 2010 Manila hostage crisis, which claimed Hong Konger lives. Hong Kong's Security Bureau, blacklisted the Philippines on the Outbound Travel Alert following the incident. In 2013, a survey conducted by the University of Hong Kong regarding public opinion on selected foreign governments and nationalities, 86 percent of those surveyed "disliked" the Philippine government, only one percent liked the Philippine government. Regarding views on Filipino nationals 41 percent disliked Filipinos and 11 percent liked Filipinos.

In April 2014, ties between Hong Kong and the Philippines normalized after the two governments agreed to settle the incident. According to a joint statement issued on April 23, 2014, the Philippines expressed its "most sorrowful regret and profound sympathy” for the incident. Manila Mayor Joseph Estrada and his delegate flew to Hong Kong on April 22 to aid in settling the issue. Hong Kong resumed visa-free access for Filipino diplomats and officials which was suspended in January 2014. The travel warning imposed against the Philippines was also lifted by Hong Kong.

== Tourism ==
According to the Philippine Department of Tourism, arrivals from Hong Kong to the Philippines amounted to 118,666 on 2013, a 2.78 percent rise from 2011 figures. Hong Kong is the 9th largest source of visitors visiting the Philippines. Hong Kong saw 659,829 visitors from the Philippines in 2010.

== Filipinos in Hong Kong ==
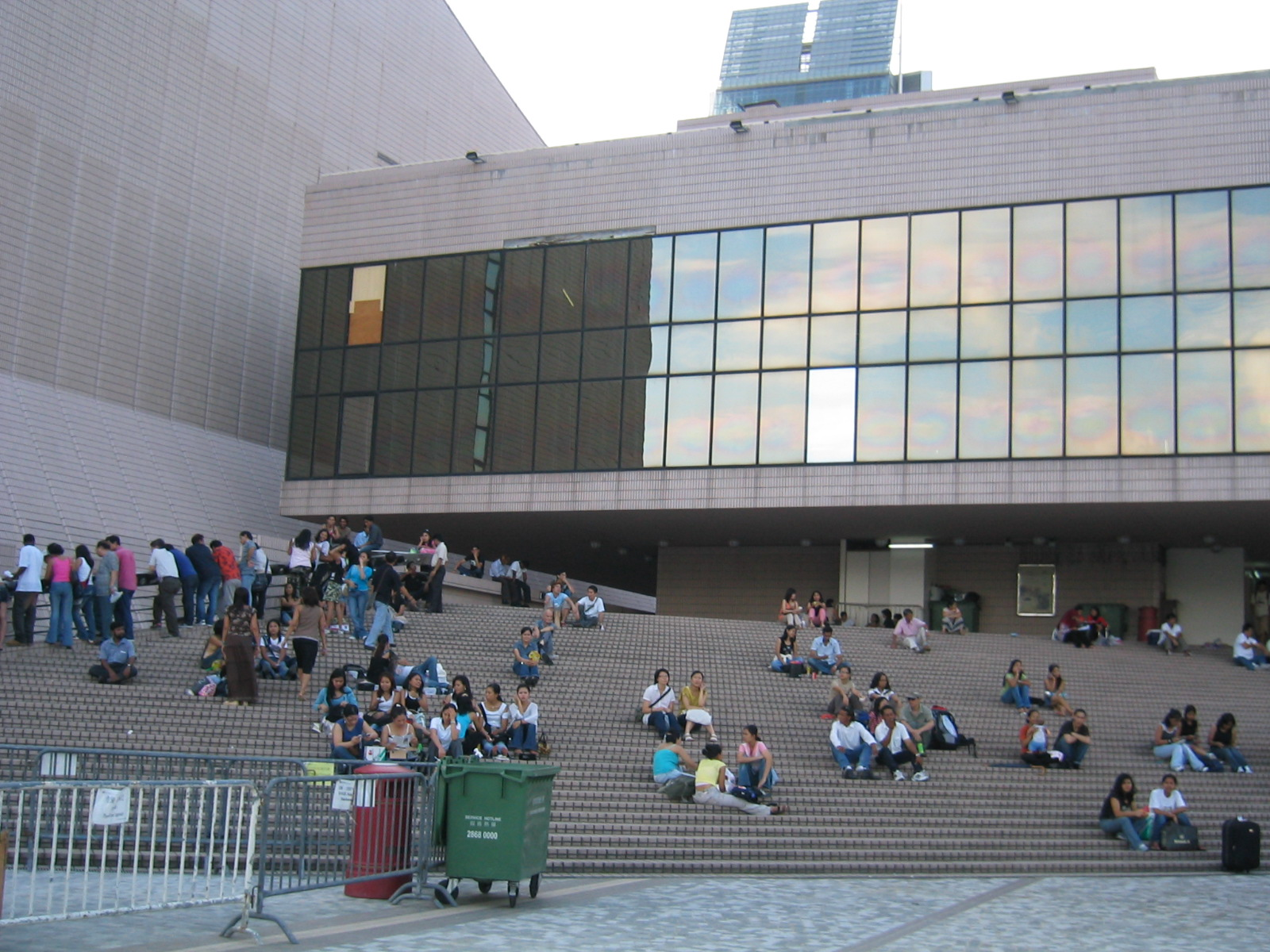
Filipino migrant workers gathering around the Hong Kong Cultural Centre in Tsim Sha Tsui.

There are around 238,000 Filipinos in Hong Kong, a majority of whom work as foreign domestic helpers.
