= Emergency medical services in Hong Kong =

Emergency medical services in Hong Kong are provided by the Hong Kong Fire Services Department, in co-operation with two other voluntary organisations, the Auxiliary Medical Service and the Hong Kong St. John Ambulance. The Government Flying Service provides air ambulance service, while the Civil Aid Service provides emergency services in search and rescue when the casualty is located in rural areas.

Public hospitals have charged HK$100 for treatment at accident and emergency departments since 2002. About 2.2 million use the service each year. Waiting time varies between one hour and more than five hours. In 2017 it was decided to increase the cost to HK$180 with an expansion of the fee waiver mechanism. The actual cost per patient is about HK$1,230 as of May 2023, having been HK$1,390 in 2017-2018

The ambulance service from the Hong Kong Fire Service pledges to have an arrival of an ambulance at the street address from the time of call within 12 minutes.

== Organisation ==
The Hong Kong Fire Service is the statutory provider of emergency ambulance service in Hong Kong, as mandated by regulations from the Legislative Council. The service has a considerable history, but only amalgamated into a single unified service in 1979, when previous government ambulance operations were merged with those of the fire service. The service employs some 2200 people and operates approximately 256 emergency ambulances and 35 motorcycles from 36 depots, located strategically around the Hong Kong territory. In 2006, the service responded to more than 575,000 emergency calls, and transported approximately 514,000 people to hospital. In addition, the service operates a number of rapid response vehicles, and four heavy truck-based Mobile Treatment Centres. The service provides emergency transport to the 17 publicly operated Hong Kong Hospital Authority facilities which operate Accident and Emergency departments. The service follows the Anglo-American model (as opposed to the Franco-German model) of EMS service provision. It is rare to see a physician at the scene of an emergency.

The statutory service is supplemented by two organisations – St. John Ambulance, a charity organisation and the Auxiliary Medical Service, a government-run voluntary service. Both of these services focus primarily on providing coverage to special events, and on public education, although both have written agreements with the statutory service to provide additional ambulances during a disaster.

=== Air Ambulance ===
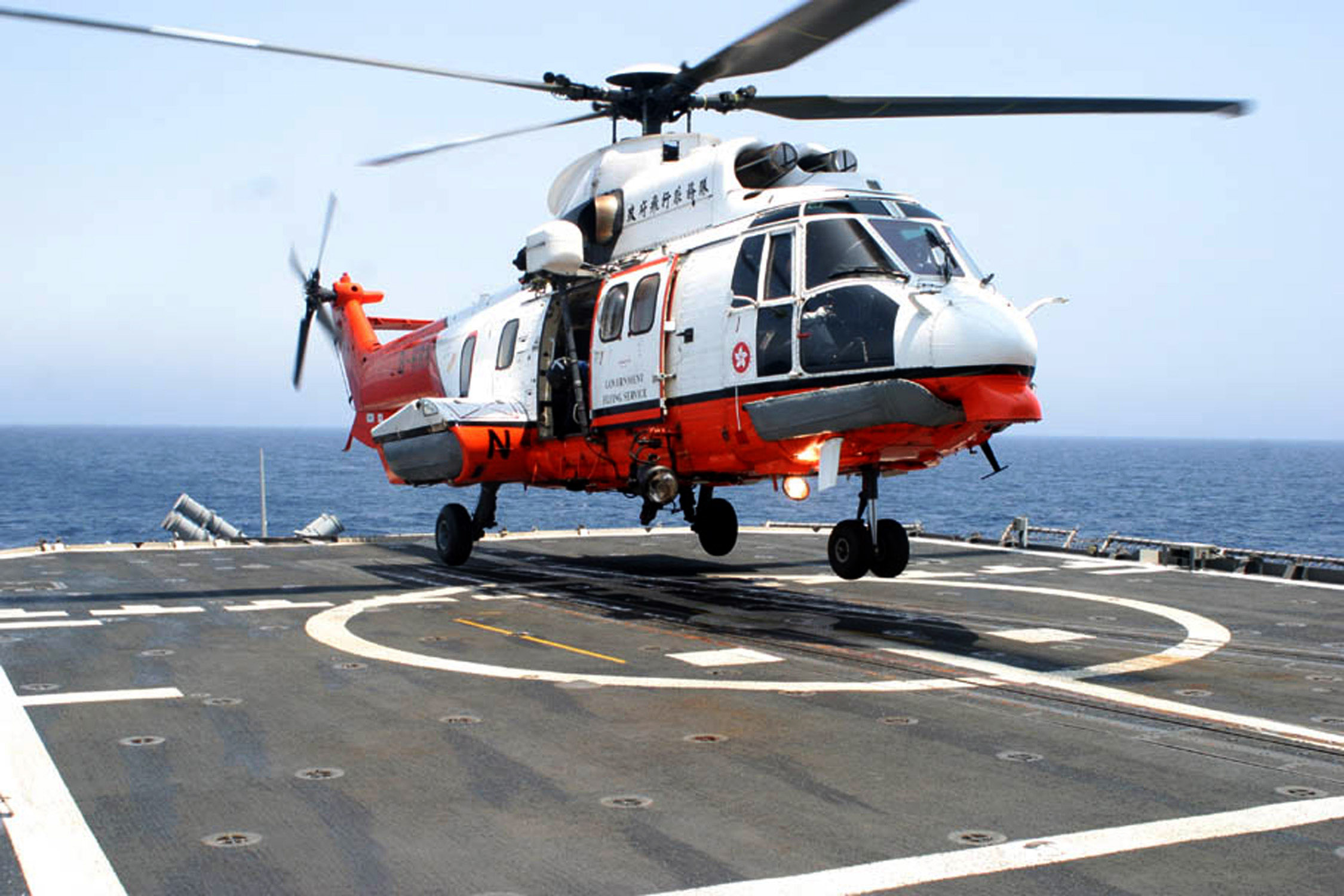
Government Flying Service Helicopter, used for air ambulance and also search & rescue

In Hong Kong, all air ambulance service is provided by the Government Flying Service; a joint service providing aviation support to all departments of the government. The service operates from two bases (the current and former Hong Kong airports, Hong Kong International Airport and Kai Tak Airport. While the service employs a number of different types of aircraft, those used for both air ambulance service and search and rescue service are primarily of the Puma and Super-Puma types. The physical terrain is such that most level areas are densely populated and heavily built up. As a result, air ambulance operations usually involve those communities which are isolated either in the mountains, or on offshore islands, with an occasional rescue at sea or medevac flight from a ship. It used to have ambulance crew with basic life support equipment from Hong Kong Fire Service Department (HKFSD) abroad when mission needed. Under the "Air Medical Officer" (AMO) programme, helicopters are equipped with advanced medical apparatus and medical personnel from GFS Auxiliary Section can administer emergency treatment in the air since 2000. GFS Auxiliary Section is a group of 24 volunteer doctors and 27 volunteer nurses from hospitals who specialised in Accident and Emergency (A&E) medicine. Enlisted as auxiliary officers, they operate as part of the aircrew on non-risky rescue missions during 09:30–18:30 at weekends (Fri-Mon) and public holidays when the majority of recreational accidents occur. This programme aims to provide a higher level of medical care to the injured right on the spot and during transit to hospital. During 2011, the flight doctors and nurses flew a total of 405 hours in 573 operations. Nowadays, the programme is not enough to support current heavy demand on air medical emergency basis 24x7, 365 days a year. To be qualified as flight paramedic, some of standing Air Crewman Officers (ACMO) is recently receiving pre-hospital care training from Hospital Authority (HA) as well as Hong Kong Fire Service Department.

== Standards ==
=== Vehicles ===
The majority of ambulances in Hong Kong are originally of British design; a reflection of Hong Kong's long association with Britain. As a result, the design of the majority of ambulances approximately corresponds to the European Standard CEN 1789 as published by the European Committee for Standards with respect to vehicle design and equipment, although not with the visual identity provisions. Until recently, most vehicles corresponded with the European Class B design, although current vehicle acquisitions more closely resemble the Class C design. Given that Hong Kong has never been a member of the European Community, it appears likely that the approximate compliance is coincidental. In addition, the service operates a handful of vehicles for isolated areas where the full-sized ambulances have difficulty in travelling. These are known locally as 'village ambulances'. In terms of visual identity, most ambulances in Hong Kong are white in body colour, with the newest addition to the fleet being yellow in colour, similar to the British design and standard. All ambulances in service are equipped with flashing blue lights and with sirens. The emergency ambulances operated by the Hong Kong Fire Service display red livery, while those of the voluntary agencies display green livery. All of the emergency ambulances of the Hong Kong Fire Service carry advanced life support (ALS) equipment, while those of the volunteer agencies do not. All Hong Kong ambulances carry Automatic External Defibrillators (AED).

Typical EMS Vehicles in Hong Kong

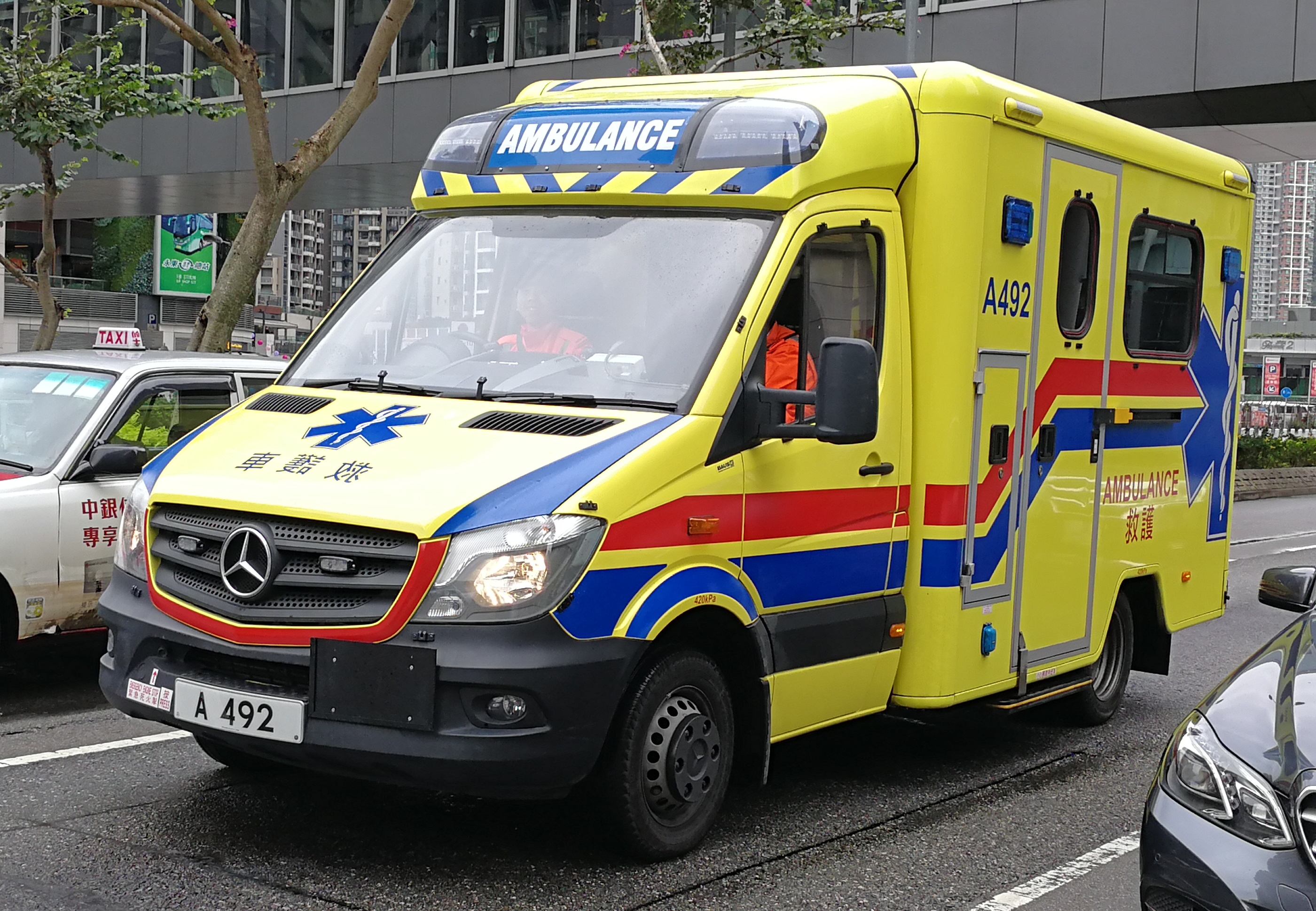
Hong Kong Fire Service ambulance, in its updated yellow livery

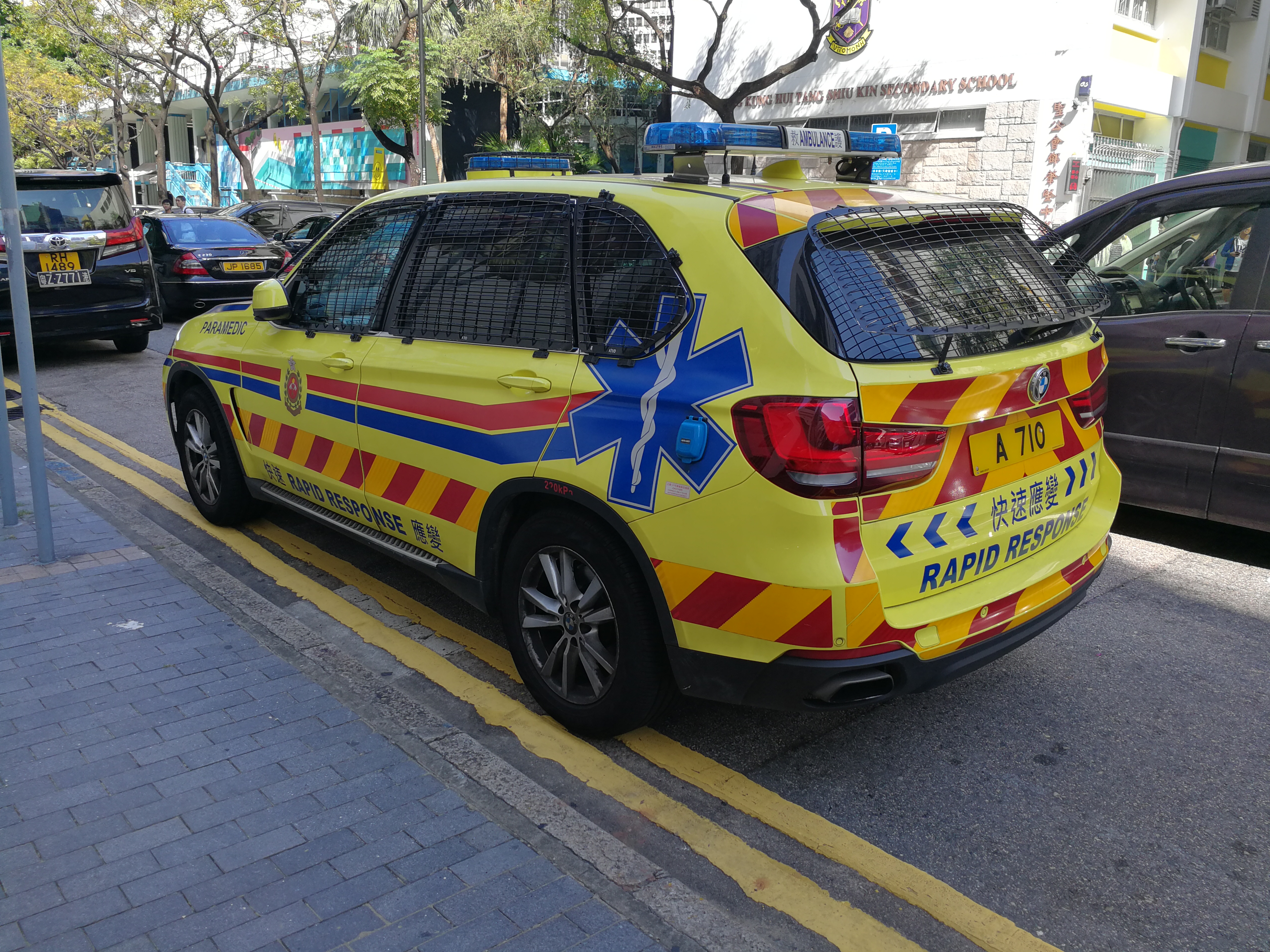
Hong Kong Fire Service rapid response vehicle

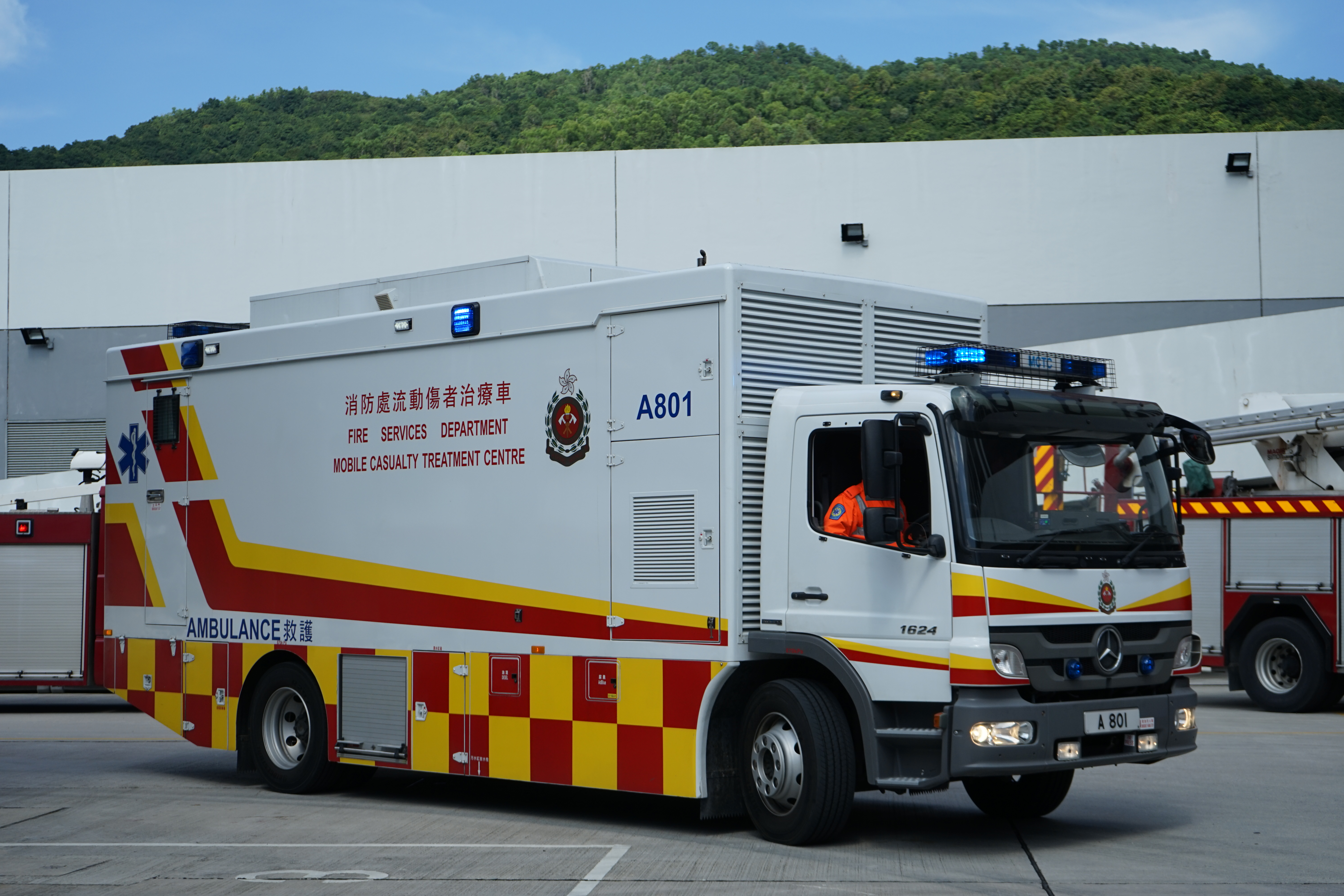
Hong Kong Fire Service mobile casualty treatment centre, a kind of ambulance bus

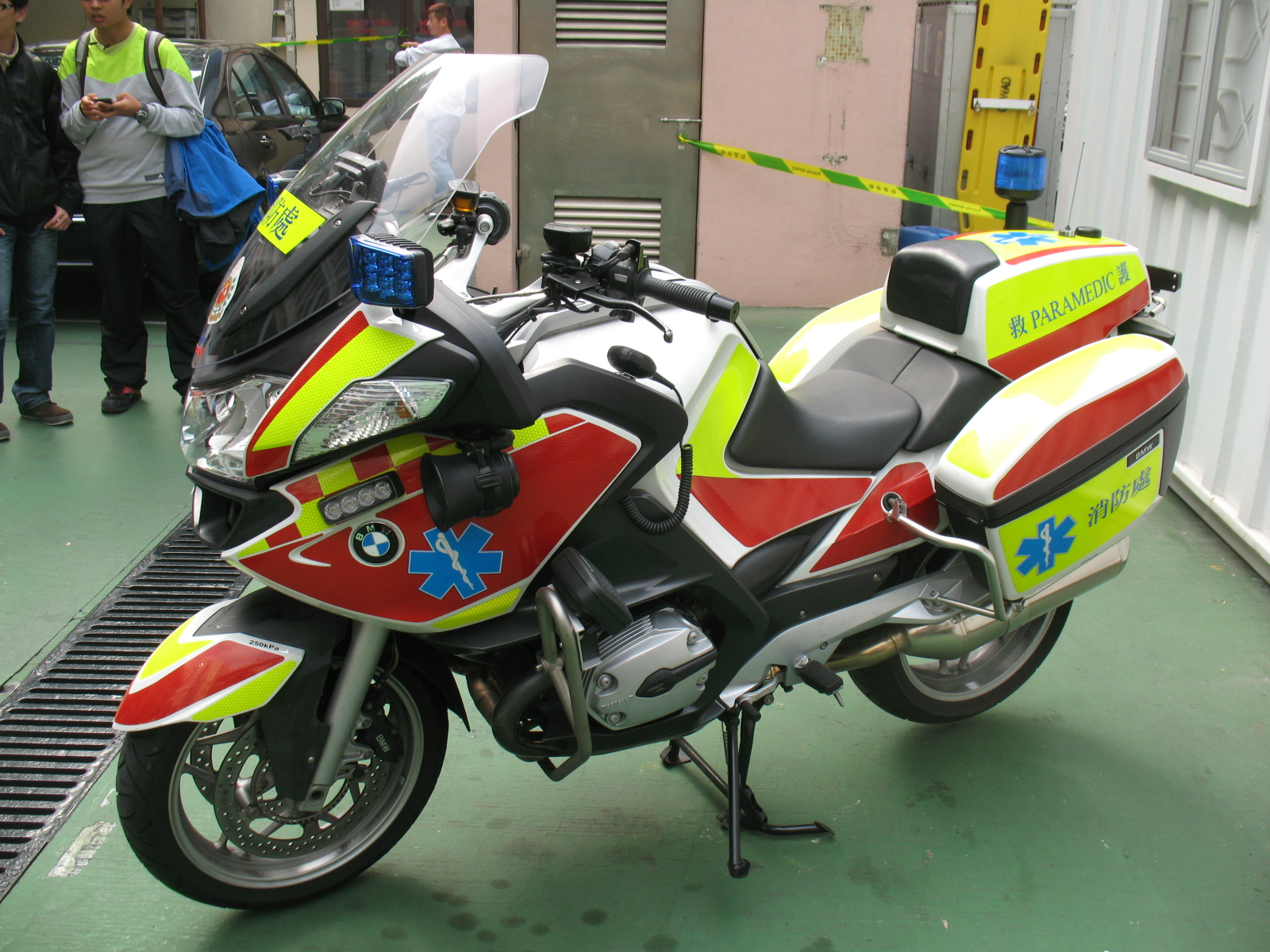
Hong Kong Fire Services ambulance BMW R1200RT

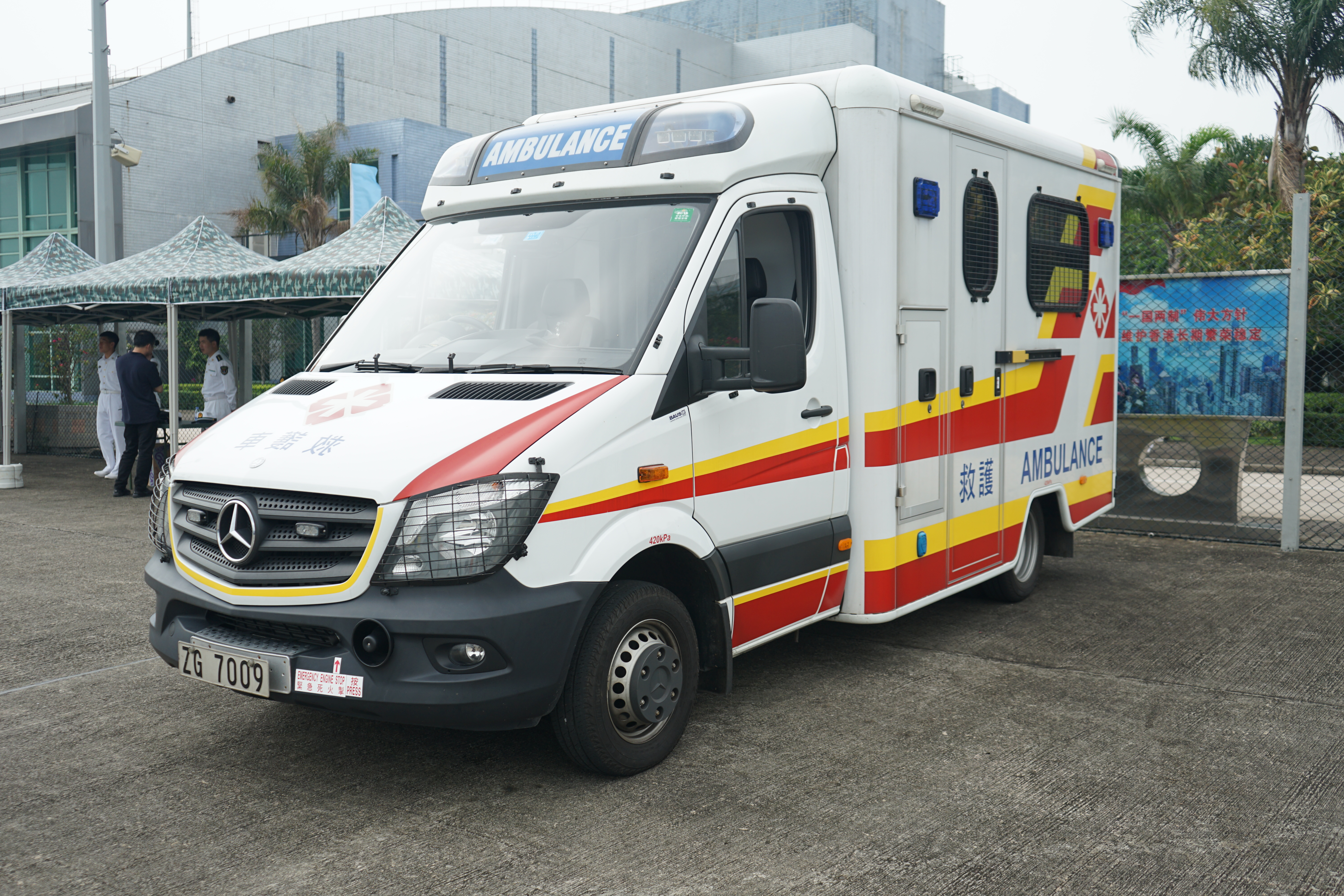
An ambulance of the People's Liberation Army Hong Kong Garrison, in which it also operates its internal medical and sanitary system

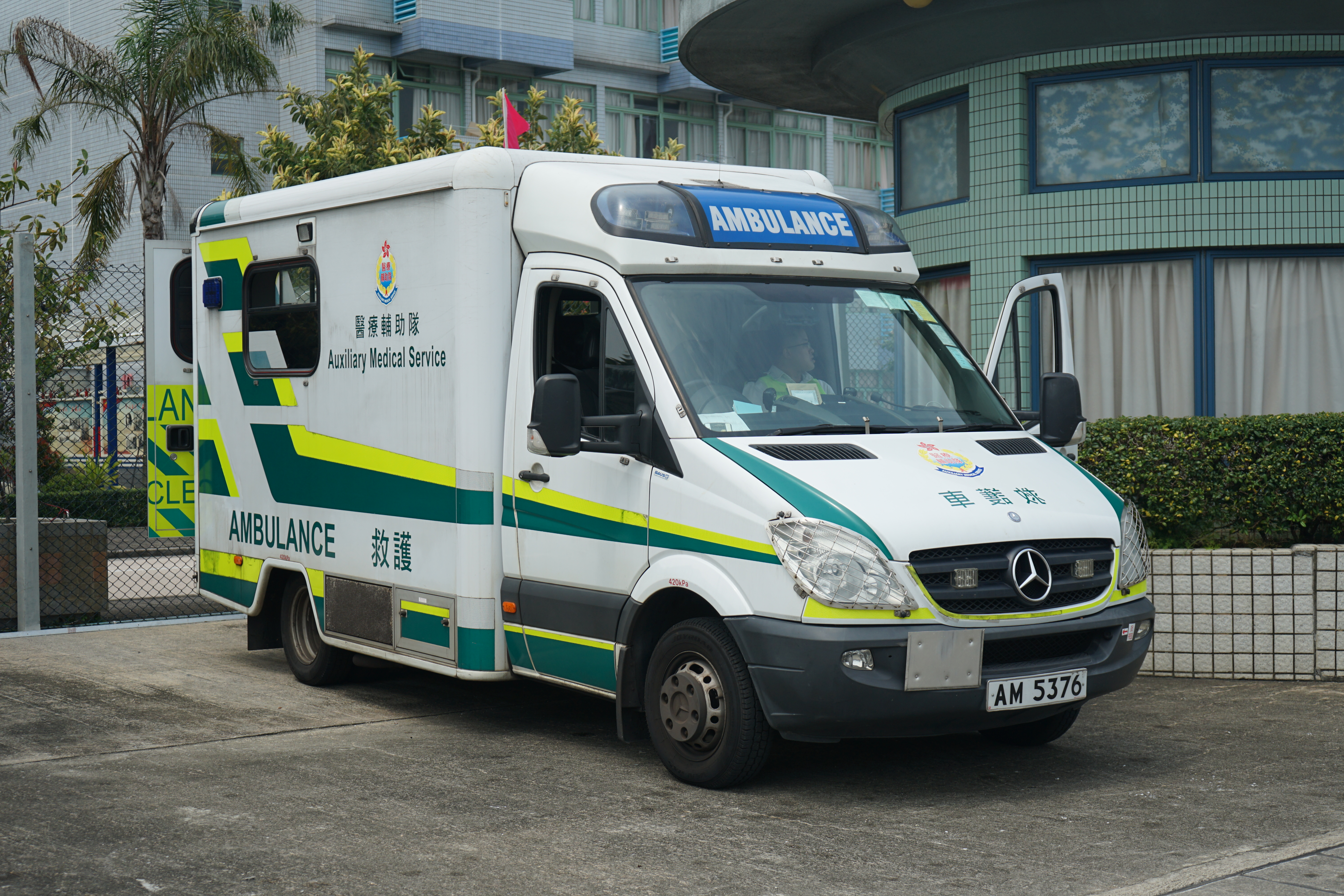
Mercedes-Benz Sprinter (Second Generation) Auxiliary Medical Services Ambulance

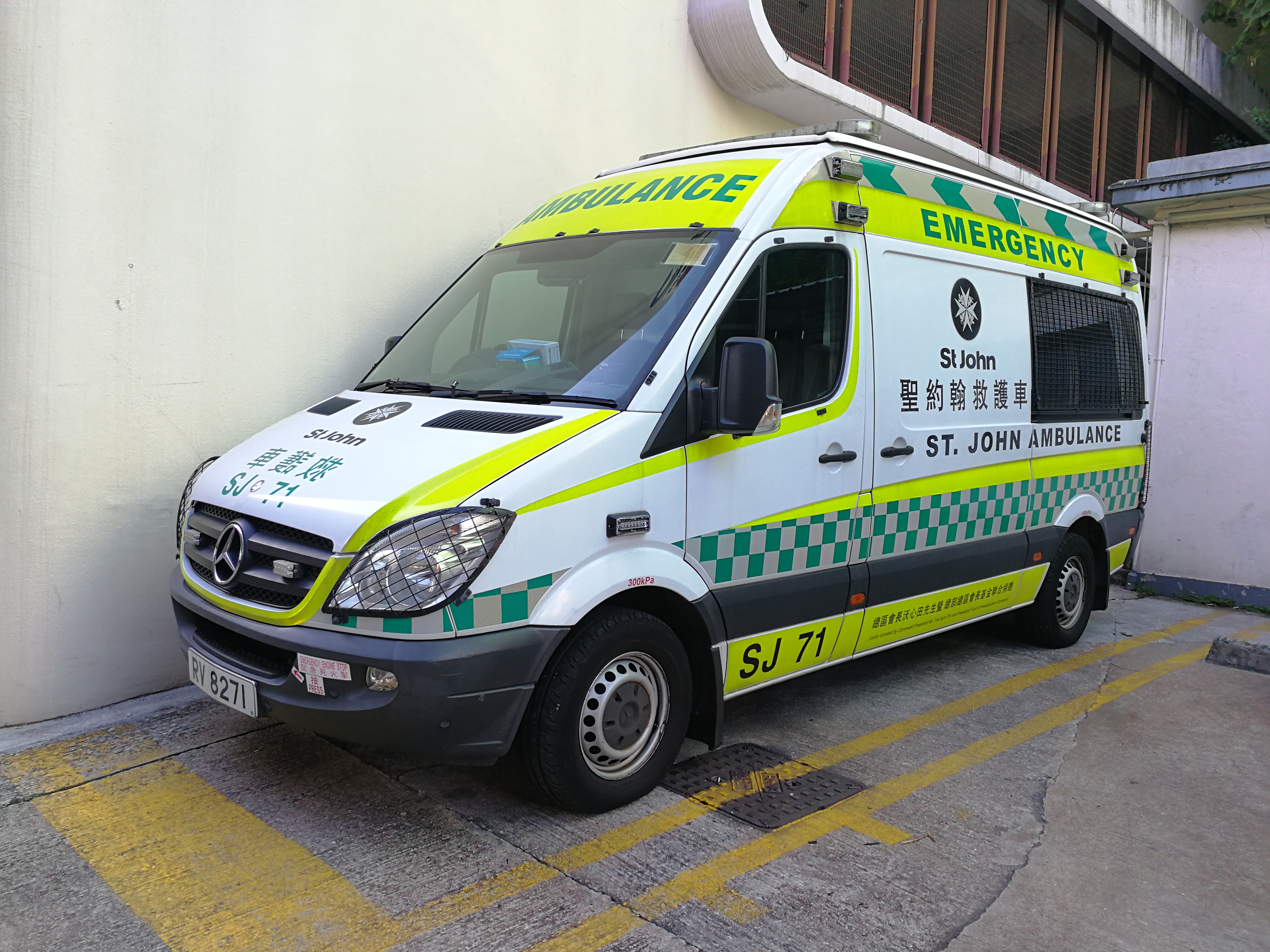
Mercedes-Benz Sprinter St John Ambulance

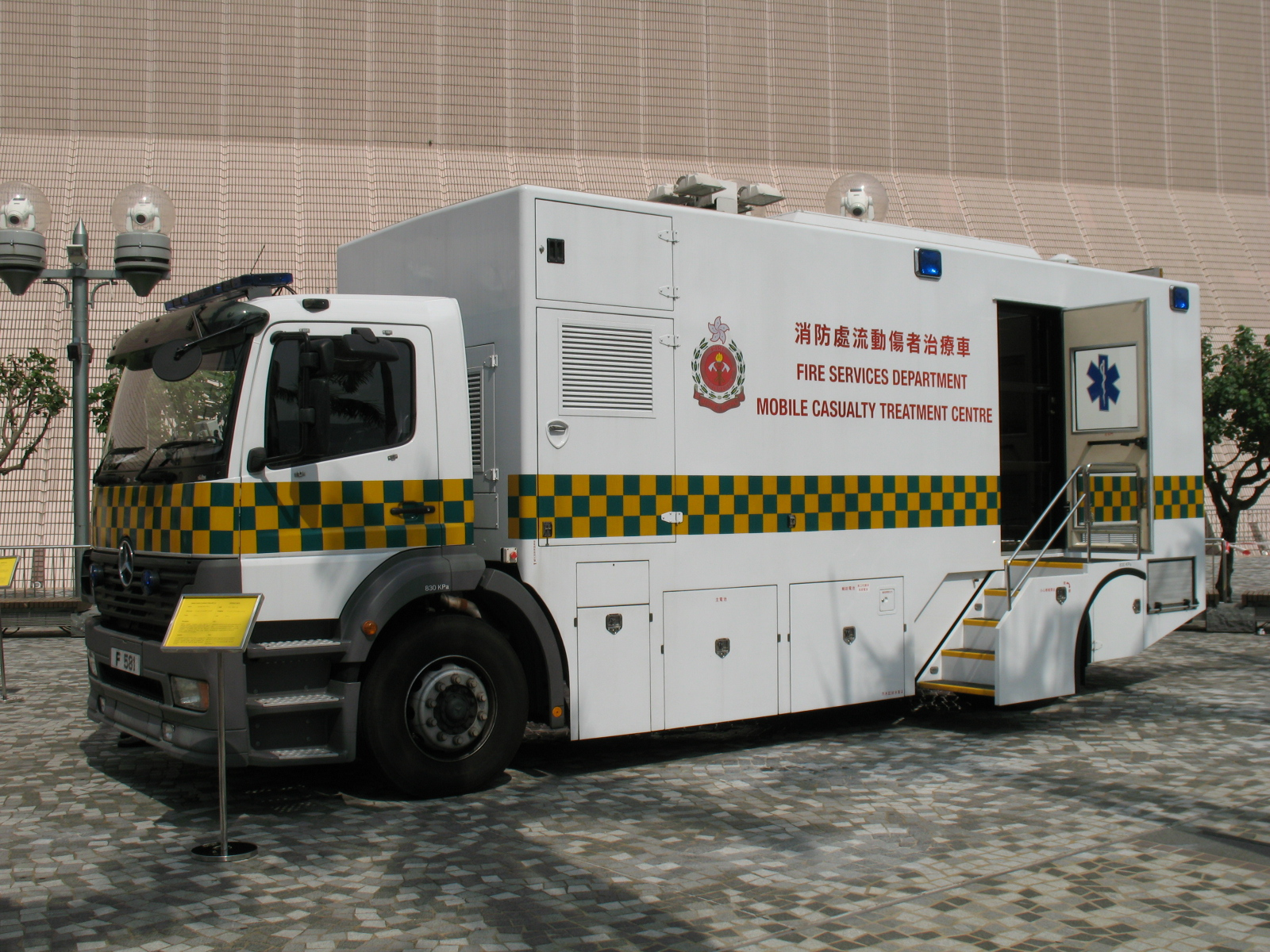
A Mercedes-Benz Axor truck belonging to the Hong Kong Fire Services Department

=== Training and staffing ===
Although the Hong Kong Fire Service maintains that its ambulances provide paramedic service, the current highest level of training is what most would recognise as a US EMT-Intermediate level, including IV therapy, airway management using Combitube, defibrillation, and a limited range of drugs, given orally or by injection. The exact corresponding qualifications are the Canadian province of British Columbia's EMA 1 and 2 levels (EMR and PCP in British Columbia Canada). New recruits for Ambulanceman/Ambulancewoman and Probationary Ambulance Officer undergo 26 weeks of training at the Hong Kong Fire Service Ambulance Command Training School (FSACTS) in Ma On Shan, NT. This provides them with an enhanced Basic Life Support level of training. An additional two weeks of training is provided to motorcycle operators. Once training is completed and a suitable amount of experience is obtained, the candidate will be provided with an additional six weeks of training, elevating them to the Intermediate level. This training is conducted in co-operation with the Justice Institute of British Columbia, and has been granted equivalency. Hong Kong has aspirations to offer full ALS services, and have recently completed a study of how such services are trained and provided internationally.

=== Dispatch ===
As with many things in Hong Kong, the dispatch of emergency vehicles continues to be influenced by the British legacy. The telephone number for emergency services throughout Hong Kong is 999, just as in Britain. All 999 calls are answered by the Hong Kong Police Force. If an ambulance is the only response required, the call is passed directly to Hong Kong Fire Services dispatchers. If the call information is complex, as with a traffic accident, the police dispatchers will notify the ambulance service when they suspect that ambulances might be required. Both ambulances and fire apparatus are co-dispatched by the Hong Kong Fire Service dispatchers. The system operates technologies and decision support software that are approximately equivalent with those found in Europe and North America.

=== Response times ===
The objective of the Hong Kong Fire Service is to have an ambulance on the scene of an emergency within twelve minutes of receiving the request, 24 hours per day. They are currently achieving that objective on more than 93 percent of all emergency calls. The current dispatch system in Hong Kong does not categorise ambulance calls by medical acuity, although there are plans to introduce this measure in the future.

== See also ==
- Corpo de Bombeiros de Macau
- Health in Hong Kong

=== Hong Kong's Emergency Services ===
- Hong Kong Police Force
  - Hong Kong Auxiliary Police Force
- Hong Kong Fire Services Department
  - Auxiliary Medical Services
- Hong Kong St. John Ambulance
- Government Flying Service
- Civil Aid Service
