= Security Branch =

Security Branch may refer to:

- Security Branch (South Africa), a defunct police unit also known as the Special Branch
- Security Bureau (Hong Kong)
- A former name of the Canadian Forces Military Police
