= Auxiliary Medical Service Cadet Corps =

Youth organisation in Hong Kong

- Formation: 2011
- Type: First aid
- Location: 81 Princess Margaret Road, Homantin
- Members: 2100 cadets (2025)
- Official language: Cantonese
- Director: Dr Donald Lam
- Website: www.ams.gov.hk

The Auxiliary Medical Service Cadet Corps (Cantonese: 醫療輔助隊少年團) is a part of the Auxiliary Medical Service of Hong Kong, for young people aged 12–18 years.

== History ==
According to section 21 of Chapter 517 of the Laws of Hong Kong, amended 1999, the Chief Executive may recruit and maintain a youth group known as the Auxiliary Medical Service Cadet Corps, for persons aged over 12 and under 18.

In 2011, the AMSCC was established, receiving a total of 2,200 applications. After a two-round interview, 403 were selected to join the AMSCC, including 235 girls and 168 boys.
