= List of storms named Wendy =

The name Wendy has been used for ten tropical cyclones worldwide, nine in the Western Pacific Ocean and one in the Australian region.

In the Western Pacific:

- Typhoon Wendy (1957) (T5706, 06W)
- Typhoon Wendy (1960) (T6012, 17W)
- Typhoon Wendy (1963) (T6308, 10W, Herming)
- Tropical Storm Wendy (1965) (T6536, 30W, Yeyeng)
- Typhoon Wendy (1968) (T6821, 16W, Lusing)
- Typhoon Wendy (1971) (T7126, 27W)
- Tropical Storm Wendy (1974) (T7422, 26W, Ruping)
- Typhoon Wendy (1978) (T7808, 05W, Emang)
- Tropical Storm Wendy (1999) (T9921, 20W, Mameng)

In the Australian region:

- Cyclone Wendy (1972)
