= Security Bureau (Hong Kong) =

Bureau of the Hong Kong Government

- 保安局

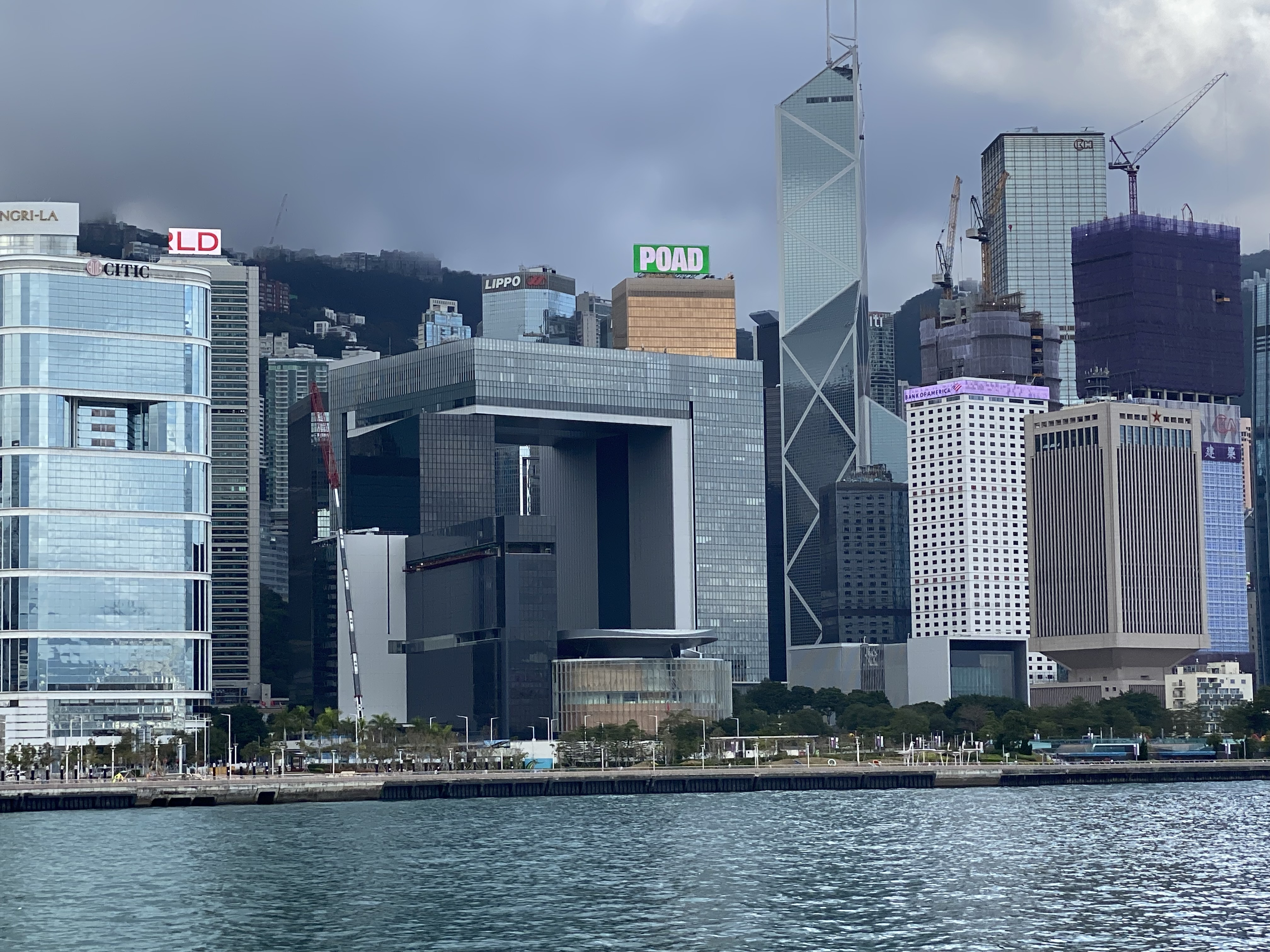
- Headquarters of government offices, including SB, in Admiralty

Agency overview
- Formed: 1973
- Preceding agencies: Defense Branch; Security Branch
- Headquarters: Tamar, Hong Kong
- Minister responsible: Chris Tang, Secretary for Security
- UnderSecretary responsible: Michael Cheuk
- Agency executive: Partick Lee, Permanent Secretary for Security
- Child agencies: Auxiliary Medical Service; Civil Aid Service; Correctional Services Department; Customs and Excise Department; Fire Services Department; Government Flying Service; Hong Kong Police Force; Immigration Department
- Website: sb.gov.hk

Security Bureau
- Chinese: 保安局
- Hanyu Pinyin: Bǎo'ān Jú
- Yale Romanization: Bóu ōn guhk
- Jyutping: Bou^{2} on^{1} guk^{6}

The Security Bureau (Chinese: 保安局) is a policy bureau of the Government of Hong Kong responsible for policies of the maintenance of law and order, exercising immigration and customs control, rehabilitating offenders and drug abusers, and providing emergency fire and rescue services.

The bureau is headed by the Secretary for Security, Chris Tang.

== History ==
=== Pre-Handover ===
In 1941, it was known as the Defence Branch (Chinese: 防衛科), which was responsible for implementing defence policies for British Hong Kong. In 1973, it was named the Security Branch (Chinese: 保安科).

=== Post-Handover ===
In January 2021, a proposal from the government was announced, where information of airline passengers would be shared with the Immigration Department and passengers could potentially be banned from flying. In response to criticism that it could lead to preventing Hong Kong citizens from leaving the city, the Security Bureau claimed that they would not be affected, and that this would only be for "passenger information on flights heading to Hong Kong, rather than departing flights. The right of Hong Kong residents to enter or leave Hong Kong is not affected."

In February 2021, after reports that the Security Bureau worked with the Correctional Services Department to force prisoners with dual passports to declare a sole nationality, the Security Bureau cited mainland China's nationality laws to explain why consular visits to those prisoners with dual passports might be rejected. A spokesman for the British consulate said they were now "seeking answers from the Hong Kong authorities following the suggestion that they may withdraw our consular access to dual national prisoners and prevent us providing the support we have given since 1997."

In 2022, journalists and members of the legal team representing media tycoon Jimmy Lai internationally received threatening messages purportedly from the Security Bureau and the National Security Department. The Hong Kong police issued a statement condemning acts of impersonation and asked for more information from those involved in order to follow up on the incident.

In August 2022, the Narcotics Division of the Security Bureau said it that any amount of THC is illegal in the city. Hong Kong authorities subsequently outlawed CBD, saying that it can be converted into THC and many products came contaminated with the chemical. Whether CBD has medicinal effects is debated.

== Subordinate entities ==
The following public entities are controlled by the bureau:

- Hong Kong Police Force
- Hong Kong Fire Services Department
- Correctional Services Department
- Customs and Excise Department
- Immigration Department
- Government Flying Service
- Civil Aid Service
- Auxiliary Medical Services
- Narcotics Division

== See also ==
- Hong Kong Disciplined Services
- Outbound Travel Alert System
