= Hong Kong Auxiliary Police Force =

Hong Kong Auxiliary Police

- 香港輔助警察隊

Agency overview
- Formed: 1957
- Jurisdiction: Hong Kong (1957-1997); Hong Kong (1997-Present)
- Headquarters: No.12 Wang Chiu Road, Kowloon Bay, Kowloon
- Employees: 4,500
- Minister responsible: Chris Tang, Secretary for Security
- Agency executives: Johnny Leung Sai-kwong, Commandant; (Vacant), Deputy Commandant
- Website: HKAPF Website

Hong Kong Auxiliary Police Force
- Traditional Chinese: 香港輔助警察隊
Transcriptions
Yue: Cantonese
- Yale Romanization: Hēung góng fuh joh gíng chaat deuih
- Jyutping: Hoeng^{1} gong^{2} fu^{6} zo^{6} ging^{2} caat^{3} deoi^{6}

The Hong Kong Auxiliary Police Force (HKAPF) is an auxiliary police force which provides additional manpower to the Hong Kong Police Force, especially during emergencies and other incidents. The Auxiliary Support Bureau under the Support Wing of Hong Kong Police Force, is responsible for managing the HKAPF.

The HKAPF's mandate is governed by the Hong Kong Auxiliary Police Force Ordinance.

== History ==
The Hong Kong Auxiliary Police Force was officially established in 1957 with the merger of the 'Special' and 'Reserve' formations which had been in intermittent existence since the 1880s.

The part-timers were formally established in 1914 as the Police Reserve unit, when numerous full-time officers returned to Europe to fight in the World War I. From 1969 to 1997, the Hong Kong Auxiliary Force was known as the Royal Hong Kong Auxiliary Police Force.

Today the Hong Kong Auxiliary Police Force forms an about 4,500 reserves of manpower to assist in times of natural disaster or civil emergency. Officers are involved in reinforcing daily duties and performing crowd control at public events and festivals. The ability to assist during times of emergency is retained. The Commandant reports to the Commissioner of Police.

== Rank ==
The rank structure of the HKAPF:

- Commandant, HKAPF
- Deputy Commandant, HKAPF
- Chief Superintendent (Auxiliary)
- Senior Superintendent (Auxiliary)
- Superintendent (Auxiliary)
- Chief Inspector (Auxiliary)
- Senior Inspector (Auxiliary)
- Inspector (Auxiliary)
- Station Sergeant (Auxiliary)
- Sergeant (Auxiliary)
- Senior Constable / Constable (Auxiliary)
- Recruit Constable (Auxiliary)

== Command Organization ==
- Operations (Auxiliary)
- Human Resources (Auxiliary)
- Training (Auxiliary)
- Administration and Support (Auxiliary)

=== List of Commandants ===
- Johnny Leung Sai-kwong 2025–current
- Edgar YANG Joe-tsi 2016–2025
- James Yeung-Lung Yiu 2010–2016
- Arthur Kwok Chi-shun 2001–2010

=== Regional Organization ===
- Hong Kong Island (Auxiliary)
- Kowloon West (Auxiliary)
- Kowloon East (Auxiliary)
- New Territories North (Auxiliary)
- New Territories South (Auxiliary)

== Weapons ==
Hong Kong Auxiliary Police Force members are trained in the use of, and issued, the same equipment and weapons same as its regular counterpart.

Weapon	Origin	Type
Smith & Wesson Model 10	United States	Standard issue revolver.
Remington 870	United States	Used in small numbers for security duties.

== Uniform ==
Hong Kong Auxiliary Police Force uniform are the same as those worn by the HKP:

- Uniform Branch: Dark navy blue jacket with the words Police in English and Chinese in reflective white on the front left breast and back. Light blue shirts and white are worn by officers depending on ranks, dark navy blue cargo pants and black caps for all officers. Most HKAP members are armed like members of the regular HKP.

Ranks from constables to sergeant consists of numbers begin with the letter A. Senior officers have "HKAP" at the bottom of their shoulder mark.
