= Outbound Travel Alert System =

Hong Kong travel advice system

- Traditional Chinese: 外遊警示制度
- Simplified Chinese: 外游警示制度
Transcriptions
Standard Mandarin
- Hanyu Pinyin: Wài Yóu Jǐngshì Zhìdù
Yue: Cantonese
- Jyutping: Ngoi6 jau4 ging2 si6 zai3 dou6

Outbound Travel Alert System (OTA System) is a travel advice system for residents of Hong Kong who are travelling overseas. Based on risk assessments by the Security Bureau of the Hong Kong Government, it advises travellers from Hong Kong of the potential risk to personal safety in other countries or regions in the current environment.

== History ==
On 25 November 2008, Thai anti-government protesters of the Thai political crisis rushed into and occupied the Departure Hall of the Suvarnabhumi Airport, which forced the airport to close and cancel all departing flights. Nearly 500 residents of Hong Kong were affected by the incident and were stranded in Bangkok. Two days later, representatives from the Hong Kong tourism industry claimed that the Hong Kong Government had been too passive about the incident, and that the Security Bureau had not issued any travel warnings. The Chinese Government, Macau Government and other countries began to send charters to repatriate their residents from Thailand four days after the incident. However, the Secretary of the Security Bureau announced that Hong Kong would have special arrangements with Cathay Pacific and Hong Kong Express for their residents to return home, after a Hong Kong couple were involved in a car crash on the way from Bangkok to Phuket International Airport.

The Hong Kong Government was accused of being unresponsive, having no sense of crisis and handling the case ineffectively during the incident. The Hong Kong Government and the country's tourism industry held discussions on tourism warning systems; and on 20 October 2009, the Security Bureau established the Outbound Travel Alert System.

== System ==
=== Alert level ===
Warning symbols	Warning Level	Circumstances	Messages to public	Nationals or regions under this level
	Amber 黃色	Signs of threat 有威脅跡象	Monitor situation Exercise caution	Bangladesh; Belgium; Cambodia; Egypt; France; Germany; India; Indonesia; Japan (Areas near the Fukushima Dai-ichi nuclear power plant); Kenya; Malaysia (Coastal regions of eastern Sabah); Myanmar; Nepal; Peru; Philippines; Russia; Saudi Arabia; South Korea; Sri Lanka; Thailand; Tunisia; Türkiye; United Kingdom; United States of America; Venezuela
	Red 紅色	Significant threat 有明顯威脅	Adjust travel plans Avoid non-essential travel	Myanmar (south-eastern regions); Pakistan; Türkiye (South-eastern provinces)
	Black 黑色	Severe threat 有嚴重威脅	Avoid all travel	Afghanistan; Ethiopia; Iran; Iraq; Israel; Lebanon; Sudan; Syria; Ukraine

=== Coverage area ===
The Outbound Travel Alert System covers 85 countries, which are the foreign countries that are the most popular destinations for residents of Hong Kong; other destinations are occasionally added. According to the guidelines of the Security Bureau, Mainland China, Macau and Taiwan are not included in the system.

- Albania
- Argentina
- Australia
- Austria
- Belgium
- Bangladesh
- Belarus
- Bosnia and Herzegovina
- Brazil
- Bahrain
- Brunei
- Bulgaria
- Cambodia
- Canada
- Chile
- Croatia
- Cyprus
- Czech Republic
- Denmark
- Egypt
- Estonia
- Fiji
- Spain
- Finland
- France
- Germany
- Gibraltar
- Greece
- Guam
- Hungary
- Iceland
- Ireland
- India
- Indonesia
- Iran
- Iraq
- Israel
- Italy
- Japan
- Jordan
- Kenya
- Korea
- Laos
- Latvia
- Lebanon
- Liechtenstein
- Lithuania
- Luxembourg
- Macedonia
- Malaysia
- Maldives
- Malta
- Mexico
- Morocco
- Montenegro
- Myanmar
- Nepal
- Netherlands
- New Zealand
- Norway
- Oman
- Pakistan
- Peru
- Philippines
- Poland
- Portugal
- Qatar
- Romania
- Russia
- Saudi Arabia
- Singapore
- Serbia
- Slovakia
- Slovenia
- South Africa
- Sri Lanka
- Switzerland
- Sweden
- Syria
- Thailand
- Tunisia
- Turkey
- United Arab Emirates
- United Kingdom
- United States
- Vietnam

- Except the stated 25 countries or regions, the remaining 60 countries are forced to under the system since 20 October 2009.

== Related services ==
The Immigration Department offers a travel advisory service, known as "Points to Note When Planning Your Trip". Three to four days prior to their journey, residents of Hong Kong can provide their cell phone number and their travel destination and dates. The Immigration Department will then send a text message containing any warnings, advisories or incidents relating to that country prior to the traveller's departure.

== See also ==
- Foreign Affairs Canada – issues travel advice and advisories on their web site to Canadians travelling abroad called Travel Advice and Advisories
