= Auxiliary Medical Service =

Health services provider in Hong Kong

Auxiliary Medical Services
- 醫療輔助隊
- AMS Crest

Agency overview
- Formed: 1950
- Jurisdiction: Hong Kong
- Headquarters: 81 Princess Margaret Road, Homantin
- Employees: 4,745
- Annual budget: $72.0m (Estimate 2012–13)
- Minister responsible: Chris Tang, Secretary for Security
- Agency executives: Dr Lam Man Kin, Ronald, JP, Commissioner; Mr. CHAN Wai Kuen, Chief Staff Officer
- Website: http://www.ams.gov.hk

Auxiliary Medical Service
- Traditional Chinese: 醫療輔助隊
- Simplified Chinese: 医疗辅助队
Transcriptions
Standard Mandarin
- Hanyu Pinyin: Yīliáo Fǔzhù Duì
Yue: Cantonese
- Yale Romanization: Yī lìuh fuh joh deuih
- Jyutping: Ji1 liu4 fu6 zo6 deoi6

Auxiliary Medical Service (AMS) is a voluntary medical and health services provider in Hong Kong. Its mission is to supply effectively and efficiently regular services to maintain the health and well-being of people in Hong Kong.

== History ==
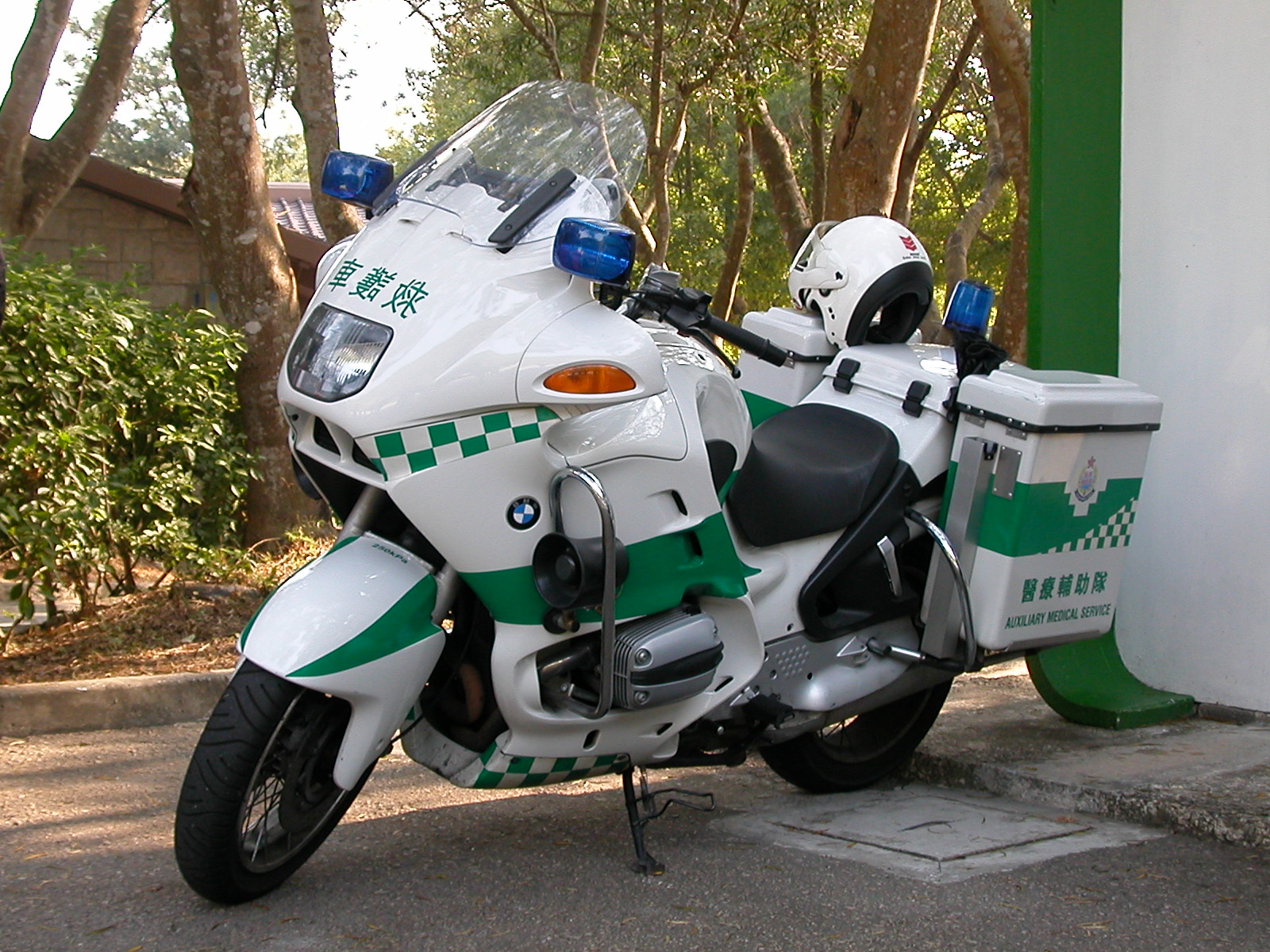
An ambulance motorcycle of AMS (in old colour)

The Hong Kong Government decided to form the Auxiliary Medical Service in order to create a force that could assist the regular medical services during emergencies. The establishment of the AMS was announced in the government gazette on 22 December 1950. In early 1951 the AMS made a call for volunteers, including ordinary people who could be trained as auxiliary nurses, ambulance drivers, and other roles. As the population of Hong Kong swelled with refugees from China in the post-Chinese Communist Revolution years, many lived in substandard housing areas susceptible to fires, landslips, storms, and other disasters, for which the AMS played a role in delivering emergency medical treatment. In the 1950s, AMS worked with St. John Ambulance to establish first aid posts all around the territory. AMS also provides non-emergency ambulance services.

The AMS was involved in major events like the Shek Kip Mei Fire in 1953, Typhoon Wendy in 1962 and landslides caused by heavy rainstorms in 1972. It also served during SARS in Hong Kong in 2003 and 2004 Indian Ocean earthquake. Normally, it sends out volunteers to fireworks displays, marathons, and other major events.

In 1983, AMS became an independent government operation branch under the Security Department of the Government Secretariat. A public hotline for enquiry about the services of AMS and a Non-Emergency Ambulance Transport team were set up in 1995 and 1996 respectively. The Youth Ambassador Scheme has also been implemented in 1997 with the objectives to encourage young people to have a healthy lifestyle and promote a sense of civic duties.

As of 2007, the number of volunteers had grown to 4,418.

== Leadership ==
=== Commissioner ===
(Formerly titled Unit Controller; retitled Commissioner in 1982)

Name	Term of office
Yang Kwok-cheung, CMG	1952–1958
David James Masterton Mackenzie, CMG, OBE	1958–1963
Tang Ping-fai, CMG, OBE	1963–1970
Choi Wing-yip, CBE	1970–1976
Tong Ka-leung, CBE	1976–1989
Lee Shiu-hung, SBS, ISO, JP	1 April 1989 – 1994
Margaret Chan, OBE, FRCP, FFPHM	June 1994–20 August 2003
Lam Ping-yan, SBS	21 August 2003 – 12 June 2012
Chan Hon-yi, SBS	13 June 2012 – 20 September 2021
Lam Man-kin, JP	21 September 2021–present

=== Chief Staff Officer ===
(Head of the civil service establishment of the Auxiliary Medical Service)

Name	Term of office
Tang Nai-pan	Unknown
Lok Cham-choi, MBE	1994–22 June 2001
Luk Wai-hung (Acting)	23 June 2001 – 17 February 2002
Chan Yiu-wing	18 February 2002–September 2012
Hui Wai-kwong	24 September 2012 – 14 June 2019
Wong Ying-keung	15 June 2019 – 23 February 2026
Chan Wai-kyun (Acting)	23 February 2026–present

== Fleet ==
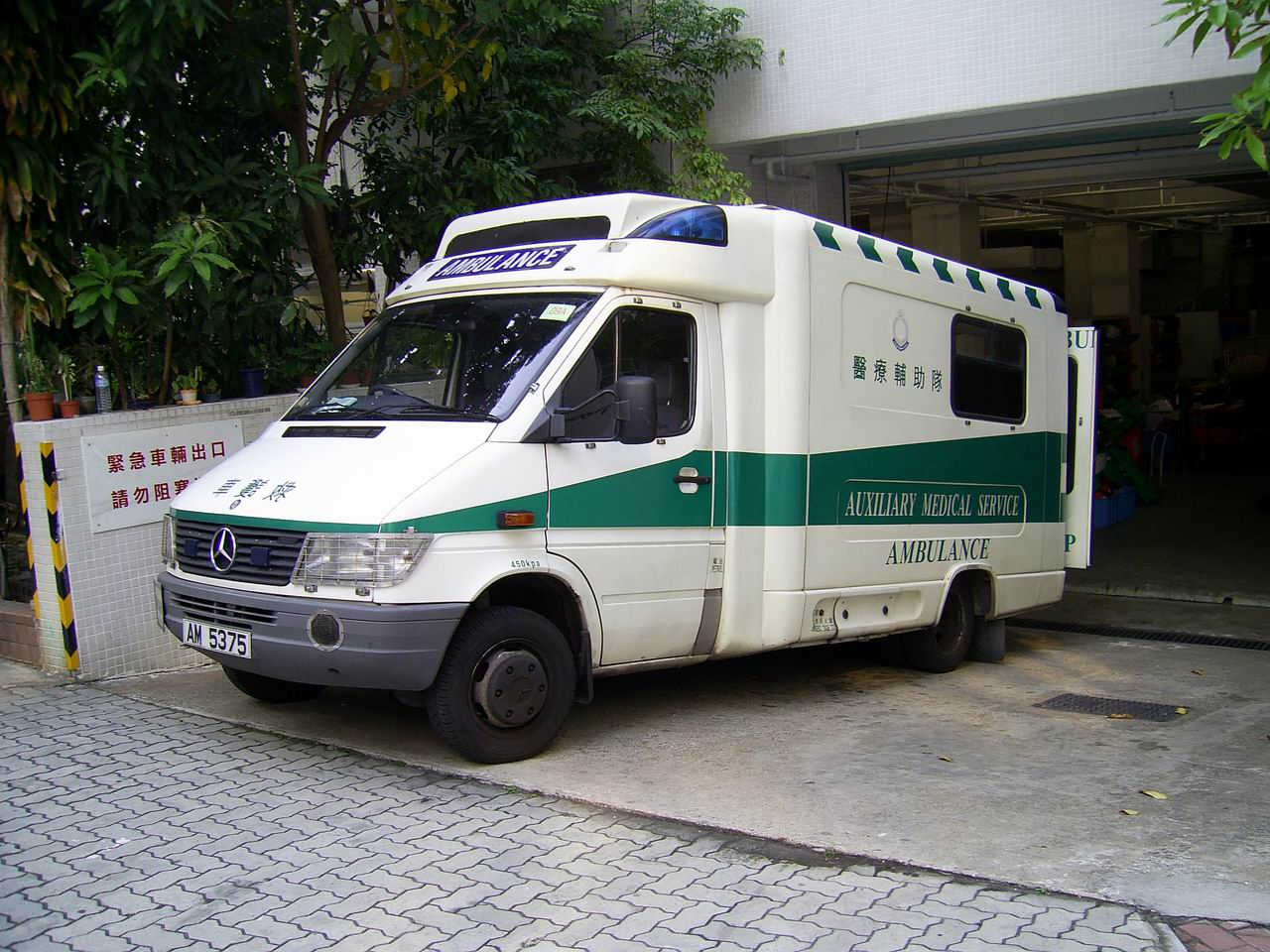
AMS Ambulance (in old colour)

A list of vehicles used in the past and present:

Past

- Land Rover Defender ambulances
- Mercedes-Benz T1 E-310 ambulances
- Toyota Coaster ambulance
- Honda CBX750 motorcycle
- BMW R850RT motorcycle

Present

- Mercedes-Benz Sprinter 516CDI ambulance
- Mitsubishi Fuso Rosa ambulance
- BMW R900RT motorcycle
- Nissan Urvan Mobile Command Post (MCP)
- Merida Mountain Bike (CRU)

== Organisation ==
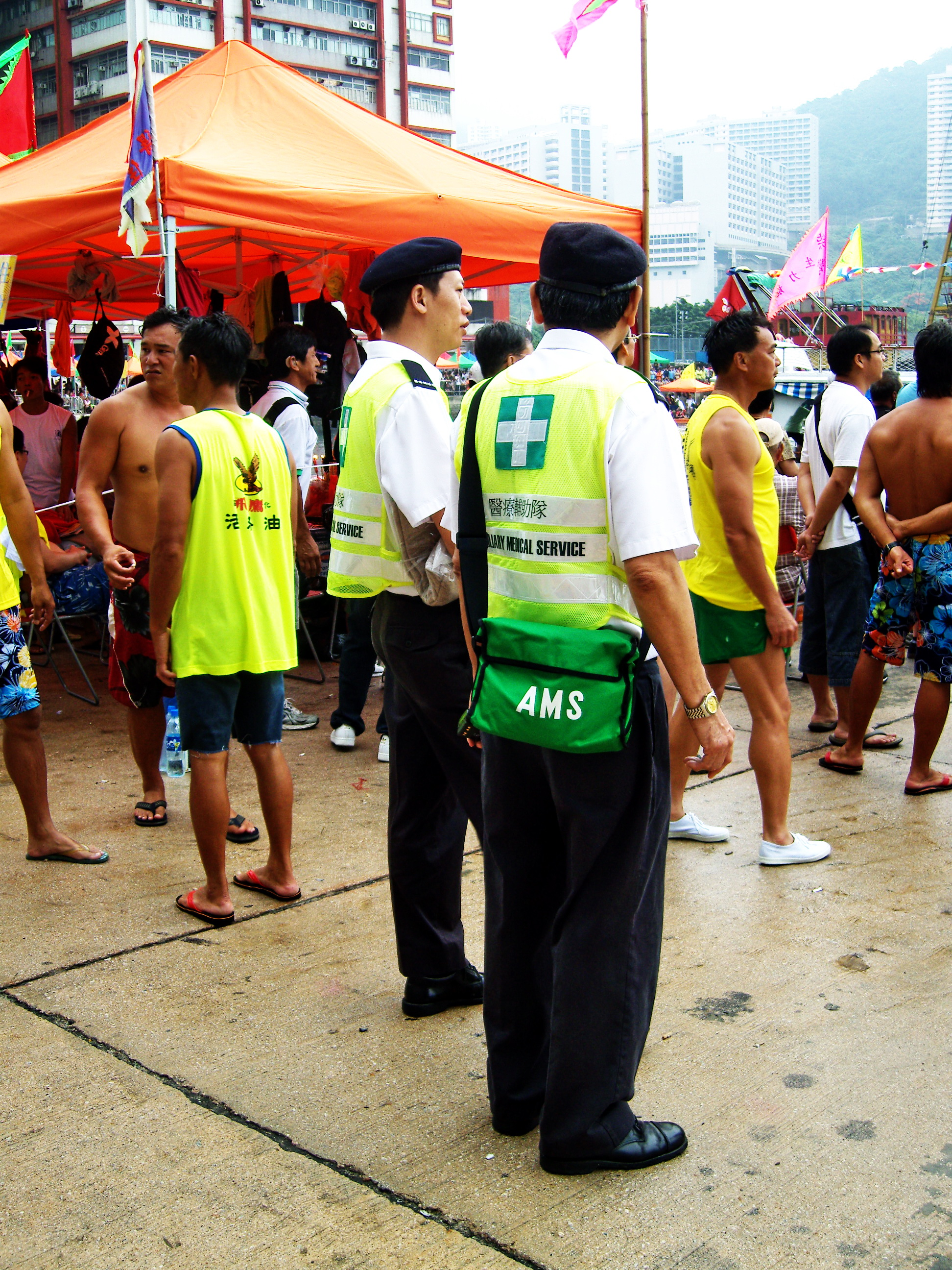
Auxiliary medical team members on duty.

The Auxiliary Medical Service has over 4,700 uniformed members, and is divided into six columns:

- HQ Column
- Operations Wing 1
  - Hong Kong Island Operating Region
  - Kowloon East Operating Region
  - Kowloon West Operating Region
- Operations Wing 2
  - New Territories East Operating Region
  - New Territories West Operating Region
- Training and Development Column
- Medical and Paramedic Column
- Logistics and Support Column

The headquarters column is composed of civil service staff of the AMS.

The operations wings are responsible for frontline work and account for the majority of members.

The training and development column is responsible for providing first aid, evacuation, and infection control training to all members.

The medical and paramedic column is responsible for the Health Protection Section (HPU), Emergency Task Force, and Reserve Personnel Section. Its members are professional doctors, nurses, and professionally trained personnel. In the event of a major incident, the medical and paramedic column will provide personnel to lead in rescue and medical efforts.

The logistics and support column is responsible for the delivery of materials and members to stations and incidents, as well as the welfare of members of the AMS. Public relations and the Band of the AMS are also the responsibility of the logistics and support column.

== Controversies ==
=== 2009 ===
- In 2009, members of the Auxiliary Medical Service (AMS) assisted the Department of Health in administering pneumococcal vaccinations to children at government clinics. Media reports alleged improper injection technique and the incorrect distribution of fever medication, prompting calls for disciplinary review.

=== 2011 ===
- In 2011, a female AMS trainee was found unconscious in a changing room at the Ho Man Tin headquarters while changing into uniform. She was taken to hospital but was later pronounced dead.

=== 2012 ===
- During the 2012 Standard Chartered Marathon, a participant who collapsed and was reportedly without breathing or pulse was transported by wheelchair to a first-aid station. Cardiopulmonary resuscitation (CPR) was initiated after arrival. The participant later died in hospital.

=== 2013 ===
- At the 2013 marathon, AMS personnel were reported to have misapplied automated external defibrillator (AED) electrode pads while treating a runner in cardiac arrest. The runner later died in hospital.

=== 2014 ===
- During duty at the 2014 Occupy Central protests, an injured police officer being transported to hospital reportedly fell from a stretcher from an ambulance to the ground.

=== 2015 ===
- During the 2015 Standard Chartered Marathon 10 km race, a 24-year-old participant collapsed and later died. In 2018, the administrator of his estate filed a negligence lawsuit concerning the emergency medical and ambulance services provided at the event, naming multiple parties including the AMS.
- In July 2015, an AMS government minibus was involved in a collision with a cyclist near Kwong Fuk Estate in Tai Po. The cyclist later died in hospital.

=== 2016 ===
- In 2016, a member of the AMS Cadet Corps died after falling from a height.

=== 2017 ===
- During a 2017 triathlon event, a participant was rescued from the water and handed over to AMS personnel. Media reports alleged that cardiopulmonary resuscitation (CPR) and defibrillation were not immediately administered. The participant later died in hospital.
- In July 2017, a government driver assigned to operate a non-emergency ambulance reportedly attempted suicide at AMS headquarters and was rescued and sent to hospital.

=== 2018 ===
- During the 2018 marathon, media reports alleged delays in ambulance dispatch and emergency response after a runner collapsed. The runner later died in hospital.
- In February 2018, HK01 published an interview with an AMS member who alleged problems in training, deployment and equipment availability, and criticised senior management following controversies related to emergency response at the Standard Chartered Hong Kong Marathon.
- In March 2018, the journalism outlet The Young Reporter (HKBU) reported allegations that AMS oversight and performance monitoring were inadequate, with uneven standards of first-aid practice, amid public scrutiny following the marathon incident.

=== 2020 ===
- During the COVID-19 pandemic, AMS faced criticism regarding the adequacy of personal protective equipment (PPE) provided to frontline members.
- In January 2020, a woman filed a civil claim alleging that ambulance services did not arrive within a reasonable time following an assault at a Lunar New Year Fair in 2017. The Director of the AMS was among those named in the claim.
- In April 2020, amid the COVID-19 pandemic, reports said AMS members working at quarantine facilities questioned a move to lower personal protective equipment (PPE) requirements (including substituting surgical masks for N95 respirators in certain duties), citing infection-control concerns.
- In May 2020, on.cc reported concerns about infection-control practices at AMS headquarters, including the placement and covering of a collection point for potentially contaminated reflective vests in a corridor area.
- In July 2020, Apple Daily reported that an AMS member who later tested positive for COVID-19 had attended a training session where a birthday celebration took place, raising public health concerns and alleged non-compliance with internal instructions on celebrations during training.

=== 2021 ===
- Former government driver incident at Auxiliary Medical Service headquarters In October 2021, a former government driver, aged 38, was found standing on a ledge at the fifth-floor platform of the Auxiliary Medical Service (AMS) headquarters in Ho Man Tin, in what appeared to be a suicide attempt. Police negotiators spent approximately three hours persuading the man to step back to safety. He declined medical treatment at the scene. According to reports, the individual had previously served as a government driver and was associated with AMS volunteer activities, but had recently been dismissed from his government post, which was said to have contributed to his distressed state.

=== 2023 ===
- In 2023, the South China Morning Post reported that between 2017 and 2022, AMS lost nearly 20% of its volunteers (approximately 843 members) while service demand increased by approximately 54% during the same period, largely due to the COVID-19 pandemic.

=== 2025 ===
- In September 2025, a video circulated online showing a man allegedly attempting to remove uncooked food from a restaurant without authorisation. AMS later stated that the individual had previously received training with the service but was no longer an active member at the time of the incident.
- Former Senior Customs Officer Li Kwai-wah convicted over paid outside work with the Auxiliary Medical Service The Independent Commission Against Corruption (ICAC) charged former Senior Customs Officer Li Kwai-wah with using a document containing false statements to apply for paid outside employment with the Auxiliary Medical Service. The case alleged that during the COVID-19 pandemic, she engaged in paid AMS duties while under a “work-from-home standby” arrangement and failed to properly declare the outside work. Li was convicted at the Eastern Magistrates’ Courts and sentenced to 10 weeks’ imprisonment. She was also ordered to make restitution to the Hong Kong Customs and Excise Department.

=== 2026 ===
- On 23 February 2026, the then Chief Staff Officer of AMS, Wong Ying-keung, was arrested on suspicion of indecent assault and later charged with one count of indecent assault. He was subsequently removed from his post and appeared before Kowloon City Magistrates’ Courts on 25 February 2026. Official sources indicated that the deputy director assumed the position in an acting capacity.

== Emergency cycling team ==
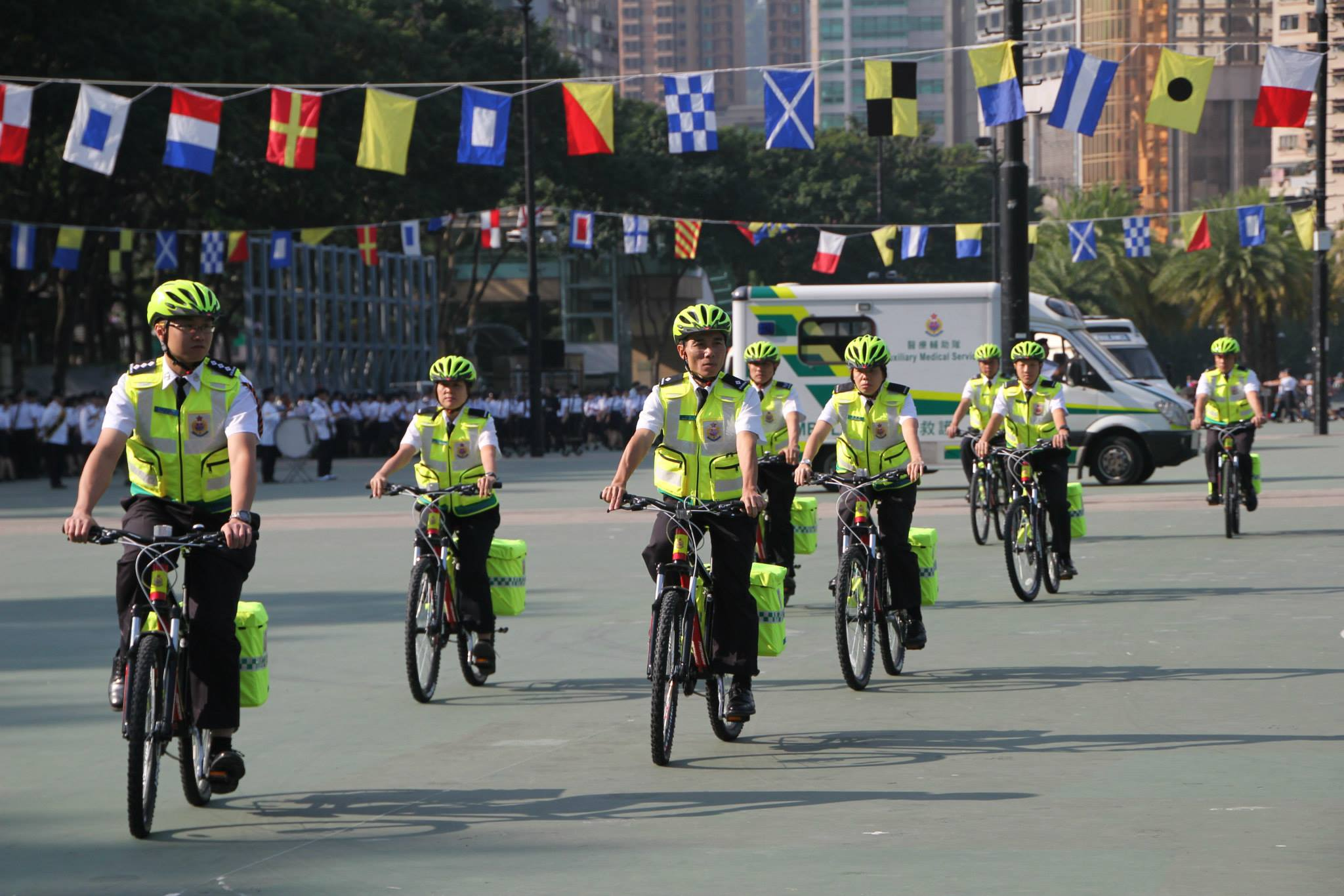
Bicycle Team members during the Commissioner's Parade.

The First Aid Bicycle Team (Chinese: 急救單車隊) was established in 2002. First aid cyclists provide first aid services on Saturdays, Sundays and public holidays for people travelling to Tai Po, Ma On Shan, and Shatin.

The First Aid Bicycle Team is divided into the following sections:

- Shatin Section
- Ma On Shan Section
- Whitehead Section
- Tai Po Section
- Tai Po Seaside Section
- Sheung Shui Section

== Crest ==
Badge of the Auxiliary Medical Service, 1950–1997.

Flag of the Auxiliary Medical Service, 1950–1997.

The current crest of the force was adopted in 1997 to replace most of the colonial symbols on the old crest (c. 1950):

- St Edward's Crown replaced with Bauhinia
- Laurel wreath retained but wording AMS replaced with "醫療輔助隊"
- Motto with wording "Hong Kong" replaced with "Auxiliary Medical Services"

Source: Auxiliary Medical Service (Hong Kong)
