= Civil Aid Service =

Civil organization with emergency roles in Hong Kong

Civil Aid Services
- 民眾安全服務隊

Agency overview
- Formed: 1952; 74 years ago
- Jurisdiction: Hong Kong
- Headquarters: 8 To Wah Road, Yau Ma Tei, Kowloon
- Employees: 112 full time; 3,634 adult members and 3,232 cadet members
- Minister responsible: Chris Tang, Secretary for Security
- Agency executives: Mr.LO Yan-Lai, Commissioner; Mr. Fong Yiu Tong, Francis, Chief Staff Officer (Acting) and Deputy Commissioner (Operation) (Acting)
- Website: CAS

Civil Aid Service
- Traditional Chinese: 民眾安全服務隊
- Simplified Chinese: 民众安全服务队
Transcriptions
Standard Mandarin
- Hanyu Pinyin: Mínzhòng Ānquán Fúwù Duì
Yue: Cantonese
- Yale Romanization: Màhn jung ōn chyùhn fuhk mouh deuih
- Jyutping: Man4 zung3 on1 cyun4 fuk6 mou6 deoi2

CAS
- Traditional Chinese: 民安隊
- Simplified Chinese: 民安队
Transcriptions
Standard Mandarin
- Hanyu Pinyin: Mín Ān Duì
Yue: Cantonese
- Yale Romanization: Màhn ōn deuih
- Jyutping: Man4 on1 deoi2

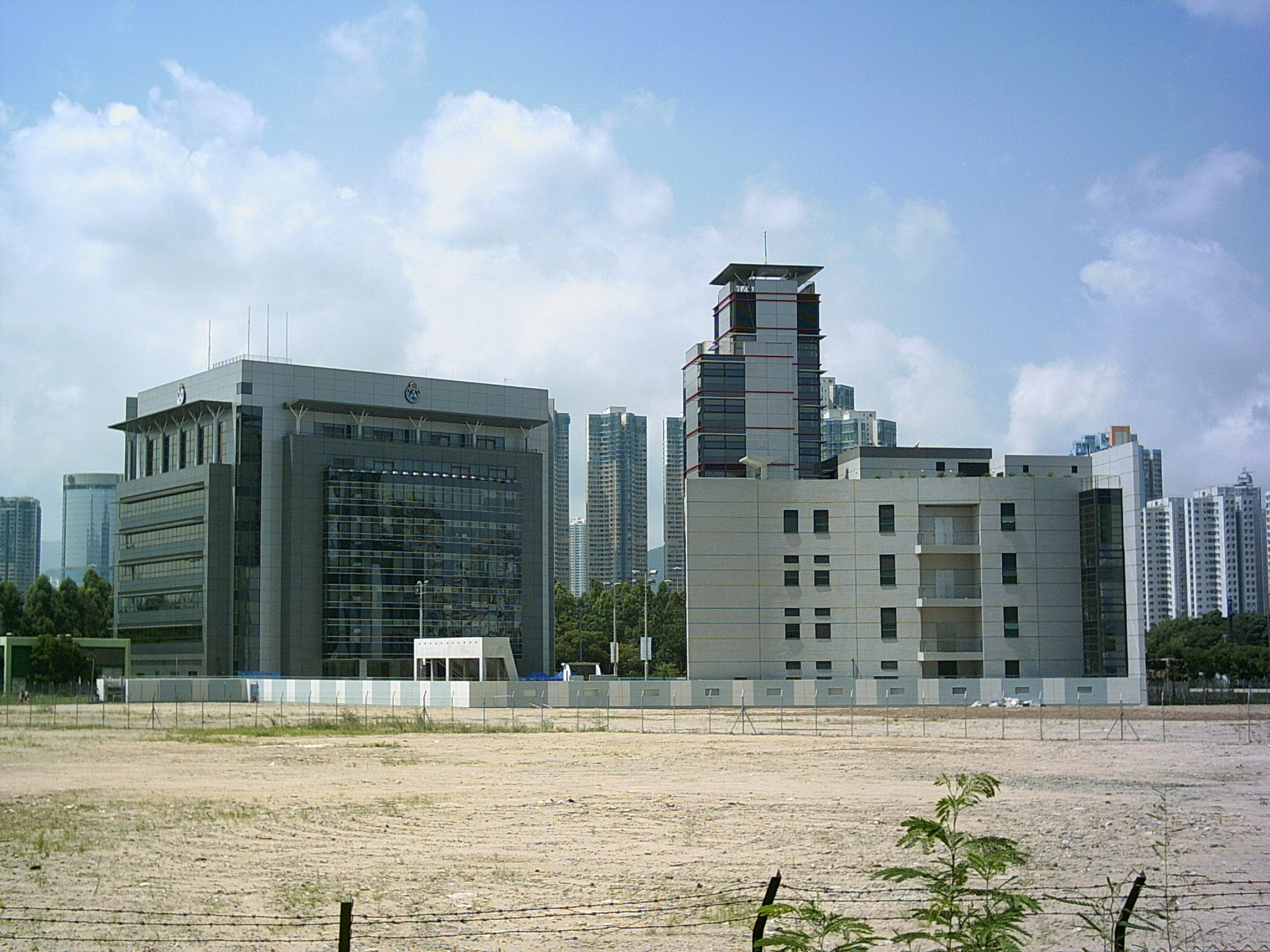
CAS Headquarters

The Civil Aid Service (CAS) is a civil organisation that assists in a variety of auxiliary emergency roles, including search and rescue operations in Hong Kong. CAS is funded by the Hong Kong Government and its members wear uniforms.

== History ==
Badge of the Civil Aid Service, 1952–1997.

Flag of the Civil Aid Service, 1952–1997.

Formed in 1952 under the British colonial government of Hong Kong (CAS Ordinance) and modelled after Civil Aid agencies in the United Kingdom.

As well, a youth section, CAS Cadet Corps, adds 3,232 volunteers to the regular 3,634 force.

The concept was introduced during British rule, an organisation also found in Britain.

A dedicated Civil Aid Service rescue training centre, with indoor and outdoor training areas, was opened by the governor on 15 November 1953 at Hawthorn Road, Happy Valley.

The CAS used to be headquartered at Caroline Hill Road in Causeway Bay. It moved to Yau Ma Tei in 2006. The six-storey former CAS Headquarters is slated for demolition by the government.

== Duties ==
The stated duties of the Service are:

- to provide support to the government regular emergency forces on counter disaster activities, mountain search and rescue, flood rescue, countryside fire protection duties;
- to provide crowd control and management services in major public functions;
- to patrol country parks and hiking trails and to assist people in need of help;
- to stage performances to enhance public attention on major campaigns or activities organised by government departments and non-government organisations;
- to provide training activities and professional services on mountain safety/rescue for government departments and non-government organisations.

== Organisation ==
CAS are headed by the Commissioner and CAS (Department) by Chief Staff Officer (also Deputy Commissioner).

=== Past commissioners ===
- Dr. Ernest Lee SW, SBS, PhD, JP
- Dr. Norman Leung
- The Hon Charles Edward Michael Terry (founding commissioner)

=== Rank ===
- Commissioner (Grade Senior VII Officer)
- Deputy Commissioner - Operations, Administration (Grade VII Officer)
- Senior Assistant Commissioner - Operations, Administration, Development & Youth (Grade VII Officer)
- Regional (Hong Kong, Kowloon, New Territories) / Cadet Corps / Support Force Commander / Administration Force / Tactical Force (Grade VII Officer)
- Deputy Regional / Cadet Corps / Support Force Commander (Grade SVI Officer)
- Assistant Regional Commander / Principal Staff Officer (Grade VI Officer)
- Company Commander / Senior Staff Officer (Grade SV Officer)
- Deputy Company Commander / Staff Officer (Grade V Officer)
- Platoon Commander / Assistant Staff Officer (Grade IV Officer)

Rank Below IV are called "Other Rank Members"

- Chief Section Leader (Grade Senior III)
- Senior Section Leader (Grade Senior III)
- Section Leader (Grade III)
- Deputy Section Leader (Grade II)
- Senior Member (Grade Senior I)
- Member (Grade I)
- Cadet / Senior Cadet / Deputy Cadet Leader / Cadet Leader / Senior Cadet Leader

== Facilities ==
- Headquarters – Yau Ma Tei
- Hong Kong Training Centre – Causeway Bay
- Tai Tan Camp – Sai Kung
- Yuen Tun Camp – Sham Tseng

== Fleet ==
CAS Vehicles is managed by Transport Company. There are various types of vehicles in service for different uses including:

- Motorcycle
- Mobile Command Unit - Toyota Coaster 16 Seats
- Mountain Rescue Vehicle
- Emergency Lighting Vehicle
- Mobile Canteen
- Rescue Tender
- Coaches - Mitsubishi Rosa
- Van, etc.

== Mountain Search and Rescue Company ==
Mountain Search and Rescue Company
- Traditional Chinese: 民安隊山嶺搜救中隊
- Simplified Chinese: 民安队山岭搜救中队
Transcriptions
Standard Mandarin
- Hanyu Pinyin: Mín Ān Duì Shānlǐng Sōujiù Zhōng Duì
Yue: Cantonese
- Yale Romanization: Màhn ōn deuih sāan léhng sáu gau jūng deuih
- Jyutping: Man^{4} on^{1} deoi^{2} saan^{1} leng^{5} sau^{2} gau^{3} zung^{1} deoi^{2}

The Mountain Search and Rescue Company (民安隊山嶺搜救中隊) or CAS MSaR consists of two search and rescue teams specializing in mountain terrain within Hong Kong (mainly in the New Territories). MSaR team is made up of auxiliary members of CAS. Formed in 1967, it has a combined total of 246 members. MSaR works with Hong Kong Fire Services and Government Flying Service (air support) when deployed to incidents.

== Crest ==
The current crest of the force was adopted in 1997 to replace most of the British colonial symbols:

- St Edward's Crown replace with the Bauhinia, Hong Kong's regional emblem
- Crest's unilingual wording CAS Hong Kong replaced with the bilingual "香港 - 民安隊 Civil Aid Service - Hong Kong"
