= Geoffrey Thomas Barnes =

British government official and author

Geoffrey Thomas Barnes CBE JP

Secretary for Security for Hong Kong
- In office 29 February 1988 – February 1990
- Governor: Sir David Wilson
- Preceded by: David Jeaffreson
- Succeeded by: Alistair Asprey

4th Commissioner of the Independent Commission Against Corruption
- In office 1 January 1985 – 28 February 1988
- Governor: Sir David Wilson
- Preceded by: Peter Barry Williams
- Succeeded by: David Jeaffreson

Deputy Secretary for Health and Welfare for Hong Kong
- In office 1981–1984
- Governor: Sir Edward Youde

Deputy Secretary for Security for Hong Kong
- In office 1977–1981
- Governor: Sir Murray MacLehose

Personal details
- Born: 18 August 1932 Malaya
- Died: 11 February 2010 (aged 77)
- Spouse: Agnete Barnes
- Relatives: Kenneth James Barnes
- Education: St Catharine's College, Cambridge

Military service
- Allegiance: United Kingdom
- Rank: Second Lieutenant
- Battles/wars: Malayan Emergency

Geoffrey Thomas Barnes, CBE, JP (18 August 1932 - 11 February 2010) was a British government official, civil servant, military serviceman and author. Barnes held a number of posts in the government of Sarawak and later in the government of Hong Kong, his first major post being the Deputy Secretary for Security, a department for which he would later serve as Secretary in the late 1980s. Barnes also served as Deputy Secretary for Health and Welfare and as the 4th Commissioner of the Independent Commission Against Corruption.

== Early life ==
Barnes was born on 18 August 1932 in Malacca, Malaya to parents Thomas Arthur Barnes and Ethel Maud Walker. He attended Dover College in Southeast England, and went on to study anthropology at St Catharine's College, Cambridge. While at Cambridge, he took part in an expedition to Lake Tana, Ethiopia, an account of which, Into the Blue, was published by Collins in 1955.

== Career ==
=== Early career ===
Barnes served as a government official in the British colonial administration of Sarawak from 1956 to 1963, and remained in Sarawak's government throughout their transition to independence until 1968. In 1970, Barnes joined the government of Hong Kong, where he served as the Assistant Defence Secretary until 1972. Following this, Barnes held the posts of Police Civil Secretary until 1976 and then assistant director for the Commerce and Industry Department until 1977.

=== Deputy Secretary for Security ===
Barnes' first major government position came 1977 when he was promoted to Deputy Secretary for Security for Hong Kong under Secretary Lewis Mervyn Davis. Over his four years in the role Barnes was at the forefront of many of the national and international security threats that faced Hong Kong, most notably, his responsibility in dealing with the exodus of Vietnamese Boat People in 1978–79.

=== Deputy Secretary for Health and Welfare ===
In 1983, Barnes undertook the role as Deputy Secretary for Health, with his tenure being noted for its extensive efforts in improvements in public health. Barnes led the effort to formulate and pass the Smoking (Public Health) Ordinance in 1982, a law targeting smoking bans and the regulation of sales of tobacco products. The law was passed successfully and was received well by both the government and the public. It provided the foundation for multiple amendments and developments in Hong Kong's smoking laws, culminating in an amendment in 2007 which vastly expanded the ban on smoking in most public places. The 1982 law is credited with the long-term reduction in smoking in Hong Kong, with 2015 figures indicating the overall daily smoking rate was 10.5%, a significant decline from the rate of 23.3% in the early 1980s.

=== Commissioner of the ICAC ===
Barnes oversaw a push by the ICAC to identify and deal with corruption in Hong Kong's financial institutions. This led to investigations into allegations of fraud and corruption against more than 20 banks and financial institutions. Barnes said such probes had become a major part of the work of the investigative body, which has police powers of arrest but operates independently of all other police and government offices. Barnes oversaw an expansion of the ICAC's institutional reach, building on its reputation as an effective regional example of dealing with anti-corruption.

=== Later career ===
Barnes later worked as a consultant for the British Foreign & Commonwealth Office, offering insight, advice and expertise on anti-corruption and security measures. Additionally, Barnes also served as the president of the ICAC Association from 1993 until 1998.

== Later life ==
Barnes retired from Hong Kong in 1990 and returned to Surrey, England, with his wife Agnete. During his retirement Barnes took the time to write up his memoirs of his decades working and living in East Asia in the form of two published works: Mostly Memories: Packing and Farewells and With the Dirty Half-Hundred in Malaya: Memories of National Service, 1951–52.

Barnes died on 11 February 2010, at the age of 77 and is survived by his four children: Michael, Andrew, Julia and Robin.

== Publications ==
- "Punan Cemeteries in the Niah River", SMJ, vol.12, pp. 639–645 (1958)
- "Effects of Strong Government Measures Against Tobacco in Hong Kong", British Medical Journal, vol. 292, pp. 1435–1437 (1986), co-authored with Judith Mackay
- Mostly Memories: Packing and Farewells (1996)
- With the Dirty Half-Hundred in Malaya: Memories of National Service, 1951–52 (2001)

== See also ==
- Smoking in Hong Kong
- Vietnamese Boat People

Government offices
Preceded by David Gregory Jeaffreson	Secretary for Security; 1988–1990	Succeeded by Alistair Asprey
Civic offices
Preceded by Peter Barry Williams	Commissioner, Independent Commission Against Corruption; 1985–1988	Succeeded by David Gregory Jeaffreson
