= Smoking in Macau =

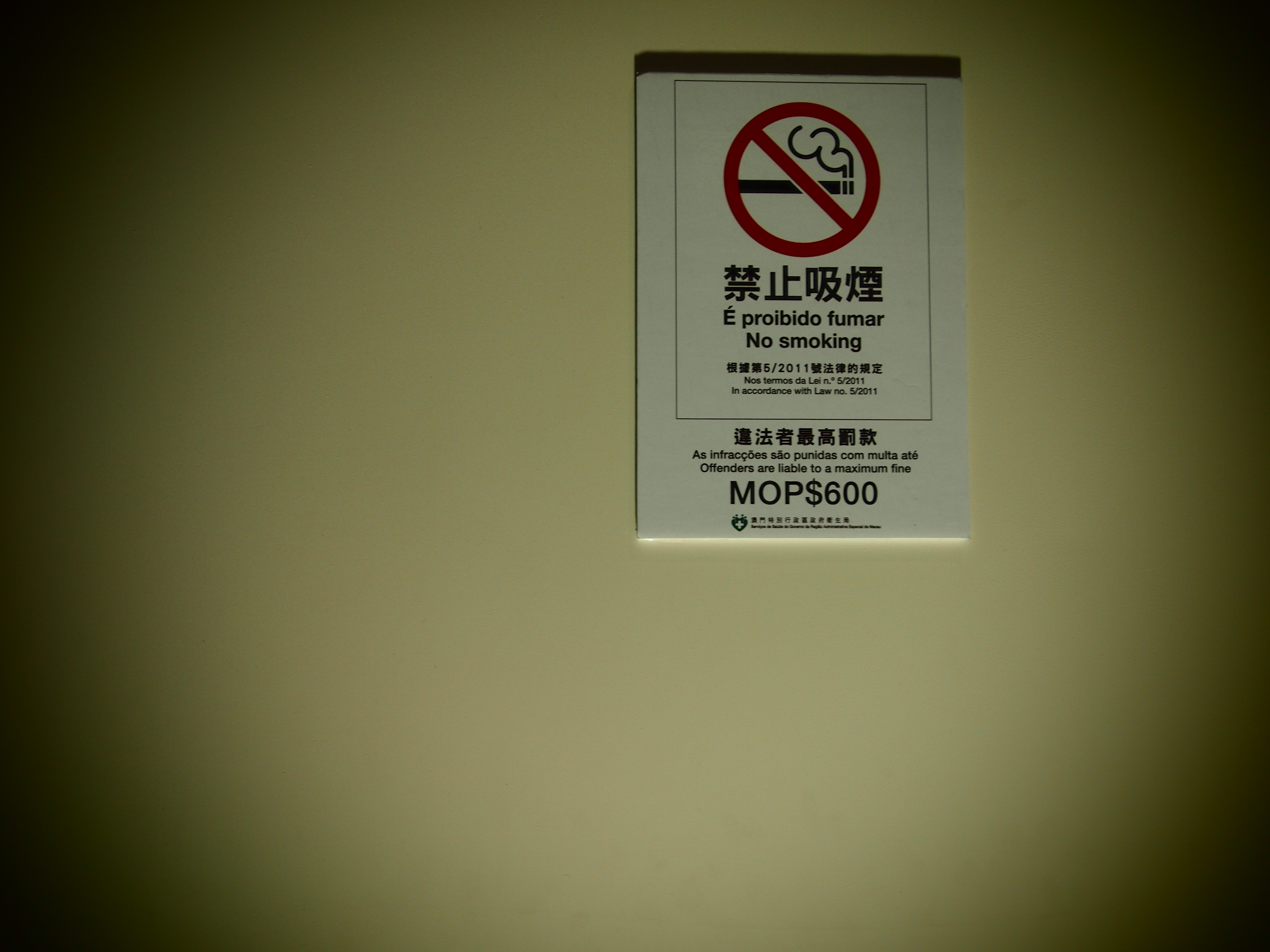
No smoking sign in Macau

Smoking in Macau is regulated more strictly than in mainland China, but not to the extent of the regulation of smoking in Hong Kong.

Smoking is prohibited in a number of places as per Law No. 5/2011.

In May 2009 the government of the Macau Special Administrative Region announced a planned indoor smoking ban for all public places, "to create a fair environment where smokers have the freedom to smoke and non-smokers also have the freedom not to inhale second-hand smoke," Health Bureau director Lei Chin Ion said. In April 2009 the government announced proposed legislation that sought to raise the tobacco taxation by 300%. Casinos and gambling are a major aspect of tourism in Macau. Smoking is banned on the main floors of casinos, but is permitted in closed-off ventilated smoking areas, which are located on the casino floors. A majority of Macau residents support a total ban on smoking in public places, but lawmakers in closed session on 20 April 2010 were unable to reach a consensus regarding a total ban inside casinos. The increasing number of smokers is a cause for concern.

Tobacco products hidden behind a shutter with a government health warning message in a convenience store in Macau

In 2018 a ban on the sale, advertisement and import of e-cigarettes was implemented in Macau. Tobacco products were also banned from display at any points of sale except specialized tobacco shops. Starting in January 2019, following amendments to the 2011 law passed in 2017, smoking in casinos was prohibited except in specially designated smoking lounges.

The overall smoking rate among the Macao population aged 15 years and above decreased from 33.7% in 2011 (upon the implementation of the smoking ban) to 11.2% in 2020.

== See also ==
- Healthcare in Macau
