= Peter Lai =

Peter Lai may refer to:

- Peter Lai (lyricist) (1950–2026), Hong Kong lyricist and actor
- Peter Lai Hing-ling (born 1951), Hong Kong politician
