= Royston Brooks =

British air force officer (born 1936)

Wing Commander Royston Brooks MBE AE

Commanding officer of the Royal Hong Kong Auxiliary Air Force
- In office 1 January 1988 – 13 December 1990
- Preceded by: Wg Cdr Alistair Asprey
- Succeeded by: Wg Cdr Dicky Yip

Personal details
- Born: 9 June 1936 (age 90) Swansea, Glamorgan, Wales
- Occupation: Electrical engineer

Military service
- Allegiance: Hong Kong
- Branch/service: Royal Hong Kong Auxiliary Air Force (RHKAAF)
- Years of service: 1971–1990
- Rank: Wing Commander
- Commands: Commanding Officer of RHKAAF (1988–1990)
- Awards: Member of the Order of the British Empire (Military Division); Air Efficiency Award and clasp

Royston Webb Brooks, MBE, AE (Chinese: 布樂思, born 9 June 1936) is a British electrical engineer and retired air force officer of the Royal Hong Kong Auxiliary Air Force (RHKAAF). He was the last expatriate to serve as the commanding officer of the RHKAAF from 1988 to 1990.

Brooks joined the RHKAAF in 1971 as a part-timer. He was promoted to the rank of squadron leader in 1985 and further promoted to the rank of wing commander upon assuming command of the RHKAAF in 1988. Throughout the years, he had taken part in various search and rescue missions. As the commanding officer, he was in charge of a wide range of flying services and related support services. He also oversaw a partial replacement of the fleet. In view of the transfer of sovereignty over Hong Kong in 1997, he assisted in the preparation for transforming the RHKAAF from a paramilitary air force of the Hong Kong Government into a disciplined unit as the Government Flying Service.

Brooks is a chartered engineer by profession. Having previously worked in Hong Kong for MVE/AEI he moved from the United Kingdom to Hong Kong to continue his career with the China Light and Power Company (CLP), where he worked his way up from a projects engineer to the chief projects engineer of the engineering projects department, and later the divisional manager of engineering of the engineering division. He was responsible for large-scale capital projects including the Castle Peak Power Station. After leaving the CLP and RHKAAF, he resided for a time in the United States before returning to the United Kingdom.

== Biography ==
=== Early life ===
Brooks was born in Swansea, Glamorgan, Wales, the United Kingdom, on 9 June 1936, to Gregory Webb Brooks, brewer and bottler, and Elsie May Brooks (née Jones). After the death of his father, his mother was remarried to Arthur Kirk when she was at 80 in 1992.

Brooks received education at Bishop Gore Grammar School. He then studied engineering at Swansea Technical College (now University of Wales Trinity Saint David) and King's College, Durham University (now Newcastle University).

=== Engineering career ===
After graduation, Brooks embarked on his engineering career and he was qualified as a member of the Institution of Electrical Engineers and a member of the Institution of Plant Engineers. Later on, he was qualified as a chartered engineer and was elected a Fellow of the Institution of Electrical Engineers. Upon the amalgamation of the Institution of Electrical Engineers and the Institution of Incorporated Engineers as the Institution of Engineering and Technology in 2006, he was transferred to the new institution to become a fellow. Over the years, he had published a few articles in the relevant academic publications.

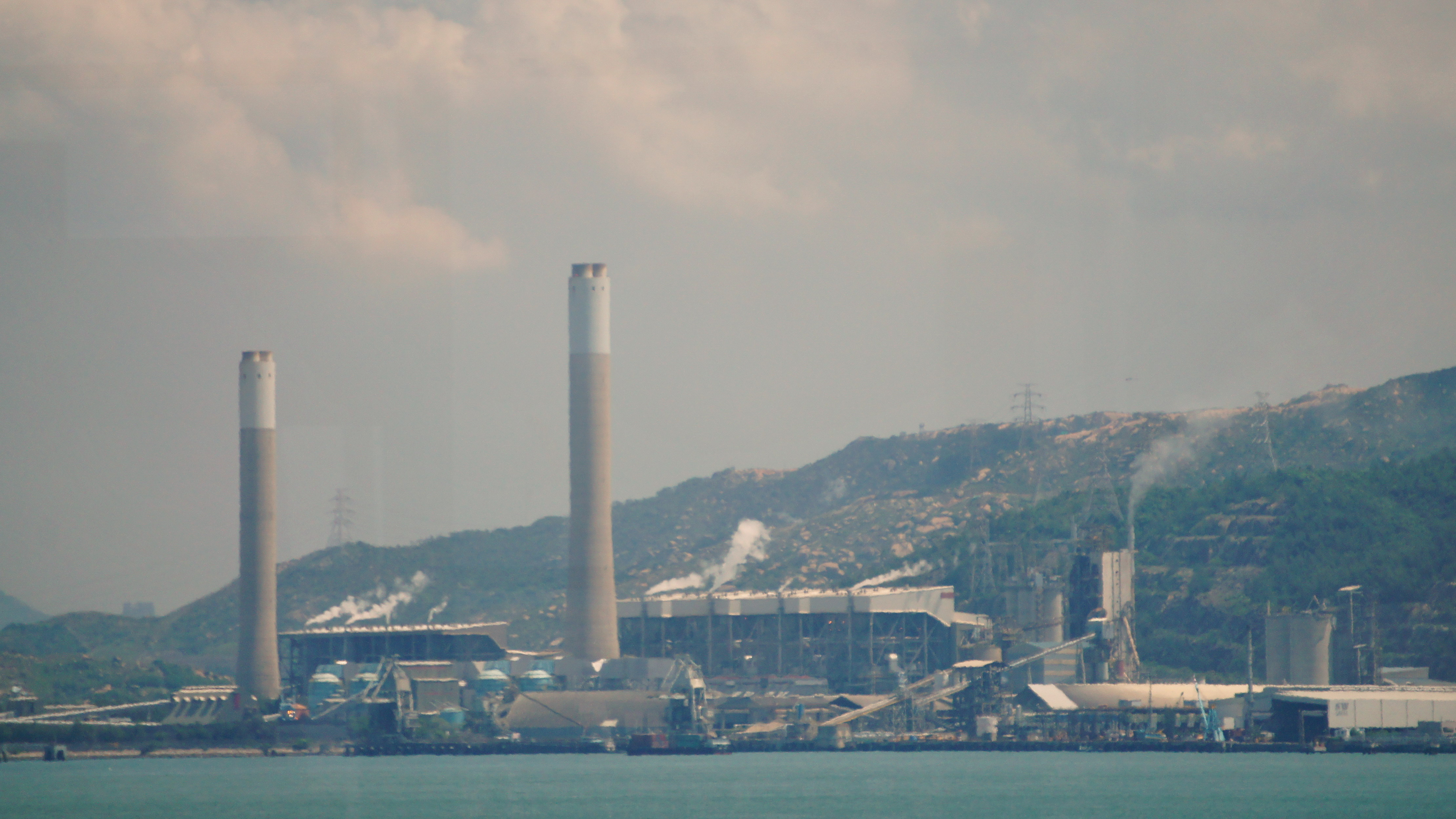
The Castle Peak Power Station was one of Brook's projects

As an engineer, his career was largely associated with China Light and Power Company (CLP) in Hong Kong. In the early 1970s, he was a projects engineer at CLP. A few years later, he became the chief projects engineer of the engineering projects department. By the mid-1980s, he had been further promoted to become the divisional manager of engineering of the engineering division, a post he held until he left CLP in 1988. During his time with CLP, he was responsible for a number of major capital projects, which included the Castle Peak Power Station, the Tsing Yi "B" Power Station and the CLP System Control Centre in Tai Po, etc. While in Hong Kong, he also became a Member of the Hong Kong Institution of Engineers (MHKIE) and was later elected a Fellow (FHKIE).

=== Auxiliary Air Force ===
While living and working in Hong Kong, Brooks joined the Royal Hong Kong Auxiliary Air Force (RHKAAF) as a pilot on part-time basis in 1971, with the RHKAAF having just been restructured as a separate unit the year before. He received the Air Efficiency Award (AE) in 1981, to be followed by a clasp to the medal several years later. In 1985, he was promoted to the rank of squadron leader. Over the years, he had participated in various search and rescue missions. He had also served as an honorary aide-de-camp to the Governor of Hong Kong.

In January 1988, Brooks took over from Wg Cdr Alistair Asprey to become the commanding officer of RHKAAF. On assuming the commanding role, he was promoted to the rank of wing commander. In recognition of his service, he was also appointed a Member of the Order of the British Empire of the Military Division (MBE (Mil)) in the 1988 New Year Honours. The RHKAAF was mainly responsible for providing different kinds of search and rescue services and flying services support. During his time as the commanding officer, it had a total of more than 3,000 hours of flying time each year. It also responded to more than 200 emergency calls and dispatched its helicopters and fixed-wing aircraft for search and rescue operations for around 60 to over 100 times annually. One of the most important rescue operations under his charge occurred on 21 July 1988, when the RHKAAF sent out helicopters to rescue villagers in the New Territories hit by the most serious floods in a decade. Apart from the rescue missions, the RHKAAF continued to provide routine transport services for carrying government officials and guests, conduct offshore patrols in anti-illegal immigration operations, and assist government departments in performing aerial surveys, photography and map-making work, etc.

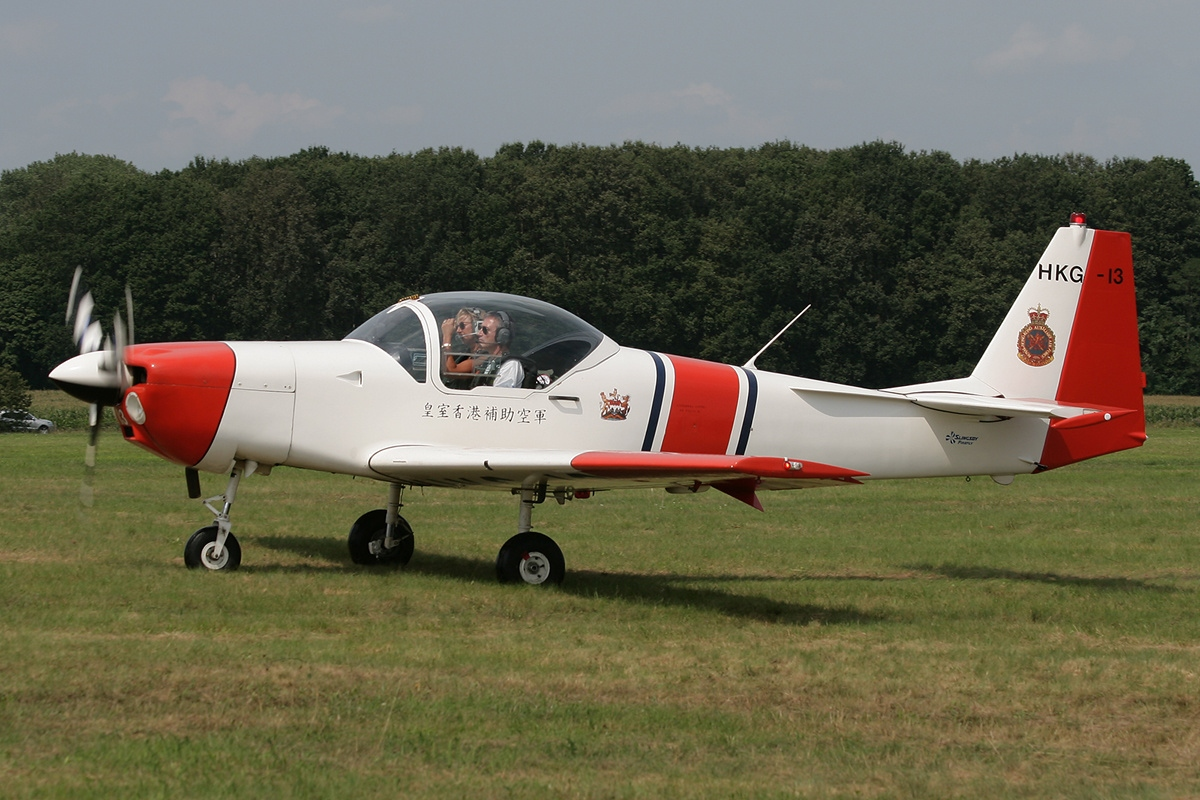
When Brooks was the commanding officer, the RHKAAF procured additional Slingsby Firefly trainers (pictured) for replacing the old Scottish Aviation Bulldog trainers.

When Brooks assumed the commanding post, the RHKAAF operated a fleet of 10 aircraft, including two twin-engined aircraft, one Britten-Norman Islander, two Scottish Aviation Bulldog trainers, two Slingsby Firefly trainers and three Aerospatiale Dauphin twin-engined helicopters. He oversaw a partial replacement of the fleet as arranged by the Hong Kong Government, with a view to modernising the fleet and enhancing the flying services. The replacement work included the addition of two Firefly trainers for retiring the remaining two Bulldog trainers in 1988, and the procurement of six Sikorsky helicopters for replacing the Dauphin helicopters in 1990. Besides, arrangement was originally made in December 1988 to designate the airfield at Shek Kong Barracks in the New Territories for the RHKAAF for training purposes. However, the arrangement was soon cancelled as nearly half of the runway at Shek Kong had been converted into a tented camp for accommodating the Vietnamese boat people by the following year. As the training programme for fixed wing flying could no longer be arranged at the airfield, it resulted in the sending of a total of 12 students to the United Kingdom in three batches for receiving training.

Due to the transfer of sovereignty over Hong Kong in 1997, Brooks witnessed the start of gradual localisation of the RHKAAF and the preparation for transforming it from a paramilitary air force of the Hong Kong Government into a disciplined unit. In October 1988, the Hong Kong Government announced the plan on the setting up of a new government department to be known as the "Government Flying Services". To prepare for the transformation, programmes were carried out to expand the establishment of the RHKAAF and to replace part-time posts by full-time employees. The different military ranks of the personnel of RHKAAF would also be transformed into their corresponding civil service ranks upon the disbandment of RHKAAF. Against this background, the number of permanent staff members of the RHKAAF gradually increased from 127 in 1988 to 160 in 1990, while the number of part-time volunteers like Brooks slightly increased from 171 to 195 in parallel. In 1989, the last remaining Spitfire fighter aircraft of the RHKAAF, which was retired in 1955 and had been on display at the foreground of the RHKAAF headquarters, was transferred to the Imperial War Museum in London for permanent display.

On 31 December 1990, Brooks retired from the post of commanding officer. His successor, Wg Cdr Dicky Yip, became the last commanding officer and the only ethnic Chinese to fill the post. Hence, Brooks was also the last expatriate to assume command of the RHKAAF. In 1993, the RHKAAF was formally disbanded and replaced by the newly established Government Flying Service.

=== Retirement ===
After retiring from the RHKAAF, Brooks moved to Fort Myers in Florida, the United States. After some time, he returned to the United Kingdom and has since then settled in Poole, Dorset, England. In 2011, he set up an unofficial website for the RHKAAF to offer different kinds of reference materials on its history.

== Personal life ==
Brooks was married to Pat Taylor in 1961. The couple have a daughter, Melanie, and two sons, Roger and Gavin.

== Published articles ==
- Brooks, R. W., "China Light & Power's project strategy", IEE Proceedings C (Generation, Transmission and Distribution) Volume 131, Issue 6, September 1984, pp. 222–235.
- Brooks, R. W., and Jesson, J. E., "Phased construction encourages improvements to later units", 1986 International Power Systems, 1986, pp. 29–32.

== Military awards and honours ==
- Air Efficiency Award (AE) (1981)
- Clasp to Air Efficiency Award (AE & Clasp)
- Member of the Order of the British Empire (Military Division) (MBE (Mil) (1988 New Year Honours)

== Professional qualifications ==
- Member of the Institution of Plant Engineers
- Fellow of the Hong Kong Institution of Engineers (FHKIE)
- Fellow of the Institution of Engineering and Technology

== See also ==
- Royal Hong Kong Auxiliary Air Force
- Government Flying Service
- British Forces Hong Kong
- China Light and Power Company

Military offices
Preceded by Wg Cdr Alistair Asprey	Commanding Officer of the Royal Hong Kong Auxiliary Air Force; 1 January 1988–31 December 1990	Succeeded by Wg Cdr Dicky Yip
