= David Jeaffreson =

British colonial government official and civil servant

David Jeaffreson 謝法新

5th Commissioner of ICAC
- In office 29 February 1988 – 30 November 1991
- Preceded by: Geoffrey Barnes
- Succeeded by: Peter Allan

Personal details
- Born: 23 November 1931 United Kingdom
- Died: 30 October 2008 (aged 76) Hong Kong
- Spouse: Elizabeth Marie Jausions

David Gregory Jeaffreson, CBE, JP (Chinese: 謝法新, 23 November 1931 – 30 October 2008) was a British colonial government official and civil servant. He arrived in Hong Kong in 1961 serving as Administrative Officer, and was Secretary for Economic Services and Secretary for Security in 1970s and 1980s, during which he had also been appointed as official Legislative Councillor for more than ten years.

Jeaffreson was appointed as Commissioner of ICAC by Governor Sir David Wilson in 1988. Retiring from the government in 1991, he chose to reside in Hong Kong and had become the deputy chairman of Big Island Asia Limited and an independent non-executive director of Buildmore International Limited.

== Biography ==
=== Early years ===
Jeaffreson was born on 23 November 1931 in the United Kingdom from a well-known surgical family descended from Framlingham, Suffolk, which is said to have performed the first successful ovariotomy in England. Jeaffreson was born to Bryan Leslie Jeaffreson (1896–1953) and Margaret Jeaffreson. His father was a Physician who was qualified as a Medical Doctor, Fellow of the Royal College of Surgeons and Member of the Royal College of Obstetricians and Gynaecologists.

Jeaffreson attended Bootham School in York and then went up to Clare College, Cambridge, obtaining an MA. Upon graduation, called up into the British Army in 1950 to carry out his National Service. He was commissioned as a second lieutenant in the Royal Artillery on 4 November 1950. After almost a year's service with the regular army, he was transferred to the Territorial Army list on 22 October 1951, He was promoted to acting lieutenant on 22 July 1952. He completed his service on 23 September 1955, transferring to the reserve of officers.

In 1955, he joined the Colonial Service and was sent to the British mandate of Tanganyika in East Africa in where he served as Administrative Officer until 1958. From 1959 to 1960, he was employed by Henricot Steel Foundry, becoming an assistant manager.

=== Hong Kong Government ===
In 1961, Jeaffreson joined the Hong Kong Government as an Administrative Officer. He firstly worked in the Department of Trade Industry and Customs under the Finance Branch, and was promoted to the post of Assistant Secretary for Trade and Industry in 1967 and Deputy Financial Secretary in 1972. He became Secretary for Economic Services in September 1976. In this capacity, he oversaw the economic affairs of Hong Kong and occasionally served as acting Financial Secretary. Jeaffreson was appointed Commander of the Order of the British Empire (CBE) in the New Year Honours of 1981 for his public services.

Jeaffreson was Secretary for Security from November 1982 to February 1988 and had briefly served as acting Chief Secretary for Sir David Ford for six days before the end of his term of office. As the Secretary for Security, he was responsible for some sensitive and important issues such as settling the boat people and the introduction of the nationality of British National (Overseas) for Hong Kong. Apart from that, he also paid much attention on issues related to security, crime, the Triads and illegal drugs.

From September 1976 to February 1988, Jeaffreson also served as official Legislative Councillor with the exception of the 1985 to 1986 Session. His ten and a half years' service in the Council was praised by the Governor, Sir David Wilson, and the Senior Unofficial Member of the Council, Lydia Dunn, when he retired from the Council.

On 20 February 1988, Jeaffreson was appointed the Commissioner, Independent Commission Against Corruption (ICAC) by the Governor, succeeding Geoffrey Barnes. During his term, the ICAC cracked down a number of commercial corruption and fraud cases. The ICAC had made a closer cooperation with its counterparts in the People's Republic of China also. Jeaffreson retired from the post on 30 November 1991 and was succeeded by Peter Allan.

=== Later years ===
In retirement, Jeaffreson chose to reside in Hong Kong and joined some business groups. In 1992, he became the deputy chairman of Big Island Asia Limited. On 2 January 2002, he was appointed as independent non-executive director of Buildmore International Limited, a listed landed property company in Hong Kong. Besides, from 1 February 1992 to 31 January 2002, he was a member of the government's Public Service Commission.

In December 2007, along with other former Commissioners of ICAC, Jeaffreson attended the opening ceremony of the new ICAC headquarter in North Point. Jeaffreson died in Hong Kong on 30 October 2008, aged 76. Both the Chief Executive of Hong Kong Donald Tsang and the incumbent Commissioner of ICAC Timothy Tong sent their condolences to the Jeaffreson family.

== Family ==
Jeaffreson married Elizabeth Marie Jausions in 1959. They had two sons and two daughters. His wife, his two daughters and two sons survived him. Jeaffreson lived in Pok Fu Lam, which is located in the Southern District on Hong Kong Island. He was member of the Royal Hong Kong Yacht Club.

== Conferment ==
- J.P. (official, 1963)
- C.B.E. (New Year Honours 1981)
- J.P. (unofficial, 1 July 1998)

== See also ==
- Independent Commission Against Corruption
- History of Hong Kong
- Secretary for Security

== Footnotes ==
Government offices
Preceded by Derek Jones	Secretary for Economic Services; 1976–1982	Succeeded by Piers Jacobs
Preceded by Lewis Davis	Secretary for Security; 1982–1988	Succeeded by Geoffrey Thomas Barnes
Civic offices
Preceded by Geoffrey Thomas Barnes	Commissioner, Independent Commission Against Corruption; 1988–1991	Succeeded by Peter James Allan
