= Alistair Asprey =

Hong Kong government official

Wing Commander Alistair Asprey CBE AE

Secretary for Security
- In office 26 February 1990 – 4 February 1995
- Governor: David Wilson; Chris Patten
- Preceded by: Geoffrey Barnes
- Succeeded by: Peter Lai

Deputy Secretary for Security
- In office February 1989 – February 1990
- Governor: David Wilson
- Preceded by: Robert Upton
- Succeeded by: Ian Strachan

Personal details
- Born: Alistair Peter Asprey; June 11, 1944 (age 81) Jamaica
- Citizenship: British
- Children: 1 son and 1 daughter
- Education: Downside School
- Alma mater: Lincoln College, Oxford
- Occupation: Civil servant

Military service
- Allegiance: British Hong Kong
- Branch/service: Royal Hong Kong Auxiliary Air Force
- Years of service: 1967–1993
- Rank: Wing Commander
- Commands: Royal Hong Kong Auxiliary Air Force (1983–87)
- Awards: Air Efficiency Award

Wing Commander Alistair Peter Asprey CBE AE (Chinese: 區士培, born 11 June 1944) is a former Hong Kong government official who served as Secretary for Security from 1990 to 1995.

== Early life ==
Asprey was born and grew up in Jamaica where his father, Scottish professor of botany Geoffrey Asprey, worked at the University of the West Indies. He attended Downside School in Somerset, England, and subsequently read economics and politics at Lincoln College, Oxford.

== Government career ==
In 1965, Asprey was recruited to the Hong Kong Government as an administrative officer attached to the then-Colonial Secretariat. Asprey was the Clerk of Councils and Assistant Colonial Secretary until January 1970. He served as Administrative Assistant, New Territories Administration until June 1972, when he became the District Officer for Yuen Long. He subsequently served as Senior Administration Officer of the Urban Services Department, the executive arm of the Urban Council. In the early 1980s, he was Deputy Director of Housing (Operations) for the Hong Kong Housing Authority, overseeing resettlement work under the sweeping housing policy of governor Murray MacLehose. He then served as private secretary to governor Edward Youde. In 1986, Asprey joined the Lands and Works Branch as Deputy Secretary for Lands and Works.

In 1988, Asprey was sent to the Royal College of Defence Studies to complete a year-long course on defence studies. In February 1989, he succeeded Robert Upton as Deputy Secretary for Security. At that time, the Security Branch was facing a huge influx of Vietnamese boat people to Hong Kong, with over 32,000 arriving in 1989 alone. Secretary for Security Geoffrey Barnes retired in February 1990, and Asprey succeeded him. As Secretary for Security, Asprey oversaw the detention of tens of thousands of Vietnamese, as well as their screening and repatriation. He faced unresolved issues in the run-up to the 1997 Handover, such as right of abode arrangements and future treatment of fugitive offenders. He oversaw the 1992 transition of border defence from the British Army to the Hong Kong Police Force. Asprey retired on 4 February 1995 and was succeeded as Secretary for Security by Peter Lai.

== Military career ==
Asprey joined the Royal Hong Kong Auxiliary Air Force (RHKAAF) in 1967 as a volunteer cadet pilot, piloting helicopters. He was promoted to Wing Commander and Commanding Officer of the force in 1983. He was succeeded by Royston Brooks in 1988.

Asprey was appointed Officer of the Order of the British Empire (OBE) in 1988 for his role in the development of the RHKAAF. On 1 January 1994 he was made Commander of the Order of the British Empire (CBE).
