= Betel chewing in China =

Type of drug use in China

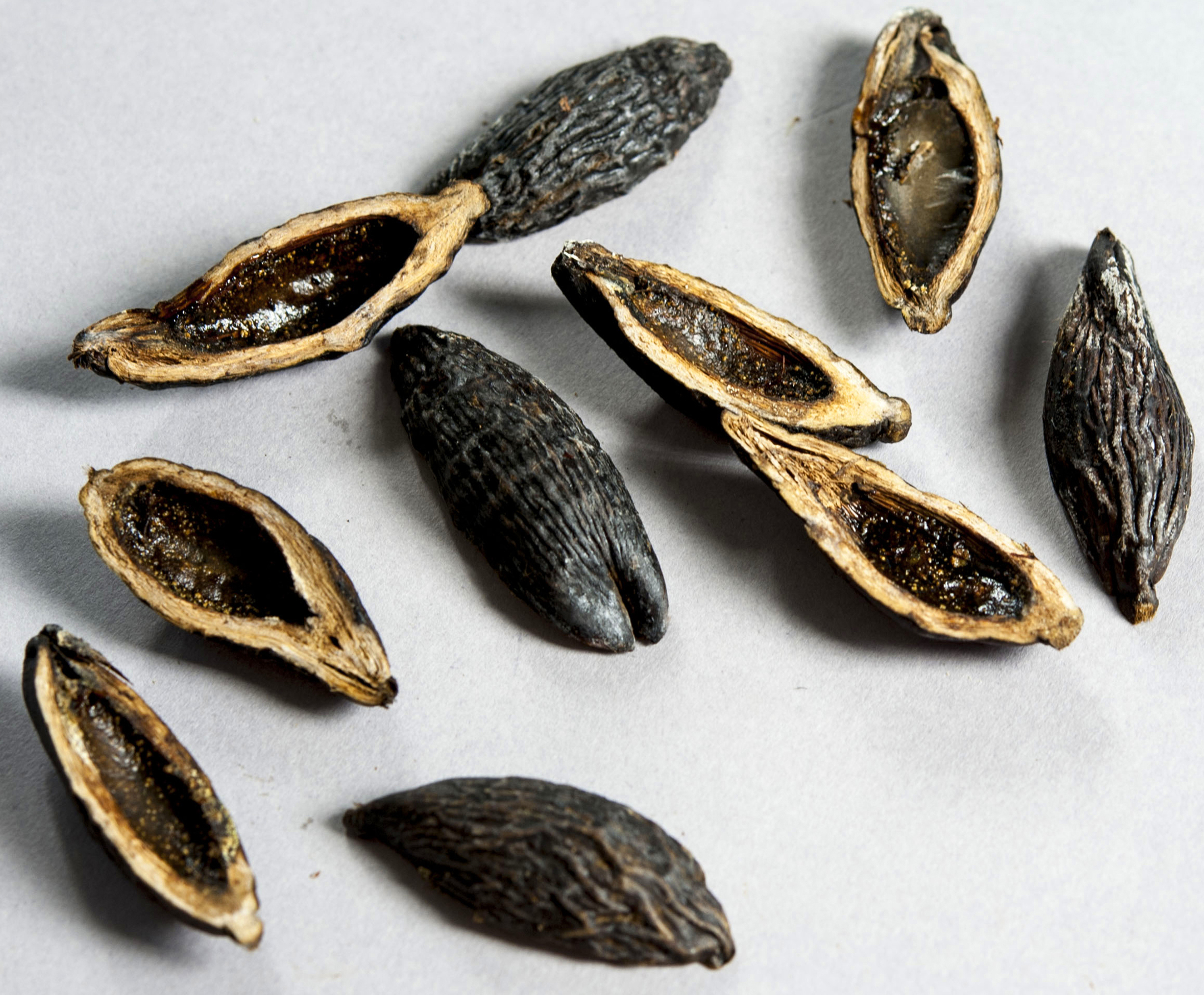
Dried and chopped betel nut, Hunan province

Betel chewing in China has a long history, particularly in the southern provinces. In modern times, betel nut chewing is popular nationwide. The social debate over betel nut chewing has led the Chinese government to introduce some restrictions, although almost all cities still allow the production, sale, and consumption of betel nut.

== History ==
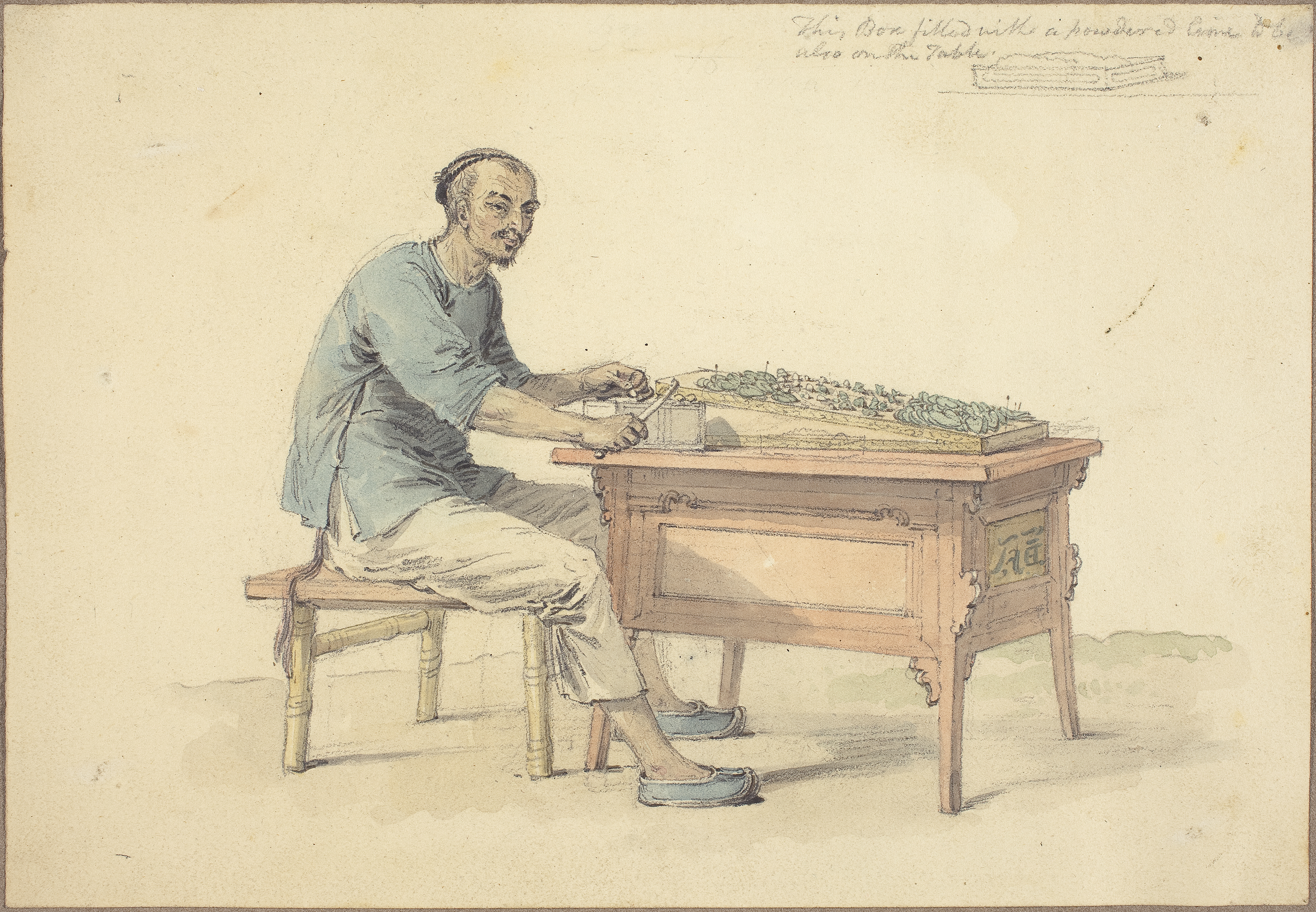
William Alexander's portrait of a Chinese man selling betel nuts

The earliest sources regarding the consumption of betel nuts in China date to the second century B.C., after they were introduced to the region from South and Southeast Asia. In the centuries that followed, betel nuts became known throughout the country. Betel chewing was popular during the Eastern Han and Eastern Jin dynasties, declined during the Sui and Tang dynasties, and became popular again during the Qing dynasty. Betel nuts were introduced into Hunan, the biggest consumer of betel nuts, more than 300 years ago and embedded in the social culture of the region that they were listed as a provincial-level cultural heritage in 2016. The Opium Wars and the Taiping Rebellion destabilized the national betel nut trade. Betel nut chewing would not experience a resurgence until the reform and opening up period. In modern China, betel chewing is regarded as a symbol of the manual labourer due to social polarization.

Areca nuts are also a part of traditional Chinese medicine and are believed to improve the intestinal tract or help someone feel less cold. Betel nut is also used as an offering in Buddhist rituals and to express love.

== Production and popularity ==
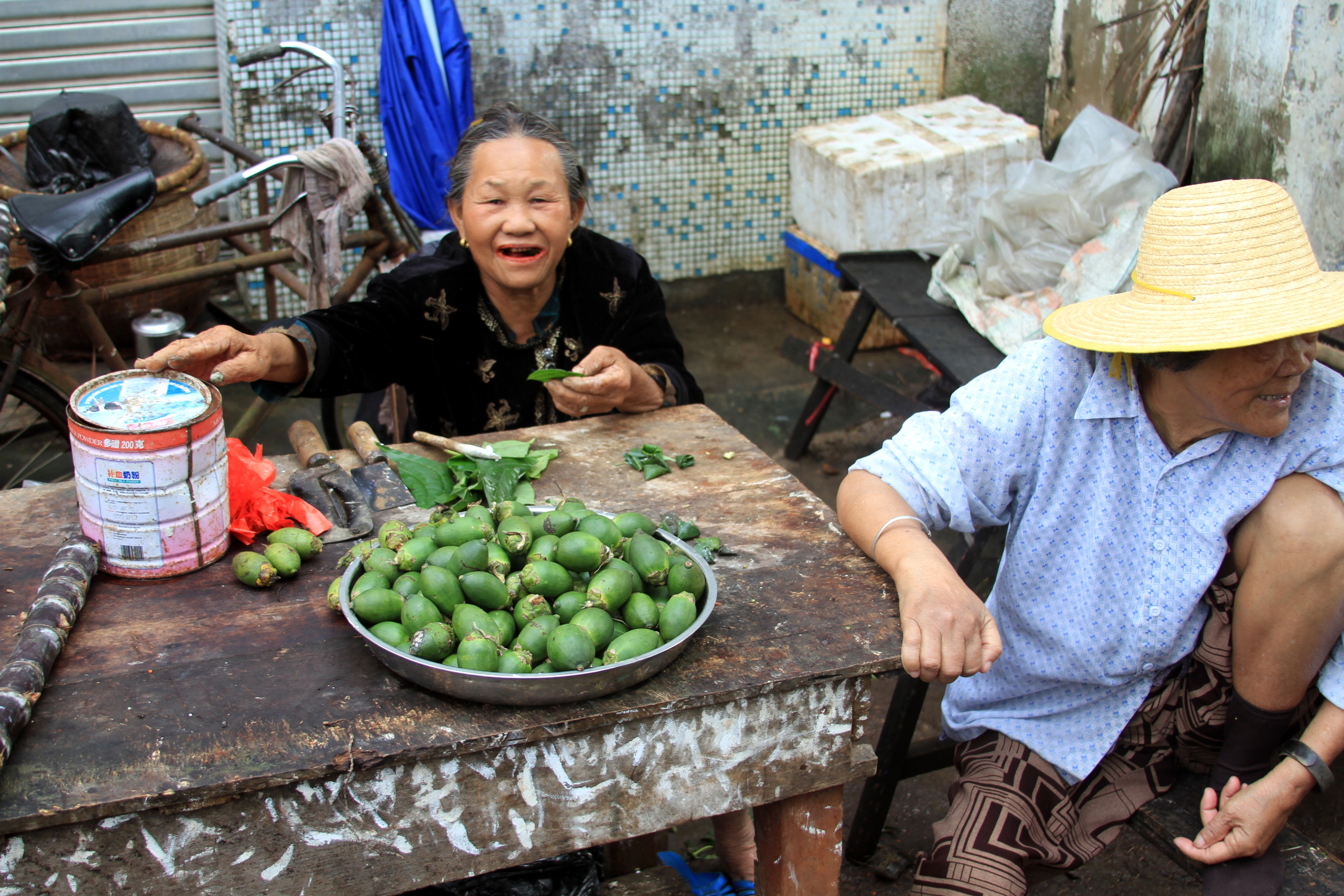
Areca nuts as sold in Hainan, China

Betel nut is grown mostly in Hainan and is processed in Hunan. Hainan province is home to over 95 percent of the country's betel nut planting area, and millions of farmers rely on the industry as their main source of income. China also imports betel nuts from India.

Production of betel in Hainan by year 2000–2021
Year	Production (in 10,000 tons)
2000	3.56
2005	6.43
2010	15.21
2015	22.92
2016	23.42
2017	25.51
2018	27.22
2019	28.70
2020	28.33
2021	27.88

By 2018, there were more than 60 million Chinese chewing the nuts, and the nut consumers exceeded 100 million in 2021. There are some 260,000 betel nut companies in China. From 2011 to 2018, the output value of China's betel nut industry increased from 55.8 billion yuan to 78.1 billion yuan. Chewing betel nut is most rife in more southern provinces, like Hunan, Hainan and Guizhou. A survey of 1,305 pupils and middle school students in the Hunan city of Xiangtan found that nearly 70 percent of the respondents admitted they had tried betel nuts and 8.4 percent of them said they chew them every day. The chewing rate of betel nuts among residents in Hunan was 38.40 percent in 2011. The value of betel nut production in Hunan was estimated at 30 billion yuan and growing. According to Cao Yu, a lecturer at Jinan University, the latter-day popularity of betel nuts in China is a product of the mutual influence of three stakeholders that industry, local governments, and the public.

== Controversy and legislation ==
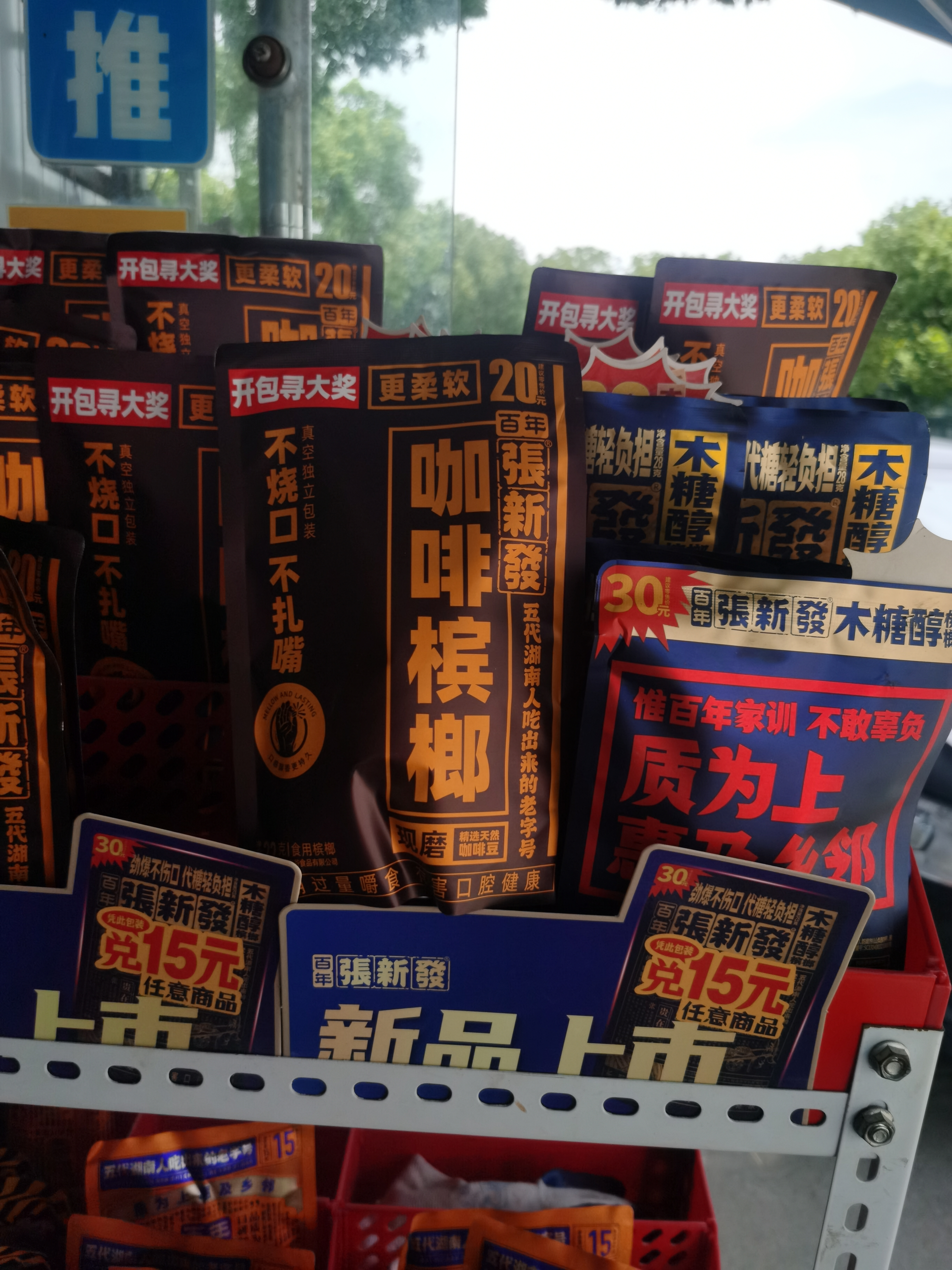
Betel nuts at a store in Suzhou

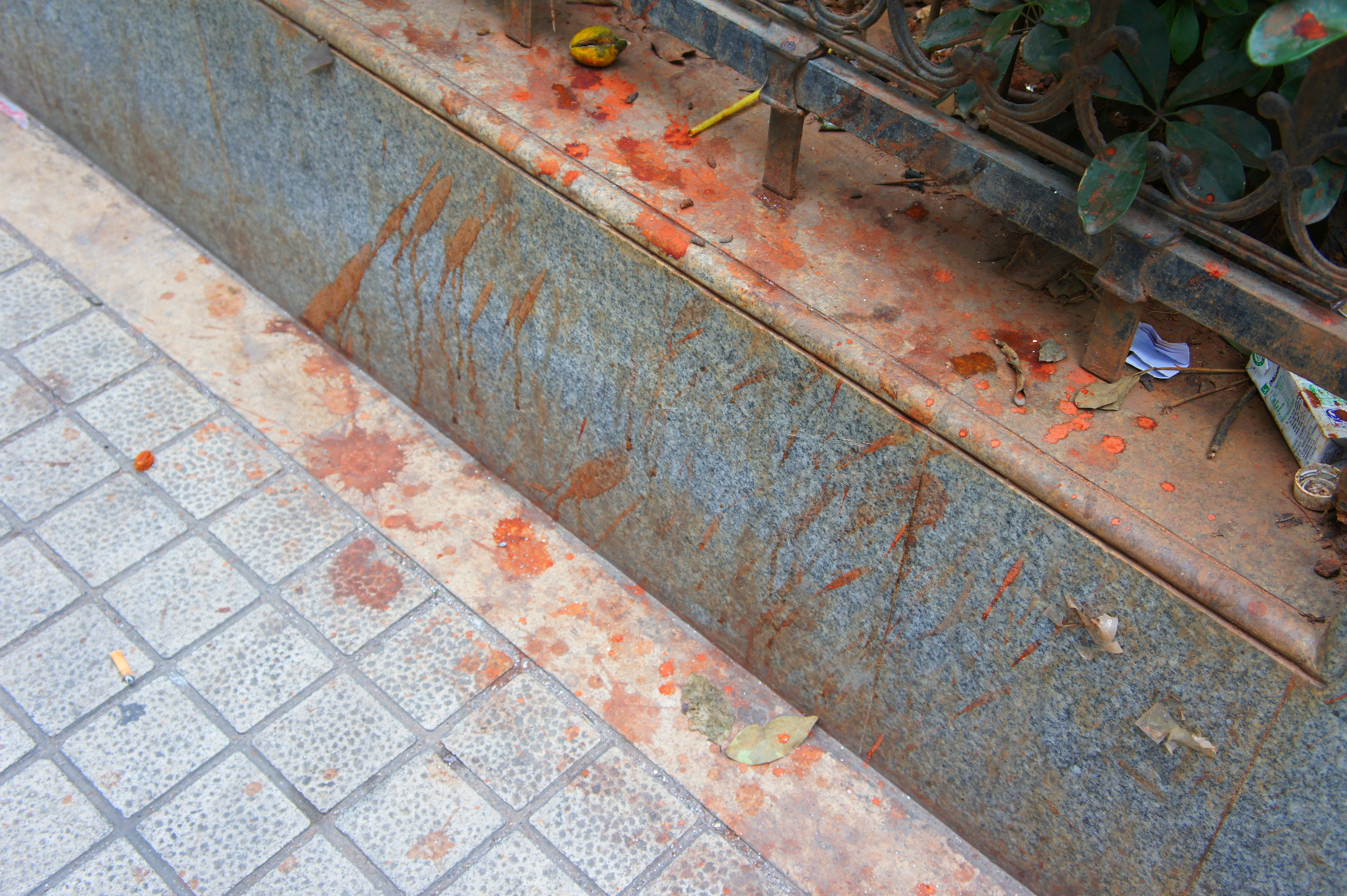
Spit from a chewing betel nut in Hainan

Betel nut is an addictive stimulant. The International Agency for Research, a group sponsored by the World Health Organization, has listed areca nuts and betel leaves as carcinogens causing agents. It said that long-term use can cause dental ulcers, gum degeneration and cancers of the mouth and esophagus. The Kinmen coast guard intercepted 12,000 kg of betel nut being smuggled to Kinmen from China in mid-June 2004. In 2021, The Consulate-General of the People's Republic of China in Istanbul, Turkey, announced that several Chinese travelers entering Turkey with betel nuts had been arrested, for the nut is illegal in Turkey.

The city of Xiamen in Fujian banned the production, sales and consumption of the nuts in 1996. In 2013, a series of special reports, collectively titled The Disfigured Face of the Betel Nut Industry, drew the public's attention toward the link between betel nuts and oral cancer. The former national food and drug administration listed betel nut as a top carcinogen in 2017. According to a 2019 report in The Lancet, a peer-reviewed medical journal, a study that looked back at 8,222 people with oral cancer in Hunan province found that 90 per cent of these patients chewed areca nuts. The report called on the Chinese government to use advertising restrictions as a step towards a “wider ban on the nut in the future”. In the year, Ding Xiaobing, a deputy to the National People's Congress, proposed cancer warnings on packages of betel nut products. Betel nuts were removed from the updated version of the food production permit catalog released by the State Administration for Market Regulation in 2020, and an advertising ban issued by the National Radio and Television Administration in 2021 that forbids all related advertisements on radio, television or online. In 2022, Chinese singer Fu Song who used to claim on social media that cancer was caused by chewing betel nuts and asked the public to keep away from it, died from oral cancer by his habit of chewing betel nuts. His death rekindled discussions about tightening controls on sales of the nuts. Thus, local market regulators in Zhejiang, Sichuan and Jiangxi provinces rolled out notices to ban all sales of betel nuts as a food product.

== See also ==
- Smoking in China
- Health in China
