= Smoking in Hong Kong =

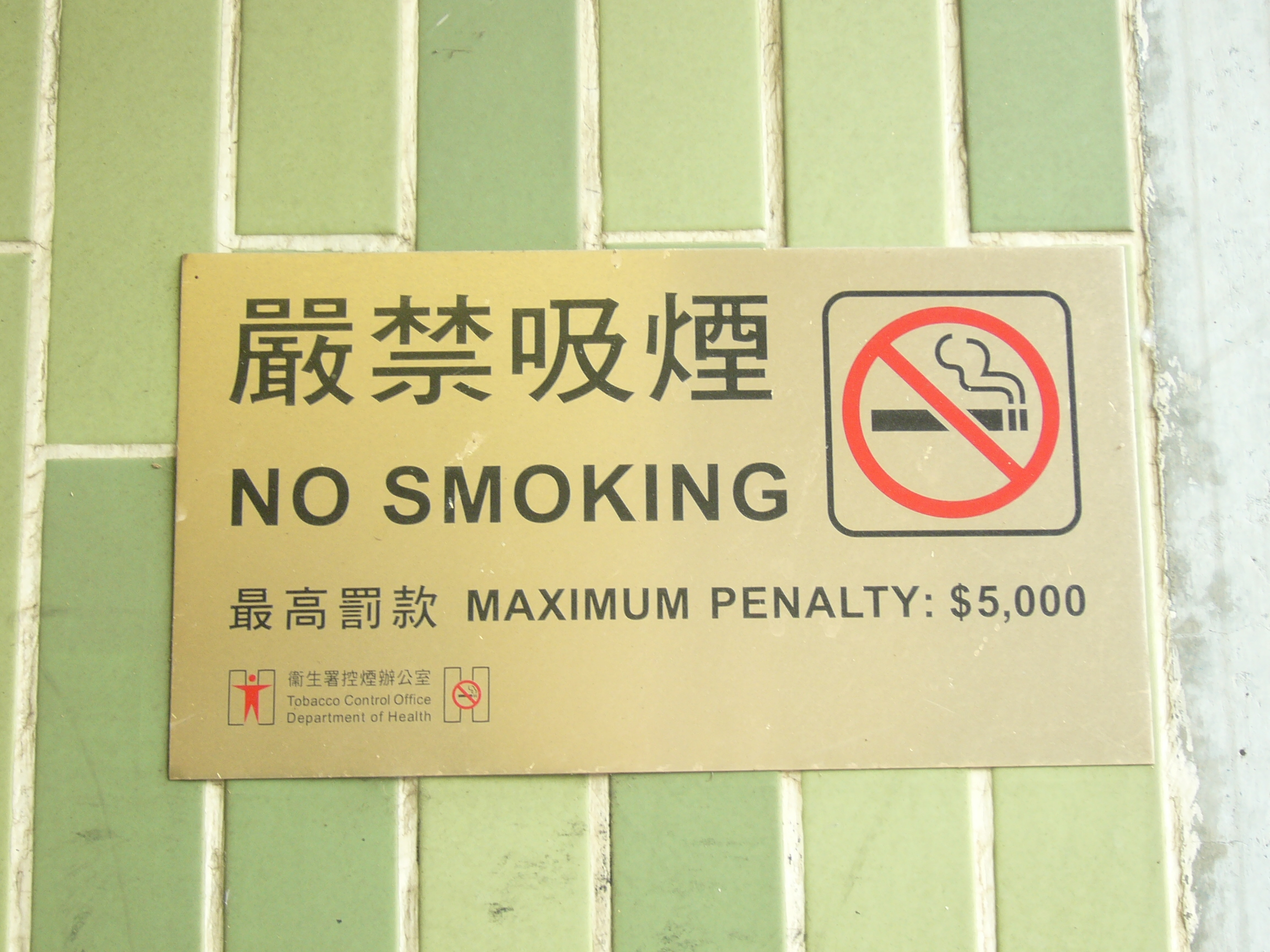
No smoking sign in Hong Kong

Tobacco smoking in Hong Kong has declined in recent decades, with only 8.5% of Hong Kongers smoking on a daily basis as of 2025. It is the policy of the Hong Kong government to discourage smoking. Smoking is banned in most public places and tobacco advertising is prohibited. Active smoking accounted for 26.3% of deaths in people aged 35 or over. Annual tobacco-related diseases reached US$1.27 billion (0.3% of 2021 Hong Kong GDP) in 2021.

== Prevalence ==
The overall daily smoking rate in Hong Kong was 8.5% in 2025. This has declined from 23.3% in the early 1980s. Hong Kong has the world's longest lifespan, and experts have attributed this to the low smoking rate.

In 2015 there were 641,300 daily smokers (of which 538,300 or 83.9% were male and 103,000 or 16.1% female). Approximately 19% of Hong Kong males smoke whereas in China 53% of males smoke.

== Policy and legislation ==
It is the policy of the Hong Kong government to discourage smoking and to reduce the impact of second-hand smoke on the general public. The Department of Health is generally responsible for enforcing government policies regarding smoking.

Smoking in public has been banned from 1 January 2007 under the government's revised Smoking (Public Health) Ordinance (Cap. 371), first enacted in 1982 with several amendments subsequently. The latest amendment enlarges the smoking ban to include indoor workplaces, most public places including restaurants, Internet cafés, public lavatories, beaches and most public parks. Some bars, karaoke parlors, saunas and nightclubs were exempt until 1 July 2009. Smoking bans in lifts, public transport, cinemas, concert halls, airport terminal and escalators had been phased in between 1982 and 1997. The ban in shopping centres, department stores, supermarkets, banks, game arcades has been in place since July 1998.

An anomaly to the smoking ban are on cross-border trains between Hong Kong and mainland China as they are operated jointly between MTR Corporation and China Railway, of whom the latter allows smoking in the restaurant car and in the vestibules at the end of the cars, but not in the seating area.

Any person who smokes or carries a lit tobacco product in a statutory no smoking area commits an offence and is liable on summary conviction to a maximum fine of HK$5,000. Unlike many other jurisdictions, Hong Kong does not place the onus on licensees of liquor licensed premises to enforce smoking bans with subsequent loss of licence for non compliance. A new law, to enter into force in September 2009, provides for fixed-penalty arrangement (HK$1,500) for smoking, on a par with that for littering. At the same time smoking will be banned in designated public transport interchanges, but the Government has yet to clarify how it will enforce this against non Hong Kong ID card holders and tourists, since the offender has 21 days after the ticket issue to pay up.

== E-cigarettes ==
In light of use of e-cigarettes among primary and secondary school students, the government is considering prohibiting the import and sale of e-cigarettes. It says there are health concerns associated with e-cigarettes, and that the devices may make smoking mainstream again, particularly among Hong Kong youth.

== Plain packaging ==
A tobacco advertisement formed from the lids of cigarette packs in a convenience store in Hong Kong

Standardised plain packaging will come into effect in Hong Kong starting March 2027. Tobacco packages must feature a prescribed drab colour, with brand and variant names printed in a designated colour and font. Furthermore, only permitted marks may be printed on packs, and no logos or graphics will be permitted other than official health warning images. Previously, tobacco companies utilised a legal loophole to place advertisements on packaging lids for display in stores. This practice will be eliminated under the new plain packaging law.

== Other policies ==
Cathay Pacific, Hong Kong's flag carrier, became the first Asian airline to introduce non-smoking flights in June 1990. By 1993, 60% of the company's flights were non-smoking.

Smoking (or carrying a lighted cigarette) is banned in common areas of public housing estates of the Housing Authority. Smoking offenders are liable to receive five points under the housing provider's Marking Scheme, a demerit point system used to enforce housing estate rules.

== See also ==
- Love in a Puff, a 2010 Hong Kong romantic comedy directed by Pang Ho-cheung
