= Secretary for Security =

Position of the Hong Kong Government

Hong Kong Special Administrative Region Secretary for Security
- 保安局局長
- Emblem of Hong Kong

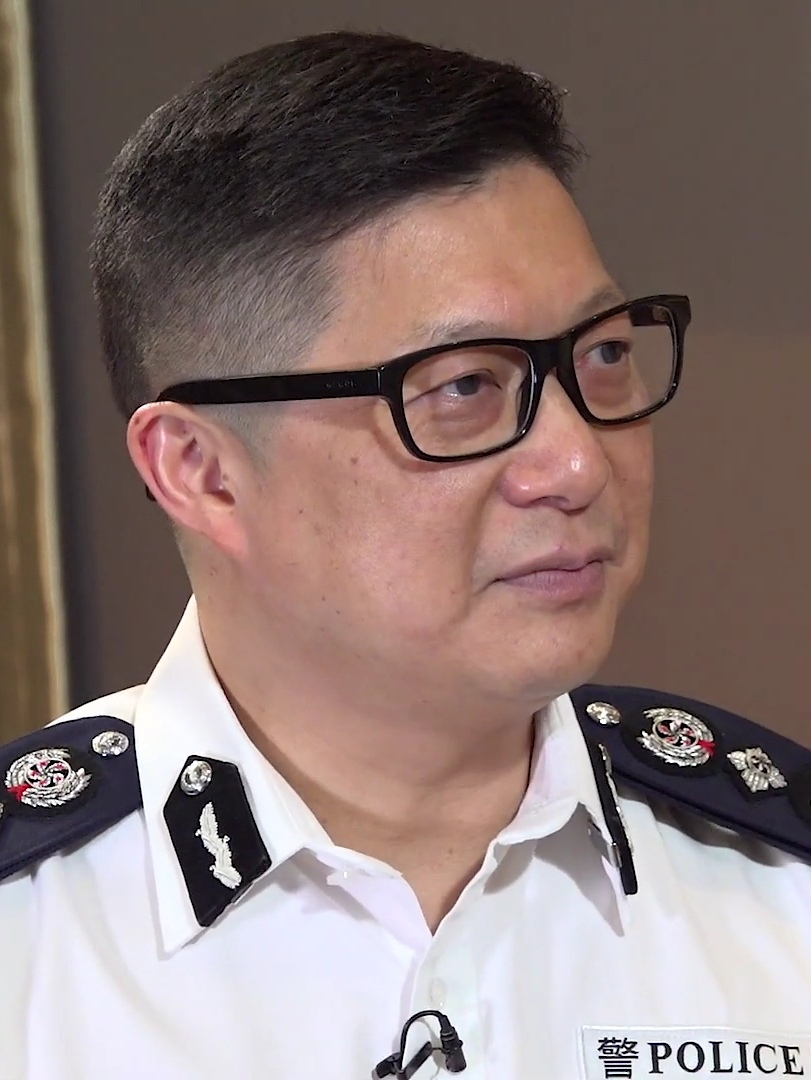
- Incumbent; Chris Tang since 25 June 2021
- Security Bureau
- Style: The Honourable
- Appointer: Central People's Government (via nomination by the Chief Executive)
- Inaugural holder: Peter Lai
- Formation: 1 July 2007
- Salary: HK$4,021,200
- Website: Security Bureau

Secretary for Security
- Traditional Chinese: 保安局局長
- Simplified Chinese: 保安局局长
Transcriptions
Standard Mandarin
- Hanyu Pinyin: Bǎo'ānjújúzhǎng
Yue: Cantonese
- Yale Romanization: Bóu ōn guhk guhk jéung
- Jyutping: Bou2 on1 guk6 guk6 zoeng2

The Secretary for Security is the member of the Government of Hong Kong in charge of the Security Bureau, which is responsible for public safety, security, and immigration matters.

The post was created in 1973 and since the Principal Officials Accountability System was adopted in 2002, the Secretary for Security has been a member of the Executive Council. Before 1973, the office was known as the Secretary for Defence.

Areas of responsibility include:

- Police Force
- Correctional Services
- Immigration Department
- Customs and Excise Department
- Fire Services Department
- Government Flying Service
- Maritime Rescue Co-ordination Centre

== List of office holders ==
Political party: Nonpartisan

=== Defence Secretary, 1941 ===
No.	Portrait	Name	Term of office		Governor	Ref
1		John Alexander Fraser 傅瑞憲	April 1941	25 December 1941	Mark Aitchison Young (1941)	

=== Defence Secretaries, 1957–1969 ===
No.	Portrait	Name	Term of office		Governor	Ref
1		Alastair Todd 陶雅禮	1957	19 October 1960	Sir Alexander Grantham (1947–1957)	
1		Alastair Todd 陶雅禮	1957	19 October 1960	Sir Robert Brown Black (1958–1964)	
2		Kenneth Strathmore Kinghorn 景韓	20 October 1960	22 November 1960	Sir Robert Brown Black (1958–1964)	
3		Donald Luddington 陸鼎堂	23 November 1960	17 December 1961	Sir Robert Brown Black (1958–1964)	
4		David Harold Jordan 左敦	18 December 1961	27 November 1966	Sir Robert Brown Black (1958–1964)	
4		David Harold Jordan 左敦	18 December 1961	27 November 1966	Sir David Trench (1964–1971)	
5		Peter Barry Williams 衛理欽	28 November 1966	8 February 1967	Sir David Trench (1964–1971)	
6		Jack Cater 姬達	9 February 1967	21 May 1967	Sir David Trench (1964–1971)	
7		Peter Barry Williams 衛理欽	22 May 1967	31 March 1968	Sir David Trench (1964–1971)	
8		Alastair Todd 陶雅禮	1 April 1968	9 August 1968	Sir David Trench (1964–1971)	
9		Ian Macdonald Lightbody 黎保德	10 August 1968	19 February 1969	Sir David Trench (1964–1971)	
10		Alastair Todd 陶雅禮	20 February 1969	1971	Sir David Trench (1964–1971)	

=== Secretaries for Security, 1973–1997 ===
No.	Portrait	Name	Term of office		Governor	Ref
1		George Peter Lloyd 羅以德	June 1973	March 1974	Sir Murray MacLehose (1971–1982)	
2		Lewis Mervyn Davis 戴宏志	March 1974	October 1982	Sir Murray MacLehose (1971–1982)	
2		Lewis Mervyn Davis 戴宏志	March 1974	October 1982	Sir Edward Youde (1982–1986)	
3		David Jeaffreson 謝法新	November 1982	February 1988	Sir Edward Youde (1982–1986)	
3		David Jeaffreson 謝法新	November 1982	February 1988	Sir David Wilson (1986–1992)	
4		Geoffrey Barnes 班乃信	February 1988	February 1990	Sir David Wilson (1986–1992)	
5		Alistair Asprey 區士培	February 1990	February 1995	Sir David Wilson (1986–1992)	
5		Alistair Asprey 區士培	February 1990	February 1995	Chris Patten (1992–1997)	
6		Peter Lai 黎慶寧	February 1995	30 June 1997	Chris Patten (1992–1997)	

=== Secretaries for Security, 1997–present ===
No.	Portrait	Name	Term of office		Duration	Chief Executive	Term	Ref
1		Peter Lai Hing-ling 黎慶寧	1 July 1997	30 August 1998	1 year, 60 days	Tung Chee-hwa (1997–2002)	1	
2		Regina Ip Lau Suk-yee 葉劉淑儀	31 August 1998	3 August 2003	4 years, 337 days	Tung Chee-hwa (1997–2002)	1	
2		Regina Ip Lau Suk-yee 葉劉淑儀	31 August 1998	3 August 2003	4 years, 337 days	Tung Chee-hwa (1997–2002)	2	
3		Ambrose Lee Siu-kwong 李少光	4 August 2003	30 June 2012	8 years, 331 days	Tung Chee-hwa (1997–2002)	2	
3		Ambrose Lee Siu-kwong 李少光	4 August 2003	30 June 2012	8 years, 331 days	Donald Tsang (2005–2012)	2	
3		Ambrose Lee Siu-kwong 李少光	4 August 2003	30 June 2012	8 years, 331 days	Donald Tsang (2005–2012)	3	
4		Lai Tung-kwok 黎棟國	1 July 2012	30 June 2017	5 years, 0 days	Leung Chun-ying (2012–2017)	4	
5		John Lee Ka-chiu 李家超	1 July 2017	24 June 2021	3 years, 359 days	Carrie Lam (2017–2022)	5	
6		Chris Tang Ping-keung 鄧炳強	25 June 2021	Incumbent	5 years, 74 days	Carrie Lam (2017–2022)	5	
6		Chris Tang Ping-keung 鄧炳強	25 June 2021	Incumbent	5 years, 74 days	John Lee (2022–present)	6	
