= Yang Tingzhong =

Chinese social and behavioral science scholar

Yang Tingzhong (Chinese: 杨廷忠) is a scholar in social and behavioural sciences, a population behaviorist, and sociologist in health.

== Biography ==
Yang moved to Guyuan when he was a child, a village in the Ningxia Muslim Hui Autonomous Region, an area which blends Muslim culture with that of the Han Chinese. This background, combined with traumatic experiences in the Great Famine during Maozedong's Cultural Revolution, made him cognizant of distinctive patterns of health behaviors under this culture norms. In turn, this laid the foundation for the main focus of his career, tobacco control. Smoking in the People's Republic of China represents an enormous public health problem. Many Chinese universities are developing training programs for medical students to improve capacity for tobacco control advocacy. Since 2007, Yang has been directing the first program aiming at promoting all forms of tobacco control in Chinese universities. Projects comprising this program are sponsored by the Bloomberg Initiative to Reduce Tobacco Use. The first goal of the project is to conduct tobacco control advocacy capacity training among medical students and the second goal is ban smoking on university campuses nationwide. Currently, the project currently covers all provinces, municipalities, and autonomous regions in China which involves 102 universities from more than 71 cities. A total of about 280,000 medical students capable of tobacco control advocacy had been trained through this project. All participating universities have adopted smoking-free campus policies, with a third of them expected to achieve the goals set by the project. The outcomes of this research project have been reported by the WHO, selected in the university's Research Highlights at the 120th anniversary of Zhejiang University, and was introduced under the title of "Using Cultural Understanding to Stub out Killer Habit" in Nature. Yang is a leader in this initiative, and produces numerous publications in major journals with many international collaborators. Several papers were cited by WHO report on the global tobacco epidemic, and other official documents. Core information of "Global Health Professions Student Survey (GHPSS) in Tobacco Control in China "was released by the United Nations. Yang's research on tobacco control has been selected one of the Research Highlights of the University at the celebration of the 120th anniversary of Zhejiang University.

Yang's research focuses on social and behavior theory in public health science, implementing the development of China's social and cultural models and best practices. He proposed several theories, such as the Theory of Effective and Reasoned Action, Perceived Belief-Subjective Norm Theory, the Cross-level Theory between Individual Behavior Cognition and Social Influence, Social Structure Behavior Theory and It's Cross -level Models and Chinese concept (Changdao Cudong) and culture modes of advocacy theory. He has published several books, including "Health Behavior Theory and Research" and "Health Research: Social and Behavioral Theory and Methods." He has also edited books such as "Smoking Environments in China, Challenges for Tobacco Control" and "Mental Stress and Behaviour Problems Among Special Groups: Social Resources, Influences on Health, and Reducing Health Inequities."

In addition, Yang has also studied mental stress, exploring the social mechanisms of mental stress among Chinese people. He proposed a social theory for stress and the concept of situational uncertainty stress, and developed the Chinese Perceived Stress Scale (CPSS) and the uncertainty stress questionnaire, and has also created a cultural stress management model, which has been widely used in China, particularly in the study of COVID-19 Yang graduated from Shanxi Medicine University (Public Health) in 1982. He was appraised as an outstanding contributing scientist by the government of Jiangsu Province in 1994. Yang served as Assistant Research Scientist at the University of California, San Diego from 1998 to 2000. He is a full professor in the Department of Social Medicine at Zhejiang University.

== Position ==
Yang is currently the Director and full professor of Zhejiang University's Research Center for Tobacco Control and Department of Social Medicine at Zhejiang University. He was a past advisor for the World Health Organization (WHO) in delivering policy and program on tobacco control to health professions students, and served as an expert in updating management of CRDs in the WHO Global Action Plan 2013–2020. He is also a member, the expert committee of the National Association on Tobacco Control, review committee for science and technology awards of Chinese Preventive Medicine Association, and an external faculty affiliate at the West Virginia University's Injury Control Research Center in the United States. Yang was invited to serve as academician of Russian Academy of Social and Fundamental Sciences named after M.V. Lomonosov(77-DVM,024010049).in THE RUSSIAN ACADEMY OF FUNDAMENTAL AND SOCIAL SCIENCES NAMED AFTER ACADEMICIAN M.V. LOMONOSOV .

He was the Asian Editor for the American Journal of Health behavior, and Currently is editor of the Global Journal of Social Sciences Studies, and Pollution and Public Health.

His primary academic domain is social and behavioural science in public health.

== Available Papers and Books ==
- scientificcommons.org - Resources and Information.
- Yang, T; Li, F; Yang, X; Wu, Z; Feng, X; Wang, Y; Wang, X; Abdullah, A. S. (2008). "Smoking patterns and sociodemographic factors associated with tobacco use among Chinese rural male residents: A descriptive analysis". BMC Public Health. 8 248. doi:10.1186/1471-2458-8-248. PMC 2492861. PMID 18644139.
- Ai zi bing wei xian xing wei kuo san de she hui xue yan jiu
