= Smoking in China =

Smoking in China is prevalent, as the People's Republic of China is the world's largest consumer and producer of tobacco. As of 2022, there are around 300 million Chinese smokers, and 2.4 trillion cigarettes are sold there every year, 46% of the world total.

The China National Tobacco Corporation is by sales the largest single manufacturer of tobacco products in the world and boasts a monopoly in mainland China, generating nearly $213 billion revenue in 2022. Within the Chinese guanxi system, tobacco is still a ubiquitous gift acceptable on any occasion, particularly outside urban areas. Tobacco control exists as smoking bans, but public enforcement is rare outside the largest cities, such as Shanghai and Beijing. Furthermore, outside the largest cities in China, smoking is considered socially acceptable anywhere at any time, even if it is technically illegal. Smoking is a social custom in the PRC, and giving cigarettes at any social interaction is a sign of respect and friendliness.

The Chinese Association on Tobacco Control (中国控制吸烟协会; Zhōngguó kòngzhì xīyān xiéhuì) is engaged in tobacco control by members of the voluntary sector, including academic, social and mass organizations, as strong enforcement of existing tobacco control laws is not supported by the Chinese Government.

== Tobacco control legislation ==
The universal no-smoking symbol is frequently ignored in mainland China

On May 20, 2009, the Ministry of Health of China issued a formal decision to completely ban smoking in all health administration offices and medical facilities by the year 2011. The enactment of the May 20 initiative represented an important landmark in China's commitment to tobacco control. However, due to the Chinese government's complex relationship with tobacco policy (for instance, many localities rely upon tobacco tax revenue as a substantial source of income), there have been many concerns about the practicality of the national policy's enforcement.

In addition to the May 20 measure, numerous provincial and city-level administrations in China have also enacted policies to control the prevalence and health impacts of smoking within the last decade.

=== Impact of the WHO Framework Convention on Tobacco Control ===
On October 11, 2005, China became the 78th country in the world to ratify the WHO Framework Convention on Tobacco Control (FCTC), an international treaty intended to reduce tobacco-related disease and death. Under the conditions of the FCTC, China is required to completely ban "promotion and sponsorship on radio, television, print media and the Internet within five years," as well as to prohibit tobacco companies from sponsoring international events or activities. China has also resolved to ban all tobacco vending machines, as well as smoking in indoor work places, public areas, and public transportation vehicles.

Despite China's own widespread and complex smoking issue, the ratification of the FCTC in China represents a significant commitment to tobacco control in international public health policy. According to Dr. Shigeru Omi, the WHO Regional Director for the Western Pacific region, "implementing the Convention will not be easy, as smoking is an ingrained habit in China ... but the Government has made clear its commitment to take action." In light of the FCTC, concerns about international image, and strong support from both citizens and domestic health authorities, the Chinese government has become increasingly involved in tobacco prevention and tobacco-related health promotion programs.

=== Ministry of Health Report ===
The Ministry of Health had already maintained active involvement in decrying the negative effects of smoking and striving toward decreased prevalence of tobacco use. On May 29, 2007, the Ministry released a report (2007 年中国控制吸烟报告—The 2007 China Smoking Control Report) detailing alarming levels of secondhand smoke exposure (affecting over 540 million Chinese citizens), recommendations for legislation to reduce harm from secondhand smoke, and the feasibility of implementing public smoking bans based upon polling data. Notably, the report agreed with international scientific consensus about secondhand smoke, citing numerous findings from public health authorities in other countries to assert the conclusion that "there is no safe level of exposure to second-hand smoke", that ventilation equipment is ineffective in reducing the harm from exposure to second-hand smoke, and that the most effective protective public health measure against smoking is a legislative ban of smoking in public places. With an explicitly stated objective of "building smoke-free environments for the sake of enjoying healthy life", the report has received strong support and praise from the Campaign for Tobacco-Free Kids, a U.S. health advocacy group based in Washington, D.C.

In addition, the report suggested a strong likelihood of success for the implementation of complete public smoking bans in seven major urban areas on the basis of demonstrated widespread popular support for such measures. According to an analysis by the Campaign for Tobacco-Free Kids, polling data in the Ministry of Health report revealed:

"Overwhelming public support for the enactment of totally smoke-free public spaces ... support for total smoking bans exceeds support for partial smoking bans ... Among smokers, the polls found that 93.5% support a total ban on smoking in all schools, 75.5% support a total ban in hospitals, and 94.3% support a total ban in all public transport. Among non-smokers, 95.1% support a total ban in all schools, 78.1% support a total ban in hospitals and over 93.8% support a ban in public transport. Some 70.6% of non-smokers support some type of smoking ban in bars and restaurants.

=== Nationwide ban ===
Although China still lags behind many countries in implementing tobacco control policy, the Ministry of Health's May 20 initiative helped to establish more unified smoking controls and codify public health authority at broad administrative levels. From 2009, Projects sponsored by Bloomberg Initiative and directed by Yang Tingzhong were designed as the first program to prohibit all forms of smoking in University campuses in China. The Ministry's "Decision" formally requests local governmental units to "set up multi-agency FCTC Implementation Leading Small Groups" to assist with regional strategies of enforcement, with the explicit goal that:

"by the year 2010, all health administration offices, both military and non-military, and at least 50% of all medical and health institutions should become smoke-free units, so that the goal of a total smoking ban in all health administration offices and medical and health institutions can be fulfilled by 2011."

The "Decision" also encourages health administration offices to utilize mass media resources and draw upon large-scale publicity campaigns such as World No Tobacco Day in order to "actively promote the importance of implementing a total smoking ban in military and civil health administration offices and medical and health institutions."

==== Popular opinion ====
As polls from the 2007 Ministry of Health report showed, there is widespread public approval of smoking bans among residents of urban areas. Various health experts, activists, and public advocacy groups regard the Chinese government's escalating efforts toward tobacco policy as "surely good news for the country's smoking control progress." Notable support also exists within the sphere of representative politics; allegedly, political advisors of the CPPCC have even gone so far as to call for smoke-free legislative sessions.

However, widespread apathy and tacit acceptance toward smoking policy are likely to predominate within large portions of the Chinese population. China has a relatively low social disapproval rate of smoking—according to the International Tobacco Control Policy Evaluation Project (ITC), "only 59% of smokers think that Chinese society disapproves of smoking, the fourth lowest rate of 14 ITC countries surveyed."

==== Dissent and unresolved issues ====
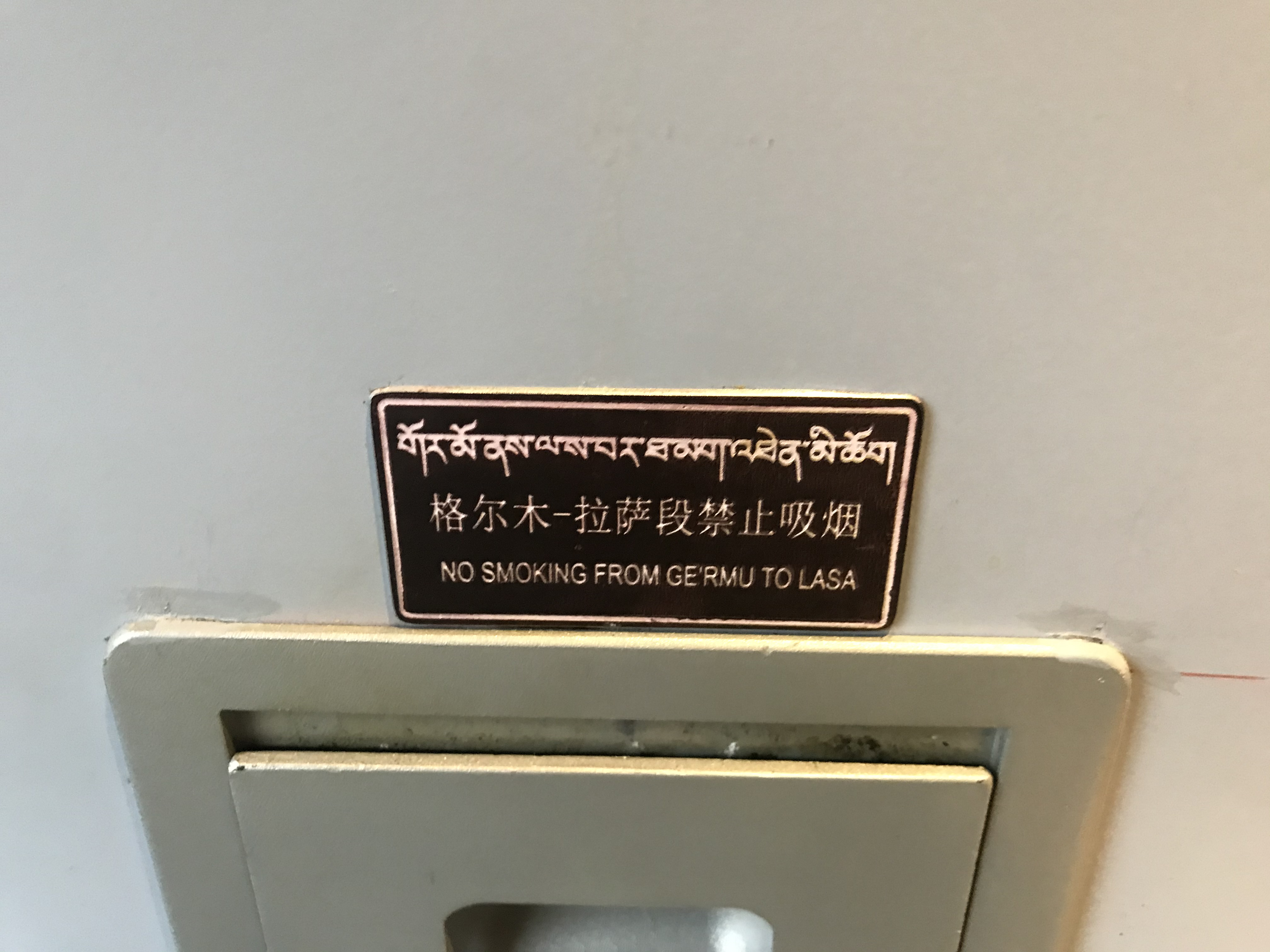
No smoking sign on the Qinghai-Tibet railway written Tibetan, Chinese and English

Given the complex and multifaceted nature of political agendas in China, governmental public-health related interests often clash with economic interests. Because tobacco remains a significant source of both health risks and revenue for municipal and national governing entities, specific Chinese tobacco control policies in different contexts may betray an overall position of ambivalence or inconsistency. For instance, local exemptions to public indoor smoking bans are often made for small businesses, particularly in the restaurant and entertainment industries. Such indeterminate enforcements of supposedly well-defined public health regulations in practice may limit the impact of de jure national smoking bans. In practice, it is often the case that only some government offices, schools, museums, some hospitals, and sports venues effectively function as smoke-free areas. In addition, the cultural basis of smoking in China presents a significant barrier to de facto acceptance and integration of smoking control policies. According to Li Xinhua, an expert on tobacco-control publicity and education in the Ministry of Health, “about 60 percent of medical workers and professors are smokers [and thus in violation of the law calling for a complete public smoking ban] ... Some of them even smoke boldly in hospitals or schools.” This is problematic because, regardless of whether these professionals continue to smoke out of habit, social custom, or "apparent disregard" for evidence of smoking risk, they are still expected to "behave themselves and set a good example for others in tobacco control," Li says.

Also, enforcement of national tobacco-control policies is still largely sparse in rural areas, where the state-owned China National Tobacco Corporation exerts much of its influence in tobacco production and marketing. As a response to FCTC recommendations for reduction of access and supply-side tobacco regulation, the Ministry of Health is now targeting farmers to give up tobacco plantation and trying to “convince them that the tobacco industry can be replaced by other industries that are more healthy, sustainable and profitable.”

Another potential obstacle is the Chinese tobacco industry's lack of complete compliance with nationally defined policies regarding the correct presentation of warning labels on cigarette packages, which must be readily visible and cover at least 30% of the visible area of the packaging. Wu Yiqun, vice executive director with the Beijing-based Thinktank Research Center for Health Development, criticized China's tobacco industry supervisory administration for "[failing] to oversee Chinese tobacco producers" in this aspect.

Furthermore, the International Tobacco Control Policy Evaluation Project brings up the following persistent smoking issues in its 2009 report focused on China:

- In addition to "strong social pressure placed upon Chinese men to smoke", it is also expected that female smoking will become "more socially acceptable as the tobacco industry increasingly targets female smokers."

Current tobacco control legislation in China does not explicitly address gendered or social bases for smoking.

- Smoking cessation is "relatively uncommon in China, and most smokers quit cigarette smoking because of chronic illness." Indeed, "awareness of the health risks of smoking is low in China. Only 68% of smokers believe that smoking causes lung cancer in smokers (compared to well over 90% in Western countries) and 54% believe that smoking causes lung cancer in non-smokers. Only 37% of smokers are aware that smoking causes coronary heart disease and only 17% are aware that smoking causes strokes."

In order to maintain a robust, sustainable effort in tobacco control, China will particularly need to focus upon the role of public health education in smoking prevention and health promotion.

- "Taxation is a very effective method of reducing tobacco use. However, very few smokers (5%) in the ITC China Survey reported thinking about price as a reason to quit smoking—a sign that prices are too low."

Current tax regulations in Chinese tobacco control policy are limited, inconsistent, and tied to the structural intricacies of domestic ownership and control of tobacco production and distribution.

=== Restriction in electronic media ===
On February 12, 2011, State Administration of Radio, Film and Television, announced that it will ban inappropriate smoking scenes in movies and TV shows. The announcement said smoking scenes are out of line with the country's stance on tobacco control, and are misleading to the public, especially minors. Thus it is prohibiting scenes of cigarette brands, people smoking at smoke-free places, minors buying and smoking cigarettes, and other smoking scenes associated with minors. After the announcement was done, the ban was effective immediately.

=== Regional and citywide initiatives ===
==== Shanghai ====
In light of its preparations to host the 2010 World Expo, the city of Shanghai had recently heightened its anti-smoking legislation. The Shanghai Municipal People's Congress issued the city's first smoking control law in March 2010. The law bans smoking in 12 types of public places including indoor smoking at schools, hospitals, sport stadiums, public transport vehicles and Internet cafes. Anyone caught smoking would first be given a warning and then face a fine of 50 to 200 yuan if they resist. According to Li Zhongyang, the deputy head of the Shanghai Health Promotion Committee, the smoking ban was enacted to protect citizens' health and also promote Shanghai's image as a cosmopolitan city.

According to a report by the Fudan University Media and Public Opinion Research Center, 93.5% of the 509 people they interviewed supported a smoking ban at all Shanghai Expo 2010 pavilions and also felt that smoking should not be allowed in restaurants or shopping centers near the Expo area. Another survey done by public health experts from Fudan University which involved 800 hotel guests and around 4,000 patrons and employees of restaurants, shops and entertainment venues in Shanghai found that about 73 percent of the hotel guests said Shanghai should adopt a smoking ban in public areas, 84 percent of restaurant guests reported exposure to second-hand smoke, and 74 percent of them were annoyed by the fumes and support smoking controls. While many interviewers found second-hand smoke itself toxic and damaging to citizen's health, a main reason behind popular support for the smoking ban relates to the citizen's concern for Shanghai's image. According to one citizen that the public health experts from Fudan interviewed, "Smoking has been banned in public places in several countries. We should do the same, at least during the Expo, since it is a cosmopolitan event. And of course, for the sake of the public who would be visiting." For organizers of the Expo, there was also the issue of hypocrisy if they did not deal with China's smoking problem as part of their "Healthy Expo."

Despite the popular support for the Shanghai smoking ban, many also feel skeptical about the actual implementation of the law. Shanghai residents point out that despite the fact many shopping malls and all subways and subway stations actually already banned smoking prior to this law, there is low compliance and people often smoke directly in front of NO SMOKING signs. One most basic concern Shanghai residents have regarding the ban is the lack of clarity regarding who will do the fining and who will report the offenses. Public health experts agree that it will be difficult to enforce a strict ban with the large number of smokers present in Shanghai.

In addition to passing the smoking ban, Shanghai legislators have designed a website "Smoke Free Shanghai" to raise anti-smoking awareness. Also, the most concrete measure that has been taken is that Expo organizers refused a 200 million yuan ($29.3 million) donation from the Shanghai Tobacco Company last year to maintain their "healthy Expo" stance.

==== Beijing ====
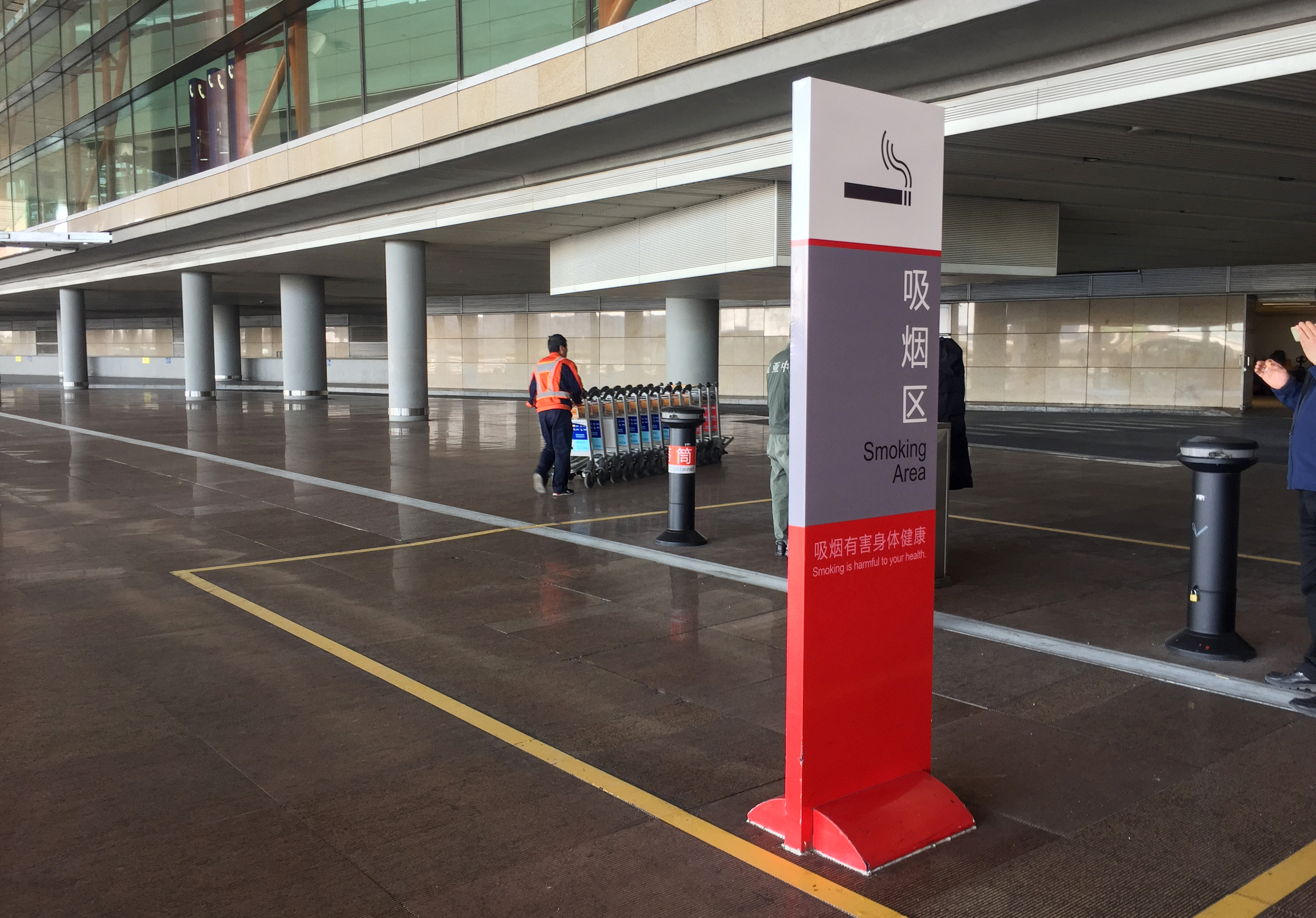
Designated smoking area outside Beijing Capital International Airport

In light of the passage of national tobacco initiatives and international publicity for the 2008 Summer Olympics, the Beijing city government extended a public smoking ban on May 1, 2008 to include sports venues and all indoor areas of government offices, transport stations, schools and hospitals. The ban had a generally strong impact, with poll results suggesting that a majority of Chinese residents (69% out of over 10000 respondents) are "not only aware of a smoking ban in Beijing, but [95% of respondents] also hope that the authorities promote the move nationwide."

According to China Daily News:

"The survey also showed that 81.6 percent of respondents were eager to stop smoking, or had heard of family members and friends who were considering kicking the habit. 'I am delighted by such encouraging support from the public, it will help to promote legislation to control tobacco use,' [said] Jiang Yuan, vice-head of the tobacco control office under the Chinese Center for Disease Control and Prevention."

The Beijing government has also adopted a policy of persuasion, combined with a fine of up to 5,000 yuan ($730) for violating the ban, in an attempt to further encourage citizens to curtail public smoking.

A direct positive public health impact of the Beijing smoking ban has manifested in the arena of fire prevention. According to People's Daily,

"The smoking ban has cut the number of fires in the city sparked by cigarette butts by more than half ... In the first week of this month, the Beijing fire brigade put out eight cigarette-related fires, an average of 1.14 per day ... The new daily average [after the extended smoking ban] was less than half of what was reported in the first four months of this year, when the city's firefighters had to put out 325 fires caused by cigarette butts, or 2.7 per day."

==== Guangdong Province ====
In 2007, Guangzhou and Jiangmen became Guangdong's first two cities for experimental enforcement of total smoking ban at some public places. The public places for smoking ban included restaurants, entertainment outlets, schools, supermarkets, and governmental offices. However, by March 2010, the Guangzhou Municipal People's Congress prepared to lift the smoking ban in work places, including offices, conference rooms and auditoriums.

==== Hubei Province ====
In 2009, the authorities of Gongan County attempted to increase consumption of locally produced cigarettes, by demanding that local officials smoke up to 23,000 packs of Hubei-branded cigarettes per year. This measure was intended to bring much-needed revenue to local enterprise; quotas were issued by county authorities to offices under its jurisdiction, which in turn were fined if they failed to consume the demanded quota of cigarettes, or if they were found purchasing other brands of tobacco products. This decision was reversed after public outcry and coverage by international press.

==== Other cities ====
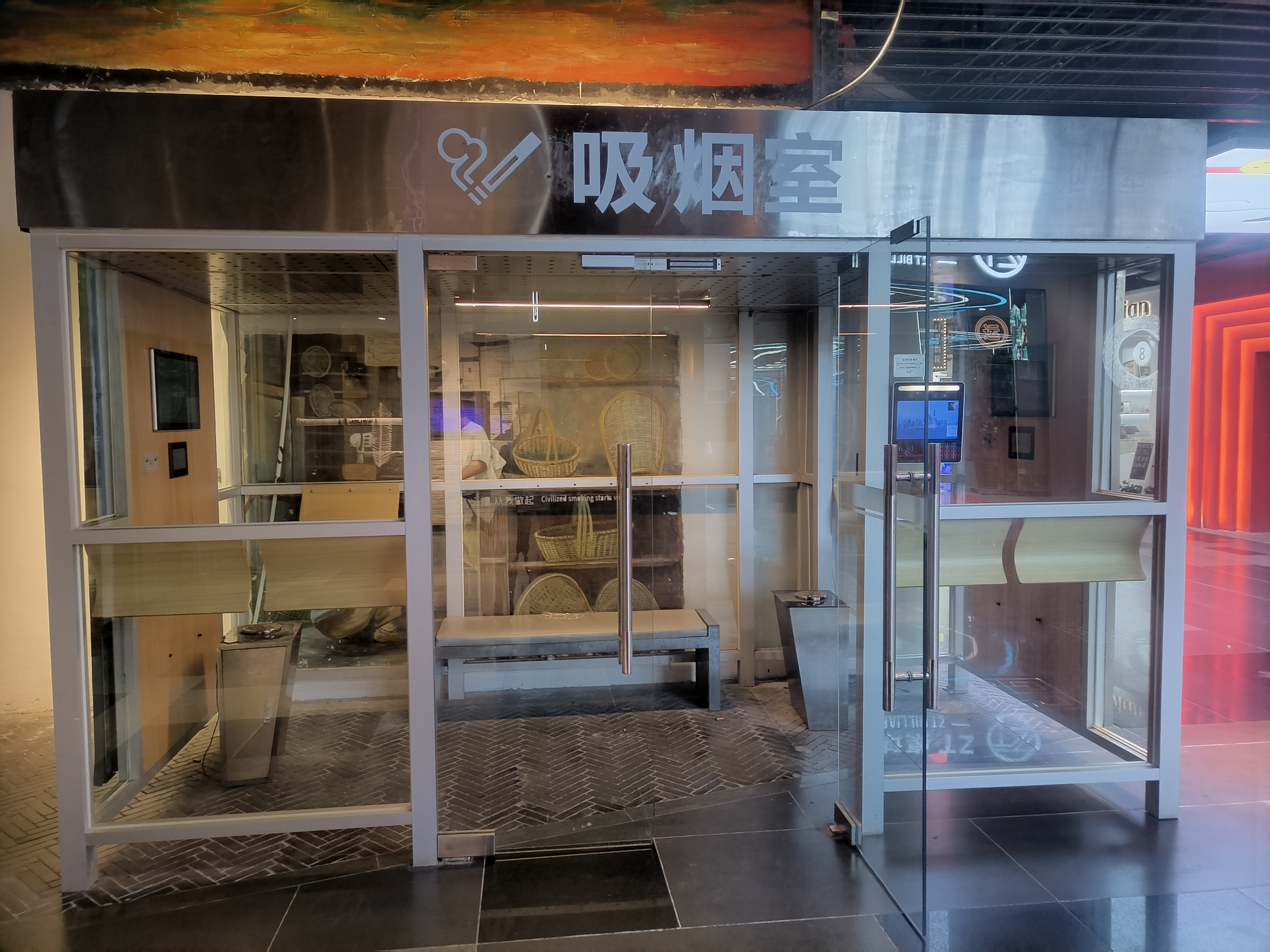
Smoking room in Changzhou

Hangzhou's people's congress had approved to ban smoking in public and working places in the beginning of 2010; smoking may be prohibited in some places and violators may be fined up to 3000 yuan. Yang Tingzhong from Zhejiang University undertook campaigns and project sponsored by Bloomberg Global Initiative to ban smoking in university campuses at a nationwide scale.

According to Medical News Today, seven provincial capitals in China are taking steps to ban smoking in workplaces and public places. The seven cities are Tianjin, Chongqing, Shenyang, Harbin, Nanchang, Lanzhou and Shenzhen. Although there are already some smoking bans in places in these cities, government officials have realized that compliance rate is low and plans to issue a strict ban.

The new ban will be run as a pilot project under the joint auspices of the Chinese Center for Disease Control and Prevention (CDC) and the International Union against Tuberculosis and Lung Disease(UNION). Responding to criticism about the current legislation not being well enforced, Wang Yu, director of the China CDC explained that "This project would create strict legislation to guarantee 100-percent smoke-free public venues and workplaces and figure out a feasible and forceful working mechanism to enforce the smoking ban."

== Smoking among physicians ==
A 2004 study conducted among 3,500 Chinese physicians found that 23% were regular smokers. There was a significant gender difference, with 41% of male physicians reporting to be smokers but only 1% of female physicians. More than one third of current smokers had smoked in front of their patients and nearly all had smoked during their work shift.

Male surgeons were found to smoke more than any other specialty. A study conducted among 800 Chinese male surgeons in 2004 found that 45.2% were smokers and 42.5% had smoked in front of their patients.

The smoking rates from these independent studies are lower than those reported by China's state-run newspaper. An article published in 2009 interviewed a source who claimed that 60% of Chinese male doctors were smokers, a percentage higher than any other country's doctors in the world.

As of 2023, nearly more than a third of male Chinese doctors are estimated to be smokers.

=== Comparison to other populations ===
Smoking rates among Chinese male physicians are comparable to the country's general population, although overall physician rates are lower. Chinese physicians have a substantially higher smoking prevalence than doctors in the United States (3.3%) or United Kingdom (6.8%). They have a slightly higher rate than Japanese physicians (20.2%) and Japanese physicians have a smaller gender discrepancy with 27% male and 7% of female doctors smoking.

=== Causes and influences ===
High tobacco use among physicians may be attributed to several factors. In Chinese culture, smoking is connected to masculine identity as a social activity that is practiced among men to promote feelings of acceptance and brotherhood, which explains why more Chinese male doctors smoke than females. Physicians in particular may resort to tobacco as a coping mechanism to deal with the day-to-day stress that is associated with long work hours and difficult patient interactions.

One surgeon in Kunming (Yunnan province) described smoking as a phenomenon that is an integral part of Chinese medical culture and one that improves job performance:

Smoking is such a big part of being a doctor here. The director of our hospital smokes. The party-secretary smokes. The chair of my department smokes. And whenever I walk into the duty office, most of my colleagues are smoking. And to tell you the truth, with such a pressure-filled job, smoking is extremely helpful, at times soothing, at times energizing, at times helping me focus my attention when preparing for a complex surgery or facing a stack of paperwork 10:30 at night.

=== Effect on patient care ===
A physician's personal smoking habits have been shown to influence his or her attitudes toward the dangers of tobacco. Doctors who smoked were less likely to believe that smoking has a harmful effect on health compared to nonsmokers. Fewer smokers also believed that physicians should serve as role models for their patients and that indoor smoking in hospitals should be prohibited. Nearly all Chinese physicians (95%) believed that active smoking causes lung cancer and most believed that passive smoking causes lung cancer (89%), but current smokers were less likely to hold these health beliefs than nonsmokers were.

== Gender ==
According to the World Bank in 2020, nearly half of men in China were smokers, compared to less than 2% of women. In 2010, smoking caused nearly 1 million (840,000 male, 130,000 female) deaths in China.

China remains one of the three leading countries (along with India and Indonesia) in total number of male smokers, accounted for 51.4% of the world's male smokers in 2015. China also remains one of the three leading countries (along with India and the United States) in total number of female smokers, although these three countries accounted for only 27.3% of the world's female smokers, indicating that the tobacco epidemic is less geographically concentrated for women than for men.

== Smoking culture in China ==
Other than a nicotine product, cigarettes in China include different meanings. In China, 2.4 trillion cigarettes were sold in 2022. This equates to 1800 cigarettes per capita. Behind such consumption of cigarettes, there is an undeniable cultural relationship between cigarettes and Chinese smokers. China's cigarettes are never only for self-pleasure, but they can be used to present respect, hospitality, and even a sign of grown-ups. Younger people can give older people cigarettes as a gift to show respect; people can give cigarettes to strangers to show hospitality; teenagers see smoking as a sign of maturity. Especially for people working in business or art, smokers make up a large proportion of the population. As long as people start to have conversations, cigarettes are a necessity for them to communicate.

=== Cigarette culture in the workplace ===
Smoking cigarettes is a booster to work efficiency and a social lubricant for many Chinese employees. In a survey targeting smokers at workplaces, over 80% of them indicated that they started smoking after they had their first job. When they were asked the reason for picking up smoking, 64.4% of them answered that smoking can help them get acquainted with colleagues and employers faster, and 53.1% of them answered that smoking can help them relax from stressful work.

Because most offices in China are located within high office buildings, smokers generally finish one to two cigarettes at restrooms or on staircases within ten minutes. Although a smoking ban has been issued for decades, there are not enough proper smoking places within the buildings. This directly causes damages to building's cleanliness and brings heavy work to cleaning personnel to clear out the cigarettes butts.

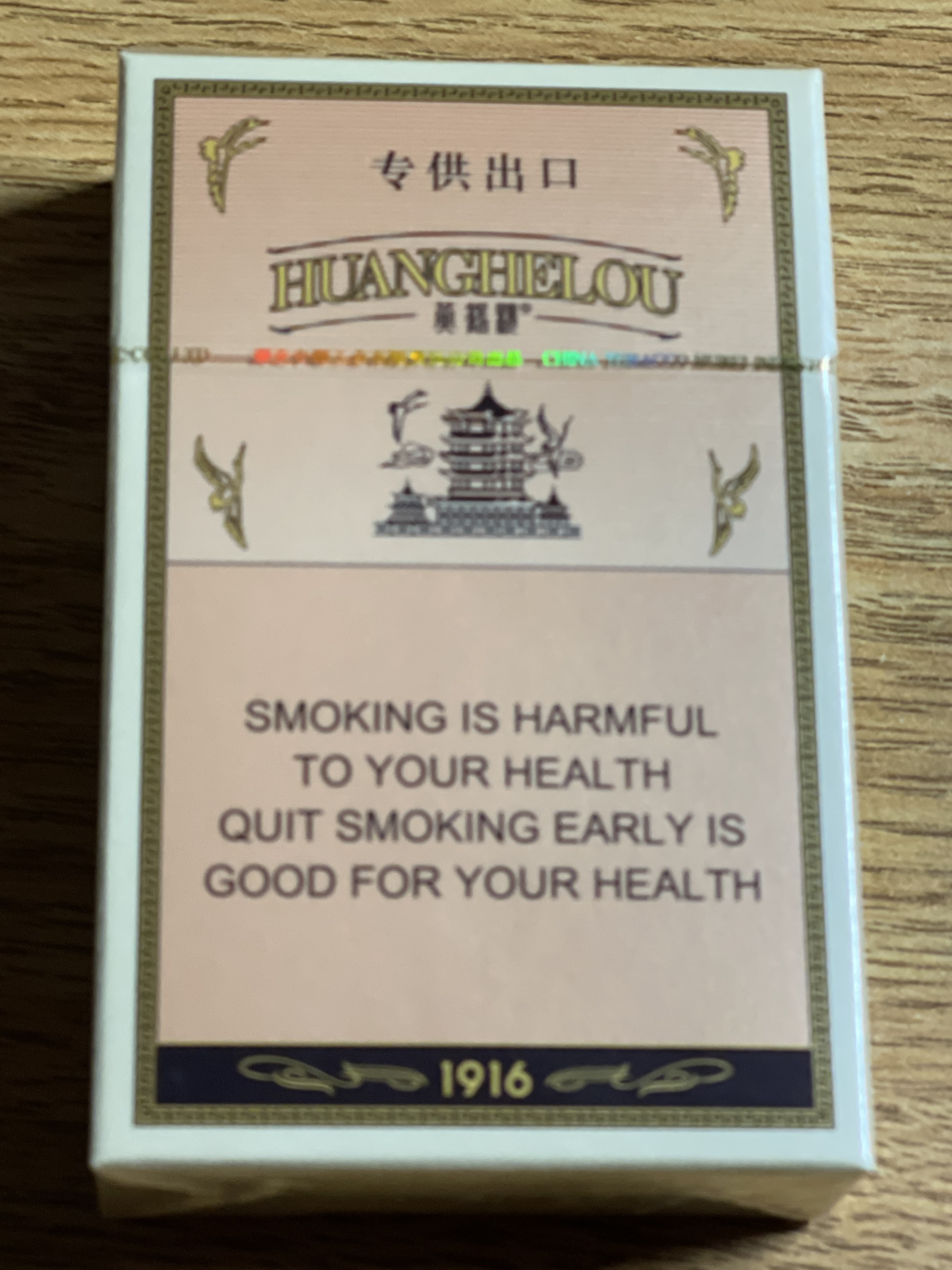
Huanghelou 1916 (Export Version)

== Smoking in Hong Kong ==
Smoking in certain public places in the Hong Kong Special Administrative Region has been banned from 1 January 2007 under the government's revised Smoking (Public Health) Ordinance (Cap. 371), first enacted in 1982 with several amendments subsequently. The latest amendment enlarges the smoking ban to include indoor workplaces, most public places including restaurants, Internet cafés, public lavatories, beaches and most public parks. Some bars, karaoke parlors, saunas and nightclubs were exempt until 1 July 2009. Smoking bans in lifts, public transport, cinemas, concert halls, airport terminal and escalators had been phased in between 1982 and 1997. The ban in shopping centres, department stores, supermarkets, banks and game arcades has been in place since July 1998.

The overall daily smoking rate in Hong Kong is 11.8% (HK Department of Census and Statistics Household Thematic Survey 36) with 25% of males smoking whereas in China 63% of males smoke.

The government mentioned, upon the release of the budget in 2009, that a full ban of tobacco import and smoking is technically possible. However, given the decreasing smoking rate in recent years mainly due to increasing tobacco tax, the government currently has no further plans to control sales of tobacco other than by adjusting taxation.

== See also ==
- Smoking (Public Health) Ordinance
- Betel chewing in China
- Health in China
- Snuff bottle
