= Peter Lai Hing-ling =

Hong Kong politician

Peter Lai Hing-ling JP
- 黎慶寧

Secretary for Security of Hong Kong
- In office 1 July 1995 – 30 August 1998
- Preceded by: Alistair Peter Asprey
- Succeeded by: Regina Ip

Personal details
- Born: 1951 (age 74–75)

Peter Lai
- Traditional Chinese: 黎慶寧
- Simplified Chinese: 黎庆宁
Transcriptions
Standard Mandarin
- Hanyu Pinyin: Lí qìng-níng

Peter Lai Hing-ling, JP (Chinese: 黎慶寧) is a former Hong Kong administrator. From 1995 to 1997, he was Hong Kong's first ethnic Chinese Secretary for Security under colonial rule. He continued to hold the post after the city's handover to China until his resignation in 1998, ending his 25-year career as a civil servant.

== Career ==
While going to school at Queen's College, he had an affinity for basketball and football, and founded the student newspaper, The Courier, in 1969.

Lai graduated from the University of Hong Kong with a first-class honours degree in history (majoring in Modern Chinese History).

In 1973, he joined the Administrative Service, and held various political and managerial posts, including in the New Territories Administration, the Urban Services Department, the Immigration Department, the Lands and Works Branch, the Civil Service Branch and the Constitutional Affairs Branch.

In the mid-1980s he took part in the negotiations between Britain and China on the future of Hong Kong, which led to the Sino-British Joint Declaration on the Question of Hong Kong, as well as in negotiations in 1993 about Hong Kong's new political system. He also contributed to the drafting of the Basic Law.

In February 1995 Lai was appointed the first ethnic Chinese Secretary for Security of the Hong Kong Government. He resigned on 1 August 1998 to spend more time with his family in Australia. Lai said Chief Executive Tung Chee-hwa had asked him to stay and the timing of his resignation was "something which is impossible to explain".

It was speculated that he had to resign since he was also responsible for British intelligence work in Hong Kong, and also because of his strong stance in refusing to share the information held by Hong Kong Police with the Beijing government, though these claims have been dismissed by the Hong Kong government.

Lai set off for Perth in October 1998 to start a career in research.

He was an Associate with the Asia Research Centre at Murdoch University in Perth, Australia, specialising in Hong Kong's politics and constitutional developments from 1998 to 2005. Lai returned to Hong Kong and is now Adviser with the Bauhinia Foundation Research Centre. and an honorary Professor of the Department of Politics and Public Administration of the University of Hong Kong.

Political offices
Preceded by Alistair Asprey	Secretary for Security; 1995–1998	Succeeded by Regina Ip
