= Institution of Plant Engineers =

British institution for engineers and technicians who work with industrial plants

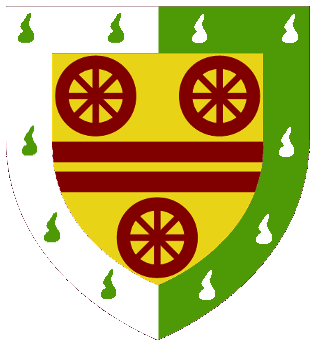
Arms: Or two barrulets between three wheels Gules a bordure per pale Argent and Vert guttee counterchanged.

IPlantE is the (British) Institution of Plant Engineers. It is the professional sector of the Society of Operations Engineers for engineers, technicians and those with an interest in the specification, installation, operation and maintenance of industrial plants and services. It was founded in 1946.

IPlantE publishes a bi-monthly magazine, Plant Engineer and runs a variety of professional activities through its regional branches as well as national seminars on topics such as the ATEX/DSEAR regulations and health and safety in the workplace.

IPlantE members represent a large range of engineering-related activities including static and rotating plant, industrial installation, mobile plant, power generation and distribution, utilities, system design, construction, production and maintenance and repair.
