= Smoking (Public Health) Ordinance =

Legislation of Hong Kong

Legislative Council of Hong Kong
- Long title: An Ordinance to prohibit smoking in certain areas; to provide for the display of a health warning and other information on packets or retail containers of tobacco products; to restrict tobacco advertising; to restrict the sale or giving of tobacco products; to provide for the appointment, powers and duties of inspectors for the enforcement of certain provisions of this Ordinance; and to provide for incidental and related matters.
- Citation: Cap. 371
- Enacted by: Legislative Council of Hong Kong
- Commenced: 30 July 1982

Legislative history
- Introduced by: Secretary for Social Services Eric Peter Ho
- Introduced: 9 July 1982
- First reading: 14 July 1982
- Second reading: 28 July 1982
- Third reading: 28 July 1982
- Status: Current legislation

The Smoking (Public Health) Ordinance is a law in Hong Kong enacted in 1982 for smoking bans and regulation of sales of tobacco products. It has been amended several times ever since and the latest substantial amendment, known as the Smoking (Public Health) (Amendment) Ordinance 2006, was passed by the Legislative Council on 19 October 2006, and gazetted on 27 October 2006.

The 2006 amendment was delayed for six years due to the efforts of the Liberal Party. The law only managed to pass by the government acceding to the Liberal Party's demands for smoking exemptions (expired August 2009). Any licensed bar and karaoke could apply under a paper exercise to receive "Qualified Establishment" status, which was granted by the Department of Health.

The Smoking Ban, as it is commonly referred to, bans smoking indoors in restaurants which sell more food than liquor, indoor workplaces other than exempted bars, mahjong parlours, saunas and karaoke centres, schools, as well as beaches, swimming pools, sports grounds and most public parks. The latest extension of the ban came into force on 1 January 2007. The establishments exempt from the ban would have to be smoke-free by August 2009. The law also empowers the government to designate certain public areas, mainly public transport interchanges, as no-smoking areas. The first group of such places went smoke-free on 1 September 2009. Starting from 31 March 2016, 8 bus interchanges located at tunnel portal areas are also zoned as no-smoking areas.

Packaging, cigarette packets and retail containers must display one of 12 pictorial health warnings covering at least 85% of the two principal display areas. These requirement were applied exclusively as of 21 June 2018 following a six-month transition which began on 21 December 2017.

On 30 April 2022, the Smoking (Public Health) (Amendment) Ordinance 2021 took effect which prohibited the import, promotion, manufacture, sale and possession for commercial purposes of alternative smoking products, including electronic cigarettes, heated tobacco products and herbal cigarettes. The amendment also banned the smoking of an alternative products and carrying an activated product in statutory no-smoking areas.

As of January 2026, smoking is also prohibited while queuing in a line of two or more persons to board public transport at designated boarding locations, within delineated boarding areas, and while queuing to enter public places, anyone found in violation of this ban is subject to the fixed penalty.

Apart from a smoking ban in public places, the newly revised ordinance also imposes more stringent restrictions on sale of tobacco products. Packets must bear health warnings that contain images portraying consequences of smoking.

Subsequently, a bill was presented to the same Legislative Council that streamlined the penalty procedures for someone caught flouting the smoking ban and made it on par with littering offences. The bill was passed on 2008 and took effect on 1 September 2009. Under the new law, anyone caught smoking in prohibited areas would receive a fixed penalty of HK$1,500. The penalty will further increased from HK$1,500 to HK$3,000 as of 1 January 2026, following the implementation of the Tobacco Control Legislation (Amendment) Ordinance 2025.
