= Racism in China =

Racism in China (simplified Chinese: 种族主义; traditional Chinese: 種族主義; pinyin: zhòngzú zhǔyì) arises from Chinese history, nationalism, sinicization, and other factors. Racism in the People's Republic of China has been documented in numerous situations such as the Xinjiang conflict, the ongoing internment and state persecution of Uyghurs and other ethnic minorities, the 2010 Tibetan language protest (a protest against the sinicization of Tibet), the 2020 Inner Mongolia protests (a protest against the sinicization of Inner Mongolia), discrimination against Africans in particular and discrimination against Black people in general.

== Demographic background ==
China is a largely homogeneous society; over 90% of its population is Han Chinese.

== History ==
Ethnic taxonomies were an aspect of Qing dynasty governance since the 1600s. Prejudice against darker skin in China was historically based upon class and related associations with the poverty of laborers working under the sun.

Scientific racist notions of East Asian people belonging to a single "yellow race" were first posited by European naturalists in the 1700s and later introduced to China. Intellectuals of the late Qing dynasty initially embraced social Darwinist racial taxonomies due to admiration of Western science, and as a defense mechanism in response to European colonialism. These intellectuals also accepted a view categorizing Chinese as "yellow," in part due to favorable connotations of "yellow" in Chinese culture. Major Qing-era reformers Yan Fu and Kang Youwei articulated views of Black people as "unintelligent" and Kang advocated for sterilizing Black people to prevent their procreation.

=== People's Republic of China ===
Racist incidents continue to occur in the People's Republic of China (PRC) and they have become a contentious topic because Chinese state sources either deny or downplay its existence. Scholars have noted that the Chinese state's propaganda largely portrays racism as a Western phenomenon, which has contributed to a lack of acknowledgment of the existence of racism in Chinese society. In August 2018, the UN Committee on the Elimination of Racial Discrimination reported that PRC law does not properly define "racial discrimination" and it also lacks an anti-racial discrimination law in line with the Paris Principles.

Since the mid-1990s, the Chinese Communist Party (CCP) has utilized Peking Man as an instrument of its racial nationalist discourse.

In November 2012, in contradiction to the Chinese Communist Party's rhetoric about equality among China's 56 recognized ethnic groups, CCP general secretary Xi Jinping released his model of the Chinese Dream, which has been criticized as Han-centric.

In May 2012, the Chinese government launched a 100-day crackdown on illegal foreigners in Beijing, due to Beijing residents' concerns of foreign nationals due to recent crimes. China Central Television (CCTV) host Yang Rui said, controversially, that "foreign trash" should be cleaned out of the capital. A 2016 Gallup International poll had roughly 30% of Chinese respondents and 53% of Hong Kong respondents agreeing that some races were superior to others.

==== Anti-Chinese sentiment ====
Some Chinese dissidents and critics of the Chinese government have used pejorative slurs (such as shina or locust) against or displayed hatred towards the Chinese language, people, and culture.

===== In Hong Kong =====
Although Hong Kong's sovereignty was returned to China in 1997, only a small minority of its inhabitants consider themselves to be exclusively Chinese. According to a 2014 survey from the University of Hong Kong, 42.3% of respondents identified themselves as "Hong Kong citizens", versus only 17.8% who identified themselves as "Chinese citizens", and 39.3% gave themselves a mixed identity (a Hong Kong Chinese or a Hong Konger who was living in China). By 2019, almost no Hong Kong youth identified as Chinese.

The number of mainland Chinese who visit the region has surged since the handover (it reached 28 million in 2011) and many locals believe that it is the cause of their housing and job difficulties. In addition to resentment which is caused by political oppression, negative perceptions have grown through the circulation of online posts which contain descriptions of mainlander misbehaviour, as well as discriminatory discourse in major Hong Kong newspapers. In 2013, polls from the University of Hong Kong suggested that 32 to 35.6 per cent of locals had "negative" feelings for mainland Chinese people. However, a 2019 survey of Hong Kong residents has suggested that there are also some who attribute positive stereotypes to visitors from the mainland.

In 2012, a group of Hong Kong residents published a newspaper advertisement which depicted mainland visitors and immigrants as locusts, an ethnic slur targeting mainland Chinese people. Strong anti-mainland xenophobia has also been documented amidst the 2019 protests, with reported instances of protesters attacking Mandarin-speakers and mainland-linked businesses.

During protest against mainlanders and parallel traders, local demonstrators chanted the pejorative term Cheena. In October 2015, an HKGolden netizen remade the South Korean song "Gangnam Style", with lyrics calling mainland Chinese "locusts" and "Cheena people", titled "Disgusting Cheena Style" (Chinese: 核突支那Style).

Inside Hong Kong university campuses, mainland Chinese students are often referred to as "Cheena dogs" and "yellow thugs" by local students. Hong Kong journalist Audrey Li noted the xenophobic undertone of the widespread right-wing nativism movement, in which the immigrant population and tourists are used as scapegoats for social inequality and institutional failure.

In a 2015 study, mainland students in Hong Kong who initially had a more positive view of the city than of their own mainland hometowns reported that their attempts at connecting with the locals were difficult due to experiences of hostility.

In Hong Kong, some people consider hate speech and discrimination toward mainland Chinese morally justified by a superiority complex influenced by Hong Kong's economic and cultural prominence during the Cold War, and nostalgia toward British rule. Some protesters choose to express their frustrations on ordinary mainlanders instead of the Chinese government. With rising tribalism and nationalism in Hong Kong and China, xenophobia between Hong Kongers and mainlanders is reinforced and reciprocated.

==== Anti-Japanese sentiment ====
Anti-Japanese sentiment primarily stems from Japanese war crimes which were committed during the Second Sino-Japanese War. History-textbook revisionism in Japan and the denial (or the whitewashing) of events such as the Nanjing Massacre by the Uyoku dantai has continued to inflame anti-Japanese feeling in China. Anti-Japanese sentiment has been encouraged through the CCP's Patriotic Education Campaign. According to a BBC News report, anti-Japanese demonstrations received tacit approval from Chinese authorities, however, the Chinese ambassador to Japan Wang Yi said that the Chinese government does not condone such protests.

==== Anti-Muslim sentiment ====
Recent studies contend that in contemporary China, some Han Chinese have attempted to legitimize and fuel anti-Muslim beliefs and biases by exploiting historical conflicts between the Han Chinese and Muslims, like the Northwest Hui Rebellion. Scholars and researchers have also argued that Western Islamophobia and the "war on terror" have contributed to the mainstreaming of anti-Muslim sentiments and practices in China. Recent studies have shown that Chinese news media coverage of Muslims and Islam is generally negative, in which portrayals of Muslims as dangerous and prone to terrorism, or as recipients of disproportionate aid from the government was common. Studies have also revealed that Chinese cyberspace contains much anti-Muslim rhetoric and that non-Muslim Chinese hold negative views towards Muslims and Islam. Discrimination against Muslims and sinicization of mosques have been reported.

==== Xinjiang conflict and persecution of the Uyghurs ====
The Chinese government and individual Han Chinese citizens have been accused of discrimination against and ethnic hatred towards the Uyghur minority. This was a reported cause of the July 2009 Ürümqi riots, which occurred largely along racial lines. Several Western media sources called them "race riots". According to The Atlantic in 2009, there was an unofficial Chinese policy of denying passports to Uyghurs until they reached retirement age, especially if they intended to leave the country for the pilgrimage to Mecca.

According to academic David Tobin, since 2012, "Chinese education about Uyghurs tends to frame Uyghur identities as racialised, culturally external existential threats to be defeated by state violence or teaching them to be Chinese." Since 2014, the Chinese Communist Party under the leadership of the general secretaryship of Xi Jinping has pursued a policy which has led to the imprisonment of more than one million Muslims (the majority of them are Uyghurs) in secretive re-education camps without any legal process. Critics of the policy have described it as the sinicization of Xinjiang and they have also called it an ethnocide or a cultural genocide, and many activists, NGOs, human rights organizations, government officials, and the U.S. government have called it a genocide. The Chinese government did not acknowledge the existence of these re-education camps until 2018 and when it finally acknowledged their existence, it called them "vocational education and training centers" rather than re-education camps. In 2019, the name of these camps was officially changed to "vocational training centers". From 2018 to 2019, despite the Chinese government's claim that most of the detainees had been released, the camps tripled in size.

There are widespread reports of forced abortion, contraception, and sterilization both inside and outside the re-education camps. NPR reports that a 37-year-old pregnant woman from the Xinjiang region said that she attempted to give up her Chinese citizenship to live in Kazakhstan but was told by the Chinese government that she needed to come back to China to complete the process. She alleges that officials seized the passports of her and her two children before coercing her into receiving an abortion to prevent her brother from being detained in an re-education camp. Zumrat Dwut, a Uyghur woman, claimed that she was forcibly sterilized by tubal ligation during her time in a camp before her husband was able to get her out through requests to Pakistani diplomats. The Xinjiang regional government denies that she was forcibly sterilized. The Associated Press reports that there is a "widespread and systematic" practice of forcing Uyghur women to take birth control medication in the Xinjiang region, and many women have stated that they have been forced to receive contraceptive implants. The Heritage Foundation reported that officials forced Uyghur women to take unknown drugs and to drink some kind of white liquid that caused them to lose consciousness and sometimes causes them to cease menstruation altogether.

Beginning in 2018, over one million Chinese government workers began forcibly living in the homes of Uyghur families to monitor and assess resistance to assimilation, and to watch for frowned-upon religious or cultural practices.

In March 2020, the Chinese government was found to be using the Uyghur minority for forced labor, inside sweat shops. According to a report published then by the Australian Strategic Policy Institute (ASPI), no fewer than around 80,000 Uyghurs were forcibly removed from the region of Xinjiang and used for forced labor in at least twenty-seven corporate factories. According to the Business and Human Rights resource center, corporations such as Abercrombie & Fitch, Adidas, Amazon, Apple, BMW, Fila, Gap, H&M, Inditex, Marks & Spencer, Nike, North Face, Puma, PVH, Samsung, and UNIQLO have each sourced from these factories prior to the publication of the ASPI report.

==== Discrimination against Tibetans ====
Anti-Tibetan racism has been practiced by ethnic Han Chinese on some occasions. Ever since its inception, the Chinese Communist Party (CCP), the sole legal ruling political party of the PRC (including Tibet), has been distributing historical documents which portray Tibetan culture as barbaric in order to justify Chinese control of the territory of Tibet, and is widely endorsed by Han Chinese nationalists. As such, many members of Chinese society have a negative view of Tibet which can be interpreted as racism. The CCP's view is that Tibet was historically a feudal society which practiced serfdom/slavery and that this only changed due to the annexation of Tibet by the People's Republic of China.

==== Discrimination against Mongols ====
Under Xi Jinping, the CCP undertakes a policy of sinicizing Inner Mongolia by gradually replacing Mongolian languages with Mandarin Chinese. Critics have accused the Chinese government of committing cultural genocide because it is dismantling people's minority languages and eradicating their minority identities. The 2020 Inner Mongolia protests were caused by a curriculum reform which was imposed on ethnic schools by China's Inner Mongolian Department of Education. The reform replaced Mongolian with Standard Mandarin as the medium of instruction in particular subjects and it also replaced regional textbooks which were printed in the Mongolian script with Ministry of Education-authorized textbooks written in Standard Mandarin. On a broader scale, the opposition to the curriculum change reflects the decline of regional language education in China.

On 20 September 2020, up to 5,000 ethnic Mongolians were arrested in Inner Mongolia for protesting against the enactment of policies that outlawed their nomadic pastoralist lifestyle. The director of the Southern Mongolian Human Rights Information Center (SMHRIC), Enghebatu Togochog, called the CCP's policy a "cultural genocide". Two-thirds of the 6 million ethnic Mongolians who live in Inner Mongolia practice a nomadic lifestyle that they have practiced for millennia.

Genghis Khan and his origins have been increasingly censored by the authorities within China alongside attempts to censor them outside of the country. In October 2020, the Chinese government asked the Nantes History Museum in France not to use the words "Genghis Khan" and "Mongolia" in the exhibition project which it dedicated to the life of Genghis Khan and the history of the Mongol Empire. The Nantes History Museum conducted the exhibition project in partnership with the Inner Mongolia Museum in Hohhot, China. The Nantes History Museum halted the exhibition project. In response, the director of the Nantes museum, Bertrand Guillet, stated: "Tendentious elements of rewriting aimed at completely eliminating Mongolian history and culture in favor of a new national narrative".

==== Discrimination against Africans and people of African descent ====
According to historian Yinghong Cheng, "a relationship between two racially superior/inferior human groups is either implied or demonstrated" in Chinese narratives and discourses toward Africans. Academic Mingwei Huang contends that Han racial nationalism contains "latent antiblackness." Reports of racial discrimination against Africans in China have been published by foreign media outlets since the 1970s. Publicized incidents of discrimination against Africans have included the Nanjing anti-African protests in 1988 and a 1989 student-led protest in Beijing in response to an African dating a Chinese person. Police action against Africans in Guangzhou has also been reported as discriminatory. In 2009, accusations which were made by Chinese media in which it stated that the number of African undocumented immigrants who were residing in China could be as high as 200,000 people sparked racist attacks against Africans and mixed African-Chinese people on the internet. In 2017, a museum exhibit in Wuhan was condemned for comparing Africans to wild animals and was pulled soon after amid outrage. In 2018, the CCTV New Year's Gala sparked controversies because it included blackface performances in which Africans were portrayed as submissive recipients of the support which they received from China. During the CCTV New Year's Gala in 2021, Chinese actors again put on blackface; the Chinese Foreign minister denied that the performance was racist.

According to BBC News, in 2020, many people in China have expressed solidarity with the Black Lives Matter movement. The George Floyd protests have reportedly sparked conversations about race that would have not otherwise occurred in the country, including treatment of China's own ethnic minorities. Observers have noted the apparent contradiction between the government's foreign policy toward Africa and its tolerance of racial hostility toward Africans on Chinese social media in an otherwise highly censored environment.

In the late 2010s, videos about Africans holding a written Chinese blackboard and chanting in Chinese went viral on Chinese social media. In February 2020, a video in which African children chanted, "I am a black devil and my IQ is low", was spread on Chinese social media. A group of BBC reporters traced the video's origin and created a documentary, Racism for Sale, on BBC Africa Eye, after Wode Maya expressed his fury at it. In the documentary, reporters revealed the video was made by a Chinese videographer located in Malawi. They also revealed abuses when creating videos and the videographers' racist attitude towards African people. After the documentary was released, pressure from Malawi was piling on the Malawian government. The videographer was later arrested and expelled from Malawi.

Racist content against Black people or representations of Black people is widespread on the internet in China. On Chinese social media, Black people are often framed as a demographic threat. Interracial relationships involving Africans result in virulent online criticism. According to academic Kun Huang, each time a mixed-race Chinese-African person has gone viral on social media, a nationalist backlash has ensued. In 2025, it was reported that AI-generated videos that contained racist stereotypes about Black people were spreading on Chinese social media platforms.

===== COVID-19 pandemic =====
The number of reported acts of racism against Africans and against black foreigners of African descent increased in China during the COVID-19 pandemic in mainland China. Black foreigners not from Africa have also faced racism and discrimination in China. In response to criticism over COVID-19 related racism and discrimination against Africans in China, Chinese authorities set up a hotline for foreign nationals and laid out measures discouraging businesses and rental houses in Guangzhou from refusing people based on race or nationality. Foreign Ministry spokesman Zhao Lijian claimed that the country has "zero tolerance" for discrimination. CNN stated that this claim ignored the decades' long history of racism and discrimination against Africans in China which predated the COVID-19 pandemic. During the 2022 Shanghai lockdown, viral locally produced videos of Africans shouting scripted, positive wishes to the Chinese audience have been criticized as stereotypical and even dehumanizing.

===== Hong Kong =====
Since 2008, it has been reported that many Africans have experienced racism in Hong Kong, such as being subjected to humiliating police searches on the streets, being avoided on public transports, and being barred from bars and clubs.

==== Discrimination against South and Southeast Asians ====
There have been reports of widespread discrimination in Hong Kong against South Asian minorities regarding housing, employment, public services, and checks by the police. A 2001 survey found that 82% of ethnic minority respondents said they had suffered discrimination from shops, markets, and restaurants in Hong Kong. A 2020 survey found that more than 90% of ethnic minority respondents experienced some form of housing discrimination. Foreign domestic workers, mostly South Asians, have been at risk of forced labor, subpar accommodation, and verbal, physical, or sexual abuse by employers. A 2016 survey from Justice Centre Hong Kong suggested that 17% of migrant domestic workers were engaged in forced labor, while 94.6% showed signs of exploitation.

Filipina women in Hong Kong are often reportedly stereotyped as promiscuous, disrespectful, and lacking self-control. Reports of racist abuse from Hong Kong fans towards their Filipino counterparts at a 2013 football game came to light, after an increased negative image of the Philippines from the 2010 Manila hostage crisis. In 2014, an insurance ad, as well as a school textbook, drew some controversy for alleged racial stereotyping of Filipina maids.

Some Pakistanis in 2013 reported of banks barring them from opening accounts because they came from a 'terrorist country', as well as locals next to them covering their mouths thinking they smell, finding their beard ugly, or stereotyping them as claiming welfare benefits fraudulently. A 2014 survey of Pakistani and Nepalese construction workers in Hong Kong found that discrimination and harassment from local colleagues led to perceived mental stress, physical ill health, and reduced productivity.

South Asian minorities in Hong Kong faced increased xenophobia during the COVID-19 pandemic, with media narratives blaming them as more likely to spread the virus.

Anti-Indian sentiment is common in Chinese social media. In 2023, a video shared by a Douyin account of the Ministry of Public Security of actors in brownface singing an Indian song received widespread criticism. The video was deleted soon after. In 2026, Chinese ambassador to India Xu Feihong suffered nationalist backlash on Chinese social media for promoting people-to-people ties with India.

In July 2026, the Department of Foreign Affairs of the Philippines denounced an AI-generated video published and spread by Chinese state-controlled media China Daily that portrayed Filipinos as monkeys, calling it racist and dehumanizing propaganda. The video was published by China, amid tensions in the South China Sea, after the anniversary of the 2016 South China Sea Arbitration ruling which legally invalidated the so-called nine-dash line of China. The racist video was criticized globally and was widely reported.

==== Discrimination against Jews ====
Antisemitism in China is a mostly 21st century phenomenon and is complicated by the fact that there is little ground for antisemitism in China in historical sources. Public consciousness of Jews in China has a variety of historical influences. Academic Eric Reinders of Emory University states that these include "Protestant missionaries, Jews as a model for Chinese immigrants, Japanese anti-Jewish articles circulated in China in the 1930s, the presence of European Jewish refugees in Shanghai, and the politics around Israel as a proxy of US imperialism." Reinders writes that Chinese stereotypes of Jews are based in positive generalizations more than negative ones. Jews are praised for valuing education like Chinese, although this is often also framed competitively. Some mass market books associate Jews with wealth-building. In the 2020s, antisemitic conspiracy theories in China began to spread and intensify. Some Chinese people believe in antisemitic tropes that Jews secretly rule the world.

==== Discrimination against and biases in favor of European and European-descended people ====
===== Discrimination =====
Russians form one of China's 56 officially recognized ethnic groups. Many Chinese citizens of Russian descent were subject to discrimination due to their perceived differences from the majority Han Chinese population and accusations of being "Soviet spies" during the 20th century.

In the late 2010s, Dong Desheng, a Chinese citizen of Russian descent who was born in Heilongjiang province, become a "social media sensation" in China after posting videos of himself and his daily life under the screen name "Uncle Petrov". Some Chinese internet users were "confused" by Desheng's appearance, asking him if he wore "colored contact lenses" as they could not believe that a Chinese citizen could have naturally blue eyes. As he gained more popularity online, Desheng raised discussions about what it means to be "Chinese", as the term is largely synonymous with people of Han Chinese ethnicity and stereotypical appearance. In a 2022 interview, Desheng discussed how Russians and many other minorities in China have attempted to assimilate into the majority Han Chinese culture; forgoing their ancestral culture in fear of being discriminated against.

===== Biases =====
The Los Angeles Times and Vice Media alleged that a hiring preference for white English teachers over members of other groups is common in China. In 2014, a Media Diversified article by a former English teacher in Ningbo alleged that the English teaching industry was responsible for "painting the image of 'good English' as a domain reserved for white people" and it also highlighted the need for a more diverse staff in the industry.

==== International responses ====
In terms of international responses to China's policies towards Tibetans, Uyghurs and Mongols in the Tibet Autonomous Region, Xinjiang, and the Inner Mongolia Autonomous Region respectively, many people outside Mongolia know about the Chinese government's human rights abuses against the Uyghurs and the Tibetans, but few of them know about the plight of the Mongols. An international petition which is titled "Save Education in Inner Mongolia" has currently received less than 21,000 signatures. Former U.S. President Trump signed the Uyghur Human Rights Policy Act of 2020 into law, and the Tibetan Policy and Support Act of 2019 has passed the House of Representatives. The Southern Mongolian Congress, an Inner Mongolian activist group based out of Japan, has since written an open letter asking the U.S. Congress to do the same for the Mongols.

Much of the world has condemned the Chinese government's detention of Uyghurs. In January 2021, U.S. Secretary of State Mike Pompeo declared that China is committing crimes against humanity and genocide against the Uyghurs, making the U.S. the first country to apply those terms to the Chinese government's human rights abuses. While he was campaigning, U.S. President Joe Biden used the term genocide in reference to the Chinese government's human rights abuses, and his secretary of state, namely Antony Blinken, affirmed Pompeo's declaration.

Japan did not join the U.S. and several other nations in March 2021 in imposing sanctions on China over its repression of its mostly Muslim Uyghur majority. However, in April 2021, during a 90-minute phone conversation with Chinese Foreign Minister Wang Yi, Japanese Foreign Minister Toshimitsu Motegi called on his Chinese counterpart to take action to improve human-rights conditions for Uyghurs. This message from Tokyo came shortly before Prime Minister Yoshihide Suga traveled to the U.S. for a summit with President Biden on 16 April. South Korea has remained quiet about Xinjiang.

== Ethnic slurs ==
According to historian Frank Dikötter,

A common historical response to serious threats directed towards a symbolic universe is "nihilation", or the conceptual liquidation of everything inconsistent with official doctrine. Foreigners were labelled "barbarians" or "devils", to be conceptually eliminated. The official rhetoric reduced the Westerner to a devil, a ghost, an evil and unreal goblin hovering on the border of humanity. Many texts of the first half of the nineteenth century referred to the English as "foreign devils" (yangguizi), "devil slaves" (guinu), "barbarian devils" (fangui), "island barbarians" (daoyi), "blue-eyed barbarian slaves" (biyan yinu), or "red-haired barbarians" (hongmaofan).

=== Graphic pejoratives about race and ethnicity ===
Chinese orthography provides opportunities to write ethnic insults logographically; this is known as "graphic pejoratives". This originated in the fact that Chinese characters used to transcribe the names of non-Chinese peoples were graphically pejorative ethnic slurs, where the insult was not the Chinese word but the character used to write it. The sinologist Endymion Wilkinson says,

At the same time as finding characters to fit the sounds of a foreign word or name it is also possible to choose ones with a particular meaning, in the case of non-Han peoples and foreigners, usually a pejorative meaning. It was the practice, for example, to choose characters with an animal or reptile signific for southern non-Han peoples, and many northern peoples were given characters for their names with the dog or leather hides signific. In origin this practice may have derived from the animal totems or tribal emblems typical of these peoples. This is not to deny that in later Chinese history such graphic pejoratives fitted neatly with Han convictions of the superiority of their own culture as compared to the uncultivated, hence animal-like, savages and barbarians.

=== List of ethnic slurs in Chinese ===
- 鬼子 (guǐzi) – "Guizi", devils, refers to foreigners
  - 日本鬼子 (rìběn guǐzi) – literally "Japanese devil", used to refer to Japanese, can be translated as Jap. In 2010 Japanese internet users on 2channel created the fictional moe character Hinomoto Oniko (日本鬼子) which refers to the ethnic term, with Hinomoto Oniko being the Japanese kun'yomi reading of the Han characters "日本鬼子".
  - 二鬼子 (èr guǐzi) – literally "second devil", used to refer to Korean soldiers who were a part of the Japanese army during the Sino-Japanese war in World War II.
- Xiao Riben (小日本, "Small Japanese, Small Japan")
- 鬼佬 – Gweilo, literally "ghostly man" (directed at Europeans)
- 黑鬼 (hei guǐ, hak gwei) – "Black ghost", "Black monster", "Black devil" (directed at Africans).
- 阿三 (asae) or 紅頭阿三 (ghondeu asae) - Originally a Shanghainese term used against Indians, it is also used in Mandarin.
- 纏頭 (chántóu, "turbans") – used during the Republican period against Uyghurs
- Erzhuanzi (二轉子) – ethnically mixed The term was said by European explorers in the 19th century to refer to a people descended from Chinese, Taghliks, and Mongols living in the area from Ku-ch'eng-tze to Barköl in Xinjiang.
- Gaoli bangzi (高麗棒子, "Korean Stick") – Used against Koreans, both North Koreans and South Koreans.

== See also ==
- Hua–Yi distinction
- Multiracial people in China
- Regional discrimination in China
  - Anti-Henan sentiment

== Bibliography ==
- Fischer, Andrew Martin (2005). "Close encounters of an Inner-Asian kind: Tibetan–Muslim coexistence and conflict in Tibet, past and present" (PDF). CSRC Working Paper Series (Working Paper no.68). Crisis States Research Centre. Archived from the original (PDF) on 3 January 2006.
- Forbes, Andrew D. W. (1986). Warlords and Muslims in Chinese Central Asia: a political history of Republican Sinkiang 1911–1949. Cambridge, UK: Cambridge University Press. ISBN 978-0-521-25514-1.
- Lin, Hsaio-ting (2011). Tibet and Nationalist China's Frontier: Intrigues and Ethnopolitics, 1928–49. UBC Press. ISBN 978-0-7748-5988-2.
- Nietupski, Paul Kocot (1999). Labrang: a Tibetan Buddhist monastery at the crossroads of four civilizations. Snow Lion Publications. ISBN 1-55939-090-5.
- Starr, S. Frederick (2004). Xinjiang: China's Muslim borderland. M.E. Sharpe. ISBN 0-7656-1318-2.
