= List of protests in Hong Kong =

Hong Kong protests refers to various protests, demonstrations, or marches that have taken place in Hong Kong. It may refer to:

== Annual events ==
- New year marches
- 1 July marches
- Memorials for the 1989 Tiananmen Square protests and massacre

== Individual events ==
- 1956 riots
- 1966 riots
- 1967 riots
- 1981 riots
- December 2005 protest for democracy in Hong Kong
- 2010 Marches for Universal Suffrage
- Occupy Central (2011–12)
- Anti-parallel trading protests, 2012 to 2015
  - Reclaim Sheung Shui Station, 2012
  - 2015 Yuen Long protest
- 2012 Kong Qingdong incident
- 2013 dock strike
- 2014 Umbrella Revolution
  - Umbrella Movement
  - 2014 Hong Kong class boycott campaign
- 2016 Mong Kok civil unrest
- 2019 Anti-Extradition Bill Movement (timeline)
  - 12 June
  - Storming of the Legislative Council Complex
  - Hong Kong Way
  - Chinese University of Hong Kong conflict
  - Siege of the Hong Kong Polytechnic University
  - Local effects of the Hong Kong national security law

== See also ==
- 1970s Hong Kong student protests
- Hong Kong–Mainland China conflict
- Democratic development in Hong Kong
- 1989 Tiananmen Square protests
- Human rights in Hong Kong
