= Regional discrimination in China =

Prejudice based on place of origin

Regional discrimination in the People's Republic of China or regionalism is overt prejudice against people based on their places of origin, ethnicity, sub-ethnicity, language, dialect, or their current provincial zones. China's sheer size and population renders much demographic understanding tied to locality, and there is often little life movement outside of a citizen's province of birth. Historically, internal migration has been tightly controlled, and many barriers to free movement exist today. Treatment of ethnic minorities and Han Chinese regional groups can hinge on preferential assumptions based on places of upbringing, and is often most pronounced towards those born external to urban zones.

When Chinese migrants settle in a new region, local residents can develop social attitudes and prejudgments based on the newcomer's place of birth. If a large volume of new residents relocate from a particular area, regionalism can manifest as sub-ethnic bias and provoke social tension.

Currently, the Chinese Communist Party (CCP) defines regionalism as adverse action or negative attitudes against another based on their home province. The Chinese state acknowledges this as a detrimental yet pervasive prejudice.

Regional discrimination there can also be discrimination against person or a group of people who speak a particular language dialect.

The hukou household registry is a system that has been criticized as an entrenchment of social strata, especially as between rural and urban residency status, and is regarded by some as a form of caste system. Internal migrants in China, particularly those hailing from Henan and the northeast, frequently experience challenging lives.

== History ==
Regionalism has long been part of society in China. Generally, southern China is thought to be more regionalist than northern China. The Hakka people, despite being considered Han Chinese, were traditionally hated and despised by the Cantonese. This is thought to have led to various conflict such as the bloody Hakka-Punti Wars.

== In Mainland China ==
=== In university admittance ===
A university usually sets a fixed admission quota for each province, with a higher number of students coming from its home province. As the quantity and the quality of universities vary greatly across China, it is argued that students face discrimination during the admission process based on their region. However, this kind of discrimination is improved. For example, in recent decades, Beijing colleges and universities have significantly increased their admission scores for Beijing students, where the score lines for Beijing students are clearly at the forefront in comparison with the score lines for other provinces students. When comparing the local enrollment ratios of universities in all provinces, it can be seen that the proportion of domestic students enrolled in Beijing colleges and universities is much lower than the percentage of local students in other provinces.

=== In recruitment ===
In China's early days, the application of civil servant was offered mainly to the locals. The residence registration normally appears on personal identification documents and has led many employers and local governments to discriminate based on the permanent residence of applicants. But now this discrimination is reversed, for example, many companies in Beijing refuse to recruit Beijingers because they believe that locals in Beijing are lazy, leading to a high unemployment rate among locals.

=== In urban and rural areas ===
After the Communist Party took power of mainland China, the Chinese government began using the family register system to control the movement of people between urban and rural areas. Individuals were broadly categorised as "rural" or "urban" workers. Urban dwellers enjoyed a range of social, economic and cultural benefits, and China's 800 million rural residents were treated as second-class citizens.

The millions of people who have left village life remain stuck at the margins of urban society and have been blamed for issues of rising crime and unemployment. Under pressure from their cities' citizens, regional governments continue to impose discriminatory rules. For example, the children of "Nong Min Gong" (rural workers) are not allowed to enter city schools. They must live with their grandparents or uncles to go to their local hometown schools. They are called home-staying children by Chinese governments. In 2005, Chinese researchers reported that there are about 130 million home-staying children living away from their parents.

=== Against specific areas ===
As a result of unbalanced economic development, unfair discrimination usually follows the specific regional stereotyping held by a society.

==== Henan ====
Henan is often described by people from other parts of China as "crammed with thieves, ruffians, grifters and con artists". Many rural farmers and migrant workers from Henan suffer abusive consequences from the privileged state system and media portrayal. The reasons for discrimination include having the largest farmer population in China, the huge number of rural workers migrating to cities, and the continuous emigration of refugees and victims from natural calamities and political tragedies in the 20th century.

==== Hubei ====
In modern China, "nine-headed Bird" is a derogatory term for Hubei people, used to mock Hubei people for being "cunning and deceitful." A famous proverb is "Above heaven there are nine-headed birds, on earth there are cunning Hubei people".

During the COVID-19 pandemic, many mainland Chinese refused the admission of Hubei residents or people originating from Hubei from dining and accommodations.

==== Beijing ====
Due to the responsibility of Beijing as the capital and the hospitality of Beijingers, Beijing has vigorously promoted the slogan that belongs to this city, called the Beijing Spirit. However, this kind of hospitality has not been exchanged for equal respect. Beijingers welcome these people who come to Beijing to start their careers. Still, these people begin to discriminate against Beijingers because they believe that Beijingers are inferior to them in intelligence and effort so that even job opportunities are unwilling to be offered to Beijingers.

==== Shanghai ====
As migrants, most from southwestern or central China (Henan and southwestern Shanxi), flow increasingly into Shanghai, they are often blamed for the rising crime and unemployment. They are often attracted by the Shanghai hukou for its convenience and social benefits. Consequently, sometimes Shanghai residents are also despised and discriminated against by people from rural regions.

==== Guangdong ====
People from places in China outside Guangdong who do not speak local languages like Cantonese, Teochew, or Hakka, are called "北佬" or "北姑" (literally, "Northern guys" or "Northern girls"). In particular, in the early 1980s, longtime Guangdong residents shunned migrant workers who they stereotyped as showering less than locals, and as not willing to learn Cantonese. The Hong Kong–Mainland China conflict has also inflamed regionalism, since Hong Kong shares a border with Guangdong.

Linguistic conflicts related to Cantonese include incidents like the Guangzhou Television Cantonese controversy, and one where a school in Guangzhou which introduced a Cantonese-only textbook into classes was accused of "promoting separatism" by some northerners. The project was shut down by local authorities because of the controversy.

Besides that, there is also discriminatory laws that require southern provinces in general to have to pay fines at higher rates (in relation to local income levels) for going against China's family planning policies, than their northern counterparts.

== In Hong Kong ==
A 2012 full-page advertisement funded by a group of Hong Kong residents, in Hong Kong tabloid Apple Daily, called mainland Chinese "locusts". In 2013, the death of a 25-year-old female mainlander who was hit by a truck near Quarry Bay drew abusive and anti-mainland comments on sites like Facebook, HKGolden, and Apple Daily. In a 2015 study, mainland Chinese students in Hong Kong who initially had a more positive view of the city than of their own mainland hometowns reported that their attempts at connecting with the locals were difficult due to experiences of hostility and a sense of inferiority provoked by locals. Mainland Chinese working and studying in Hong Kong regularly experience discrimination, regardless of their level of assimilation. Hong Kong surveys indicated mainland Chinese speaking Cantonese were mocked due to their accents, denied work opportunities, and suffered mental health issues.

Anti-mainland sentiment during the 2019–20 Hong Kong protests has led to some attacks on mainlanders and China-linked businesses. In 2020, following the protests and during the COVID-19 pandemic it was reported that over 100 restaurants in Hong Kong refused to serve mainland Chinese customers.

== See also ==
- Social issues in China
- Chinese Singaporeans
- Racism in China
