= Shina (word) =

Largely archaic name for China

Chinese name
- Chinese: 支那
Transcriptions
Standard Mandarin
- Hanyu Pinyin: Zhīnà
- Bopomofo: ㄓ ㄋㄚˋ
- Gwoyeu Romatzyh: Jynah
- Wade–Giles: Chih^{1}-na^{4}
Wu
- Romanization: Tsy^{平} na^{去}
Hakka
- Romanization: Zii^{1}-na^{4}
Yue: Cantonese
- Yale Romanization: Jīnàh
- Jyutping: Zi^{1}na^{5}
Southern Min
- Hokkien POJ: Chi-ná

Japanese name
- Kanji: 支那
- Katakana: シナ
Transcriptions
- Romanization: Shina

Shina is a largely archaic name for China. It traces its origin to an ancient Sanskrit word used by people from India who had established contact in the region. Its use in Japanese originally had a neutral connotation, but the word came to be perceived as derogatory by Chinese people during the course of the First and Second Sino-Japanese Wars. As a result, it fell into disuse after World War II and is now viewed as offensive, with the standard Japanese name for China being replaced by Chūgoku (中国).

During the 2019–2020 Hong Kong protests, the word was used as a form of protest against the Chinese government but also as a xenophobic remark against mainland Chinese.

== Origins and early usage ==
The Sanskrit word चीन (Cina), meaning "China", was transcribed into various forms including 支那 (Zhīnà), 芝那 (Zhīnà), 脂那 (Zhīnà) and 至那 (Zhìnà). Thus, the term Shina was initially created as a transliteration of Cina, and this term was in turn brought to Japan with the spread of Chinese Buddhism. Some scholars believe that the Sanskrit Cina, like Middle Persian Čīn and Latin Sina, is derived from the name of the state of Qin, which founded a dynasty (秦, Old Chinese: *dzin) that ruled China from 221 to 206 BC, and so Shina is a return of Qin to Chinese in a different form.

The Sanskrit term for China eventually spread into China, where its usage was closely related to Buddhism. A Tang dynasty (618–907) poem titled Ti Fan Shu (題梵書, literally "topic of a Sanskrit book") by Emperor Xuanzong of Tang uses the term in Chinese 支那 (Zhīnà) to refer to China, which is an early use of the word in China:

《題梵書》
鶴立蛇形勢未休，
五天文字鬼神愁。
支那弟子無言語，
穿耳胡僧笑點頭。

Translation:

"Ti Fan Shu" ("Topic of a Sanskrit book")
Whether the situation is straight-up or winding is unclear.
Texts from India have the ghosts and gods worried.
The disciples in Zhina are speechless.
The monk with pierced ears nodded with a smile.

== Early modern usage ==
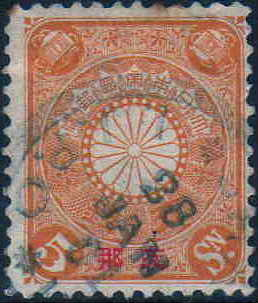
A 1900 Japan Post 5-sen stamp with Shina

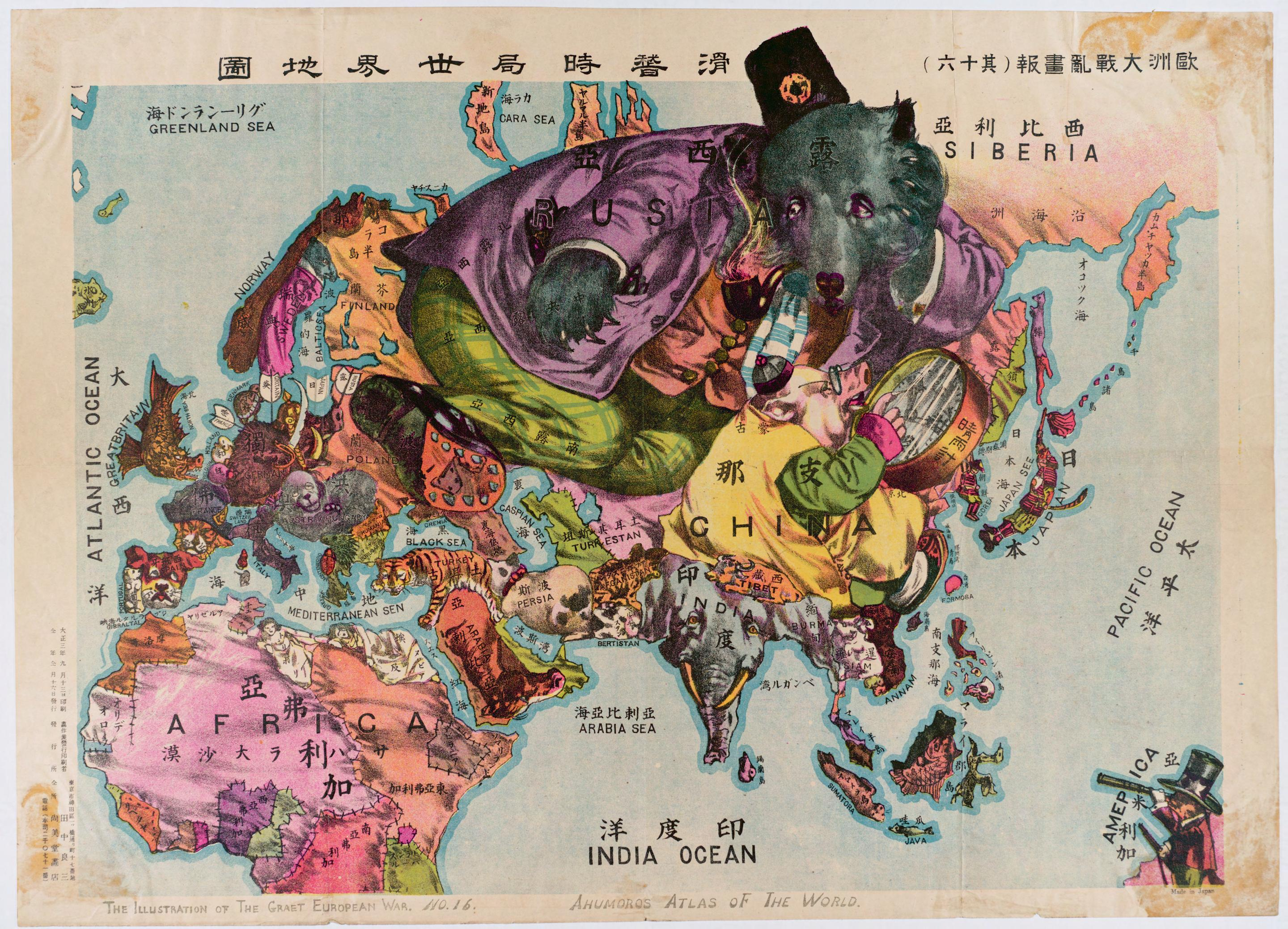
A Japanese illustration of 1914 depicting the nations as animals – with Russia as a bear smoking a pipe, China as a pig consulting a barometer, India an elephant, Britain a carp, Germany a boar, etc.

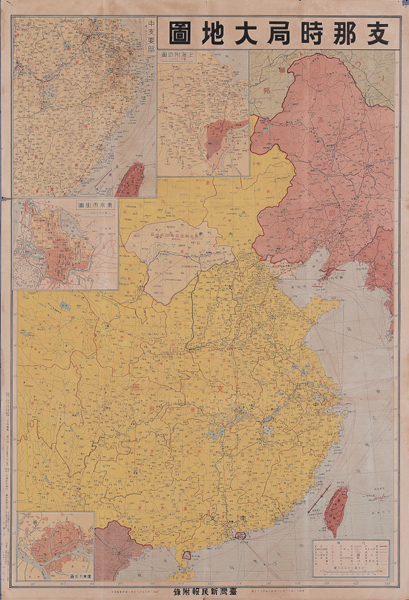
A 1937 Japanese map of Shina

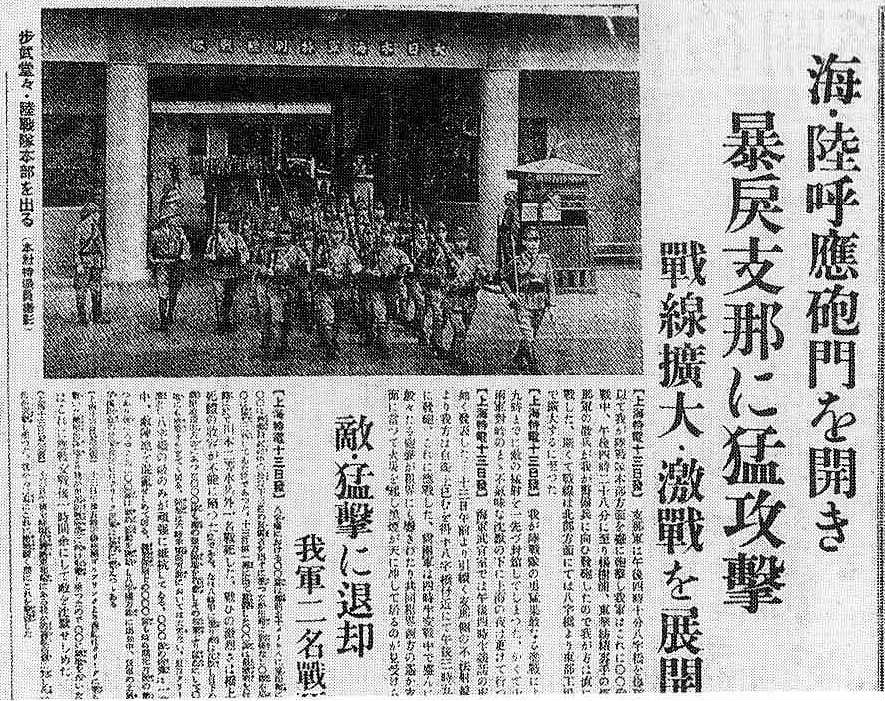
Asahi Shimbun reporting on the Shanghai incident of 14 August 1937, referring to the Republic of China as "Shina tyranny"

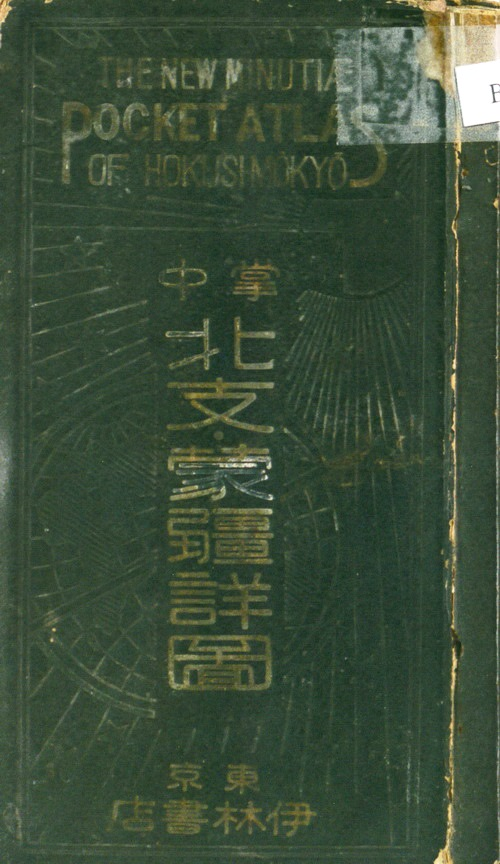
The 1939 New Minutiae Pocket Atlas of Northern Shina, Mongolia and Xinjiang

The Latin term for China was Sinae, plural of Sina. When Arai Hakuseki, a Japanese scholar, interrogated the Italian missionary Giovanni Battista Sidotti in 1708, he noticed that Sinae, the Latin plural word Sidotti used to refer to China, was similar to Shina, the Japanese pronunciation of 支那. Then he began to use this word for China regardless of dynasty. Since the Meiji Era, Shina had been widely used as the translation of the Western term "China". For instance, "sinology" was translated as "Shinagaku" (支那學).

At first, it was widely accepted that the term Shina or Zhina had no political connotations in China. Before the Chinese Republican era, the term Shina was one of the names proposed as a "generalized, basically neutral Western-influenced equivalent for 'China'". Chinese revolutionaries, such as Sun Yat-sen, Song Jiaoren, and Liang Qichao, used the term extensively, and it was also used in literature as well as by ordinary Chinese. The term "transcended politics, as it were, by avoiding reference to a particular dynasty or having to call China the country of the Qing". With the overthrow of the Qing in 1911, however, most Chinese dropped Shina as foreign and demanded that Japan replace it with the Japanese reading of the Chinese characters used as the name of the new Republic of China Chūka Minkoku (中華民國), with the short form Chūgoku (中國).

Nevertheless, the term continued to be more-or-less neutral. A Buddhist school called Zhīnà Nèixuéyuàn (支那內學院) was established as late as in 1922 in Nanjing. In the meantime, Shina was used as commonly in Japanese as "China" in English. Derogatory nuances were expressed by adding extra adjectives, e.g. Japanese: 暴虐なる支那兵, romanized: bōgyaku-naru Shina-hei, lit. 'cruel Shina soldiers' or using derogatory terms like chankoro (チャンコロ).

Despite interchangeability of Chinese characters, Japan officially used the term Shina Kyōwakoku (支那共和國) from 1913 to 1930 in Japanese documents, while Zhōnghuá mínguó (中華民國) was used in Chinese ones. Shina kyōwakoku was the literal translation of the English "Republic of China" while Chūka minkoku was the Japanese pronunciation of the official Chinese characters of Zhōnghuá mínguó. The Republic of China unofficially pressed Japan to adopt the latter but was rejected.

Japan rejected the terms Chūka minkoku and its short form 中國 (Chūgoku) for four reasons:

1. A term referring to China as the "Middle kingdom" or the "center of the world" was deemed arrogant
2. Western countries used "China"
3. Shina had been the common name in Japan for centuries
4. Japan already has a Chūgoku region, in the west of its main island Honshu.

The name Chūka minkoku was officially adopted by Japan in 1930, but Shina was still commonly used by the Japanese throughout the 1930s and 1940s.

== Post-war derogatory connotations ==
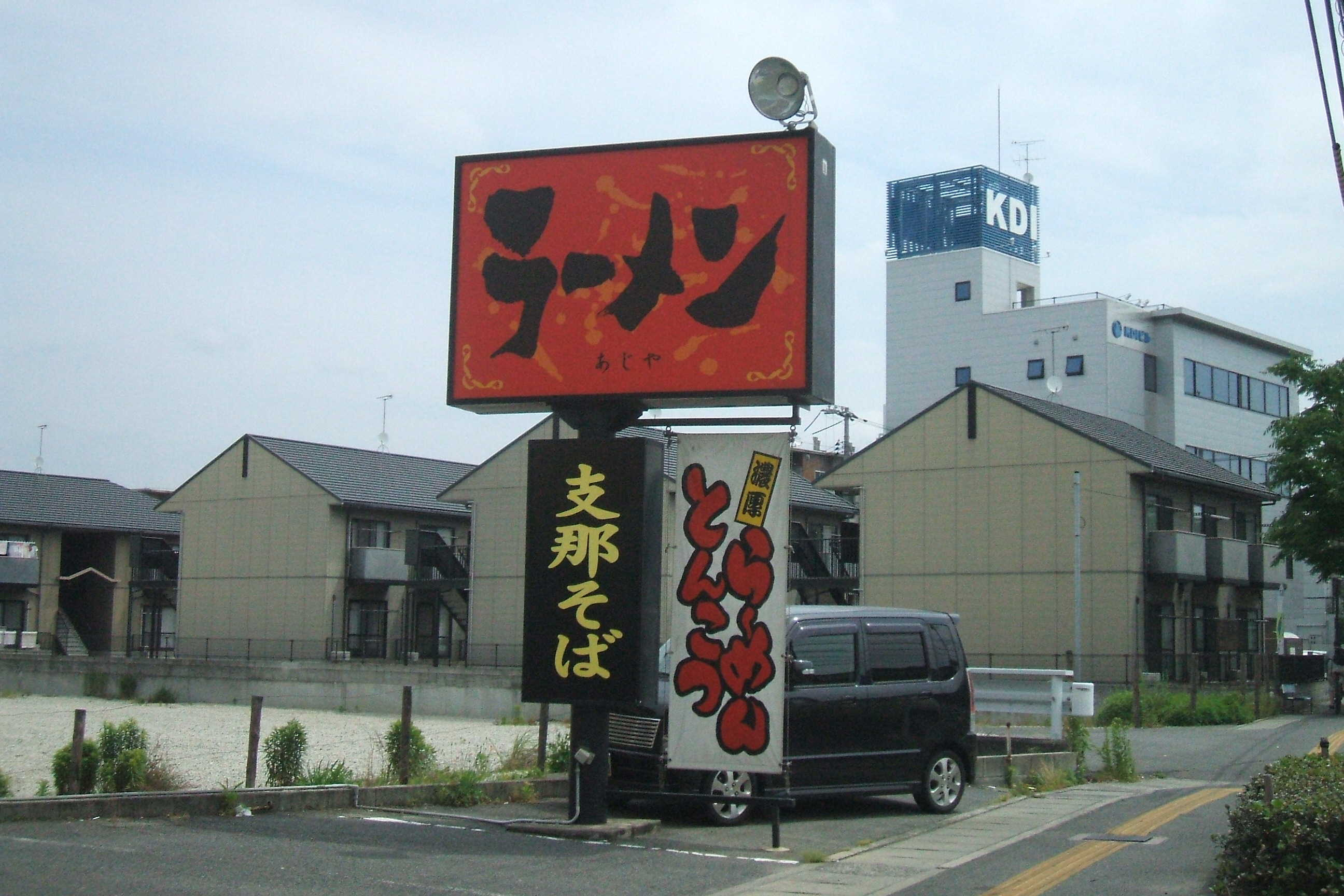
A ramen store in Japan selling "Shina soba"

The Second Sino-Japanese War fixed the impression of the term Shina as offensive among Chinese people. In 1946, the Republic of China demanded that Japan cease using Shina.

In China, the term Shina has become linked with the Japanese invasion and Japanese war crimes, and has been considered an offensive ethnic slur ever since.

In modern Japan, the term Chūka Minkoku (中華民国) refers to the Republic of China, while Chūka Jinmin Kyōwakoku (中華人民共和国) refers to the People's Republic of China; the terms use the same Chinese characters (with Japanese shinjitai simplifications) used officially in both the People's Republic of China and the Republic of China. Likewise, in most cases, words previously containing Shina have been altered; for example, the term for sinology was changed from Shinagaku (支那学; "Shina studies") to Chūgokugaku (中国学) or Chūkagaku (中華学; "Chinese studies"), and the name for the Second Sino-Japanese War has changed from terms such as Shina jihen (支那事變; "The China Incident") and Nisshi jihen (日支事變; "The Japan-Shina Incident") to Nitchū sensō (日中戦争; "Japan-China War").

Writing Shina in Japanese is considered socially unacceptable and subject to kotobagari, especially the kanji form; if Shina is used, it is now generally written in katakana (シナ) rather than with the kanji (支那), which in Japanese serves as a way to spell offensive words (cf. English "f*ck"). As such, the term has survived in a few non-political compound words in Japanese, and even (rarely) in Chinese. For example, the South and East China Seas are called Minami Shina Kai (南シナ海) and Higashi Shina Kai (東シナ海), respectively, in Japanese (prior to World War II, the names were written as 南支那海 and 東支那海). Shinachiku (支那竹 or simply シナチク), a ramen topping made from dried bamboo, also derives from the term Shina, but in recent years the word menma (メンマ) has replaced this as a more politically correct name. Some terms that translate to words containing the "Sino-" prefix in English retain Shina within them, for example シナ・チベット語族 (Sino-Tibetan languages) and シナントロプス・ペキネンシス (Sinanthropus pekinensis, also known as Peking Man). Meanwhile, one of the Chinese names for Indochina is yìndù zhīnà (印度支那).

Even so, it is still sometimes seen in written forms such as Shina soba (支那そば), an alternative name for ramen, a dish which originates from China. Many Japanese are not fully aware of Chinese feelings towards the term, and generally find Shina merely old-fashioned and associated with the early and mid-20th century, rather than derogatory and racist. This difference in conception can lead to misunderstandings. The term is a slur when used toward Ryukyuans by mainland Japanese people.

Sinologist Joshua A. Fogel mentioned that, "Surveying the present scene indicates much less sensitivity on the part of Chinese to the term Shina and growing ignorance of it in Japan". He also criticized Shintaro Ishihara, a right-wing nationalist politician who went out of his way to use the expression Shinajin (支那人) and called him a "troublemaker". He elaborated further:

Many terms have been offered as names for countries and ethnic groups that have simply not withstood the pressures of time and circumstance and have, accordingly, changed. Before the mid-1960s, virtually every well-meaning American, black or white and regardless of political affinity, referred to blacks as 'Negroes' with no intention of offense or slight. It was simply the respectful name in use; and it was superior to the openly reviled and offensive term "colored," still in legal use by people in the South (to say nothing of the highly offensive term in colloquial use by this group) ... By the late 1960s, few if any liberals were still using 'Negro' but had shifted to 'black,' because that was declared the ethnonym of choice by the group so named.

== Current usage ==
=== In Japan ===
Japanese Canadian historian Bob Tadashi Wakabayashi mentioned that there are two classes of postwar Japanese that have continued to use derogatory terms like Shina: poorly educated and/or elderly persons who grew up with the term go on using these from force of habit.

Some right-wing Japanese appeal to etymology in trying to ascribe respectability to the continued use of Shina, since the term Shina has non-pejorative etymological origins. Wakabayashi disagreed: "The term Jap also has non-pejorative etymological origins, since it derives from Zippangu (ジパング) in Marco Polo's Travels ... If the Chinese today say they are hurt by the terms Shina or Shinajin, then common courtesy enjoins the Japanese to stop using these terms, whatever the etymology or historical usage might be."

=== In Hong Kong ===
During the Japanese occupation of Hong Kong, the Japanese government classified Hong Kong residents as Shinajin (支那人), as the term was used to refer to all who were ethnically Chinese. Hongkongers that were considered useful to the Japanese government, as well as prominent local figures such as bankers and lawyers, were recorded in a census document called the "Hong Kong Shinajin Magnate Survey" (Japanese: 香港在住支那人有力者調查表, romanized: Honkon zaijū Shinajin yūryokusha chōsahyō). In 2016, a Hong Kong reporter was called Shinajin by Japanese nationalist politician Shintaro Ishihara.

In Hong Kong, the Cantonese pronunciation of Shina (Jyutping: zi1 na5, Yale: Jī-nàh; approximated in English-language sources as Cheena) is used in a derogative sense under the backdrop of ongoing tensions between Hong Kong and mainland China, even in official capacity, for example by Hong Kong localist politicians Yau Wai-ching and Sixtus Leung during their controversial oath swearing as elected members of the Hong Kong legislature.

On 15 September 2012, a Hong Kong online community organized a protest against mainlanders and parallel traders. During the protest, some demonstrators chanted "Cheena people get out!" On 24 September 2013, the Hong Kong political group Hongkongers Priority breached the front entrance of the Chinese People's Liberation Army Forces Hong Kong Building, the first such incident since the handover of Hong Kong. Billy Chiu, the leader of Hongkongers Priority, later announced on social media that Hongkongers Priority had successfully broken into the "Cheena Army Garrison". In October 2015, an HKGolden netizen remade the South Korean song "Gangnam Style", with lyrics calling mainland Chinese "locusts" and "Cheena people", titled "Disgusting Cheena Style" (Chinese: 核突支那Style).

Inside Hong Kong university campuses, mainland Chinese students were referred to as "Cheena dogs" and "yellow thugs" by local students. On 18 September 2019, the 88th anniversary of the Japanese invasion of northeast China, a celebration poster was put up on the Democracy Wall of the University of Hong Kong, glorifying the Japanese invasion while advocating for democracy in Hong Kong. Hong Kong journalist Audrey Li noted the xenophobic undertone of the widespread right-wing nativism movement, in which the immigrant population and tourists are used as scapegoats for social inequality and institutional failure.

In Hong Kong, some people consider hate speech and even discrimination toward mainland Chinese morally justified by a superiority complex influenced by Hong Kong's economic and cultural prominence during the Cold War, and nostalgia toward British rule. Some protesters choose to express their frustrations on ordinary mainlanders instead of the Chinese government. With rising tribalism and nationalism in Hong Kong and China, xenophobia between Hong Kongers and mainlanders is reinforced and reciprocated. Some critics of Hong Kong's pro-democracy movement argue that the prevalence of ethnic hatred and xenophobia amongst its supporters is mostly ignored by the media, which often frames the situation as simply a fight between democracy and authoritarianism.

== See also ==
- Names of China
- Chinaman
- Chink
- Chinky
- Locust
- Wokou
- Xiao Riben
- Ethnic issues in Japan
