= Association to Stop Racism Against Black People =

Japanese civil rights organization

The Association to Stop Racism Against Black People (Japanese: 黒人差別をなくす会) was a Japanese private organization founded in Japan in 1988. Based in Sakai, Osaka, the association was noted for causing publishers around Japan to suspend printing localized versions of the picture book The Story of Little Black Sambo.

== History ==
The organization was initially formed by a couple, Toshiji and Kimiko Arita, living in Sakai, Osaka, together with their nine year-old son, Hajime Arita, on August 11, 1988. Kimiko Arita was the association's chairman and Kimiko Arita the vice chairman. Hajime Arita was treasurer. Initially they were the only members of the association, but its membership increased to 135 by February 1992 and 225 by December 1995. There is no report of recent activity from the organization.

In July 1988, The Washington Post published a report titled "Old Black Stereotypes Find New Lives in Japan", which described the design of a Sambo and Hannah doll by Sanrio, as well as mannequins manufactured by Yamato Mannequin which were found in department stores, as discriminatory. Sanrio immediately ceased the doll's production and recalled all the dolls. However, after reading the report, the Arita family agreed with the position of the article that such an expression can be considered as discriminatory, and as a result they went to collect goods that depicted black people from shops and started investigating how they were being depicted.

The family of three was welcomed to the United States by an African American organization in August 1989. In the US, they met Jesse Jackson, a former president candidate, and Tom Bradley, the Los Angeles mayor at the time.

== Activity ==
Activities of the association mainly include sending opposition letters against characters, comic, animation, publishers and corporate, for expressions that were considered by the association to be discriminatory depictions of black people, and occasionally included other racial discrimination.

The association has launched complaints against works that have minimal appearances by black people. Some works are able to survive their complaints by refusal to comply with their request, but in some other cases, these complaints have caused authors to seal and suspend production of their works.

A total survey of publications with black people appearing have been conducted. In late 1990, the association have sent letters to all publishers, asking them to react accordingly before their given deadline. As a result, more than 300 volumes works have been ceased from publication for a period of time, including the likes of Kimba the White Lion, and the "Complete Collection of Osamu Tezuka Comics", which totaled 300 volumes at a time, was also affected. (Note: After approximately a year of publication suspension, it was resumed from March 1992 March with an additional "Letter to readers" attached to it.) The protest was noted in the "Message from the editor" section at the end of the Complete Collection of Osamu Tezuka Comics. In September 1993, they launched a protest and demanded for the recall of a Sanrio picture book which included an Ekai Uta song titled "Kawaii Cook-san" (lit. Lovely Mr. Cook). In June 1999, a protest against Animal Kingdom of Osamu Tezuka by Osamu Tezuka was launched, which resulted in tentative disturbance in release process before the protest being rejected.

In 2000, Iwanami Bunko's translation of On the Edge of the Primeval Forest by Albert Schiweitzer was demanded for shipment suspension because of allegedly discriminatory expressions against native population in Africa. The event was also reported in America, which gathered support from organizations against racial discrimination on black people.

In 2002, they again launched a complaint against Iwakuni Bunko for discriminatory expressions in Doctor Dolittle.

Results:

- As a result of their protest, publication of The Story of Little Black Sambo ceased for some time from December 1989.
- In 1989, Takara (now part of Tomy) stopped using their "Winky Dolls" trademark.
- Calpis changed their logo in January 1990, which previously featured a racist caricature of a black man.
- Showpieces in Osamu Tezuka Exhibition were replaced.
- In July 1990, the association protested Obake no Q-Tarō, which included a chapter titled "International Obake Union", where an obake with an image of black people was depicted. As a result, some volumes were recalled and ceased from publication. Jungle Kurobe was also recalled and ceased from publication at the same time, but whether such a committee was involved in the process is unknown.
- In August 1990, the association launched a protest against Dr. Slump by Akira Toriyama, Kochira Katsushika-ku Kameari Kōen-mae Hashutsujo by Osamu Akimoto, Scrap Sundayu by Yudetamago, The Burning Wild Man by Tadashi Satou, and Tsuide ni Tonchinkan by Koichi Endo, that resulted in a corresponding amendment in these works.
- In 1992, the GOMES magazine published by Parco was recalled.
- In December 1995, Anmitsu Hime by Izumi Takemoto was recalled.
- In September 1998, a souvenir doll that looks like black people from Okinawa was removed from sale and a children's park in Sapporo was renamed from Kuronbo Park to Ohisama Park.

== Responses ==
As a result of their activities, stereotypical depictions of black people in media have become a taboo, author, publishers and editors started to impose self-censorship onto their works.

Since their protests have caused publishers to stop printing some older words, they have drawn considerable amounts of criticism, as they have been seen as infringing on freedom of expression.

In the 1989 April volume of Buraku Liberate, the deputy chairman of the association wrote that "The picture book is just a piece of merchandise that discriminates against black people. No matter how well known the book is among the general public and no matter how valuable it is literature, that still does not constitute an excuse against the fact". However, in response to an interview by Nishinihon Shimbun, the deputy chairman tried to claim that they do not want to extinguish the picture book. However, when publishers have tried to discuss the incident with them, they have rejected calls to participate in such a discussion.

According to Masahisa Nadamoto of the Kyoto Institute for Buraku History (later professor at Kyoto Sangyo University), the Nagano branch of the Buraku Liberation League once protested to the Nagano City Board of Education that The Story of Little Black Sambo was racist and should not be placed in the library. The Board of Education, demoralised by this, notified kindergartens and homes in the city to destroy any The Story of Little Black Sambo books they had.

Publishers feared such protests. When the above-mentioned Obake no Q-Tarō was protested, Jungle Kurobe, which was not the target of the protests, was also out of print. (The main character, Kurobe, was from Africa.) These were not published again until after 2010. These effects lasted for a long period of time, and the inclusion of black people in Japanese manga and anime based on them was avoided.

== Accolades ==
According to the report from Buraku Liberate Volume November 1989, they were named "champions against discrimination".

== See also ==
- Racial discrimination
- Kotobagari (word hunting)
- Black Lives Matter protests in Japan
