= 2015 Yuen Long protest =

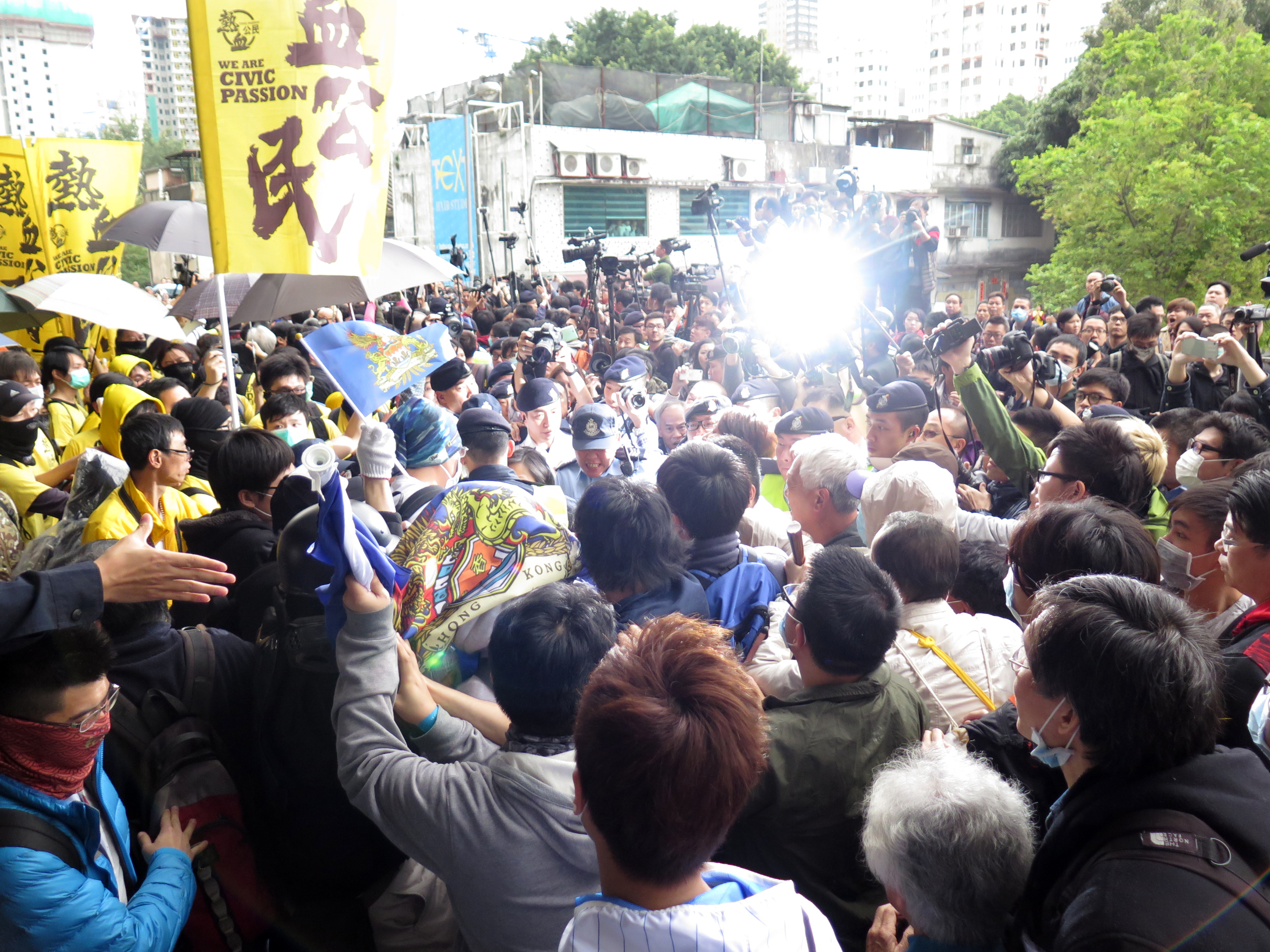
Clashes outside Long Ping station, Yuen Long

The 2015 Yuen Long protest, also known as Liberate Yuen Long or Recover Yuen Long (Chinese: 光復元朗) by the protesters, was part of a series of anti–parallel trading protests in North District, Hong Kong that took place on 1 March 2015 in Yuen Long. It was mainly organised by political parties Civic Passion, Hong Kong Indigenous and other grassroots groups. The protesters rallied against the practice of parallel trading; the act of buying goods at cheaper prices in Hong Kong, especially in Yuen Long, and selling them in mainland China for profit.

== Background ==
The main complaint of this protest was the act of parallel trading; where traders would commute from mainland China to Hong Kong, purchase large amounts of a given good, and resell them in China at higher prices for profit. The immediate effects of this result in long border queues for commuters, crowded public transport (from the border), product shortages, and localised price inflation. Due to their proximity to the mainland border, certain towns in the North District suffered these effects the most, namely Yuen Long. Most products involved in this practice were household consumables that were non-perishable, non-fragile, and sold in bulk; this included products such as milk powder, shampoo, and medicine.

Typically, mainland China and Hong Kong maintain a rigid border with full immigration and customs and excise checks. Mainland Chinese residents are required to obtain visas to enter Hong Kong (and vice versa). However, during the time of the protests a policy known as the 'multiple entry visa policy' allowed mainland Chinese residents to enter and exit Hong Kong freely for the duration of the visa. This enabled traders to easily enter Hong Kong and return to China, including multiple times within the same day. It is common practice for mainland Chinese residents to live in neighbouring areas such as the city of Shenzhen and commute to Hong Kong. Similarly Hong Kong residents often live in the northern district of Hong Kong and commute to China. It is common for Hong Kong residents to maintain family and business ties to mainland-China, and can vary in opinion from strong anti-China views to strong pro-China views. This dichotomy is especially prevalent in the Northern Districts, where business owners greatly benefit from parallel trading, whilst consumers suffer shortages and inflation.

Due to perceived shortages and inflation, residents responded with the a protest campaign named "Recover Sheung Shui" in 2012. Other similar campaigns in the northern towns of Tuen Mun, Sha Tin and Yuen Long soon followed for the same reasons. Public sentiment on this issue was worsened from perceived indifference and lack of response from the Hong Kong government.

== Protest ==
On 02 March 2015 at 4 pm, approximately 200 people gathered at Sau Fu Street (in Yuen Long) to protest the parallel trading. This protest was organised by political parties Civic Passion, and Hong Kong Indigenous. Protesters were outfitted in plastic builders helmets, plastic goggles, and masks for protection and anonymity. Hong Kong Police initially responded and attempted to disperse the crowd without force.

At 4:15 pm, protesters attempted to break past the police line and pushed against the pro-parallel trading elements on Sau Fu Street, causing police to respond with pepper spray (without prior warning). This resulted in a brawl between the protesters and pro-parallel trading elements.

At 4:30 pm, members of Civic Passion regrouped and demanded for the abolition of the multiple entry visa policy. The dispute between the pro and anti-parallel trading elements continued as the group moved to Tung Lok Street at 5:15 pm. At 6 pm, people gathered on the Yuen Long Main Road and blocked traffic. Protesters began to set up some obstacles to barricade the road, such as rubbish bins. From 7 to 8 pm, the anti-parallel trading groups marched from Yuen Long Main Road to Kau Yuk Road and attempted to occupy the area. Several protesters stayed in the area until 10:30 pm.

The police used pepper spray 21 times to control the situation. In the wake of the protest, the police arrested 36 men and 2 women, ages ranging from 13 to 74. They were arrested on charges of common assault, assaulting police and possession of weapons. Five police officers were injured and had to receive treatment in hospital.

A reporter and cameraman from news station ATV were hit by pepper spray. Yuen Long police superintendent Matthew Lau Mei-Yam denied it being intentional saying "I believe it was an accident". He continued condemning the protesters saying they "quarrelled, threw objects, and rushed to the road."

Several shops were forced to temporarily close their businesses due to the protest. Managers closed their shops to ensure their safety which affected normal operation. Roughly 30 shops had been forced to close. Members of the Hong Kong General Chamber of Commerce threatened to sue over their losses.

== Aftermath ==
=== Hong Kong government ===
Hong Kong Secretary for Security Lai Tung-kwok, said "the public could express their views within the confines of the law. Police definitely would not tolerate illegal behaviour, and would enforce the law." He also added that Hong Kong authorities would continue to combat related offences.

Hong Kong Secretary for Commerce and Economic Development Gregory So Kam-leung, emphasised that the Individual Visit Scheme is important to Hong Kong, and that the Hong Kong government could not change the policy. He also added that proposals to cancel the multiple-entry permit scheme would be a substantial adjustment, and that government needed to consider it carefully. He also added that the Hong Kong public should not confuse parallel traders with mainland visitors.

The government later announced that it had sent a proposal to the Beijing authority to regulate the "multiple-entry permit" plan. Since the protests, the conflicts between Hong Kongers and mainlanders have intensified resulting in parallel traders stopped practice and decreasing the frequency of travel to Hong Kong.

=== Mainland Chinese media ===
The Xinhua News Agency reported on the Liberate Yuen Long Protests. It reported that the Hong Kong radical groups that launched the Liberate Yuen Long Campaign would bring nuisances to merchants in Yuen Long. It also reported that Hong Kong residents and local community organisations expressed great indignation towards the protesters, and urged the police to enforce the law more firmly.

=== Local North District residents ===
Before the demonstration, the chairperson of Shap Pat Heung Rural Committee threatened that villagers had been overwhelmed and would surround anti-trading protesters when they step out of Long Ping station. And that they could not take any action if their villagers would behave violently (against the protesters).

Local residents were split by the practice of parallel trading. Some of the Yuen Long residents were dissatisfied with the parallel traders. A local opined that parallel traders caused road congestion which brought about traffic problems, and resulted in an increasing number of pharmacies and gold shops aimed at parallel traders replacing shops for locals; he hoped that the multiple-entry permits would be revoked. Other local residents did not agree with the campaign and believed the protesters were "stirring up trouble".

=== Protesters ===
On 8 March, some Internet users organised another fourth "liberate" protest. The complaints of this protest were similar to the previous demonstrations. At 4 pm, protesters responded to the exhortation from organizers and went to Tuen Mun. They demonstrated by shouting slogans loudly in different shopping malls. Some people caused chaos and collided with parallel traders near a B3X bus stop. The protest continued into the night, with approximately 30 protesters going to the Hong Kong Clock Tower to continue the demonstration. In the end, they were stopped by police and dismissed. The police arrested 7 people in total, aged 13 to 21.

== See also ==
- 2013-14 Occupy Central Protests, an anti-government protest in Hong Kong
- 2019–20 Hong Kong protests § Reclaim Yuen Long, another protest held in Yuen Long
