= Personal shopper =

Person who helps others shop

A personal shopper is a person who helps others shop by giving advice and making suggestions. They are often employed by department stores and boutiques, although some are freelance or work exclusively online. Their focus is usually on clothes, although the number of non-clothing stores – such as furniture retailers – that offer personal shopping services is on the rise.

There are no formal educational requirements to become a personal shopper, though most outlets recommend related retail experience.

A personal shopper is typically employed by the store itself, and payment by customers for the service is not required. Other stores will charge a small fee to use their personal shoppers and the amenities that come along with the service. Personal shoppers can also be known as fashion stylists, shop assistants, or sales assistants.

Some personal shoppers operate without affiliation on a freelance basis, including private client event styling and closet organizing. Outside of agencies, personal shoppers can be found on auction websites such as eBay where they auction their services to obtain customized items such as men and women's clothing collections.

== App-based personal shopping ==
The growth of online food ordering and delivery service apps has expanded personal shopping into gig work, particularly for groceries and other retail goods. App-based personal shoppers generally receive customer orders through a mobile app, select the requested items in stores, communicate with customers about substitutions, and deliver the completed orders.

- Instacart
- DoorDash
- Shipt
- Walmart Spark

== See also ==
- Buying agent – Offer to buy things on behalf of another
- Daigou – Purchases of goods for Chinese consumers made overseas
- Personal stylist – Person who selects or recommends clothing and accessories for a client
