= Daigou =

Purchases of goods for Chinese consumers made overseas

Daigou smuggler
Occupation
- Names: Daigou, "overseas personal shopper", "professional shopper"
- Synonyms: Haiwai daigou
- Occupation type: Profession

Description
- Fields of employment: Self-employed

Daigou (Chinese: 代购; pinyin: dàigòu; lit. 'surrogate shopping') is an emerging form of cross-border trade in which an individual or a syndicated group of exporters outside China purchases commodities (mainly luxury goods but sometimes also groceries such as infant formulas) for customers in China.

Daigou shoppers typically purchase the desired goods in a region outside China and then ship the goods to China or carry them in their luggage upon their return to China. The goods are then resold for profit in China.

Daigou activities can be conducted either illegally or legally, often using loopholes to circumvent import tariffs imposed on overseas goods.

== Sales ==
Daigou sales across sectors total $15 billion annually. In 2014, the value of the daigou business just in luxury goods increased from CN¥55 billion to CN¥75 billion yuan (US$8.8 billion to $12 billion).

Daigou purchases are often made in luxury brand boutiques in major fashion cities like Paris, London, New York City, Hong Kong, Tokyo and Seoul. Some daigou operators use Weibo and WeChat to communicate with their clients.

The large demand for daigou service is because of the perceived high import tariffs on luxury goods and concerns over unsafe products, especially food safety problems, Daigou shoppers can provide assurance that the products that are ordered by consumers in China are genuine and safe to use. Shoppers often have personal connections with the people in China who order from them.

A 2015 survey of Chinese online luxury shoppers found that 35% have used daigou to purchase luxury goods online, and only 7% used the website of the brand that they are or think that they are buying. Approximately 80% of Chinese luxury purchases are made abroad.

== Negative impacts ==
Daigou syndicates can be involved in hoarding and stockpiling of goods in large quantities and often infuriate local customers for the shortage of goods and disruption incurred to the markets.

In June 2019, naval personnel from a Chinese warship berthed in Sydney Harbour, Australia, were photographed unloading boxes of baby formula and other products from a large van to carry onto the ship.

In January and February 2020, in response to the COVID-19 pandemic, China's United Front organized successful daigou in numerous countries to help China import 2.5 billion pieces of epidemic safety equipment, including over two billion safety masks. The Australian subsidiaries of Country Garden and Greenland Holdings had their employees gather medical supplies, which were subsequently airlifted to Wuhan and exacerbated the shortages in Australian hospitals. Jorge Guajardo, Mexico's former ambassador to China, suggested that China was evidently hiding the extent of a pandemic that endangered the world and covertly securing PPE at low prices, as the "surreptitious" operation left "the world naked with no supply of PPE."

As daigou purchases are often conducted in cash and without proper documentation they have been linked to money laundering, with alleged criminal proceeds are channelled through purchases at luxury stores.

Such actions have prompted several governments to take actions against daigou smuggling and hoarding. In 2012, the New Zealand government began regularly cracking down and sometimes outright banning unauthorized export of consumer goods through unregistered channels. Australian retailers have imposed multiple restrictions on daigou purchases of baby formula.

Some daigou service providers fraudulently sell counterfeit products that have been altered to appear purchased abroad from legitimate sources.

In summer 2026, South Korea’s Incheon Airport airline staff suffered at least five incidents involving “daigou” traders rushing past queues, resulting in injured airport staff.

== Responses from China ==
On January 1, 2019, China officially rolled out a new e-commerce law, the first of its kind that directly regulates daigou activities. Under the new law, all daigou participants are legally required to register as e-commerce operators and acquire licenses in both China and the country where they shop, making their business subject to taxation in both China and the region in which they purchased goods. Any e-commerce platform or seller could be fined 2 million yuan or 500,000 yuan, respectively, and possibly face criminal charges, if they are found guilty of smuggling, tax evasion or willful violation of the new e-commerce law.

== See also ==
- Parallel trading in Hong Kong
