= Nanjing anti-African protests =

1988–1989 student protests in Nanjing, China

- Part of Racism in China; Protest and dissent in China
- Location: Nanjing, Shanghai, Beijing

The Nanjing anti-African protests were mass demonstrations and riots against African students in Nanjing, China, which lasted from December 1988 to the following January.

== Protests ==
On 24 December 1988, two male African students were entering their campus at Hohai University in Nanjing with two Chinese women. The occasion was a Christmas Eve party. A quarrel between one of the Africans and a Chinese security guard, who had suspected that the women the African students tried to bring into the campus were prostitutes and refused their entry, led to a brawl between all the African and Chinese students on the campus which lasted till the morning, leaving 13 students injured. The brawl included other African students besides the two stopped by the security guards.

300 Chinese students, spurred by false rumors that a Chinese man had been killed by the Africans, broke into and set about destroying the Africans' dormitories, shouting slogans. Part of the destruction involved setting fire to the Africans' dormitory and locking them in. The President of the university had to order the fire department to take action.

After the police had dispersed the Chinese students, many Africans fled to the railway station in order to gain safety at various African embassies in Beijing. The authorities prevented the Africans from boarding the trains so as to question those involved in the brawl. Soon their numbers increased to 140, as other African and non-African foreign students, fearing violence or simply by sympathy, arrived at the first-class waiting room at the station asking to be allowed to go to Beijing.

By this time, Chinese students from Hohai University had joined up with students from other Nanjing universities to make up a 3,000-strong demonstration that called on government officials to prosecute the African students and reform the system which gave foreign students more rights than Chinese students. On the evening of 26 December, the marchers converged on the railway station while holding banners calling for human rights and political reform. Chinese police managed to isolate the non-Chinese students from the marchers and moved them by force to a military guest house in Yizheng outside Nanjing. The protests were declared illegal, and riot police were brought in from surrounding provinces to pacify the demonstrators, which took several more days.

The African students and their sympathizers were removed from Yizheng to another military guesthouse closer to Nanjing on New Year's Eve, and were returned to their universities the following day.

== Aftermath ==
In January, three of the African students were deported for starting the brawl. An African student claimed he received an electric shock to the genitals. The other students returned to Hohai University and were required to follow new regulations, including a night-time curfew, having to report to university authorities before leaving the campus. Guests were still required to be registered.

Anti-African demonstrations spread to other cities, including Shanghai and Beijing.

== Tiananmen Square protests ==
The Nanjing protests were groundbreaking dissidence for China and went from solely expressing concern about alleged improprieties by African men to increasingly calling for democracy or human rights. They were paralleled by burgeoning demonstrations in other cities during the period between the Nanjing and the 1989 Tiananmen Square protests and massacre, with some elements of the original protests that started in Nanjing still evident in 1989 Tiananmen Square protests, such as banners proclaiming "Stop Taking Advantage of Chinese Women" even though the vast majority of African students had left the country by that point.

== See also ==
- Racism in China
- Africans in Guangzhou
