= Multiracial people in China =

混血兒 / 混血儿

Languages
- Chinese

Related ethnic groups
- Mixed race

Multiracial people in China
- Traditional Chinese: 混血兒
- Simplified Chinese: 混血儿
- Literal meaning: mixed-blood child(ren)
Transcriptions
Standard Mandarin
- Hanyu Pinyin: hùnxuè'ér hùnxuě'é hùnxiě'ér
- Wade–Giles: hun-hsüeh-êrh

Multiracial people in the People's Republic of China are those considered to belong to more than one race or whose parents are considered to belong to different races. In a Chinese context, this generally involves one parent belonging to the Han majority and the other belonging to one of the nation's minority groups. In foreign coverage, discussion generally focuses on the children of a Chinese citizen and a foreigner.

== History ==
For decades following the Chinese Communist Revolution, marriages between laowai (non-East Asian foreigners) and Chinese were unusual and perhaps even nonexistent during the Cultural Revolution, but they were never explicitly banned or judged unacceptable on a racial basis. It was only in the mid-1970s that the first petitions for permission to marry foreigners were accepted, with the thawing of diplomatic ties between China and the United States. Such marriages remained relatively unusual for another two decades.

From 1994 to 2008, each year has seen about 3,000 more mixed race marriages in Shanghai than the previous year. This has caused a major shift in China's attitudes to race and to Chinese children of mixed race heritage, because of globalization.

== Notable people ==
- He Luli
- Maj. Art Chin (Sino-Japanese War/WWII veteran combat aviator for the Chinese Air Force)
- Ding Hui
- Nancy Kwan
- Bruce Lee
- Lin Hu
- Lou Jing
- Karen Mok
- Anthony Wong
- Celina Jade
- Michelle Reis
- Central Cee
- Chloe Bennet
- Alysa Liu
- Eileen Gu

== See also ==
- Racism in China
- Indo people
- Eurasian Singaporeans
