= Kotobagari =

Japanese term for euphemistic speech

Kotobagari (言葉狩り; "word hunting") is a sardonic term which refers to the reluctance to use words that are considered potentially offensive or politically incorrect in the Japanese language. For instance words such as rai (癩; "leper" (Note: See Leprosy in Japan)), mekura (盲; "blind"), tsunbo (聾; "deaf"), oshi (唖; "deaf-mute"), kichigai (気違い or 気狂い, "crazy"), tosatsujō (屠殺場; "slaughterhouse"), and hakuchi (白痴; "moron/retard") are currently not used by the majority of Japanese publishing houses; the publishers often refuse to publish writing which includes these words.

Another example is that a school janitor in Japan used to be called a kozukai-san (小使いさん; "chore person"). Some felt that the word had a derogatory meaning, so it was changed to yōmuin (用務員; "task person"). Now yōmuin is considered demeaning, so there is a shift to use kōmuin (校務員; "school task member") or kanrisagyōin (管理作業員; "maintenance member") instead. This pattern of change is an example of the linguistic phenomenon known as the "euphemism treadmill".

Other examples of words which have become unacceptable include the replacement of the word hyakushō (百姓) for "farmer" with nōka (農家).

Since World War II, the word Shina (支那) for China written in kanji has been recognized as derogatory, and has been largely superseded by the Japanese pronunciation of the endonym, Chūgoku (中国), or with Shina written in katakana (シナ).

In the 1960s, the Sino-Japanese word Mōko (蒙古) meaning "Mongol" was recognized for its connotation of a "stupid, ignorant, or immature" person (compare the English term "Mongoloid"), and the ethnic group is now referred to by the katakana term Mongoru (モンゴル).

== Kotobagari and ideology ==
Kotobagari has led to some confusing terminology.

NHK, the Japanese Broadcasting Company, runs a Korean language study program, but the language is referred to as "Hangul". This is a result of both the North and South Korean governments demanding that the language be called by their respective preferred name of Korea suffixed with "language" (語). North Korea wanted the show to be called Chōsen-go or "Chōsen language" (朝鮮語), taken from the Japanese pronunciation of the full name of North Korea, Chōsen Minshu Shugi Jinmin Kyōwakoku (朝鮮民主主義人民共和国) or "Democratic People's Republic of Korea". South Korea wanted Kankoku-go or "Kankoku language" (韓国語) from Daikan Minkoku (大韓民国) or "Republic of Korea".

As a compromise, "Hangul" was selected and Korean is referred to as "the language on this program" or "this language", but this has led to the use of the neologism "Hangul language" (ハングル語) to refer to the Korean language, which is technically incorrect since hangul itself is a writing system, not a language.
