= Local effects of the 2020 Hong Kong national security law =

The enactment of the Hong Kong national security law on 30 June 2020 has since caused huge changes in Hong Kong's local education, government, culture, society, and economy. These effects are considered to be the result of the Hong Kong government’s continuing autocratization.

== Governmental ==
On 1 July, the Committee for Safeguarding National Security of the Hong Kong Special Administrative Region was established by the Hong Kong government.

On 8 July, the Civil Service Bureau submitted a proposal that would require all civil servants, employed from July 1, to pledge allegiance to the city and the Basic Law, in alignment with the national security law.

=== Elections ===
Secretary for Constitutional and Mainland Affairs Erick Tsang stated in an interview with Oriental Daily News that organizers of the primaries for the 2020 Hong Kong legislative election by the pro-democracy camp and the candidates may breach the newly Beijing-enacted National Security Law articles 20, 22, and 29. On Friday 10 July, before the primaries on the weekends, police raided the office of co-organisers Public Opinion Research Institute (PORI), taking away computers and accusing the organisation of dishonest use of a computer. PORI director Robert Chung said that the primaries will still be held, and computers related to the primaries were not taken away.

== Law enforcement ==
In a statement, the Hong Kong Police Force said that they would consider illegal any flag or banner raised by protesters deemed to be promoting Hong Kong's separation from China, along with Tibetan, Xinjiang and Taiwan independence. The police was granted new powers, including the ability to conduct searches for evidence without a warrant in "exceptional circumstances", to restrict persons suspected of violating the national security law from leaving Hong Kong, and to take down electronic messages published that are "likely to constitute an offence endangering national security or is likely to cause the occurrence of an offence endangering national security".

On 1 July, the police used a new banner to warn protesters against "displaying flags or banners/chanting slogans/or conducting yourselves with an intent such as secession or subversion, which may constitute offenses” under the new law, and that they “may be arrested and prosecuted.” On 2 July, the Hong Kong government issued a statement declaring the slogan "Liberate Hong Kong, revolution of our times" as having separatist and subversive connotations, and that it may seek to prosecute those displaying or chanting the slogan under the new law.

The Office for Safeguarding National Security of the CPG in the HKSAR was established as a state security agency on 1 July. The Office, together with its employees' living quarters, is located in the Metropark Hotel Causeway Bay Hong Kong building. Separately, the Department for Safeguarding National Security, under the Police Force, was established on the same day.

=== Arrests and charges ===
The first arrest under the national security law was made on 1 July, less than 15 hours after the text for the law was published. A man was arrested for allegedly holding a Hong Kong independence flag in Causeway Bay. On the same day, nine others were arrested on suspicion of violating the national security law. They included people who were calling for independence, or possessing items advocating independence.

On 3 July, a man arrested on 1 July who allegedly drove a motorbike into a group of three police officers while flying a “Liberate Hong Kong” banner was charged with one count of inciting secession and another of terrorism. He became the first person to be formally charged under the new law. His case was also the first case involving the National Security Law to reach trial.

On 6 July, 2 more were arrested under the national security law during a protest where protesters held out blank papers. A person, calling the police "dirty cops", was warned that they were in violation of the new law.

=== Political exiles since the enactment ===
==== Nathan Law ====
On 2 July 2020, Nathan Law posted on his social media page that he has left Hong Kong. Later it was known that Law settled in the United Kingdom.

==== Ted Hui ====
On 3 December 2020, Ted Hui, while in Denmark, announced that he would not return to Hong Kong.

== Cultural ==
On 4 July, it was discovered that at least nine books authored or co-authored by pro-democratic figures, including Joshua Wong and Tanya Chan, have been removed from public libraries. The Leisure and Cultural Services Department, responsible for running the libraries, said in a statement that the libraries "will review whether certain books violate the stipulations of the National Security Law," and that "while legal advice will be sought in the process of the review, the books will not be available for borrowing and reference in libraries." Before the law was enacted, exhibitors of the 2020 Hong Kong Book Fair, to be opened on 15 July, were urged by the Hong Kong Trade Development Council, the organiser, to exercise “self-discipline” and avoid selling “unlawful” books. After the law was enacted and books removed from libraries, some exhibitors have stated that they will not sell the books that are being reviewed by the Leisure and Cultural Services Department.

Local magazine Breakazine stopped the publication of its July issue, as the publisher seeks legal opinion on whether the latest issue would be in violation of the new law. Political commentator Koo Tak Ming ended his regular contributions to Apple Daily in response to the new law.

== Education ==
On 3 July, Hong Kong Education Bureau sent a late night notice to all schools in Hong Kong demanding that the newly enacted national security legislation will be taught and enforced in all public and private schools, including special education schools, in every single grade level starting in Kindergarten. The Bureau will support developing curriculum and assessment, the notice stated, and requests all stake holders – educators, administrators, social workers – work together to "enhance national identity". On 6 July, the Education Bureau has ordered schools to review and remove items from their curriculum and libraries that violate the newly enacted national security law, unless these books are to "positively teach" students. Critics of the national security law have long seen the national security law as a tool to silence dissent. The Education Bureau further reaffirmed to Reuters that because schools are the "gatekeepers" for their teaching resources, therefore school management and teachers should review "all teaching materials, including books" that may violate the national security law.

On 8 July, Education Bureau minister Kevin Yeung stated in a written response that pro-democracy protest-related activities such as forming human chains or chanting songs, specifically the protest anthem "Glory to Hong Kong", are banned in all schools. Whereas Article 27 of Hong Kong Basic Law guarantees citizens' freedom of speech, of "assembly, of procession and of demonstration", Yeung concluded that children's right to free expression "is not absolute" and requested that schools take action to prevent such "violations" from occurring.

== Technological ==
In response to the law, Facebook, Google, Twitter, WhatsApp and Telegram temporarily paused the processing of government requests for user data in Hong Kong, while video-sharing platform TikTok, owned by Beijing-based ByteDance, announced its discontinuation of Hong Kong operations.

== See also ==
- Timeline of reactions to the Hong Kong national security law
  - October, November, December 2020
  - January, February, March, April, May, June, July, August, September–November 2021
