= Locust (ethnic slur) =

Ethnic slur for mainland Chinese people

Locust (Chinese: 蝗蟲; Jyutping: wong4 cung4) is an ethnic slur against the mainland Chinese people in Hong Kong. The derogatory remark is frequently used in protests, social media, and localist publications in Hong Kong, especially when the topics involve the influx of mainland Chinese tourists, immigrants, parallel traders, and the pro-democracy movement.

== Origin ==
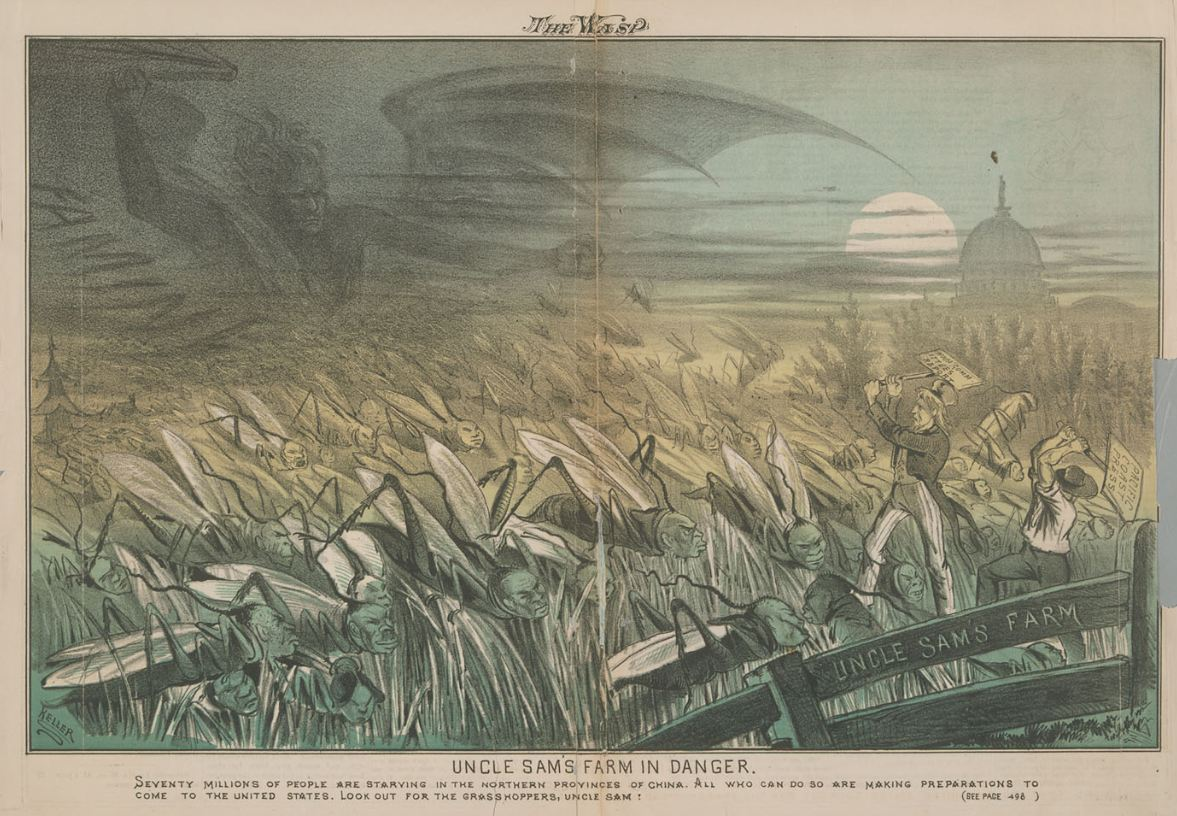
1878 political cartoon depicting Chinese Americans as locusts

In 1901, the English merchant Archibald John Little recorded the French Catholic priest Armand David comparing Chinese people to locusts. In his book, Mount Omi and beyond: A record of travel on the Tibetan border, Little quoted David's anti-Chinese sentiments:

...on this locust-like propensity of the Chinese to destroy every green thing wherever they penetrate, for when the trees are gone comes the turn of the scrub and bushes, then the grass, and at last the roots, until, finally, the rain washes down the accumulated soil of ages, and only barren rocks remain...

== In Hong Kong ==
In Hong Kong, "wong chung", the Cantonese word for locust, is used in a derogatory sense against mainland Chinese under the backdrop of ongoing tensions between Hongkongers and mainland China.

Chinese people are called wong chung, locust in Cantonese, by local residents. The usage of the word began in Hong Kong local blogs and message boards such as HKGolden. Popular songs with lyrics modified, containing derogatory slurs such as "locusts" and "Cheena" directed toward mainland Chinese people, were regularly produced and shared between online communities. Mainland Chinese working and studying in Hong Kong regularly experience discrimination, regardless of their level of assimilation. Hong Kong surveys indicated mainland Chinese speaking Cantonese were mocked due to their accents, denied work opportunities, and they suffered mental health issues.

The term locust became prominent in 2012, when some local residents paid full-page advertisement, depicting mainland Chinese as locusts on local tabloid-newspaper Apple Daily HK. The ethnic slur then gained widespread usage in subsequent protests against mainland Chinese immigrants, tourists, birth tourists, and parallel traders, where residences would chant and sing songs targeting mainland Chinese people. Localist demonstrators organized "anti-locust protest", shouting slurs at mainland shoppers. These provocative words sometimes lead to physical conflicts between the protesters and pedestrians.

In Hong Kong, some people may consider the usage and discrimination toward mainland Chinese morally justified due to Hong Kong's colonial history, cultural differences, and nostalgia toward British rule. Some protesters choose to express their frustrations on ordinary mainlanders instead of the Chinese government. Due to the rising tribalism and nationalism in Hong Kong and China, the ethnic racism between Hong Kongers and mainlanders is reinforced and reciprocated.

San Francisco-based writer Ling Woo Liu argued that the usage of ethnic slur alienated mainland Chinese people who are sympathetic toward Hong Kong's cause. Chinese media Southern Weekly believed the grievance of Hong Kong people is generated by the economic stagnation, crowded living space, inadequate public services in recent years. The article stated that Hongkonger's anger is misdirected as mainlanders are used as the sole scapegoat by localist movements.

== See also ==
- Shina (word)
- Yellow Peril
- 2012 Kong Qingdong incident
