= 2012 Kong Qingdong incident =

Controversy and protests in Hong Kong

In January 2012, Peking University professor Kong Qingdong made televised remarks suggesting that many Hongkongers were disloyal to China and still harboured a colonial mentality. Kong Qingdong said many Hongkongers were "dogs" in response to an online video posted about a mainland Chinese child eating on the subway, which is prohibited by MTR regulations, and being harassed despite having stopped eating subsequently. This prompted a series of campaigns against Kong Qingdong in Hong Kong. About 150 people gathered at the Central Government's Liaison Office on 22 January to protest Kong's remarks.

The protests took place among a backdrop of increasing tensions between native citizens of Hong Kong and mainlanders, including the release of a survey indicating that Hongkongers feel increasingly separate from Mainland Chinese people. At the time of the protests, anti-Mainland Chinese sentiment in Hong Kong had been growing because of the large influx of mainland Chinese mothers arriving in Hong Kong to give birth, largely for their children to receive right of abode in Hong Kong and the social services that came with it.

== Background ==
=== Cultural identity ===
Since 1997, University of Hong Kong professor Robert Chung (Chinese: 鐘庭耀) had been regularly conducting surveys on how residents in Hong Kong view their own identity. Of particular significance was the comparison between Hong Kong residents who preferred to be identified primarily as "Hong Kong people" as opposed to "Chinese", largely as a result of many Hongkongers harbouring cultural and political values that were seen as distinct from those of China at large.

In December 2011, Chung's poll showed that 63% of the people considered themselves "Hong Kongers" first, and only 34% thought of the same way of being "Chinese" first. This is the highest ratio of those who consider themselves primarily as "Hong Kong people" (Chinese: 香港人) since the transfer of sovereignty to China in 1997. After Chung published his results, two pro-Beijing newspapers in Hong Kong, Wen Wei Po and Ta Kung Pao alleged that Chung was a "political fraudster" with "evil intentions" to incite people to deny they are Chinese. One pro-Beijing columnist asked whether Chung's actions were subversive, and whether his scholarship was the result of political bribery. Chung rejected the charges of bias and released a statement that the "Cultural Revolution-style curses and defamations are not conducive to the building of Chinese national identity among Hong Kong people".

Professor Dixon Sing (Chinese: 成名) of Hong Kong University of Science and Technology was also targeted by pro-Beijing media. In December 2011 newspapers alleged that he was an anti-China "Western-trained vicious dog" because he gave interviews to Falun Gong media. But the real issue, some suspect, may have his support for the 2010 "Five Constituencies Referendum," a set of by-elections deliberately triggered by pan-democrat politicians intended to showcase the Hong Kong public's endorsement of democratic reforms in the territory. The Students' union have since come out to protect professor Sing in a public statement about the "one country, two systems" policy being violated. They believed that regardless of pro-establishment or pro-democratic views, the views need to be respected in order for academic freedom to exist.

=== Influx of birth tourism ===
On 1 January 2012 a protest was held by more than 1,500 pregnant women and mothers with strollers against the number of mainland Chinese mothers giving birth in the Hong Kong. In 2001, the Court of Final Appeal ruled in Director of Immigration v. Chong Fung Yuen that Hong Kong-born children of mainland Chinese residents were entitled to the right of abode in Hong Kong even if their parents had entered the territory as tourists. This ruling led to a sharp rise in the number of mainland Chinese mothers coming to Hong Kong to give birth. In 2011, nearly half of all babies born in Hong Kong (38,043 out of 80,131) were born to mainland Chinese mothers. Hong Kong has one of the world's lowest birth rates, so the wave of outsiders' giving birth in Hong Kong hospitals put a significant strain on health care resources in the territory. Nurses in the region have accused the territory's government of incompetence, and lobbied for Hong Kong residents to be prioritised over non-locals. In 2012, the Hong Kong government reduced the quota for the number of mainland Chinese women allowed to give birth in public hospitals. The quota call was made after doctors themselves made a rare public call to pressure the government to put a stop on the number of babies allowed as resources were stretched too thin. The cap is now set at 3,400 for public and 31,000 for private hospitals.

Chief Executive Donald Tsang announced a four-point plan to hold back the wave of mainland Chinese 'birth tourists.' Heavy charges were imposed on non-locals who turn up at emergency stops to give birth immediately. The Immigration Department was allotted more resources at border checks to stop suspected mothers looking to give birth in the territory before they cross the border. Local authorities were also asked to crack down on people who assist women who enter the territory for the purpose of giving birth. More raids were to be conducted on unlicensed hotels serving pregnant women. About HK$6.6 million (~US$850,000) of public hospitals' bad debt in 2010–11 was from non-local mothers not paying their bills.

=== Property investment ===
Many Hongkongers blame wealthy mainland Chinese for driving property prices beyond the reach of local citizens. In 2011 Mainland Chinese purchased a third of all residential flats in Hong Kong, according to Nomura research. Home prices also rose as much as 70% since 2009.

== Incident ==
=== "Child eating on subway" controversy ===
In January 2012, Ken Wai, a Hong Kong passenger, asked a mainland Chinese woman and her child to stop eating on an MTR subway in Mandarin Chinese on a train bound for Mong Kok East station. Eating and drinking is prohibited on the MTR. While the kid stopped eating, the mother reacted with hostility towards Wai. This infuriated Mr. Wai, who began to shout at them passionately in Cantonese. The mother of the child argued back in Mandarin. The subway staff was forced to stop the train, and ask both parties to disembark from the train to resolve their dispute. Videos of the dispute were recorded, then uploaded to online video-sharing websites such as YouTube, quickly going viral. On 18 January Mr. Wai conducted an interview with Xinhua News Agency on the issue and expressed his anger.

==== Kong Qingdong's remarks ====
The incident was seen as the result of wider on-going social tensions between Hong Kong people and mainlanders at the time. It garnered a wide range of responses, of which the most notable came from Kong Qingdong, a professor at Peking University known for his vulgar commentary of political and social issues as well as his firebrand Chinese nationalism. Commenting on video-sharing website v1.cn, Kong remarked, "You Hong Kong'ers are Chinese, right? But as far as I can tell, many Hong Kong people don't think that they are Chinese. They claim that 'we' are Hongkongers, 'you' are Chinese. They are bastards. Those kinds of people used to be running dogs for the British colonialists. And until now, you Hong Kong'ers are still dogs, not human. I know many Hong Kongers are good people, but some are still dogs." Kong then claimed that Hong Kong residents had failed to accept their responsibility to speak Standard Mandarin because of the "residues of colonialism". He then threatened "If Hong Kong people continue to discriminate against Mainlanders in that way, then we won't provide the territory with water, vegetables, fruit and rice [...] Can you Hong Kong'ers still survive? Go to seek help from your British daddy."

Kong's remarks were widely publicized and quickly courted controversy; responding to criticism of his remarks, Kong Qingdong claimed that he made the remarks for Hong Kong people's benefit, and that he only called "some" Hong Kong people dogs. According to Ming Pao, Kong claimed that "normal people, educated people should all understand what [he] meant", and that "there are 'dogs' everywhere. Some Beijing people are dogs. If someone really says that all Hong Kong people are dogs, then I agree, that person should apologize. Since the only party claiming that Hong Kong people are dogs is Southern Daily. (Note: Kong had, by the time of the incident, a long-running feud with the Southern Media Group, which answered to the Communist propaganda department under the relatively liberal provincial party chief Wang Yang.) I demand that they apologize to both the Hong Kong people and me!"

== Protests ==
Many Hong Kong citizens were infuriated by Kong's remarks. Petitions for expelling Kong from Peking University, which was previously called for when he rejected an interview with the liberal Chinese newspaper Southern Weekly with a slew of profanities, was also renewed.

On 22 January 2012, about 150 protesters gathered at the Central Government's Liaison Office to protest against Kong Qingdong's statement. People brought their pet dogs and carried signs saying "We are not dogs". Some protesters claimed that Hong Kongers dislike the Communist Party precisely because the Party had, in their views, deformed 'true' Chinese culture and tradition.

== Reaction ==
=== Kong Qingdong ===
Kong criticised the protest as "an attempt to suppress (his) freedom of speech through government action". Chinese reaction to Kong's remarks had been divided; while some criticised his insult on the Hong Kong people, others have expressed support for Kong as justified anger against many Hong Kongers' discrimination against mainlanders.

=== Hong Kong electoral candidates ===
Both candidates in the running for Chief Executive of Hong Kong, Henry Tang and Leung Chun-ying, criticised Kong's public statement. Henry Tang responded by saying professor Kong needs to be responsible for his own statement and that Hong Kong citizens are not dogs. He emphasised this is how Hong Kong citizens deal with each other in a free society. On the other hand, Leung Chun-ying said that Kong's statement did not actually reflect the views of mainland Chinese. He added that this is part of the Hong Kong spirit to respect the law, and that Kong Qingdong should not be over-reacting.

=== Other notable responses ===
- The prominent Chinese artist and dissident Ai Weiwei complained about Peking University's tolerance of Kong Qingdong's behaviour, calling Peking University "a nest of turtles".
- Susan Tse, a Hong Kong opera actress and a fellow descendant of Confucius, criticised Kong Qingdong's "lack of tolerance and respect" of the Hong Kong people. Tse further suggested that Kong should apologise to the Hong Kong people.
- The Hong Kong actor Anthony Wong also rebuked Kong's remarks, suggesting that "if the Hong Kong people are dogs, then Kong Qingdong is a blood relative of dogs".
- An analysis was done by yzzk (Asia magazine), who gave many examples of popular YouTube links showing mainland Chinese misbehaving every day in Hong Kong causing anger. It also highlight many "Chinese events" such as fight for democracy during the 1989 protest, help with activists in need, help with territorial dispute (Diaoyutai islands), disaster relief (2008 Sichuan earthquake) and many more events that HK citizens participated in and were overlooked.
- Jack So, former MTR chairman and CPPCC member who was born in Taiwan, said "We are all the same, we are all Chinese with the same surnames."

== Advertisement controversy ==
=== Anti-Mainland Chinese advertisements ===
The Hong Kong Golden Forum's controversial advertisement published in Apple Daily

Members of the Hong Kong Golden Forum raised more than HK$100,000 to purchase a full-page advertisement in Apple Daily. The advertisement was published on Wednesday 1 February 2012 and featured a giant locust overlooking the city skyline of Hong Kong. The term "locust" is used in Hong Kong as an ethnic slur for mainland Chinese people. The ad makes the statement "Would you like to see Hong Kong spend HK$1 million every 18 minutes on the children of non-Hong Kongers? Hong Kongers have had enough! We strongly demand a stop to the unlimited infiltration of Mainland couples into Hong Kong." The advertisement also employs the derogative term "double illegitimacy" (雙非), which refers to residents of Hong Kong with both parents of illegal status within the territory. Protesters also argued against Hong Kong Basic Law Article 24, although Rita Fan have already said these newborns do not qualify for right of abode.

Hong Kong protesters also launched anti-Mainland Chinese groups on Facebook that reached high popularity, prompting local media to refer to it as an "Anti-Locusts campaign". At least one entry on Sina microblog has been reposted 97,000 times and received 30,000 comments according to the Global Times.

The Hong Kong Equal Opportunities Commission expressed concern over the full-page advertisement; Chairman Lam Woon-kwong said that vilifying remarks will heighten social tension and hostility and called for tolerance and rational debate.

=== Mainland Chinese response ===
Mainland Chinese microblogs launched a retaliatory advertisement against the locust slur, claiming that "if it wasn't the mainland Chinese treating you like a son, you would have died long ago. We must not allow this son (Hong Kong) to ride on our shoulders anymore. Let's temporarily cut off the son's water, electricity and food!"

=== Copycat advertisement in Shanghai ===
A similarly duplicate ad by Shanghai grassroots reused the same picture posted from the HK golden forum, but the words were changed. This copycat ad claims 4 billion RMB is spent each year to subsidise non-locals in Shanghai. In Shanghainese dialect it declares "Shanghainese have had enough. Because you have come for the gold rush, we have to receive 17,566,700 outsiders."

== Additional controversy ==
=== Democracy wall ===
Around 7 Feb, at the Democracy wall of the Hong Kong Polytechnic University, large characters appeared inscribing the words in Chinese characters: "Anti-Locusts" (反蝗蟲). The case have been under investigation. Some students believe this type of vandalism on the democracy wall is just a response to mainland Chinese society not tolerating democracy.

=== Tension extends to university ===
The tension between Hong Kong and mainland China has extended to universities where between 2010 and 2011 Mainland Chinese students were granted 2/3 of the scholarships. There were limited resources available to begin with, now these Hong Kong residents have to compete with mainland Chinese for education, scholarships and jobs post study. Chinese University of Hong Kong vice-Chancellor Joseph Sung have recognised the uneasiness about the situation. The cultural differences also add to the tension where many students from Hong Kong and mainland China can't live together in some campuses.

=== Tension extends to Singapore ===
A Mainland Chinese student Sun Xu (孫旭) from Jiangsu province under Chinese government scholarship at the National University of Singapore wrote a message "in Singapore there are more dogs than humans" on internet forums. Sun Xu faced disciplinary actions and the Chinese embassy apologised for the comment. Sun Xu's comment is said to be influenced by Kong Qingdong. While the comment has raised many issues, some people have agreed. A comment followed by a Mr. Lin who said "Singaporeans are Descendants of Yan and Yellow Emperor who bleed Chinese blood. There is no need to rename a Chinese into a Singaporean."

=== Conflict between Hong Kong and Mainland Chinese reporters ===
On 10 March 2012, a press conference on the issue of mainland Chinese "birth tourism" Kong was held by Guangdong governor Zhu Xiaodan. As the conference was about to end, RTHK reporter Chan Liu-ling asked for Hong Kong reporters to be given a chance to ask questions. Instead the host let reporter Lu Hong-chao from Hong Kong Commercial Daily (owned by the Mainland-Chinese Shenzhen Press Group) ask the last question. As Lu is a mainland Chinese, some Hong Kong reporters were unhappy and said "He isn't from Hong Kong". After the press conference, a fight broke out between Lu and TVB reporter Cheng Sze-ting. Lu, who thought that Cheng made the comment, reportedly started the fight, pushing her and pulling her journalist pass from her chest. When Lu Hong-chao attempted to leave, Cheng Sze-ting, Chan Miu-ling and other Hong Kong reporters surrounded him and requested an apology. At the time other mainland Chinese reporters joined the quarrel and questioned whether Cheng was discriminating against mainland Chinese, despite the mainland Chinese host of the press conference host picking on mainland Chinese during the Q&A session.

== See also ==
- 2012 Anti-Cantonese regulations
- Dolce & Gabbana photo incident
- Birth tourism
- Locust (ethnic slur)
- Hong Kong Independence
- Parallel trading in Hong Kong
- Occupy Central (2011–12)
- 2014 Hong Kong protests
