= Anti–parallel trading protests =

Protests in Hong Kong

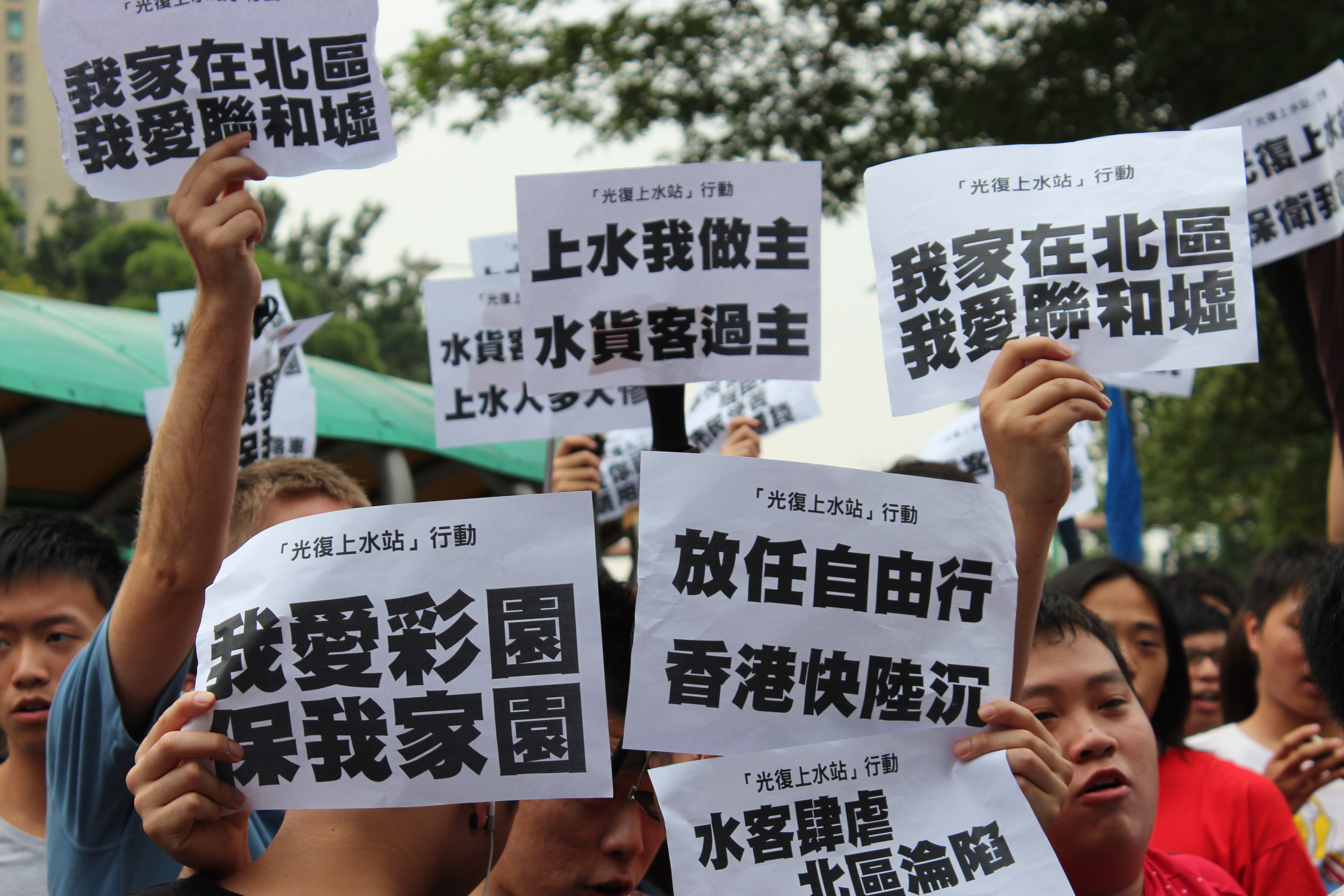
Protestors at Sheung Shui hold up protest slogans

Anti–parallel trading protests (Chinese: 反水貨客示威) took place in Hong Kong between 2012 and 2015, and again in 2019, against parallel traders importing goods from Hong Kong to mainland China. Protestors claim that parallel trading has caused a shortage of household goods and an increasing inflation rate. Parallel trading and the protests have exacerbated the Hong Kong–Mainland conflict. There has also been conflict between local shop owners and citizens as the parallel trading boosts shop sales but raises the local prices of daily necessities.

== Background ==
In 2012, 95% of travellers who travelled between Shenzhen and Hong Kong more than once daily were mainland parallel traders. Mainland consumers are able to earn profits through smuggling because of the advantage of favourable exchange rate, the absence of taxes and tariff in Hong Kong, and lax customs on the mainland side. As multiple entry visa policy permits visa holders to cross the Hong Kong–mainland border many times in one day, thus the mainland parallel traders can export goods from Hong Kong to mainland China frequently. Since the parallel traders buy a large amount of goods in Hong Kong, the local prices in Tuen Mun, Yuen Long, Tai Po and Shatin, which are districts close to the Hong Kong–mainland border, are boosted. Therefore, the first anti–parallel trading protest was started at Sheung Shui in September 2012.

== Protests ==
=== Sheung Shui ===
==== 2012 ====
Sheung Shui anti–parallel trading protests began on 15 September 2012. The first rally was organised on Facebook. Around 50 protesters, angry to the influx of mainland parallel traders, gathered outside Sheung Shui station where a parallel goods distribution centre frequently operated. This action prompted confrontations between the protesters and parallel traders. The number of protesters then increased to over 100 people. Police including the Police Tactical Unit intervened and the protest ended in chaos. Similar protests took place frequently in the days and months that followed, until 2015. This series of protests has been referred to as "Reclaim Sheung Shui" (Chinese: 光復上水).

==== 2019 ====
On 13 July 2019, with the momentum brought by the anti-extradition bill protests, a protest was organized in Sheung Shui opposing cross-border smuggling by mainland Chinese dealers, with 30,000 attendees claimed by the organizer.

The protest was largely peaceful for the first two hours. However, as it went on, the organizer and protesters refused to follow the authorized route, which had Sheung Shui station as the destination. Instead, they marched on Sheung Shui Plaza, occupied some traffic roads and started skirmishing with the police who accused them of participating in an unlawful assembly, triggering an hour-long standoff which lasted until late night. A handful of journalists, including a female one working for the Agence France-Presse, were attacked by the police with batons for their live reporting of the event.

During the skirmishes, protesters vandalised a number of dispensaries that they thought were directly complicit in cross-border smuggling. After the riot police cleared the crowd from the traffic roads, they chased the crowd onto a footbridge leading to Sheung Shui station, when a teenager attempted to jump off the footbridge to escape arrest, but was prevented from doing so jointly by the journalists and police. He was eventually arrested, insulted and ushered into a police van by the police, who told the press that he would be charged with "unlawful assembly", resulting in instant online uproar.

=== Tuen Mun ===
On 8 February 2015, hundreds of protesters chanted slogans at awaiting passengers at Tuen Mun B3X bus stop, and marched along the route of the B3X from Tuen Mun town centre to Shenzhen Bay border crossing. As protesters walked to Yan Ching Street, Police used pepper spray and batons in an attempt to calm rally participants. As a result, police and protesters who injured were sustained aside; 13 locals were arrested.

One month later, on 8 March 2015, around one hundred protesters marched in the V City shopping mall. They walked around the mall while the police were on standby so as to prevent conflict. Later on, they turned to the pharmacies along Yan Ching Street and pulled down the goods. Then, they went to B3X bus stop and tried to use barriers to block the road. Police used shields and batons to separate two groups of people. Some mainland tourists had been surrounded and scolded by protesters. Seven protesters had been arrested in this rally until 11 March 2015.

=== Sha Tin ===
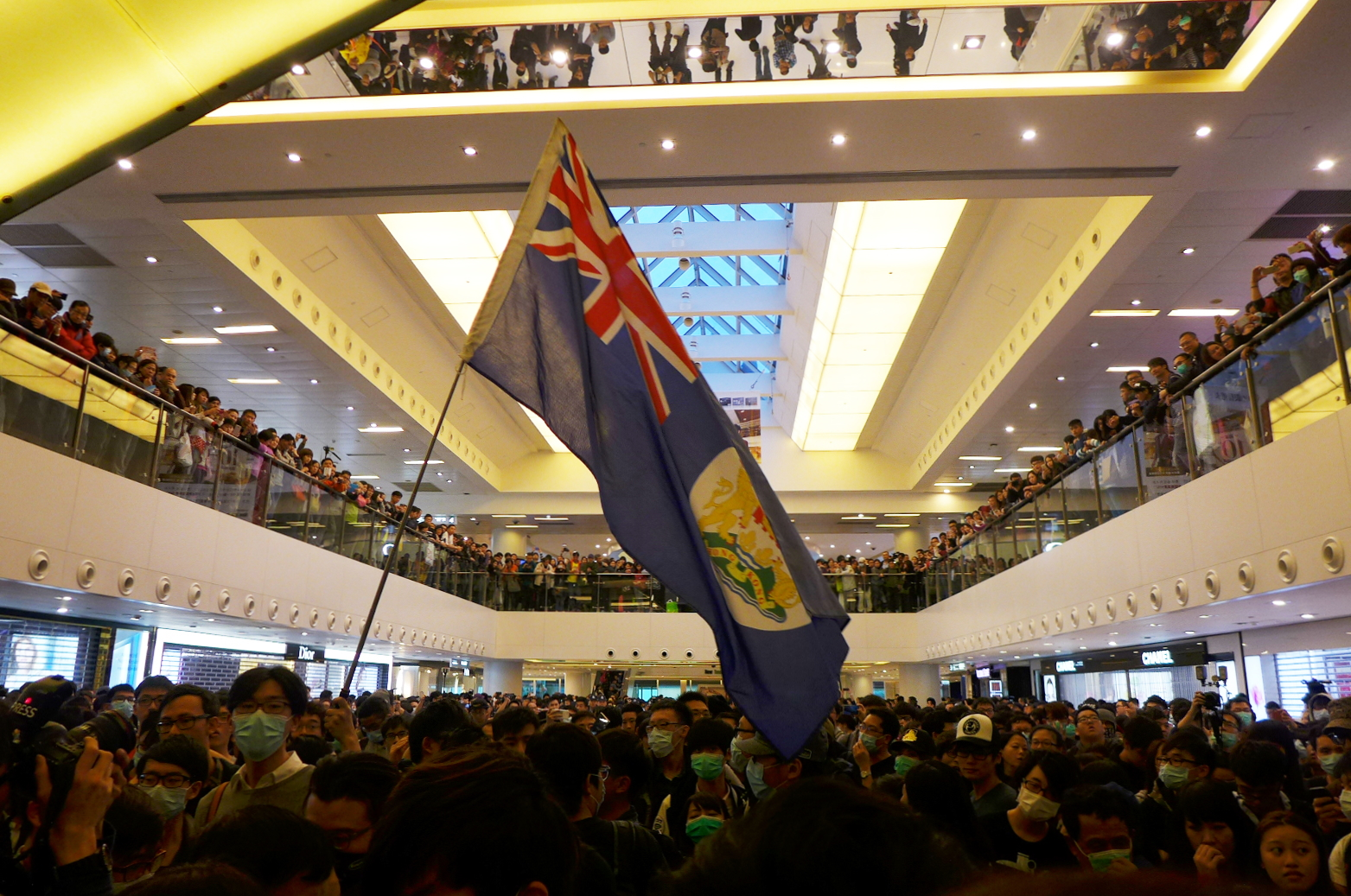
Protest in New Town Plaza with Flag of the British colony of Hong Kong on 15 February 2015

A protest on 15 February 2015 began with more than one hundred protesters gathered at the MTR Sha Tin station and chanted their slogans at New Town Plaza. The tensions and scolding between the demonstrators, mainland tourists and intervention of police officers caused the protest to turn into a conflict. There were around two hundred demonstrators in the whole protest. In this protest, six men were arrested, two citizens and one officer were injured. The protest was initiated by nativist activists and a related Facebook page called "Reclaim Hong Kong, Defend The Local" (光復香港，捍衛本土) and aimed at expressing resent towards parallel traders and the inclination of the shopping mall to the mainland tourists.

=== Yuen Long ===
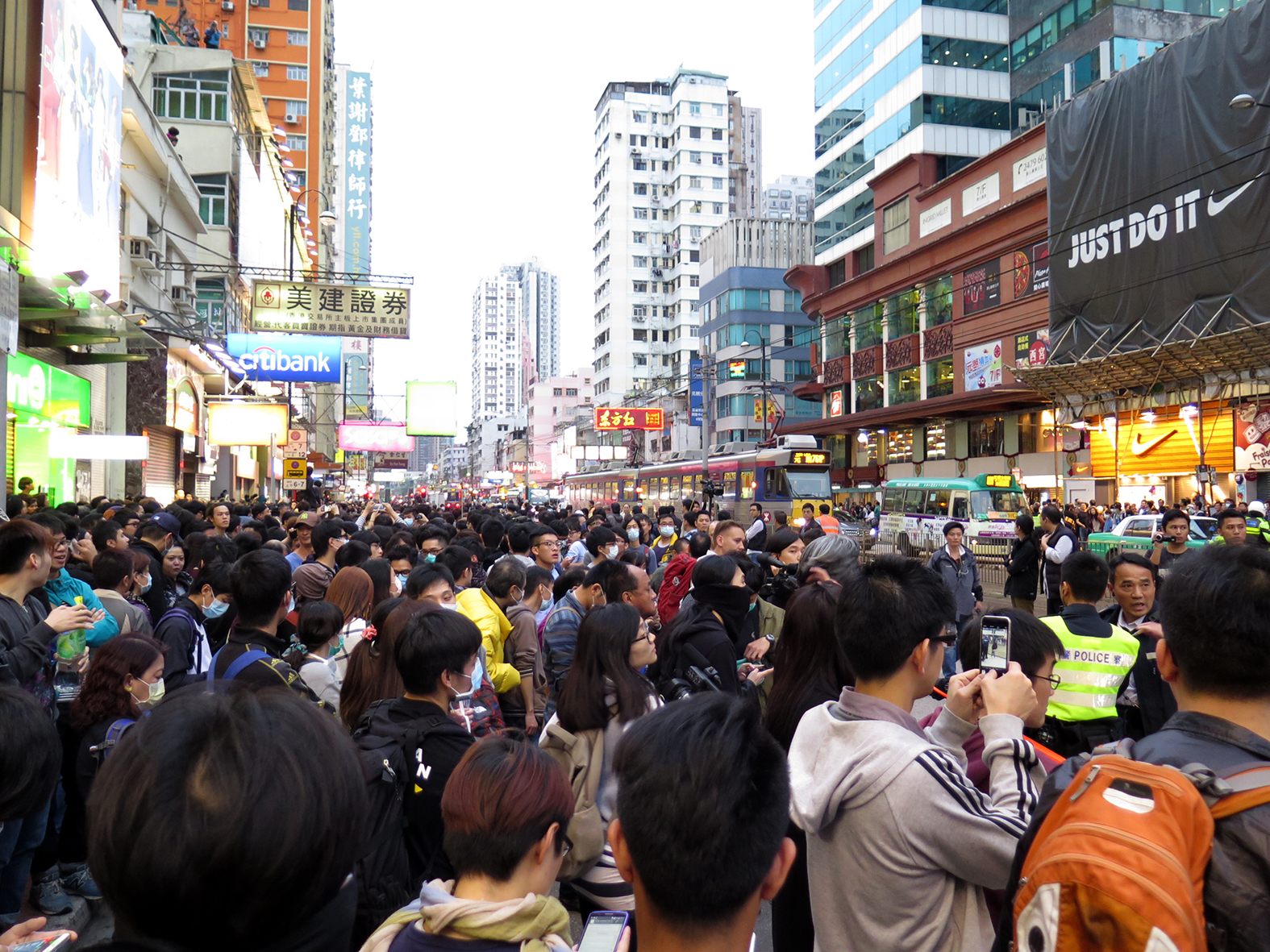
Yuen Long protesters occupy Castle Peak Road YL section 1 March 2015

On 1 March 2015, hundreds of protesters marched from MTR Long Ping station to downtown Yuen Long. The protest caused disruption along Yuen Long's main road and nearby businesses, resulting in conflict between protesters and groups of Yuen Long residents. Police said that during the protest, five officers were injured and thirty-three people were arrested after the demonstration. The protest was launched by two nativist groups which are Hong Kong Indigenous and Civic Passion. They demanded an abolition of the multiple-entry permit plan in the Individual Visit Scheme.

== Social response ==
=== Citizens ===
Democratic Alliance for the Betterment and Progress of Hong Kong and The Hong Kong Federation of Trade Unions strongly condemned that the anti–parallel trading protesters were not rational and damaged the image of Hong Kong. They asked the police enforce to work and protect the safety of workers.

Since the protests happened frequently, more citizens implied that the protesters were more radical than before. They agreed that the parallel traders disturbed their daily life. However, they also stated that the anti–parallel trading protests adversely affected them in recent months.

On the other hand, legislative councillor Gary Fan claimed that the protests happened because the government did not take any adjustment policies. He suggested that the government should put limitation on the individual visit scheme and cancel multiple-entry permit. He believed that the demonstrations will continue if the government do not adjust their policy.

=== Government ===
Secretary for Security, Lai Tung-kwok strongly denounced protesters' behaviour during the anti–parallel trade demonstrations. He said the police will take resolute enforcement action to ensure safety and order.

Police Commissioner Andy Tsang also blamed the protesters and stressed that the police would be decisive in enforcement. He emphasised that people should express their opinions in a peaceful way.

In addition, Zhang Xiaoming the director of the central government liaison office, commented about the protests when meeting the Hong Kong representatives in Beijing. He warned the protesters that the parallel traders are the cause of the problem, but not all the mainland visitors. He claimed that the protesters should not damage the benefits of parallel traders and the problem should not be exaggerated or used as a tool to escalate cross-border conflict.

== See also ==
- Parallel import
- Early 2012 Hong Kong protests
