= Parallel trading in Hong Kong =

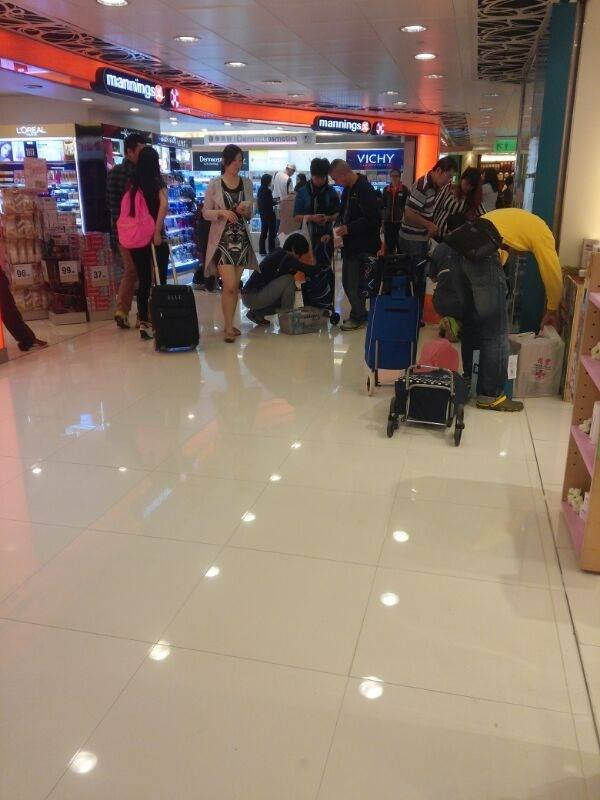
- Parallel traders outside a Mannings store in Sheung Shui
- Traditional Chinese: 水貨客
- Simplified Chinese: 水货客
- Literal meaning: water goods travellers
Transcriptions
Standard Mandarin
- Hanyu Pinyin: shuǐhuò kè
Yue: Cantonese
- Yale Romanization: séui fo haak
- Jyutping: seoi^{2} fo^{3} haak^{3}

Parallel trading in Hong Kong is the phenomenon of Chinese parallel traders taking advantage of multiple entry visa policy to import goods from Hong Kong to mainland China, causing shortages of household goods in various locations starting in the North District in New Territories and expanding to Tuen Mun, Yuen Long, Tai Po and Sha Tin. Problems related to this include increasing congestion from day traders, overloading of infrastructure and disruption of the everyday lives of residents in the northern districts of Hong Kong.

Demand for significant volumes of daily necessities favoured by Shenzhen residents has progressively decreased the numbers of stores catering to local needs, and caused rent inflation and shortage of certain goods such as infant formula.

== Situation ==
Visitors from mainland China have risen from 2.3 million in 1997, to nearly 41 million in 2012 and 53 million in 2013. Since 2012, the problem of parallel trading in Hong Kong became more serious. Media reported that 95% of multi-entrance travellers were Chinese parallel traders. The Shenzhen customs department reported in 2015 that of 33,000 arrests made for trafficking parallel goods across the border since 2010, 80 percent were Hong Kong residents. Zhang Xiaoming, Director of the CGLO in Hong Kong, was satisfied overall with the implementation of the Individual Visit Scheme, and said the problem of parallel trading should not be exaggerated for political reasons. Zhang asserted that 60 percent of parallel traders were Hong Kong residents, and Shenzhen residents on multiple-entry permits accounted for the remainder.

Through multi-entrancing within a day, separating goods into small boxes, exchanging goods in and out between the gates of the MTR station exporting goods to China, parallel traders earn 'transporting charges' by claiming themselves as travellers and that their products are for self-use, saving the costs of tax. Traders mainly gather in Sheung Shui station Exit C and the platform as trading centres to pass on goods to buyers in China. They linger thus causing serious blockage and crowding in the station. Targeting the problem, MTR hired hundreds of staff, erected barriers and gates in attempt to control the situation.

== Causes ==
There were several reasons behind the parallel trading in Hong Kong. First, the strength of the Renminbi against the Hong Kong dollar and the absence of taxes and duties in Hong Kong make goods and everyday commodities more attractive to mainland Chinese consumers. Secondly, the multiple entry visa policy allows visa holders crossing the Hong Kong–Mainland border many times with one application, so that they can export goods from Hong Kong frequently. Due to the prevalence of counterfeiting in mainland China, Hong Kong-sourced products and daily necessities are preferred for their perceived quality and demand for Hong Kong goods is insatiable. Parallel traders who profit by buying goods locally and reselling them in the mainland push up the local prices.

== Effects ==
=== Milk powder shortage ===
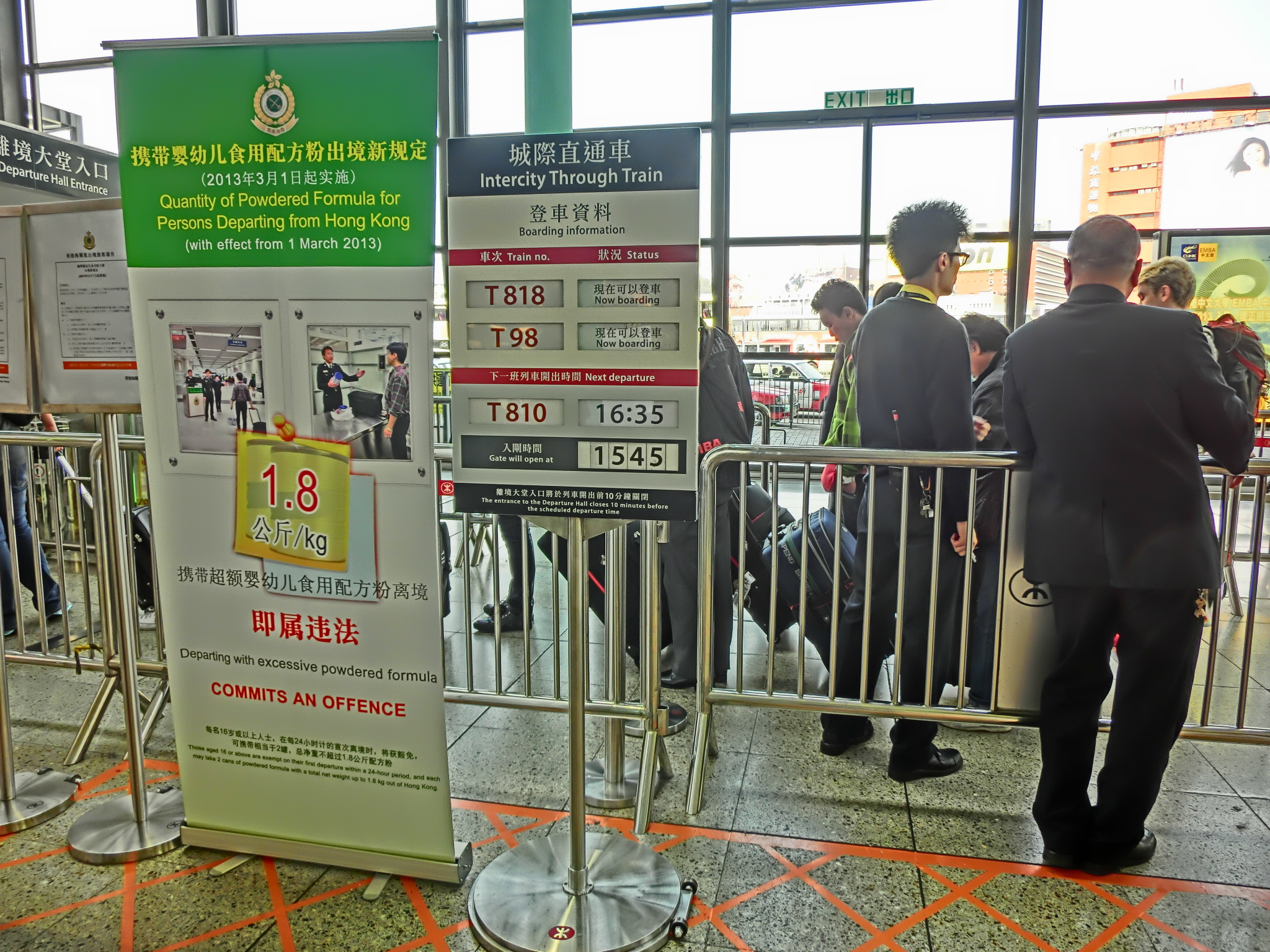
Notice of restriction of powdered formula allowance at the Guangzhou-Kowloon Through Train departure concourse of Hung Hom station in 2013.

Despite the increasing importation of infant formula (powdered formula) from foreign countries, the milk powder shortage intensified greatly due to the intense parallel trading activity in Hong Kong. According to the Neo Democrats, during January 2013, parallel traders hired elderly persons and housewives, giving them $20–$50 per can of milk formula, to line up in front of stores at night to purchase multiple tins of milk powder and then transfer it to traders. Furthermore, ringleader traders hired women with children and the elderly to help them to transport the milk powder across the border to avoid inspections.

According to a staff member in a chain pharmacy, although the store limited each customer to purchasing no more than four cans of milk formula at once, shopkeepers who wanted to meet sales targets often sold more than four cans to mainlanders. Also, there were stores that only sold formula to mainlanders, causing a shortage of milk formula for local consumers.

=== Inflation ===
Parallel trade activities have redistributed supplies of a lot of goods between Hong Kong and the mainland, increasing prices of the goods. For example, milk powder prices increased by 0.4 – 12% from 2009 to 2011. Apart from milk powder, prices of daily necessities in the New Territories also increased. Due to the appreciation of Renminbi against Hong Kong dollar, branded goods sold in Hong Kong which are denominated in Hong Kong dollars gave rise to big discounts for mainlanders who settle bills in Renminbi. Also, the Hong Kong government does not levy any custom tariff on both imports and exports of most products. Therefore, Hong Kong goods are cheaper compared to those in China. Moreover, competition for shop space to open pharmacies, cosmetics and jewellery shops to support parallel trade in the New Territories has driven rent in the New Territories up by two to three times from 2010 to 2012. Small shops catering to local needs are forced to close down and residents have fewer choices. Regional prices rise and increase residents' cost of living.

=== Social disturbance ===
North District of Hong Kong is the hub for parallel trading activities. Crowding of smugglers together with the large amount of commodities and garbage blocked pedestrians, causing environmental problems and endangering the safety of children and the elderly, negatively affecting daily life of citizens in the community. According to a survey done by New Start (新起點) on 27 January 2013, among the 500 Northern District citizens interviewed, 100% of them were discontented with the Government on the issuance of multiple-entry permit. 57% and 72% of the interviewees believe the government was ignoring public grievance and were planning on moving away from gathering areas of parallel traders respectively.

== Citizens' response ==
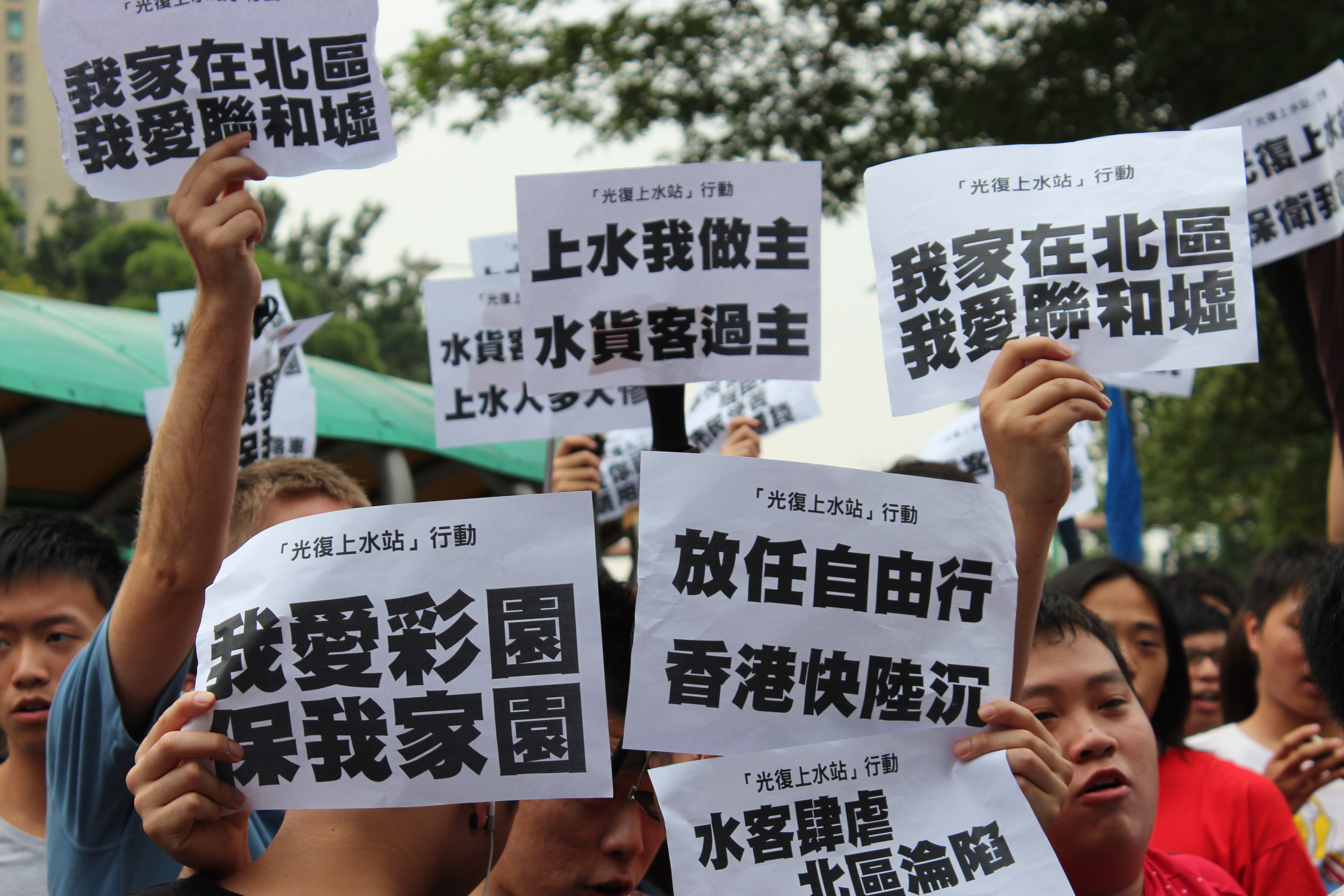
"Reclaim Sheung Shui" protest in 2012.

Anti-mainland netizens formed 'North District Parallel Imports Concern Group' on Facebook to monitor the government on solving the problem of parallel trading and advocate law enforcements against the parallel trading problem. Hong Kong citizens started the "Reclaim Sheung Shui" campaign in September 2012 to expressing their discontent toward parallel trades in Sheung Shui. About 100 Northern District residents gathered outside Sheung Shui Station and protested with slogans and banners. Protesters argued with parallel traders or even fought with those supporting the traffickers.

On 1 February 2015, an arsonist targeted a warehouse that was used by suppliers to parallel traders in Sheung Shui. Since 8 February, the northern territories of Hong Kong have experienced demonstrations most weekend that descended into violence due to clashes between localist camp and police and/or pro-establishment camp. An authorised rally of 400 people that took place in Tuen Mun on 8 February ended with the invasion of two shopping malls which were closed off by police for several hours; Police used pepper spray and batons inside the mall against protesters, and arrested 13 people. At another authorised rally attended by about 200 people on 15 February in Shatin culminated also in mall invasions and six people were arrested. A small protest march on 22 February organised by Population Policy Concern Group and North District Parallel Imports Concern Group and attended by a dozen people headed for the office of New Territories legislator Michael Tien that was inside the Discovery Park shopping mall in Tsuen Wan.

At a rally in Yuen Long on 1 March, many shops along the protest route drew their shutters in anticipation of disturbances. Localist groups Civic Passion and Hong Kong Indigenous clashed with anti-protest groups such as Voice of Loving Hong Kong, and 38 arrests were made by the police. Wildcat demonstrations occurred on 8 March successively in Sheung Shui, Tuen Mun and Tsim Sha Tsui. Approximately 20 people met up in Sheung Shui at 2 pm; the numbers of protesters increased to 100 when rallied moved on to Tuen Mun in the late afternoon. The protesters then adjourned to Tsim Sha Tsui at around 9 pm. A total of six individuals were arrested that day.

== Government's response ==
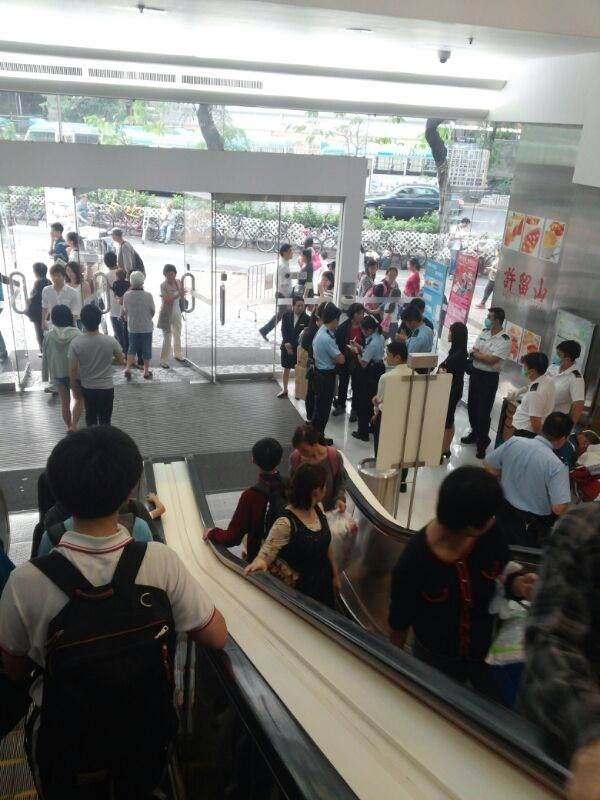
Parallel traders inspected by Hong Kong police in Sheung Shui.

Responding to the parallel trading activities, The Hong Kong Immigration Department and the Police had jointly mounted anti parallel trading and employment operations on 19 September 2012 and 22 January 2013, codenamed Windsand (風沙行動) and Realpower (力鋒行動) respectively.

Hong Kong had taken action against parallel trading activities together with Shenzhen. From September to November 2012, the Hong Kong Immigration Department, the Customs and Excise Department and the Police Force had arrested 406 people in total, within which 60 had been convicted. At the same time, the Shenzhen Customs had arrested more than 4500 parallel traders, persons for receiving goods and 'Observatories'.

The Import and Export (General) (Amendment) Regulation 2013 prohibits the unlicensed export of powdered formula, including milk and soya milk powder for infants and children under 36 months. The Regulation 'does not apply to powdered formula that is exported in the accompanied personal baggage of a person aged 16 or above leaving Hong Kong if the person did not leave Hong Kong in the last 24 hours and the formula does not exceed 1.8 kg in total net weight.'

== See also ==
- Daigou
- Parallel import
- Early 2012 Hong Kong protests
- Liberate Yuen Long (2015)
