= Hong Kong–United States relations =

- Hong Kong: United States

Diplomatic mission
- Hong Kong Economic and Trade Office, Washington, D.C.: United States Consulate General, Hong Kong

Hong Kong–United States relations are bilateral relations between Hong Kong and the United States.

== History ==
=== Before 1997 ===
Hong Kong–United States relations

- Hong Kong: United States

The United States had a consulate in British Hong Kong. Hong Kong was often used as a trade lane between the West and the People's Republic of China during the Cold War.

=== After 1997 ===
U.S. foreign policy toward Hong Kong was stated in the U.S.–Hong Kong Policy Act of 1992. It ruled that the U.S. would continue to treat Hong Kong apart from the People's Republic of China even after the 1997 transfer of sovereignty marking the end of British rule. The United States maintains substantial economic and political interests in Hong Kong. The United States supports Hong Kong's autonomy by concluding and implementing bilateral agreements; promoting trade and investment; arranging high-level visits; broadening law enforcement cooperation; bolstering educational, academic, and cultural links; and supporting the large community of U.S. citizens and visitors.

On the world stage, Hong Kong is an active member of the global coalition against terrorism, and has joined the Container Security Initiative and remains an important partner with regard to eliminating funding for terrorist networks and combating money laundering. Hong Kong has passed legislation designed to bring it into compliance with applicable UN anti-terror resolutions and Financial Action Task Force recommendations.

According to the 2012 U.S. Global Leadership Report, 44% of Hong Kong people approve of U.S. leadership, with 38% disapproving and 18% uncertain. As of 2020, Gallup's report showed an increase of the disapproval rate to 60%, with the approval rate at 31% and uncertainty at 9%.

As of 14 July 2020, the United States no longer recognizes special treatment of Hong Kong under the Hong Kong Autonomy Act and the 45th president Donald Trump's Executive Order on Hong Kong Normalization.

=== Edward Snowden ===
The Edward Snowden incident in 2013 had been a diplomatic crisis between Hong Kong and United States. On May 20, 2013, Edward Snowden, a former Central Intelligence Agency (CIA) employee, arrived in Hong Kong. He leaked classified information from the National Security Agency (NSA) in Hong Kong in early June. Snowden disclosed that "the United States government has committed a tremendous number of crimes against Hong Kong. The PRC as well," going on to identify Chinese Internet Protocol addresses that the NSA monitored and stating that the NSA collected text-message data for Hong Kong residents. On June 22, U.S. officials revoked his passport. On June 23, Snowden boarded a commercial flight to Moscow.

The incidence had proven to be a rare diplomatic conflict between Hong Kong and the United States. At the time, the United States had an active extradition treaty with Hong Kong, Snowden, however, had not been detained by Hong Kong as requested by the United States. Hong Kong authorities said that it was because the United States' extradition request had not fully complied with Hong Kong law, and there was no legal basis to prevent Snowden from leaving. (Note: Hong Kong's Secretary for Justice Rimsky Yuen argued that government officials did not issue a provisional arrest warrant for Snowden due to "discrepancies and missing information" in the paperwork sent by U.S. authorities. Yuen explained that Snowden's full name was inconsistent, and his U.S. passport number was also missing. Hong Kong also wanted more details of the charges and evidence against Snowden to make sure it was not a political case. Secretary for Justice Rimsky Yuen said he spoke to U.S. Attorney General Eric Holder by phone to reinforce the request for details "absolutely necessary" for detention of Snowden. Yuen said "As the US government had failed to provide the information by the time Snowden left Hong Kong, it was impossible for the Department of Justice to apply to a court for a temporary warrant of arrest. In fact, even at this time, the US government has still not provided the details we asked for.") On June 24, U.S. State Department spokesman Patrick Ventrell said "we're just not buying that this was a technical decision by a Hong Kong immigration official. This was a deliberate choice by the government to release a fugitive despite a valid arrest warrant ... though the Privacy Act prohibits me from talking about Mr. Snowden's passport specifically, I can say that the Hong Kong authorities were well aware of our interest in Mr. Snowden and had plenty of time to prohibit his travel."

=== 2019–20 Hong Kong protests ===
A series of protests against the Hong Kong government broke out on 15 March 2019, in response to the 2019 Hong Kong extradition bill. By 9 June, the protests became the subject of global attention as demonstrations grew more violent. The New York Times writes,

“Fueled by anger toward the police, as well as the slow erosion of civil liberties, the largely leaderless protests morphed into a broader, more complicated movement about protecting freedoms, democracy and Hong Kong's autonomy. The list of protesters’ demands has grown to include amnesty for arrested participants and direct elections for all lawmakers and the chief executive.”

The bill was withdrawn and axed, but the protest continued until 2020.

In August 2019, foreign ministry spokeswoman of China Hua Chunying said: "As you all know, they are somehow the work of the US" and that China would "never allow any foreign forces" to interfere in Hong-Kong, and warned that "those who play (with) fire will only get themselves burned."

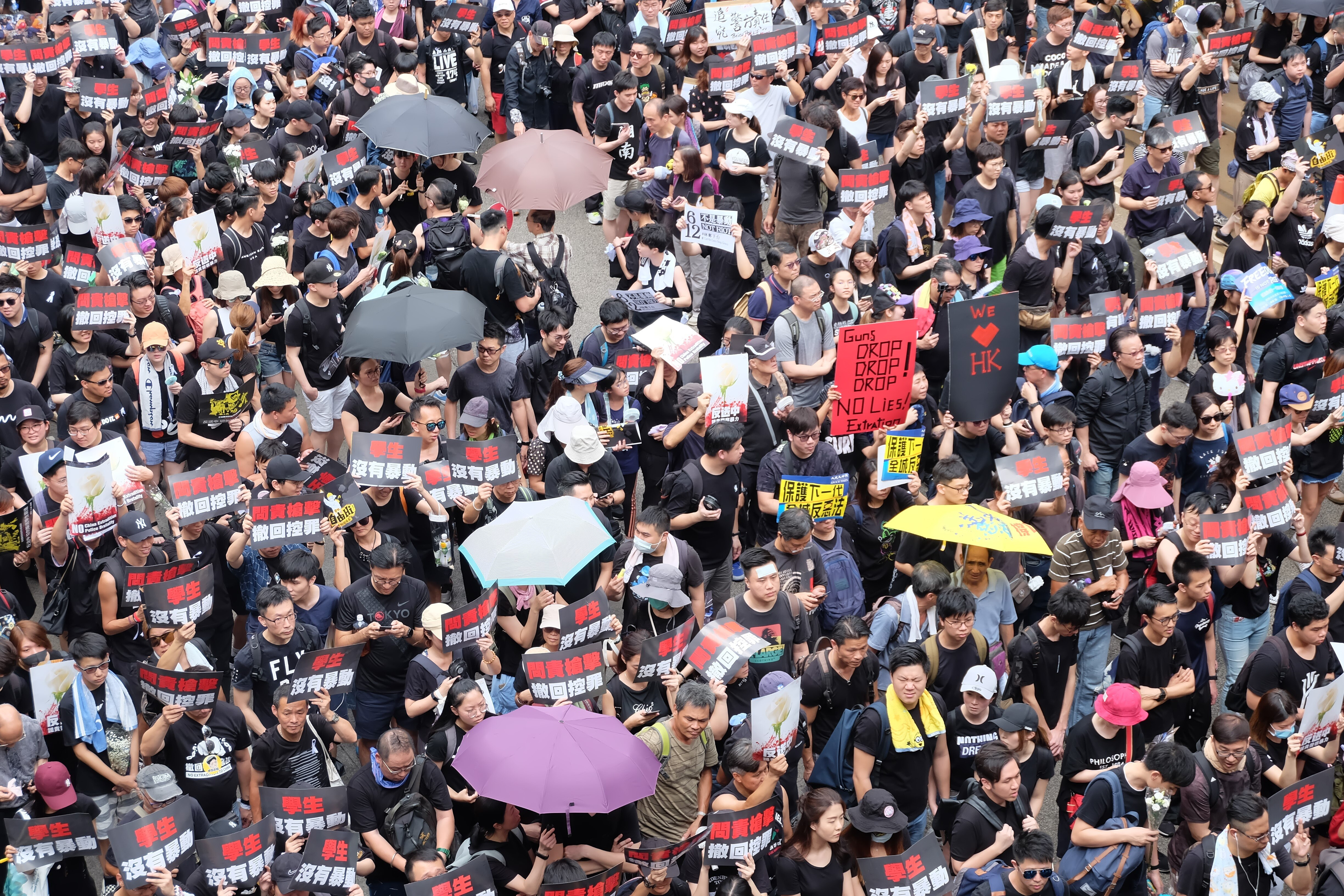
Hong Kong protests of June 2019.

However, when president Trump commented on the ongoing protests he said: "At some point they are going to want to stop that. But that's between Hong Kong and that's between China, because Hong Kong is a part of China." Joseph Cheng, a retired political science professor who is involved in Hong Kong's pro-democracy movement commented on president Trump's comment, he said: "It appears to the Hong Kong people that the Hong Kong issue is not an important issue in the agenda of the president.”, as reported by Bloomberg.

In early September 2019, Hong-Kong protesters were waving "tens of thousands" of US-flags on a march to the US Consulate in Hong Kong asking for help from the Trump administration to help end the confrontations with the Hong Kong government, as reported by CNN.

In November 2019, United States president Donald Trump signed the Hong Kong Human Rights and Democracy Act, which banned the sale of crowd-control munitions like tear gas and rubber bullets to the Hong Kong police. This harmed the United States’ relations with the Hong Kong Government, although both bills have seen strongly positive reactions among the Hong Kong protestors.

The South China Morning Post writes, "The Human Rights and Democracy Act is an extension of the Hong Kong Policy Act, the basis of the US approach since 1992. The US believes human rights are universal, and has a long-standing policy that China should honor its agreements on Hong Kong" and that "It is the United States’ long-standing policy that China honor its commitments to protect those rights, as outlined in the Sino-British Joint Declaration of 1984, an international treaty filed with the United Nations."

=== Revocation of Special Exemptions ===
On 28 May 2020, China's National People's Congress approved the controversial national security law for Hong Kong, which aims at cracking down protests and bans "any acts or activities" that the communist government considers to endanger China's national security. The critics have called this new legislation a "killer blow" to Hong Kong's autonomy and freedoms. The legislation allows the government's national security agencies to operate in Hong Kong.

On 29 May 2020, United States' President Donald Trump ordered to remove the exemptions that give Hong Kong special status in America due to the PRC's new national security law for the territory. Trump announced that the extradition treaty between Hong Kong and the United States will be affected, the United States travel guidance for this territory will be changed, and the officials who undermined Hong Kong's freedoms will be sanctioned. The Hong Kong Autonomy Act imposes sanctions on officials and entities that help violate Hong Kong's autonomy. It was signed into law by President Trump on 14 July 2020, following the enactment of the Hong Kong national security law in June 2020. Under Trump's Executive Order on Hong Kong Normalization, which was also signed the same day, the United States has suspended and eliminated different and preferential treatment of Hong Kong's autonomy. This act also suspends parts of the United States-Hong Kong Policy act of 1992 and effectively states that Hong Kong is no longer treated separate from China.

China's foreign ministry retaliated with counter-sanctions against United States officials for "gross interference in China's affairs", and stated the Act as a "mistake". Hong Kong has expressed severe disappointment and denounced the U.S. for having "politicized juridicial co-operation"

On 19 August 2020, United States president Donald Trump ordered to suspend or terminate three bilateral agreements with Hong Kong. These agreements cover the surrender of fugitives, transfer and convicted prisoners as well as reciprocal tax exemptions on income from international shipping.

On 11 November 2020, China passed new measures to Hong Kong national security law that bars any Hong Kong legislator who opposes Chinese national security laws, refuses to recognize Beijing's sovereignty over Hong Kong, and seeks "foreign countries or foreign forces to interfere in the affairs of the region". Immediately, four Hong Kong legislators, who were pro-democracy and were running for election in the council, were disqualified from Hong Kong's upcoming election. 15 pro-democracy legislators resigned in protest. The Chinese central government stated they wanted Hong Kong to be "governed by patriots".

U.S. national security advisor Robert O'Brien accused China of violating its international commitments and threatened additional sanctions against Chinese officials who were "responsible for extinguishing Hong Kong's freedom”. In response to the recent barring of pro-democracy legislators, O'Brien said that the “‘One country, two systems’ is now merely a fig leaf covering for the CCP's [Chinese Communist Party] expanding one-party dictatorship in Hong Kong". U.S. senators on the committee on foreign relations such as Republican senator, Marco Rubio, and Democratic senator, Jeff Merkley, said democracy in Hong Kong was “gasping for air”. In a statement, the senators said:

“China's unelected and unaccountable national people's congress standing committee took another grave step toward stripping the people of Hong Kong of their sacred rights and freedoms. It is critical that the United States and all allies of freedom come together to recognise and condemn the undeniable and far reaching ramifications of this authoritarian power grab, which has wiped out what little remained of Hong Kong's democratic political system and violates China's treaty obligations.”

=== Joe Biden administration ===
In December 2023, the U.S. State Department again called for Jimmy Lai's release shortly before his trial was set to begin. Spokesperson Matthew Miller said: "We urge Beijing and Hong Kong authorities to respect press freedom in Hong Kong. Actions that stifle press freedom and restrict the free flow of information – as well as Beijing and local authorities’ changes to Hong Kong's electoral system that reduce direct voting and preclude independent and pro-democracy party candidates from participating – have undermined Hong Kong's democratic institutions and harmed Hong Kong's reputation as an international business and financial hub."

In March 2024, the U.S. Secretary of State Antony Blinken stated upon issuing the annual Hong Kong Policy Act report: "This year, I have again certified that Hong Kong does not warrant treatment under U.S. laws in the same manner as the laws were applied to Hong Kong before July 1, 1997. This year’s report catalogs the intensifying repression and ongoing crackdown by PRC and Hong Kong authorities on civil society, media, and dissenting voices, including through the issuance of bounties and arrest warrants for more than a dozen pro-democracy activists living outside Hong Kong. In response, the Department of State is announcing that it is taking steps to impose new visa restrictions on multiple Hong Kong officials responsible for the intensifying crackdown on rights and freedoms, pursuant to Section 212(a)(3)(C) of the Immigration and Nationality Act."

=== Second Trump administration ===
In 2026, the United States removed sanctions on nine Hong Kong and mainland officials. The US State Department stated that the executive order remained in effect as city still lacks sufficient autonomy for different treatment from mainland China, especially concerning export restrictions applied on weapons and technology. According to Bloomberg News in October 2026, "Hong Kong’s political freedoms have largely faded" from the agenda of China–United States relations.

== Consulates and offices ==
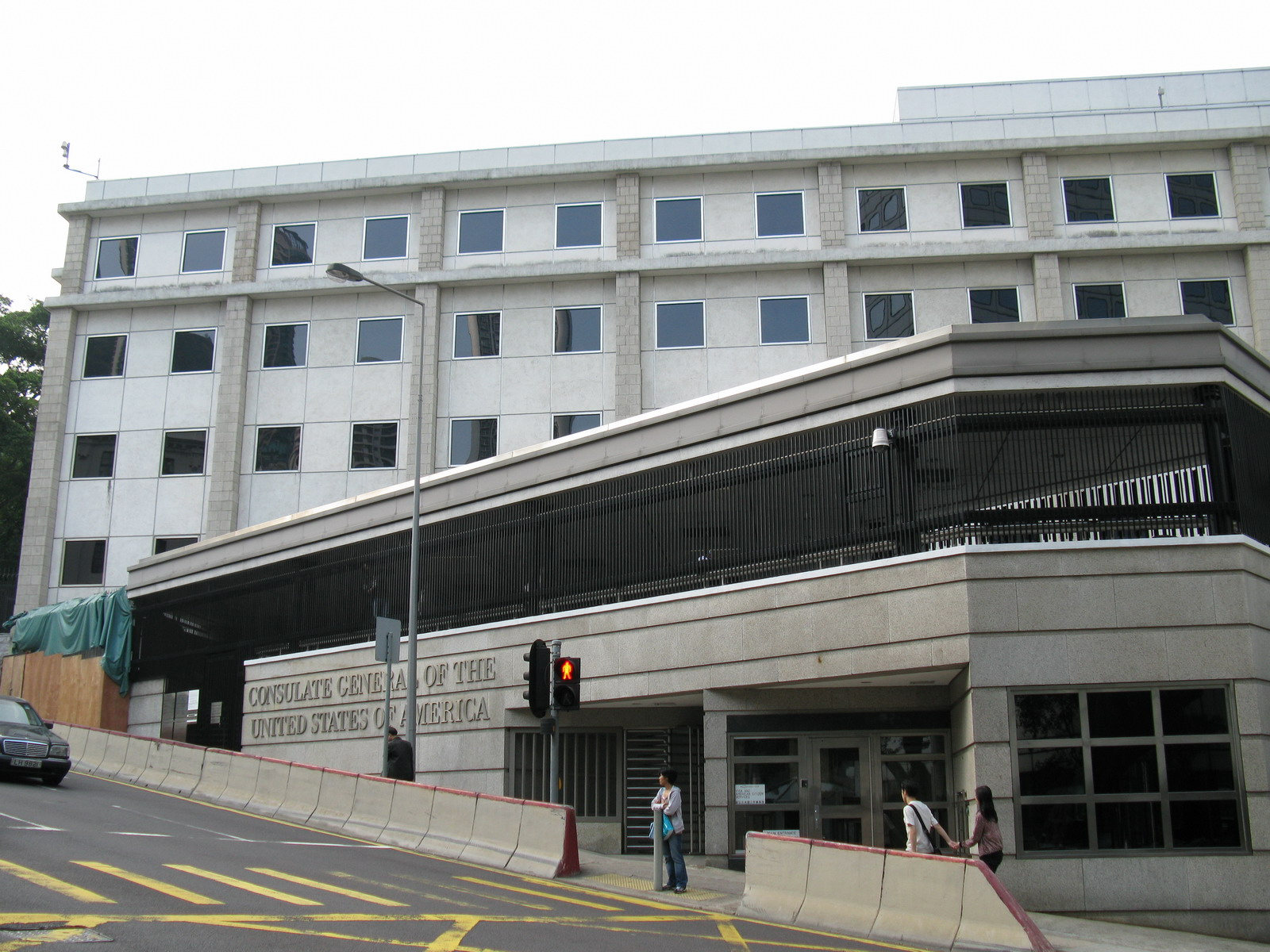
Consulate General of the United States, Hong Kong and Macau in Central

The Hong Kong government maintains Economic and Trade Offices in Washington, D.C., New York City, and San Francisco.

The United States Consulate General Hong Kong is located at 26 Garden Road, Hong Kong. Despite the name, the consulate general is not subordinate to their country's embassy to the PRC in Beijing. The consul-general of the United States holds ambassadorial rank, and reports to the assistant secretary of state for East Asian affairs in the US Department of State. By contrast, the US consuls-general posted to Chengdu, Guangzhou, Shanghai, and Shenyang report to the deputy chief of mission of the US Embassy in Beijing who is directly subordinate to the US ambassador.

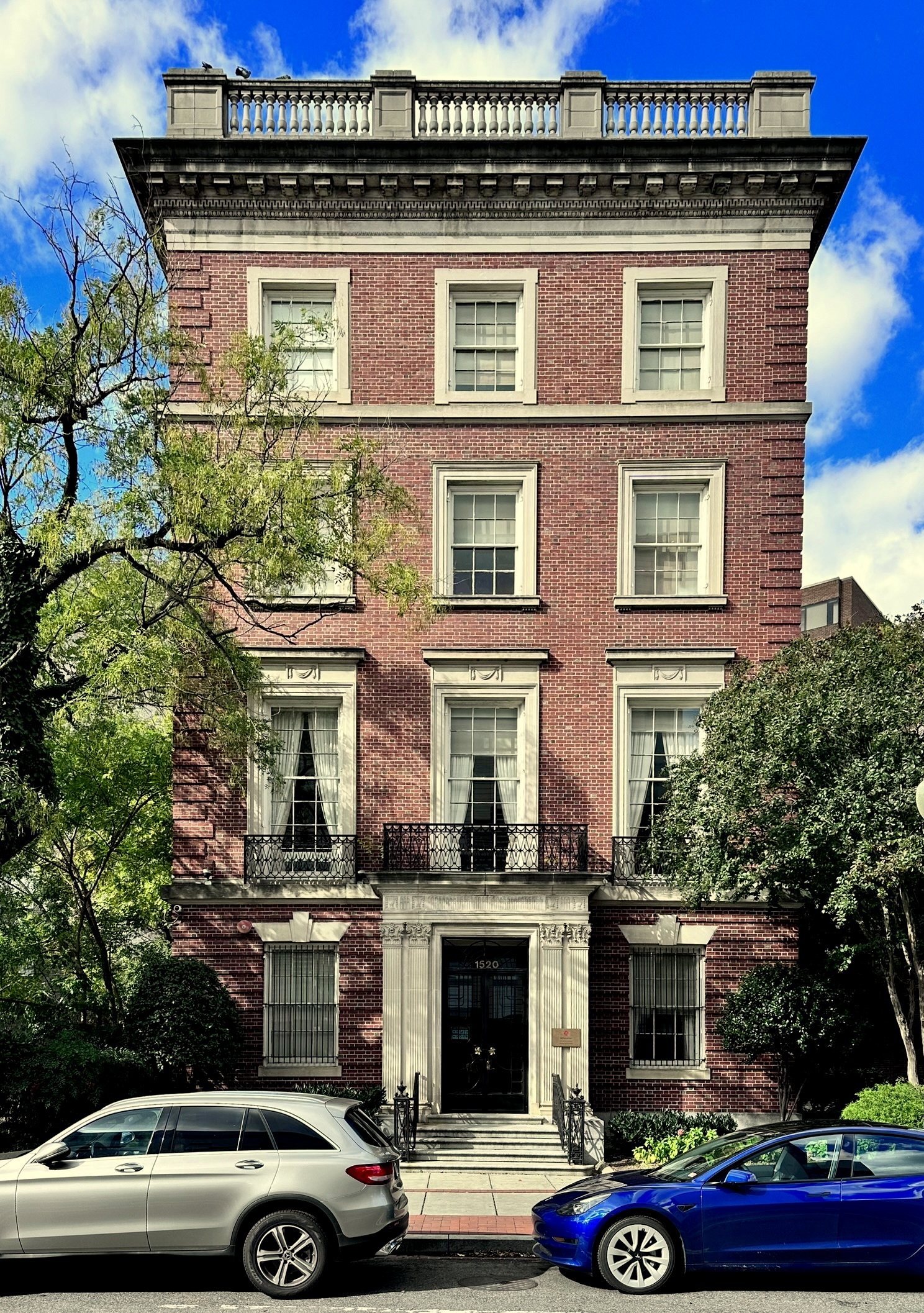
Hong Kong Economic and Trade Office in Washington, D.C.

== Economic relations ==
The United States and Hong Kong have strong economic and social ties together. There are some 1,300 U.S. firms, including 726 regional operations, and about 85,000 American citizens living in Hong Kong. According to U.S. Government statistics, U.S. exports to Hong Kong totaled $17.8 billion in 2006. U.S. direct investment in Hong Kong at the end of 2006 totaled about $38.1 billion, making the United States one of Hong Kong's largest investors, along with mainland China and Japan. According to US merchandise statistics in 2018, Hong Kong's total trade value of $43.8 billion made it the 21st largest trading partner with the US.

Hong Kong is also a full member of the World Trade Organization and maintains a separate customs territory from mainland China. Together with the U.S., Hong Kong is also an independent member of the Asia-Pacific Economic Cooperation forum and Financial Action task Force. Hong Kong enjoyed a high degree of autonomy as a separate customs territory, with no changes to borders, staffing, or technology export controls since the 1997 handover.

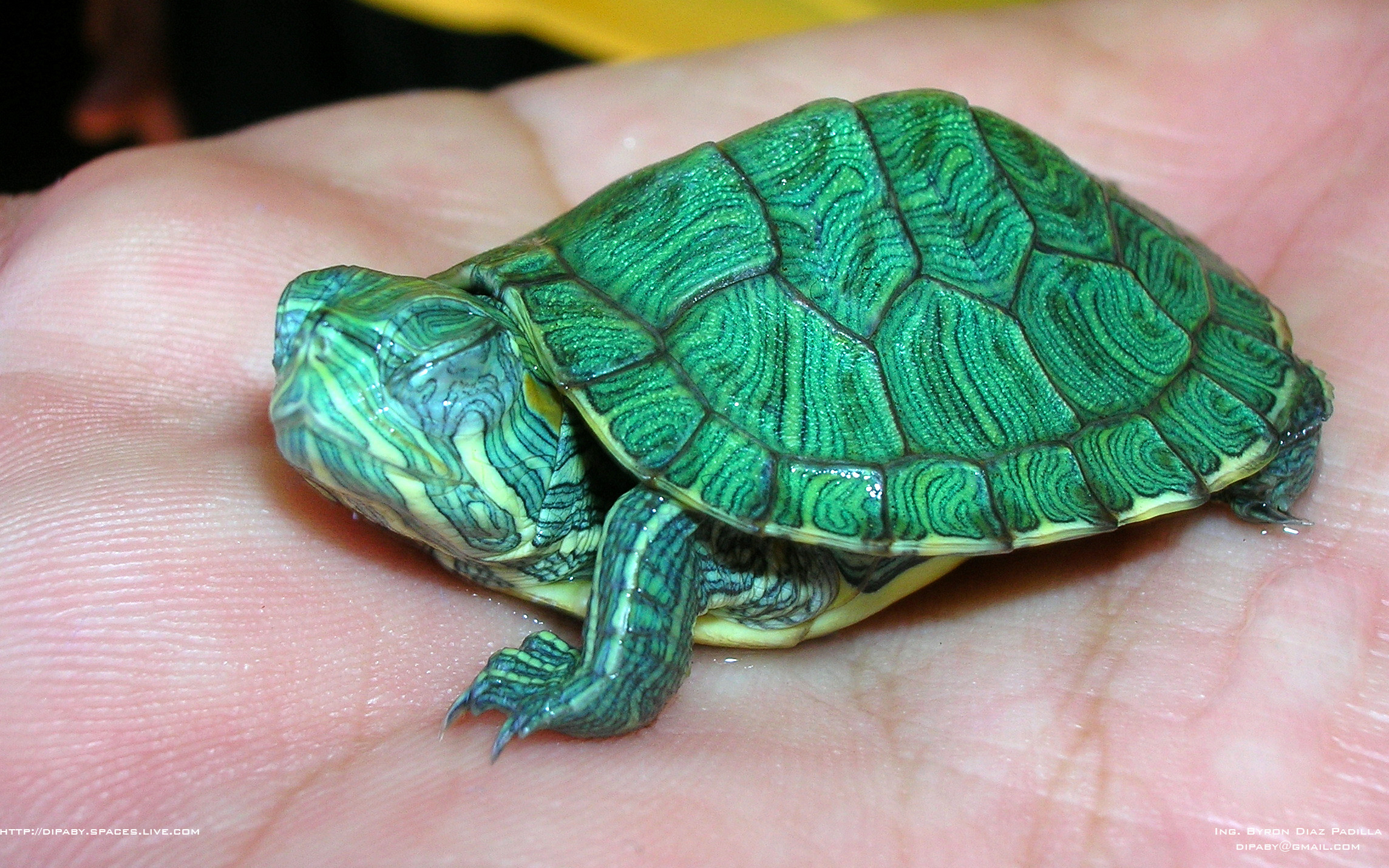
Hong Kong is No. 1 export destination for American turtles.

In October 2002, The United States and Hong Kong signed a civil aviation agreement, which significantly liberalised the aviation market. As one of the largest trading surplus partners with the United States, valued at $31 billion, Hong Kong maintains large imports of American aircraft and spacecraft. Electric machinery, pearls, gold, diamonds, works of art, meat, and fruit and nuts are also significant imports from Hong Kong. American exports to Hong Kong valued at $12.8 billion in 2018. The United States is one of Hong Kong's largest sources of foreign direct investment. The Office of the U.S. Trade Representative and other U.S. agencies regularly cite Hong Kong as a leading example of complex trading systems.

Intellectual property rights (IPR) protection had improved substantially in recent years and the introduction of effective new legislation to control illicit production and improved enforcement had now made Hong Kong a regional model for effective IPR protection. However, online piracy has not been effectively addressed with current copyright laws.

With the signing of the Hong Kong Autonomy Act in 2020, United States customs requires goods imported from Hong Kong to use the "Made in China" label instead of "Made in Hong Kong". Hong Kong's commerce secretary Edward Yau condemned these measures by the U.S. He asked, “How could a Hong Kong-made product be labelled as a product as made in some other place?” and stated that the rules "doesn't comply with WTO rules... over the origin of products". Yau expressed concerns of Hong Kong's future as a separate customs territory and international trading centre and denounced the U.S. for undermining the integrity of Hong Kong.

Hong Kong Chief Secretary Eric Chan said on February 4, 2025, that Hong Kong will complain to the World Trade Organization about recent US tariffs imposed on the city. In April the Trump Administration implemented a 90-day pause on tariffs for Hong Kong. The United States has been negotiating Hong Kong tariffs with mainland China.

== See also ==
- Hong Kong Americans
- Foreign relations of Hong Kong
- Foreign relations of the United States
- United States–Hong Kong Agreement for the Surrender of Fugitive Offenders
