= Executive Order 13936 =

Executive order to normalize United States–Hong Kong relations

- The President's Executive Order on Hong Kong Normalization

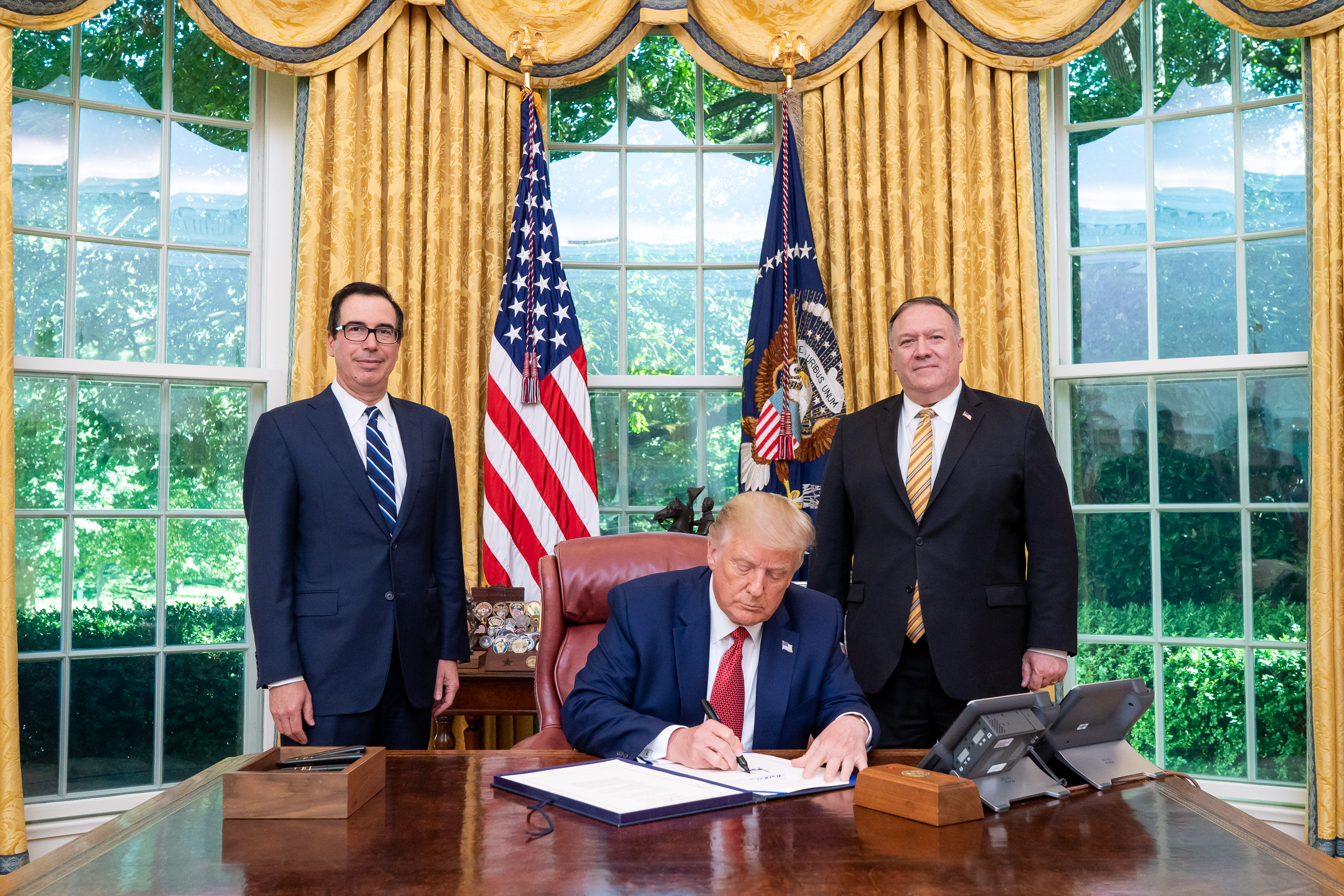
- President Donald Trump signing the order at the Resolute desk, with Secretary of the Treasury Steven Mnuchin (left) and Secretary of State Mike Pompeo (right)
- Type: Executive order
- Number: 13936
- President: Donald Trump
- Signed: July 14, 2020

Federal Register details
- Federal Register document number: 2020-15646
- Publication date: July 17, 2020
- Document citation: 85 FR 43413

Summary
- Suspends or eliminates different and preferential treatment for Hong Kong

Executive Order 13936, entitled "The President's Executive Order on Hong Kong Normalization", is an executive order signed by U.S. President Donald Trump on July 14, 2020. On the same day Trump had signed into law Hong Kong Autonomy Act, one of the laws from which the order derives authority. The act and the executive order are the U.S. response to the imposition of a controversial national security law in Hong Kong by the Standing Committee of the National People's Congress of China on June 30, 2020, which was described as "an unusual and extraordinary threat [...] to the national security, foreign policy, and economy of the United States" in the preamble.

According to Trump, he said the executive order was to "hold China accountable for its aggressive actions against the people of Hong Kong", and Hong Kong would be treated the same as China. The order directs government agencies to eliminate preferential treatments given to Hong Kong as compared to mainland China.

In July 2026, the national emergency declared in the order, which had previously been extended, was allowed to lapse by the US and would no longer be applicable.

== Background ==
The Hong Kong Policy Act of 1992 (HKPA), last amended by the Hong Kong Human Rights and Democracy Act of 2019, is the groundwork for U.S. policies that maintain relations with Hong Kong as separate from mainland China, to the extent consistent with the 1984 Sino-British Joint Declaration, after the handover of Hong Kong. While existing U.S. laws and certain international agreements continue to apply to the Hong Kong Special Administrative Region after July 1997, section 202 of the act allows the U.S. president to issue an executive order to suspend such treatments if he determines that Hong Kong "is not sufficiently autonomous to justify treatment" different from that accorded China under U.S. laws.

In May 2020, after the Chinese National People's Congress decision on Hong Kong national security legislation was adopted, Secretary of State Mike Pompeo reported to the U.S. Congress that Hong Kong was no longer autonomous. Following the enactment of the Hong Kong national security law by Standing Committee of the National People's Congress in June 2020, the U.S. Congress promptly and unanimously passed the Hong Kong Autonomy Act.

== Provisions ==
The measures introduced in the executive order include:

- Export control
  - All of Hong Kong's license under the Export Administration Regulations that are not available to China are to be revoked
  - The export of "U.S.-origin defense equipment" to Hong Kong is to be ended under the Arms Export Control Act
- Sanctions
  The Secretary of the Treasury or the Secretary of State can impose sanctions on foreign persons who are:
  - engaged in developing, adopting, or implementing the Hong Kong national security law
  - engaged in undermining the democracy, threatening the autonomy, imposing censorship or committing serious human rights abuse in Hong Kong
  - leaders or officials of a government or private entities engaged in the above activities
- Law Enforcement
  Notice of intent is given to:
  - suspend the Agreement for the Surrender of Fugitive Offenders
  - terminate the Agreement for the Transfer of Sentenced Persons
  - end the provision of training to the Hong Kong Police at the International Law Enforcement Academies
- Travel and Immigration
  Hong Kong is no longer treated as separate from China:
  - for the purpose of numerical limitations on immigration under the Immigration Act of 1990
  - with respect to the duration of nonimmigrant visas under Immigration and Nationality Act of 1952
  - for the Diversity Immigrant Visa program (commonly known as the green card lottery)
  - for the eligibility of its residents to Visa waiver programs of Guam and the Northern Mariana Islands (both holders of HKSAR Passport and British National (Overseas) passport are affected)
- Other provisions
  - Hong Kong is to be treated as the same as China by the Committee on Foreign Investment in the United States in its annual reporting
  - A notice of intent is to be given to terminate a 1989 bilateral agreement granting reciprocal exemption of income tax
  - The Fulbright exchange program with Hong Kong and China is to be terminated
  - The cooperation between the United States Geological Survey and the Chinese University of Hong Kong's Institute of Space and Earth Information Science is discontinued

== Implementation ==
=== Sanctions ===
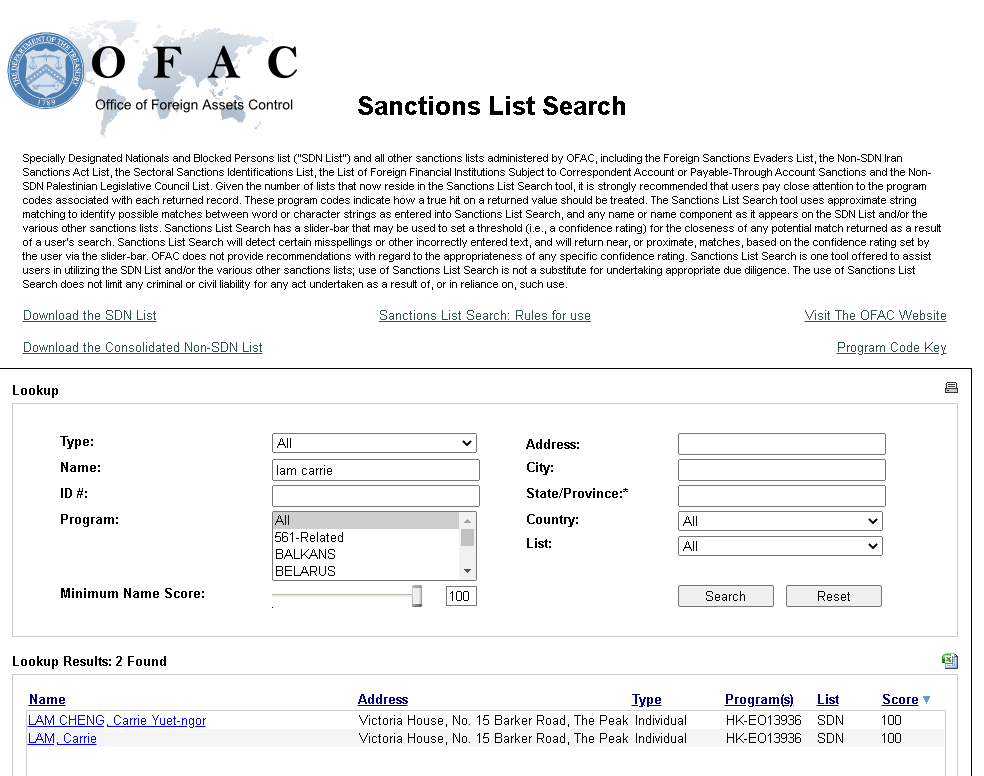
Search result of Carrie Lam, the Chief Executive of Hong Kong, in the OFAC Sanction List (i.e. SDN List)

The United States imposed six rounds of sanctions under this Executive Order, four of which targeted Hong Kong officials. As a result of their inclusion in the Specially Designated Nationals List, all of the property and interests in property in the United States are blocked for the sanctioned and must be reported to the Office of Foreign Assets Control. All United States citizens are prohibited from transactions (including the contribution or provision of funds, goods or services) involving the property or interest of the eleven sanctioned persons.

On August 7, 2020, Chief Executive Carrie Lam, who pushed through the 2019 Hong Kong extradition bill, and five other Hong Kong government officials were sanctioned by the United States Department of the Treasury by President Trump for "undermining Hong Kong's autonomy and restricting the freedom of expression or assembly". The sanction is based on the Hong Kong Autonomy Act and Lam would be listed in the Specially Designated Nationals and Blocked Persons List. Other sanctioned individuals include: Chris Tang, Commissioner of Police, under whose leadership the police besieged the Hong Kong Polytechnic University in November 2019, as well as his predecessor Stephen Lo. John Lee, the security minister who would later become the Chief Executive, was also sanctioned. Four Chinese officials were targeted in the sanction, including Xia Baolong, Luo Huining, and Zheng Yanxiong, who were respectively directors of the Hong Kong and Macao Affairs Office, Hong Kong Liaison Office, and Office for Safeguarding National Security (OSNS). On November 9, 2020, four more individuals from the OSNS and the National Security Department of the Hong Kong Police Force were sanctioned. Another round of sanction was made on December 7, 2020 by the U.S. Department of the Treasury in pursuant to the order. The entire 14 Vice Chairpersons of the National People's Congress of China were sanctioned for "undermining Hong Kong's autonomy and restricting the freedom of expression or assembly". On January 15, 2021, 6 more individuals were sanctioned. On July 16, 2021, all 7 deputy directors of the Hong Kong Liaison Office were sanctioned for their role in reducing Hong Kong's autonomy, pursuant to the 2020 Hong Kong Autonomy Act:

On March 31, 2025, the Trump administration sanctioned six more security and police officials after Beijing and Hong Kong were accused of transnational repression for attempting to "to intimidate, silence, and harass 19 pro-democracy activists who were forced to flee overseas": In particular, Secretary for Justice Paul Lam was sanctioned for developing or implementing the Safeguarding National Security Ordinance.

List of sanctioned individuals
| Individual | Capacity | Officials | Date | Terminated |
|---|---|---|---|---|
| Carrie Lam | Chief Executive (2017–22) | Hong Kong | August 7, 2020 | |
| Chris Tang | Commissioner of Police (2019–21), Secretary for Security (2021–) | Hong Kong | August 7, 2020 | |
| Stephen Lo | Commissioner of Police (2015–19) | Hong Kong | August 7, 2020 | July 2026 |
| John Lee | Secretary for Security (2017–21), Chief Secretary for Administration (2021–22), Chief Executive (2022–) | Hong Kong | August 7, 2020 | |
| Teresa Cheng | Secretary for Justice (2018–22) | Hong Kong | August 7, 2020 | |
| Erick Tsang | Secretary for Constitutional and Mainland Affairs (2020–26) | Hong Kong | August 7, 2020 | |
| Eric Chan | Secretary-General of the Committee for Safeguarding National Security (2020–22), Chief Secretary for Administration (2022–) | Hong Kong | August 7, 2020 | |
| Xia Baolong | Director of the Hong Kong and Macao Affairs Office (2020–) | China | August 7, 2020 | |
| Zhang Xiaoming | Deputy Director of the Hong Kong and Macao Affairs Office (2020–22) | China | August 7, 2020 | |
| Luo Huining | Director of the Hong Kong Liaison Office (2020–23) | China | August 7, 2020 | |
| Zheng Yanxiong | Director of the Office for Safeguarding National Security (2020–23), Director of the Hong Kong Liaison Office (2023–25) | China | August 7, 2020 | |
| Edwina Lau | Head of National Security Department (2020–23) | Hong Kong | November 9, 2020 | |
| Steve Li Kwai-Wah | Senior Superintendent at National Security Department, Chief Superintendent at National Security Department (2023–) | Hong Kong | November 9, 2020 | |
| Li Jiangzhou | Deputy Director of the Office for Safeguarding National Security (2020–) | China | November 9, 2020 | |
| Deng Zhonghua | Deputy Director of the Hong Kong and Macao Affairs Office (2018–2022) | China | November 9, 2020 | |
| Cai Dafeng | Vice Chairperson of the Standing Committee of the National People's Congress | China | December 7, 2020 | |
| Cao Jianming | Vice Chairperson of the Standing Committee of the National People's Congress | China | December 7, 2020 | |
| Chen Zhu | Vice Chairperson of the Standing Committee of the National People's Congress | China | December 7, 2020 | |
| Padma Choling | Vice Chairperson of the Standing Committee of the National People's Congress | China | December 7, 2020 | |
| Ding Zhongli | Vice Chairperson of the Standing Committee of the National People's Congress | China | December 7, 2020 | |
| Hao Mingjin | Vice Chairperson of the Standing Committee of the National People's Congress | China | December 7, 2020 | |
| Arken Imirbaki | Vice Chairperson of the Standing Committee of the National People's Congress | China | December 7, 2020 | |
| Ji Bingxuan | Vice Chairperson of the Standing Committee of the National People's Congress | China | December 7, 2020 | |
| Shen Yueyue | Vice Chairperson of the Standing Committee of the National People's Congress | China | December 7, 2020 | |
| Wan Exiang | Vice Chairperson of the Standing Committee of the National People's Congress | China | December 7, 2020 | |
| Wang Chen | Vice Chairperson of the Standing Committee of the National People's Congress | China | December 7, 2020 | |
| Wang Dongming | Vice Chairperson of the Standing Committee of the National People's Congress | China | December 7, 2020 | |
| Wu Weihua | Vice Chairperson of the Standing Committee of the National People's Congress | China | December 7, 2020 | |
| Zhang Chunxian | Vice Chairperson of the Standing Committee of the National People's Congress | China | December 7, 2020 | |
| Tam Yiu-Chung | Hong Kong delegate to the Standing Committee of the National People's Congress (2018–23) | Hong Kong | January 15, 2021 | |
| Frederic Choi | Senior Assistant Commissioner of Police (National Security) (2020–2021) | Hong Kong | January 15, 2021 | |
| Andrew Kan | Senior Assistant Commissioner of Police (National Security) (2021–2023), Head of National Security Department (2023–) | Hong Kong | January 15, 2021 | |
| Kelvin Kong | Senior Assistant Commissioner of Police (National Security) (2023–) | Hong Kong | January 15, 2021 | |
| You Quan | Deputy Leader of the Central Leading Group on Hong Kong and Macau Affairs | China | January 15, 2021 | |
| Sun Qingye | Deputy Director of the Office for Safeguarding National Security (2020–) | China | January 15, 2021 | |
| Chen Dong | Deputy directors of the Hong Kong Liaison Office | China | July 16, 2021 | |
| Yang Jianping | Deputy directors of the Hong Kong Liaison Office | China | July 16, 2021 | July 2026 |
| Qiu Hong | Deputy directors of the Hong Kong Liaison Office | China | July 16, 2021 | July 2026 |
| Lu Xinning | Deputy directors of the Hong Kong Liaison Office | China | July 16, 2021 | |
| Tan Tieniu | Deputy directors of the Hong Kong Liaison Office | China | July 16, 2021 | |
| He Jing | Deputy directors of the Hong Kong Liaison Office | China | July 16, 2021 | |
| Yin Zonghua | Deputy directors of the Hong Kong Liaison Office | China | July 16, 2021 | |
| Paul Lam | Secretary for Justice (2022–) | Hong Kong | March 31, 2025 | July 2026 |
| Sonny Au Chi-kwong | Secretary-General of the Committee for Safeguarding National Security (2022–) | Hong Kong | March 31, 2025 | July 2026 |
| Raymond Siu | Commissioner of Police (2021–25) | Hong Kong | March 31, 2025 | July 2026 |
| Dick Wong Chun-chung | Assistant Commissioner of Police (National Security) | Hong Kong | March 31, 2025 | July 2026 |
| Margaret Chiu Wing-lan | Assistant Commissioner of Police (National Security) | Hong Kong | March 31, 2025 | July 2026 |
| Dong Jingwei | Director of the Office for Safeguarding National Security | China | March 31, 2025 | July 2026 |

=== Country of origin marking of products ===
The executive order suspended the application of section 201(a) of HKPA to section 304 of the Tariff Act of 1930 (19 U.S. Code § 1304), which stipulates that every article of foreign origin shall be marked the English name of the country of origin. On August 11, 2020, U.S. Customs and Border Protection (USCBP) announced that the imported goods produced in Hong Kong could no longer indicate themselves as "Made in Hong Kong" after September 25, but must indicate "China" as the country of origin instead. This reversed the practice announced by the then-U.S. Customs Service in June 1997, which determined that goods from Hong Kong should continue to indicate their origin as "Hong Kong" after July 1, 1997.

This change does not affect the reporting for purposes of assessing duties under the Harmonized Tariff Schedule of the United States.

=== Immigration ===
The Executive Order stripped Hong Kong of favorable treatment, no longer treating it separately from the People’s Republic of China for immigration purposes. It is plausible that the U.S. Department of State may not have fully implemented the Executive Order’s mandated change. The Department of State Visa Bulletin indicates that 814 immigrant visas were issued to Foreign State Hong Kong in 2024, compared with 760 visas in 2020 and 838 in 2021. These visas might have been issued under the grandfather rule. In addition, the Adjustment of Status Filing Charts Bulletin still includes a column designated exclusively as “CHINA-mainland born” that excludes Hong Kong-born citizens.

=== Suspension or termination of three bilateral agreements ===
On August 18, 2020, the Consulate General of the United States in Hong Kong notified the government of Hong Kong that the United States had suspended or terminated three bilateral agreements: for the surrender of fugitive offenders, for the transfer of sentenced persons and for reciprocal tax exemptions on income derived from the international operation of ships. The U.S. Department of State referred to this as part of the implementation measures set forth in the executive order.

== Responses ==
=== Signing of the executive order ===
China's ministry of foreign affairs criticized the United States for interfering in "purely China’s internal affairs", namely the implementation of a law that safeguards the country's national security. The spokesperson urged the United States to "correct its mistakes", otherwise China will give "firm response" and impose sanctions on relevant U.S. persons.

The HKSAR government, in addition to reiterating the necessity of the national security law, said the SAR's special status as a separate customs territory, under the "One Country, Two Systems" principle, is conferred by the PRC Constitution and the Hong Kong Basic Law. It warned the United States that unliteral measures that limit normal business activities would affect its own interests, and stressed that the measures imposed under Hong Kong Autonomy Act and the executive order "do not have any legal effect" on Hong Kong's financial institutions. It might also consider taking actions against the United States under the rules of the World Trade Organization (WTO).

=== Countersanctions ===
On August 11, 2020, China imposed sanctions without specification on eleven U.S. individuals, namely Senators Marco Rubio, Ted Cruz, Josh Hawley, Tom Cotton and Pat Toomey, Representative Chris Smith, Carl Gershman (president of the National Endowment for Democracy), Derek Mitchell (president of the National Democratic Institute), Daniel Twining (president of the International Republican Institute), Kenneth Roth (executive director of the Human Rights Watch) and Michael Abramowitz (president of Freedom House). The spokesman of the foreign ministry said the sanctioned "behaved badly" on Hong Kong-related issues. Rubio, Cruz and Smith had been put on a travel ban by China.

=== Criticism by the Hong Kong government ===
The Hong Kong government denounced the executive order as having "[politicized] juridical co-operation." As a result, the Hong Kong government announced that it had, at the central government's instruction, notified the U.S. Consulate General of the suspension of the agreements of surrender of fugitive offenders and of mutual legal assistance on criminal matters.

Hong Kong's commerce secretary Edward Yau condemned USCBP's measures, saying labelling a product from Hong Kong as "made in some other place" was "calling white black". He added that this practice did not comply with WTO rules, as it undermined Hong Kong's status as a separate customs territory.

== Extensions ==
The national emergency declared in the executive order was extended for another year by U.S. President Joe Biden on July 7, 2021, July 11, 2022, July 11, 2023, and July 12, 2024, and by President Donald Trump on July 10, 2025. The national emergency was not extended in 2026, ending its application.
