= Samuel Chu =

Hong Kong activist (born 1978)

- 朱牧民
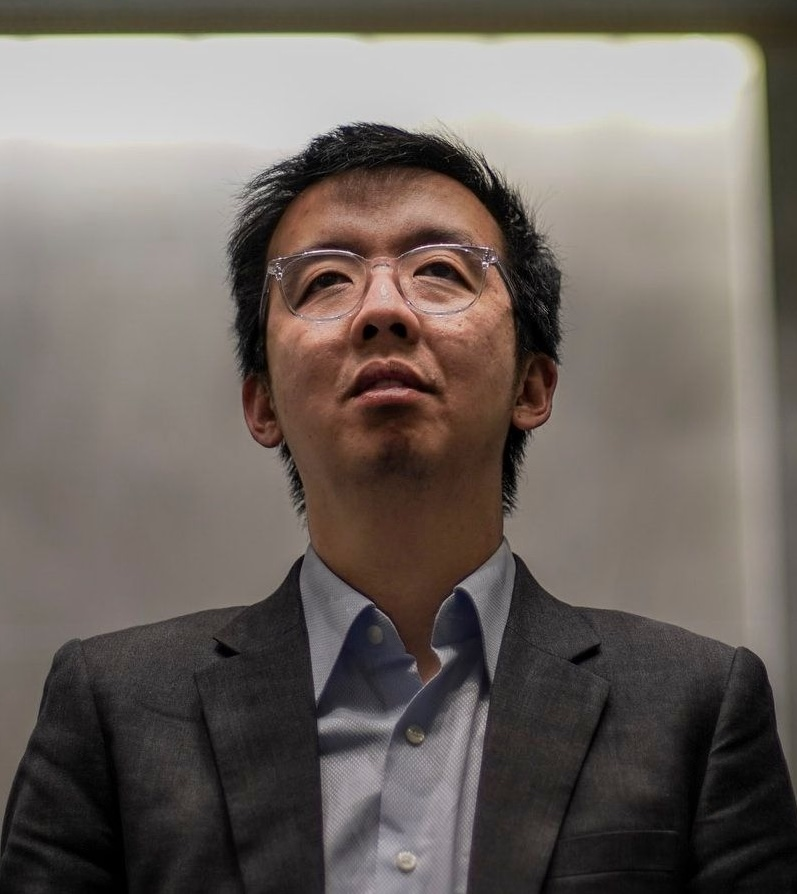
- Samuel Chu in 2022
- Born: Samuel Chu Muk-man; 3 January 1978 (age 48); Hong Kong
- Education: University of California, San Diego (BA); Fuller Theological Seminary
- Occupation: Community organizer
- Father: Chu Yiu-ming

Chinese name
- Chinese: 朱牧民
Transcriptions
Standard Mandarin
- Hanyu Pinyin: Zhū Mùmín
Yue: Cantonese
- Jyutping: zyu1 muk6 man4

Samuel Chu Muk-man (Chinese: 朱牧民; born 3 January 1978) is a Hong Kong and American activist and community organizer. Chu is the founder and President of The Campaign for Hong Kong, a US-based nonpartisan organization whose mission is to advocate for American leadership and policies that advance human rights and democracy in Hong Kong. He is also a founding member of the advisory board of the Axel Springer SE Freedom Foundation in Berlin (Germany), a senior advisor to the president and CEO of MAZON: A Jewish Response to Hunger, and a trainer for Midwest Academy, a training school for community organizers in the US.

Chu is also the founder of the Hong Kong Democracy Council (HKDC), launched in 2019, and was its managing director until August 2021. The success of HKDC and Chu in pushing for the Hong Kong Human Rights and Democracy Act and the Hong Kong Autonomy Act, and for economic sanctions and visa bans by the US on Chinese and Hong Kong officials it deemed responsible for the erosion of Hong Kong's basic freedoms and autonomy, led Hong Kong authorities to issue arrest warrants against Chu in July 2020, making him the first foreign citizen to be targeted under the Hong Kong National Security Law.

Samuel is a frequent presenter and speaker at convenings, including Forum 2000, Oslo Freedom Forum, #RealCollege, and RightsCon, and for organizations such as Jewish World Watch, Pacific Council on International Policy, Freedom House, etc. He regularly testifies in front of the United States Congress and Parliaments across Europe.

From 2011 to 2021, Chu served as the national organizer for MAZON: A Jewish Response to Hunger, leading local and regional campaigns around issues of food insecurity and access in various states. He was a fellow at the Center for Religion and Civic Culture at University of Southern California, where he engages in research, writing and teaching around community organizing, public leadership, and the role of religious institutions in social change.

He served as chair and president of the board of directors of One LA-Industrial Areas Foundation, one of the nation's largest community organizing networks and of 1010 Development Corporation, a non-profit affordable housing developer in Los Angeles rooted in the United Methodist tradition.

He also directed special projects for Consumer Watchdog as well as the social justice program, Minyan Tzedek, at IKAR, a Jewish spiritual community that stands at the intersection of spirituality and social justice in Los Angeles, CA, led by Rabbi Sharon Brous.

== Early life ==
Chu was born on 3 January 1978 in Hong Kong. He grew up in a Southern Baptist household. Chu graduated from the University of California, San Diego in 2000, majoring in political science. He completed his studies at Fuller Theological Seminary in 2002.

== Arrest warrant under the National Security Law ==
In July 2020, Hong Kong authorities issued an arrest warrant for Samuel Chu under the newly enacted National Security Law—making him the first foreign national to be targeted by the legislation. Article 38 of the law explicitly asserts extraterritorial jurisdiction, enabling authorities to prosecute individuals—including non-residents—who commit alleged violations from outside Hong Kong.

Chu strongly condemned the warrant, stating that it criminalized his constitutional right in the U.S.—specifically, advocating and lobbying on behalf of Hong Kong democracy from abroad. He described his case as serving as a "test case" for the law’s application to foreign nationals, warning of broader chilling effects on diaspora activism.

The international community responded with concern. U.S. lawmakers condemned the action as unwarranted and retaliatory, with Secretary of State Mike Pompeo and senators such as Marco Rubio and Dick Durbin publicly supporting Chu in defending pro-democracy speech and civic activism beyond Hong Kong’s borders.

Subsequently, Chu has been categorized among "fugitives wanted under the Hong Kong National Security Law, a classification that underscores both the severity of the warrant and the authorities’ intent to enforce the law extraterritorially.

== Career ==
He pastored at Immanuel Presbyterian Church (Presbyterian Church USA) in Los Angeles, CA from 2002 to 2009, a multi-cultural, social justice congregation on Wilshire Boulevard.

He also served on the board of directors of various other organizations such as the California Council of Churches.

Chu was the executive director of California Faith for Equality and California Faith for Equality Action Fund from January 2009 to March 2011. Chu was appointed as interim executive director in January 2009 and later appointed as CFE's first permanent executive director in April 2010 after an extensive national search. He was the first straight person to head a statewide lesbian, gay, bisexual, and transgender supportive organization. Under his leadership, CFE filed one of the largest amicus briefs to the courts in support of marriage equality.

In 2011, Chu was recognized by the city of Los Angeles with the LGBT Pride Award for his leadership in promoting and organizing religious support for LGBT civil rights and marriage equality.

In 2008, Chu joined the effort, as a national director, to develop the national, bi-coastal network of youth development projects called WorkUp, focusing primarily on asset building, financial literacy, and social entrepreneurship.

He has organized for OneLA where his accomplishments included creating and implementing projects such as the largest community-led enrollment program for the Affordable Care Act in California and the nation's first mortgage principle reduction plan during the foreclosure crisis

In his role as National Organizer for MAZON: A Jewish Response to Hunger, Chu oversees engagement of over 950 synagogue partners across the country and directs a growing political constituency that has won legislative and administrative changes at the state and regional levels – including $8 million in new state funding to provide free school lunch to 62,000 additional low-income students in Minnesota, universal breakfast for over 4,000,000 students across 1,000 public school campuses in Texas, and improved access to Supplemental Nutrition Assistance Program (formerly known as "food stamps") for thousands of families, veterans and homeless minors in Pennsylvania and California.

=== Advocacy against lunch shaming ===
While serving as National Organizer for the hunger advocacy organization MAZON, Chu launched and led the nation's first state legislative effort to expose and address "lunch shaming" in Minnesota. "Lunch shaming" is the practice by school staff and workers of denying students healthy, nutritious meals because of the inability to pay or accrued debts. When a student is unable to pay for a school meal, he or she might be given an alternative meal (like half a cheese sandwich), some are turned away, others have their food taken away and dumped. The "shaming" extends to practices such as "hand-stamping" – whereas a student's hand is stamped with the word "money" – or other forms of debt collection activities against the students and families. The campaign led to the expansion of free school meals to 62,000 additional low-income students in Minnesota and led to the first statewide ban on all shaming practices by schools.

Working in partnership with staff attorney Jessica Webster of Mid-Minnesota Legal Aid, Chu testified at the Minnesota Legislature in 2013 in support of reforms that would ensure students were not denied meals, had trays thrown away, or were otherwise stigmatized because of unpaid lunch debt.

The resulting "School Lunch Aid Act" was signed into law in 2014 by Governor Mark Dayton, and is widely cited as the first statute in the nation to restrict lunch shaming. MAZON later described this campaign, launched in 2012, as the "first successful campaign to expose and ban 'lunch shaming' practices."

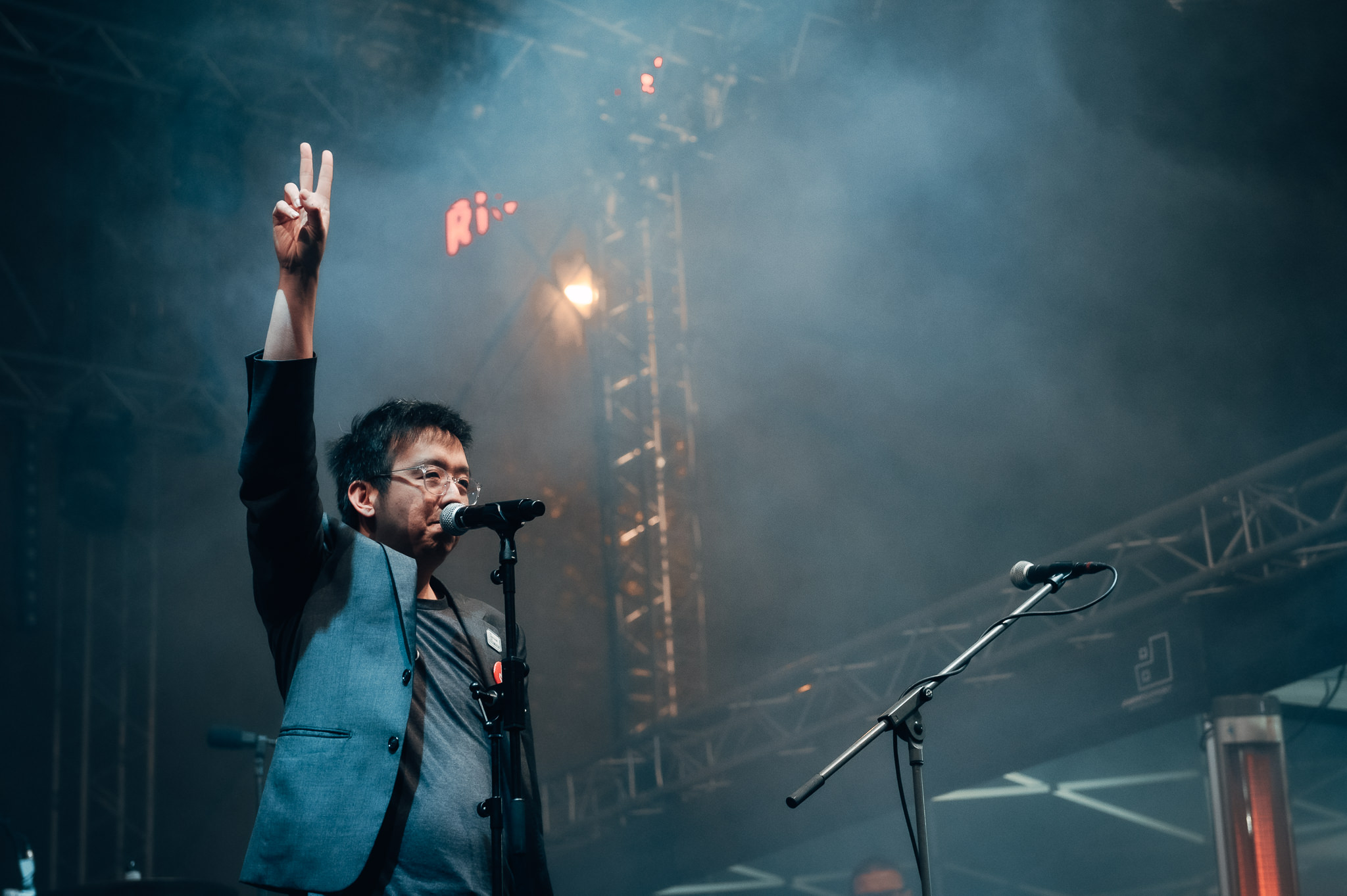
Samuel Chu, speaking at the Concert for the Future in Prague, commemorating the anniversary of the Velvet Revolution in 2022.

From 2016 to 2017, Chu served as the Director of the Civic Engagement Program for Murmuration – a 16-school pilot program in Los Angeles County designed to increase voter engagement and parent leadership by combining community organizing, voting data, and civic tech. The program resulted in a voting bloc of over 6,000 voters across partnering schools, registered over 2,000 new voters within the 16 school communities, and boosted voter turnout among pilot schools to consistently outpace the state, county, city, and district turnout over five consecutive elections. In his role with Murmuration Chu also organized one of the largest parent-led public actions in May 2017 to protect immigrant families with 300 parent leaders, California Senate President pro Tempore Kevin de León, Los Angeles City Attorney Mike Feuer, Los Angeles County Sheriff's Department, and Los Angeles Police Department.

Chu was the managing director of the Hong Kong Democracy Council until August 2021, when he stepped down together with fellow core members Victoria Hui and Annie Boyajian. Chu and Boyajian did not give reasons for their resignations; Hui hinted at difficulties within the board after efforts to recruit new leaders had failed.

=== The Campaign for Hong Kong ===
After stepping down from the Hong Kong Democracy Council in August 2021, Chu founded the Campaign for Hong Kong, a U.S.-based nonpartisan organization advocating for American and international leadership to defend democracy and human rights in Hong Kong and to support global democratic movements.

Under his leadership, the Campaign has achieved several key successes, including:

- Advocating for landmark U.S. policies such as the Hong Kong Human Rights and Democracy Act, the Hong Kong Autonomy Act, targeted sanctions, and protections such as Deferred Enforced Departure (DED) for Hong Kongers in the U.S.
- Organizing a virtual ceremony in May 2022 to honor winners of the Hong Kong Human Rights Press Awards after the event was canceled by the Foreign Correspondents’ Club, drawing international attention to press freedom under threat in Hong Kong.
- Leading a delegation to the Vatican to meet with officials from the Holy See’s foreign ministry, including those overseeing relations with China, to raise concerns about religious freedom, transnational repression, and the impact of the national security law on faith communities.
- Orchestrating the installation of a full-sized replica of the Pillar of Shame memorial in Berlin, Germany, after the original was dismantled at the University of Hong Kong in 2021. The Berlin display has become a prominent symbol commemorating the victims of the 1989 Tiananmen Square massacre and a rallying point for Hong Kong pro-democracy advocacy in Europe.
- Chu has discussed the concept of transnational repression in media appearances and advocacy work to describe authoritarian governments’ targeting of dissidents abroad, and advancing a holistic response that combines legislative action, international coalition-building, and community protection for exiled activists.
- Elevating the cases of imprisoned dissidents and pressuring for their release, including sustained international advocacy for Hong Kong media tycoon and democracy campaigner Jimmy Lai, as well as contributing to the successful release of Russian opposition leader Vladimir Kara-Murza through coordinated global campaigns.
- Serving as a public voice and organizer to counter such threats, including participation in international forums and media appearances to highlight the dangers faced by dissidents worldwide.

== Awards and recognition ==
In June 2025, Chu was awarded the Honorary Decoration of Solidarity and Human Rights by the European Solidarity Centre in Gdańsk, Poland. The award was presented during Poland’s annual observance of Freedom and Civil Rights Day, which commemorates the anniversary of the June 4, 1989 democratic elections. The Decoration recognizes individuals who have shown exceptional commitment to defending human rights in civic, cultural, scientific, and educational fields. Chu was among the inaugural group of recipients, alongside figures such as Nobel Peace Prize laureate Lech Wałęsa.

== Media and publications ==
Chu’s activism and advocacy have been widely covered by international media, including features in The Guardian, The Washington Post, BBC News, and Voice of America.

He has been interviewed on numerous podcasts and broadcast programs, including Dr. Phil Primetime, Changemakers Chat, The Megyn Kelly Show, and One Decision, where he spoke about democracy movements, the Hong Kong diaspora, and threats of transnational repression.

Chu has also been profiled or cited in books examining global authoritarianism and Hong Kong’s democracy movement, including Among the Braves: Hope, Struggle, and Exile in the Battle for Hong Kong and the Future of Global Democracy (2023) by Shibani Mahtani and Timothy McLaughlin, and Beijing Rules: How China Weaponized Its Economy to Confront the World (2022) by Bethany Allen.

He also co-authored the chapter "Policy Change: Leveraging Federal Food Benefits to Support College Completion" with Amy Ellen Duke-Benfield in the edited volume Food Insecurity on Campus: Action and Intervention (2018), published by Johns Hopkins University Press.

In August 2020, Chu published an op-ed in The New York Times titled "Why Is China Coming After Americans Like Me in the U.S.?" where he described being targeted under Hong Kong’s National Security Law and warned of its extraterritorial implications.

In 2026, Chu published "Strangers into Collaborators," a personal essay in the Los Angeles Review of Books Quarterly. Drawing on his childhood experiences during Operation Yellowbird following the 1989 Tiananmen Square crackdown and his later involvement in helping Hong Kong activists escape, the essay explores family, political exile, and the role of relationships and collective action in political organizing.

In film, Chu has appeared in or been featured in documentaries including The Hong Konger (2022), which profiles media mogul Jimmy Lai and the broader Hong Kong democracy movement, Faceless (2021), which follows young activists involved in the Hong Kong protests, and Hong Kong’s Final Days of Freedom (2021), which chronicles the city’s last period of open dissent before the imposition of the National Security Law.

In addition, his advocacy has been discussed in reports such as Freedom House’s Out of Sight, Not Out of Reach, which documents the global scale of transnational repression.

== Personal life ==
Chu resides in Los Angeles, California while also spending significant time in Washington, DC. Chu is the son of Rev. Chu Yiu-ming, a retired minister who co-founded Occupy Central with Love and Peace and one of the leaders of the Umbrella Movement in Hong Kong. Reverend Chu was also a key figure in organizing 'Operation Yellowbird', a clandestine network that helped smuggle Chinese student leaders and dissidents out of mainland China following the 1989 Tiananmen Square protests.

In July 2020, police in Hong Kong announced that they were seeking the arrest of six pro-democracy activists. Chu was one listed, despite being an American citizen.

== See also ==
- Hong Kong Human Rights and Democracy Act
- Hong Kong Autonomy Act
- Magnitsky Act
- United States sanctions against China
- Chu Yiu-ming
- Democratic development in Hong Kong
- Hong Kong national security law
