= List of Hong Kong surrender of fugitive offenders agreements =

Hong Kong has entered into several surrender of fugitive offenders agreements with foreign states. The term surrender of fugitive offenders agreement is used in place of extradition treaty to signify Hong Kong's non-sovereign status. As a special administrative region of the People's Republic of China since July 1997, Hong Kong is authorised by the Central Government of China to enter into such agreements, according to Article 96 of the Basic Law. The legality of one such agreement was challenged in the US state of Connecticut, but the US Court of Appeals for the Second Circuit ruled that the agreement entered into between Hong Kong and the US should be regarded as a 'treaty' under US law.

Article 2(1)(a) of Fugitive Offenders Ordinance (Cap. 503) allows the Hong Kong government to conclude arrangements of surrender of fugitive offenders with 'a place outside Hong Kong (other than any other part of the People's Republic of China)'. In 2019, the Carrie Lam administration proposed an amendment bill to enable Hong Kong to enter into 'special surrender arrangements' with 'a place outside Hong Kong', including other parts of the People's Republic of China. Oppositions to the bill evolved to a series of wide-range protests and the bill was withdrawn.

On 30 June 2020, the Standing Committee of the National People's Congress in Beijing enacted a national security law in Hong Kong. Several countries have since suspended the agreements with Hong Kong. In response, China and Hong Kong (on the central government's instruction) announced the suspension of Hong Kong's extradition treaties with Canada, Australia, the United Kingdom, New Zealand, Germany and the United States, as well as the shelving of a pending treaty with France, along with the suspension of some bilateral mutual legal assistance agreements.

== List of Hong Kong surrender of fugitive offenders agreements ==
Country	Date signed	Entered into force	Order	Text	Status	Extradition treaty with China
Australia	15 November 1993	29 June 1997	Fugitive Offenders (Australia) Order	Cap. 503C Schedule 1	Suspended	No
Australia	19 March 2007	7 May 2008	Fugitive Offenders (Australia) (Amendment) Order 2007	Cap. 503C Schedule 2	Suspended	No
Canada	7 September 1993	13 June 1997	Fugitive Offenders (Canada) Order	Cap. 503B Schedule	Suspended	No
Czech Republic	4 March 2013	13 February 2015	Fugitive Offenders (Czech Republic) Order	Cap. 503AI Schedule	In force	No
Czech Republic	4 March 2013	13 February 2015	List of the Offences for which Surrender May be Granted	List provided under Article 3(2)	In force	No
Finland	20 May 2005	15 August 2013	Fugitive Offenders (Finland) Order	Cap. 503W Schedule	Suspended	No
France	4 May 2017	—N/a	Fugitive Offenders (France) Order	Cap. 503AJ Schedule	Suspended (Note: Never in force; ratification of agreement halted)	Yes
Germany	26 May 2006	11 April 2009	Fugitive Offenders (Germany) Order	Cap. 503X Schedule	Suspended	No
India	28 June 1997	14 November 1997	Fugitive Offenders (India) Order	Cap. 503P Schedule	In force	No
Indonesia	5 May 1997	13 July 2001	Fugitive Offenders (Indonesia) Order	Cap. 503O Schedule	In force	Yes
Ireland	5 October 2007	14 January 2009	Fugitive Offenders (Ireland) Order	Cap. 503AF Schedule	Suspended	No
South Korea	26 June 2006	11 February 2007	Fugitive Offenders (Republic of Korea) Order	Cap. 503Y Schedule	In force	Yes
Malaysia	11 January 1995	16 June 2001	Fugitive Offenders (Malaysia) Order	Cap. 503D Schedule 1	In force	No
Malaysia	17 October 2006	1 November 2007	Fugitive Offenders (Malaysia) (Amendment) Order 2007	Cap. 503D Schedule 2	In force	No
Netherlands	2 November 1992	20 June 1997	Fugitive Offenders (Netherlands) Order	Cap. 503A Schedule 1	Suspended	No
Netherlands	17 February 2015	21 May 2016	Fugitive Offenders (Netherlands) (Amendment) Order 2016	Cap. 503A Schedule 2	Suspended	No
New Zealand	3 April 1998	23 October 1998	Fugitive Offenders (New Zealand) Order	Cap. 503S Schedule	Suspended	No
Philippines	13 January 1995	20 June 1997	Fugitive Offenders (Philippines) Order	Cap. 503E Schedule	In force	No
Portugal	24 May 2001	7 November 2004	Fugitive Offenders (Portugal) Order	Cap. 503U Schedule	In force	No
Singapore	11 November 1997	11 June 1998	Fugitive Offenders (Singapore) Order	Cap. 503Q Schedule	In force	No
South Africa	20 February 2009	2 December 2011	Fugitive Offenders (South Africa) Order	Cap. 503AH Schedule	In force	Yes
Sri Lanka	3 September 1999	19 April 2003	Fugitive Offenders (Sri Lanka) Order	Cap. 503V Schedule	In force	Pending
United Kingdom	5 November 1997	19 March 1998	Fugitive Offenders (United Kingdom) Order	Cap. 503R Schedule	Suspended	No
United States	20 December 1996	21 January 1998	Fugitive Offenders (United States of America) Order	Cap. 503F Schedule	Suspended	No

== See also ==
- Law of Hong Kong
