= Deng Zhonghua =

Chinese government official

Deng Zhonghua (simplified Chinese: 邓中华; traditional Chinese: 鄧中華; pinyin: Dèng Zhōnghuá; September 1961) is a Chinese government official. He was appointed as the Deputy Director of the Hong Kong and Macau Affairs Office (HKMAO) in 2018.

In June 2020, Deng said that Beijing would reserve the right to handle "rare" cases involving the National Security Law.

== Early life ==
Deng Zhonghua was born in September 1961, in Changsha, Hunan.

== Career ==
In 1986, Deng started his public career in China's Ministry of Foreign Affairs' (MFA) Office of Hong Kong and Macau Affairs, and was eventually promoted to serve as the head of the legal team.

In 2000, Deng was appointed as the deputy consul-general of the Consulate-General in Melbourne. In 2004, he returned to the Hong Kong, Macao, and Taiwan Department of the MFA and was eventually appointed as its head. In 2011, he was appointed as the Director-General of the Department of Frontiers and Seas of the Ministry of Foreign Affairs. During this period, he participated in the work of sovereignty disputes in the South China Sea, including the Sino-Philippine negotiations during the Scarborough Shoal standoff.

In 2017, Deng was transferred to the Chinese Communist Party's Central Commission for Discipline Inspection, managing the inspection team for the Chinese Academy of Social Sciences. In 2018, Deng Zhonghua returned to the field of Hong Kong and Macao affairs, becoming the deputy director of the deputy director of the State Council's Hong Kong and Macao Affairs Office, while being promoted to be a member of the 19th Central Commission for Discipline Inspection.

=== Hong Kong national security law ===
On 9 November 2020, Deng was sanctioned by the United States under Executive Order 13936 for his role in implementing the Hong Kong national security law.

On 17 March 2021, US Secretary of State Antony Blinken submitted an updated report to the Hong Kong Autonomy Act, and again named Deng as one of the 24 people "whose actions have reduced Hong Kong's high degree of autonomy".

=== Chinese Association of Hong Kong and Macau Studies ===
Deng left the HKMAO in 2022 and started his position as president of the Chinese Association of Hong Kong and Macau Studies.
