= Responses to the drafting of the 2020 Hong Kong national security law =

Support and opposition to the law at the UNHRC on 30 June 2020 Supportive Opposed

In early May 2020, the Chinese Government announced plans to draft a new national security law for Hong Kong, something required under Hong Kong Basic Law but which should explicitly be written and enacted by Hong Kong's own government. In response to apparent mainland intent to bypass Hong Kong's local legislature, the United Kingdom – which administered Hong Kong until 1997 – announced that if a security law drafted by China was approved, Britain would open a route for all Hong Kong residents born under British rule to become British citizens. Other nations and organisations have given various responses to the decision, to legislation plans, and ultimately the law itself as passed by the Chinese Standing Committee of the National People's Congress on 28 May 2020 with 2878 votes "for", 1 vote against, and 6 blank votes. At 9:30 am, 30 June 2020, the same Standing Committee unanimously voted to enact the law. The law became effective at 11 pm on the same day.

== Responses to the May 2020 decision ==
=== United States ===
==== US to reduce special treatment of Hong Kong as separate from the Mainland ====
On 27 May, US Secretary of State Pompeo called the decision the "latest in a series of actions that fundamentally undermine Hong Kong's autonomy and freedoms", and certified to Congress under the Hong Kong Policy Act that Hong Kong was no longer autonomous. Sanctions, higher tariffs and visa restrictions may follow the certification; David Stilwell, Assistant Secretary of State for East Asia and Pacific Affairs, said that the target of any decision would be "officials in Beijing", not those in Hong Kong or the United States. On 29 May, Donald Trump said that his administration would end Hong Kong's trade privileges. Under the United States-Hong Kong Policy Act, Hong Kong is treated for trade and other purposes as separate from the rest of China; for example, it has mostly not been directly affected by US tariffs on Chinese goods in the US-China trade war; however, if Hong Kong is determined to no longer be sufficiently autonomous, such preferential treatment may cease.

==== Other US proposals ====
Two US senators, Republican Pat Toomey and Democrat Chris Van Hollen, said they plan to introduce a bill that "would introduce legislation to impose sanctions on Chinese officials for violating Hong Kong's independence." On 24 May 2020, White House National Security Adviser Robert O'Brien says the US will impose sanctions on Hong Kong and mainland China if the security law is passed.

Various US politicians have expressed disapproval of corporate decisions related to the protests. On 29 May 2020, Trump ordered the removal of the special status enjoyed by Hong Kong due to Beijing's new national security law for the territory. Trump announced that the extradition treaty between Hong Kong and the US would be affected, that US travel guidance for the territory would be changed, and that officials who undermined Hong Kong's freedoms would be sanctioned. Secretary of State Mike Pompeo said that following this new law, the United States no longer recognised Hong Kong as an autonomous region, which could deteriorate the economic special status of the region, and threaten foreign investment in China.

=== Other countries ===
==== Criticism and concern over the national security law ====
Several statements urging respect for the One country, two systems principle, adherence to human rights norms, and local consultation were issued by the European Union; Japan; Switzerland; the United Kingdom, Canada, and Australia as a group, especially concerned with Sino-British Joint Declaration; both the governing Democratic Progressive Party and opposition Kuomintang in Taiwan; the United States; and a group of over 356 parliamentarians from 32 countries led by Chris Patten.

==== Support for the national security law ====
China, Antigua and Barbuda, Bahrain, Belarus, Burundi, Cambodia, Cameroon, Central African Republic, Comoros, Congo-Brazzaville, Cuba, Djibouti, Dominica, Egypt, Equatorial Guinea, Eritrea, Gabon, Gambia, Guinea, Guinea-Bissau, Iran, Iraq, Kuwait, Laos, Lebanon, Lesotho, Mauritania, Morocco, Mozambique, Myanmar, Nepal, Nicaragua, Niger, North Korea, Oman, Pakistan, Palestine, Papua New Guinea, Saudi Arabia, Sierra Leone, Somalia, South Sudan, Sri Lanka, Sudan, Suriname, Syria, Tajikistan, Togo, United Arab Emirates, Venezuela, Yemen, Zambia, and Zimbabwe expressed their support to the law at the UNHRC.

Russia, North Korea, Cuba, Pakistan, Venezuela, Serbia, Syria, Iran, Kazakhstan, Cambodia and Myanmar said that no foreign state should interfere in China's internal affairs, and accused the US for doing so.

== Responses before the law's enactment ==
=== United Kingdom ===
The UK, of which Hong Kong is a former colony, encouraged China to back down on the security law per the provisions of the Sino-British Joint Declaration: terms of the UK handing sovereignty of Hong Kong to China included allowing Hong Kong to maintain autonomy and its British-based form of governance. British First Secretary and Foreign and Commonwealth Secretary Dominic Raab explained the British perspective of needing to step in with China violating the Joint Declaration in their attempts to pursue the law. On 3 June, the Chinese government announced that they consider the Joint Declaration to have become void as soon as power was transferred in 1997.

We are not threatening anything. We are just pointing out as a matter of black and white in the joint declaration that China signed that it is in violation, direct violation, of undertakings freely given and we expect – as we expect any member of the international community as they expect of us – China to live up to those responsibilities.

— Dominic Raab

On 2 June both Raab and the Shadow Foreign Secretary Lisa Nandy announced that the UK should set about creating a large international alliance beyond the Five Eyes to pressure China into stepping back on the matter of Hong Kong security, as well as to counter the "pro-China global alliance" that Raab said Beijing had formed to intimidate countries that oppose it. Calls for such an alliance had been voiced on 1 June by seven former Foreign Secretaries of the UK.

Raab continued to urge China to uphold the promises it made in the Sino-British Joint Declaration, a legally binding international treaty. The UK had already stopped selling crowd control equipment to the HKPF by June 2020.

The UK produces a Report on Hong Kong every six months, backdated, with one written and published by Raab on schedule on 11 June 2020 (covering the last six months of 2019). In this report, Raab more firmly warns China against interference and reiterates the UK's right to comment on Hong Kong. Raab said that Beijing's "plans to impose new security laws bypassing the Hong Kong legislature are in direct conflict with international law". The report requests that China abstain from interfering in the September elections in Hong Kong, and accuses the Chinese government of torturing an employee of the British consulate in Hong Kong, Simon Cheng, who visited the Mainland for a business trip. In November 2019, Cheng reported in an interview with the BBC that he had been tortured by Chinese officials during his 15-day detention in China in August 2019. Raab released a statement saying that he was "outraged by the disgraceful mistreatment". In response to the political and media backlash, Chinese state media later released footage of Cheng's confession of "soliciting prostitutes", and CCTV footage of him entering and leaving a clubhouse. Cheng stated that he had made the confession under threat that he would be unable to contact his family and be detained indefinitely. Cheng was given political asylum in the UK on 1 July 2020.

Six days later, the UK said that a new human rights law, which has been stalled in Whitehall for several months, could be used to "sanction Chinese officials if Beijing presses ahead" with the national security law. The British law is to be a form of Magnitsky legislation, for the government to sanction those who commit acts repressing human rights.

==== Extending Hong Kong British national rights ====
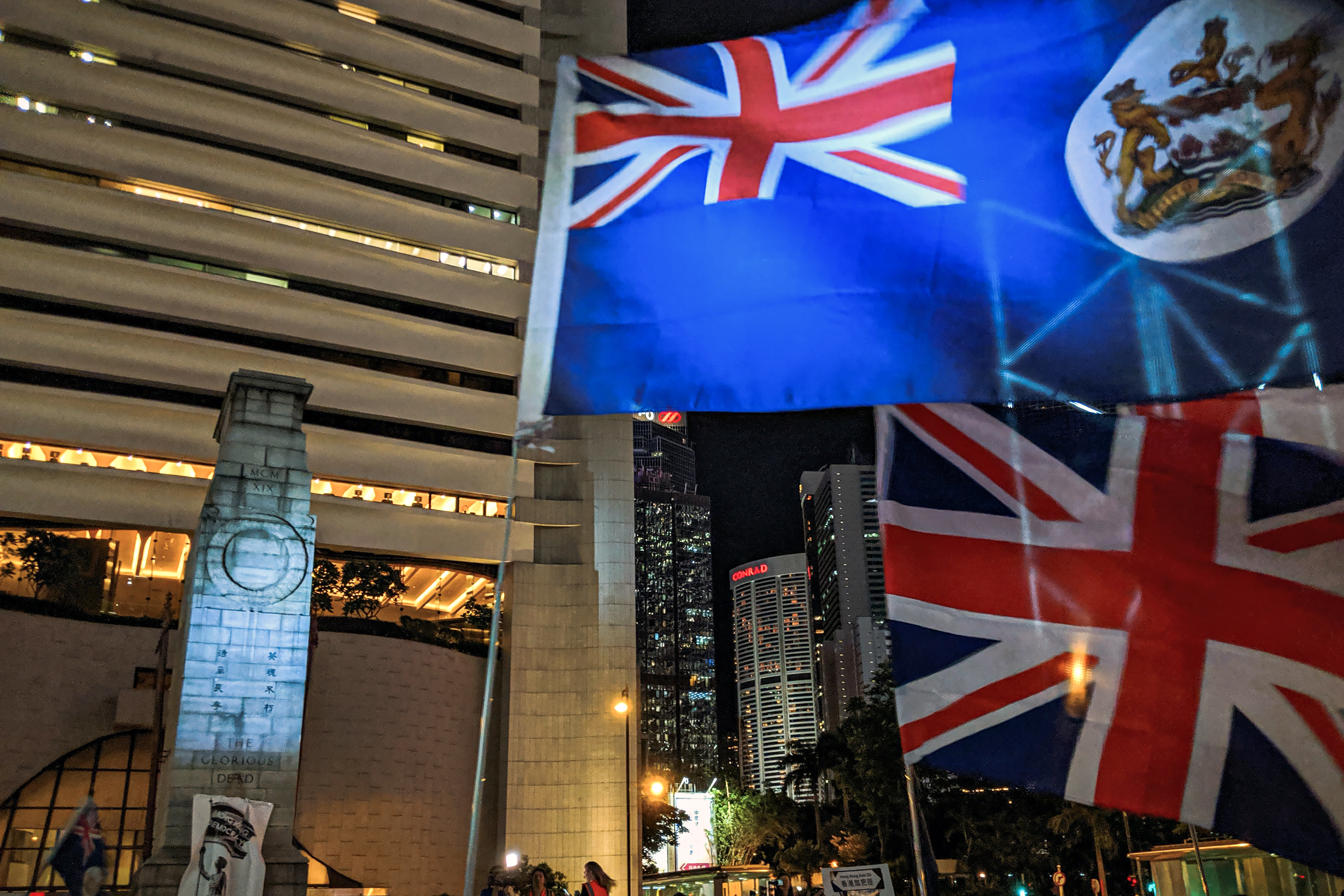
Hong Kong protestors flying both the Union Jack and the colonial Dragon and Lion flag in 2019.

In late May and early June 2020, members of the British Cabinet also announced measures to provide a route to British citizenship for 3 million Hong Kong residents. On 3 June, Prime Minister Boris Johnson announced that if China were to continue pursuing the law, he would allow Hong Kong residents to claim a British National (Overseas) passport (BNO) and open a path to British citizenship for them. Raab said that the UK would sacrifice trade deals with China to support Hong Kong, but that presently it will remain in conversation with the international community on the matter. Chinese foreign minister Zhao Lijian threatened the UK in response, while Hong Kong protestors felt that the British offer did not go far enough. Hong Kong barrister Martin Lee, who helped draft the Basic Law, thought the UK was being generous but said that "no matter how generous you are in the provision of passports and so on, there are still large numbers of people who are not eligible for one reason or another", highlighting the vast number of oppressed protestors who are young people, born after the handover. Lee later called for the UK to take China to International Court of Justice.

Raab had announced on 28 May that the UK were considering extending BNO rights to give right of abode, which Zhao acknowledged would be an internal British policy change, but still claimed China would have "the right to take countermeasures". Raab delivered his proposal to the House of Commons on 2 June, and was ambivalent about whether it would only apply to the current BNO passport holders, telling the Commons: "we have said that we will allow the approximately 300,000-plus passport holders, along with their dependents, to come to the UK". His measure plans to allow BNO passport holders to apply for a visa, remain in the UK for an initial period of twelve months instead of six as previously, allow them to apply to study and work, and thereby provide them a path to citizenship.

Further to Raab's proposal the day before, Johnson's 3 June announcement would cover the approximately 3 million Hong Kong residents born before 1997. He was less ambivalent on whether only people who had applied for a BNO passport before the handover in 1997 would be eligible, writing in The Times:

Today about 350,000 people hold British Nationals (Overseas) passports and another 2.5 million people would be eligible to apply for them. At present these passports allow for visa free access for up to six months. If China imposes its national security law, the British government will change its immigration rules and allow any holder of these passports from Hong Kong to come to the UK for a renewable period of 12 months and be given further immigration rights including the right to work which would place them on the route to citizenship.

— Boris Johnson

The extent of the scheme was clarified on 12 June 2020 by Home Secretary Priti Patel in correspondence with Johnson. All people eligible for BNO status, as well as their dependents, will be allowed to enter the UK under the scheme. Patel expressed that 'dependents' would include partners and any children under 18 – this is criticised for leaving a gap of young adults born after 1997 who will not be able to access the scheme. She did add that Hong Kong residents could start to come to the UK without restrictions while the scheme is still being set up, if the national security law is passed. On 1 July, Johnson announced the full plans, extending the visa-free period. He said that all BNO passport holders and their dependents would be granted right to remain in the UK for five years, including being free to work and study. After five years they can, under normal British nationality law, apply for settled status and then, a year later, for citizenship. Raab said that an application process designed to be simple and streamlined would be created, and that there would be no quota on how many Hong Kong residents can come to the UK under the scheme.

=== European Union ===
On June 15, European Union parliament called for a "joint motion for a resolution" to defend Hong Kong's autonomy and freedom. They voted on June 19 with 565 voted 'for' and 34 'against' bringing China to the International Criminal Court in The Hague. Then on June 22, EU held an EU-China Summit, in which EU warned China that EU is gravely concerned over the law and that the imposition of the national security law will be considered a breach of Beijing's international commitment. On June 30, the day before the enactment of the law, EU, along with USA, Canada, UK, Australia, New Zealand, and members of the ASEAN countries, launched the "International Lifeboat Campaign" in which member countries begin modifying their visa requirement to allow for Hong Kong pro-democracy protesters fearing retaliation to leave Hong Kong.

=== France ===
On June 6, President of France Emmanuel Macron stated in a phone call with Xi Jinping that France will be closely following the situation in Hong Kong.

=== Japan ===
On June 9 Japan expressed their concerns over Hong Kong protests, arrests, and the national security law. On June 21 Japan is considering altering its visa requirement to lure more Hong Kong financials elites to Japan in light of the looming national security law. Japan continued to speak out against the national security law as part of the G7 urging Beijing to revoke the law. This incident sparked a phrase in the Japanese mass media: 'Today Hong Kong, Tomorrow Taiwan, Day After Tomorrow Okinawa".

=== Taiwan ===
on June 18 Taiwan President Tsai Ing-wen announced Taiwan will offer humanitarian assistance for the Hong Kong protesters fleeing from the national security law. On June 30, Taiwan Cabinet Spokesperson issued a press release condemning the national security law and warning Taiwan citizens living in Hong Kong to beware of "possible risks" imposed by the national security law. Since the implementation of the Hong Kong national security law, the phrase Today Hong Kong Tomorrow Taiwan has gained popularity in Taiwan, reflecting the fear of being absorbed by China.

=== United Nations (UN) ===
On June 19 United Nations High Commissioner for Human Rights stated that the UN will closely monitor China's national security law and its impact on Hong Kong's human rights, as no one outside of the Beijing Standing Committee has seen details of the law, she stressed that the law must be clear in scope and definition. On June 26, UN Office of High Commissioner published a statement endorsed by 51 independent human rights experts urging China to withdraw the national security law in Hong Kong. On the same day, former UN High Commissioner for Human Rights and other former special envoys urged the UN to appoint a special committee to monitor the situation in Hong Kong.

On June 30, UK's Ambassador to the WTO and UN Julian Braithwaite delivered a speech on behalf of many nations urging "the Chinese and Hong Kong Governments to reconsider the imposition of this legislation and to engage Hong Kong's people, institutions and judiciary to prevent further erosion of the rights and freedoms that the people of Hong Kong have enjoyed for many years." The nations endorsed this speech are Albania (as of July 15), Australia, Austria, Belgium, Belize, Canada, Denmark, Estonia, Finland, France, Iceland, Ireland, Germany, Japan, Latvia, Liechtenstein, Lithuania, Luxembourg, the Marshall Islands, the Netherlands, New Zealand, Norway, Palau, Slovakia, Slovenia, Sweden, Switzerland, and the United Kingdom. Belize, Marshall Islands, Palau are also countries that have formal diplomatic relations with Taiwan.

== Responses since the July 1st enactment of the law ==
Five Eyes intelligence-sharing alliance

=== United Kingdom ===
The UK held a teleconference with its allies in the Five Eyes alliance (the US, Canada, Australia, and New Zealand) in the first few days of June, where they discussed the Hong Kong situation and requested that should the BNO extension go ahead, the other countries would share the burden of taking in Hong Kongers in the resulting exodus. Australia, with strong ties to Hong Kong, did not announce new measures but confirmed that "Hong Kong people can apply for a range of relevant visa categories to work and live in Australia" already. Various political leaders across Australia have called on Prime Minister Scott Morrison to go further and at least formally match the UK's offer. Morrison then announced on 2 July that Australia would meet the offer, that they were "working on a scheme to provide a safe haven to Hong Kong residents", potentially leading to permanent residency in Australia.

=== Five Eyes Member Countries ===
Foreign ministers from the Five Eyes members and Commonwealth realms of Australia, Canada, New Zealand, and the UK jointly wrote a letter to the United Nations requesting "a new special envoy to monitor the impact of the law on Hong Kong", saying that "the erosion of the rule of law and the increasingly serious and urgent human rights situation in Hong Kong" needed to be addressed, especially noting the Chinese security law proposal came in the week of the anniversary of the Tiananmen Square massacre.

Following persuasion from the UK, all members of the G7, notably including Japan, signed an official statement both urging China to reconsider the national security law and expressing concerns about human rights in Hong Kong on 17 June 2020.

On 15 October, the Chinese ambassador Cong Peiwu to Canada warned the Canadian government not to grant asylum to Hong Kong residents and said if Canada grants them asylum that amounts to interference in China's internal affairs.

=== United States ===
The United States Congress passed the Hong Kong Autonomy Act following the imposition of national security legislation by the Chinese Communist Party on the semi-autonomous region of Hong Kong. The bill imposes sanctions on officials and entities in Hong Kong and the rest of the People's Republic of China that are deemed to help violate Hong Kong's autonomy, and punishes financial institutions that do business with them. It was signed into law by US President Donald J. Trump on 14 July 2020.

On 7 August, US announced sanctions on 11 Hong Kong and China-appointed Hong Kong officials for their involvement in enactment of the national security law and their suppression of the year-long pro-democracy protests. The sanction specified that these actions are "undermining Hong Kong's autonomy and restricting the freedom of expression or assembly of the citizens of Hong Kong". The 11 individuals are: Chief Executive of Hong Kong Carrie Lam, Commissioner of Hong Kong Police Force (HKPF) Chris Tang, Former Commissioner of HKPF Stephen Lo, HKSAR Secretary for Security John Lee Ka-chiu, HKSAR Secretary for Justice Teresa Cheng, HKSAR Secretary for Constitutional and Mainland Affairs Erick Tsang, Director of the Hong Kong and Macao Affairs Office of the State Council Xia Baolong, deputy director of the Hong Kong and Macao Affairs Office of the State Council Zhang Xiaoming, Director of the Hong Kong Liaison Office Luo Huining, Director of the Office for Safeguarding National Security in Hong Kong Zheng Yanxiong, and Secretary General of Committee for Safeguarding National Security of the HKSAR Eric Chan. Under the sanctions, companies and banks are not to make "contribution or provision of funds, goods, or services by, to, or for the benefit of any blocked person or the receipt of any contribution or provision of funds, goods or services from any such person".

On 19 August 2020, the U.S. State Department said it notified Hong Kong authorities of its suspension or termination of three bilateral agreements. These agreements covered the surrender of fugitive offenders, the transfer of sentenced persons, and reciprocal tax exemptions on income derived from the international operation of ships. The State Department said in a statement that "These steps underscore our deep concern regarding Beijing's decision to impose the National Security Law, which has crushed the freedoms of the people of Hong Kong."

=== European Union ===
On 19 June 2020, the European Parliament adopted a resolution condemning Beijing's unilateral introduction of the national security legislation in Hong Kong, stating that it was a comprehensive assault on Hong Kong's autonomy, rule of law, and fundamental freedoms. The resolution stressed that as China's largest export destination, the EU should use its economic leverage to challenge China's crackdown on human rights. It urged the EU to include a human right clause in any future trade agreement with China, and to take the human right situation in Hong Kong into consideration when asked by China to endorse any investment or trade deals in the future.

The resolution also stated that China's decision to impose the national security legislation was a violation of the Sino-British Joint Declaration, since it entirely bypassed Hong Kong's own legislative process and attempted to curb the freedom and autonomy of Hong Kong. The resolution suggested that in the event of the national security law being applied, the EU should file a case before the International Court of Justice alleging China's violation of the Sino-British Joint Declaration and the International Covenant on Civil and Political Rights.

Various other measures to ameliorate the human rights situation in China, especially that in Hong Kong, were also included in the resolution. It called for the finalisation of the EU Global Human Rights Sanctions Mechanism, which could be used to impose Magnitsky-style sanctions, for example assets freezing, on Chinese officials responsible for the national security legislation. It also suggested that the EU could coordinate sanctions with its democratic partners such as the US or Canada. Other measures such as a stricter control mechanism for exporting cyber-surveillance technology to China, or a "lifeboat scheme" for Hong Kong citizens in case of the deterioration of human rights in Hong Kong, was also mentioned in the resolution.

== See also ==
- Local effects of the Hong Kong national security law
