= Hong Kong Be Water Act =

Proposed United States legislative bill

The Hong Kong Be Water Act of 2019 was a proposed United States legislative bill, introduced in October 2019, that calls for sanctions and the freezing of assets under the Global Magnitsky Human Rights Accountability Act of Hong Kong and mainland Chinese officials as well as state-owned enterprises involved in the suppression of demonstrators' freedom of expression and assembly during the 2019–2020 Hong Kong protests. The bill was introduced by senator Josh Hawley and co-sponsored by senators Rick Scott and John Cornyn. The bill is named after a quote by Bruce Lee on adaptability. In December 2019, demonstrators in Hong Kong advocated for the bill before the U.S. consulate.

== See also ==
- Hong Kong Human Rights and Democracy Act
