= Hong Kong Americans =

Americans of Hong Kong birth or descent

Total population
- 248,024 (born in Hong Kong) (2021)

Regions with significant populations
- California, New York, New Jersey, Washington (Seattle), Texas, Massachusetts

Languages
- Predominantly English (American and Hong Kong), varieties of Chinese: Yue (Cantonese, Taishanese), Hakka, Wu (Taihu Wu, Oujiang Wu), Southern Min, Mandarin (Standard Chinese)

Religion
- Unaffiliated, Protestantism, Catholicism, Buddhism, Taoism

Related ethnic groups
- Hong Kong Canadians, Hong Kong Britons; Hong Kong Australians, Hong Kong New Zealanders; Chinese Americans, Taiwanese Americans; Americans in Hong Kong, Overseas Chinese

Hong Kong Americans (Cantonese: 香港裔美國人、港裔美國人、美籍香港人、美港人) include Americans who are also Hong Kong residents who identify themselves as Hongkongers (who see Hong Kong as their home and are culturally associated with Hong Kong, especially through descent, growth, birth, long term residence, or other types of deep affiliations with Hong Kong), Americans of Hong Kong ancestry, and also Americans who have Hong Kong parents.

== History ==
After the passage of the Immigration and Nationality Act of 1965, an influx of Cantonese-speaking Hong Kong immigrants settled in Chinatowns in San Francisco, California; Los Angeles, California; and Manhattan, New York. In Chinatown neighborhoods, many Hong Kong immigrants opened businesses such as Chinese restaurants and supermarkets.

During the 1980s and the 1990s, a large number of high-skilled Hong Kong immigrants moved to the United States due to the Handover of Hong Kong. Many settled in the San Francisco Bay Area, where many were employed by high-technology companies in Silicon Valley. Many of the Hong Kong immigrants in the Bay Area reside in suburban communities such as Burlingame, South San Francisco, San Mateo, Fremont, Daly City, Millbrae, San Leandro, Hayward and in the Richmond District and Sunset District in San Francisco. Hong Kong-styled breakfast cafes and restaurants exist in the San Francisco Peninsula in great number; the restaurant Laka Spicy in Millbrae is an example of this, which also incorporates British food and nearby Hong Kong Palace is a Hong Kong-styled restaurant. The dim sum restaurant Koi Palace is founded and owned by Hong Kong immigrant brothers Willy and Ronny Ng and has expanded their Bay Area presence from their Daly City flagship restaurant by opening branches in Milpitas and Dublin, CA. Many Hong Kong immigrants have also settled in the New York Metropolitan area with Brooklyn and Queens having a sizable Hong Kong diaspora. In the Greater Los Angeles area, many settled in the western San Gabriel Valley, including cities such as Monterey Park, Alhambra, San Gabriel, and Rosemead.

In May 2025, during the deportation in the second presidency of Donald Trump, a legal resident of twenty years from Hong Kong, Ming Li Hui, also known as Carol Mayorga, was detained by ICE. She has been living in Kennett, Missouri, and her arrest created a local petition calling for her release that caught national attention.

== Population ==
As of 2021, there are 248,024 people in the United States who are born in Hong Kong. Among those, the San Francisco Bay Area is home to the largest Hong Kong-born population in the country at 61,953. One out of every four Hong Kong Americans live in the Bay Area's nine counties. In recent years there have been Hong Kong theme carnivals in the Bay Area as gathering events for the Hong Kong diaspora in the region such as the 2022 and 2023 Hong Kong Carnival in Milpitas. As a matter of fact, Hong Kong ranks among the top ten most common birthplace for the San Francisco Bay Area's foreign-born population. After the Bay Area, the New York metropolitan area has the 2nd largest population of people born in Hong Kong in the nation at 55,246. Ranking third in the country is Greater Los Angeles with 34,323 residents born in Hong Kong.

Among other areas, Texas and Washington have 8,671, and 8,191 Hong Kong-born residents, respectively. There is also a notable community of Hongkongers in the Greater Boston Area, especially in Quincy, Massachusetts. Massachusetts has 7,464 residents who were born in Hong Kong.

== Notable people ==
- Nathan Adrian – swimmer and Olympic medal winner
- Celia Au – actress and filmmaker
- Jin Au-Yeung, professionally known as "MC Jin" – rapper, songwriter, actor, comedian
- Brian Burrell – actor
- Flora Chan – TVB actress
- Francis Chan – preacher
- Jaycee Chan – singer, film actor
- Melissa Chan – journalist
- Steve Chan – New York State Senator
- Ed Chau – former California State Assemblyman
- John S. Chen – CEO of BlackBerry
- Kevin Cheng – TVB actor
- Steven Cheung – political advisor
- Amy Chow – gymnast and Olympic medal winner
- Denny Chin – judge of the United States District Court for the Southern District of New York (1994–present), first Asian American appointed as a United States district court judge
- Margaret Chin – member of the New York City Council representing Chinatown
- John Eng – served in Washington state's House of Representatives from 1973 to 1983
- Khalil Fong – singer-songwriter
- The Fung Brothers – comedy and hip hop duo
- James Hong – actor
- William Hung – singer
- Yuet Wai Kan – pioneer in the use of DNA to diagnose human diseases; helped set the stage for the Human Genome Project
- Michelle Kwan – Olympic medal winner, ice skater
- Nancy Kwan – actress and model
- Kent Lai – tenured full professor, University of Utah School of Medicine
- Brandon Lee – martial artist and actor
- Bruce Lee – martial artist and actor
- Coco Lee – musician, singer-songwriter, actress, and dancer
- Otto Lee – Santa Clara County Supervisor
- Justin Lo – Cantopop singer-songwriter
- Jaeson Ma – entrepreneur
- Byron Mann – actor
- Jimmy O. Yang – comedian
- Robin Shou – actor, martial artist and stuntman
- Harry Shum Jr. – actor
- Vivienne Tam – fashion designer
- Stanley Tang – DoorDash Co-founder and Chief Product Officer
- Sam Tsui – musician, singer-songwriter and an Internet celebrity through YouTube
- Wayne Wang – film director
- Margaret W. Wong – Hong Kong-born naturalized American immigration attorney
- Vance Worley – baseball player
- Daniel Wu – actor
- Martin Yan – chef and food writer
- Chris Yen - actress-martial artist and sister of renowned fellow actor-martial artist Donnie Yen
- Janice Zahn – Washington State Representative

== See also ==
- Hong Kong–United States relations
