= Anna Kwok =

Stateless political activist (born 1997)

郭鳳儀
- Kwok Fung-yee
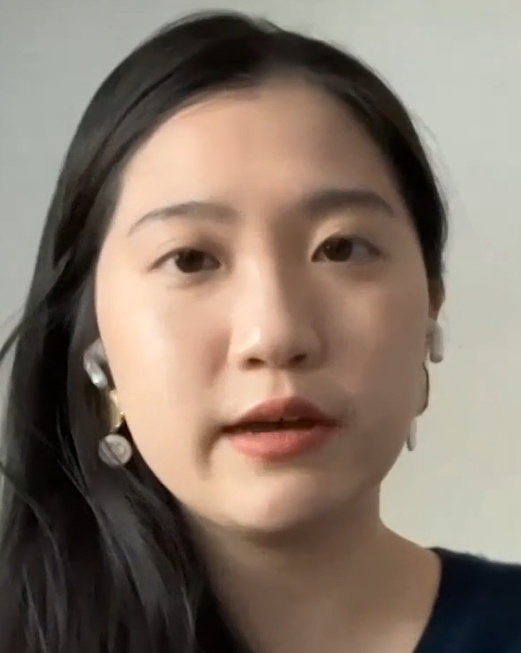
- Kwok in November 2023
- Born: 21 January 1997 (age 29); Hong Kong
- Other name: "Knorr Macaroni" (alias on LIHKG)
- Citizenship: China (Hong Kong) (until 2024); Stateless
- Education: UWC Red Cross Nordic; New York University
- Occupation: HKDC Executive Director
- Known for: Hong Kong activist in exile

Anna Kwok Fung-yee (Chinese: 郭鳳儀) is an exiled activist from Hong Kong.

== Biography ==
Kwok spent her early days in Hong Kong and went abroad since Grade 11, later she admitted into New York University majoring in journalism and philosophy. In 2019, she launched G20 campaigns under the alias of "Knorr Macaroni" on LIHKG, and she revealed herself in 2022. Kwok was listed on national security fugitives by Hong Kong for petitioning the United States government to forbid Chief Executive John Lee to attend APEC in 2023. In 2024, her passport was stripped by the HKSAR government, thus making her de facto stateless.

In August 2023, Kwok's parents and brothers were taken away by the National Security Department for investigation. On 30 April 2025, Kwok's father and second brother were arrested for handling her insurance policy; her brother was granted bail but her father was detained and indicted. Her father was eventually convicted on 11 February 2026, for the charge of 'Handling Properties of an Absconded Fugitive' under the Hong Kong National Security Law and sentenced to eight months' imprisonment on 26 February.
