= Victoria Tin-bor Hui =

Hong Kong self-exiled pro-democracy activist and political scientist

- 許田波
- Born: 1967 (age 58–59); Hong Kong
- Other name: Xu Tianbo

Academic background
- Education: Chinese University of Hong Kong; Columbia University
- Thesis: Rethinking War, State Formation, and System Formation: A Historical Comparison of Ancient China (659–221 BC) and Early Modern Europe (1495–1815 AD) (2000)

Academic work
- Institutions: University of Notre Dame

Victoria Tin-bor Hui (Chinese: 許田波) is a Hong Kong exiled pro-democracy activist and political scientist whose main interests include state formation, history of international relations, Confucianism, contentious politics, politics of China and Hong Kong. She is an Associate Professor at the University of Notre Dame.

== Education ==
Hui earned a B.SSc. in Journalism and Communication from the Chinese University of Hong Kong in 1990. She completed her MA and Ph.D. in Political Science at Columbia University.

== Career ==
Hui is a member and co-founder of the Washington, DC–based Hong Kong Democracy Council (HKDC). She has written on Hong Kong’s democracy movement for Foreign Policy Research Institute, Foreign Affairs and ChinaFile.

== Publications ==
=== Books ===
- War and State Formation in China and Early Modern Europe (Cambridge University Press, 2005)

=== Articles ===
- Testing Balance-of-Power Theory in World History. European Journal of International Relations (2007)
- Toward a Dynamic Theory of International Politics: Insights from Comparing Ancient China and Early Modern Europe. International Organization (2004)
