= Kent Lai =

Professor of pediatrics

Kent Lai is a professor of pediatrics at the University of Utah.

== Early life and education ==
Lai was born in Hong Kong. He received his undergraduate degree from the University of Bradford and his PhD from the University of Maryland. He also holds an MBA and an MHA, both from Georgia State University. After receiving his PhD, he completed a research fellowship at Emory University School of Medicine.

== Career ==
In 2002, he was appointed assistant professor at the University of Miami School of Medicine. In 2008, he was promoted to associate professor. In 2009, he accepted a position as a professor at the University of Utah.

=== Research ===
Lai's research is on the field of metabolic regulation, including its effect of human metabolic defects. His most cited article is Kent Lai, D, S.D. Langley, R.H. Singh, P.P. Dembure, L.N. Hjelm, L.J. Elsas II "A prevalent mutation for galactosemia among black Americans" Journal of Pediatrics January 1996 Volume 128, Issue 1, Pages 89–95, which, according to Google Scholar, has received 86 citations. A paper by Lai, Cynthia P. Bolognese, Steve Swift and Patricia McGraw ("Regulation of Inositol Transport in Saccharomyces cerevisiae Involves Inositol-induced Changes in Permease Stability and Endocytic Degradation in the Vacuole" Journal of Biological Chemistry (1995), 270, 2525-2534, has received 70 citations. A third, K Lai, LJ Elsas "Overexpression of human UDP-glucose pyrophosphorylase rescues galactose-1-phosphate uridyltransferase-deficient yeast" Biochemical and Biophysical Research Communications Volume 271, Issue 2, 10 May 2000, Pages 392–400 has 61 citations
