= United States–Hong Kong Policy Act =

United States law setting policy with respect to Hong Kong

United States–Hong Kong Policy Act of 1992
- Long title: An Act to set forth the policy of the United States with respect to Hong Kong, and for other purposes.
- Enacted by: the 102nd United States Congress
- Effective: 1 July 1997

Citations
- Public law: Pub. L. 102–383
- Statutes at Large: 106 Stat. 1448

Codification
- U.S.C. sections created: 22 U.S.C. §§ 5701–5732

Legislative history
- Introduced in the Senate as S. 1731 by Mitch McConnell (R-KY) on September 20, 1991; Committee consideration by Senate Foreign Relations Committee; Passed the Senate on May 21, 1992 (Voice vote); Passed the House on August 11, 1992 (Voice vote) with amendment; Senate agreed to House amendment on September 17, 1992 (Voice vote); Signed into law by President George H. W. Bush on October 5, 1992

Major amendments
- Hong Kong Human Rights and Democracy Act

The United States–Hong Kong Policy Act, or more commonly known as the Hong Kong Policy Act (S. 1731 Pub. L. 102–383) or Hong Kong Relations Act, is a 1992 act enacted by the United States Congress. It allows the United States to continue to treat Hong Kong separately from mainland China for matters concerning trade export and economic control after the 1997 Hong Kong handover.

The act was amended on November 27, 2019, by the Hong Kong Human Rights and Democracy Act.

On May 27, 2020, Secretary of State Mike Pompeo declared Hong Kong "no longer autonomous", putting its special designation into doubt, which in turn eliminated the special treatment for Hong Kong with the Executive Order 13936.

On July 14, 2020, the Hong Kong Autonomy Act (S. 3798) was signed into law. It was enacted in response to the Hong Kong national security law and imposes sanctions on persons who violate the Sino-British Joint Declaration and the Hong Kong Basic Law and the banks that do business with them. Executive Order 13936 normalization for Hong Kong on par with mainland China was also signed into effect the same day.

== Content ==
The act states that Hong Kong maintains its own export control system as long as it adapts to international standards. The act also pertains to "sensitive technologies", which require Hong Kong to protect the technologies from improper use. The U.S. will fulfill its obligation to Hong Kong under international agreements regardless of whether the People's Republic of China is a participant of the particular agreement until the obligations are modified or terminated. Should Hong Kong become less autonomous, the US president may change the way the laws are applied. That special treatment were eliminated with the Executive Order 13936 pursuant to this act along with a 2019 amendment, in the aftermath of the 2019–2020 Hong Kong protests and the Hong Kong national security law.

At the time of initial publication of this act, the State Department's Deputy Assistant Secretary for Export Controls has stated US will not prejudge the situation in advance of monitoring efforts.

Due to the Act, CoCom members designated Hong Kong a "cooperating country" since 1992 until CoCom ceased to function in 1994.

== Reaction ==
In the run-up to the handover of Hong Kong, former Senator Jesse Helms (then chairman of the U.S. Senate's Foreign Relations Committee and a supporter of the Act) wrote in an opinion piece for the Wall Street Journal of the benefits that the act had for relations between Hong Kong and the United States.

Beijing criticized the act, describing it as foreign interference into the domestic affairs of the PRC.

Academics, members or organizations of the Hong Kong pro-democracy camp and U.S. Congress have called for the act to be reviewed in connection with the 2019 Hong Kong extradition bill proposal, the ensuing protests against it and the subsequent introduction of the Hong Kong Human Rights and Democracy Act.

== See also ==
- 2019 Hong Kong extradition bill
- 2019–20 Hong Kong protests
- Hong Kong Human Rights and Democracy Act
- Hong Kong Autonomy Act
- Hong Kong–United States relations
