= United States–Hong Kong Agreement for the Surrender of Fugitive Offenders =

The United States–Hong Kong Agreement for the Surrender of Fugitive Offenders was an extradition treaty signed by the United States and British Hong Kong on 20 December 1996, with the authorization of the People's Republic of China, which would take over Hong Kong in July 1997.

The agreement was suspended indefinitely by Executive Order 13936, signed by United States president Donald Trump, on 14 July 2020, after the 2019–2020 Hong Kong protests and the enactment of the Hong Kong national security law. Executive Order 13936 also eliminated all special treatments that the United States accorded to Hong Kong. In response, the Ministry of Foreign Affairs of China announced the suspension of the agreement on 20 August 2020.

== Extraditions ==
Extraditions under the treaty include cases from:

- Two convicted perpetrators of the Boston Chinatown massacre
