= Hong Kong Autonomy Act =

2020 United States law

- Long title: To impose sanctions with respect to foreign persons involved in the erosion of certain obligations of China with respect to Hong Kong, and for other purposes.
- Enacted by: the 116th United States Congress
- Effective: July 14, 2020

Citations
- Public law: Pub. L. 116–149 (text) (PDF)

Legislative history
- Introduced in the House as H.R. 7440 by Brad Sherman (D-CA) on July 1, 2020; Committee consideration by House Foreign Relations, House Judiciary, House Financial Services, House Ways and Means, House Rules; Passed the House on July 1, 2020 (unanimous consent); Passed the Senate on July 2, 2020 (unanimous consent); Signed into law by President Donald Trump on July 14, 2020

The Hong Kong Autonomy Act is legislation passed by the United States Congress following the enactment in June 2020 by the Chinese Standing Committee of the National People's Congress of the Hong Kong national security law.

The Act was signed into law by US President Donald Trump on 14 July 2020, and imposes sanctions on officials and entities in Hong Kong as well as in mainland China that are deemed to help violate Hong Kong's autonomy, and punishes financial institutions that do business with them.

At the signing, Trump also signed Executive Order 13936 to "hold China accountable for its aggressive actions against the people of Hong Kong". Trump also revoked the territory's special status, saying “No special privileges [for Hong Kong], no special economic treatment and no export of sensitive technologies". He also blocked any dealings in US property by anyone determined to be responsible for or complicit in "actions or policies that undermine democratic processes or institutions in Hong Kong", and directs officials to "revoke license exceptions for exports to Hong Kong," and includes revoking special treatment for Hong Kong passport holders. Citing the Act, on 11 August 2020, the United States customs announced that after 25 September goods imported into the US cannot use the "Made In Hong Kong" label and will need to be labeled "Made In China".

== Background ==
In 2019 widespread pro-democracy protests erupted in Hong Kong in response to a proposed extradition bill, which would allow China to exert stricter control over the city's legal system. In June 2020, Beijing bypassed the Legislative Council of Hong Kong to impose an extensive national security law which criminalized secession, subversion, terrorism, and collusion with foreign forces. The law effectively dismantled Hong Kong's remaining political freedoms and judicial independence.

== Passage ==
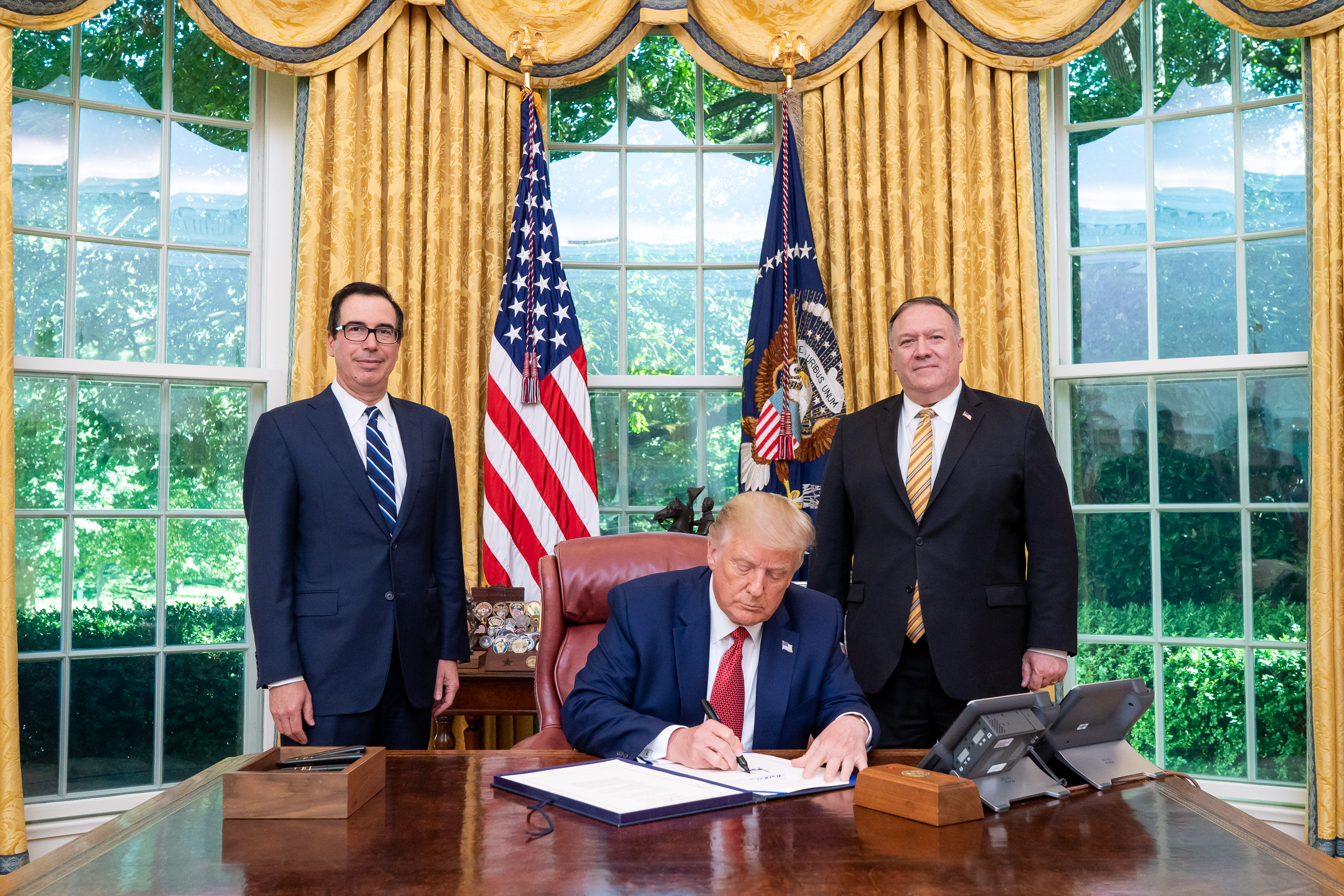
President Donald Trump signing the act, together with Executive Order 13936, on July 14, 2020

The bill was sponsored by Democratic senator Chris Van Hollen (D‑MD) and Republican senator Pat Toomey (R‑PA). It was approved by both the House of Representatives and the Senate through unanimous consent.

== Chinese response ==
The day following the signing, China promised retaliation if the US implemented the Act. The Chinese foreign ministry referred to the law as "a mistake", said that it amounted to "gross interference in China's internal affairs" and that the US was violating international law and basic norms of international relations.

On 30 October 2020, the government of Hong Kong submitted a dispute to the World Trade Organization regarding the "Made In China" label requirement, stating that the requirement was in violation of WTO rules because Hong Kong and China are different members of the WTO. On 21 December 2022, the WTO ruled in favor of Hong Kong and against the United States. On 26 January 2023, the United States appealed the WTO ruling.

== See also ==
- Hong Kong Policy Act
- Hong Kong Human Rights and Democracy Act
- Magnitsky Act
- United States sanctions against China
