= Timeline of reactions to the 2020 Hong Kong national security law (February 2021) =

February events of the 2019-2020 pro-democracy demonstrations in Hong Kong

Timeline of the 2019–2020 Hong Kong protests
2019			March–June				July	August	September	October	November	December
2020	January	February	March	April	May	June	July	August	September	October	November	December
2021	January	February	March	April	May	June	July	August	September–November			December

On 22 February 2021, Xia Baolong, director of the Hong Kong and Macau Affairs Office, proposed that Hong Kong's governance had to be in the hands of "patriots". Observers considered it possible that the definition of "patriot" would require candidates for public office to embrace the rule of the Chinese Communist Party, as also suggested by Hong Kong Secretary for Constitutional and Mainland Affairs Erick Tsang; and that this signified a departure from the position that had prevailed since a speech by China's paramount leader Deng Xiaoping in 1984.

British and Australian governments reminded their nationals that dual nationality was no longer recognized in Hong Kong. On 28 February, 47 pro-democracy protestors from the 6 January arrests were called to a court session on 1 March; their earlier bail agreements had set the session date to early April.

== 1 February ==
=== Jimmy Lai court hearing ===
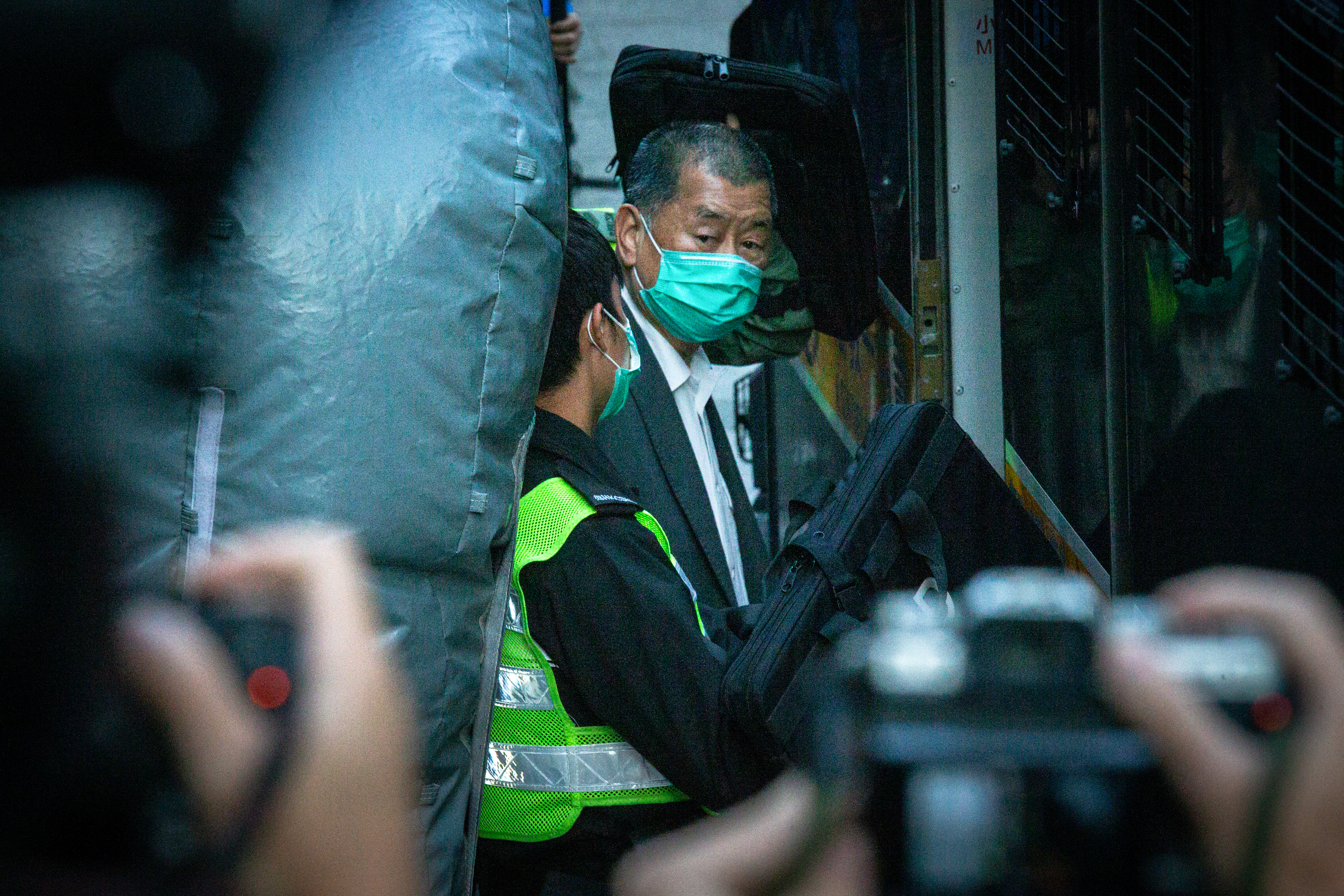
Jimmy Lai leaving the court to the prison van

Media tycoon and founder of Next Digital, Jimmy Lai, was accused of violating the national security law and had been granted bail by the High Court on 23 December 2020. Public prosecutors subsequently argued that the bail provisions had been incorrectly interpreted, and their appeal was admitted on 31 December. A panel of five judges at the Court of Final Appeal, three of whom were hand-picked by Chief Executive Carrie Lam, heard the statements of both parties. They centered around the meaning of Article 42 of the National Security Law, which puts the onus on the criminal suspect or defendant to prove that they would not endanger national security if released. The panel was to further determine if the December bail decision had been legally valid, and the hearing was adjourning. Outside court, pro-Beijing protesters gathered, with a banner of Politihk Social Strategic reading, "Severely punish Jimmy Lai. Denounce the black hand of political black violence."

== 2 February ==
=== Chris Tang: In 2020 the police arrested 97 persons suspected of violating National Security Law ===
Commissioner of Hong Kong Police, Chris Tang, stated in a video conference of the Legislative Council Security Affairs Committee that in 2020, the police arrested 97 persons suspected of violating the Hong Kong national security law, on suspicion of splitting the country, subverting state power, colluding with foreign forces, and terrorist activities. Eight of them were prosecuted. As for the 2019–2020 Hong Kong protests, a total of 10,200 people were arrested by the end of December 2020, of which 40% were students, nearly 2,450 people were prosecuted, judicial procedures involving more than 940 accused were completed, and more than 190 people imprisoned. Tang said that social order had been "gradually restored" in the city, and that investigations would continue to adopt an "intelligence-driven" approach. He emphasized that police would "seriously prevent illegal activities from reviving", and that it would have to stop "radical individuals from launching lone wolf attacks".

=== Carrie Lam responds to the relaxation of BNO's naturalization eligibility ===
Carrie Lam responded to the relaxation of the BNO application for naturalization qualifications, accusing the British government of violating its promises and 'political packaging, full of false reasoning', providing Hong Kong people holding BNOs with a path to residency and naturalization in the UK. Regarding the belief that the United Kingdom, as a large economy, does not care about benefits from Hong Kong, Lam pointed out that Hong Kong has always been an important source of foreign investment in the United Kingdom, and British real estate developers also clearly regard Hong Kong people as their main sales targets.

== 3 February ==
=== American banker police assault case ===
Radio Free Asia reported that a 35-year-old American banker was charged with assaulting an off-duty police officer at MTR Causeway Bay station on 7 December 2019. He was charged with assaulting a police officer and alternate ordinary assault. During the hearing of the case in the Eastern Magistrates' Court, the defense claimed that some CCTV footage in the station was deleted by the MTR due to police actions. It believed that the trial would be unfair to the defendant and therefore applied for termination of the hearing. The police admitted in writing that they destroyed the first set of CCTV footage and only provided the second set of CCTV footage to the court. In addition, the defense filed an application to the court, alleging that the original alert in the case had a large amount of evidence of illegality, including the Good Citizen Award awarded in cash to major witnesses.

=== Hong Kong University Students' Union screened the documentary film 'Lost in Fumes' ===
Hong Kong University Students' Union organized a total of three screenings of the documentary Lost in Fumes, a documentary about Edward Leung. About 70 students attended the first screening, but the university personnel did not stop it. The organizer required student IDs to be checked, and on-site students and the media also had to register to enter. The previous day, the union's television outlet Campus TV reported that the university had warned the union and indicated that security guards may block the screening if it was held.

== 4 February ==
=== Education Bureau announces guidelines and curriculum arrangements related to national security and national security education ===
Education Bureau issued a notice to schools stating that following implementation of the Hong Kong national security law, curriculum guidelines and teaching resources have been updated, and schools are required to implement specific measures to deal with students who may participate in or initiate activities with political messages inside or outside the school. If students raise slogans and pull links in the school, school authorities should immediately dissuade them, and point out if they are suspected of illegal activities or if necessary, consult the police-civil relations officer of the police district. In serious or emergency situations, they can even call the police and record the suspected illegal acts, persons and details.

The bureau requires schools to fully implement national security education within two academic years, and establish a national security education working group, which needs to submit a work report every year. National security content is to be integrated into a wide range of subjects, such as general studies in elementary schools, Chinese subjects, and Chinese history, history, economics, corporate finance, geography, and biology in high schools.

Ip Kin-yuen, a former legislator of the education sector, criticized the Education Bureau for not consulting the sector or holding a press conference to explain the guidelines, saying that the practice was counterintuitive and broad in scope, thus pressurizing the principals and teachers of primary and secondary schools. Edward Wong, a member of the non-governmental legal review group, believes that it will threaten the academic freedom of schools.

=== Canada announces 3-year work visa scheme for overseas graduates from Hong Kong ===
The Canadian government announced that Hong Kong citizens who have graduated from a Canadian college or equivalent foreign education in the past 5 years can apply for a work visa for a maximum period of 3 years. The measures apply to holders of SAR passports or British National (Overseas) passports. However, due to the pandemic, Hong Kong residents outside of Canada need to be hired by local employers and comply with local public health requirements before entering the country. The scheme was launched on 8 February; over 500 applications were received by the end of February.

=== Government plans to amend regulations to regulate 'doxxing' behavior ===
Chief Executive Carrie Lam said at the question and answer meeting in the Legislative Council that five pieces of legislation will be implemented, including amendments to the regulation of 'doxxing' behavior. Lam said that in the past two years of social turmoil, coupled with the raging COVID-19 outbreak in Hong Kong, she has seen the Internet flooded with issues such as 'doxxing', hateful and discriminatory remarks, and fake news. She was referring to governments around the world introducing legislative or administrative measures to deal with these issues, and said that the Hong Kong government will study the approach in other countries and places. She added that it is difficult to submit a comprehensive legislative proposals in the short term, but it will first deal with the more urgent 'doxxing' behavior.

== 5 February ==
=== Female nurse sentenced to community service order for disclosing police officer's personal data ===
A 25-year-old part-time female nurse was convicted of using the computer at the Kowloon No. 1 Dermatology Specialty Center on 13 August 2019 for doxxing on her personal Instagram the details of a police officer – his name, Hong Kong identity card number, date of birth, and phone number, with the title "Mile of the Black Policemen and Doctors". The defendant lost her part-time job as a nurse for 5 years. Kowloon City Magistrates’ Court sentenced her to 240 hours community service order.

== 6 February ==
=== Teresa Cheng accuses media of bias in reporting of Department of Justice's prosecutions ===
Secretary for Justice Teresa Cheng stated on her blog that unnamed media were biased in describing appeals or reviews made by the Department of Justice in criminal cases starting in 2020. She expressed her belief that the relevant report had ignored the justifications put forward by the Public Prosecutors, and even the reasons stated by the court in the judgment.

=== Chris Tang insists that 'fake news' destroys police-civilian relations ===
On a radio program, citizens had complained about alleged impoliteness by and deteriorating performance of police officers, and asked the Commissioner of Police Chris Tang to follow up. Tang denied that the police's performance had deteriorated, and instead pointed out that 'fake news' on the Internet undermined the relationship between the police and the public. Democratic Party chairman Lo Kin-hei criticized Tang for "living his own lies in the world." Tang also claimed that of the arrested persons in connection with the anti-amendment law, only 19 received the Superintendent's warning, which he believed was because those warned had been led to believe that refusing to speak after being arrested would help their cause.

== 7 February ==
=== Radio host charged with sedition ===
National Security Department of the Hong Kong Police officially charged the radio host Wan Yiu-sing (a.k.a. Giggs) with performing an act with seditious intent. The prosecution reportedly accused Giggs of making seditious remarks through online comments inciting others to try and overthrow the Chinese Communist Party, endorsing the independence of Hong Kong, Taiwan's right to self-determination and primary elections and assisting Hong Kong criminals to escape to Taiwan. Magistrate Victor So refused to release the defendant on bail, and the trial was scheduled for 10 May.

== 8 February ==
=== No jury in the first national security law court case ===
On 1 July 2020, a defendant, Tong Ying-kit, was involved in driving a motorcycle with the Liberate Hong Kong flag and crashing into a police officer. He was subsequently charged with 'inciting secession', the first to be prosecuted under the national security law. It transpired that Secretary for Justice Teresa Cheng had earlier in the month written to the legal team of Tong to advise that he would only be tried by three judges as per the provisions of the national security law, out of concern for the safety of jurors.

=== Police seized explosives in Fanling ===
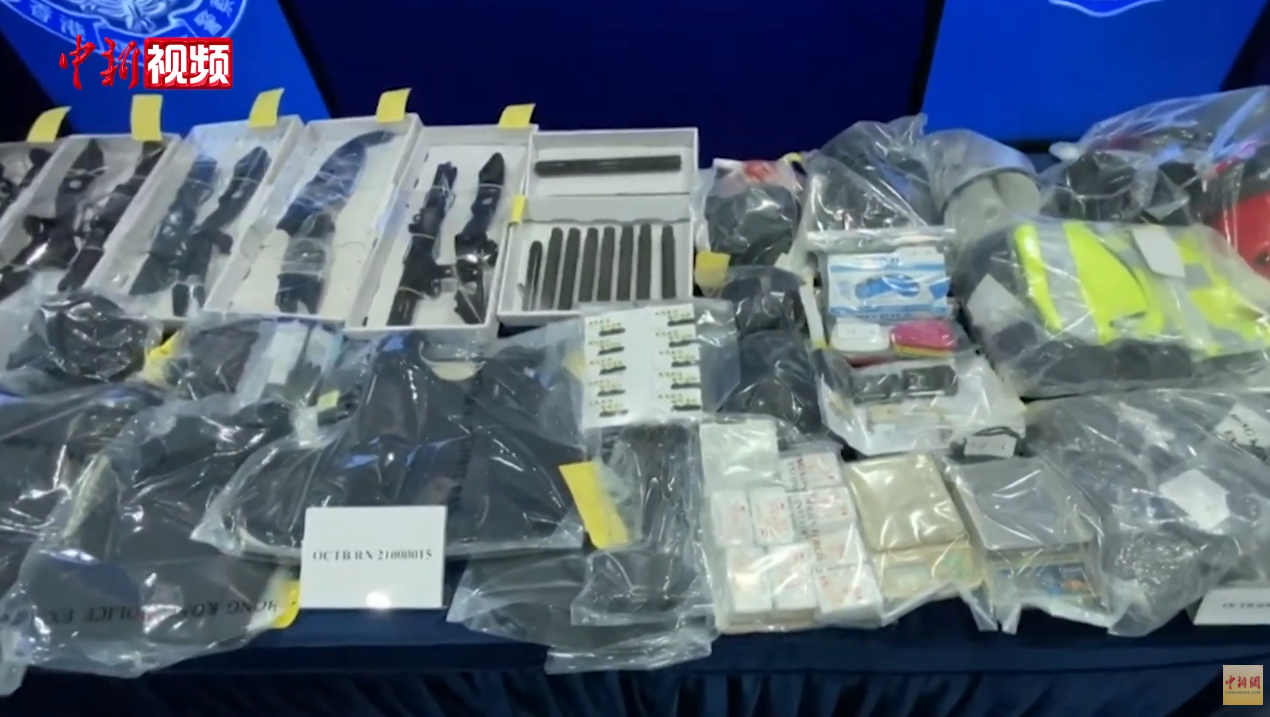
Police seized explosives in Fanling

Police seized 23.5 kilograms of bomb materials, bows and arrows, extendable batons and political flyers at a flat in Wing Fok Centre in Fanling. Two men were arrested on suspicion of conspiracy to manufacture explosives. One of them was found carrying a suitcase with chemicals and electronic devices. Police said that the Organized Crime and Triad Bureau had obtained intelligence showing that some people planned to provide explosive materials to local militants before the Lunar New Year, and that the men were linked to the 2019–2020 Hong Kong protests. It also said that the bureau was currently handling the case, not the national security division.

== 9 February ==
=== Jimmy Lai denied bail ===
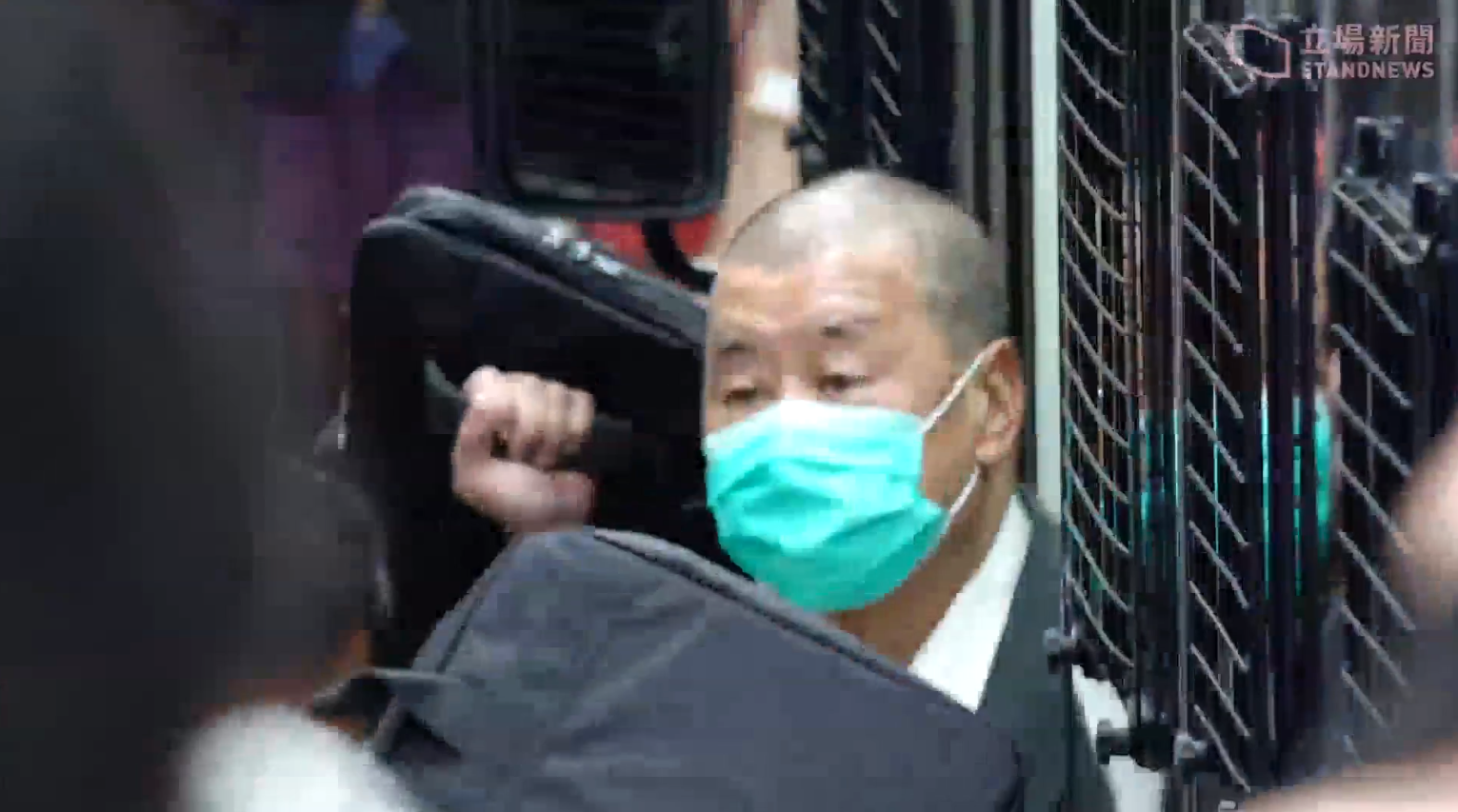
Jimmy Lai entering the Court of Final Appeal from prison van

Court of Final Appeal issued a verdict, and the five judges unanimously ruled that the prosecutor's appeal was successful and the decision to bail Jimmy Lai was revoked. The court held that when the High Court approved Lai's bail, it incorrectly cited the legal principles in the case of Tong Ying-kit, the first defendant involved in allegedly violating the national security law, and that the case also misinterpreted Article 42, misunderstanding the nature and effectiveness of the new threshold requirements.

About 40 citizens waited in line outside the court before the trial, including deputy director of the European Union Office in Hong Kong Charles Whiteley, League of Social Democrats member Tsang Kin-shing, Emeritus Bishop of the Catholic Diocese of Hong Kong Cardinal Joseph Zen, CEO of Next Digital Cheung Kim-hung, social activist Grandma Wong and others, generally in good order. Some expressed their hope that they would be able to enter the venue to support Lai, having lined up outside the court more than 12 hours in advance. Outside the court, about 10 pro-Beijing citizens held up signs and slogans in the demonstration area.

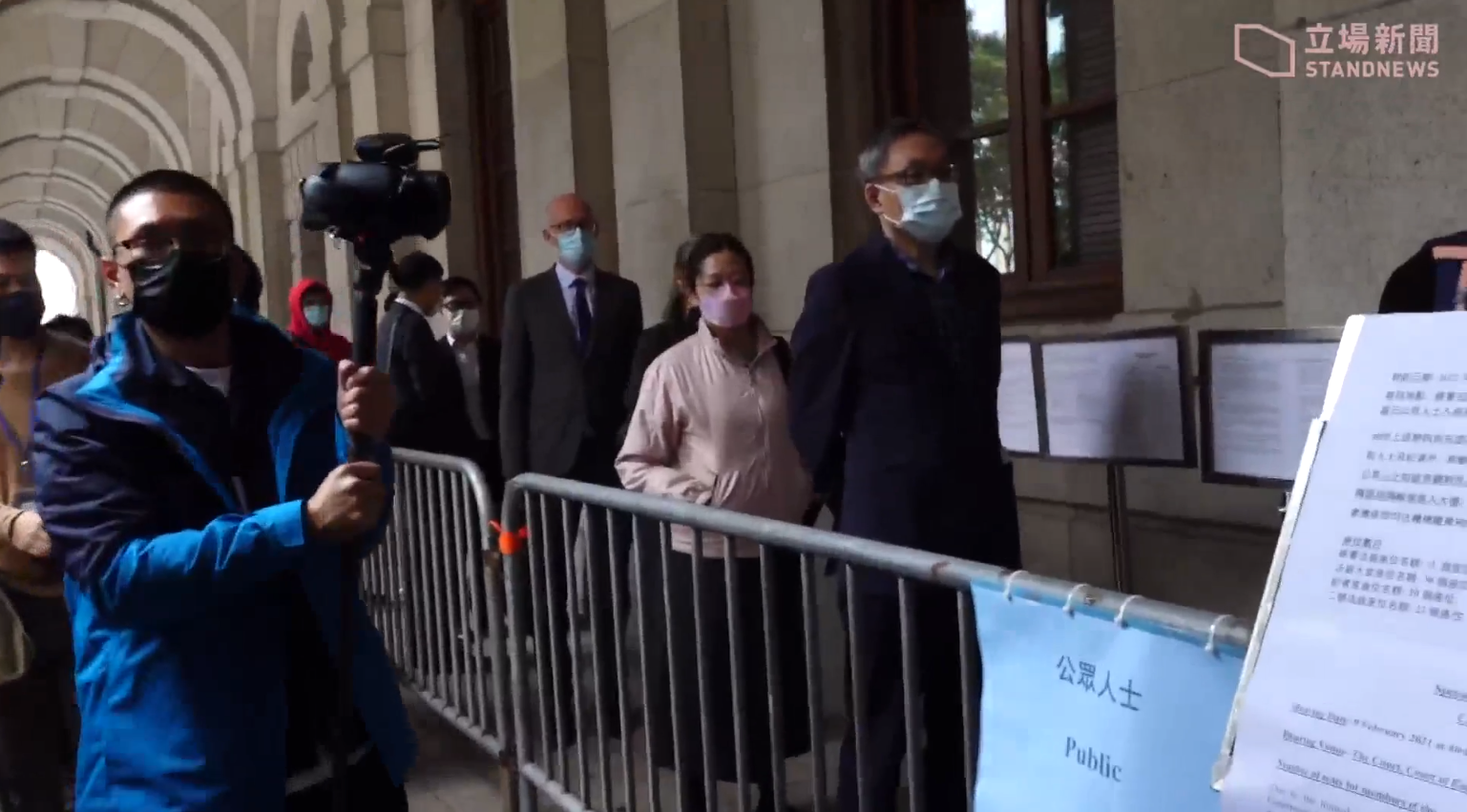
About 40 members of the public lined up outside the court before the trial begins

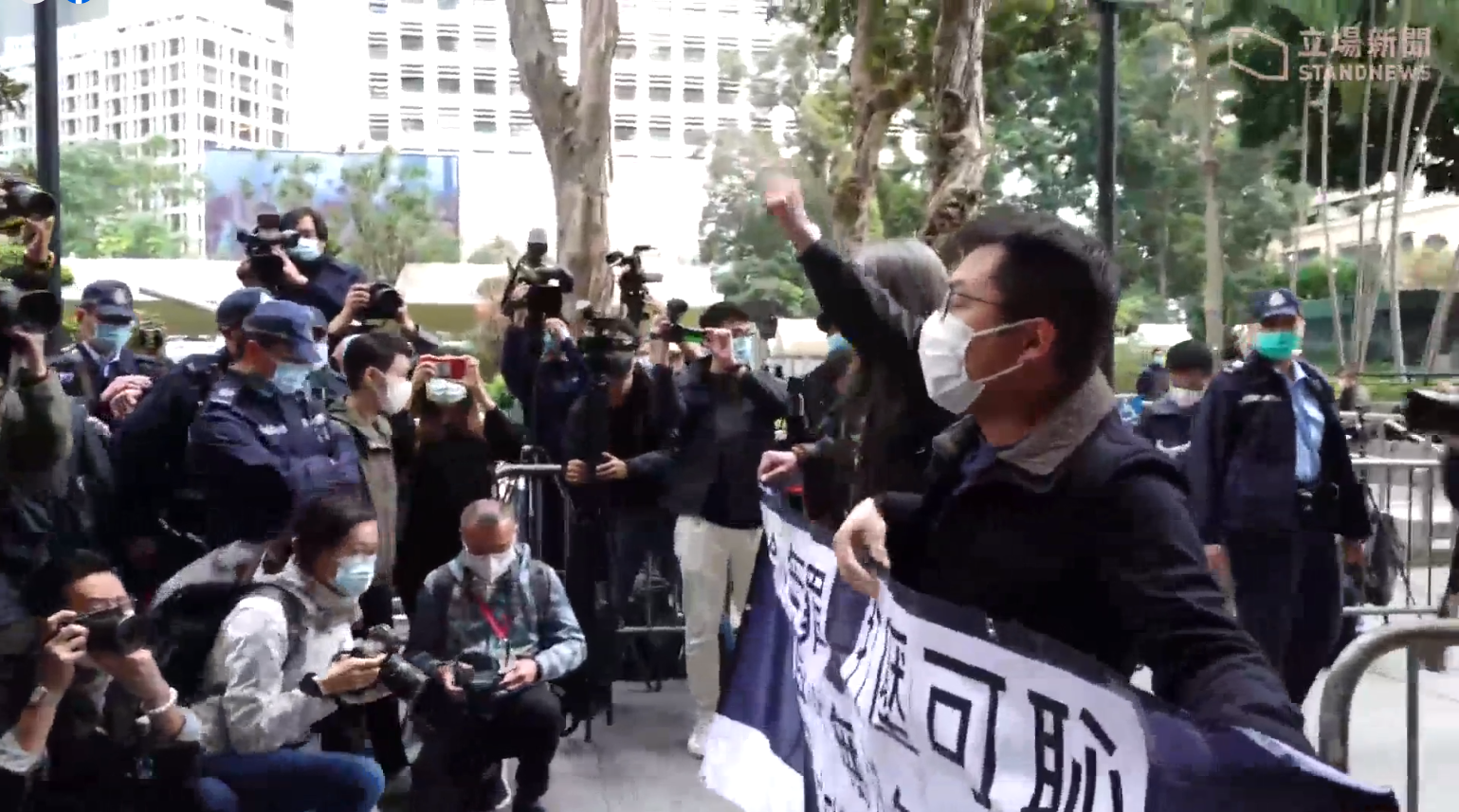
LSD member Leung Kwok-hung and Raphael Wong protesting outside the Court of Final Appeal while holding up banners.

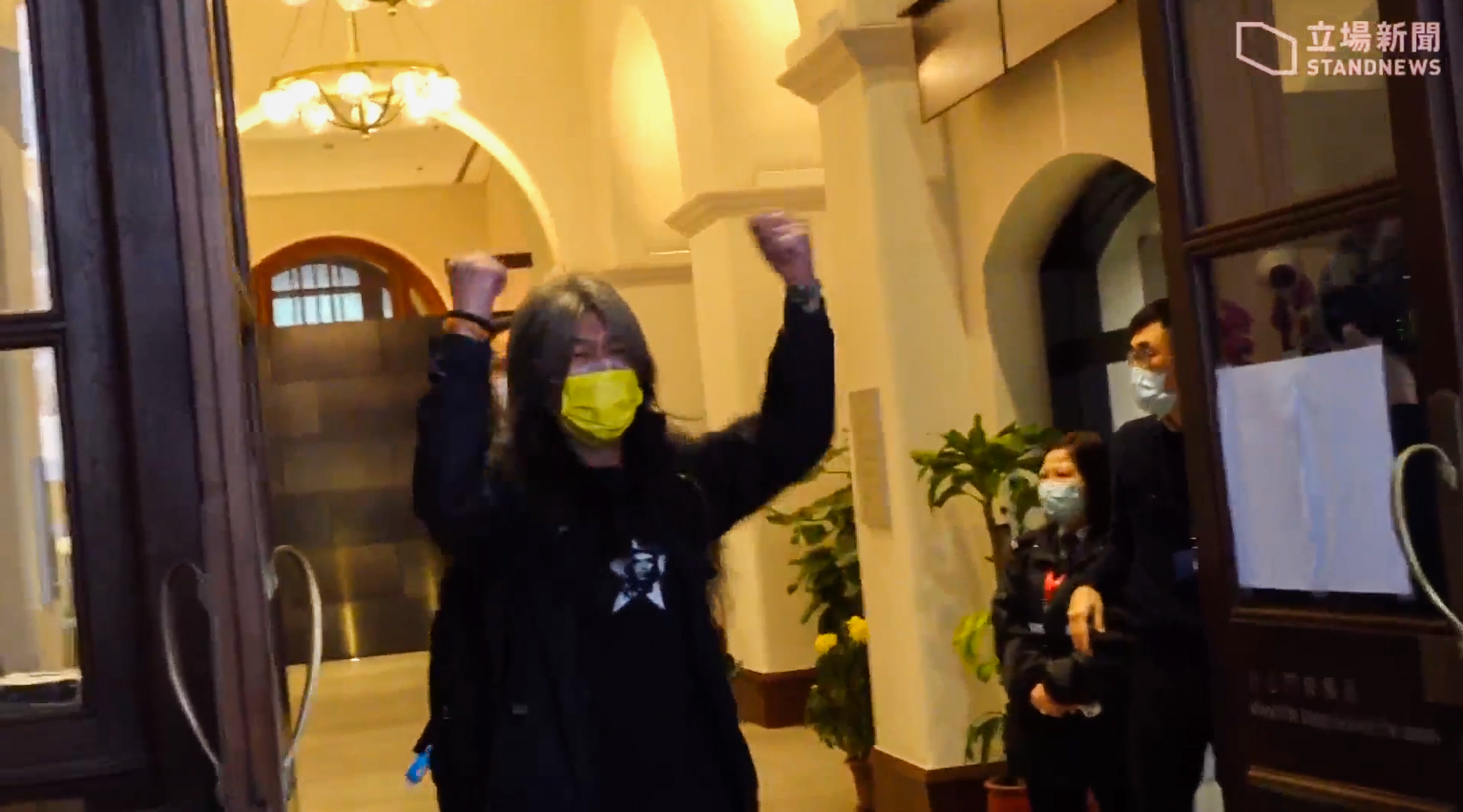
Leung Kwok-hung leaving Court of Final Appeal while chanting slogans

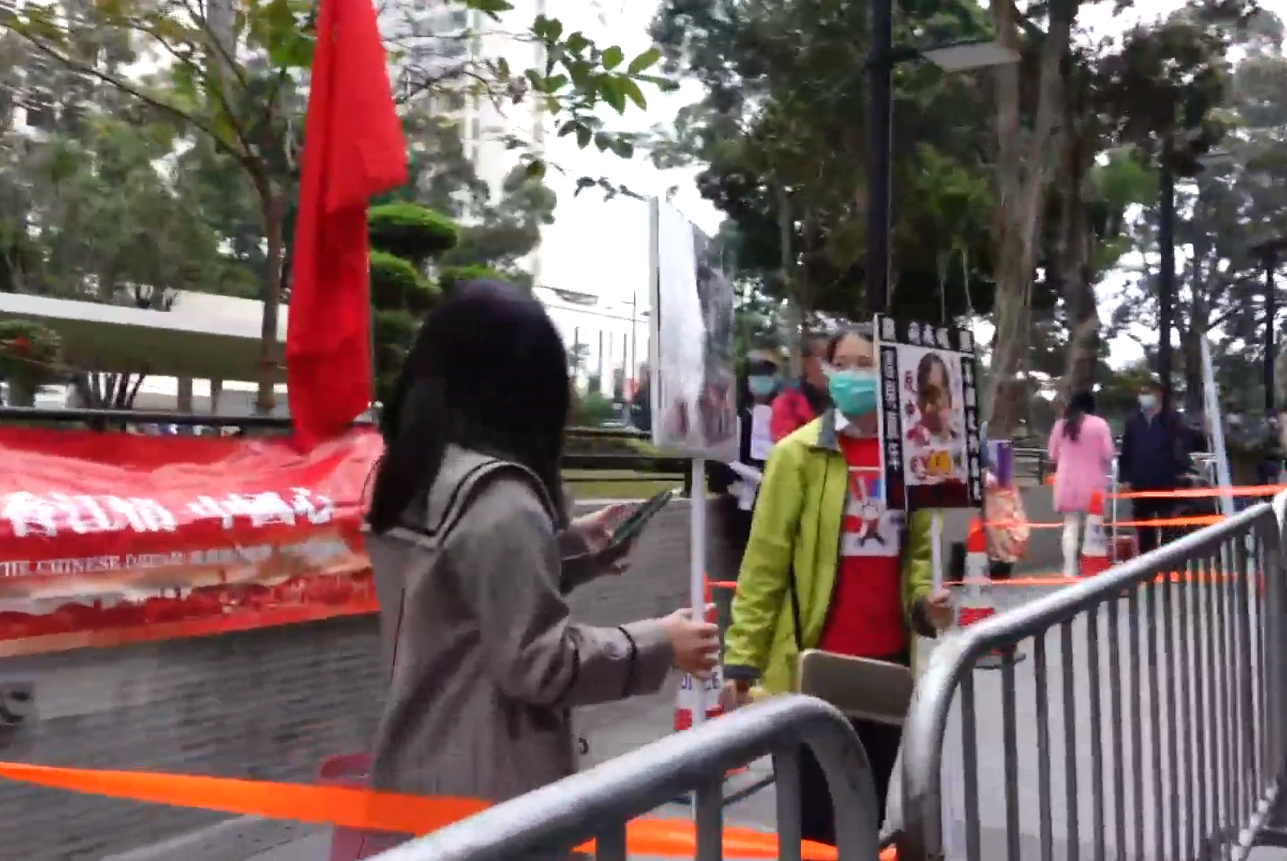
Pro-Beijing protesters outside the court held placards and chanted slogans

== 10 February ==
=== Australia says Hong Kong no longer recognizes dual citizenship ===
Australia updated its travel guidelines for Hong Kong, stating that Hong Kong no longer recognized dual nationality. This followed a similar warning by the British Consulate-General in Hong Kong. If dual nationals of Hong Kong wanted to be regarded as Australian citizens, they would need to register at the Hong Kong Immigration Department to apply for a change of nationality.

=== Government awards for seven police officers who were sanctioned by the U.S. ===
The government today announced the Chief Executive's Commendation for Government and Public Service awards to seven police officers who were earlier sanctioned by the U.S. Department of the Treasury, including former police chief Stephen Lo, current chief of the police Chris Tang, deputy chief (national security) Edwina Lau, director of the national security department Frederic Choi, and assistant division Chief (National Security) Andrew Kan Kai-yan and Kelvin Kong Hok-lai, and Senior Superintendent Li Kwai-wah of the National Security Department. The ceremony was held in the banquet hall of the Government House, and the Chief Executive Carrie Lam presented the certificate.

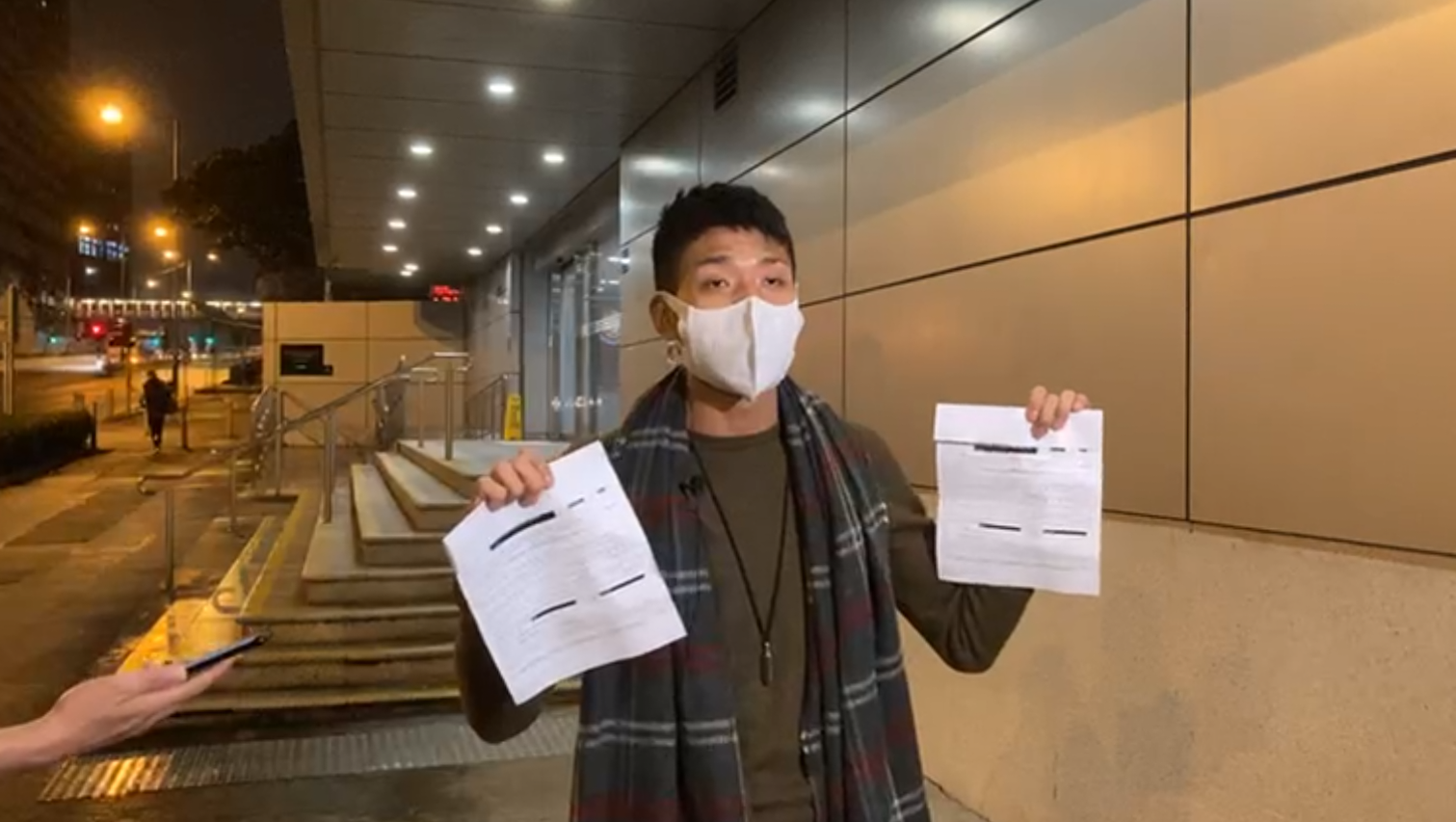
Owen Chow released on bail after being charged with rioting

=== Owen Chow charged with rioting in connection with the 1 July storming of the Legislative Council ===
The 55 pro-democracy primaries participants arrested in January 2021 were all required to report to the police station. Among them, Owen Chow stated on his Facebook page that he was charged with rioting for allegedly participating in storming of the Legislative Council on 1 July 2019, and was detained at the Tsing Yi Police Station. He was released on bail at night.

== 11 February ==
=== Legislative Council reviews Immigration Bill ===
The Legislative Council is reviewing the Immigration (Amendment) Bill 2020, which includes the addition of a new section 6A. Secretary for Security can empower the Director of Immigration and others to instruct certain means of transport not to carry someone, provide passengers' data, etc. Hong Kong Bar Association stated that the relevant amendments can empower the Director of Immigration to prohibit anyone, including Hong Kong citizens, from leaving Hong Kong, in attempts to restrict the freedom of travel and entry and exit granted to citizens under the Basic Law.

== 15 February ==
=== Teresa Cheng on the National Security Law ===
Secretary for Justice Teresa Cheng stated that the Hong Kong national security law expressly protects human rights and the rule of law, and that it eliminated chaos and stabilized society, resulting in an improved overall situation. She also said that some people misunderstood the national security law deliberately or due to inadequate understanding. Regarding the government's research on criminalizing 'doxxing', Cheng said that the Department of Justice would cooperate with relevant policy bureaus in the drafting work, and provide legal suggestions on amending the law.

=== Chris Tang said that police may introduce alternative weapons to reduce force ===
When the Commissioner of Police Chris Tang visited his colleagues at Cheung Chau Police Station, he said that the police had introduced two weapons, including tear gas guns and pepper ball pistols. The purpose was to use weapons other than "real guns" to reduce force. As for other equipment, they are still being studied. Earlier, it was reported that the police had purchased stun guns for testing and studied whether to introduce them as police equipment.

=== Police condemn Apple Daily for allegedly misleading readers ===
Chief Superintendent of the Police Public Relations Division, Kwok Ka-chuen, wrote to Apple Daily editor-in-chief Ryan Law, referring to reports about police procurement of equipment. The report entitled 'The police intend to shoot 15 rounds with a domestically produced pistol' slandered the police, Kwok wrote, who pointed to a passage in the article saying, 'when subduing citizens, it is not necessary to fire only one shot, you can fire four or five shots in a row.' In his letter, Kwok stated that Apple Daily not only ignored the unreasonable sanctions imposed by individual countries on Hong Kong, but also made false claims about arrests made in accordance with the law . The letter also emphasized that the police force has strict rules on the use of force, and the force used must be the minimum force required to complete a legal task. Regarding the procurement of equipment, the police have clearly stated in their reply that the police have been purchasing appropriate equipment according to established policies, procedures and codes, depending on the operational needs, to ensure that they meet safety standards.

== 16 February ==
=== 18 August unauthorized rally's trial opens ===
West Kowloon Magistrates' Court opened a trial on the case on 'Suspension of Police, Black Disturbance in Hong Kong, Fulfilling the Five Major Appeals' rally on 18 August 2019. The trial is expected to last for 10 days. The nine defendants include Jimmy Lai, Martin Lee, Albert Ho, Lee Cheuk-yan, Leung Kwok-hung, Margaret Ng, Leung Yiu-chung, Cyd Ho and Au Nok-hin, charged with one count of organizing an unauthorized assembly and another of participating in an unauthorized assembly. Among them, Au and Leung have pleaded guilty, while the remaining 7 defendants have denied the charges. As the defense temporarily stated that it would submit an expert report, the court adjourned the case to continue on the next day.

=== United Kingdom updates Hong Kong's business guidelines, deleting the phrase 'International Financial Center' ===
British Ministry of Foreign Affairs updated its Hong Kong Business Guidelines, replacing the phrase 'International Financial Center', while referring to Hong Kong, with 'regional hub'. The guidelines had previously stated that basic rights and freedoms are respected in Hong Kong, but the update raised concerns about lack of freedom of speech and diminishing freedoms. It pointed out that after the implementation of the Hong Kong national security law, four pro-democracy legislators were disqualified, the third time that China violated the Sino-British Joint Declaration. The election of the Legislative Council originally scheduled for September 2020 was also postponed by the government on the grounds of the COVID-19 pandemic.

== 17 February ==
=== Paralegal involved in helping 12 activists flee to Taiwan charged under National Security Law ===
National Security Department of the Hong Kong Police charged a 29-year-old paralegal, Chan Tsz-wah, for allegedly conspiring with Jimmy Lai to assist Andy Li, one of the 12 Hong Kong activists, to cross the border to Taiwan. In addition, the police accused him of conspiring with Lai, his former assistant Mark Simon, and Finn Lau, who was exiled overseas, to use Stand with Hong Kong to request foreign institutions to impose sanctions on China and the Hong Kong officials, which violated the national security law. Chan was charged with one count of 'conspiracy to collude with foreign or foreign forces to endanger national security' and 'conspiracy to assist criminals' and was escorted to West Kowloon Magistrates' Court in the afternoon. It is reported that the police had requested the bank to freeze the offshore account of the person belonging to HSBC during the investigation. He cannot be released on bail.

In addition, the police arrested Lai in Stanley Prison on the previous night, on suspicion of assisting Li to escape to Taiwan.

=== Case of Wong Hok-lai's obstructing office work is restricted to reporters for the first time ===
Shatin District Councillor Wong Hok-lai was charged with being subdued by a police officer during the siege of Sham Shui Po Police Station in the early morning of 7 August 2019. He was later charged with obstructing police. The case was officially opened in West Kowloon Magistrates' Court. The court had originally arranged for 7 reporters to enter the courtroom, but in the morning, security staff did not allow reporters to enter, on the grounds that the screen could not completely conceal the appearance of an anonymous witness. Journalists from Apple Daily and Stand News were among those prevented from entering, the first time the court denied journalists access on this ground. The reporters were allowed to enter after police officers had completed their testimony.

== 18 February ==
=== Bail application of Jimmy Lai denied by High Court ===
Media tycoon Jimmy Lai applied to the High Court for bail on charges of fraud and under the Hong Kong national security law. The barrister decided in court to withdraw the application for the fraud case and only concentrate on the bail request for the national security law charge. When the judge announced the rejection of the bail application, Lai's daughter, who had been sitting at the lawyer's desk, cried bitterly, and when she left the court, she turned around and walked outside the prisoner's pen. She and Lai were able to exchange a few words, while other family members who wanted to meet the prisoner were stopped by court staff.

=== Wang Zhenmin said that patriots ruling Hong Kong is the proper meaning of one country, two systems ===
Wang Zhenmin, dean of the National Governance Research Institute of Tsinghua University and former head of the Legal Department of the Hong Kong Liaison Office, said in an interview with Xinhua News Agency that 'patriots ruling Hong Kong' is the proper meaning and core principle of one country, two systems, to be observed in establishing, developing, and perfecting the political system of the special administrative region. He stated that China must strictly implement the 'patriots ruling Hong Kong' principle to consciously defend national sovereignty and territorial integrity, and oppose any secession; Hong Kong must respect and recognize the system led by the Chinese Communist Party and the socialist system. The country will not change the capitalist system of Hong Kong, nor should Hong Kong try to change the political system in the country.

=== Police arrested CUHK students suspected of illegal assembly ===
National Security Department of the Hong Kong Police arrested another philosophy student of the Chinese University of Hong Kong. He was suspected of committing 'unlawful assembly' and 'inciting secession' at the Chinese University on 19 November 2020.

== 19 February ==
=== 12 people charged for rioting during PolyU siege ===
In the early morning, the police arrested 12 people, including 9 men and 3 women, who were accused of remaining inside the Hong Kong Polytechnic University and attempting to break through police cordons near the campus siege from the Polytechnic University to the Hong Kong Science Museum. They became the first group of demonstrators charged with riots in the university. They appeared in the Kowloon City Magistrates' Court on the evening of the same day. Among them, 11 were not allowed to be released on bail and were remanded until March. When they learned that bail was refused, they cried in the prisoner's bar. Only one defendant who claimed to be a first responder was released on bail.

=== Tam Yiu-chung issued a statement on how to ensure patriots were ruling Hong Kong ===
Tam Yiu-chung, the sole Hong Kong delegate of the Standing Committee of the National People's Congress, wrote that Hong Kong needs to establish an effective mechanism to ensure patriots rule Hong Kong. He said that the turmoil in the second half of 2019 to 2020, when the raging COVID-19 pandemic had dealt unprecedented blows to Hong Kong's economy and people's livelihoods, had 'exposed loopholes and deficiencies in the governance and policy implementation of the SAR government.' He believes that if one country, two systems is to go on, the thinking of the SAR government and the entire governance system also need to be adjusted. He also said that when CCP General Secretary Xi Jinping listened to HK Chief Executive Carrie Lam's 2020 work report, he emphasized that Hong Kong's restoration from chaos to governance revealed a profound truth - to ensure the stability and long-term practice of one country, two systems, they must always insist on 'patriots ruling Hong Kong.' Regarding the concept of 'patriots ruling Hong Kong', Tam believes that political participants must agree with the central government's comprehensive governance over and the political system of Hong Kong, and must be loyal. Hong Kong will never allow political participants to collude with foreign forces, openly undermine national sovereignty and territorial integrity.

== 20 February ==
=== Leticia Wong and the High School Student Concern Group fined by police ===
At about 2pm, Sha Tin District Councillor Leticia Wong and the Secondary School Student Concern Group Alliance was at the Lai Street station in City One, Sha Tin. The police received a report that the group there was suspected of violating the gathering ban. After the police arrived at the scene, although the group was given 30 minutes to pack up their belongings and leave, five minutes later the police issued fixed penalty notices of HK$5,000 each to one man and six women.

== 21 February ==
=== Democrats questioned the police releasing criminals in the 721 incident ===
In the 19 months since the 721 Yuen Long attack, seven men accused of rioting were brought before the District Court on 22 February. Democratic Party Central Committee member Winfield Chong stated that the police arranged identification procedures in August of the previous year and identified two suspects. But so far, no arrangements have been made for appearances in court. He pointed out that as time passes, it will increase the difficulty of identifying people. At the same time, he said that there were more such episodes, but the police's attitude was passive, and he was disappointed and distressed by the lack of investigation.

=== High School Student Concern Group protest Liberal Studies reform ===
Six members of the Secondary School Student Concern Group were at Baijie station in Kwun Tong this afternoon to oppose the revision of the Liberal Studies subject to the national education subject. Although the 6 people were divided into 2 groups, wearing masks and maintaining a distance of more than 1.5 meters between them, the police decided that they were violating the gathering restriction order, since they had the same purpose, no matter how far apart they were. This could potentially have resulted in a total fine of HK$30,000, but the police only issued a warning afterwards, and the group finally decided to leave the station.

=== Student Politicism fined for setting up street booth ===
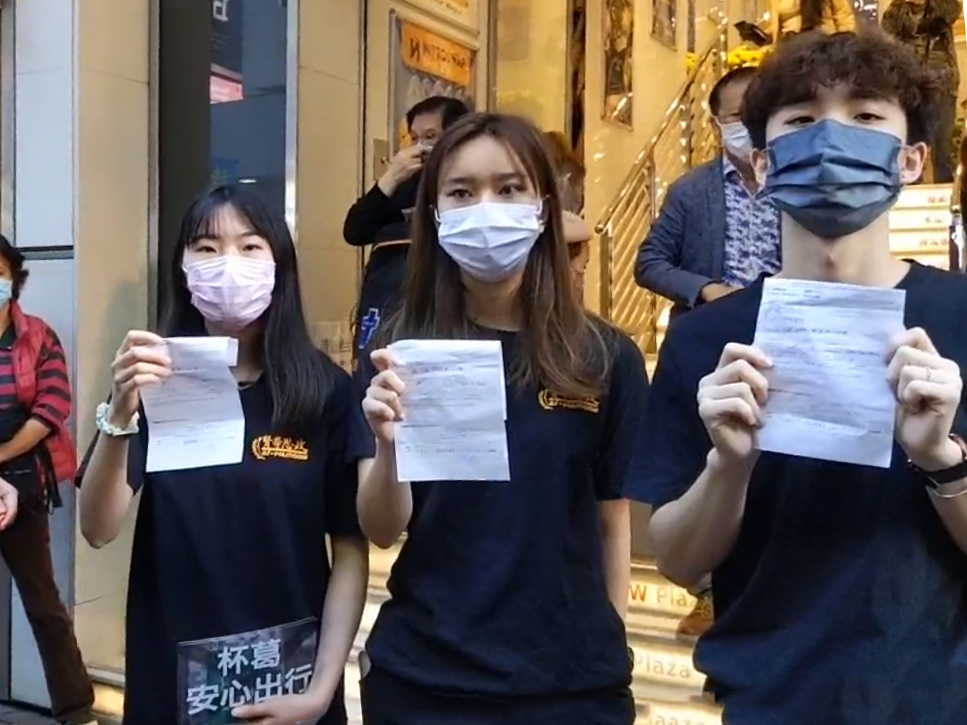
Student Politicism members shows their fine ticket for violating gathering ban

In the afternoon, the organization Student Politicism set up a street station on Soy Street in Mong Kok, urging the citizens to boycott the government's LeaveHomeSafe mobile app. The police car was parked outside the street station on alert. At about 5pm, a large number of police officers went to the street to warn those present that they were violating the gathering restriction order. Some people chanted anti-government slogans and played protests songs. The police officers immediately pulled up an orange belt to cordon off the scene, and waving purple flags, warned those present that they were violating the national security law. Three members of the organization were intercepted by police officers for investigation and issued warnings to them to adhere to gathering restriction order. The organizer, Wong Yat-chin, said that the police said that even if they were separated by more than 1.5 meters, they were dissatisfied because they had raised the same slogan and were regarded as a "gathering with a common purpose."

== 22 February ==
=== Agnes Chow and Ivan Lam withdraw their bail application ===
Jailed activists Agnes Chow and Ivan Lam withdrew their bail application after High Court judge Andrew Chan said he would be referring the case to the Court of Appeal, and thus their bail would be denied. Lawyers for both activists later said the pair will both serve out their sentences, with Lam due to be released in April and Chow in June.

=== Xia Baolong said that patriots ruling Hong Kong is the core of the one country, two systems policy ===
Xia Baolong, vice chairman of the National Committee of the Chinese People's Political Consultative Conference and director of the Hong Kong and Macao Affairs Office, attended the online seminar of the National Hong Kong and Macau Research Association, setting the tone for the principle of "patriots ruling Hong Kong", indicating that Hong Kong's governance must be in the hands of patriots to fully and accurately implement the one country, two systems policy. He pointed out that the unprecedented chaos in Hong Kong was due to loopholes in the electoral system, which allowed anti-China chaos in Hong Kong to stir up troubles, and the principle of 'patriots ruling Hong Kong' could not be implemented. He also alleged that claiming to support one country, two systems while opposing the Chinese Communist Party (CCP) is 'contradictory'. Therefore, a number of 'patriots' standards are listed, including strict compliance with the Constitution of China and Hong Kong Basic Law, respect for Beijing's leading power, compliance with Hong Kong's actual conditions, implementation of an administrative leadership system, and sound institutional guarantees. He also mentioned the need to improve the relevant systems, especially the election system, to ensure that members of the administrative, legislative, and judicial bodies of the SAR and the heads of important statutory bodies are all true patriots and Hong Kong people. He also stated that it is the minimum standard for Hong Kong people to rule Hong Kong. Chief Executive Carrie Lam welcomed the speech by Xia and rejected concerns that the new guidelines would oppress voices of dissent, saying: "If we must use the word oppress, it's oppressing those who advocate Hong Kong independence, who attempted to push Hong Kong into the abyss of violence and those who forget their ancestry, do not recognise themselves as Chinese, who collude with foreign political organisations to destroy Hong Kong."

Observers considered it possible that the definition of "patriot" would include a requirement on candidates for public office to embrace the rule of the Chinese Communist Party, as were reflected in comments by Hong Kong Secretary for Constitutional and Mainland Affairs Erick Tsang. They also noted that this would signify a departure from the position that had prevailed since a speech by Deng Xiaoping in 1984.

The democrats believe that Xia's statement is to further tighten the election space for the democrats and deliberately design a controllable electoral system.

=== Two plead guilty in 721 Yuen Long attack case ===
In the 721 Yuen Long attack, eight men were charged with rioting and intentional assault. The case opened in the District Court. Among the eight people, two defendants pleaded guilty to rioting. The prosecution said it will not prosecute the crime of intentional assault, and those charges will be filed later in the court. The judge criticized the prosecution for lack of preparation, including ignoring the medical report of one of the victims, ignoring the question of whether the victim was willing to give a testimony by name, and the wrong police officer number in the document.

=== Grandma Wong arrested for chanting slogans ===
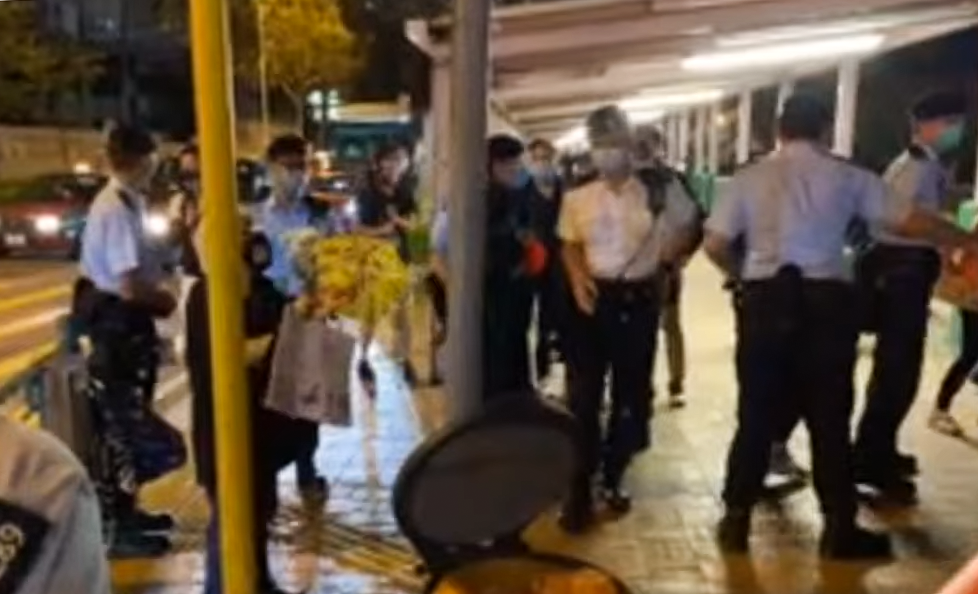
Grandma Wong being surrounded by police before her arrest

A number of Tactical Unit police officers were on guard at the Sheung Tak intersection and in the parking lot. At 8pm, after Alexandra Wong (also known as Grandma Wong) went to the crossroads to raise slogans, she was taken into a police car by officers. The police officer claimed that she "destroyed social peace" and was arrested for disorderly conduct in a public place. While a Stand News reporter was filming the security cordon, police officers also stepped forward to warn him of obstructing other road users, and then demanded to see the reporter's ID card.

== 23 February ==
=== Social worker's bail rejected and prison sentence reduced ===
A social worker, Lau Ka-tung, was convicted for obstructing office work during the Yuen Long protest in 2019. He won the appeal against his sentence which was reduced to 8 months.

=== Hong Kong government requires district councilors to swear a loyalty oath to SAR ===
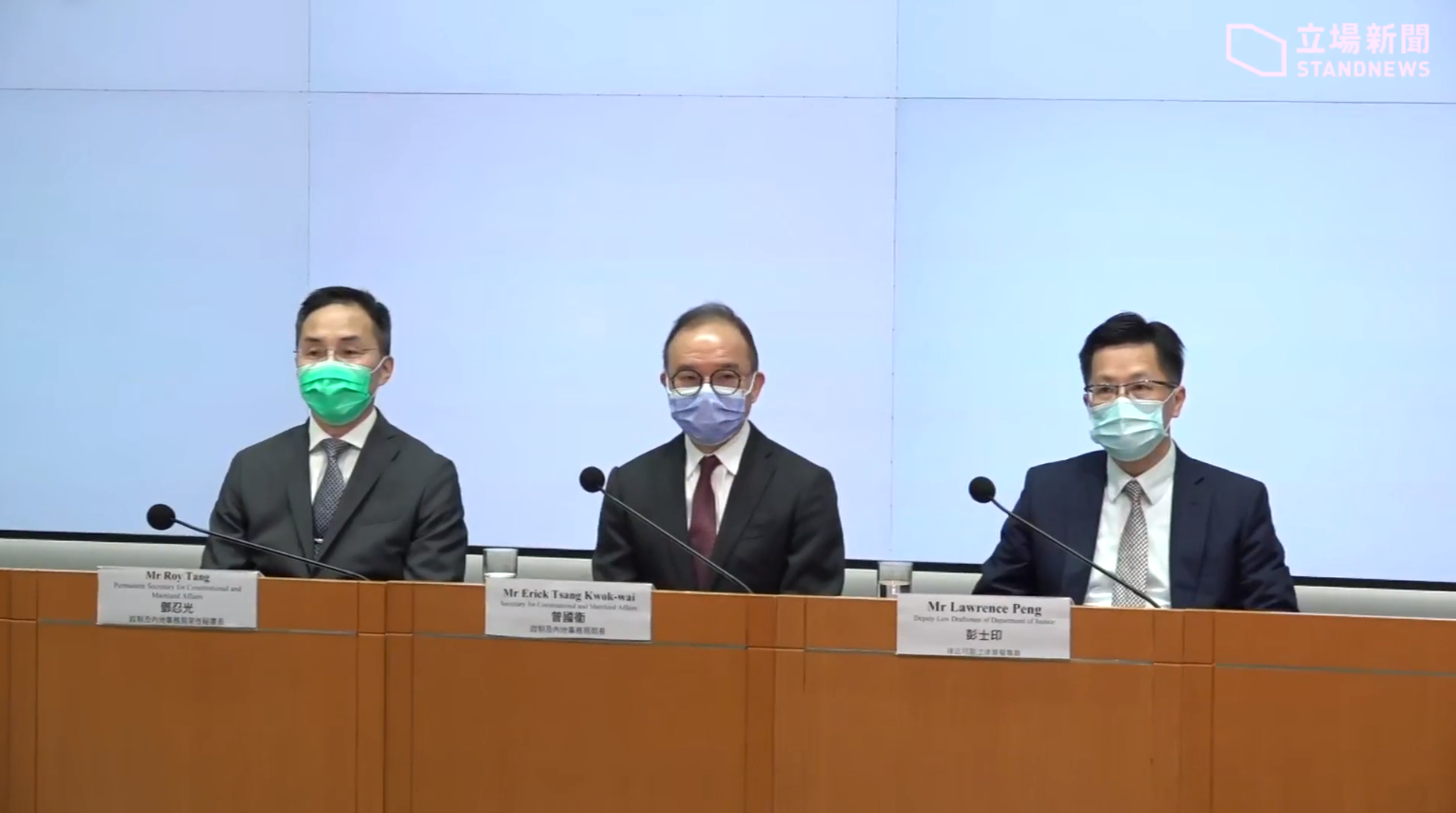
The government proposes a draft to require district councilors to swear allegiance to the government

The government proposed amendments to regulate public officials’ oaths and disqualification requirements, and 9 'negative list' actions, including opposition to the national security law, advocacy of self-determination, threats to the chief executive, indiscriminate opposition of government bills and damage to Hong Kong's overall interests are the criteria of disqualification. Secretary for Constitutional and Mainland Affairs, Erick Tsang, even stated that the list of examples cannot be exhaustive. Under the new law, district council members must also take an oath, including current district council members. If the Public Prosecutors believes that they have violated the oath, he may file a disqualification legal process, and those who are found to have violated the oath may not stand for election within 5 years. Tsang also predicted that 4 district councilors will be disqualified after the amendment passes, including district councilors Cheng Tat-hung, Lester Shum, Tiffany Yuen and Fergus Leung.

=== Germany claims that China is trying to intimidate Hongkongers overseas ===
Süddeutsche Zeitung published a letter from the German Ministry of the Interior in reply to Gyde Jensen, the chairwoman of the Congressional Human Rights Committee, acknowledging that since the 2019–2020 Hong Kong protests, the Chinese government may have used different methods to intimidate Hong Kong people living in Germany. The letter mentioned an August 2019 rally in support of the Hong Kong pro-democracy movement in Hamburg which had been filmed and photographed by counter-protesters "presumably for the purpose of intimidation". The letter also pointed out that there are currently about 720 Hong Kong people holding residence permits in Germany. The spokesperson of the Chinese Ministry of Foreign Affairs Wang Wenbin responded that the relevant reports are artificially creating 'speculation', were totally false and had no factual basis.

== 25 February ==
=== CUHK cut ties with Student Union ===
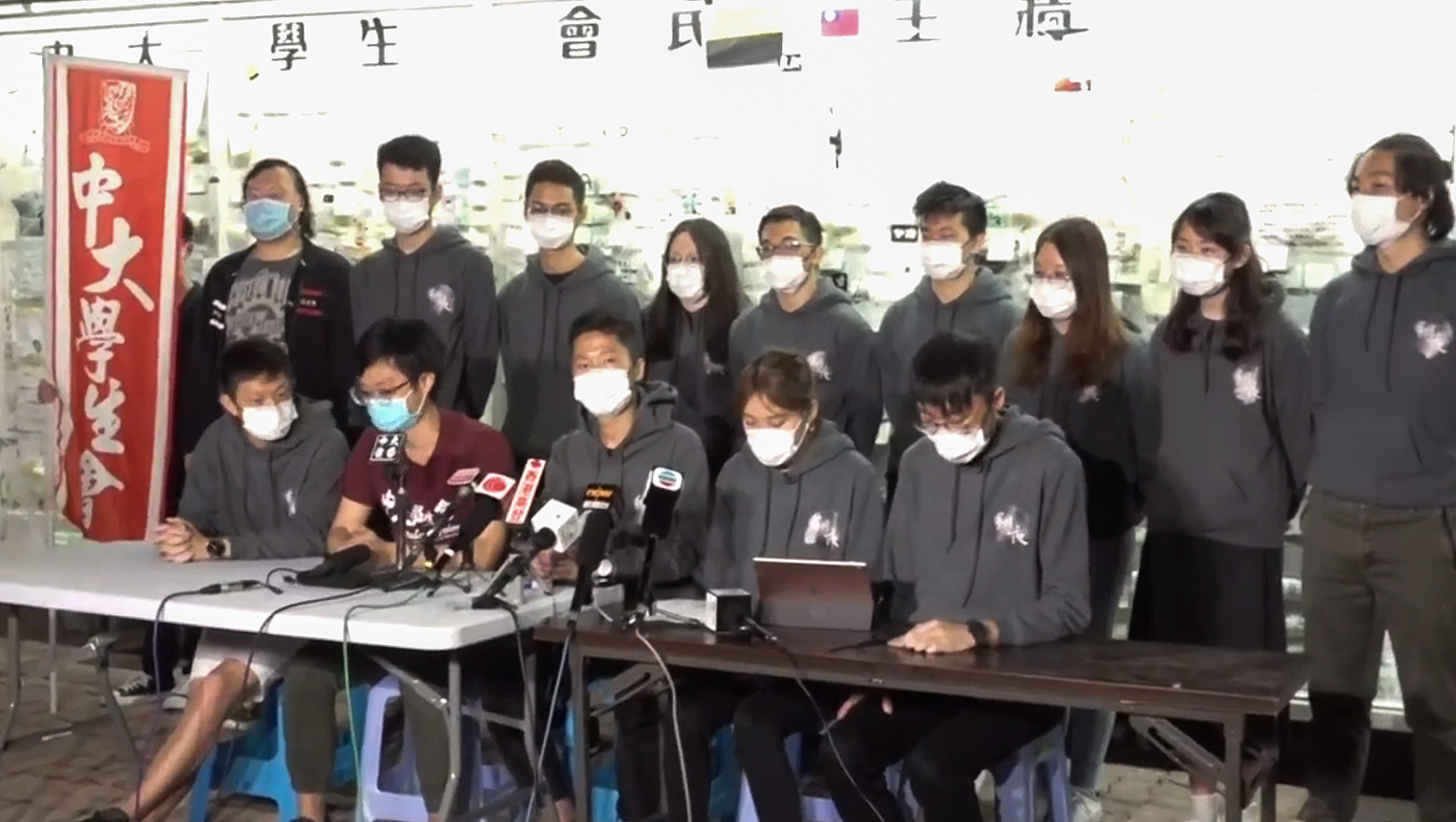
CUHK Student Union held a press conference urgently at 12 am to explain the details

The new 'Syzygia' student union of the Chinese University of Hong Kong had been elected, as the sole candidate, on 24 February to run the university student council. Before the election, it had accused university management of having bowed to the government in assisting arrests, in relation to an incident in January where a security guard had been attacked and an unknown powder thrown at him; the university had rejected this and made counter-accusations against Syzygia on 3 February. The university announced on 25 February that it would cut ties with the student union, including stopping the collection of fees on its behalf; executive members would be ousted from all their ex-officio positions within the university. As justification for its measures, the university cited the failing of the student union executive committee members to clarify their earlier statements, which the university considered to be a potential breach of the national security law and having incurred a reputational risk to the university. The Student Union hastily convened a press conference at around midnight to explain the details, expressing extreme regret and grievance about the incident, which was unprecedented in the more than 50 years since its founding. It criticized the school for suppressing the voice of students and ignoring the authorization by students of the union. Committee members bowed and apologized to their supporters twice.

== 26 February ==
=== Activists involved in the primary election notified by the police to report earlier ===
55 activists who participated in the primary election were accused of violating the national security law and arrested. Many people have disclosed on Facebook that they received notices from the police's National Security Department to report to the police station before 28 February, and expect to be detained overnight and charged. The day they received the National Security Department summons coincided with the Lantern Festival, and they all expressed that they would cherish their time to get together with their families and people around them.

=== HKBU cancels co-organization of World Press Photo Exhibition ===
Hong Kong Baptist University originally planned to hold the 2020 World Press Photo Exhibition on 1 March, displaying a number of works related to the anti-extradition bill protests movement, including the 'Hong Kong Unrest' series by AFP reporter Nicolas Asfouri (Demonstrators sing in the new city square, students pulling chains, photos of police and demonstrators rushing forward), and a fragment of 'Battleground of PolyU' by DJ Clark, reporter of China Daily. However, the World Press Photo Exhibition stated on the Facebook page that it had received the HKBU's notice to cancel the exhibition, saying that it was sorry for those who helped prepare for the exhibition and the people of Hong Kong, but did not mention the reason for the cancellation. HKBU stated that the cancellation was due to detailed consideration of factors such as campus safety, security, and maintenance of epidemic prevention measures. The public can enjoy the exhibits at an online exhibition.

=== Marco Leung's death inquest 5.10 trial, parents lost contact ===
Coroner's Court conducted a non-public review on the incident where Marco Leung fell and died in Pacific Place in Admiralty on 15 June 2019. However, Leung's parents, who had intended to convene an inquiry, did not show up in court. Coroner's Court also stated that they could not be contacted by their phone number. When the police went to their address, they found that the two had moved away. Coroner Ko Wai-hung urged Leung's family to contact him as soon as possible. The case is expected to start trial on 10 May, when a jury will be set up. The court will summon more than 30 witnesses, including firefighters, police officers, police negotiators, and Pacific Place staff who were on duty at Pacific Place that day, but not including Roy Kwong, a former legislative council member who had been advising at the scene. Coroner's Court welcomes all citizens to provide evidence.

=== Three people sentenced to 9 months for unlawful assembly in 5 August rally ===
A 22-year-old male kitchen worker and a 26-year-old female registered social worker denied participating in an unlawful assembly on Tai Wo Road in Tai Po on the evening of 5 August 2019. The defense pleaded that the 22-year-old defendant was under tremendous mental stress due to the case, while the 26-year-old defendant was not admitted by the company because of the case. However, Fanling Magistrates' Court Chief Magistrate Don So pointed out that they wore gloves like others in the illegal assembly. In addition, they did not wear reflective clothing or had reporter cards, and they did not appear to be passersby. They were found guilty and imprisoned for 9 months.

=== Teresa Cheng speaks at the UN Human Rights Council ===
Hong Kong Secretary of Justice Teresa Cheng delivered a video message at the 46th session of the UN Human Rights Council. She said that the national security law had been effective in restoring law and order and maintaining Hong Kong's national security, allowing Hong Kong residents to enjoy their rights and freedoms in a safe and peaceful environment. She stressed the continuing impartiality and independence of the judiciary, and called the measures that formed the national security law "conducive to the rule of law, the protection of human rights, and the successful implementation of the one country, two systems policy."

== 27 February ==
=== Power for Democracy disbanded ===
Since 2002, Power for Democracy has been responsible for coordinating the democrats' participation in the election of the Legislative Council and District Councils. The convener, Andrew Chiu, stated that in response to the latest developments in Hong Kong, the mission had been completed under the political situation of the new era, and operations have been immediately suspended and disbanded.

=== New School for Democracy and the German think tank Global Innovation Center withdraw from Hong Kong ===
According to Reuters, several foreign non-government organizations including the New School for Democracy and the German think tank, the Global Innovation Center, withdrew from Hong Kong for security reasons. The New School for Democracy, which had been founded by dissident Wang Dan, moved to Taiwan in September 2020, its secretary general citing concerns for the safety of staff. Global Innovation Hub, an affiliate of the Friedrich Naumann Foundation for Freedom, a think tank closely related to the German Free Democratic Party, also withdrew from Hong Kong in September 2020 to Taiwan.

== 28 February ==
=== 47 pro-democracy activists charged under National Security Law ===
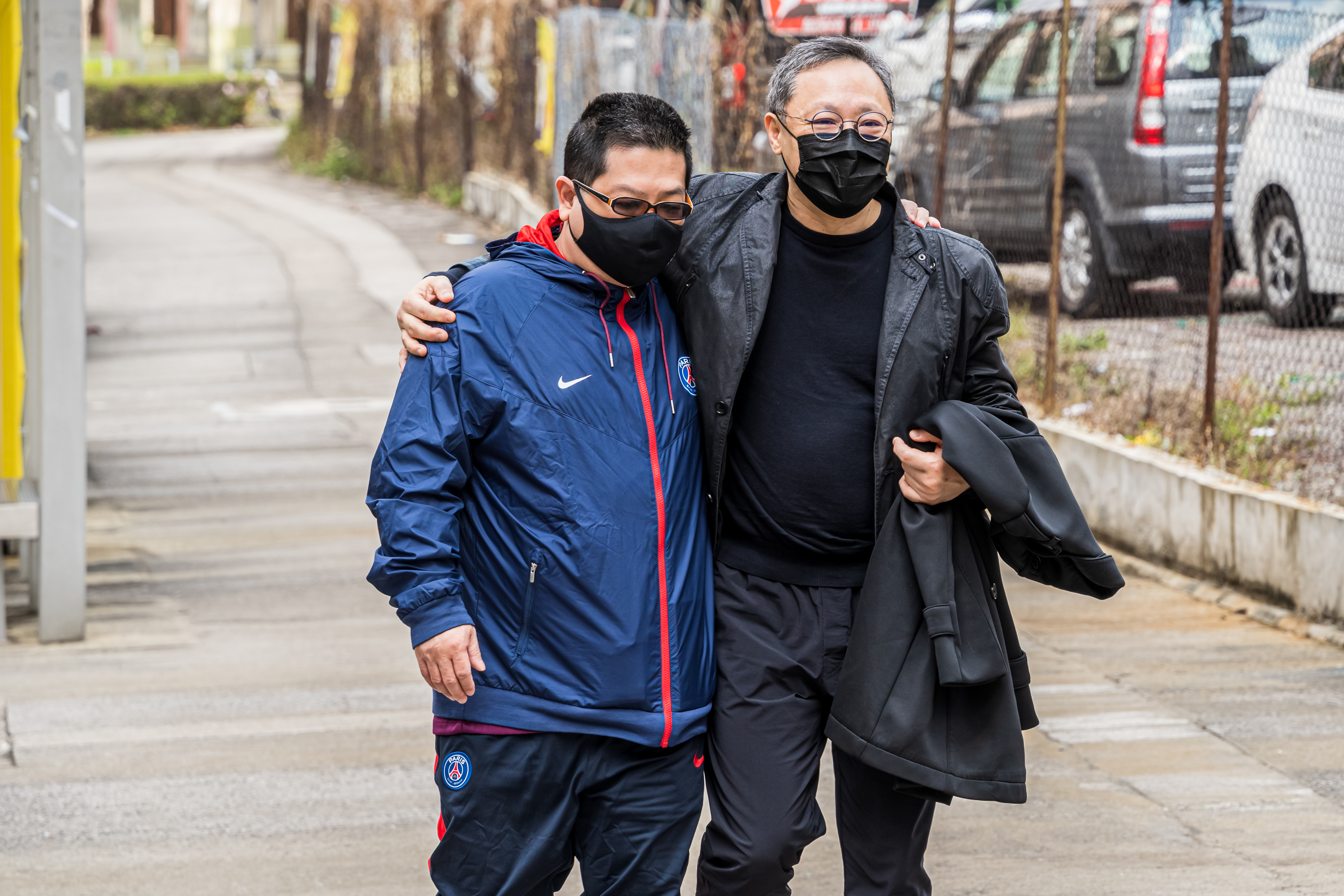
Benny Tai, in black, reported to the Ma On Shan Police Station early at the request of the police

Fifty-three candidates who participated in the primary election of the pro-democracy camp last year had been released on bail after being arrested in January 2021 for violating the national security law. 47 were told to report to police stations for detention on 28 February, ahead of appearing in West Kowloon Magistrates' Courts on 1 March. Police charged each of them with one count of 'conspiracy to commit subversion'. Hundreds of protesters gathered at the court to show support, and some chanted pro-democracy slogans. Police warned those gathered to adhere to coronavirus regulations by splitting into groups of at most four people.

After entering the police station, Lam King-nam said he felt unwell and was sent to the hospital for examination.

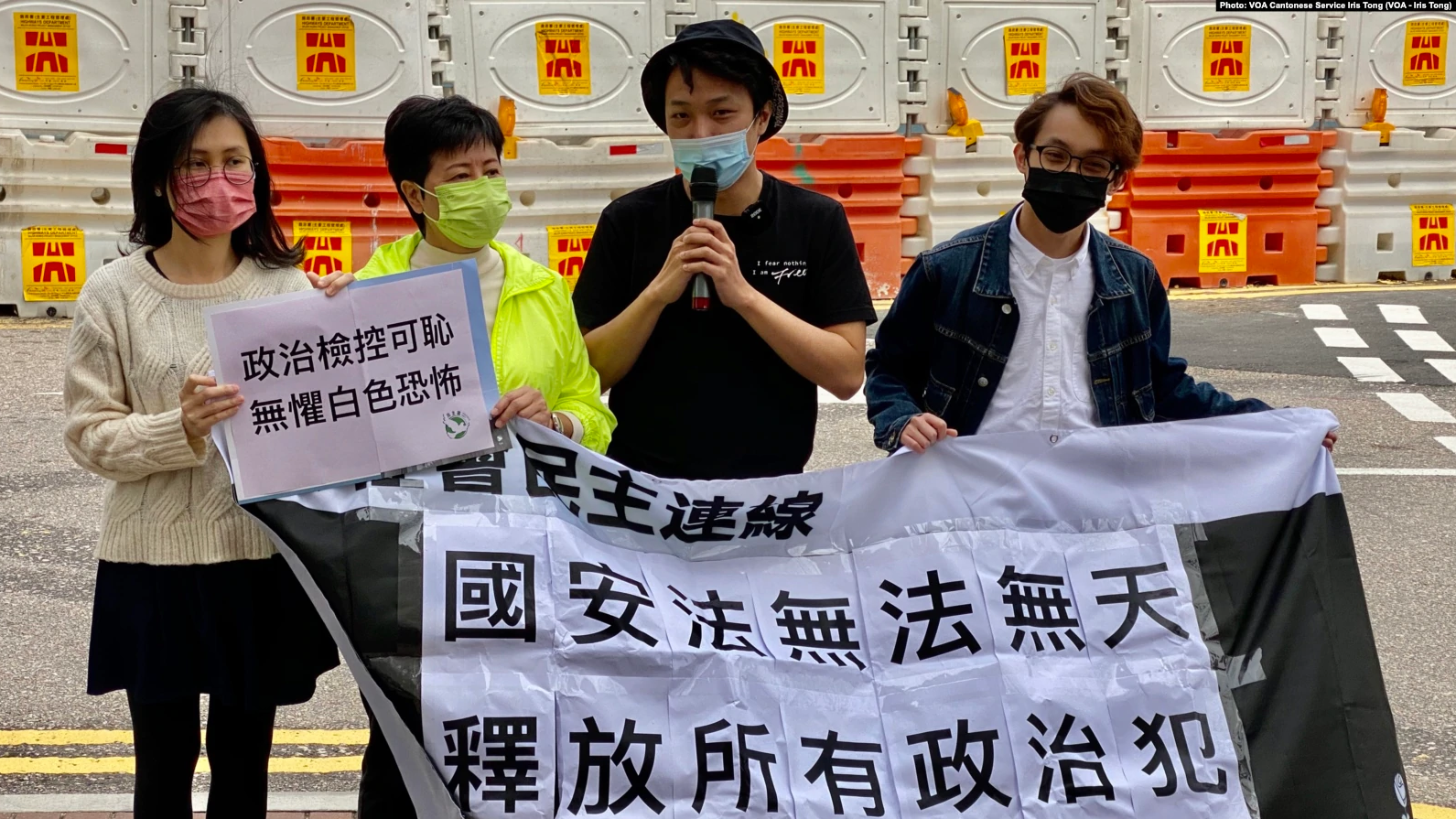
Jimmy Sham (second from right), the former convener of the Civil Human Rights Front, and Helena Wong, a former legislator of the Democratic Party, report to the Yau Ma Tei Police Station

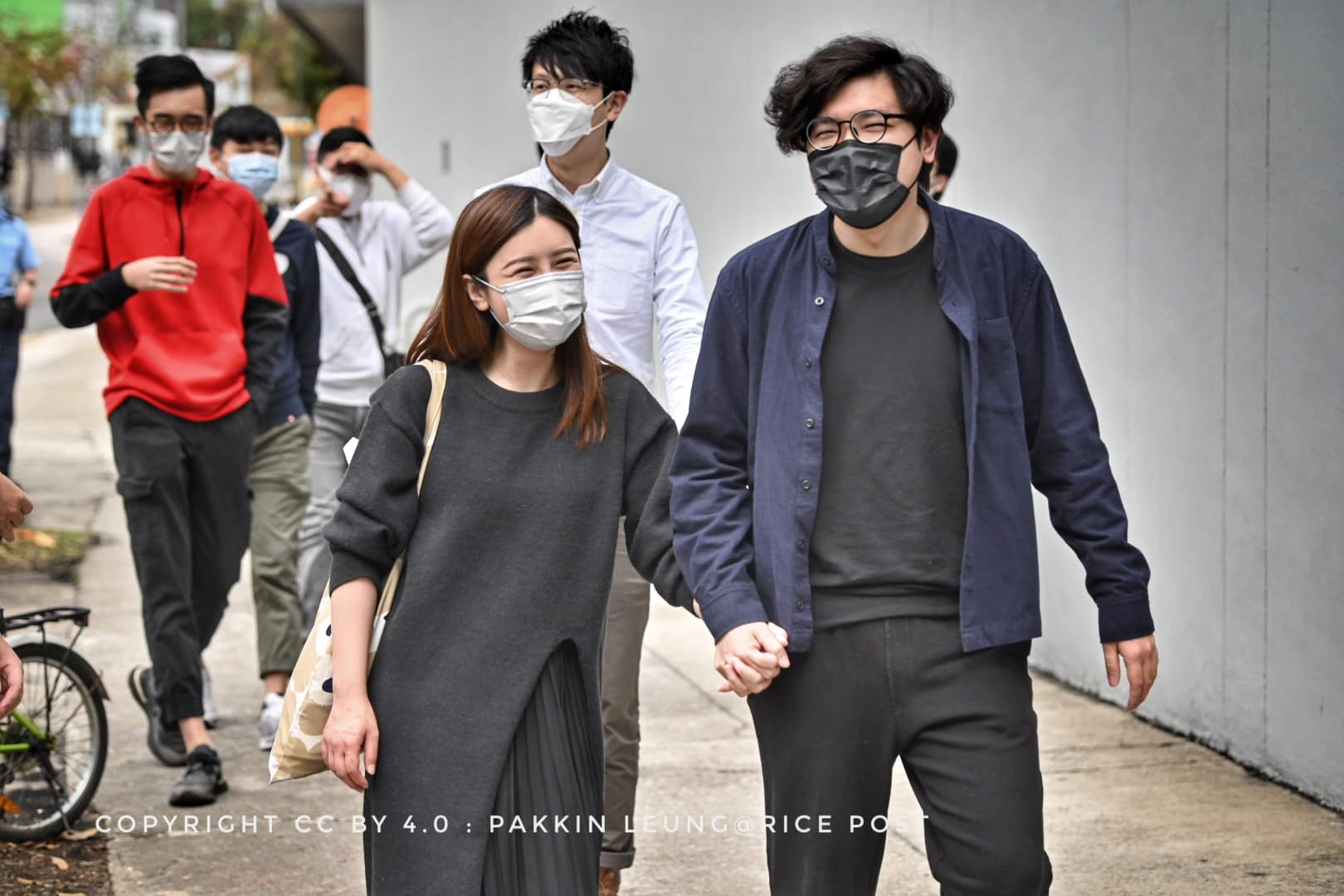
Sam Cheung and his wife holding hands while walking to Tuen Mun Police Station to report

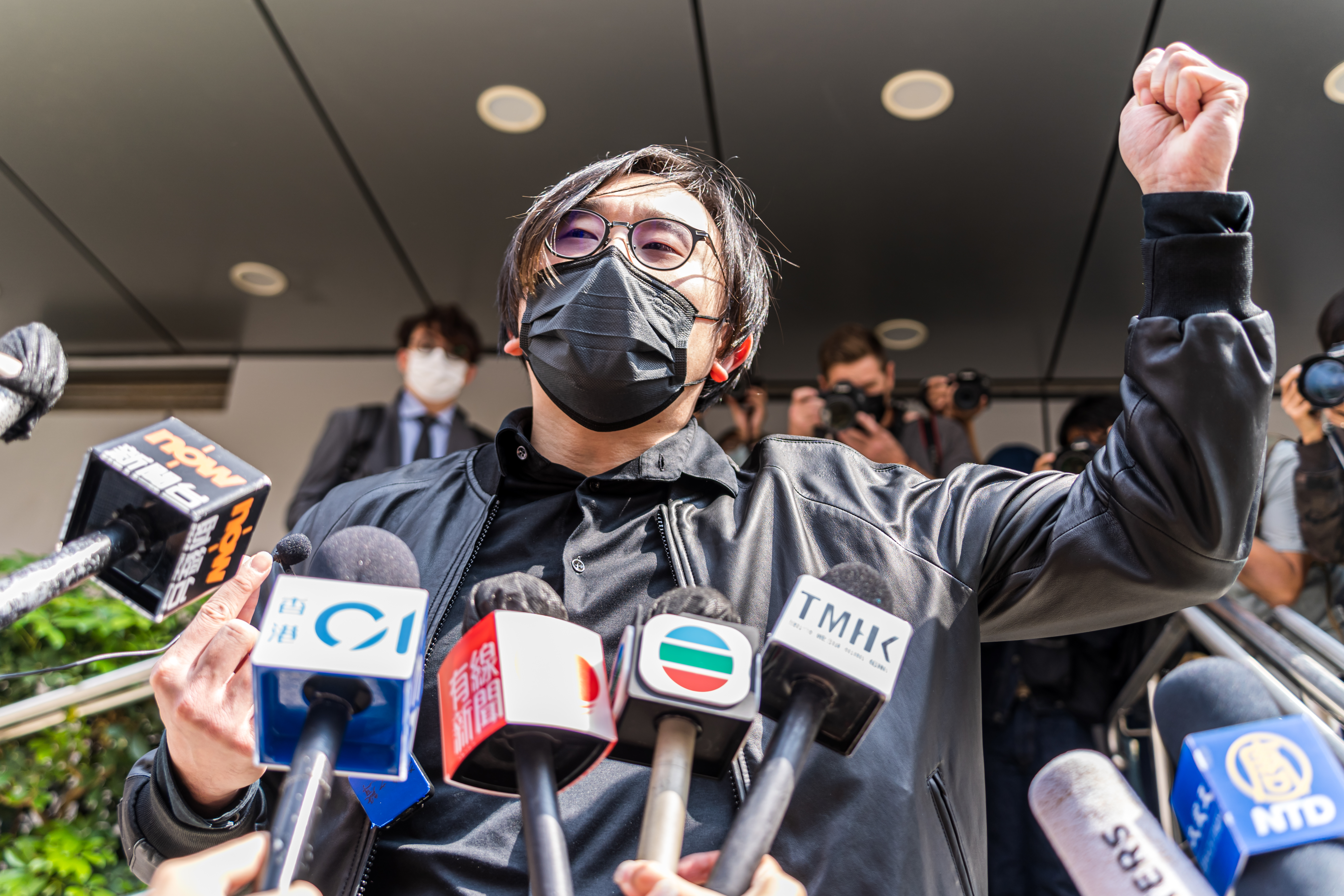
Mike Lam speaking with reporters before entering the police station

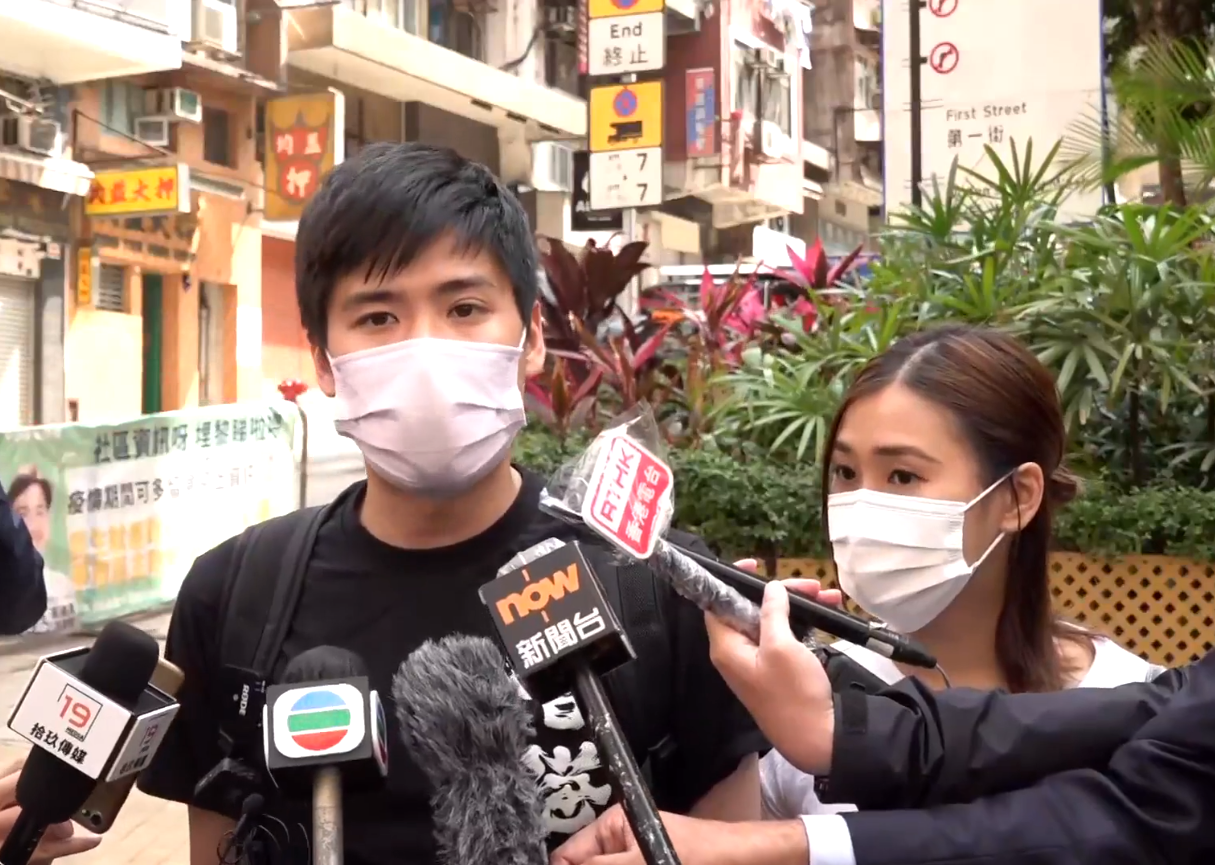
Lester Shum with his wife speaking to media before reporting to the Western District Police Station

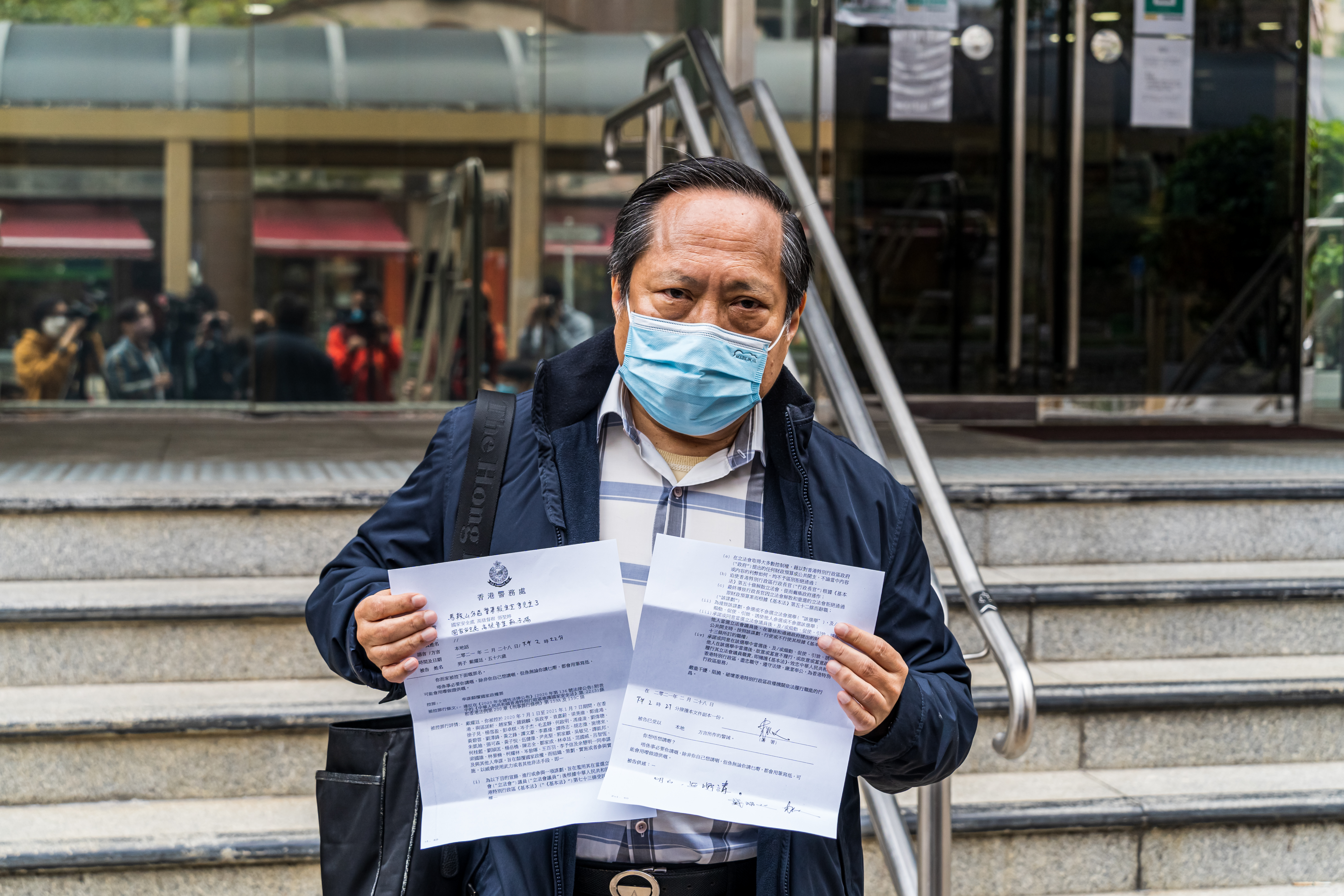
Albert Ho outside the police station, revealing details of the charge to the media

=== Student Politicism and HAEA street booth taken away ===
At about 5pm, Student Politicism and the Hospital Authority Employees Alliance set up a street booth at the junction of Sai Yeung Choi Street South and Soy Street in Mong Kok. Police officers arrived at the scene and caused public dissatisfaction. Later, orange tape was pulled up to cordon them and police asked the citizens to leave. The police officers suddenly rushed in the direction of Sai Yeung Choi Street South, subdued a man on the ground, and took him into the police car. On 1 March, the police stated that the 29-year-old man was arrested for misconduct in a public place, resisting arrest and assaulting police.
