= History of the Hong Kong Police Force =

Emblem of the Royal Hong Kong Police Force (1969─1997)

The history of the Hong Kong Police originates in 1841, when the Hong Kong Police Force (HKPF) was officially established by the British colonial government, the same year that the British had settled in Hong Kong. While changes have been implemented throughout the People's Republic of China (PRC) since the transfer of sovereignty in 1997, the Hong Kong Police Force (formerly the Royal Hong Kong Police Force) has since been responsible for serving the city.

== 19th century ==
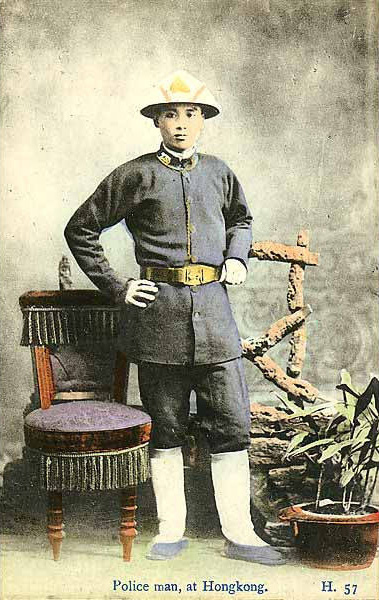
Hong Kong police officer, early 20th century.

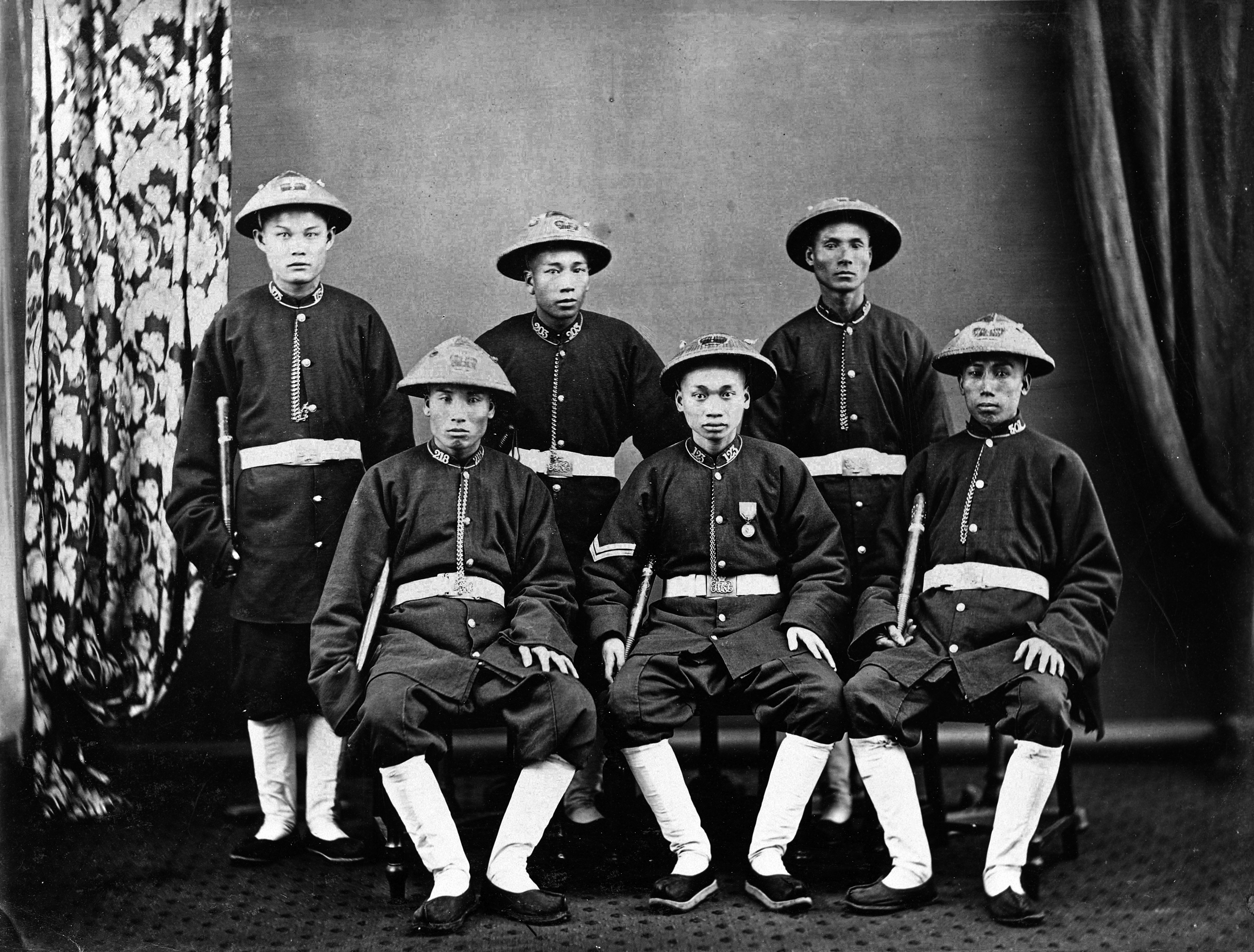
A group of Hong Kong native policemen in the late 19th century.

On 30 April 1841, twelve weeks after the British had landed in Hong Kong, orders were given by Captain Charles Elliot to establish a police force in the new colony. The first chief of police was Captain William Caine, who also served as the Captain of the Chief Magistrate.

The Hong Kong Police was officially established by the colonial government on 1 May 1844, and the duties of the magistrate and head of police were separated. At the time of its establishment, the police force consisted of thirty-two men. The ethnic composition of the inaugural force consisted of mixed Chinese, European nationals or Indians. Policemen from different ethnic groups were assigned a different alphabetical letter before their batch numbers: "A" for Europeans, "B" for Indians, "C" for Cantonese, and "D" for recruited from Shandong Province. "E" was later assigned to White Russians who arrived from Siberia after the Russian Civil War.

For several decades, Hong Kong was a 'rough-and-tumble' port with a 'wild west' attitude to law and order. Consequently, many members of the force were equally rough individuals. As Hong Kong began to flourish and make its place in the world, Britain began to take a dim view of the government's lack of grip in both public and private sectors, and officials with strong values and Victorian concepts of management and discipline were sent to raise standards. Strong leadership, both of Hong Kong and of the force, began to pay dividends towards the latter part of the 19th century, and business prospered accordingly. Piracy on the seas was a constant challenge for the Water Police.

Responsibility for the city's prisons passed out of the control of the police in 1879. The 1890s brought challenges, both operational and organisational - there were outbreaks of bubonic plague in 1893–94; whilst the annexation of the New Territories (an additional 356sq.miles of land) in 1898–99, created difficult, but surmountable problems.

== 20th century ==
=== Early 20th century ===
The fall of the Qing dynasty in 1911 brought civil unrest, and the start of World War I in 1914 saw many European officers enlist and return to the United Kingdom. In the 1920s and 1930s, Hong Kong's general peace was punctuated by bouts of civil unrest sparked by labour disputes, instability in China and Japanese militarism. When war came again in 1941, an unknown number of police officers and reserves - Chinese, Indian, European and Eurasian - had their lives taken by the Japanese during both the main conflict and the occupation.

=== World War II ===
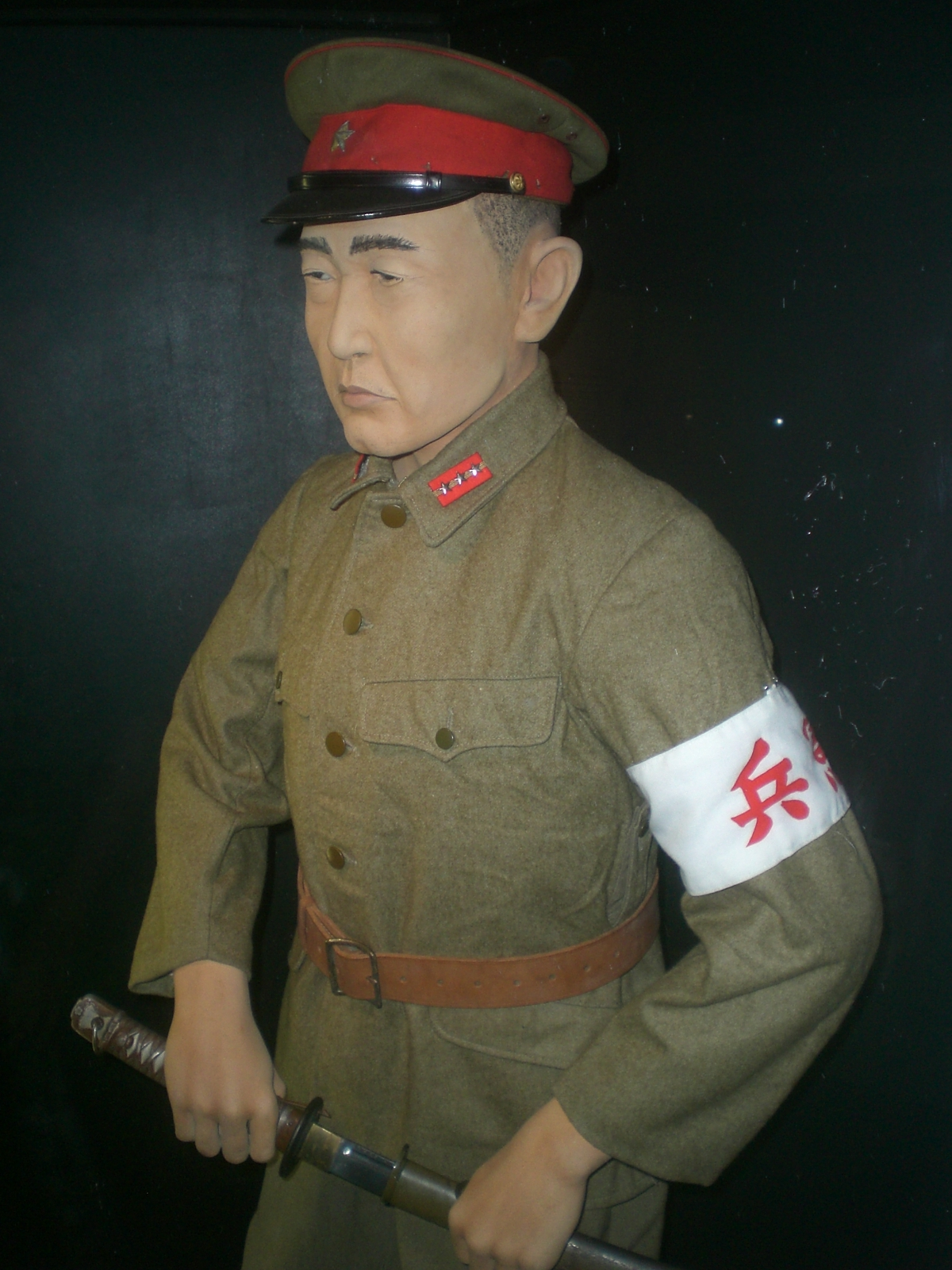
Model of Hong Kong Kempeitai officer in uniform

From 1942 to 1945, Japan occupied Hong Kong and the HKPF was temporarily disbanded and replaced by Japanese Kempeitai, which was headquartered at the Legislative Council Building.

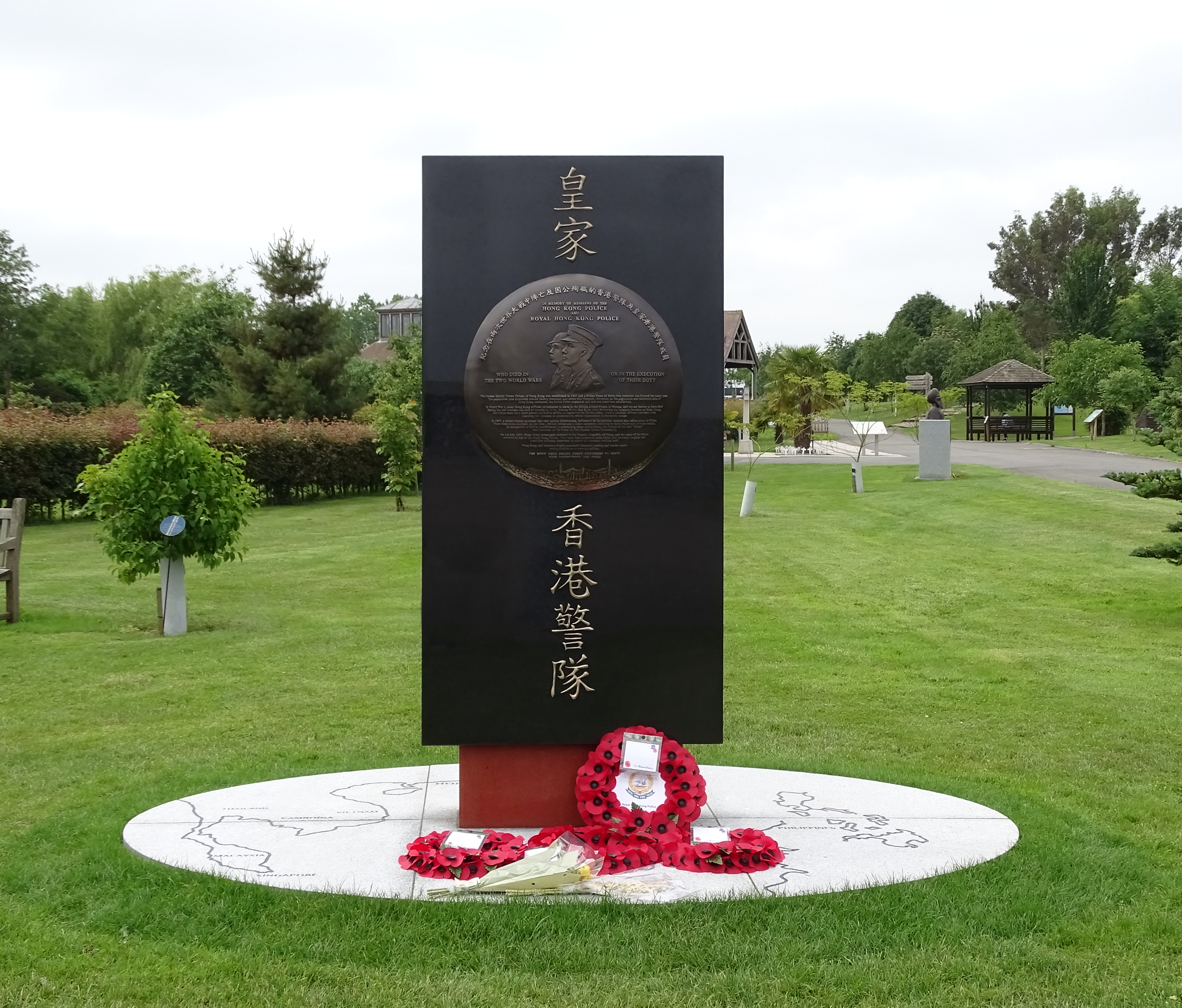
Memorial in the National Memorial Arboretum, England to RHKP members who served and died in the British armed forces during the Second World War. The names inscribed include British, Chinese, Indian, Muslim and Irish. The highest-ranked member is Assistant Superintendent David Loie Fook-wing, who was tortured and executed by the Japanese.

After the war, the mechanism of government in Hong Kong was in shambles; no men or equipment, devastated buildings and important resources like intelligence files, fingerprints, criminal records and personnel documents all lost or destroyed. The Water Police had four barely serviceable launches. Nevertheless, the situation presented an opportunity to "start from scratch" and after the 'British Military Administration', during which Colonel C.H. Sansom headed the force, Hong Kong was in a position to stand on its own feet again in May 1946.

When Japan invaded Hong Kong on 8 December 1941, the Commissioner of Police was John Pennefather-Evans, and through his wartime internment, he worked secretly to draft a conceptual plan for the reorganisation of the force, presenting his plan in July 1946. Although he was not to head the force after the war, his plans were both sound and progressive. Governor Sir Mark Young broadly supported them, and they were implemented under Commissioner Duncan Macintosh thereby generating the foundation of today's structure and philosophy. The proposals included equality in recruitment and promotion for local officers and the cessation of recruitment of European constables. Moreover, doubts about the willingness of the Hong Kong people to accept Indian officers who had worked, and often abused their authority under the Japanese administration (December 1941 until August 1945) forced authorities to wind down the Sikh contingent. Instead, Pakistani and Shandong Chinese were recruited as constables, and this went on until the early 1960s. The last European inspectorate officers joined in 1994. The first female inspector joined in 1949, followed by the first intake of Woman Police Constables in 1951 - currently about 14 percent of the force is female, being represented in all ranks between constable and assistant commissioner.

=== Second half of the century ===
In 1945, firefighting responsibilities passed to a separate fire brigade. The 1950s saw the start of Hong Kong's forty-year rise to global eminence. Throughout this period, the Hong Kong Police had successfully tackled many issues that had challenged the city's stability. Between 1949 and 1989, for example, Hong Kong experienced several huge waves of immigration from mainland China, most notably the period from 1958 to 1962.

The most serious challenge to the force has been civil disorder. In 1956, supporters of the China Nationalist movement defied government regulations providing the pretext for the eruption of conflict with pro-Communist activists and sympathisers - serious disorder was suppressed by the force with assistance from the British military. In 1966, Communist groups fanned the flames of discontent: Riots broke out over a price rise on the Star Ferry. Following this, in the spring of 1967, at the time of the Cultural Revolution in China, left-wing workers instigated long and bloody riots. The Hong Kong Police lost ten men during the turmoil which saw a ten-month campaign of insurrection, bombing and murder. For its determined and successful efforts in suppressing this lengthy insurrection, the Hong Kong Police were granted the "Royal" prefix in 1969. Princess Alexandra was appointed by Queen Elizabeth II to become the Commandant General of the Royal Hong Kong Police.

In 1961, the responsibility for immigration, customs, and excise duties passed out of the duties of the Hong Kong Police Force.

Corruption emerged as a prominent issue in Hong Kong in the 1960s; the Hong Kong Police—as did almost every government department—experienced this and it peaked between 1962 and 1974, involving officers of all ranks and ethnicities. Motives and opportunities for corruption were many and varied, but mainly included poor pay and worries about China invading and abolishing pensions, while opportunities resulted from the vibrant growth in economic progress and its industrious, self-starting people were forming thousands of small street-level businesses all ripe for "protection."

During this time, the police, along with members of departments like Public Works, Fire, Transport and others, all had their own distinct methods of earning illicit income to boost their meagre wages. Members of the police were offenders with the highest profile and took most opprobrium. It took the determined stance of Governor MacLehose, together with Commissioner Charles Payne Sutcliffe, to instigate the firmest of measures to eradicate syndicated corruption—and the establishment of the Independent Commission Against Corruption (ICAC) in 1974 was the prime one. After teething troubles, including a mass walkout by officers in 1977, by the early '80s a combination of the ICAC, firm police management, better emoluments and an amnesty had succeeded in destroying the overall culture, removing powerful figures, educating against greed and increasing instances of accountability.

In the 1970s and 1980s, large numbers of Vietnamese people arrived in Hong Kong, putting considerable strain on police resources – first for the marine police who intercepted them, then for the officers who processed them and manned the dozens of camps in the territory, and lastly for those who had to repatriate unsuccessful asylum applicants up until 1997.

On 1 July 1997, when China resumed sovereignty over Hong Kong, the "Royal" prefix was removed from the force's title, changing it to "Hong Kong Police Force". The crest was also changed, replacing the royal crown with a bauhinia emblem.

== 21st century ==
In April 2012, the Hong Kong Police Force publicly confirmed a ten-year contractual agreement with the 3M Cogent company to develop the biometric arm of the organization. Live scan technology and biometric identification products feature in the arrangement, and will be utilized in 32 city police force branches and three immigration locations.

In the 2010s, the police force played a prominent role in handling the 2014 Hong Kong protests and 2019–20 Hong Kong protests. The Hong Kong Police Force has faced allegations of misconduct, including the use of excessive force, in both the 2014 protests and the 2019 protests, leading to several lawsuits filed in October 2019 against the HKPF for allegations of misconduct. A range of controversies involving the police left the force's popularity plunging after 2014, but even more so after 2019.

Following Chris Tang's appointment as the Commissioner of Police in November 2019, the police force changed its motto from "We serve with pride and care", which had been used for more than 20 years, to "Serving Hong Kong with honour, duty and loyalty." The Economist suggested that this change would curry favour with the central government of China.

With the passage of the Hong Kong national security law in mid-2020, the force established a National Security Department, charged with investigating and arresting offenders for NSL violations. Edwina Lau, Deputy Commissioner of Police (National Security), is tasked to head the unit. The department's number 2, Frederic Choi, was caught by colleagues during an anti-vice raid on an unlicensed massage parlour in April 2021. The police later cleared him of "wrongdoing" but he remains on leave.

In November 2020, the Hong Kong Police Force launched a hotline where residents can report breaches of the national security law that China imposed earlier in the year.

In July 2022, following the 25th anniversary of the handover of Hong Kong to China, the force switched from its existing British-colonial drills to those used within the People's Republic of China with its stated purpose to "promote patriotism and enhance the awareness of national identity".

In August 2022, the Public Relations Wing announced that it would monitor public opinion online and fight "fake news".

== Evolution of uniforms ==
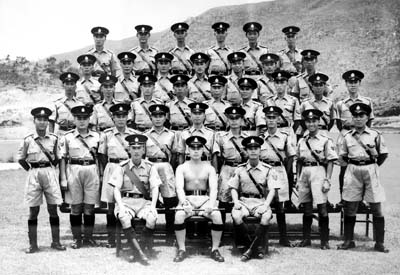
Police officers in summer uniform. Everything, except for the shorts, was used until about 2005.

The headgear worn during the 19th century varied according to ethnicity: European officers wore pith helmets, Sikh Indians wore turbans, and Chinese officers wore conical Asian hats. All of them, however, shared the same olive green tunics in winter - giving rise to the nickname, dai tau luk yee (big head, green coat). By 1900 dark blue had become standard, although the style and headdress still varied according to the race of the police officer. The conical hat of Chinese personnel disappeared after the 1920s, and similar khaki drill (summer) and navy blue uniforms (winter) were worn by all personnel. Both Chinese and European officers wore the same black peaked caps with silver badges. The Sikhs however continued to be distinguished by red turbans. White tunics were worn by police bandsmen and senior officers for ceremonial occasions.

While cap badges and other insignia changed with the ending of British rule, the basic khaki drill and navy blue uniforms of the colonial period remained in use. Up until about 2004, when a year-round blue uniform was adopted, the Hong Kong Police continued to wear two seasonal uniforms - a khaki drill summer uniform (tan for women officers) and a navy blue uniform for winter, with constables and sergeants wearing blue shirts and more senior staff wearing white ones.

== See also ==
- Historic police station buildings in Hong Kong
- Kam C. Wong, Policing in Hong Kong (Ashgate, 2012)
- Kam C. Wong. Policing in Hong Kong: History and Reform (CRC: Taylor and Francis, 2015)
