= National Security Department =

Hong Kong national security law enforcement agency since 2020

National Security Department 國家安全處
- Logo of the National Security Department
- Abbreviation: NS

Agency overview
- Formed: 1 July 2020

Jurisdictional structure
- Operations jurisdiction: Hong Kong
- Legal jurisdiction: Hong Kong
- Constituting instrument: Law of the People's Republic of China on Safeguarding National Security in the Hong Kong Special Administrative Region

Operational structure
- Overseen by: Committee for Safeguarding National Security
- Agency executive: Andrew Kan, Deputy Commissioner of Police
- Parent agency: Hong Kong Police Force

Website
- police.gov.hk/ns

National Security Department
- Traditional Chinese: 國家安全處
- Simplified Chinese: 国家安全处
Transcriptions
Standard Mandarin
- Hanyu Pinyin: Guójiā Ānquán Chù
Yue: Cantonese
- Jyutping: gwok3 gaa1 on1 cyun4 cyu3

The National Security Department (noted as NS) is the national security law enforcement unit within the Hong Kong Police Force. The unit was established in compliance with the Hong Kong national security law passed in June 2020.

The National Security Department is led by a Deputy Commissioner of Police, who is appointed by the Chief Executive of Hong Kong. The department may recruit from outside Hong Kong "to provide assistance in the performance of duties for safeguarding national security." The department is supervised by the Committee for Safeguarding National Security of the Government of Hong Kong and works with the Office for Safeguarding National Security.

== Duties ==
According to Article 17 of the National Security Law, the duties and functions of the department shall be:

1. collecting and analysing intelligence and information concerning national security;
2. planning, coordinating and enforcing measures and operations for safeguarding national security;
3. investigating offences endangering national security;
4. conducting counter-interference investigation and national security review;
5. carrying out tasks of safeguarding national security assigned by the Committee for Safeguarding National Security of the Hong Kong Special Administrative Region; and
6. performing other duties and functions necessary for the enforcement of this Law [national security law].

== Power ==
According to Article 43 of the National Security Law, the department is allowed to take the following actions:

1. search of premises, vehicles, vessels, aircraft and other relevant places and electronic devices that may contain evidence of an offence;
2. ordering any person suspected of having committed an offence endangering national security to surrender travel documents, or prohibiting the person concerned from leaving the Region;
3. freezing of, applying for restraint order, charging order and confiscation order in respect of, and forfeiture of property used or intended to be used for the commission of the offence, proceeds of crime, or other property relating to the commission of the offence;
4. requiring a person who published information or the relevant service provider to delete the information or provide assistance;
5. requiring a political organisation of a foreign country or outside the mainland, Hong Kong and Macao of the People's Republic of China, or an agent of authorities or a political organisation of a foreign country or outside the mainland, Hong Kong and Macao of the People's Republic of China, to provide information;
6. upon approval of the Chief Executive, carrying out interception of communications and conducting covert surveillance on a person who is suspected, on reasonable grounds, of having involved in the commission of an offence endangering national security; and
7. requiring a person, who is suspected, on reasonable grounds, of having in possession information or material relevant to investigation, to answer questions and furnish such information or produce such material.

The National Security Department is given unprecedented power of bypassing Interception of Communications and Surveillance Ordinance to intercept communication of and monitor anyone suspected of endangering the national security. Warrants from courts are no longer needed for the department to search any premises with possible criminal evidence. Furthermore, the department is responsible for vetting candidates for elections after the election change imposed by the Chinese Government.

== Leadership ==
Head of National Security Department

Also Deputy Commissioner of Police (National Security)

- Edwina Lau (3 July 2020 – 29 April 2023)
- Andrew Kan (2 May 2023 – 22 September 2026)
- Kelvin Kong (22 September 2026 – Incumbent)

Director of National Security

Also Senior Assistant Commissioner of Police

- Frederic Choi (3 July 2020 – 11 August 2021)
- Andrew Kan (December 2021 – 2 May 2023)
- Kelvin Kong (2 May 2023 – 22 September 2026)

== Operations ==
The National Security Department has accused and arrested dissenting voices in Hong Kong for "endangering" the national security, including pro-democracy politicians and protestors. Some websites were also reportedly banned by the department, including Hong Kong Watch.

Police in the department had to be vetted to review the allegiance and loyalty to China, non-disclosure agreements are signed also.

Senior police of the department has been sanctioned by the United States, including Edwina Lau, Frederic Choi, for their role in enforcing the NSL.

According to Ming Pao, police from the NSD regularly, sometimes monthly, met the activists to learn of their latest activities. One claimed he was contacted four times by the security police within one month, warning them any movement on "special days" could lead to arrest. These meetings increased significantly in 2023, as members of NGOs and former local councillors were approached for the first time.

In December 2022, in the case against Stand News, it was revealed that officers from the National Security Department had archived 587 articles from the website, sought prosecutors' advice on 30 of them, and then discarded the remaining articles. The defense argued that a fair trial would be impossible, since evidence was destroyed. An officer, Fung Siu-man, told the court that only national security police had access to a Facebook account under the fake name of "Tang Kee." An officer who used the account left a Facebook comment, saying "Even if [the primaries] did not violate any laws, God will not let you off," to which people in the court laughed at.

In May 2023, the department confiscated from storage the Pillar of Shame commemorating victims of the Tiananmen Square crackdown. It cited an ongoing case under investigation. The sculpture was on exhibit at the University of Hong Kong before campus authorities removed it in 2021 and placed it in storage at the university's Kadoorie Centre.

== Impersonation incident ==
In 2022, journalists and members of the legal team representing media tycoon Jimmy Lai internationally received threatening messages purportedly from the Security Bureau and the national security wing of the Hong Kong Police Force. The Hong Kong police issued a statement condemning acts of impersonation and asked for more information from those involved in order to follow up on the incident.

== See also ==
- Hong Kong national security Law
- List of Hong Kong national security cases
- Committee for Safeguarding National Security
- Office for Safeguarding National Security
