= Committee for Safeguarding National Security =

Hong Kong security committee

Committee for Safeguarding National Security of the Hong Kong Special Administrative Region
- 香港特別行政區維護國家安全委員會
- Emblem of Hong Kong

Agency overview
- Formed: 3 July 2020
- Jurisdiction: Government of the Hong Kong Special Administrative Region
- Agency executives: John Lee, Chairperson; Sonny Au, Secretary-General; Zheng Yanxiong, National Security Adviser
- Parent department: State Council of the People's Republic of China
- Parent agency: Central People's Government; Central National Security Commission of the Chinese Communist Party

Committee for Safeguarding National Security

Committee for Safeguarding National Security of the Hong Kong Special Administrative Region
- Traditional Chinese: 香港特別行政區維護國家安全委員會
- Simplified Chinese: 香港特别行政区维护国家安全委员会
Transcriptions
Standard Mandarin
- Hanyu Pinyin: Xiānggǎng tèbié xíngzhèngqū wéihù guójiā ānquán wěiyuánhuì
Yue: Cantonese
- Jyutping: hoeng1 gong2 dak6 bit6 hang4 zing3 keoi1 wai4 wu6 gwok3 gaa1 on1 cyun4 wai2 jyun4 wui6*2

Committee for National Security in HKSAR
- Traditional Chinese: 港區國安委
- Simplified Chinese: 港区国安委
Transcriptions
Standard Mandarin
- Hanyu Pinyin: Gǎngqū guóānwěi
Yue: Cantonese
- Jyutping: gong2 keoi1 gwok3 on1 wai2

The Committee for Safeguarding National Security of the Hong Kong Special Administrative Region (CSNS) is a national security committee established by the Government of Hong Kong under the Article 12 of the Hong Kong national security law. The committee is supervised and accountable to the Central People's Government of China.

The committee is chaired by the Chief Executive, as stated in the Article 13 of the law. The committee's other members are the Chief Secretary for Administration, the Financial Secretary, the Secretary for Justice, the Secretary for Security, the Commissioner of Police, the head of the National Security Department of the Hong Kong Police Force, the Director of Immigration, the Commissioner of Customs and Excise, and the Director of the Chief Executive's Office.

== History ==
On 2 July 2020, Eric Chan was appointed as secretary-general of the committee.

On 3 July 2020, a Hong Kong government spokesperson stated that the Committee for Safeguarding National Security of the Hong Kong Special Administrative Region was formally established with Carrie Lam as chairwoman and Eric Chan as secretary-general. The other members are Matthew Cheung Kin-chung (Chief Secretary for Administration), Paul Chan Mo-po (Financial Secretary), Teresa Cheng (Secretary for Justice), John Lee Ka-chiu (Secretary for Security), Chris Tang (Commissioner of Hong Kong Police Force), Edwina Lau Chi-wai (Deputy Commissioner of Hong Kong Police Force and the head of the Department for safeguarding national security of the Hong Kong Police Force), Au Ka-wang (Director of Immigration), and Hermes Tang Yi-hoi (Commissioner of Customs and Excise). Also on 3 July 2020, Luo Huining, the director of the Liaison Office was appointed by the State Council to the role of the committee's National Security Adviser. The creation of this post is stipulated by Article 15 of the national security law. The Australian Strategic Policy Institute opined that the post now appeared to be the most powerful position in Hong Kong.

The committee convened its first meeting on 6 July 2020.

Carrie Lam, Eric Chan, Teresa Cheng, John Lee, Chris Tang, and Luo Huining were among those sanctioned by the United States Treasury in August 2020 pursuant to the Normalization Executive Order (Executive Order 13936). The order had been issued by US President Donald Trump on 14 July in response to the imposition of the national security law. Edwina Lau was sanctioned by the US on 9 November as one of four more officials.

In January 2023, the committee said that the law in Hong Kong should be changed to ban overseas lawyers from national security cases. This came after Jimmy Lai had attempted to hire Tim Owen as his lawyer, and a subsequent approval in December 2022 by the Standing Committee of the National People's Congress of an interpretation – not in relation to a Lai's case – that the chief executive and the committee had the final say in whether overseas lawyers could be admitted in national security cases.

== Membership ==
According to the Hong Kong national security law, the Committee comprises the following ex-officio members:

- Chief Executive (as the chairman)
- Chief Secretary for Administration
- Financial Secretary
- Secretary for Justice
- Secretary for Security
- Commissioner of Police
- Deputy Commissioner of Police (National Security)
- Director of Immigration
- Commissioner of Customs and Excise
- Director of the Chief Executive's Office

The committee also includes a secretary-general and a national security adviser. The secretary-general heads the secretariat under the committee and is appointed by the Central People's Government upon nomination by the Chief Executive. The National Security Adviser is appointed by the Central People's Government to "provide advice on matters relating to the duties and functions of the Committee".

== Duties and functions of the Committee ==
Article 14 of the Hong Kong national security law specifies three duties and functions of the committee:

- Analysing and assessing developments in relation to safeguarding national security in the Hong Kong Special Administrative Region, making work plans, and formulating policies for safeguarding national security in the Region;
- advancing the development of the legal system and enforcement mechanisms of the Region for safeguarding national security; and
- coordinating major work and significant operations for safeguarding national security in the Region.

Article 14 further states: "No institution, organisation or individual in the Region shall interfere with the work of the Committee.", and that its decisions are not amenable to judicial review. Article 18 specifies that prosecutors of the division "for the prosecution of offences endangering national security and other related legal work" – established by the same law – have to be approved by the committee prior to their appointment by the Secretary of Justice.

Article 43 stipulates that the committee supervises the implementation of the powers which law enforcement agencies, including the Hong Kong Police force, have under the national security law.

=== Candidate eligibility review ===
In March 2021, after the National People's Congress passed a decision to only allow "patriots" to serve in the government, the committee added a new responsibility; it will make decisions on the suitability of candidates for elections. As laid out in Annexes I and II of the Basic Law as amended by the Standing Committee of the National People's Congress, it will do so through making a recommendation to the Candidate Eligibility Review Committee (CERC). The CERC was established on 6 July 2021.

Under the amended Annexes of the Basic Law, a Candidate Eligibility Review mechanism is established to review and confirm of eligibility of candidates for the Election Committee, Chief Executive and Legislative Council elections, consisting of the following steps:

- Review by the department for safeguarding national security of the Hong Kong Police Force on whether a candidate meets the legal requirements and conditions of upholding the Basic Law and swearing allegiance to HKSAR of PRC;
- the Committee for Safeguarding National Security of the Hong Kong Special Administrative Region issues opinion in respect of a candidate who fails to meet such legal requirements and conditions on the basis of the police review; and
- Review and Confirmation of eligibility of candidates by the Candidate Eligibility Review Committee of the HKSAR.

On 26 August 2021, lawmaker Cheng Chung-tai was disqualified from his ex officio membership in the Election Committee in the vetting process, thereby losing his Legislative Council membership.

== National Security Exhibition Gallery ==
In 2024, the Committee for Safeguarding National Security opened an exhibition about the Chinese Communist Party and the Hong Kong national security law in the Hong Kong Museum of History, separate from the museum but in the same building. The latter says the 2019 Hong Kong protests resulted from "subversion" by "certain countries." This brought "dire straits" and "an abyss" to Hong Kong, it adds (see photo).

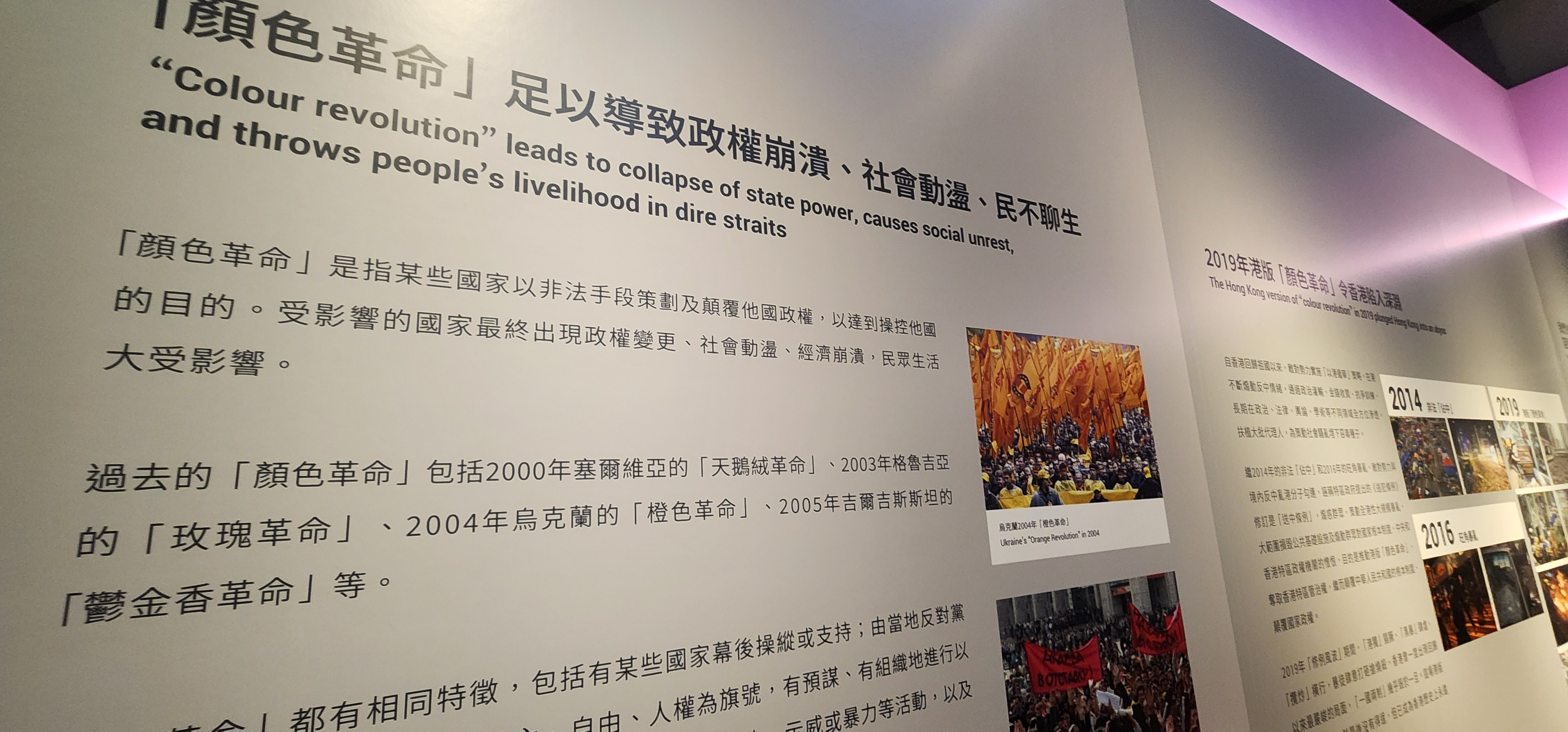
The national security exhibit says the 2019 protests resulted from "subversion" by "certain countries." This brought "dire straits" and "an abyss" to Hong Kong.

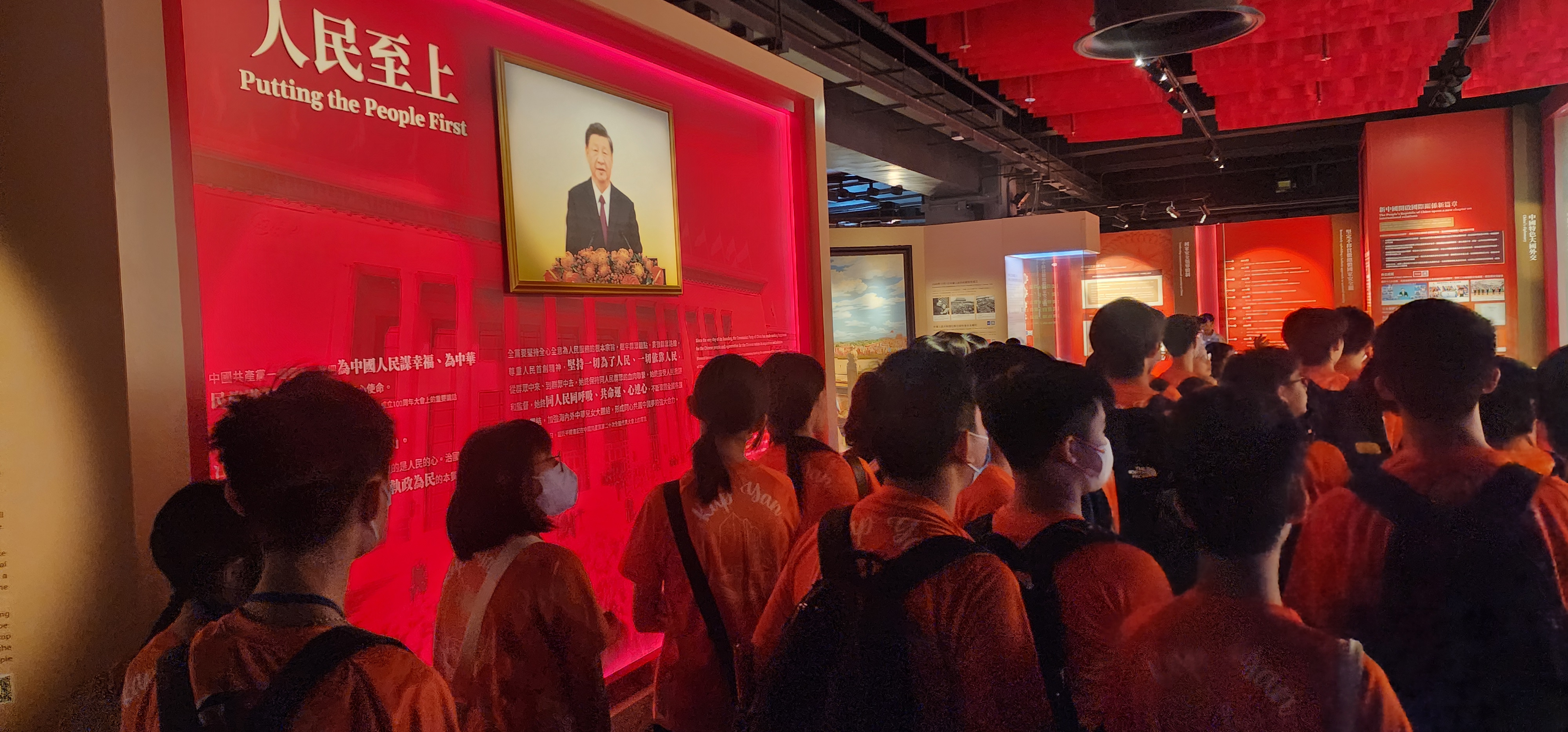
Hong Kong high school students taken to see the exhibit on the national security law

== See also ==
- National Security Commission of the Chinese Communist Party
