= Andrew Kan Kai-yan =

Hong Kong law enforcement administrator

- Traditional Chinese: 簡啟恩
- Simplified Chinese: 简启恩
Transcriptions
Standard Mandarin
- Hanyu Pinyin: Jiǎn Qǐ'ēn
Yue: Cantonese
- Jyutping: gaan2 kai2 jan1

Andrew Kan Kai-yan PDSM PMSM (Chinese: 簡啟恩) is a deputy commissioner of the Hong Kong Police Force and a law enforcement administrator who has been serving as the director of the National Security Department of the Hong Kong Police Force since May 2023.

== Career ==
Kan joined the Royal Hong Kong Police in 1991 as an inspector.

In December 2021, he was appointed as the Director of National Security and promoted to senior assistant commissioner, replacing Frederic Choi.

In May 2023, he was appointed as the director of the National Security Department and promoted to deputy commissioner. He retired from the post in September 2026, and was succeeded by Kelvin Kong.

=== Sanctions ===
On 15 January 2021, Kan was sanctioned by the government of the United States under Executive Order 13936 for his role in implementing the National Security Law.
