= Kelvin Kong Hok-lai =

Hong Kong police official

- Traditional Chinese: 江學禮
- Simplified Chinese: 江学礼
Transcriptions
Standard Mandarin
- Hanyu Pinyin: Jiāng Xuélǐ
Yue: Cantonese
- Jyutping: gong1 hok6 lai5

Kelvin Kong Hok-lai (Chinese: 江學禮) is an official in the National Security Division of the Hong Kong Police Force.

== Sanctions ==
On 15 January 2021, Kong was sanctioned by the United States under Executive Order 13936 for his role in implementing the National Security Law.

Less than a month after being sanctioned, Kong paid off his mortgages at The RiverPark in Sha Tin.
