= Edwina Lau =

Hong Kong police official

Edwina Lau Chi-wai SBS PDSM PMSM

Deputy Commissioner of Police (National Security) Hong Kong Police Force
- Incumbent
- Assumed office 3 July 2020

Personal details
- Born: 29 July 1965 (age 60)
- Occupation: Law enforcement administrator

Edwina Lau Chi-wai, PMSM (Chinese: 劉賜蕙; Jyutping: lau4 ci3 wai6, born 29 July 1965) is a Hong Kong law enforcement administrator currently serving as the head of the National Security Department of the Hong Kong Police Force while also sitting on the Committee for Safeguarding National Security.

== Career ==
According to an official biography, Lau joined the Royal Hong Kong Police in 1984 and served in various roles relating to narcotics, fraud, commercial crime, human resources management, police training, and police command. She has served as an assistant commissioner of police, regional commander of New Territories South, and as assistant commissioner of personnel.

Lau also formerly served as director of the Hong Kong Police College. In 2015, she was awarded the Police Medal for Meritorious Service.

In March 2019, Lau became a senior assistant commissioner of police, overseeing the work of the Service Quality Wing and the Information Systems Wing.

In 2020, she was appointed Deputy Commissioner of Police (National Security). She took her oath of office, which was witnessed by Carrie Lam, on 3 July 2020.

On 10 February 2021, Carrie Lam awarded Lau the Chief Executive's Commendation for Government/Public Service for her "significant contribution to safeguarding national security and the implementation of the Hong Kong National Security Law".

In February 2023, Lau said there were "local extremists... hidden in the community" and that they "continue to disseminate seditious and false information on different platforms to instigate others to break the law."

== Sanctions ==
On 9 November 2020, Lau was sanctioned by the United States under Executive Order 13936 for her role in implementing the National Security Law. Lau responded that she was unfazed by the sanctions and will continue to safeguard Hong Kong and national security. She also called the sanctions "futile".
