= Frederic Choi =

Hong Kong police official

Frederic Choi PDSM
- 蔡展鵬

Director of National Security Hong Kong Police Force
- In office 1 July 2020 – 11 August 2020
- Head: Edwina Lau
- Succeeded by: Andrew Kan

Personal details
- Born: 28 August 1970 (age 56) British Hong Kong
- Education: Hong Kong Baptist University (BSS)
- Awards: Police Distinguished Service Medal (2020); Chief Executive's Commendation for Government and Public Service (2021)

Frederic Choi
- Traditional Chinese: 蔡展鵬
- Simplified Chinese: 蔡展鹏
Transcriptions
Standard Mandarin
- Hanyu Pinyin: Cài Zhǎnpéng
Yue: Cantonese
- Jyutping: coi3 zin2 paang4

Frederic Choi Chin-pang PDSM (Chinese: 蔡展鵬; born 28 August 1970) is a former director of the National Security Division of the Hong Kong Police Force. He was sanctioned by the United States in early 2021 for his role in implementing the Hong Kong national security law. Choi was suspended from the police force in May 2021 after reportedly being caught in a raid at an unlicensed massage parlour.

== Early life ==
Choi was born on 28 August 1970 in Hong Kong. He studied at Hong Kong Baptist University, graduating with a bachelor of social sciences in China studies in 1992.

== Career ==
Choi joined the Royal Hong Kong Police in 1995 as an inspector. He was promoted to senior superintendent in 2014. He was promoted again to chief superintendent in 2017, and to assistant commissioner in January 2019, commanding the police force's security wing.

In July 2020, following the passage of the Hong Kong national security law, Choi was promoted to the rank of senior assistant commissioner and was tasked with commanding the National Security Department of the Hong Kong Police Force.

In May 2021, he was placed on leave pending investigation for alleged misconduct. The police force did not provide details. However, the South China Morning Post reported that Choi had been caught in a raid on an unlicensed massage parlour. The venue was later revealed to be Viet Spa, on Johnston Road in Wan Chai. In October 2021, a judge ruled that prosecutors (led by Claudia Ko Hoi-yee), charging the massage parlour's managers, had heavily edited the CCTV footage to hide Choi's face, and forced the prosecutors to provide the unedited footage. The defense lawyers for the managers had asked for the unedited footage to see if Choi was a regular customer. Besides the CCTV footage, the prosecutors had also withheld Choi's police statements.

In August 2022, Choi testified that he had visited the massage parlour 4 to 5 times from 2020 to 2021, and claimed he never received any sexual services. Choi also said he was not offered any sexual services, and never saw any such services either.

== Sanctions ==
On 15 January 2021, Choi was sanctioned by the United States under Executive Order 13936 for his role in regards to the National Security Law.

== Decorations ==
Choi was awarded the Police Medal for Distinguished Service in 2020 in recognition of "his outstanding performance and dedicated service in the Hong Kong Police Force for over 25 years".

On 10 February 2021, Choi and other police officials sanctioned by the United States were awarded the Chief Executive's Commendation for Government and Public Service by Chief Executive Carrie Lam (who herself was also sanctioned).

== Personal life ==
According to an official biography, Choi holds master's degrees in human rights law and public policy and management.

In March 2021, it was reported that he owned a fully paid-off flat in Fo Tan then valued at HK$13.09 million.
