= Property owned by the Central People's Government in Hong Kong =

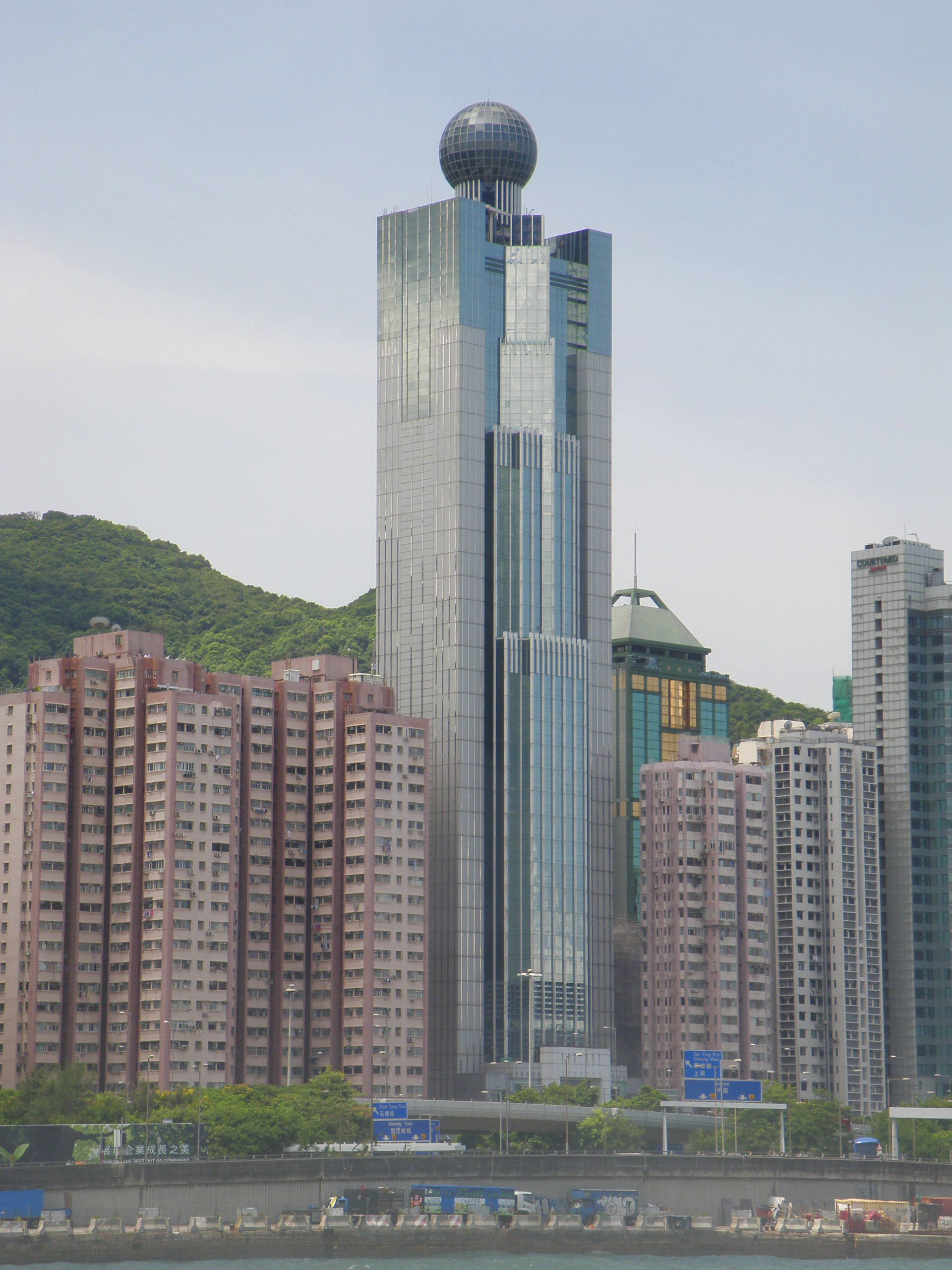
The Westpoint, which is owned by the Hong Kong Liaison Office

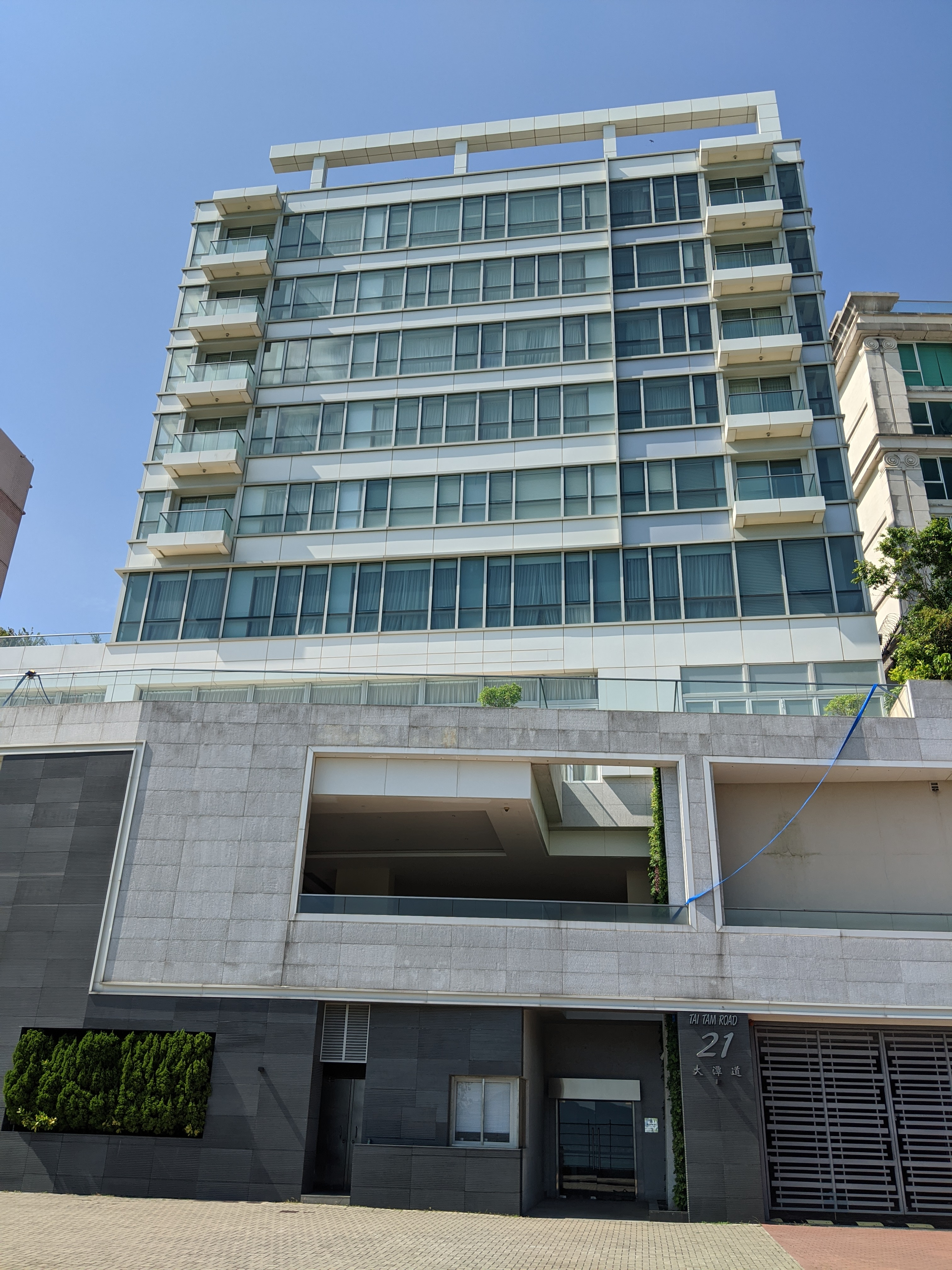
21 Tai Tam Road, Senior staff residences of the Hong Kong Liaison Office

The Central People's Government of China owns and operates numerous properties in Hong Kong. The central government operates four offices in Hong Kong, which are the Liaison Office, the Hong Kong Garrison, the Office of the Foreign Affairs Commissioner, and the Office for Safeguarding National Security.

== Ministry of Commerce ==
Though the Ministry of Commerce of the People's Republic of China is not one of the 3 organs of the CPG in Hong Kong, it purchased 8 properties in the 2015 financial year, with 3 in the Southern District and 5 in the Eastern District. The total unlevied stamp duty amounted to $3.6M HKD.

== Ministry of Foreign Affairs ==
The Office of the Commissioner of the Ministry of Foreign Affairs is located at 42 Kennedy Road. It also operates the Visa Division of the Consular Department of the Commissioner's Office at 3/F, China Resources Building, 26 Harbor Road for those who hold diplomatic passports or are entering the People's Republic of China for diplomatic purposes.

Next to the 42 Kennedy Road office and connected via foot bridge is the 25 floor residential tower of the Ministry of Foreign Affairs, located at 6 Borrett Road, which includes a tennis court. At 6A Borrett Road, in a separate and newly constructed building, is the official residence of the Commissioner.

== Border Defense Corps ==
The Border Defence Corps is not one of the 3 organs of the CPG in Hong Kong. In 2018, it was discovered that the Border Defence Corps (then part of the People's Armed Police, now part of the Ministry of Public Security) had diverted a river in 2013 in New Territories, near Sha Tau Kok, changing the border and occupying 21,000 sq ft of space that belongs to four Hong Kong landowners. None of the landowners were informed by either the mainland or Hong Kong governments, with the Hong Kong government claiming that they had no knowledge of the river diversion. Instead of rectifying the issue, the Hong Kong Lands Department told one of the landowners that he should sue the People's Liberation Army (PLA) instead.

== Office for Safeguarding National Security ==
The Office for Safeguarding National Security is located in the former Metropark Hotel Causeway Bay building. It was previously owned by China Travel Service, another branch of the mainland Chinese government. The building serves as both the office and living quarters for its employees.

In April 2021, the Office announced that it was taking over the Island Pacific Hotel in Sai Ying Pun as an additional work site. Also, it announced a third site via constructing its permanent headquarters at Tai Kok Tsui.

In November 2022, the Office bought a 7,171 sqft 5-bedroom mansion in Beacon Hill for HK$508 million. The South China Morning Post reported that the unit is Villa 1 of Mont Rouge.

== PLA Hong Kong Garrison ==
Upon the handover of Hong Kong, 18 sites of the British forces were transferred to the People's Liberation Army, and one (the Central Military Dock) was added in to make a total of 19 sites, as defined in the Military Installations Closed Areas Order. In 2014, citing recent media reports, legislator Kenneth Chan asked the government about a suspected 20th site, a radar installation at Tai Mo Shan; Garrison Law requires the public to be informed about the opening of new sites. The government stated that the relevant area was not one of the 19 military sites, and pointed to the legal obligation of the government to support the Hong Kong Garrison while saying that details on Hong Kong operations could generally not be given due to military secrecy considerations. In January 2021, in response to reports of Chinese Communist Party slogans on the radome surfacing, as well as photos of a PLA vehicle and a soldier in PLA uniform, the Hong Kong government for the first time spoke of the building as housing telecommunication devices for defence purposes.

In December 2017, a Reuters article reported that many of the military sites were underused. Some lawmakers and activists suggested that the land be returned to the city to build housing.

20 Sites of the Hong Kong Garrison
Location	Number	Name	Comments
Hong Kong Island	1	Central Barracks	
Hong Kong Island	2	Central Military Dock	150 meter strip along the Central harbourfront, intended to be used for a military dock. Construction is currently being opposed
Hong Kong Island	3	Chek Chue Barracks	
Hong Kong Island	4	Headquarters House	
Hong Kong Island	5	Ching Yi To Barracks	
Hong Kong Island	6	Western Barracks	88 Bonham Road - formerly named the Bonham Tower Barracks
Kowloon	7	Gun Club Hill Barracks	
Kowloon	8	Kowloon East Barracks	
Kowloon	9	1A, Cornwall Street	Unused. This was the former Air Commander's residence, located at the junction of Cornwall St and Devon St in Kowloon Tong
Kowloon	10	Ngong Shuen Chau Barracks	
New Territories	11	Shek Kong Barracks	Includes the Northern and Southern compounds, as well as the airfield
New Territories	12	Shek Kong Village	
New Territories	13	San Tin Barracks	Formerly known as Cassino Lines
New Territories	14	Tam Mei Barracks	Located in Ngau Tam Mei in Yuen Long
New Territories	15	San Wai Barracks	
New Territories	16	San Wai/Tai Ling Firing Range	
New Territories	17	Tsing Shan Firing Range	
New Territories	18	Tai O Barracks	
New Territories	19	Military Transportation Centre at Chek Lap Kok	Located at Catering Road West, near the airport. Also called the "Joint Movement Unit"
New Territories	20	Radar Installation at Tai Mo Shan	First suspected in 2014; confirmed in January 2021 as serving defence purposes although not included in the government list of military sites

== Liaison Office and Newman Investment ==
Though the Liaison Office is headquartered at The Westpoint, the Liaison Office has purchased other offices and a significant number of residential apartments in Hong Kong. In an unusual setup, Newman Investment Co Ltd, a private company, has been identified as a subsidiary of the Liaison Office. Purchases of property have been done both through the Liaison Office and through Newman Investment.

Although Newman Investment is a private company and is not registered as an incorporated public officer, which would qualify it from not paying stamp duties under section 41(1) of the Stamp Duty Ordinance, Hong Kong Chief Executives have, under section 52(1) of the SDO, have allowed Newman Investment to not pay stamp duties. This has allowed Newman Investment to escape stamp duties of approximately 150 million HKD between 2012 and 2020.

For the past several years, several District Council members have asked the government for a detailed breakdown of property owned by the Liaison Office and Newman Investment, as well as the reasoning for Newman Investment, a private company, to escape paying stamp duties. The government has consistently only given brief summarised results, hiding details on the transactions. For example, in March 2019, Kenneth Leung, a Legislative Council member, asked for details from the Secretary for Financial Services and the Treasury, James Lau, only to be given summarised results.

Table of Unlevied Stamp Duties in Recent Years
Financial Year	Organisation	Stamp Duty Involved (HKD)	# of Properties Involved	Locations
2012-13	Newman	$1,900,000	15	TBD
2013-14		0	0	
2014-15	Liaison Office	$52,300,000	6	5 (Kwun Tong) 1 (Central and Western)
2015-16	Newman	$15,600,000	15	5 (Central and Western) 10 (Sha Tin)
2016-17	Newman	$8,400,000	8	6 (Central and Western) 2 (Kowloon City)
2017-18		0	0	
2018-19	Newman	$47,900,000	25	23 (Central and Western) 2 (Sha Tin)
2019-20	Newman	$80,400,000	22	2 (Central and Western) 20 (Kwun Tong)

=== Newman Investment Company Information ===
Companies in Hong Kong are required to fill out a NAR1 Annual Return form every year, and submit it to the Companies Registry. For a small fee, anybody can perform a lookup on any registered company. In Newman Investment's February 2020 Annual Return (NAR1), it lists the Company Secretary as Xiao Xiaosan, and the four remaining directors as Chen Zhibin, Li Xuhong, Sun Zhongxin, and Chen Dunzhou. According to SCMP, directors of Newman have been officials from the Liaison Office's Administration and Finance Department.

=== Residential Properties ===
In April 2020, Demosisto distributed a press release and map, showing the extent of property purchases by the Liaison Office and Newman Investment. In the press release, it was shown that as of the end of February 2019, 722 residential units had been purchased, with 156 purchased by the Liaison Office, and the remaining 566 purchased through Newman Investment. Of the 566 properties purchased by Newman, 542 were found with an exact address, and the remaining 24 have no exact address that could be found by Demosisto.

Demosisto Report Appendix 1 - Residential Properties. Excludes 24 properties whose specific addresses could not be found.
Demosisto Map ID	District	Address (English)	Address (Chinese)	# of Units	# of Rooms	Specific Address (Chinese)	Purchase Price (HKD)	Purchase Year	Owner	Notes
45	Kwun Tong	Grand Central 33 Hip Wo Street	凱滙高層EFGHL	20	41	凱滙高層 L、H、E、F、G 室	$247,532,000	2019	Newman	
44	Wan Chai	41-43 Village Road	山村道41-43號	22	42	山村道41-43號	$2,545,760	1992	Newman	Purchase included the entire building and land
43	Central and Western	The Belcher's Block 2 89 Pok Fu Lam Road	寶翠園2座高層D室	1	2	寶翠園2座中層 D 室	$17,200,000	2018	Newman	
42	Sha Tin	City One - Shatin Block 24 1 Tak Kei Street	沙田第一城06期 24座中層B	1	2	沙田第一城 06期 24座中層 B 室	$6,200,000	2017	Newman	
41	Central and Western	The Merton Tower 2 38 New Praya Kennedy Town	泓都 2座 高層DE	1	2	泓都02座高層 D 室	$8,560,000	2017	Newman	
41	Central and Western	The Merton Tower 2 38 New Praya Kennedy Town	泓都 2座 高層DE	1	2	泓都02座高層 D 室	$8,600,000	2017	Newman	
41	Central and Western	The Merton Tower 2 38 New Praya Kennedy Town	泓都 2座 高層DE	1	2	泓都02座高層 D 室	$8,640,000	2017	Newman	
41	Central and Western	The Merton Tower 2 38 New Praya Kennedy Town	泓都 2座 高層DE	1	2	泓都02座高層 E 室	$8,380,000	2017	Newman	
41	Central and Western	The Merton Tower 2 38 New Praya Kennedy Town	泓都 2座 高層DE	1	2	泓都02座高層 D 室	$8,720,000	2017	Newman	
41	Central and Western	The Merton Tower 2 38 New Praya Kennedy Town	泓都 2座 高層DE	1	2	泓都02座高層 E 室	$8,440,000	2017	Newman	
41	Central and Western	The Merton Tower 2 38 New Praya Kennedy Town	泓都 2座 高層DE	1	2	泓都02座高層 D 室	$8,780,000	2017	Newman	
41	Central and Western	The Merton Tower 2 38 New Praya Kennedy Town	泓都 2座 高層DE	1	2	泓都02座高層 E 室	$8,500,000	2017	Newman	
41	Central and Western	The Merton Tower 2 38 New Praya Kennedy Town	泓都 2座 高層DE	1	2	泓都02座高層 D 室	$8,840,000	2017	Newman	
41	Central and Western	The Merton Tower 2 38 New Praya Kennedy Town	泓都 2座 高層DE	1	2	泓都02座高層 E 室	$8,560,000	2017	Newman	
41	Central and Western	The Merton Tower 2 38 New Praya Kennedy Town	泓都 2座 高層DE	1	2	泓都02座高層 D 室	$8,880,000	2017	Newman	
41	Central and Western	The Merton Tower 2 38 New Praya Kennedy Town	泓都 2座 高層DE	1	2	泓都02座高層 D 室	$8,960,000	2017	Newman	
41	Central and Western	The Merton Tower 2 38 New Praya Kennedy Town	泓都 2座 高層DE	1	2	泓都02座高層 E 室	$8,680,000	2017	Newman	
41	Central and Western	The Merton Tower 2 38 New Praya Kennedy Town	泓都 2座 高層DE	1	2	泓都02座高層 D 室	$8,980,000	2017	Newman	
40	Central and Western	Connaught Garden Block 1 155 Connaught Road West	高樂花園01座高層ABC	1	2	高樂花園 01座中層 C 室	$5,300,000	2017	Newman	
40	Central and Western	Connaught Garden Block 1 155 Connaught Road West	高樂花園01座高層ABC	1	2	高樂花園 01座中層 A 室	$6,075,000	2017	Newman	
40	Central and Western	Connaught Garden Block 1 155 Connaught Road West	高樂花園01座高層ABC	1	2	高樂花園 01座高層 B 室	$5,000,000	2016	Newman	
40	Central and Western	Connaught Garden Block 1 155 Connaught Road West	高樂花園01座高層ABC	1	2	高樂花園 01座高層 C 室	$4,950,000	2016	Newman	
40	Central and Western	Connaught Garden Block 1 155 Connaught Road West	高樂花園01座高層ABC	1	2	高樂花園 01座高層 C 室	$4,980,000	2016	Newman	
39	Kwun Tong	Telford Gardens Block J 33 Wai Yip Street	德福花園J座低層03	1	2	德福花園 J 座低層03室	$5,250,000	2016	Newman	
38	Kwun Tong	Telford Gardens Block N 33 Wai Yip Street	德福花園N座中層06	1	2	德福花園 N 座中層06室	$5,270,000	2016	Newman	
37	Central and Western	Connaught Garden Block 3 155 Connaught Road West	高樂花園03座低層EFGH	1	2	高樂花園 03座高層 F 室	$4,980,000	2016	Newman	
37	Central and Western	Connaught Garden Block 3 155 Connaught Road West	高樂花園03座低層EFGH	1	2	高樂花園 03座中層 G 室	$4,800,000	2016	Newman	
37	Central and Western	Connaught Garden Block 3 155 Connaught Road West	高樂花園03座低層EFGH	1	2	高樂花園 03座低層 H 室	$4,850,000	2016	Newman	
37	Central and Western	Connaught Garden Block 3 155 Connaught Road West	高樂花園03座低層EFGH	1	2	高樂花園 03座低層 G	$5,500,000	2015	Newman	
37	Central and Western	Connaught Garden Block 3 155 Connaught Road West	高樂花園03座低層EFGH	1	2	高樂花園 03座高層 E	$5,100,000	2015	Newman	
36	Central and Western	Connaught Garden Block 2 155 Connaught Road West	高樂花園 02座高層D	1	2	高樂花園 02座高層 D	$4,900,000	2015	Newman	
35	Sha Tin	City One - Shatin Block 10 1 Tak Kei Street	沙田第一城01期10座高層F	1	3	沙田第一城01期10座高層 F 室	$6,200,000	2017	Newman	
34	Sha Tin	City One - Shatin Block 45 7 Tak Po Street	沙田第一城04期45座中層及高層B	1	2	沙田第一城 04期 45座高層 B	$4,150,000	2015	Newman	Discrepancy; Demosisto press release states 1 unit and 2 rooms purchased for $4,150,000 in 2015, while their map states that 2 units and 4 rooms were purchased for $10,350,000 total in 2015 and 2017
33	Sha Tin	City One - Shatin Block 44 5 Tak Po Street	沙田第一城04期44座中層B	1	2	沙田第一城 04期 44座低層 B	$4,180,000	2015	Newman	
32	Sha Tin	City One - Shatin Block 41 10 Pak Tak Street	沙田第一城04期41座高層H	1	2	沙田第一城 04期 41座中層 H	$4,480,000	2015	Newman	
31	Sha Tin	City One - Shatin Block 40 14 Pak Tak Street	沙田第一城 04期 40座中層F	1	2	沙田第一城 04期 40座中層 F	$4,250,000	2015	Newman	
30	Sha Tin	City One - Shatin Block 38 11 Lok Shing Street	沙田第一城04期38座中層E	1	2	沙田第一城 04期 38座中層 E	$4,100,000	2015	Newman	
29	Sha Tin	City One - Shatin Block 37 9 Lok Shing Street	沙田第一城04期37座中層F	1	2	沙田第一城 04期 37座中層 F	$4,150,000	2015	Newman	
28	Sha Tin	City One - Shatin Block 29 2 Tak Kei Street	沙田第一城03期29座中層F	1	3	沙田第一城 03期 29座中層 F	$6,060,000	2015	Newman	
27	Sha Tin	City One - Shatin Block 20 1 Tak Kei Street	沙田第一城02期20座中層A	1	3	沙田第一城 02期 20座低層 A	$5,850,000	2015	Newman	
26	Sha Tin	City One - Shatin Block 8 5 Tak Kei Street	沙田第一城 01期 08座高層E	1	3	沙田第一城 01期 08座高層 E	$6,300,000	2015	Newman	
25	Sha Tin	City One - Shatin Block 7 7 Tak Kei Street	沙田第一城01期07座中層E	1	3	沙田第一城 01期 07座低層 E	$6,650,000	2015	Newman	Discrepancy; Demosisto press statement says address is 沙田第一城 01期 07座低層 E, but their map states the address as 沙田第一城01期07座中層E
24	Central and Western	Parkcrest 8 Ying Wa Terrace	鉑峯	48	89	鉑峯	$480,000,000	2015	Liaison Office	Purchase included the entire building and land
23	Eastern	Bayview Park 3 Hong Man Street	灣景園高層ABCDEH	1	2	灣景園高層 D	$4,137,000	2012	Newman	
23	Eastern	Bayview Park 3 Hong Man Street	灣景園高層ABCDEH	1	2	灣景園高層 H	$4,523,000	2012	Newman	
23	Eastern	Bayview Park 3 Hong Man Street	灣景園高層ABCDEH	1	2	灣景園高層 A	$4,317,000	2012	Newman	
23	Eastern	Bayview Park 3 Hong Man Street	灣景園高層ABCDEH	1	2	灣景園高層 C	$5,596,000	2012	Newman	
23	Eastern	Bayview Park 3 Hong Man Street	灣景園高層ABCDEH	1	2	灣景園高層 D	$4,197,000	2012	Newman	
23	Eastern	Bayview Park 3 Hong Man Street	灣景園高層ABCDEH	1	2	灣景園高層 E	$4,288,000	2012	Newman	
23	Eastern	Bayview Park 3 Hong Man Street	灣景園高層ABCDEH	1	2	灣景園高層 H	$4,560,000	2012	Newman	
23	Eastern	Bayview Park 3 Hong Man Street	灣景園高層ABCDEH	1	2	灣景園高層 E	$4,367,000	2012	Newman	
23	Eastern	Bayview Park 3 Hong Man Street	灣景園高層ABCDEH	1	2	灣景園高層 A	$4,235,000	2012	Newman	
23	Eastern	Bayview Park 3 Hong Man Street	灣景園高層ABCDEH	1	2	灣景園高層 E	$4,211,000	2012	Newman	
23	Eastern	Bayview Park 3 Hong Man Street	灣景園高層ABCDEH	1	2	灣景園高層 A	$4,272,000	2012	Newman	
23	Eastern	Bayview Park 3 Hong Man Street	灣景園高層ABCDEH	1	2	灣景園高層 B	$5,603,000	2012	Newman	
23	Eastern	Bayview Park 3 Hong Man Street	灣景園高層ABCDEH	1	2	灣景園高層 A	$4,426,000	2012	Newman	
23	Eastern	Bayview Park 3 Hong Man Street	灣景園高層ABCDEH	1	2	灣景園高層 D	$4,276,000	2012	Newman	
23	Eastern	Bayview Park 3 Hong Man Street	灣景園高層ABCDEH	1	2	灣景園高層 H	$4,653,000	2012	Newman	
22	Central and Western	Liang Ga Building 296-302 Des Voeux Road West	良基大廈低層A	1	2	良基大廈低層 A	$2,750,000	2010	Newman	
21	Wong Tai Sin	50-52 Sheung Fung Street	雙鳳街50－52號低層	2?	2?	雙鳳街50－52號低層	$3,680,000	2010	Newman	Discrepancy; Demosisto press statement says 1 unit and 1 room, but their maps states 2 units and 2 rooms
20	Southern	21 Tai Tam Road	大潭道21號	8	8	大潭道21號	$167,000,000	2007	Liaison Office	Purchase included the entire building and land
19	Yau Tsim Mong	Harbour Green Tower 3 8 Sham Mong Road	君匯港第03座低層至中層ABCDEFG	48	108	君滙港 (第03座) 深旺道8號 低層 ABCDEFGH 室	$160,000,000	2007	Newman	
18	Central and Western	Cheung Ling Mansion 162-164 Connaught Road West	昌寧大廈低層至中層01室、02室、03室、06室、04室、05室、07室	1	2	昌寧大廈低層02室	$3,900,000	2017	Newman	
18	Central and Western	Cheung Ling Mansion 162-164 Connaught Road West	昌寧大廈低層至中層01室、02室、03室、06室、04室、05室、07室	1	1	昌寧大廈低層03室	$4,020,000	2017	Newman	
18	Central and Western	Cheung Ling Mansion 162-164 Connaught Road West	昌寧大廈低層至中層01室、02室、03室、06室、04室、05室、07室	1	2	昌寧大廈高層04室	$4,450,000	2016	Newman	
18	Central and Western	Cheung Ling Mansion 162-164 Connaught Road West	昌寧大廈低層至中層01室、02室、03室、06室、04室、05室、07室	1	2	昌寧大廈高層05室	$4,500,000	2016	Newman	
18	Central and Western	Cheung Ling Mansion 162-164 Connaught Road West	昌寧大廈低層至中層01室、02室、03室、06室、04室、05室、07室	1	2	昌寧大廈低層01室	$4,400,000	2015	Newman	
18	Central and Western	Cheung Ling Mansion 162-164 Connaught Road West	昌寧大廈低層至中層01室、02室、03室、06室、04室、05室、07室	1	2	昌寧大廈低層07室	$4,500,000	2015	Newman	
18	Central and Western	Cheung Ling Mansion 162-164 Connaught Road West	昌寧大廈低層至中層01室、02室、03室、06室、04室、05室、07室	1	1	昌寧大廈低層07室	$980,000	2009	Newman	
18	Central and Western	Cheung Ling Mansion 162-164 Connaught Road West	昌寧大廈低層至中層01室、02室、03室、06室、04室、05室、07室	1	2	昌寧大廈中層02室	$1,600,000	2009	Newman	
18	Central and Western	Cheung Ling Mansion 162-164 Connaught Road West	昌寧大廈低層至中層01室、02室、03室、06室、04室、05室、07室	1	2	昌寧大廈低層06室	$1,300,000	2008	Newman	
18	Central and Western	Cheung Ling Mansion 162-164 Connaught Road West	昌寧大廈低層至中層01室、02室、03室、06室、04室、05室、07室	1	1	昌寧大廈低層01室	$1,250,000	2007	Newman	
18	Central and Western	Cheung Ling Mansion 162-164 Connaught Road West	昌寧大廈低層至中層01室、02室、03室、06室、04室、05室、07室	1	1	昌寧大廈低層02室	$1,200,000	2007	Newman	
18	Central and Western	Cheung Ling Mansion 162-164 Connaught Road West	昌寧大廈低層至中層01室、02室、03室、06室、04室、05室、07室	1	2	昌寧大廈低層06室	$1,350,000	2007	Newman	
18	Central and Western	Cheung Ling Mansion 162-164 Connaught Road West	昌寧大廈低層至中層01室、02室、03室、06室、04室、05室、07室	1	2	昌寧大廈低層03室	$1,380,000	2007	Newman	
18	Central and Western	Cheung Ling Mansion 162-164 Connaught Road West	昌寧大廈低層至中層01室、02室、03室、06室、04室、05室、07室	1	2	昌寧大廈低層04室	$1,400,000	2007	Newman	
17	Central and Western	King Court 18 Pokfield Road	西半山蒲飛路18至24號	52	132	西半山蒲飛路18至24號	$320,000,000	2003	Liaison Office	Registered in the NAR1 as the residence of Sun Zhongxin and Chen Zhibin
16	Wan Chai	Rich Court 11 Tsui Man Street	聚寶閣	50	196	跑馬地聚文街11號聚寶閣	$168,500,000	1995	Newman	
15	Central and Western	Louis Height 411 Queen's Road West	樂怡軒	48	48	皇后大道西411號樂怡軒	$106,000,000	2002	Liaison Office	Purchase included the entire building; land, 2 retail properties, and 48 residential units Registered in the NAR1 as the registered office of Newman and the residence of Chen Dunzhou
14	Wan Chai	16 Sing Woo Road	跑馬地成和道16號	69	106	跑馬地成和道16號	$40,754,552	1995	Newman	Purchase included the entire building; land, 3 retail properties, and 69 residential units
13	Wan Chai	Mint Garden 1-3 Cheong Ming Street	茗苑中層B	1	2	茗苑昌明街1 - 3號中層 B	$2,780,000	1995	Newman	
12	Wan Chai	Oi Kwan Court 28 Oi Kwan Road	愛群閣中層G	1	1	愛群閣 愛群道28號低層 G	$1,650,000	1994	Newman	
12	Wan Chai	Oi Kwan Court 28 Oi Kwan Road	愛群閣中層G	1	1	愛群閣 愛群道28號低層 G	$1,620,000	1994	Newman	
11	Wan Chai	Po Wing Building 6-16 Shell Street	寶榮大廈中層A、B、D	1	2	寶榮大廈 蜆殼街6－16號 中 層 D	$1	1994	Newman	
11	Wan Chai	Po Wing Building 6-16 Shell Street	寶榮大廈中層A、B、D	1	2	寶榮大廈 蜆殼街6－16號 中 層 A	$1	1994	Newman	
11	Wan Chai	Po Wing Building 6-16 Shell Street	寶榮大廈中層A、B、D	1	2	寶榮大廈 蜆殼街6－16號 中 層 B	$1	1994	Newman	
11	Wan Chai	Po Wing Building 6-16 Shell Street	寶榮大廈中層A、B、D	1	2	寶榮大廈 蜆殼街6－16號 中 層 D	$1	1994	Newman	
10	Wan Chai	Po Wing Building 26-28 Bowrington Road	寶榮大廈低層A	1	2	寶榮大廈 寶靈頓道26－28號 低層 A	$1,480,000	1994	Newman	
9	Wan Chai	Grand View Mansion 383-385A Queen's Road East	華景樓低層至中層A、B、D	1	2	皇后大道東383－385號華景 樓低層 A	$2,150,000	1999	Newman	
9	Wan Chai	Grand View Mansion 383-385A Queen's Road East	華景樓低層至中層A、B、D	1	2	皇后大道東383－385號華景 樓低層 B	$2,300,000	1999	Newman	
9	Wan Chai	Grand View Mansion 383-385A Queen's Road East	華景樓低層至中層A、B、D	1	2	皇后大道東383－385號華景 樓低層 D	$2,300,000	1998	Newman	
9	Wan Chai	Grand View Mansion 383-385A Queen's Road East	華景樓低層至中層A、B、D	1	2	皇后大道東383－385號華景 樓低層 A	$2,150,000	1995	Newman	
9	Wan Chai	Grand View Mansion 383-385A Queen's Road East	華景樓低層至中層A、B、D	1	1	皇后大道東383－385號華景 樓低層 B	$2,300,000	1995	Newman	
9	Wan Chai	Grand View Mansion 383-385A Queen's Road East	華景樓低層至中層A、B、D	1	2	皇后大道東383－385號華景 樓低層 B	$2,350,000	1994	Newman	
9	Wan Chai	Grand View Mansion 383-385A Queen's Road East	華景樓低層至中層A、B、D	1	2	皇后大道東383－385號華景 樓低層 B	$2,400,000	1993	Newman	
9	Wan Chai	Grand View Mansion 383-385A Queen's Road East	華景樓低層至中層A、B、D	1	2	皇后大道東383－385號華景 樓低層 A	$2,410,000	1993	Newman	
8	Wan Chai	Rosedale Glen 25-27 Sing Woo Rd	雅緻苑中層至高層F室	1	2	雅緻苑 成和道25－27號低層	$2,850,000	1993	Newman	
8	Wan Chai	Rosedale Glen 25-27 Sing Woo Rd	雅緻苑中層至高層F室	1	2	雅緻苑 成和道25－27號 中 層	$2,930,000	1993	Newman	
8	Wan Chai	Rosedale Glen 25-27 Sing Woo Rd	雅緻苑中層至高層F室	1	2	雅緻苑 成和道25－27號 高 層	$2,920,000	1993	Newman	
8	Wan Chai	Rosedale Glen 25-27 Sing Woo Rd	雅緻苑中層至高層F室	1	2	雅緻苑 成和道25－27號 中 層	$2,850,000	1993	Newman	
8	Wan Chai	Rosedale Glen 25-27 Sing Woo Rd	雅緻苑中層至高層F室	1	2	雅緻苑 成和道25－27號中層	$2,860,000	1993	Newman	
8	Wan Chai	Rosedale Glen 25-27 Sing Woo Rd	雅緻苑中層至高層F室	1	2	雅緻苑 成和道25－27號中層	$2,850,000	1993	Newman	
8	Wan Chai	Rosedale Glen 25-27 Sing Woo Rd	雅緻苑中層至高層F室	1	2	雅緻苑 成和道25－27號 中 層	$2,950,000	1993	Newman	
7	Eastern	10-16 Ching Wah Street	清華街10-16號	68	138?	清華街10－16號	$37,000,000	1987	Newman	Purchase included the entire building; land, 3 retail properties, and 68 residential units Discrepancy; Demosisto press statement says 18 rooms, but their maps states 138 rooms
6	Eastern	Kashi Court 36 Ming Yuen Western St	雅怡閣中層至高層AB室	26	52	雅怡閣低至中層 AB 室	$12,690,000	1986	Newman	
5	Wan Chai	1 Broadwood Road	樂活道1號	46	45	樂活道1號	$24,000,000	1986	Newman	Purchase included the entire building and land
4	Wan Chai	Tsui Man Court 76 Village Road	聚文樓中層E室	1	2	山村道70-76號聚文樓中層 E 室	$430,000	1985	Newman	
3	Wan Chai	8 Village Road	山村道8號	49	49	山村道8號	$5,200,000	1985	Newman	Purchase included the entire building and land
2	Wan Chai	Yee Hong Building 212-214 Wan Chai Road	怡康大廈中層A	1	3	怡康大廈中層 A	$3,003,900	1984	Newman	
1	Wan Chai	Xinhua Tower 5 Sharp St West	霎西街5號新華大廈中層至高層ABCD	48	72	霎西街5號新華大廈中層至 高層 ABCD 室	$40,000,000	1981	Newman	Entire building was purchased in 1981, and in 2009, the ground floor to 10th floor were transferred to Xinhua News HK. The 48 units (floors 11–22, units ABCD) are still owned by Newman.

=== Office Properties ===
The Liaison Office and Newman own 12 offices around Hong Kong; many are used by pro-Beijing organisations, such as the DAB.

Demosisto Report Appendix 2 - Office Properties
Demosisto Map ID	District	Address (English)	Address (Chinese)	Purchase Price (HKD)	Purchase Year	Use / Tenant	Owner	Quantity	Notes
10	Central and Western	Wai Wah Commercial Centre 6 Wilmer Street	西營盤威利麻 街6號威華商 業中心2303室	$12,817,000	2018	Unknown	Newman	1	Discrepancy; Demosisto press statement does not mention parking spaces being included in the purchase, but their map states 4 parking units were included in the purchase
9	Kwun Tong	Rykadan Capital Tower 135 Hoi Bun Road	觀塘宏基資本 大廈22樓全層	$135,000,000	2014	Kowloon branch of the Liaison Office	Liaison Office	1	Purchase included the 22nd floor office space and the 4 parking spots
8	Southern	Onshine Commercial Building 10 Tung Sing Road	朗盈商業大廈 22樓	$3,300,000	2010	Southern office of the DAB from 2012 to 2019	Newman	1	
7	Wan Chai	Great Smart Tower 230-230A Wan Chai Road	佳誠大廈11樓	$4,800,000	2004	The Federation of Alumni Associations of Chinese Colleges and Universities in Hong Kong	Newman	1	
6	Sha Tin	Citimark 28 Yuen Shun Circuit	都會廣場源順 圍 G B3	$11,662,200	2006	New Territories branch of the Liaison Office	Liaison Office	1	Purchase included the office and parking spot 115
6	Sha Tin	Citimark 28 Yuen Shun Circuit	都會廣場源順 圍 G R1-R2	$14,180,000	2003	New Territories branch of the Liaison Office	Liaison Office	2	
5	Central and Western	The Westpoint 160 Connaught Road West	西港中心中聯 辦大樓	$1,130,000,000	2001	Liaison Office headquarters (The Westpoint)	Liaison Office	1	Purchase included the entire building; land and parking spaces as well
4	Tai Po	Tai Po Commercial Centre 152-172 Kwong Fuk Road	大埔商業中心 9D	$5,597,000	1996	New Territories Association of Societies	Newman	1	
3	Wan Chai	Sup Tower 75-83 King's Road	聯合出版大廈 1404	$6,924,000	1993	Beijing - Hong Kong Academic Exchange Centre	Newman	1	
2	Central and Western	Shun Tak Centre 168-200 Connaught Road Central	香港干諾道中 200號信德中 心西座3209室	$40,584,000	1991	Liaison Office's Hong Kong Island branch	Newman	1	Purchase included the offices 3201, 3209, 3210, 3211, 3212, and parking spots 609 and 610
1	Eastern	Java Commercial Centre 128 Java Road	渣華商業中心 23樓	$2,425,000	1985	Hong Kong United Arts Entertainment Company and East Harbour Navigation Company	Newman	2?	Discrepancy; Demosisto press statement says 1 unit, but their map states 2 units

=== Retail Properties ===
The Liaison Office and Newman also own 8 retail properties in Hong Kong.

Demosisto Report Appendix 3 - Retail Properties
Demosisto Map ID	District	Address (English)	Address (Chinese)	Purchase Price (HKD)	Purchase Year	Use / Tenant	Owner	# of Properties	Notes
3	Central and Western	Louis Height 411 Queen's Road West	皇后大道西411 號樂怡軒	$106,000,000	2002	Unknown	Liaison Office	2	Purchase included the entire building; land, 2 retail properties, and 48 residential units
2	Wan Chai	16 Sing Woo Road	跑馬地成和道地 舖	$40,754,552	1995	Leased to Happy Valley Post Office ($140,000 HKD / month) and Justgreen Limited ($60,000 HKD / month)	Newman	3	Purchase included the entire building; land, 3 retail properties, and 69 residential units
1	Eastern	10-16 Ching Wah Street	清華街地舖	$37,000,000	1987	Unknown	Newman	3	Purchase included the entire building; land, 3 retail properties, and 68 residential units

=== Vehicle Parking Spaces ===
The Liaison Office and Newman own 15 parking spaces, 3 of which were purchased by Newman but whose exact address could not be found by Demosisto.

Demosisto Report Appendix 4 - Vehicle Parking Spaces
Demosisto Map ID	District	Address (English)	Address (Chinese)	Purchase Price	Owner	Purchase Year	# of Spaces	Notes
5	Central and Western	Elegant Garden 409 Queen's Road West	怡景花園 L2樓單號車位	$1,880,000	Newman	2017	1	
4	Central and Western	Kwan Yick Building Phase III 271-285 Des Voeux Road West	均益大廈 (第03期) B 樓雙號車 位	$1,450,000	Newman	2017	1	
4	Central and Western	Kwan Yick Building Phase III 271-285 Des Voeux Road West	均益大廈 (第03期) B 樓單號車 位	$1,680,000	Newman	2017	1	
3	Kwun Tong	Rykadan Capital Tower 135 Hoi Bun Road	觀塘宏基資本大廈01樓單雙號 車位	$135,000,000	Liaison Office	2014	4	Purchase included the 22nd floor office space and the 4 parking spots
2	Southern	21 Tai Tam Road	大潭道21號	$167,000,000	Liaison Office	2007	21?	Discrepancy; Demosisto press statement does not mention parking spaces here, but their map states 21 parking units were included in the purchase of the entire building
1	Sha Tin	Citimark 28 Yuen Shun Circuit	都會廣場 源順圍01樓單號車位	$11,662,000	Liaison Office	2006	1	Purchase included the office and parking spot 115
1	Sha Tin	Citimark 28 Yuen Shun Circuit	都會廣場源順圍01樓單雙號車 位	$720,000	Liaison Office	2003	4	Parking spots 101, 102, 103, and 104
