= Zheng Yanxiong =

Chinese politician (born 1963)

- 郑雁雄
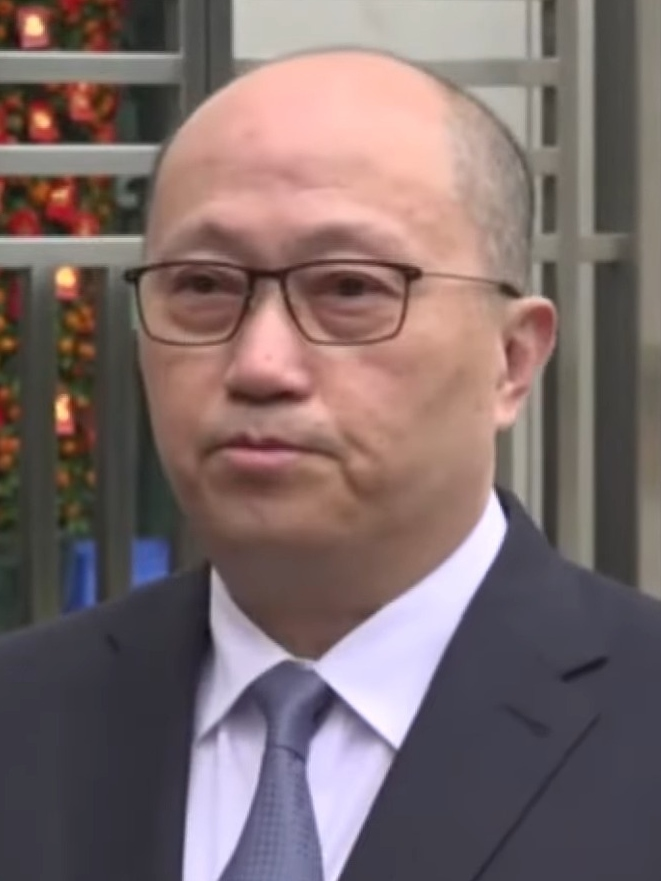
- Zheng in 2023

Director of the Liaison Office of the Central People's Government in Hong Kong
- In office 14 January 2023 – 30 May 2025
- Premier: Li Keqiang; Li Qiang
- Preceded by: Luo Huining
- Succeeded by: Zhou Ji

Director of the Office for Safeguarding National Security
- In office 3 July 2020 – 14 January 2023
- Deputy: Li Jiangzhou; Sun Qingye
- Preceded by: New office
- Succeeded by: Dong Jingwei

Secretary-General of the Guangdong Provincial Committee of the Chinese Communist Party
- In office October 2018 – July 2020
- Preceded by: Jiang Ling
- Succeeded by: Zhang Fuhai

Communist Party Secretary of Shanwei
- In office August 2011 – July 2013
- Preceded by: Rong Tiewen
- Succeeded by: Wen Guohui

Mayor of Shanwei
- In office 11 January 2009 – August 2011
- Preceded by: Wang Menghui
- Succeeded by: Wu Zili

Personal details
- Born: 25 August 1963 (age 63) Chaonan District, Shantou, Guangdong, China
- Party: Chinese Communist Party
- Education: Guangzhou University of Chinese Medicine; Sun Yat-sen University

Chinese name
- Simplified Chinese: 郑雁雄
- Traditional Chinese: 鄭雁雄
Transcriptions
Standard Mandarin
- Hanyu Pinyin: Zhèng Yànxióng
Yue: Cantonese
- Jyutping: Zeng6 Ngaan6-hung4

Zheng Yanxiong (Chinese: 郑雁雄; pinyin: Zhèng Yànxióng; born 25 August 1963) is a Chinese politician who served as director of the Hong Kong Liaison Office and secretary of the Hong Kong Work Committee of the Chinese Communist Party from January 2023 to May 2025. Previously, he was the director of the Office for Safeguarding National Security of the CPG in the HKSAR. Zheng is known for controversial statements denouncing foreign media reporting on the Wukan protests in Shanwei in 2011, and for the crackdown of renewed protests in Shanwei in 2016.

== Early life and education ==
Zheng was born in the Chaonan District of Shantou, Guangdong, in August 1963. In July 1984, he graduated from Guangzhou University of Chinese Medicine, where he obtained a bachelor's degree in traditional Chinese medicine. After graduation, he worked at the university. In May 1986, he joined the Chinese Communist Party (CCP). Zheng Yanxiong speaks Cantonese.

== Career ==
=== Guangzhou ===
In September 1992, he was appointed head of the Youth Work Department of Guangdong Provincial Committee of the Communist Youth League of China. One year later, he became a member of the Standing Committee of the CCP Guangdong Provincial Committee and was appointed head of the Urban Rural Department of Guangdong Provincial Committee of the Communist Youth League of China. In 1995, he earned a master of economics degree from Sun Yat-sen University. He became deputy secretary-general of South China Branch of People's Daily in March 1998, and then secretary-general, beginning in December of the same year. In January 2002, he was appointed deputy director of the Policy Research Office of Guangdong Provincial CCP Committee.

=== Shanwei ===
In January 2005, he was transferred to Shanwei and appointed Deputy Communist Party Secretary and Secretary of Discipline Inspection Commission. On 11 January 2009, he was promoted to become mayor of Shanwei, and then Communist Party Secretary, beginning in August 2011. During his term in office, he dealt with the Wukan protests. He became well known as party secretary in Shanwei when a protest by villagers in Wukan seeking compensation for land requisitioned by the government broke out in 2011.

=== Guangzhou ===
In July 2013, he was transferred back to Guangzhou and appointed executive vice director of Publicity Department of Guangdong Provincial Committee of the CCP. In May 2018, he became executive deputy secretary-general and director of the Policy Office of the Guangdong Provincial Committee of the CCP. In October of that same year, he was promoted to become secretary-general of the committee. On 29 January 2019, he was elected a member of the Standing Committee of the committee.

=== Hong Kong ===
On 3 July 2020, he was appointed as the director of the newly established Office for Safeguarding National Security of the CPG in the HKSAR.

In August 2020, Zheng and ten other officials were sanctioned by the United States Department of the Treasury under Executive Order 13936 by President Trump for undermining Hong Kong's autonomy. On 14 October 2020, the United States Department of State released a report on ten individuals who materially contributed to the failure of China to meet its obligations under the Sino–British Joint Declaration and Hong Kong's Basic Law. Zheng was on the list.

On 14 January 2023, he was appointed as the director of the Liaison Office of the Central People's Government in Hong Kong. He was also appointed as the national security advisor to the Committee for Safeguarding National Security, and was replaced by Zhou Ji on 31 May 2025.

Party political offices
Preceded by Luo Huining	Secretary of the Hong Kong Work Committee of the Chinese Communist Party; 2023–2025	Succeeded by Zhou Ji
Preceded by Rong Tiewen (戎铁文)	Communist Party Secretary of Shanwei; 2011–2013	Succeeded by Wen Guohui (温国辉)
Preceded by Jiang Ling (江陵)	Secretary-general of Guangdong Provincial Committee of the Chinese Communist Party; 2018–2020	Succeeded by Zhang Fuhai
Government offices
Preceded by Wang Menghui	Mayor of Shanwei; 2009–2011	Succeeded by Wu Zili (吴紫骊)
New title	Director the Office for Safeguarding National Security of the CPG in the HKSAR; 2020–2023	Succeeded by TBA
Preceded by Luo Huining	Director of the Liaison Office of the Central People's Government in Hong Kong; 2023–2025	Succeeded by Zhou Ji
