= Sun Qingye =

Chinese politician

- 孙青野

Deputy director of the Office for Safeguarding National Security of the CPG in the HKSAR
- Incumbent
- Assumed office 3 July 2020 Serving with Li Jiangzhou
- Leader: Zheng Yanxiong; Dong Jingwei
- Preceded by: Office established

Personal details
- Born: 1965 (age 60–61) Shijiazhuang, Hebei, China
- Party: Chinese Communist Party

Sun Qingye
- Traditional Chinese: 孫青野
- Simplified Chinese: 孙青野
Transcriptions
Standard Mandarin
- Hanyu Pinyin: Sūn Qīngyě

Sun Qingye, also known as Sun Wenqing (born 1965), is the deputy head of the Office for Safeguarding National Security of the CPG in the HKSAR. Sun has a background working in the Ministry of State Security of the People's Republic of China, particularly in the China International Culture Exchange Center.

On 15 January 2021, pursuant to Executive Order 13936, the United States Department of the Treasury imposed sanctions on six government officials, including Sun, in response to the arrest of more than 50 pro-democracy politicians and activists in Hong Kong.

After Sun was sanctioned, Apple Daily reported that Sun had been using an alias when he was sent to Hong Kong, and originally went by Sun Wenqing while working in other positions in the government.
