= Dong Jingwei =

Chinese politician and spymaster

- 董经纬

Director of the Office for Safeguarding National Security
- Incumbent
- Assumed office 18 July 2023
- Deputy: Li Jiangzhou; Sun Qingye
- Preceded by: Zheng Yanxiong

Vice Minister of State Security
- In office April 2018 – July 2023 Serving with Tang Chao
- Minister: Chen Wenqing; Chen Yixin
- Premier: Li Keqiang; Li Qiang

Director of the Political Department of the Ministry of State Security
- In office April 2017 – April 2018
- Minister: Chen Wenqing
- Premier: Li Keqiang

Personal details
- Born: November 18, 1963 (age 62) Zhao County, Hebei, China
- Party: Chinese Communist Party
- Children: 1
- Occupation: Spymaster, politician
- Central institution membership: 18th, 19th National Congress; 13th People's Political Consultative Conference

Dong Jingwei (Chinese: 董经纬; pinyin: Dǒng Jīngwěi; born 18 November 1963) is a Chinese politician and intelligence officer who served as a Vice Minister of the Chinese Ministry of State Security (MSS) from 2018 to 2023 and currently the head of the Office for Safeguarding National Security in Hong Kong since 2023. Prior to that he served as the MSS head of counterintelligence.

== Early life and career ==
=== Intelligence career ===
Dong's career in national security began with more than a decade of service as director of the Hebei provincial State Security Department (SSD), a regional unit of the Ministry of State Security. He led the department from February 2006 to March 30, 2017. During that time he was active in communist party politics, and involved in several regional committees and conferences. In 2007, he was appointed to the 7th Hebei Provincial Committee of the Chinese Communist Party (CCP). In 2010, reports surfaced from Paris-based Intelligence Online that Dong had carried out orders from superiors in Beijing to arrest four Japanese employees of the Fujita Corporation who "were filming in a forbidden military zone", a move the publication described as a power play by senior officials within the MSS against then-President and General Secretary Hu Jintao. His loyalty to superiors, age and regional background won him favor with senior party officials under Hu's successor, Xi Jinping, with Dong soon becoming a part of the Xi Jinping faction, the dominant political faction in the communist party. By 2018, Intelligence Online reported that Dong was close to Xi, observing that “he previously headed the Guo'anbu in the region of Hebei, a province which has produced many of Xi's securocrats."

On April 1, 2017, Dong was promoted from regional intelligence operations to a national posting in Beijing, appointed director of the Political Department of the MSS (Bureau No. 3). He was promoted quickly within the agency, and almost exactly a year later in late April 2018, he was appointed to his current position, Vice Minister of State Security. With higher office, his political stature continued to grow, serving as a representative at the communist party's 18th and 19th National Congress, and serving as a member of the 13th National Committee of the Chinese People's Political Consultative Conference. In March 2019, he was named a vice president of the Eighth Council of the Chinese Law Society.

== Defection rumors ==
In June 2021, rumors began to surface first in Chinese social media, and soon in international news media suggesting Dong had defected in mid-February, flying from Hong Kong to the United States with his adult daughter, Dong Yang. The rumors claimed Dong had provided key information about the Wuhan Institute of Virology and China's biological weapons program that changed the stance of the Biden administration concerning the origins of the COVID-19 pandemic. Citing an unnamed source, Han Lianchao, defected former Chinese foreign ministry official, alleged that China's foreign minister Wang Yi and Communist Party Politburo member Yang Jiechi had demanded Dong's return. In the report by Spytalk on June 17, former U.S. intelligence officer Nicholas Eftimiades described the rumor as "exactly what it is, a rumor. It happens all the time", but called Han "a straight shooter, not known to exaggerate in any way or form… trusted for his integrity."

Within 24 hours of SpyTalk's June 17 exposé, Chinese state media reported that Dong has made an appearance at an MSS seminar, urging China's intelligence officers to "step up their efforts to hunt down foreign agents and insiders who collude with 'anti-China' forces. A South China Morning Post report about Dong's comments mentioned a "22-year-old journalism student, identified only by his surname Tian, [who has] been accused of providing information to an unnamed Western country to smear China." Tian was tried behind closed doors in 2020. However, the original state media report included neither the location of the seminar, nor any audiovisual record of Dong's presence; further heightening suspicions of Dong's true status.

Following scattered reports and rumors of his whereabouts, on June 22 an unnamed senior official within the Biden administration gave Spytalk what it called a "definitive" denial. Eftimiades told SpyTalk the unattributed denial from a senior U.S. official was "stunning", and "likely coordinated at the highest levels", calling the saga a closed issue: "game, set, match." The meeting was noted by the Chinese Embassy in Washington, though some Chinese netizens have questioned the veracity of the footage. No on the record comments have been released on the matter by either government.

In its assessment of the saga on June 26, China-focused political risk consultancy SinoInsider concluded "it is very possible that the bulk of defector rumors are classic CCP disinformation operations designed to muddy the waters on the topic and ruin the credibility of the international media, Chinese dissidents, and world governments".

== Hong Kong national security chief ==
On 18 July 2023, Hong Kong Chief Executive John Lee Ka-chiu welcomed Dong's appointment to lead the Office for Safeguarding National Security, which oversees national security in Hong Kong.

On 31 March 2025, Dong was among six officials in Hong Kong and Mainland China sanctioned by the United States for their role in persecuting exiled pro-democracy activists.

On 17 July 2026, the United States Treasury deleted the sanctions on nine of the (former) officials in Mainland China and Hong Kong including Dong Jingwei, following the ending of state of emergency regarding Hong Kong.

== Personal life ==
Dong is a native of Zhao County, Hebei province. Educated in China, his postgraduate studies include a Masters of Science. He has a daughter, Dong Yang.

== See also ==
- National Security Commission of the Chinese Communist Party
- Ministry of Public Security (China)
- Chinese intelligence activity abroad

Government offices
| Unknown | Vice Minister of State Security; April 2018–Present; Served alongside: Tang Chao | Incumbent |
| Unknown | Director of the Ministry of State Security Political Department; April 2017–April 2018 | Unknown |
| Preceded by Zhang Guobin | Director of the Department of National Security of Hebei Province; 2013–March 2017 | Succeeded by Liu Zengqi |
