= Chun Wo Development Holdings =

Hong Kong–based property development and engineering company

- Company type: Private company
- Industry: Property; Construction
- Founded: 1968
- Headquarters: Hong Kong
- Area served: Asia-Pacific
- Services: Architectural engineering; Construction management; Real estate development
- Subsidiaries: Chun Wo Construction Holdings Company Limited
- Website: Official website

Chun Wo Development Holdings Limited (Chinese: 俊和發展集團有限公司) is a Hong Kong-based Asia-Pacific property development and engineering company. The company is a subsidiary of Asia Allied Infrastructure Holdings Limited, a public company listed on the Hong Kong Stock Exchange.

Chun Wo Development was established by Kam-Chun Pang in 1968. The Group started off as a constructor of private sector construction, and later became involved in constructing buildings of various types and functions for the Hong Kong government as well as for private developers.

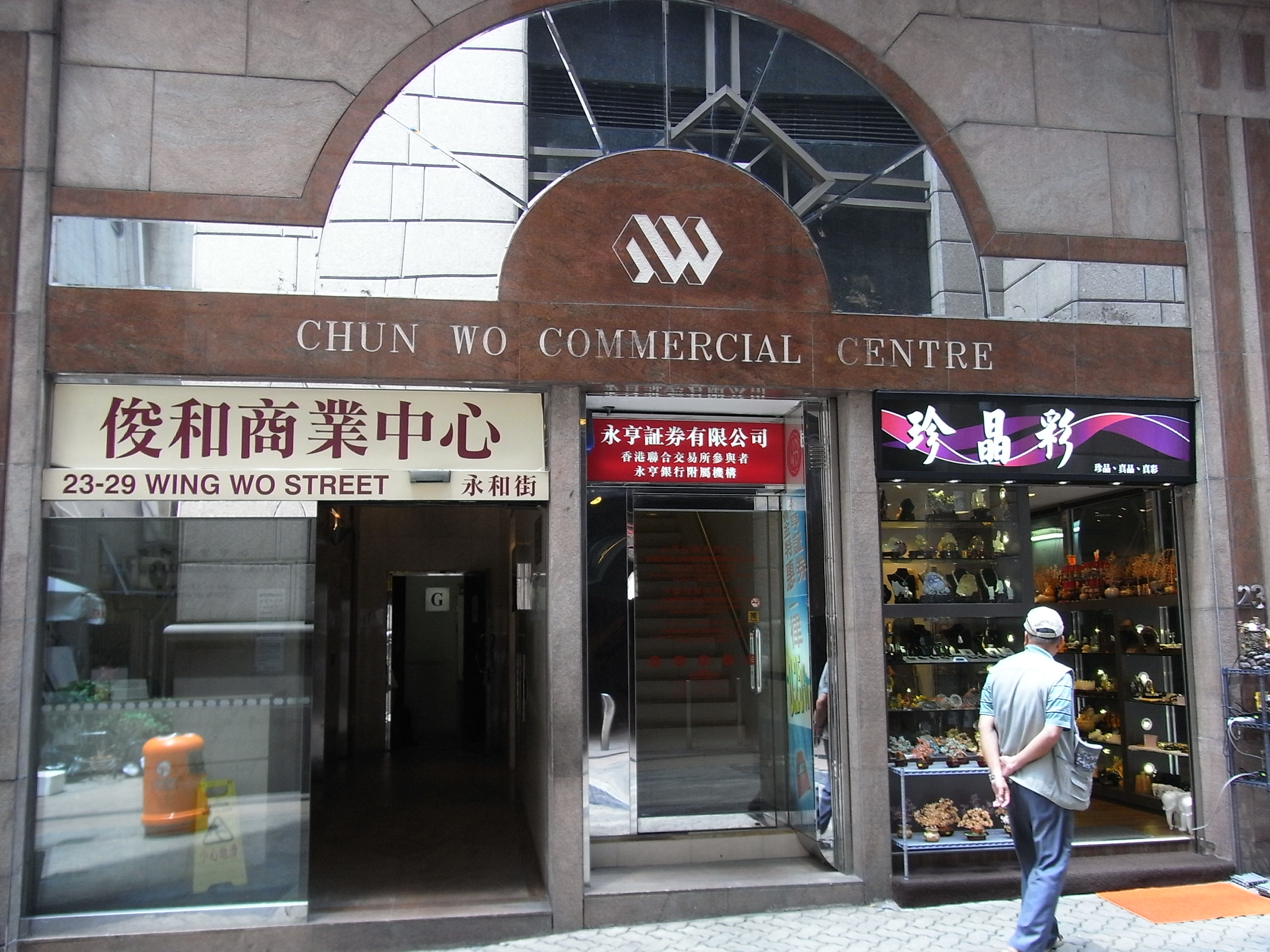
Chun Wo Commercial Centre at Sheung Wan, Hong Kong.

== Major projects ==
=== Real estate development ===
- Grandeur Terrace, Tin Shui Wai, Hong Kong (2003, jointly developed with Hong Kong Housing Authority)
- Saigon Pearl, Ho Chi Minh City, Vietnam (2009)
- Reem Diamond Residence, Abu Dhabi, United Arab Emirates (2014)
- 128 Waterloo, Kowloon, Hong Kong (2022)

=== Construction project ===
- The Westpoint, Sai Ying Pun, Hong Kong (1999)
- The Greenhill Villa, Sha Tin, Hong Kong (2018)
- MTR Kai Tak station, Kai Tak, Hong Kong (2020, a joint venture with Kaden Construction Limited)
- Government Flying Service Kai Tak Division, Kai Tak, Hong Kong (2021)
