= Office for Safeguarding National Security =

Government office in Hong Kong

- 中華人民共和國 中央人民政府駐香港特別行政區 維護國家安全公署
- National emblem of China

Agency overview
- Formed: 1 July 2020
- Type: Deputy-ministerial level agency
- Jurisdiction: Central People's Government (State Council)
- Headquarters: Metropark Hotel, 148 Tung Lo Wan Road, Causeway Bay, Hong Kong (Temporary); Island Pacific Hotel, 152 Connaught Road West, Sai Ying Pun, Hong Kong (Temporary); 15 Hoi Fan Road, Tai Kok Tsui, Kowloon, Hong Kong (Permanent, Planning)
- Agency executives: Dong Jingwei, Director; Li Jiangzhou, Deputy; Sun Qingye, Deputy
- Parent organization: State Council of China; Central Committee of the Chinese Communist Party
- Website: osns.gov.cn

Office for Safeguarding National Security

Office for Safeguarding National Security of the Central People's Government of the People's Republic of China in the Hong Kong Special Administrative Region
- Traditional Chinese: 中華人民共和國中央人民政府駐香港特別行政區維護國家安全公署
- Simplified Chinese: 中华人民共和国中央人民政府驻香港特别行政区维护国家安全公署
Transcriptions
Standard Mandarin
- Hanyu Pinyin: Zhōngyāng rénmín zhèngfǔ zhù Xiānggǎng tèbié xíngzhèngqū wéihù guójiā ānquán gōngshǔ
Yue: Cantonese
- Jyutping: zung1joeng1 jan4man4 zing3fu2 zyu3 hoeng1gong2 dak6bit6 hang4zing3keoi1 wai4wu6 gwok3gaa1 on1cyun4 gung1cyu5

Office for Safeguarding National Security
- Traditional Chinese: 維護國家安全公署
- Simplified Chinese: 维护国家安全公署
Transcriptions
Standard Mandarin
- Hanyu Pinyin: Wéihù guójiā ānquán gōngshǔ
Yue: Cantonese
- Jyutping: wai4wu6 gwok3gaa1 on1cyun4 gung1cyu5

The Office for Safeguarding National Security of the Central People's Government of the People's Republic of China in the Hong Kong Special Administrative Region (OSNS) is the Chinese central government's national security office in Hong Kong.

The OSNS was established in July 2020 by the Hong Kong national security law. The office is headed by director Dong Jingwei and is entirely staffed by mainland officials. The office is a part of, and funded by, the Central People's Government (State Council) of China and is not subject to Hong Kong jurisdiction. It is officially under the list of agencies that are dispatched by the Central Committee of the Chinese Communist Party.

== History ==
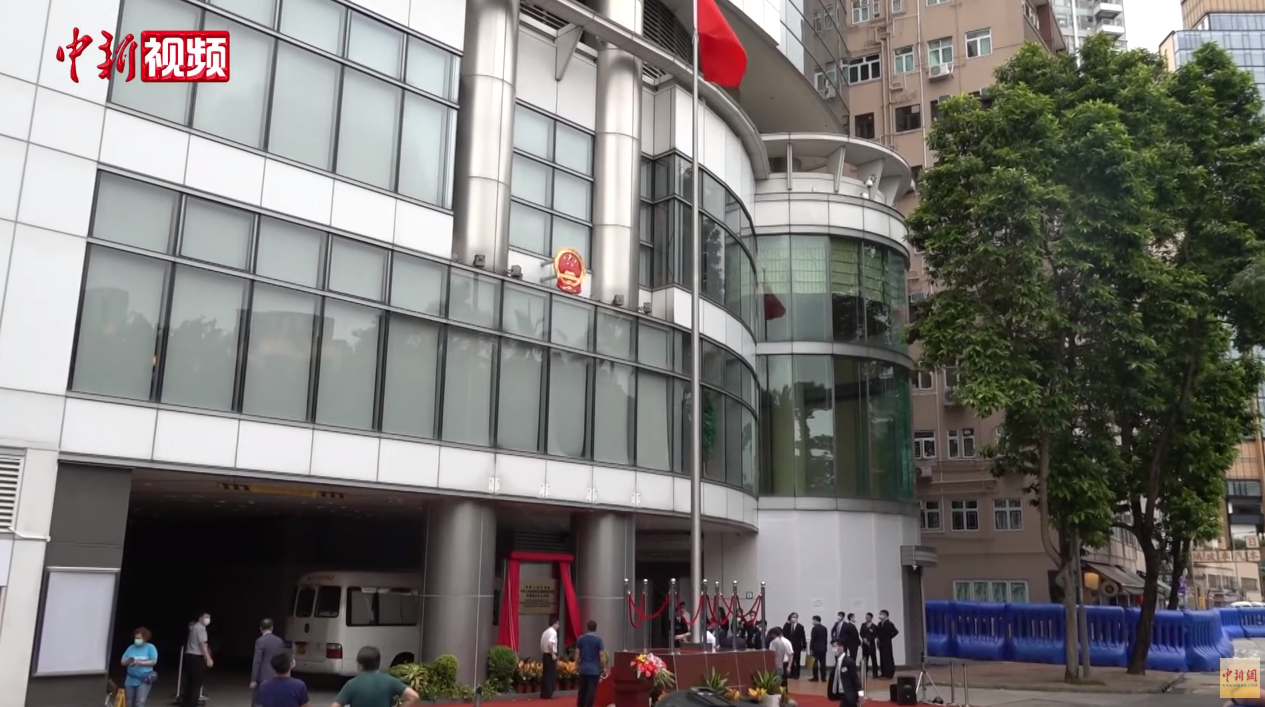
Inauguration of the OSNS headquarters

The OSNS was established on 1 July 2020, as a result of the promulgation of the Hong Kong national security law. The law was, in contrast with the regular legislative process of the region, not passed by the local Legislative Council, but by the Standing Committee of the National People's Congress in Beijing. On 3 July 2020, the State Council appointed Zheng Yanxiong as director of the organisation, and Li Jiangzhou and Sun Qingye as deputy heads.

The first Office director, Zheng Yanxiong, was sanctioned by the United States Treasury in August 2020 pursuant to the Normalization Executive Order (Executive Order 13936). The order, which had been issued by US President Donald Trump on 14 July, had been a response to the imposition of the national security law. Deputy director Li Jiangzhou was sanctioned by the US on 9 November. Deputy director Sun Qingye was sanctioned by the US on 15 January 2021.

Following the arrest of 53 pro-democracy figures in January 2021, the Office expressed support for the operation and singled out Benny Tai.

In February 2021, Zheng Zehui and Deng Jianwei were added to the office as bureau chiefs. In July 2023, Dong Jingwei was appointed to head the OSNS.

In December 2025, the OSNS warned foreign journalists reporting on the Wang Fuk Court fire to avoid negative coverage of the Hong Kong government's response to the fire.

=== Headquarters ===
On 7 July 2020, the location of the OSNS temporary headquarters was announced. The Office, together with its employees' living quarters, is located in the Metropark Hotel Causeway Bay building. The hotel replaced by the OSNS was owned by China Travel Service (a tourism agency previously accused of assisting Chinese authorities in doxing local pro-democracy journalists and activists). After the office opened on 8 July 2020 amid tight security, the building's floor plans were removed from publicly accessible records.

On 19 April 2021, the Office announced that it was taking over the Island Pacific Hotel in Sai Ying Pun as an additional work site. On 23 April 2021, it was announced that a new building for the office's use will be constructed at Tai Kok Tsui at a cost of HKD$8 million. The future site is around 11,500 square metres (124,000 sq ft) and is classified within areas zoned "Government, Institution or Community" on the South West Kowloon Outline Zoning Plan.

In November 2022, the OSNS bought a 7,171 sqft 5-bedroom mansion in Beacon Hill for HK$508 million. In addition, it uses the City Garden Hotel for residences. Another hotel, the CTS (China Travel Service) (HK) Hotel Development in Hung Hom is also used by the office, also named the Metropark Hotel Hung Hom.

== Functions ==
The OSNS is a part of, and funded by, the Central People's Government (State Council) of China and is not subject to Hong Kong jurisdiction. It is officially under the list of agencies that are dispatched by the Central Committee of the Chinese Communist Party. It is entirely staffed by mainland officials.

For the office to be allowed to exercise its jurisdiction on a case, either the office itself or the Government of Hong Kong needs to request approval from the Central People's Government (CPG). Statutorily, the office is only to be granted jurisdiction in cases of complexity due to the presence of foreign or external elements, inability of the regional government to enforce the law, or a major and imminent threat to national security. However, the structuring of the approval process effectively means that the CPG can, since it also administers the OSNS, grant its organ jurisdiction at its own discretion, without legal interference from Hong Kong regional authorities. The Hong Kong Secretary for Justice has stated that a suspect's right to engage a lawyer registered to practice in Hong Kong, but not in mainland China, will be determined through the application of mainland law.

When the OSNS has been granted jurisdiction to investigate a case, the Supreme People's Procuratorate decides which body prosecutes the case, and the Supreme People's Court decides which court is to adjudicate it. In these cases, procedural matters are governed by PRC law, including the Chinese Criminal Procedure Law. This leads to a lack of judicial independence, the absence of the right to remain silent, the possibility of incommunicado detention, and significant restriction of the right to counsel.

=== Immunity ===
The office and its staff are not subject to Hong Kong jurisdiction. Furthermore, on-duty holders of identification or certification documents issued by the office are immune from inspection, search, and detention by Hong Kong law enforcement officers.

== See also ==
National security and Intelligence

- Committee for Safeguarding National Security
- National Security Department of the Hong Kong Police
- National Security Commission of the Chinese Communist Party
- Ministry of State Security (China)
- United Front Work Department

Chinese oversight of Hong Kong

- Hong Kong Liaison Office of the CPG
- Hong Kong Garrison of the PLA
- Office of the Commissioner of the Ministry of Foreign Affairs in Hong Kong
- Central Leading Group on Hong Kong and Macau Affairs
  - Hong Kong and Macau Affairs Office
- United front in Hong Kong
