= Office of the Commissioner of the Ministry of Foreign Affairs (Hong Kong) =

Government office in Hong Kong, China

Office of the Commissioner of the Ministry of Foreign Affairs of the People's Republic of China in the Hong Kong Special Administrative Region
- 中華人民共和國外交部 駐香港特別行政區特派員公署

Agency overview
- Formed: 1 July 1997
- Jurisdiction: Government of China
- Agency executive: Cui Jianchun, Commissioner
- Parent department: Ministry of Foreign Affairs
- Website: hk.ocmfa.gov.cn

The Office of the Commissioner of the Ministry of Foreign Affairs of the People's Republic of China in the Hong Kong Special Administrative Region, or OCMFA, is the government office of the Ministry of Foreign Affairs of China in Hong Kong SAR set up in accordance with the Basic Law to handle foreign affairs relating to the region. The main responsibilities of the Commissioner's Office are to coordinate Hong Kong's participation in international organizations and conferences, to deal with the application issues of international conventions in Hong Kong, to coordinate the establishment of consular offices by foreign governments in Hong Kong, and to undertake the visiting affairs of foreign state aircraft and warships to Hong Kong.

The current commissioner is Cui Jianchun. The premises of the office is located at 42, Kennedy Road, Mid-levels, at the intersection of Kennedy Road and Macdonnell Road. It also owns property nearby, including staff quarters and the official residence of the Commissioner. A similar office of the ministry was also established in Macau, another special administrative region of the People's Republic of China.

== In news ==
In 2019, a member of the office tried to block pro-independence Andy Chan from speaking at an event.

On 2 March 2021, Song Ruan, then the deputy commissioner of the office, was the guest of honor at a private dinner at a Wan Chai social club to celebrate his departure from the position, and attendees were later fined for breaking COVID-19 social gathering restrictions.

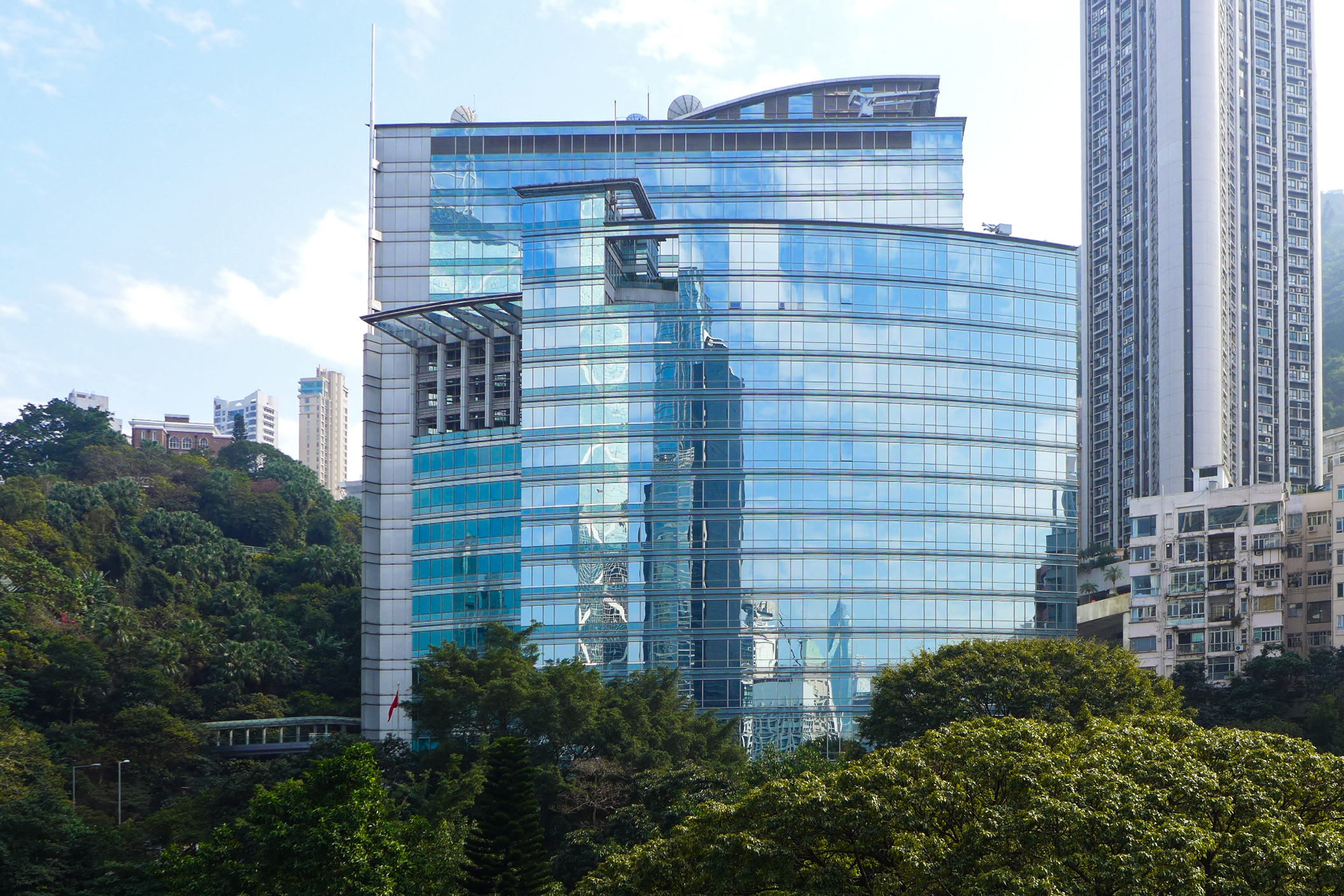
The Commissioner's Office of China's Foreign Ministry in the Hong Kong S.A.R.

In April 2021, a spokesman for the office commented on US ambassador Hanscom Smith's criticism of Hong Kong's arrest of Jimmy Lai, stating that "No external forces are allowed to comment on the Hong Kong court's lawful judgment on people such as Lai. The US envoy has damaged the rule of law by glorifying and justifying their acts."

Office of the Commissioner of the Ministry of Foreign Affairs
- Traditional Chinese: 中華人民共和國外交部駐香港特別行政區特派員公署
- Simplified Chinese: 中华人民共和国外交部驻香港特别行政区特派员公署
Transcriptions
Standard Mandarin
- Hanyu Pinyin: Zhōnghuá Rénmín Gònghéguó Wàijiāobù zhù Xiānggǎng Tèbiéxíngzhèngqū Tèpàiyuán Gōngshǔ
Yue: Cantonese
- Yale Romanization: Jūng wàh yàhn màhn guhng wòh gwok ngoih gāau bouh jyu Hēung góng dahk biht hàhng jing kēui dahk paai yùhn gūng chyúh
- Jyutping: Zung1 waa4 jan4 man4 gung6 wo4 gwok3 ngoi6 gaau1 bou6 zyu3 Hoeng1 gong2 dak6 bit6 hang4 zing3 keoi1 dak6 paai3 jyun4 gung1 cyu5

Also in April 2021, the deputy commissioner, Fang Jianming, said that the government was ready to strike back at calls from Chris Patten to sanction government officials "responsible for the crackdown on the pro-democracy movement in Hong Kong."

In September 2021, the Office published a list of more than 100 "crimes" that the United States committed against Hong Kong. It listed an instance where the US Consulate in Hong Kong had put electric candles in its windows on 4 June 2021, in remembrance of the 1989 Tiananmen Square protests and massacre, as an offense.

In September 2022, the Office criticized the Foreign Correspondents' Club, saying "The FCC and some Western politicians ignored the facts and took every opportunity to attack the SAR government and supported anti-China forces in Hong Kong, which fully exposed their intention of meddling with the rule of law in the SAR and disrupting Hong Kong in the name of press freedom. Their tricks will bite the dust."

In January 2023, the Office said that the UK should stop issuing its half-yearly reports on Hong Kong, saying the reports "grossly interfered with Hong Kong affairs and China's internal affairs, and seriously trampled on international law." One of the reports stated that "Freedoms are being systematically eroded by Beijing on multiple fronts, tightening the restrictions on the lives of ordinary Hongkongers."

Later in January 2023, after the United States extended visas for certain Hongkongers in the United States, the Office said that the US was providing a refuge for "anti-China forces who have left Hong Kong."

In 2022, it was reported that the Office asked consular missions in Hong Kong about their floor plans, lease details, and staff residences, and also asked to inspect new premises before staff enter them. In September 2023, the Office further asked consulates in Hong Kong to provide information on all locally employed staff, including copies of their ID cards.

== See also ==
- Ministry of Foreign Affairs of the People's Republic of China
  - Office of the Commissioner of the Ministry of Foreign Affairs of the People's Republic of China in the Macao Special Administrative Region
- Consular missions in Hong Kong
- Hong Kong Economic and Trade Office
- Liaison Office of the Central People's Government in the Hong Kong Special Administrative Region
