= Island Pacific Hotel =

Hotel in Sai Ying Pun, Hong Kong

- 港島太平洋酒店
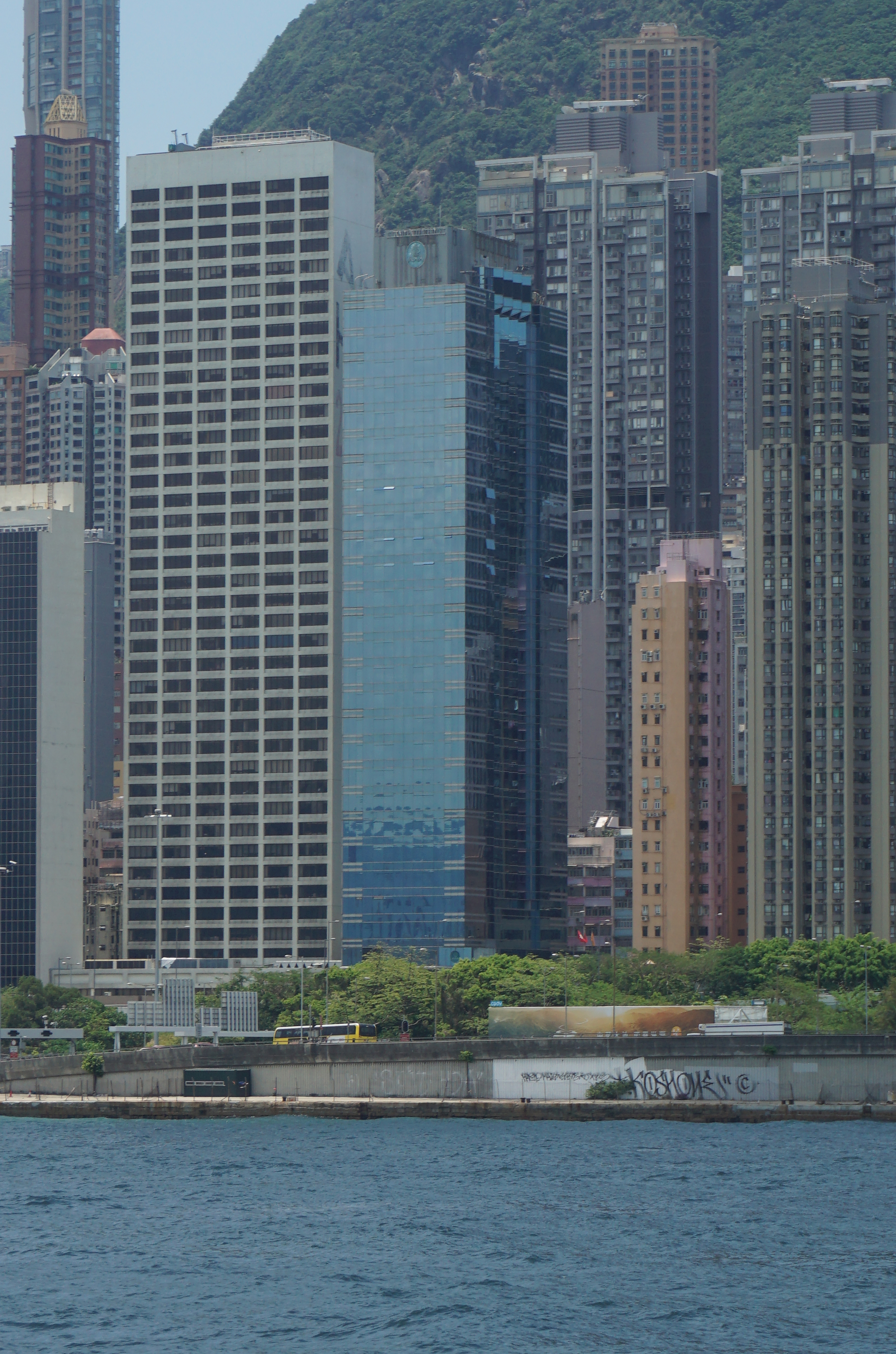
- Interactive map of the Island Pacific Hotel area

General information
- Status: Completed
- Location: 152 Connaught Road West, Sai Ying Pun, Sai Wan, Hong Kong Island, Hong Kong
- Current tenants: Office for Safeguarding National Security of the CPG in the HKSAR (from 10 April 2021)
- Opened: 1999; 27 years ago (Temporary closed from 10 April 2021)
- Owner: Sino Group
- Operator: Sino Hotels (Holdings) Limited

Height
- Top floor: 29

Other information
- Number of rooms: 343

Website
- www.islandpacifichotel.com.hk/cn/home.html

The Island Pacific Hotel is a 4-star hotel in Sai Ying Pun, Hong Kong.

By May 2021 the Office for Safeguarding National Security began using the hotel.

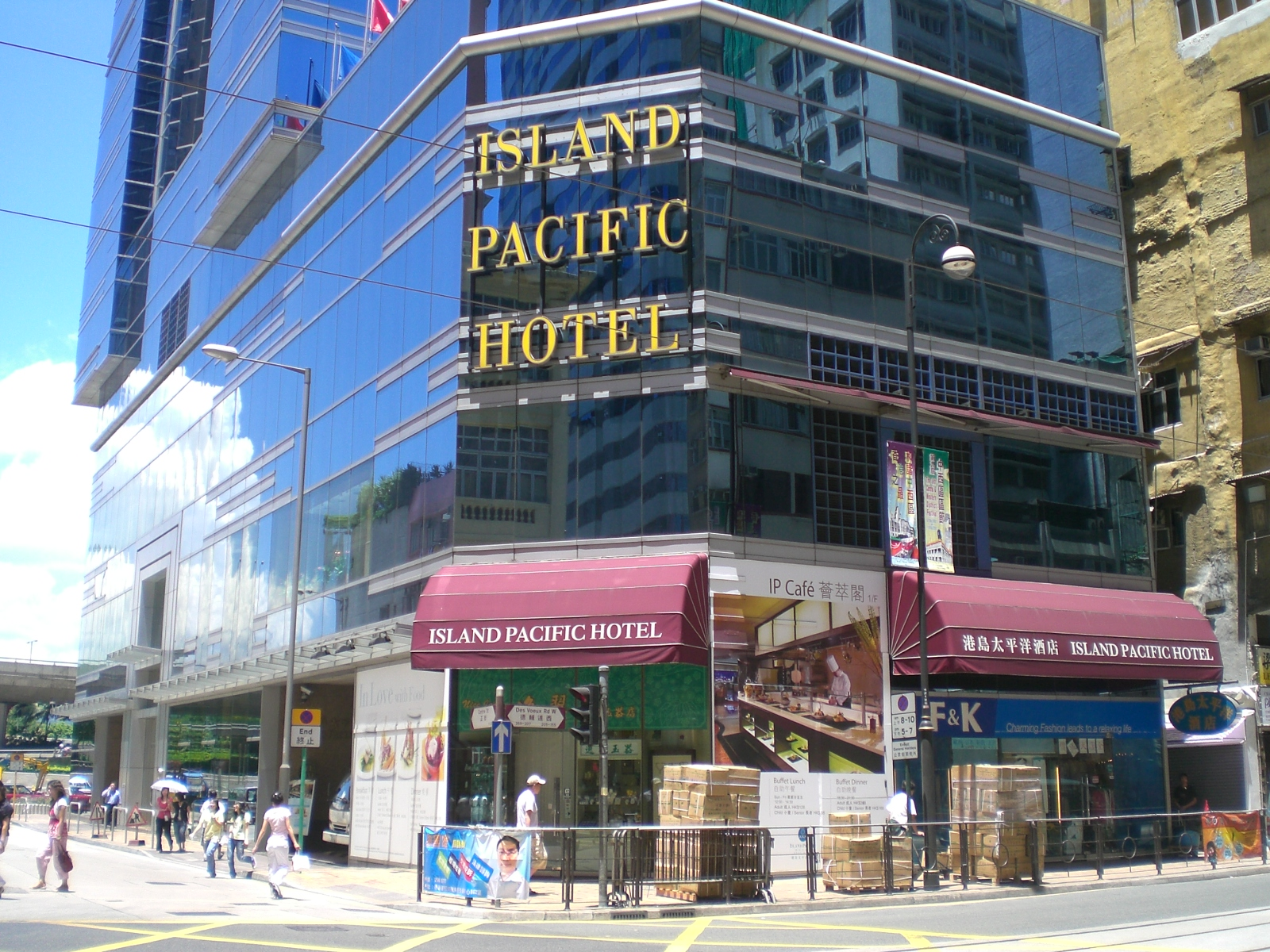
The hotel's exterior in 2007
