= Metropark Hotel Causeway Bay Hong Kong =

Hotel in Hong Kong

- Chinese: 香港銅鑼灣維景酒店
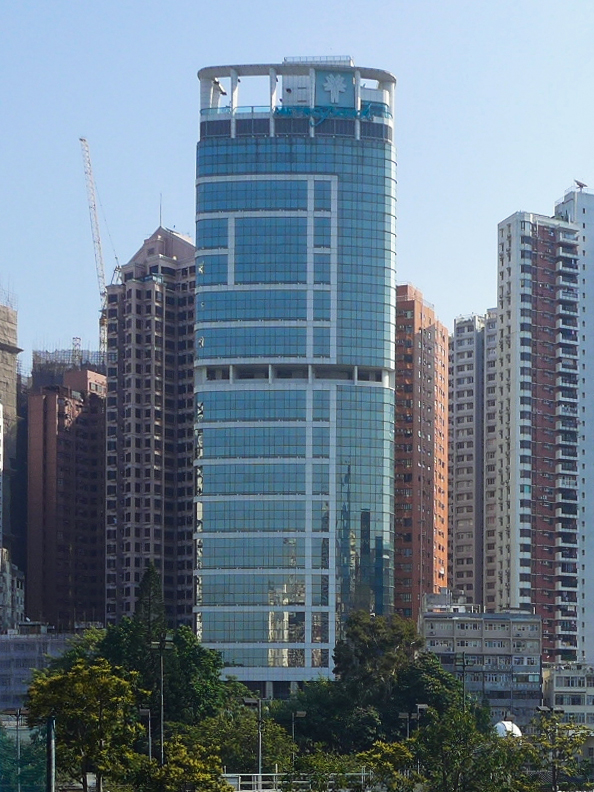
- Interactive map of the Metropark Hotel Causeway Bay Hong Kong area

General information
- Location: 148 Tung Lo Wan Road, Causeway Bay, Hong Kong
- Coordinates: 22.281294°N 114.192126°E
- Current tenants: Office for Safeguarding National Security of the CPG in the HKSAR (from 8 July 2020)
- Opened: 2002; 24 years ago (Temporarily closed from July 2020)

Technical details
- Floor count: 33

Other information
- Number of rooms: 266

Metropark Hotel Causeway Bay Hong Kong
- Traditional Chinese: 香港銅鑼灣維景酒店
- Simplified Chinese: 香港铜锣湾维景酒店
Transcriptions
Standard Mandarin
- Hanyu Pinyin: Xiānggǎng Tóngluó Wān Wéijǐng Jiǔdiàn
Yue: Cantonese
- Jyutping: hoeng1 gong2 tung4 lo4 waan1/*4 wai4 ging2 zau2 dim3

Metropark Hotel Causeway Bay Hong Kong (Chinese: 香港銅鑼灣維景酒店) was a four-star Hotel in Causeway Bay, Wan Chai District, Hong Kong. It was located on 148 Tung Lo Wan Road. The hotel was close to Tin Hau station with 33 floors and 266 rooms. The hotel opened in 2002 and was owned by China Travel Service.

On 8 July 2020, the Office for Safeguarding National Security was established in the hotel's building. It is unclear whether the office will be temporary or permanent, with the hotel stating they would not be taking bookings for the next six months.

== Facilities ==
The hotel had Wi-Fi, a gymnasium, restaurants, bars, and a rooftop pool with a view of Victoria Harbour. Furthermore, the hotel had a free shuttle service to Hong Kong Convention and Exhibition Centre and the shopping malls of Causeway Bay. A cross boundary coaches bus stop is next to the hotel, which provides coaches to the Guangdong Province of the Mainland of China.

=== Restaurants ===
- Vic's (Bar)
- Binfen Wei Yuan Restaurant
