= The Westpoint =

Building in Sai Ying Pun, Hong Kong

Coordinates: 22.2879°N 114.1398°E

- 西港中心
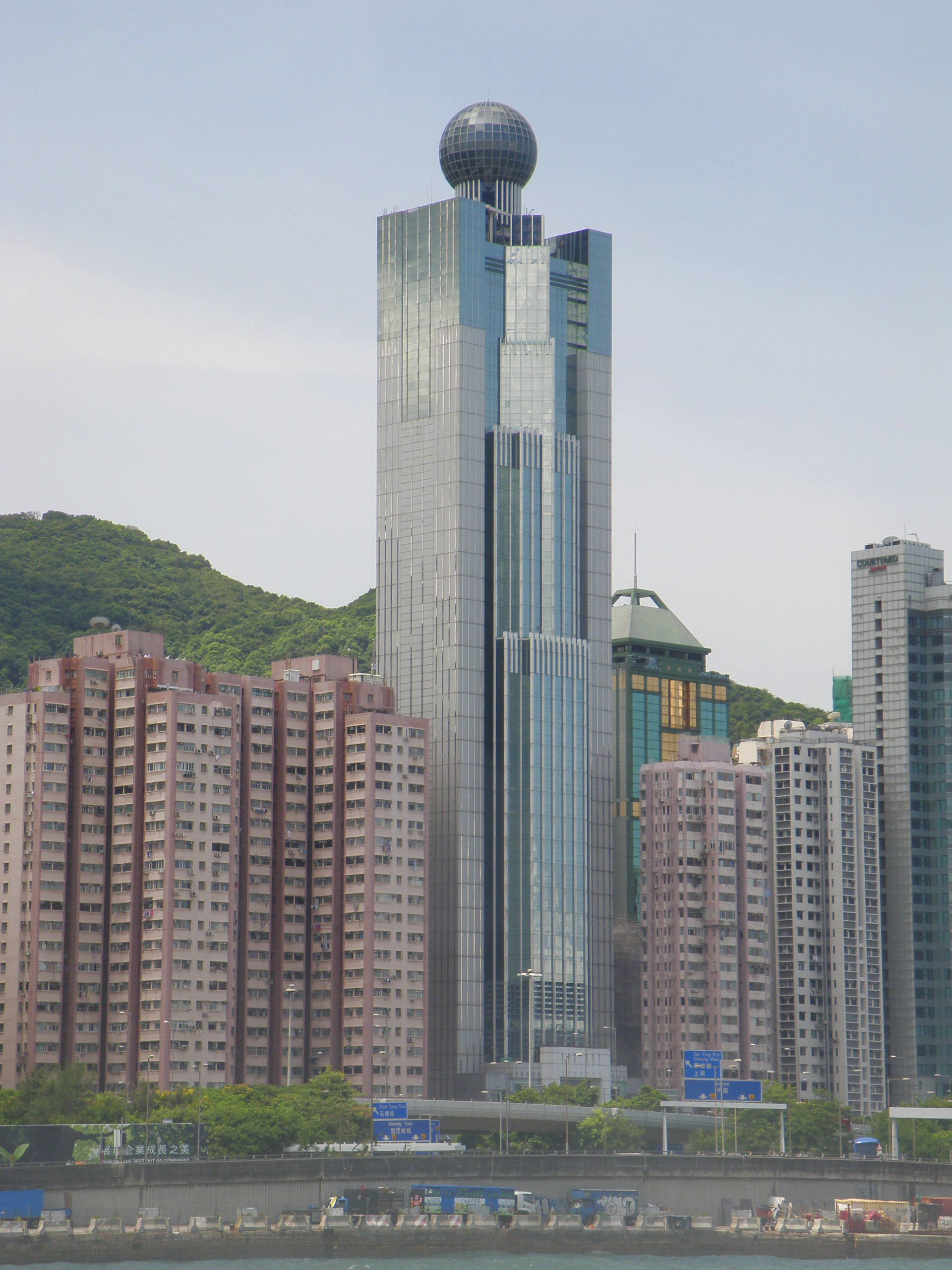
- Interactive map of the The Westpoint area

General information
- Type: Office
- Location: 160 Connaught Road West, Sai Ying Pun, Hong Kong Island, Hong Kong
- Completed: 1999; 27 years ago
- Opening: 1999; 27 years ago
- Owner: Liaison Office of the Central People's Government in the Hong Kong Special Administrative Region

Height
- Roof: 186 m (610 ft)

Technical details
- Floor count: 41

Design and construction
- Architects: Ho & Partners Architects
- Developer: China Merchants Group
- Main contractor: Chun Wo Construction & Engineering

The Westpoint
- Chinese: 西港中心
- Literal meaning: West Hong Kong Centre
Transcriptions
Standard Mandarin
- Hanyu Pinyin: Xīgǎng Zhōngxīn
Yue: Cantonese
- Jyutping: sai1 gong2 zung1 sam1

The Westpoint (Chinese: 西港中心) is a skyscraper located in the Sai Ying Pun district of Hong Kong. The tower rises 41 floors and 186 metres (610 ft) in height. The building was completed in 1999. It was designed by architectural firm Ho & Partners Architects, and was constructed by Chun Wo Construction & Engineering. The Westpoint, which stands as the 84th-tallest building in Hong Kong, is composed entirely of office space. The building is architecturally unique due to its ball structure that adorns the roof; the ball is home to a private club.

The building was originally meant to serve as the headquarters of the Chinese state-owned corporation China Merchants Group, but was sold to the Liaison Office of the Central People's Government in the Hong Kong Special Administrative Region in the early 2000s. The entire building is occupied by this office and the ground level is heavily fortified and protected by security. The top level houses the director's office, a clubhouse, and a grand ballroom. Other features of the building include a gym, a conference centre, banquet facilities, exhibition space, and a beauty salon with barbers from mainland China.

== See also ==
- List of tallest buildings in Hong Kong
