= Hong Kong Liaison Office =

Office of the central government of China in Hong Kong SAR

Liaison Office of the Central People's Government in the Hong Kong Special Administrative Region
- 中央人民政府 駐香港特別行政區聯絡辦公室
- Logo of the Liaison Office

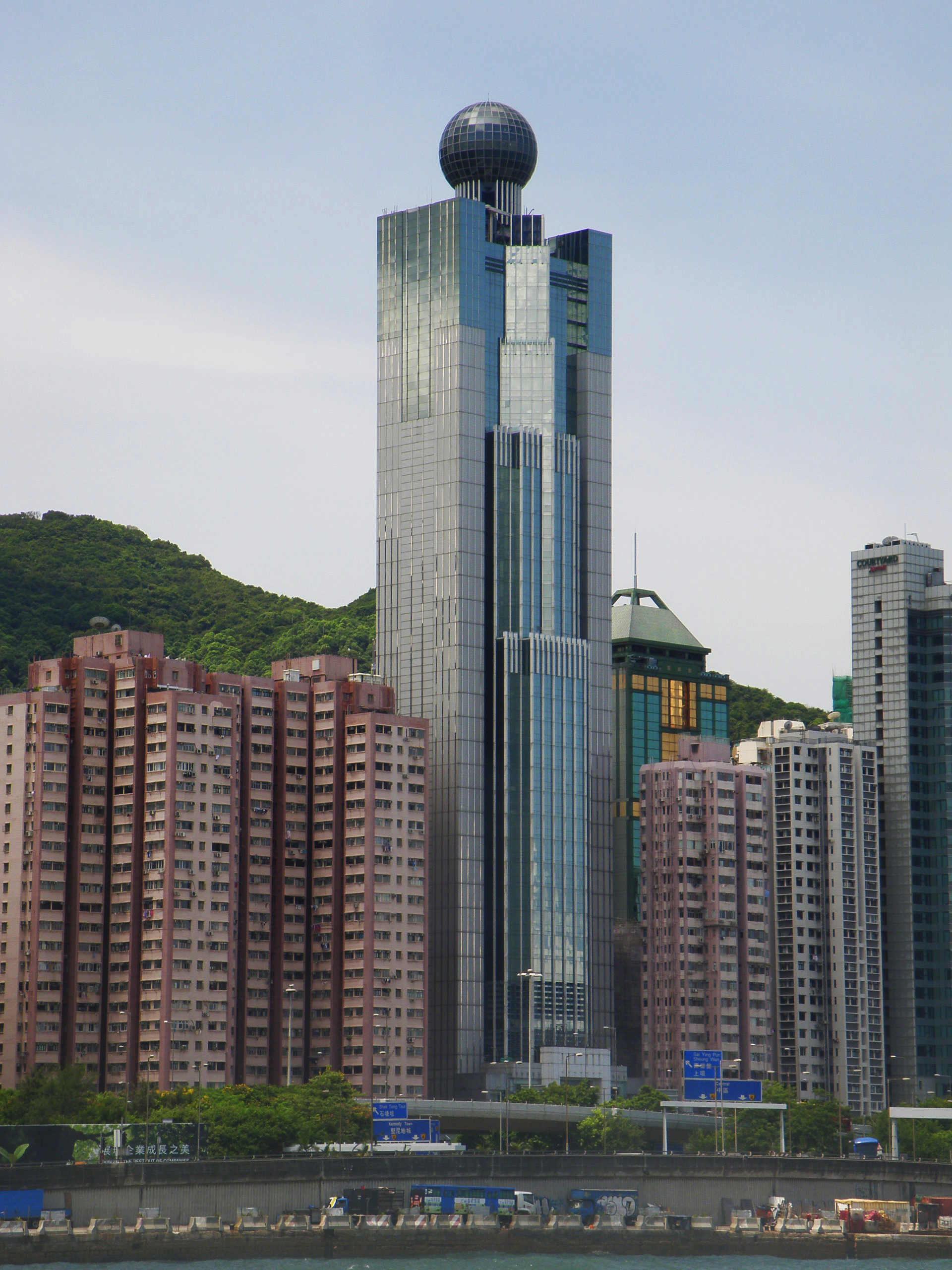
- The Westpoint in 2015

Agency overview
- Formed: 18 January 2000; 26 years ago
- Preceding agency: Xinhua News Agency Hong Kong Branch
- Jurisdiction: Government of China
- Headquarters: The Westpoint 160 Connaught Road West, Sai Ying Pun, Hong Kong; 22.288111°N 114.139822°E
- Agency executive: Zhou Ji, Director
- Parent agency: State Council of the People's Republic of China; Central Committee of the Chinese Communist Party
- Website: locpg.gov.cn locpg.hk

Hong Kong Liaison Office
- Simplified Chinese: 中央人民政府驻香港特别行政区联络办公室
- Traditional Chinese: 中央人民政府駐香港特別行政區聯絡辦公室
Transcriptions
Standard Mandarin
- Hanyu Pinyin: Zhōngyāng Rénmín Zhèngfǔ Zhù Xiānggǎng Tèbié Xíngzhèngqū Liánluò Bàngōngshì
Yue: Cantonese
- Jyutping: zung1 joeng1 jan4 man4 zing3 fu2 zyu3 hoeng1 gong2 dak6 bit6 hang4 zing3 keoi1 lyun4 lok3 baan6 gung1 sat1

LOCPG
- Simplified Chinese: 香港中联办
- Traditional Chinese: 香港中聯辦
Transcriptions
Standard Mandarin
- Hanyu Pinyin: Xiānggǎng Zhōngliánbàn
Yue: Cantonese
- Jyutping: hoeng1 gong2 zung1 lyun4 baan6

The Liaison Office of the Central People's Government in the Hong Kong Special Administrative Region (LOCPG HK) is the representative office of the Central People's Government of the People's Republic of China in Hong Kong. It is located in Sai Wan, Hong Kong Island. Under the system "one institution with two names," it also holds the alternative name of the Hong Kong Work Committee of the Central Committee of the Chinese Communist Party.

The Xinhua News Agency Hong Kong Branch was established in May 1947, and acted as the unofficial representative of the government of China in Hong Kong until the handover of Hong Kong, in 1997. On 18 January 2000, the Hong Kong Branch transferred all its work except news to the newly established Hong Kong Liaison Office.

The Liaison Office is one of the four agencies of the Central People's Government in Hong Kong, the other three being the Office of the Commissioner of the Ministry of Foreign Affairs (responsible for Hong Kong's foreign affairs), the People's Liberation Army Hong Kong Garrison (responsible for Hong Kong's defense) and the Office for Safeguarding National Security of the Central People's Government in Hong Kong (responsible for Hong Kong's national security affairs). The Liaison Office has three offices in mainland China, namely the Guangdong Liaison Office (located in Guangzhou), the Shenzhen Liaison Office and the Beijing Office.

== History ==
=== Origins ===
The office was established in May 1947 under the name Xinhua News Agency Hong Kong Branch and was the de facto mission to Hong Kong when the city was under British colonial rule. The Liaison Office was established in 2000 to take on the liaison functions of Xinhua. It succeeded Xinhua to promote the pro-Beijing united front and coordinate with the pro-Beijing camp, mobilising supporters to vote for "patriotic" political parties and clandestinely orchestrating electoral campaigns.

=== 2000–2003: Supporting Tung administration and 2003 July 1, protest ===
In late 2001, the Liaison Office coordinated and mobilised support among pro-Beijing elites for Chief Executive Tung Chee-hwa to run for another term of office. Jiang Enzhu, director of the Liaison Office, and Gao Siren openly supported Tung. A Hong Kong representative of the Chinese People's Political Consultative Conference (CPPCC) expressed that he felt pressured to join the campaign, otherwise his non-cooperation would be reported to the Liaison Office.

The Liaison Office was criticised for meddling in the election of the Hong Kong deputies to the 10th National People's Congress (NPC). It was accused of issuing a recommendation list to the electors before the election. James Tien of the Liberal Party criticised the Liaison Office for circulating the recommendation lists, the Democratic Party's Martin Lee viewed it as a "shadow government" meddling in elections in all levels, including the Chief Executive elections, coordinating with pro-Beijing parties in Legislative Council and District Council elections, and raising funds for the Democratic Alliance for the Betterment of Hong Kong (DAB).

The Liaison Office led by Gao Siren backed the Chief Executive Tung Chee-hwa government to push forward the controversial legislation of the national security bill as stipulated in the Hong Kong Basic Law Article 23. It was criticised for its failure in accurately reporting to Beijing the massive discontent toward the Tung regime and failure in predicting the unprecedented 2003 July 1 massive demonstration against the national security bill. It was said that the Liaison Office was too close to the pro-Beijing Hong Kong elites and naturally provided over-positive reports on the HKSAR to Beijing. As a result, the central government removed and replaced a number of deputy directors of the Liaison Office. A spy scandal was also revealed which involved the leaking out of confidential information of the Liaison Office to British agents.

=== After 2003: The "Second Government" ===
After the pro-democracy tide in 2003, the Liaison Office established two new departments, one for police affairs and another for community organisations. It adopted a hard-line policy toward the democrats. In the 2004 Legislative Council election, the Liaison Office mobilised the members of the pro-Beijing interest groups and housing associations, including the Hokkien community, to support and vote for the DAB and the Hong Kong Federation of Trade Unions (FTU) candidates.

Beijing also strengthened the Liaison Office to influence day-to-day affairs in Hong Kong and effectively operated as a "second government" in Hong Kong, reviewing and approving all potential candidates in the elections. Cao Erbao, director of the Liaison Office's Research Department who coined the "second government" concept, wrote that Hong Kong went from being ruled by one entity to being ruled by two: the Hong Kong government and "a team of Central and Mainland authorities carrying out Hong Kong work." It sparked great controversy in some sectors of Hong Kong society, already worried about the growing interference of the People's Republic of China into Hong Kong's political affairs. Since 2010, Hong Kong protesters began targeting the Liaison Office as the destination of the demonstrations.

The Liaison Office worked on nurturing better educated candidates from the middle class to compete with the pro-democrats including Starry Lee and Chan Hak-kan of the DAB in the 2008 Legislative Council election. It also opposed the pro-business Liberal Party which caused the 2008 electoral defeats of James Tien and Selina Chow which wiped out the directly elected seats of the Liberal Party and a split within the party which saw four of its seven legislators quit the party.

The Liaison Office was accused of rigging in the 2011 District Council election where one elected district councilor was found to be a previous staff of the Liaison Office.

=== Since 2012: "Sai Wan ruling Hong Kong" ===
In early 2012, the Liaison Office, located in Sai Wan district, aggressively lobbied the Election Committee members for Leung Chun-ying to be elected in the Chief Executive election. The Liaison Office was accused of lobbying the 60 members of the Agriculture and Fisheries Subsector to nominate Leung in order to enter the race. It was reported that the Liaison Office pressured the pro-Beijing members of the Legislative Council, including Jeffrey Lam, Andrew Leung, Sophie Lau, and Abraham Shek, who nominated Henry Tang, Leung's main rival, not to support the pan-democrats' motion of setting up a commission to investigate Leung Chun-ying's conflict of interest scandal in the West Kowloon Cultural District project. Cao Erbao reportedly telephoned and pressed Prof Gabriel Leung, the Director of the Office of the Chief Executive, to slow a conflict of interest investigation in the project that threatened to cast Leung in a bad light. This allegation sparked a controversy in which the pan-democracy camp and business community condemned the Liaison Office of meddling into Hong Kong domestic affairs. The pan-democrat Election Committee members held a slogan of "No to Sai Wan ruling Hong Kong" in the polling station on the election day, in which the term was popularised in the following years. Leung Chun-ying was also criticised of undermining the "One Country, Two Systems" principle when he made a high-profile visit to the Liaison Office a day after his victory.

In the 2012 Legislative Council election, various candidates, including Priscilla Leung and Paul Tse, were accused of being backed by the Liaison Office. The Liaison Office was also accused of orchestrating the 2016 Legislative Council election. The term "Sai Wan Party" also became popular during the election, when several pro-Beijing candidates, including Priscilla Leung, Paul Tse, Regina Ip, Junius Ho, and Eunice Yung were perceived to be backed by the Liaison Office, all of whom were elected with Liaison Office's support.

Starting from the end of August 2016, Sing Pao Daily News, which is known to be pro-Beijing, has been running anonymous critiques of Chief Executive Leung Chun-ying and the Liaison Office. The paper accused Leung and the Liaison Office of "inciting" Hong Kong independence and accused the Liaison Office of interfering in Hong Kong's domestic affairs and manipulating local Legislative Council elections by supporting groups that divide the pro-democracy camp, including the localist groups such as Youngspiration which had pro-independence tendency. The paper then urged the Central Commission for Discipline Inspection (CCDI) of the Chinese Communist Party to investigate Leung and Zhang Xiaoming, the Director of the Liaison Office, over power abuse.

In the 2016 Hong Kong legislative election, it was reported that the Hong Kong Liaison Office had been trying to "allocate" the votes to Elizabeth Quat, Gary Chan, and Eunice Yung. The office also tried to allocated votes to Christine Fong, in the hopes of defeating Leung Kwok-hung, who was competing directly with Fong for the marginal seats.

In the 2017 Chief Executive election, the Liaison Office reportedly canvassed for Carrie Lam behind the scenes, informing senior editors of the local pro-Beijing newspapers that Carrie Lam was Beijing's preferred candidate ahead of her declaration of candidacy and has actively lobbied for Lam. The senior editors were told to "gradually devote more extensive coverage" to Lam.

On 15 January 2018, during a public opening ceremony, Wang Zhimin, director of Beijing's Liaison Office confirmed Beijing's interference, and said he and Chief Executive Carrie Lam Cheng Yuet-ngor shared the same wish that “Sai Wan” and “Central” must “walk together”, cooperating in an even closer fashion.

On 21 July 2019, protesters surrounded the Hong Kong Liaison Office and defaced the Chinese national emblem, an act that was condemned by the government.

In October 2020, SCMP reported that an employee from the Liaison Office had told lawmakers to not meet with officials from the Five Eyes (Australia, Britain, Canada, New Zealand, and the United States) or countries from Europe.

On 30 October 2020, a 44-year-old employee of the Liaison Office was confirmed to have COVID-19, with case 5321. He arrived in Hong Kong from Shenzhen on October 6, and was exempted from quarantine, being a government official. Residents at his apartment (10-16 Ching Wah Street in North Point, a building owned by the Liaison Office) were required to undergo virus testing. Additionally, people at his office (West Wing of Shun Tak, which he traveled to in a company vehicle) were required to undergo virus testing, and 11 coworkers were required to undergo quarantine.

In November 2020, following the expulsion of 4 pro-democracy lawmakers from the Legislative Council, the Liaison Office said, "The political rule that Hong Kong must be governed by patriots shall be firmly guarded."

At the end of November 2020, the Liaison Office reportedly onboarded Zheng Lin as its Publicity Department's deputy minister.

The Liaison Office condemned the pro-democracy camp for organizing primaries for the 2020 Legislative Council, stating that they were ignoring possible breaches of the law. Additionally, the Liaison Office singled out Benny Tai, stating that they "believe that the general public can clearly see the evil intentions of Benny Tai and others, and the harm caused to Hong Kong society."

In January 2021, it was reported that at least half of the 480 employees at the headquarters (The Westpoint) were reshuffled and that many of them had no previous connections to Hong Kong.

In February 2021, the Liaison Office issued orders to members of the Chinese People's Political Consultative Conference, where points would be given to members who write pro-government op-eds and social media posts.

In March 2021, after the NPCSC passed legislation to allow only "patriots" to serve in the government, and also cut the number of directly elected members in the Legislative Council from 35 to 20, the Liaison Office claimed that the move would increase democracy in Hong Kong.

In October 2021, the Liaison Office met senior Hong Kong Catholic clergymen and briefed them on Xi Jinping's views on the "Sinicization" of religion, or the adoption of "Chinese characteristics" within established religions.

In April 2022, the Liaison Office met with Election Committee members and told them that the only candidate approved by Beijing for the 2022 Hong Kong Chief Executive election would be John Lee.

== Roles ==
The Liaison Office has served as an official communication bridge between Beijing and Hong Kong. According to the Liaison Office's website, the office's official functions are the following:

1. Integrate the Office of the Commissioner of the Ministry of Foreign Affairs in Hong Kong and the People's Liberation Army's Hong Kong Garrison.
2. Integrate and help the mainland relevant departments to manage Chinese investment organisations.
3. Promote economic, educational, science and technology, cultural, and athletic exchanges and cooperation between Hong Kong and the mainland. Integrate with Hong Kong people from all levels of society, and advance the exchanges between the mainland and Hong Kong. Report on the Hong Kong residents' views toward the mainland.
4. Handle relevant issues that touch upon Taiwan.
5. Undertake other matters at the direction of the central government.

The Liaison Office promotes the Central People's Government's interests in Hong Kong politics, and is responsible for liaising between Hong Kong and mainland officials. It coordinates pro-Beijing candidates, mobilising supporters to vote for pro-Beijing political parties and clandestinely orchestrating electoral campaigns. It also controls pro-Beijing media companies in Hong Kong.

== Media subsidiaries ==
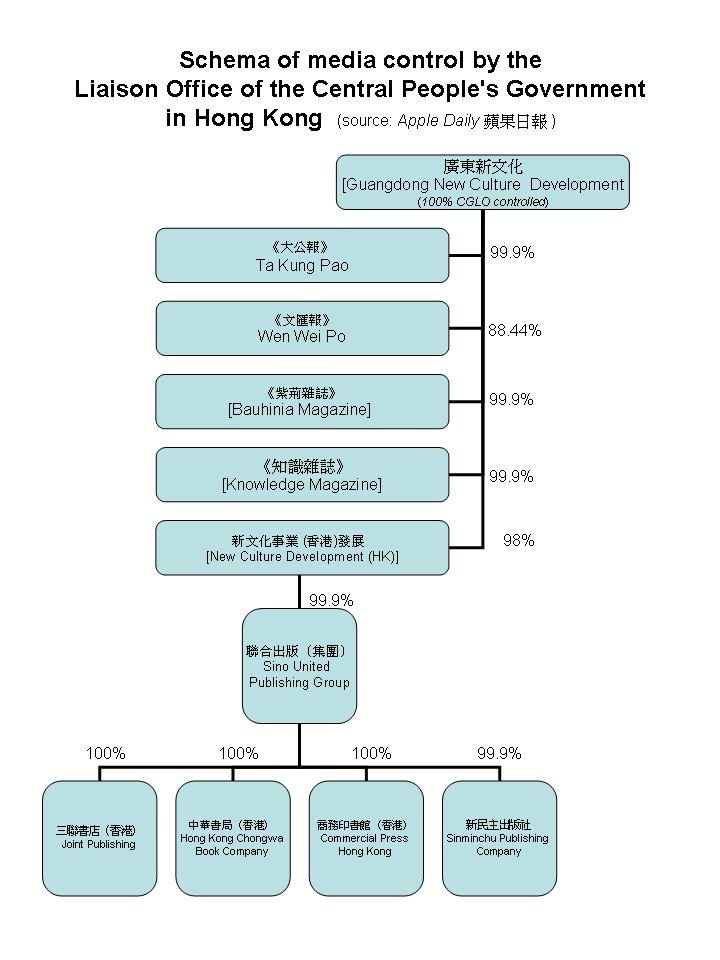
Schema of media control by the Liaison Office of the Central People's Government in Hong Kong

The Liaison Office also supervises the mainland's enterprises, including owning three pro-Beijing newspapers in Hong Kong Ta Kung Pao in Wan Chai, Wen Wei Po in Aberdeen, and Commercial Daily in Kowloon, through a subsidiary company called Guangdong New Culture Development.

In 2015, Next Magazine revealed that the Office also took control of Sino United Publishing, which controls over 80% of the book publishing market share. It is Hong Kong's largest Chinese publishing group, and has 51 retail bookstore outlets in the territory though branches of Commercial Press, Joint Publishing, Chung Hwa Book Company, and Cosmos Books. In addition, Sino United Publishing owns nearly 30 publishing houses.

In January 2021, Apple Daily reported that the Liaison Office was planning on creating and leading a state-owned cultural enterprise that would span publishing, news, film, TV, arts, and culture in Hong Kong. It is expected to be started in the beginning half of 2021, and will be managed by secretary general of the Liaison Office, Wen Hongwu.

== Property ownership ==
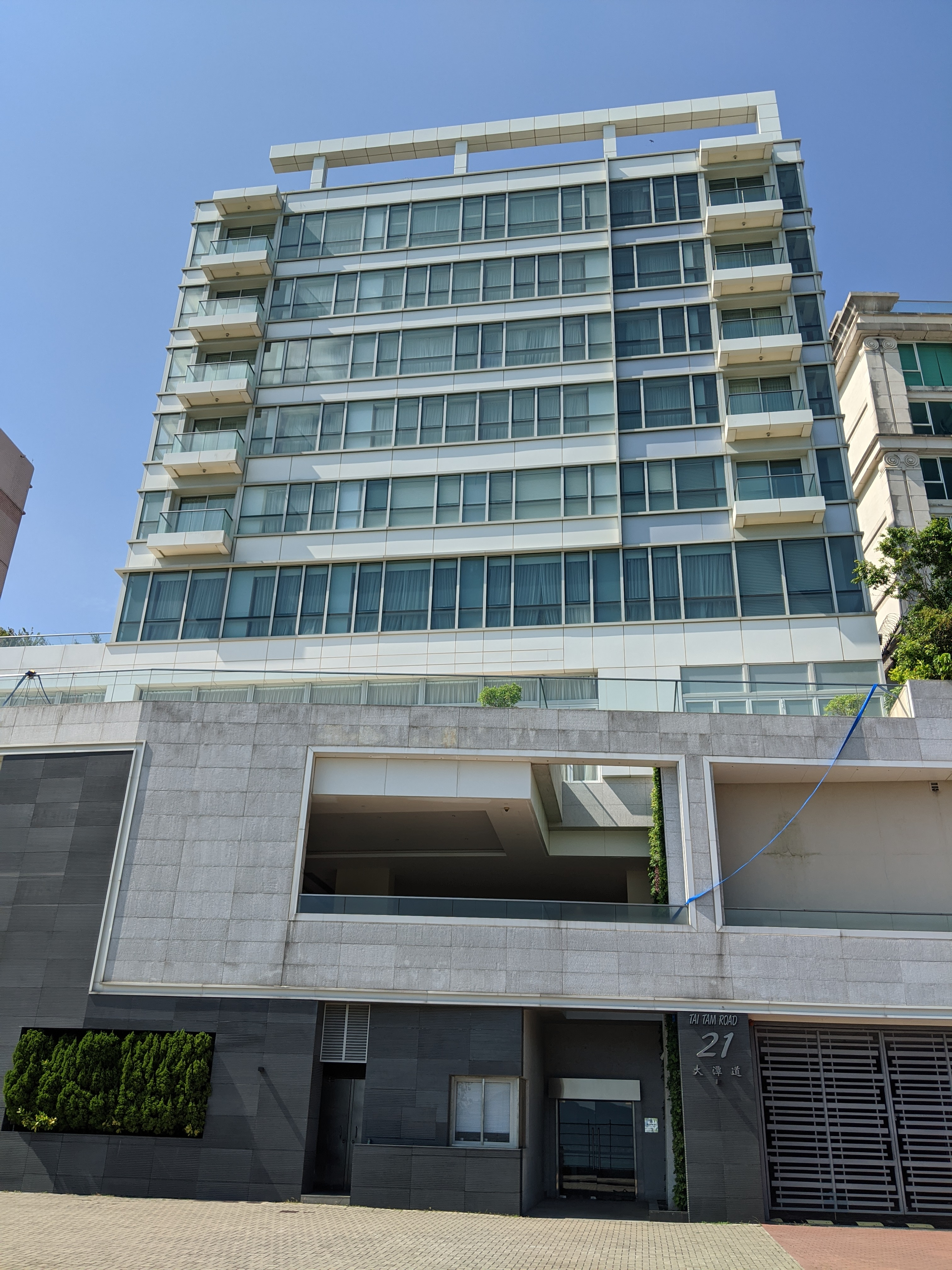
21 Tai Tam Road, Senior staff residences of the Hong Kong Liaison Office, fully owned by the Liaison Office

The Liaison Office is headquartered in Sai Ying Pun, and holds numerous other properties around Hong Kong. The Liaison Office has purchased offices and a significant number of residential apartments in Hong Kong. In an unusual setup, Newman Investment Co Ltd, a "Subsidiary company of a CPG’s organ in Hong Kong," has been identified as a subsidiary of the Liaison Office. Purchases of property have been done both through the Liaison Office and secretly through Newman Investment. Also unusual is the fact that the Liaison Office has bought housing as a benefit to its employees.

Although Newman Investment is a private company and is not registered as an incorporated public office, which would qualify it from not paying stamp duties under section 41(1) of the Stamp Duty Ordinance, Hong Kong Chief Executives have, under section 52(1) of the SDO, allowed Newman Investment to not pay stamp duties. This has allowed Newman Investment to escape stamp duties of several hundred million HKD within the last several years alone.

For the past several years, several District Council members have asked the government for a detailed breakdown of property owned by the Liaison Office and Newman Investment, as well as the reasoning for Newman Investment, a private company, to escape paying stamp duties. The government has consistently only given brief summarized results, hiding details on the transactions.

Table of Unlevied Stamp Duties in Recent Years
Financial Year	Organization	Stamp Duty Involved ($M HKD)	# of Properties Involved	Locations
2012-13	Newman	1.9	15	TBD
2013-14		0	0	
2014-15	Liaison Office	52.3	6	5 (Kwun Tong) 1 (Central and Western)
2015-16	Newman	15.6	15	5 (Central and Western) 10 (Sha Tin)
2016-17	Newman	8.4	8	6 (Central and Western) 2 (Kowloon City)
2017-18		0	0	
2018-19	Newman	47.9	25	23 (Central and Western) 2 (Sha Tin)
2019-20	Newman	80.4	22	2 (Central and Western) 20 (Kwun Tong)

In April 2020, Demosisto distributed a press release, showing the extent of property purchases by the Liaison Office and Newman Investment. In the press release, it was shown that as of the end of February 2019, 722 residential units had been purchased, with 156 purchased by the Liaison Office, and the remaining 566 purchased through Newman Investment.

In Newman Investment's February 2020 Annual Return (NAR1), it listed the Company Secretary as Xiao Xiaosan, and the four remaining directors as Chen Zhibin, Li Xuhong, Sun Zhongxin, and Chen Dunzhou. According to SCMP, the directors of Newman have been officials from the Liaison Office's Administration and Finance Department.

== Article 22 of the Basic Law ==
The Liaison Office is often criticised of acting beyond its jurisdiction and violating the "One Country, Two Systems" principle and the Hong Kong Basic Law as "no department of the Central People's Government and no province, autonomous region, or municipality directly under the Central Government may interfere in the affairs which the Hong Kong Special Administrative Region administers on its own in accordance with this Law" as stipulated in the Article 22 of the Basic Law.

The Liaison Office was "set up in the HKSAR by the central government in accordance with Article 22(2) of the Basic Law" according to the Hong Kong government's Information Services Department. However, in April 2020, the Central People's Government said that the Liaison Office was not classified under Article 22, and claimed their ability to "exercise supervision and express solemn attitudes on affairs regarding Hong Kong".

== Organization ==
The Hong Kong Liaison Office functions as the external name of the Hong Kong Work Committee of the Central Committee of the Chinese Communist Party (Chinese: 中共中央香港工作委員會). The Liaison Office has the following institutions:

=== Internal organization ===
- General Office
- Human Resources Department
- Publicity, Culture and Sports Department
- Coordination Department
- Research Department
- Community Liaison Department
- Social Work Department
- Department of Economic Affairs
- Department of Education and Science
- Taiwan Affairs Department
- Youth Work Department
- Legal Department
- Office Work Department
- Information and Consultation Room
- Security Department
- Police Liaison Department
- Administration and Finance Department
- Information Center
- Hong Kong Office
- Kowloon Work Department
- New Territories Work Department
- Beijing Liaison Department
- Guangdong Liaison Department
- Shenzhen Liaison Department

=== List of directors ===
No.	Portrait	Name	Term of office		Duration	Premier	Chief Executive	Ref
1		Jiang Enzhu 姜恩柱	18 January 2000	21 August 2002	2 years, 215 days	Zhu Rongji (1993−2003)	Tung Chee-hwa (1997−2005)	
2		Gao Siren 高祀仁	21 August 2002	25 May 2009	6 years, 277 days	Zhu Rongji (1993−2003)	Tung Chee-hwa (1997−2005)	
2		Gao Siren 高祀仁	21 August 2002	25 May 2009	6 years, 277 days	Wen Jiabao (2003−2013)	Tung Chee-hwa (1997−2005)	
2		Gao Siren 高祀仁	21 August 2002	25 May 2009	6 years, 277 days	Wen Jiabao (2003−2013)	Donald Tsang (2005−2012)	
3		Peng Qinghua 彭清華	25 May 2009	18 December 2012	3 years, 207 days	Wen Jiabao (2003−2013)	Donald Tsang (2005−2012)	
3		Peng Qinghua 彭清華	25 May 2009	18 December 2012	3 years, 207 days	Wen Jiabao (2003−2013)	CY Leung (2012−2017)	
4		Zhang Xiaoming 張曉明	18 December 2012	22 September 2017	4 years, 278 days	Wen Jiabao (2003−2013)	CY Leung (2012−2017)	
4		Zhang Xiaoming 張曉明	18 December 2012	22 September 2017	4 years, 278 days	Li Keqiang (2013−2023)	CY Leung (2012−2017)	
4		Zhang Xiaoming 張曉明	18 December 2012	22 September 2017	4 years, 278 days	Li Keqiang (2013−2023)	Carrie Lam (2017−2022)	
5		Wang Zhimin 王志民	22 September 2017	4 January 2020	2 years, 104 days	Li Keqiang (2013−2023)	Carrie Lam (2017−2022)	
6		Luo Huining 駱惠寧	6 January 2020	14 January 2023	3 years, 8 days	Li Keqiang (2013−2023)	Carrie Lam (2017−2022)	
6		Luo Huining 駱惠寧	6 January 2020	14 January 2023	3 years, 8 days	Li Keqiang (2013−2023)	John Lee Ka-chiu (2022−present)	
7		Zheng Yanxiong 郑雁雄	14 January 2023	30 May 2025	2 years, 133 days	Li Keqiang (2013−2023)	John Lee Ka-chiu (2022−present)	
7		Zheng Yanxiong 郑雁雄	14 January 2023	30 May 2025	2 years, 133 days	Li Qiang (2023−present)	John Lee Ka-chiu (2022−present)	
8		Zhou Ji 周霁	30 May 2025	Incumbent		Li Qiang (2023−present)	John Lee Ka-chiu (2022−present)	

=== Deputy directors ===
There are 7 deputy directors. In April 2021, a deputy director, Tan Tieniu, rejected claims that the decision by the NPCSC to have only "patriots" serve in the government was a step back for democracy in the city.

In October 2025, Sun Shangwu, former deputy editor-in-chief of China Daily took the position of deputy director of publicity of the Liaison Office.

== Gallery ==
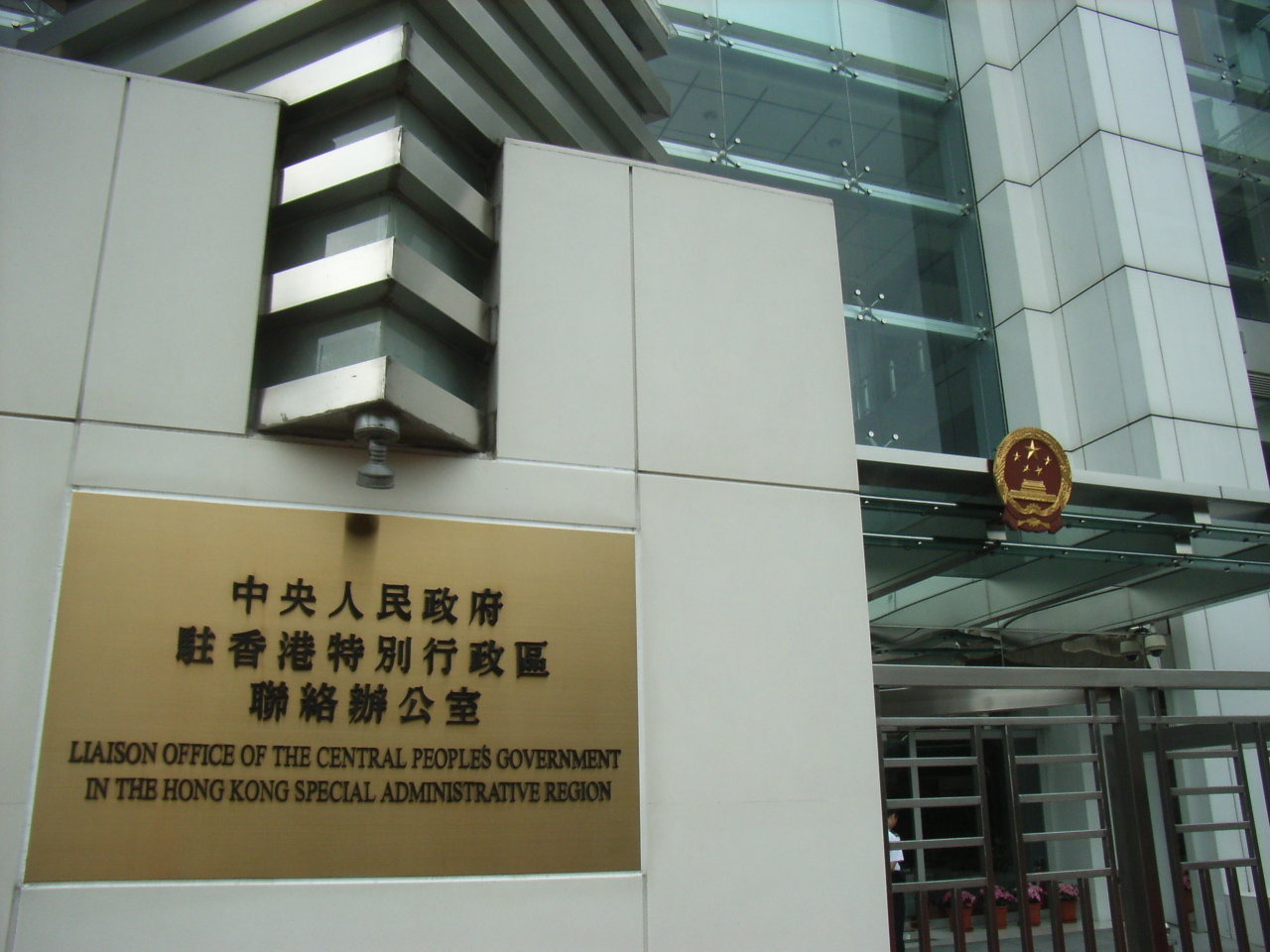
Sign at entrance

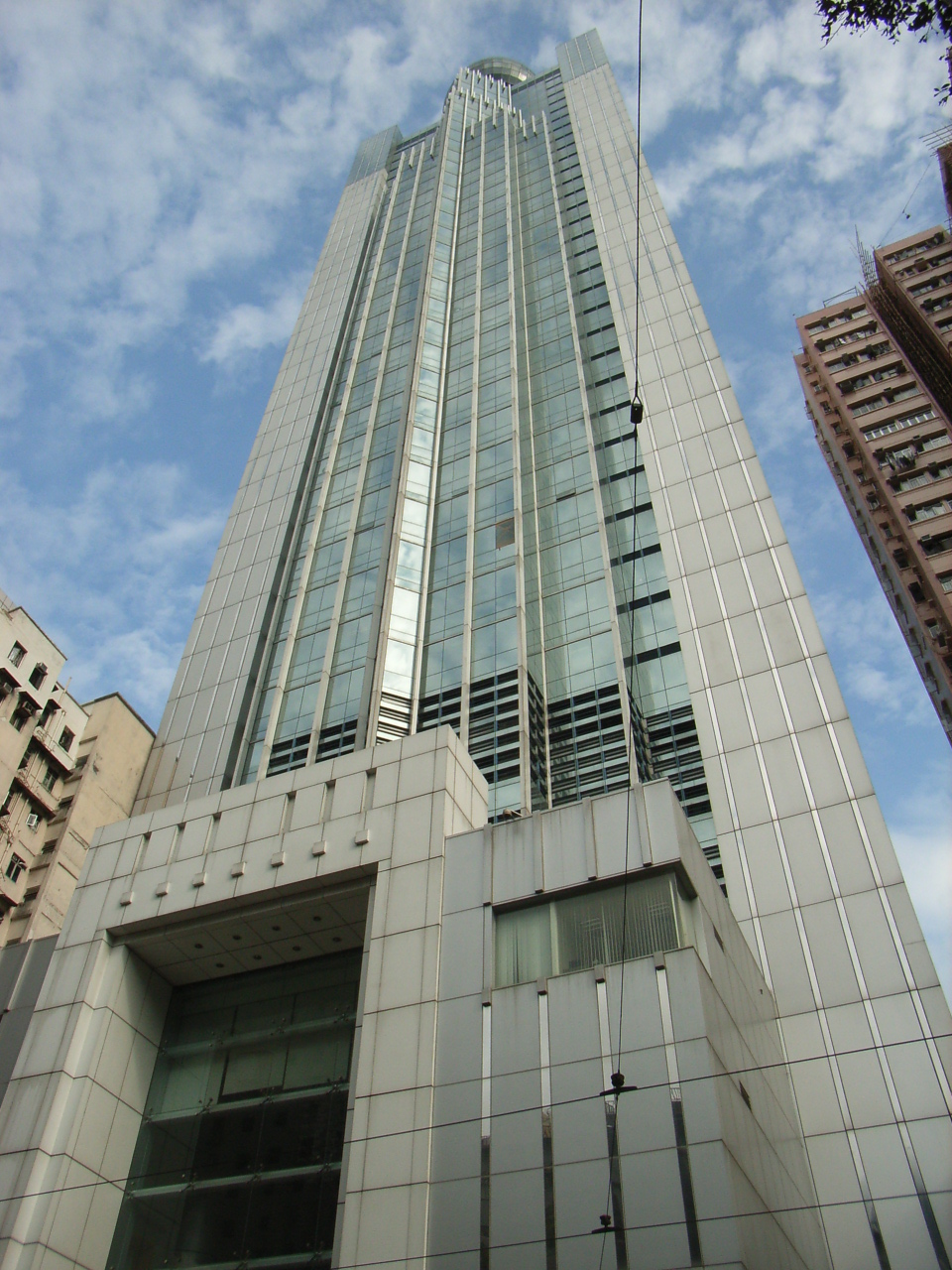
Entrance on Des Voeux Road West

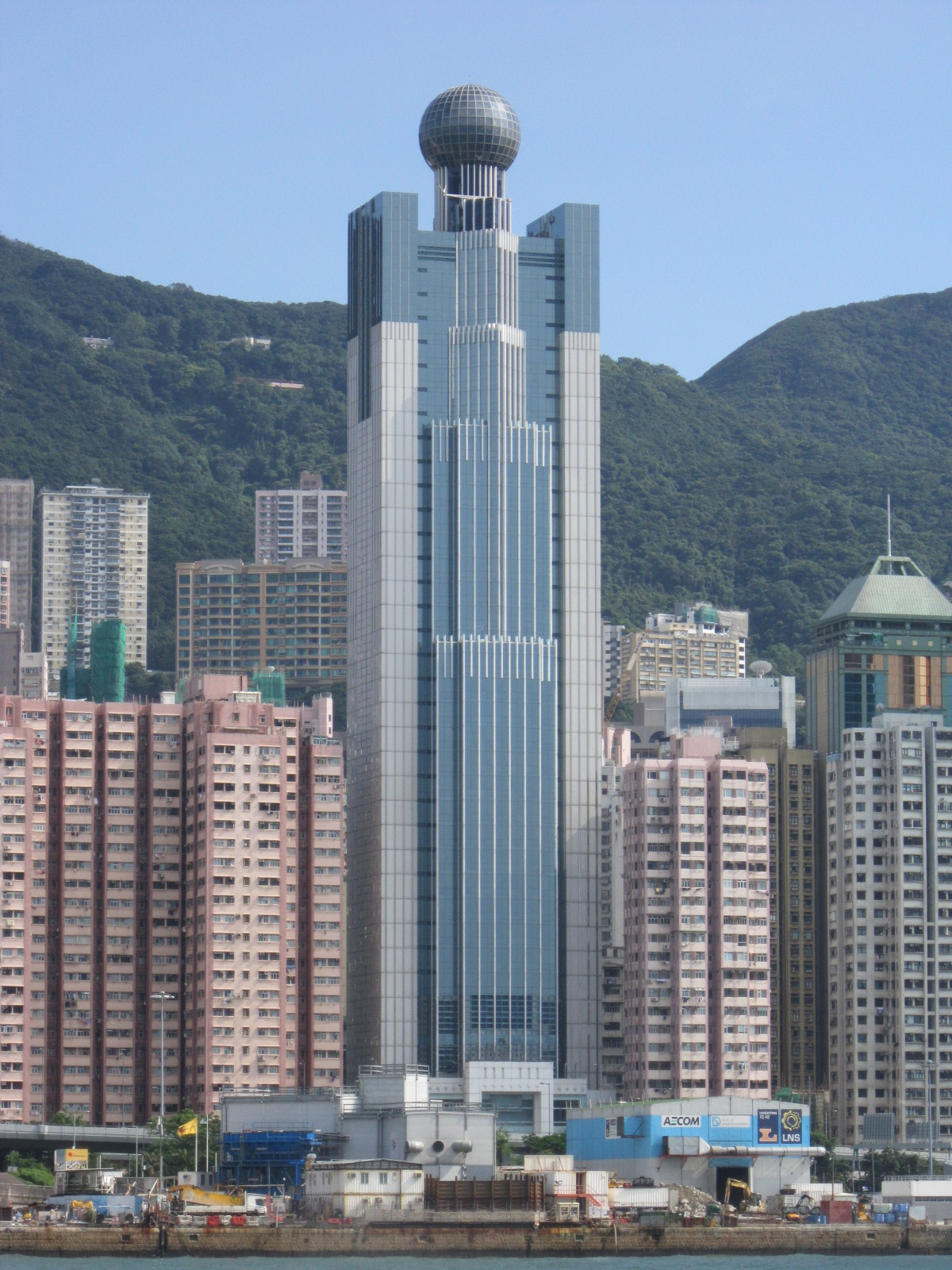
View from Victoria Harbour

== See also ==
- Office of the Commissioner of the Ministry of Foreign Affairs of the People's Republic of China in the Hong Kong Special Administrative Region
- Office for Safeguarding National Security
- Hong Kong and Macau Work Office
- Macau Liaison Office
- Hong Kong Office in Beijing
- One country, two systems
