= Li Jiangzhou =

Li Jiangzhou (Chinese: 李江舟; pinyin: Lǐ Jiāngzhōu; born January 1968 in Anhui, China) is a deputy director of the Office for Safeguarding National Security in Hong Kong. He is a former public security officer and has worked in the liaison office since 2016.

== Sanctions ==
On 9 November 2020, the United States sanctioned Li under Executive Order 13936 for his role in implementing the National Security Law.
