= Sheung-yuen Lee =

Hong Kong civil servant and diplomat

Sheung-yuen Lee (Chinese: 李湘原), or Pedro Sheung-yuen Lee, is a former Hong Kong civil servant and diplomat, and a Reform UK candidate in the 2026 UK local election.

Prior emigrating to the United Kingdom, he has served as director of the Hong Kong Economic and Trade Office in Bangkok and acting director of the Hong Kong Economic and Trade Office in Jakarta. Positions that Financial Times described as the "de facto senior diplomat" and he remained in his post after the introduction of the 2020 Hong Kong national security law, which required civil servants to declare loyalty to the Hong Kong government under Chinese sovereignty. He also publicly expressed support for the law, which has been widely criticised by international observers for restricting freedoms and suppressing dissent in Hong Kong.

== Biography ==
Lee was educated at St. Stephen's College and, during his secondary school years, obtained a Licentiate Diploma in Piano Performance from Trinity College London. He decided to pursue a career in politics after facing various challenges while organizing concert tours in the United States and Canada during the summers of 1993 and 1994, as well as while participating in the International Mathematical Olympiad. After graduating from the University of Michigan in 1997, he returned to Hong Kong and joined the Hong Kong Government in 1999 as an Administrative Officer.

In 2015, he was posted to the Commerce and Economic Development Bureau, where he served as Political Assistant to the Secretary and later as Assistant Commissioner for Tourism. He was subsequently assigned to Bangkok to prepare for the establishment of the Hong Kong Economic and Trade Office there, becoming its inaugural Director upon its opening on 28 February 2019.

In 2022, Lee publicly expressed support for the Hong Kong National Security Law on multiple occasions. He stated that since the enactment of the law and the reform of the electoral system to ensure that "patriots govern Hong Kong," the city had returned to the correct path of "one country, two systems." He also argued that by adhering to this principle and leveraging its unique advantages—such as participation in the Belt and Road Initiative, development of the Guangdong–Hong Kong–Macao Greater Bay Area, and integration into the "dual circulation" strategy—Hong Kong would be able to make greater contributions to national development and move toward a more prosperous future.

From September 2022, Lee concurrently served as acting director of the Hong Kong Economic and Trade Office in Jakarta. After Parson Lam Chun-wah assumed the post of director of the Bangkok office on 4 September 2023, Lee continued as director of the Jakarta office. He left the Hong Kong civil service in November 2023 and later relocated to Acton, London, where he has been engaged in music-related work.

In the 2026 United Kingdom local elections, he stood as a Reform UK candidate for a council seat in the London Borough of Ealing. Reform UK replied to Financial Times, saying Lee signed declaration of loyalty to Hong Kong government "without which he would have lost his job".

== See also ==
- 2024 Hong Kong trade office spy case
