= Hong Kong Economic and Trade Office Certification Act =

Hong Kong Economic and Trade Office (HKETO) Certification Act
- Long title: An act to require the President to remove the extension of certain privileges, exemptions, and immunities to the Hong Kong Economic and Trade Offices if Hong Kong no longer enjoys a high degree of autonomy from the People’s Republic of China, and for other purposes.

Legislative history
- Introduced in the House of Representatives on February 17, 2023; Committee consideration by Committee on Foreign Affairs, Committee on Rules; Passed the House on September 10, 2024 (413–3)

The Hong Kong Economic and Trade Office Certification Act is a United States Congress proposed bill that could close Hong Kong Economic and Trade Offices. The bill received bipartisan support in the House of Representatives and was sent to the Senate.

== Background ==
Hong Kong has 14 overseas Hong Kong Economic and Trade Offices (HKETOs). Three were based in the United States, in New York, San Francisco, and Washington DC. They gained quasi-diplomatic privileges similar to other international bodies.

These offices were found to have lobbying against bills supporting Hong Kong opposition, including the Hong Kong Human Rights and Democracy Act, after the outbreak of the large scale protests in 2019. Support for closure amplified as China implemented national security law in Hong Kong a year later which was seen as an erosion to the city's autonomy. Hong Kong Watch, a UK-based human rights organization, urged foreign governments to reconsider the roles of these representatives.

In May 2024, British police uncovered an operation by the London HKETO that targets exiled Hong Kong activists, renewing calls to close the trade missions in both the UK and the US.

== Legislative history ==
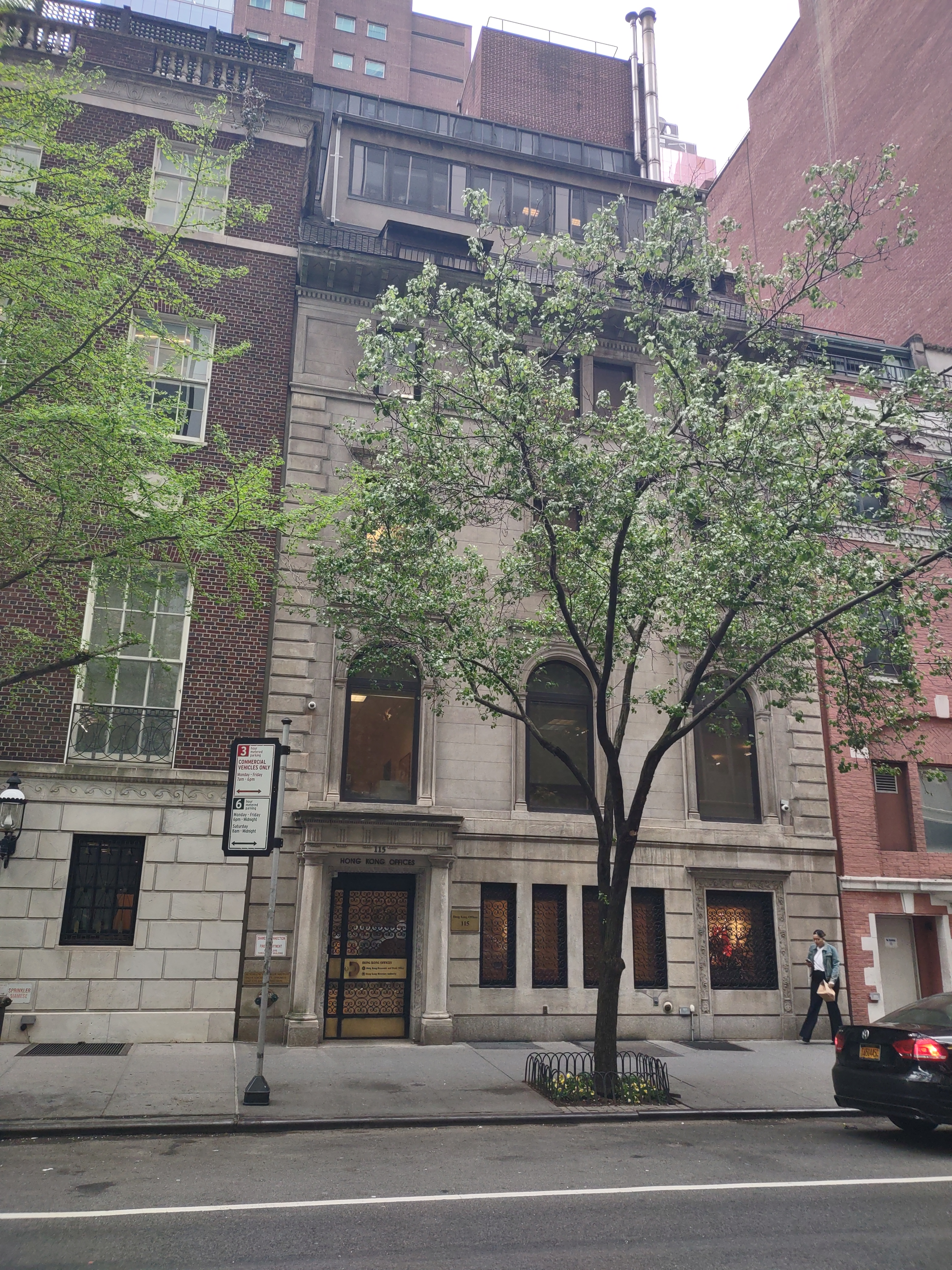
HKETO in New York, in 2023

The United States–China Economic and Security Review Commission published the annual report in November 2022 that considered Hong Kong security authorities has continued the assault on Hong Kong's freedom. The report also recommended reviewing the status of the HKETOs. Marco Rubio from the Senate and Chris Smith from the House, who was the chair of Congressional-Executive Commission on China (CECC), introduced the bill a month later, which was later lapsed as the 117th Congress came to an end. The bill was re-introduced on 17 February 2023. It calls on the President of the United States to "remove the extension of certain privileges, exemptions, and immunities to the HKETOs" and terminate their operations within 180 days if they determine that Hong Kong no longer enjoys a high degree of autonomy from China.

The House Committee on Foreign Affairs passed the bill in November 2023, prompting rebuke from Hong Kong.

The House adopted the bill by 413–3 on 10 September 2024, as a series of China-related legislations were scrutinized during the "China week". Those voted against include Nydia Velázquez and Mark Takano, who supported Hong Kong protestors in 2019 said the nay vote was an accident. Tom McClintock said the bill restricts trade and harms American economy, believing it should be decided by the Congress but not president.

== Reaction ==
=== China and Hong Kong ===
The Hong Kong government released a statement, calling the House's "fact-twisting attack on Hong Kong is politically driven", and violates international law while severely damaging the normal economic relations between the United States and Hong Kong. It added the "political manoeuvre"-legislation "maliciously slanders" the security laws in Hong Kong. Commerce Secretary Algernon Yau said the bill is "purely political" without benefiting oneself, while Executive Council convenor Regina Ip urged US president Joe Biden not to sign the act.

The Chinese embassy in the United States lodged a "solemn representation" denouncing the bill. It criticized the United States for manipulating Hong Kong issues. Slamming the bill as one of the "sinister laws", the embassy threatened countermeasures if it continued to advance.

=== United States ===
Chris Smith said the legislation is "a necessary next step in tangibly demonstrating our solidarity with the persecuted citizens of Hong Kong".

Several Hong Kong groups hailed the passage of the bill. Anna Kwok, executive director of the Hong Kong Democracy Council who was wanted by the Hong Kong government, said it "serves as a much-needed response to hold the Hong Kong government accountable for their blatant human-rights abuses". The council also said it is a "major step forward" in holding HKETOs accountable.
