= Paul Tang =

Paul Tang may refer to:

- Paul Tang (civil servant) (born 1958), Hong Kongese civil servant
- Paul Tang (politician) (born 1967), Dutch politician
