= Clement Cheung =

Former Hong Kong Government official

The Honourable Clement Cheung GBS, JP
- 張雲正

Secretary for the Civil Service
- In office 21 July 2015 – 30 June 2017
- Chief Executive: Leung Chun-ying
- Preceded by: Paul Tang
- Succeeded by: Joshua Law

Commissioner of Customs and Excise
- In office 2 September 2012 – 21 July 2015
- Preceded by: Richard Yuen
- Succeeded by: Roy Tang

Personal details
- Born: 17 November 1961 (age 64) Hong Kong
- Education: University of Manchester
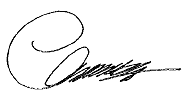
- Signature

Clement Cheung
- Traditional Chinese: 張雲正
Transcriptions
Yue: Cantonese
- Yale Romanization: Jēung Wàhn jing
- Jyutping: Zoeng^{1} Wan^{4} zing^{3}

Clement Cheung Wan-ching GBS JP (Chinese: 張雲正, born 17 November 1961) has been the chief executive officer of the Insurance Authority since August 2018. He is a member of the executive committee of the International Association of Insurance Supervisors and chair of its Audit and Risk Committee, as well as chairman of the Asian Forum of Insurance Regulators.

Cheung is a former Secretary for the Civil Service of Hong Kong and a former commissioner of Customs and Excise.

== Background ==
Cheung joined Hong Kong Civil Service in 1983 and served various roles within the government including member of Executive and Legislative Councils, Civil Service Bureau, Food and Health Bureau, Housing Department, and Handover Ceremony Co-ordination Office. In 1998, he became the director of Hong Kong Economic and Trade Office. By 2001, Cheung promoted to Deputy Secretary for Works, then Commissioner of Insurance in 2006. In 2009, he became Postmaster General of Hong Kong. Cheung was appointed as Commissioner of Customs and Excise in 2011. Before retiring from the administrative service, he was Secretary for the Civil Service.

Civic offices
Preceded by Richard Yuen	Commissioner of Customs and Excise; 2011–2015	Succeeded by Roy Tang
Political offices
Preceded by Paul Tang	Secretary for the Civil Service; 2015–2017	Succeeded by Joshua Law
