= Administrative Officer =

Administrative Officer may refer to:

- Administrative Officer (Hong Kong), a civil service grade in the Government of Hong Kong
- Administrative Officer (United Kingdom), a civil service rank in the United Kingdom
