= CRE =

CRE or cre may refer to:

== Organizations ==
- Campaign for Real Education, a British educational advocacy group
- Castle Rock Entertainment, an American film and television production company
- Center for Regulatory Effectiveness, an American lobbying firm
- China Railway Express Company, a parcel and cargo shipping arm of China Railway
- Commission de régulation de l'énergie, the French energy regulator
- Commission for Racial Equality, a former British government body
- Cumann Rothaíochta na hÉireann (Cycling Ireland), an Irish national cycling organization

== Science ==
- cAMP response element, a type of DNA sequence bound to by CREB
- Carbapenem-resistant enterobacteriaceae, an antibiotic-resistant bacteria family
- Certified Reliability Engineer, an American Society for Quality (ASQ) certification
- Chemical reaction engineering, chemical engineering or industrial chemistry dealing with chemical reactors
- Cis-acting replication element, a component of many RNA viruses
- Cis-regulatory element, regions of non-coding DNA which regulate the transcription of neighboring genes
- Cre recombinase, an enzyme that catalyzes a type of site-specific homologous recombination
- I-CreI, a homing endonuclease

== Transport ==
- CRE, LRT station abbreviation for Coral Edge LRT station, Singapore
- CRE, National Railway station code for Crewe railway station, Cheshire, England
- CRE, airport code for Grand Strand Airport near North Myrtle Beach, South Carolina, U.S.
- Chalong Rat Expressway, Thailand

== Other ==
- Camp Rock Enon, a Boy Scout camp in Virginia
- Commander, Royal Engineers, the senior Royal Engineers officer in a British Army division, usually a lieutenant-colonel
- Commercial real estate, see Commercial property
- Common Recruitment Examination, an examination for recruiting civil servants in Hong Kong
- Corporate real estate, real property held or used by a business enterprise or organization for its own operational purposes
