= Patrick Nip =

Hong Kong government official

Patrick Nip Tak-kuen GBS JP
- 聶德權
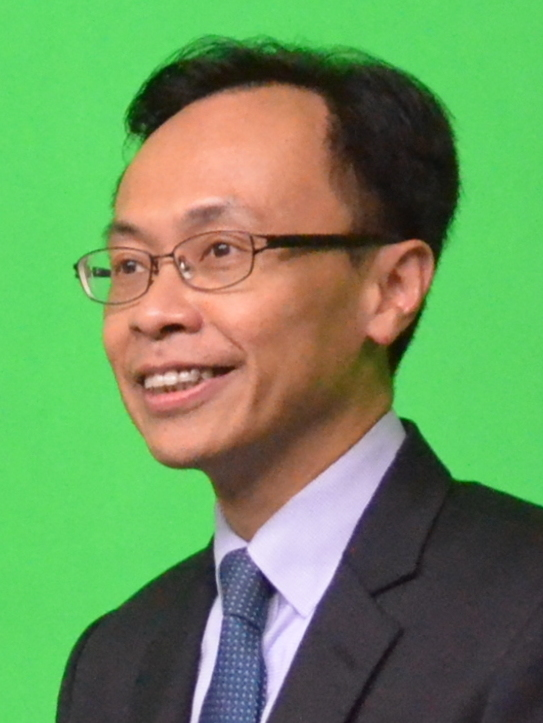

Secretary for the Civil Service
- In office 22 April 2020 – 30 June 2022
- Chief Executive: Carrie Lam
- Preceded by: Joshua Law
- Succeeded by: Ingrid Yeung

Secretary for Constitutional and Mainland Affairs
- In office 1 July 2017 – 22 April 2020
- Chief Executive: Carrie Lam
- Preceded by: Raymond Tam
- Succeeded by: Erick Tsang
Government offices
Permanent Secretary for Food and Health (Health)
In office 2016 – 30 June 2016
Secretary for Food and Health	Ko Wing-man
Preceded by	Richard Yuen
Succeeded by	Elizabeth Tse
Director of Information Services
In office 2014–2016
Preceded by	Michael Wong
Succeeded by	Joe Wong
Director of Social Welfare
In office 2009–2013
Preceded by	Stephen Fredrick Fisher
Succeeded by	Carol Yip

Personal details
- Born: 1964 (age 61–62)
- Education: University of Hong Kong (BSS); Harvard Kennedy School (MPA)

Patrick Nip Tak-kuen
- Traditional Chinese: 聶德權
- Simplified Chinese: 聂德权
Transcriptions
Standard Mandarin
- Hanyu Pinyin: Niè Déquán
Yue: Cantonese
- Jyutping: nip6 dak1 kyun4

Patrick Nip Tak-kuen GBS JP (Chinese: 聶德權; born 1964) is a Hong Kong former government official. He served as Secretary for the Civil Service from 2020 to 2022.

== Background ==
Nip attended Kwun Tong Maryknoll College and then the University of Hong Kong, graduating in 1986. He obtained a master's degree in public administration from Harvard Kennedy School and has also studied at Oxford University and attended national studies courses at the Chinese Academy of Governance.

== Career ==
Nip joined the Administrative Service in August 1986, serving in various bureaux and departments, including the City and New Territories Administration, the Deputy Chief Secretary's Office, the Trade and Industry Branch, the Finance Branch, the Civil Service Branch, the Trade Department, the Chief Executive's Office, the former Health and Welfare Bureau, the Beijing Office and the former Health, Welfare and Food Bureau.

He was appointed director of social welfare in 2009 and director (special duties) in the chief secretary for administration's private office in 2013, before becoming director of information services in February 2014. For a year from July 2016 he was permanent secretary for Food and Health (Health).

From July 2017, Nip was secretary for constitutional and mainland affairs. But in a cabinet reshuffle on 22 April 2020, Lam removed him from the role (to be replaced by Erick Tsang). The announcement came two days after Nip's office had issued (and then amended) press statements that failed to reflect Beijing's assertion that the Liaison Office and Hong Kong and Macau Affairs Office were not subject to Article 22 of the Basic Law, preventing interference in Hong Kong affairs by mainland authorities. Until then, all branches of the Hong Kong Government had always stated that they were, and indeed it was widely held that that such effect was central to the 'one country, two systems principle.

Nip immediately took up the role of Secretary for the Civil Service, controversially the first non-civil servant to hold the post, at a time of emerging political activism within Civil Service ranks and pressure from Beijing for unswerving loyalty from all Hong Kong government staff.

In February 2021, Nip announced that the government was considering creating laws that would make it illegal for citizens to insult public officials.

=== Oath taking ===
In October 2020, Nip announced a new rule, stating that civil servants who do not sign a declaration to uphold the Basic Law or do not swear allegiance to the Hong Kong government would risk losing future promotions. Apple Daily reported in October 2020 that Nip had previously said those who violate their oaths could also face dismissal and other serious consequences. In addition, he said that civil servants should "explain, implement and promote" government policies without their personal opinions, and also refrain from openly criticizing government decisions. In December 2020, Nip announced that civil servants would be given a month to sign the oath, or risk being fired or ordered to retire if their service is "not in the public interest."

On 18 January 2021, Nip again warned civil servants to not express their views publicly, warning that they could be in trouble "If he expresses his view openly, in his capacity as a civil servant, unless the matter is about the pay and conditions of the civil service, otherwise we'll have to consider whether such an expression would create conflict with his duty in the civil service, and whether that would cause misunderstanding on the administration." Additionally, he mentioned that temporary and short-term contractors and staff in the Civil Service would also be required to sign the oath.

In February 2021, Nip claimed that if civil servants genuinely accept the oath, then they should not feel threatened by it. Asked if civil servants could express their political opinions outside of work, Nip only said that there are limits to freedom of speech. In March 2021, Nip said that political neutrality means being on the government's side and not being neutral, stating that "What political neutrality actually means is that, for civil servants, they have to support the chief executive and the government of the day in doing this job, irrespective of what their personal belief would be or the political inclinations would be."

In April 2021, Nip revealed that 129 members of the Civil Service Bureau had not signed the oath, including those who thought the oath undermines freedom of speech, and said that they would be fast-tracked to be terminated. Apple Daily revealed that senior staff, including directors and administrative officers, had also resigned at a record rate compared to before the policy had taken effect.

=== National security training ===
In February 2022, Nip announced that civil servants would be required to take national security training in order to complete their probationary period. Existing civil servants would also need to take the training before getting promoted.

Government offices
Preceded by Stephen Frederick Fisher	Director of Social Welfare; 2009–2013	Succeeded by Carol Yip
Preceded by Michael Wong	Director of Information Services; 2014–2016	Succeeded by Joe Wong
Preceded by Richard Yuen	Permanent Secretary for Food and Health (Health); 2016–2017	Succeeded by Elizabeth Tse
Political offices
Preceded by Raymond Tam	Secretary for Constitutional and Mainland Affairs; 2017–2020	Succeeded by Erick Tsang
Preceded by Joshua Law	Secretary for the Civil Service; 2020–2022	Succeeded by Ingrid Yeung
