= Hermes Tang =

Hong Kong Commissioner of Customs and Excise

Hermes Tang Yi-hoi SBS CDSM CMSM
- 鄧以海
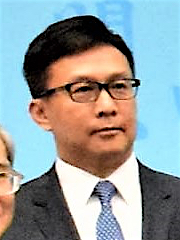

Commissioner of Customs and Excise
- In office 1 July 2017 – 21 October 2021
- Preceded by: Roy Tang
- Succeeded by: Louise Ho

Personal details
- Born: 21 October 1964 (age 61)

Hermes Tang Yi-hoi (Chinese: 鄧以海; born 1964) is a former Commissioner of Customs and Excise of Hong Kong.

Tang was the Deputy Commissioner of Customs and Excise before he was appointed Commissioner of Customs and Excise in July 2017 of the administration of Chief Executive Carrie Lam, becoming the first Commissioner not being an Administrative Officer since 1999.

Tang is a member of the Committee for Safeguarding National Security of the Hong Kong Special Administrative Region as stipulated in the national security law.

In July 2021, it was revealed that Tang was fined for breaking social-distancing rules by attending a banquet dinner at a luxury clubhouse.

On 21 October 2021, Tang was replaced by his deputy commissioner, Louise Ho.

On 5 January 2022, Carrie Lam announced new warnings and restrictions against social gathering due to potential COVID-19 outbreaks. One day later, it was discovered that Tang attended a birthday party hosted by Witman Hung Wai-man, with 222 guests. At least one guest tested positive with COVID-19, causing all guests to be quarantined.

Civic offices
Preceded by Roy Tang	Commissioner of Customs and Excise; 2017–2021	Succeeded by Louise Ho
Order of precedence
Preceded by Erick Tsang; Director of Audit	Hong Kong order of precedence Commissioner of Customs and Excise	Succeeded by Robert Ribeiro; Permanent Judge of the Court of Final Appeal
