= Bobbie Cheema-Grubb =

British judge (born 1966)

The Honourable Mrs Justice Cheema-Grubb DBE
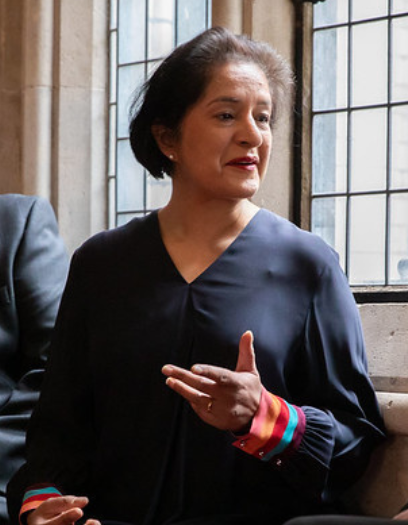

Justice of the High Court
- Incumbent
- Assumed office 25 November 2015
- Preceded by: Sir Kenneth Parker

Personal details
- Born: Parmjit Kaur Cheema; 6 October 1966 (age 60) Yorkshire, UK
- Spouse: Russell Grubb (m. 1990)
- Children: 3
- Education: City of Leeds School; King's College London

Dame Parmjit Kaur "Bobbie" Cheema-Grubb, DBE (née Cheema; born 6 October 1966), styled Mrs Justice Cheema-Grubb, is a judge of the King's Bench Division of the High Court of Justice of England and Wales. She is the first Asian woman to serve as a High Court judge in the United Kingdom.

== Early life and education ==
Parmjit Kaur Cheema was born in 1966 to Sikh Punjabi parents who emigrated from India to Great Britain in the 1960s. She grew up in Yorkshire, and attended City of Leeds School before reading law at King's College London.

== Legal career ==
Called to the bar at Gray's Inn in 1989, Cheema-Grubb, in 2006, became the first Asian woman to be appointed a Junior Treasury Counsel. In 2007, she was appointed to sit as a recorder.

In 2013, Cheema-Grubb took silk (QC) serving as Senior Treasury Counsel before receiving authorisation to sit as a deputy High Court judge. She chaired an Advocacy Training Council working group which produced the report "Raising the Bar: The Handling of Vulnerable Witnesses, Victims and Defendants in Court".

Cheema-Grubb successfully acted for the prosecution against retired Anglican bishop Peter Ball for sexual abuse and against barrister and recorder Constance Briscoe for perverting the course of justice.

=== Judiciary ===
Appointed as a High Court judge on 22 October 2015, Cheema-Grubb was sworn in to the Queen's Bench on 25 November 2015, receiving the customary accolade of the realm as DBE.

Cheema-Grubb is one of a small number of High Court judges who are selected to preside over trials involving terrorism offences.

In 2025, Cheema-Grubb was judge at the trial of Nathan Gill, the former leader of Reform UK in Wales, whom she sentenced to 10-and-a-half years for taking pro-Russia bribes.

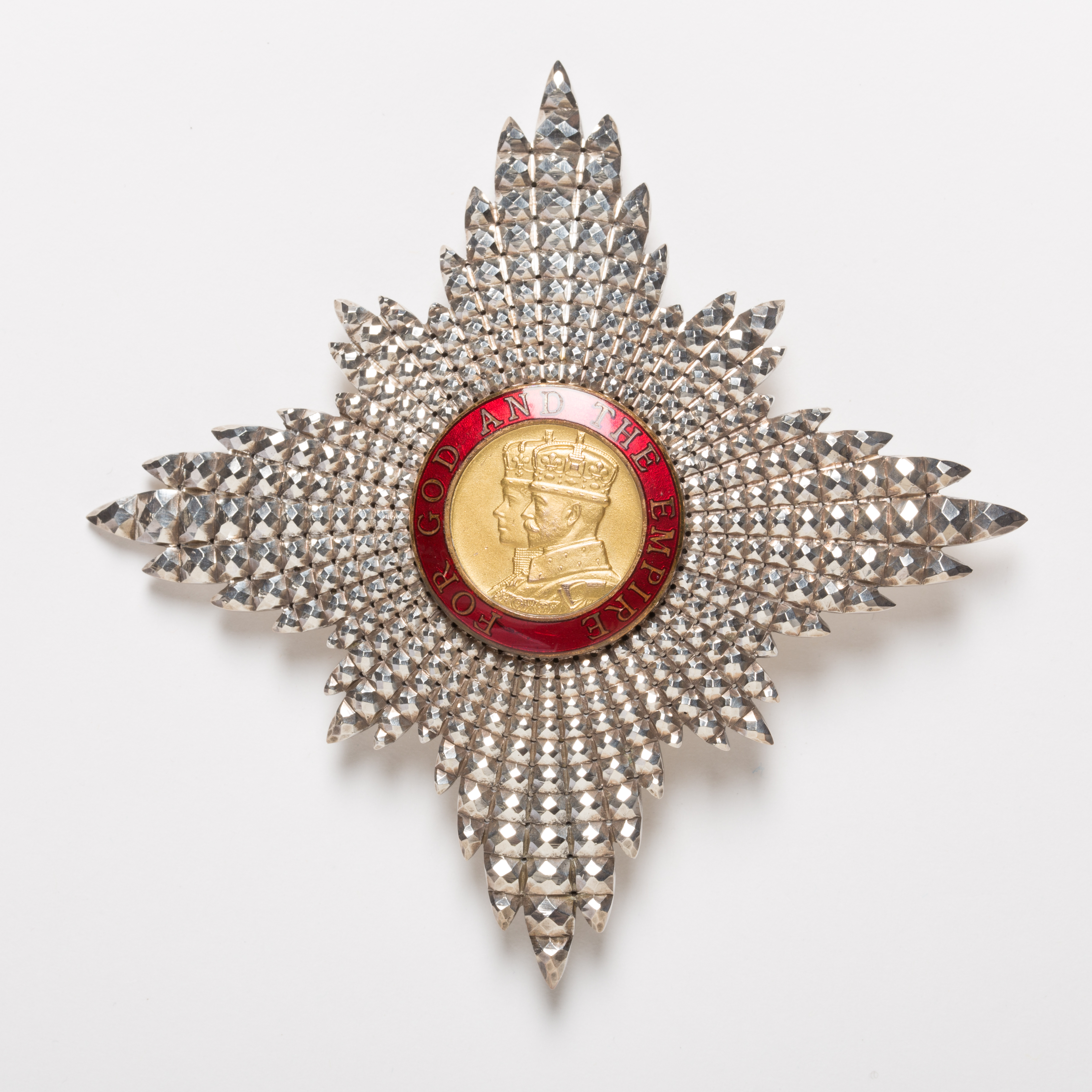
DBE insignia

In 2026, following a ruling by the Court of Appeal that contempt proceedings against defence barrister Rajiv Menon KC had been initiated using the wrong procedure, the president of the King's Bench Division referred the matter for reconsideration under the statutory procedure governing contempt in the Crown Court. The application was assigned to Cheema-Grubb, who held that there was sufficient evidence to establish a prima facie case of contempt and that it was in the public interest for proceedings to be instituted. She directed that the allegations should proceed to a substantive hearing before her sitting as a judge of the Crown Court.

The hearing was originally scheduled to take place on 28 July 2026. However, on 24 July 2026, the High Court of England and Wales ruled that an appeal challenging the jurisdiction of the High Court to rule on contempt should be allowed to proceed, resulting in an adjournment of proceedings until such time as the appeal could be heard.

== Personal life ==
In 1990, she married Russell Grubb and they have three children. They are practising Christians.

== Notable cases ==
- 2017 Finsbury Park attack
- Daniel Khalife
- David Carrick (serial rapist)
- David Fuller
- Death of Harry Dunn
- Murder of Zara Aleena
- Murders of Anne Castle and William Bryan
- Prosper family murders
- Kingsbury High School stabbing
- Ahmed Ali Alid (Hartlepool terror attack 2023)
- 2024 Hong Kong trade office spy case（R v Yuen and Wai)
- 2025 Plot to attack Shrivenham Defence Academy
