= Harnam Singh Grewal =

Hong Kong hockey player and civil servant

Personal information
- Nationality: Canadian
- Born: 5 December 1937 (age 88) British Hong Kong

Sport
- Sport: Field hockey
- Club: Nav Bharat Club, Hong Kong

Harnam Singh Grewal (高禮和) CBE ED (born 5 December 1937) is a former Hong Kong hockey player and career civil servant. Growing up and living most of his life in Hong Kong, Grewal served in the Government of Hong Kong upon completing his university education. During his career, he held the posts of Commissioner of Customs and Excise, Secretary for Transport, and Secretary for the Civil Service. He retired to Canada in the 1990s.

== Heritage ==
Grewal's family originates from Punjab, India.

== Career with the Hong Kong government ==
Grewal initially taught at Queen's College, Hong Kong from 1962 to 1964. When the Government was recruiting administrative officers for the 1964 intake, he applied and was taken on. Grewal served in various posts over the years, including that of District Officer Taipo (1970–1973), Deputy Director of Urban Services (New Territories) (1976–1980), and Deputy Secretary for the Civil Service (1980–1984). He was appointed Commissioner of Customs and Excise in 1984, followed by his appointment as Secretary for Transport in 1986. He took on the portfolio of the Secretary for the Civil Service in early 1987 and held that position for just under three years. He retired in 1990.

== Olympian ==
Grewal was an Olympic field hockey player for Hong Kong during the 1964 Summer Olympics.

== Retirement ==
He retired to Canada at the end of 1990.

Political offices
Preceded by David Robert Ford	Secretary for the Civil Service; 1987 – 1990	Succeeded by Edward Barrie Wiggham
Government offices
Preceded by Douglas Arthur Jordan	Commissioner of Customs and Excise; 1984 – 1986	Succeeded by Patrick John Williamson
