= David Ford (civil servant) =

Hong Kong politician (1935–2017)

Sir David Ford KBE LVO

Governor of Hong Kong
- Acting
- In office 3 July 1992 – 9 July 1992
- Monarch: Elizabeth II
- Chief Secretary: Himself
- Preceded by: Sir David Wilson
- Succeeded by: Chris Patten

Chief Secretary of Hong Kong
- In office 12 February 1987 – 28 November 1993
- Monarch: Elizabeth II
- Governor: Sir David Wilson; Chris Patten
- Preceded by: Sir David Akers-Jones
- Succeeded by: Anson Chan

Secretary for the Civil Service
- In office August 1985 – December 1986
- Monarch: Elizabeth II
- Governor: Sir Edward Youde
- Preceded by: John Martin Rowlands
- Succeeded by: Harnam Singh Grewal

Personal details
- Born: 22 February 1935
- Died: 10 September 2017 (aged 82) London, England, United Kingdom
- Spouses: Elspbeth Anne Mucker (m. 1958; div. 1987) Gillian Petersen (m. 1987)
- Children: 4, including Mandy Ford
- Education: Royal College of Defence Studies
- Occupation: Army officer, civil servant

Sir David Robert Ford, KBE, LVO (Chinese: 霍德; 22 February 1935 – 10 September 2017) was the fifth and the last non-ethnic Chinese Chief Secretary of Hong Kong and Deputy Governor of Hong Kong from 1987 to 1993 and was Hong Kong Commissioner in London from 1980 to 1981 and again from 1994 until 1997.

== Biography ==
Ford was born on 22 February 1935 and educated at the Taunton School in southwest England. He joined the military service at 20 as a regular army officer in the Royal Artillery, serving in 17 different countries on five different continents. In his last five years of service, he served in Aden and Borneo with the Commando Brigade. During the Hong Kong 1967 Leftist riots, Ford was seconded to the Hong Kong government. The riots instigated by the local communists left 51 people dead.

Ford left the army in 1972 and began working in the Hong Kong government, holding a number of appointments as a senior civil servant . He became the Director of the Information Services Department in 1974 where he engaged in propaganda warfare with the communists in Hong Kong. He was Under Secretary in the Northern Ireland Office between 1977 and 1979 during the resurgence of the Irish Republican Army in the period known as The Troubles. Pro-Beijing newspapers believed Ford was an MI6 agent due to his portfolio.

Ford returned to Hong Kong in 1979 and studied at the Royal College of Defence Studies between 1980 and 1983 before he became Hong Kong Commissioner in London. He was the Secretary for the Civil Service from 1985 and 1986. He became the Chief Secretary of Hong Kong and Deputy Governor of Hong Kong in 1986, serving as the most senior civil servant with the highest position in the civil service. During this period, he initiated the planning for Hong Kong's new international airport at Chek Lap Kok in 1989. He was the acting Governor of Hong Kong for a week before Chris Patten reported for duty on 9 July 1992. He held the position until 1993 when he retired and took the position of Hong Kong Commissioner in London for the second time later in 1994.

Ford retired from public service in 1997, focusing on breeding rare cattle and sheep in Devon. He was a director of the Campaign to Protect Rural England between 2000 and 2003. In 2002, he became a non-executive director at PCCW Limited. From 2003 to May 2017, he was chairman of UK Broadband Limited, a subsidiary of PCCW. Later, UK Broadband was sold to Three UK in May 2017. He visited Hong Kong several times after his departure, attracting interest from the pro-Beijing media which speculated on his strategising with pan-democrat opposition and "meddling" in Hong Kong's internal affairs.

Ford died on 10 September 2017, at the age of 82. His wife, Lady Gillian Ford was a founder and subsequently patron of the Hong Kong Children's Cancer Foundation from 1987 to 1992.

== Personal life ==
In 1958, Ford married Elspeth Anne (née Muckart). Together they had four children; two sons and two daughters. Their marriage was dissolved in 1987, and the same year he married Gillian Petersen (née Monsarrat). One of his daughters is Mandy Ford, an Anglican priest who has been Dean of Bristol since 2020.

Government offices
Preceded by Nigel John Vale Watt	Director of Information Services; 1972–1975	Succeeded by Richard Lai Ming
Preceded by Denis Bray	Hong Kong Commissioner in London; 1980–1981	Succeeded by Sir Jack Cater
Preceded by Bernard Williams	Director of Housing; 1983–1984	Succeeded by Y. L. Pang
Preceded by Donald Liao	Secretary for Housing; 1985	Succeeded by John Rawling Todd
Preceded by John Martin Rowlands	Secretary for the Civil Service; 1985–1987	Succeeded by Harnam Singh Grewal
Preceded by Sir David Akers-Jones	Chief Secretary of Hong Kong; 1987–1993	Succeeded by Anson Chan
Preceded by John Francis Yaxley	Hong Kong Commissioner in London; 1994–1997	Succeeded by John Tsang Chun-wah; Director-General of the Hong Kong Economic and Trade Office, London
