= 2026 Kingsbury High School stabbing =

School stabbing in London, England

- Kingsbury High School stabbing
- Location: Kingsbury High School, Brent, London, England
- Date: 10 February 2026 c. 12:40 p.m. (GMT)
- Attack type: Stabbing; school stabbing; attempted murder
- Weapon: Knife
- Deaths: 0
- Injuries: 2
- Motive: Under investigation
- Accused: 13-year-old male
- Charges: Possession of a knife on school premises; Attempted murder (2 counts); Administering a Noxious Thing (1 count)

On 10 February 2026, two students were injured after being stabbed in the neck at Kingsbury High School in the London Borough of Brent in England. A 13-year-old suspect was arrested later that day. The two victims were taken to hospital in critical condition; both were "later described as stable and not in life‑threatening condition".

== Background ==
Kingsbury High School is a large two-site secondary school in Kingsbury, a district of Brent. The lower school site teaches Year 7 to Year 9, and the upper school site teaches Year 10 to Year 13. The attack took place at the lower school.

== Incident ==
At approximately 12:30 p.m., the suspect, whose identity is currently withheld, requested access to a first floor classroom. Once inside, he sprayed the face of the pupil who had opened the door with a noxious substance, before abruptly stabbing a 13-year-old in the neck and hands. Following this, the suspect fled the school, stabbing another 12-year-old pupil in the school yard. The substance that was sprayed was later stated to be insect repellent.

Armed police units arrived approximately 13 minutes later, and a manhunt around the local area was soon launched. Some child witnesses reported the student shouted "Allahu Akbar" during the attack. The critically injured victims were rushed to hospital. One of the victims had managed to pull the fire alarm as he was attacked, possibly saving more lives.

Around six hours later, 999 calls were made to the police from a nearby mosque reporting a child showing "distressing" behaviour. Upon arriving at the mosque, a link to the stabbing was made, and the 13-year-old was arrested on suspicion of attempted murder. Police stated they did not believe the suspect had a connection to the mosque.

=== Aftermath ===
Whilst recovering in hospital, the victim who had pulled the fire alarm during the attack was labelled as a "hero" during an official police statement on the incident.

== Investigation ==
Counter Terrorism Policing began leading the investigation, however it was later stated that officers were instead leaning towards a motive of a personal grievance. Over 40 eyewitnesses and CCTV footage began to be interviewed and investigated the day after the stabbing.

The mayor of London, Sadiq Khan, issued a statement via X stating "My thoughts are with the families, friends and wider Brent community following today’s appalling stabbings". Prime Minister Keir Starmer would later call the attack "appalling" whilst speaking in the House of Commons.

== Suspect ==
The Metropolitan Police have described the lead suspect as a 13-year-old male who was born in and is a legal resident of the United Kingdom. The suspect had attended the school in the past, but was not currently a pupil. He climbed over a fence to gain access to the school, and worn his former uniform as a disguise.

The Metropolitan Police have asked people to avoid speculation surrounding the motive for the attack. The suspect was officially charged on 12 February 2026 with: possession of a knife on school premises; one count of administering a noxious thing; and two counts of attempted murder. He appeared at Westminster Magistrates' Court later in the day, speaking only to confirm his name and date of birth. During the hearing, it was alleged that the suspect had recorded the attacks using his mobile phone which was positioned in his blazer. However, it was noted that no evidence that he had shared the footage was found.

The suspect appeared before Bobbie Cheema-Grubb at the Old Bailey on 27 February 2026. He once again spoke only to confirm his name and date of birth. On 13 July, the suspect pleaded not guilty. A trial lasting up to three weeks is scheduled to begin on 23 November.

== See also ==
- 2024 Southport stabbings
- Murder of Harvey Willgoose
- 2026 Tumbler Ridge shooting; deadly Canadian school shooting that occurred just a day later
