= Secretary for the Civil Service =

Position of the Hong Kong Government

Hong Kong Special Administrative Region Secretary for the Civil Service 公務員事務局局長
- Emblem of Hong Kong

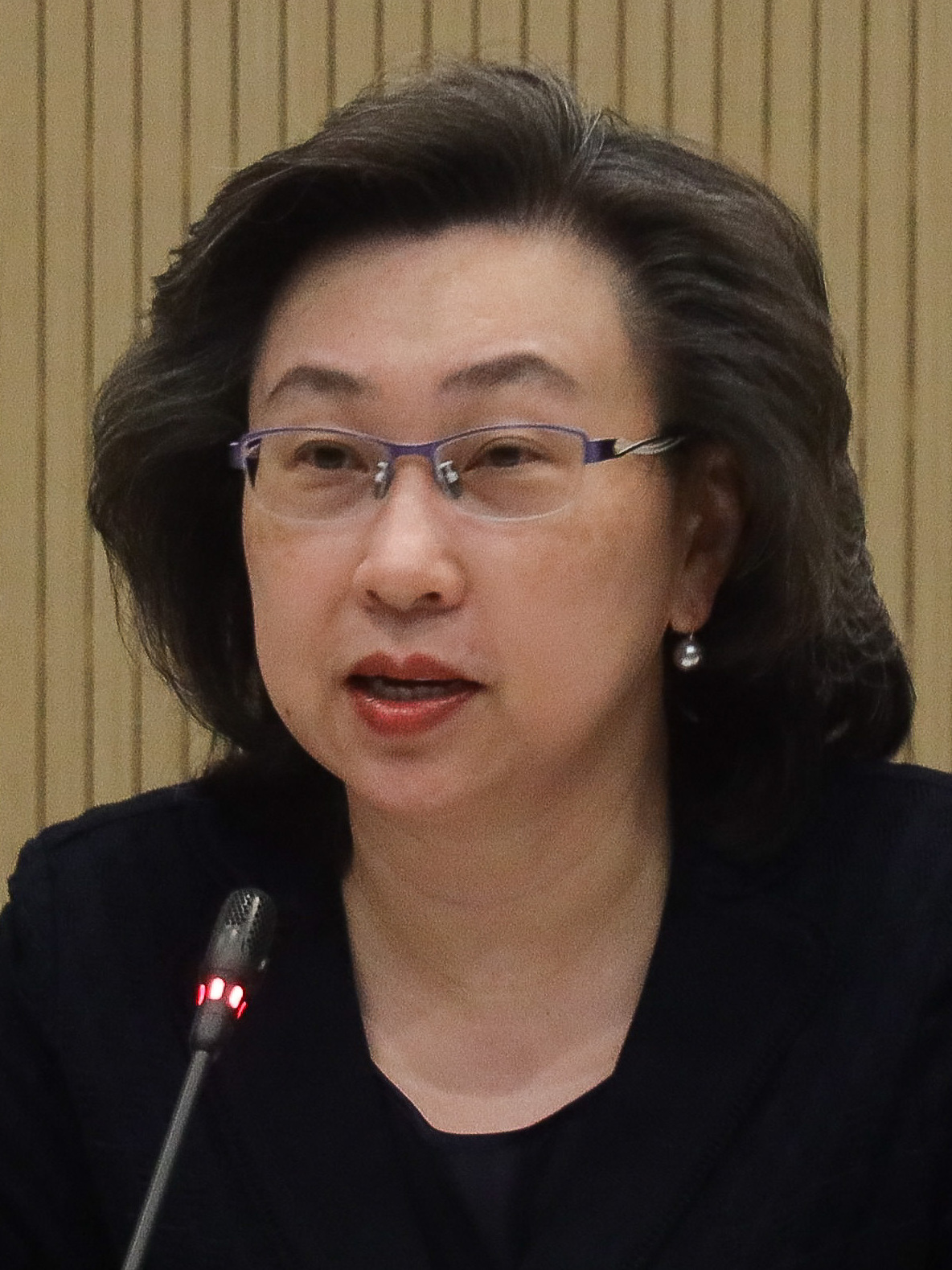
- Incumbent; Ingrid Yeung since 1 July 2022
- Civil Service Bureau
- Style: The Honourable
- Appointer: Central People's Government nomination by Chief Executive
- Inaugural holder: Lam Woon-kwong
- Formation: 1 July 1997
- Salary: HK$4,021,200 per annum
- Website: CSB

Secretary for the Civil Service
- Traditional Chinese: 公務員事務局局長
- Simplified Chinese: 公务员事务局局长
Transcriptions
Standard Mandarin
- Hanyu Pinyin: Gōngwùyuán Shìwù Jú Júzhǎng
Yue: Cantonese
- Yale Romanization: Gūng mouh yùhn sih mouh guhk guhk jéung
- Jyutping: Gung^{1} mou^{6} jyun^{4} si^{6} mou^{6} guk^{6} guk^{6} zoeng^{2}

The Secretary for the Civil Service is the head of the Civil Service Bureau in Hong Kong. Unlike other secretaries for bureaux, the Secretary for the Civil Service is filled by an administrative officer from the civil service, who may choose to return to the civil service when his term expires. Before Principal Officials Accountability System was introduced in 2002, it was a civil service position.

== List of office holders ==
=== Colonial period, 1973–1997 ===
No.	Portrait	Name	Term of office		Governor	Ref
1		Alan James Scott 施恪	June 1973	August 1977	Sir Murray MacLehose (1971–1982)	
2		R. G. B. Bridge 布立之	August 1977	March 1978	Sir Murray MacLehose (1971–1982)	
3		John Martin Rowlands 羅能士	March 1978	August 1985	Sir Murray MacLehose (1971–1982)	
3		John Martin Rowlands 羅能士	March 1978	August 1985	Sir Edward Youde (1982–1986)	
4		David Robert Ford 霍德	7 October 1985	December 1986	Sir Edward Youde (1982–1986)	
5		Harnam Singh Grewal 高禮和	9 February 1987	April 1990	Sir David Wilson (1987–1992)	
6		Edward Barrie Wiggham 屈珩	April 1990	April 1993	Sir David Wilson (1987–1992)	
6		Edward Barrie Wiggham 屈珩	April 1990	April 1993	Chris Patten (1992–1997)	
7		Anson Chan 陳方安生	19 April 1993	October 1993	Chris Patten (1992–1997)	
8		Michael Sze 施祖祥	1 February 1994	11 February 1996	Chris Patten (1992–1997)	
9		Lam Woon-kwong 林煥光	12 February 1996	30 June 1997	Chris Patten (1992–1997)	

=== After handover, 1997–present ===
Political party: Nonpartisan

No.	Portrait	Name	Term of office		Duration	Chief Executive	Term	Ref
1		Lam Woon-kwong 林煥光	1 July 1997	9 July 2000	3 years, 9 days	Tung Chee-hwa (1997–2005)	1	
2		Joseph Wong Wing-ping 王永平	1 August 2000	24 January 2006	5 years, 176 days	Tung Chee-hwa (1997–2005)	1	
2		Joseph Wong Wing-ping 王永平	1 August 2000	24 January 2006	5 years, 176 days	Tung Chee-hwa (1997–2005)	2	
2		Joseph Wong Wing-ping 王永平	1 August 2000	24 January 2006	5 years, 176 days	Donald Tsang (2005–2012)	2	
3		Denise Yue Chung-yee 俞宗怡	25 January 2006	30 June 2012	6 years, 157 days	Donald Tsang (2005–2012)	2	
3		Denise Yue Chung-yee 俞宗怡	25 January 2006	30 June 2012	6 years, 157 days	Donald Tsang (2005–2012)	3	
4		Paul Tang Kwok-wai 鄧國威	1 July 2012	21 July 2015	3 years, 20 days	Leung Chun-ying (2012–2017)	4	
5		Clement Cheung Wan-ching 張雲正	21 July 2015	30 June 2017	1 year, 344 days	Leung Chun-ying (2012–2017)	4	
6		Joshua Law Chi-kong 羅智光	1 July 2017	22 April 2020	2 years, 296 days	Carrie Lam (2017–2022)	5	
7		Patrick Nip Tak-kuen 聶德權	22 April 2020	30 June 2022	2 years, 69 days	Carrie Lam (2017–2022)	5	
8		Ingrid Yeung Ho Poi-yan 楊何蓓茵	1 July 2022	Incumbent	4 years, 96 days	John Lee (2022–present)	6	
