= Mandy Ford =

British Anglican priest (born 1961)

The Very Reverend Dr Mandy Ford
- Dean of Bristol
- Church: Church of England
- Diocese: Diocese of Bristol
- In office: October 2020 to present
- Predecessor: David Hoyle

Personal details
- Born: Amanda Kirstine Ford; 1961 (age 64–65) Wool, Dorset, England
- Denomination: Anglicanism
- Parents: Sir David Ford (father)
- Partner: Anne (cp. 2007)
- Education: Middlesex University; Open University; St Stephen's House, Oxford; University of Oxford; University of Nottingham

Amanda Kirstine Ford (known as Mandy; born 1961) is a British Anglican priest who has served as Dean of Bristol since 3 October 2020.

== Early life and education ==
Ford was born in 1961 in Wool, Dorset, England. Her father was Sir David Robert Ford, an army officer at the time of her birth who became a civil servant and rose to become Chief Secretary of Hong Kong. She was educated at Cranborne Chase School, an all-girls private boarding school in Wiltshire. She studied fine art at the Central School of Art, Middlesex University, graduating with a Bachelor of Arts (BA) degree in 1983. She was a self-employed artist from 1988 to 1992, and also a teacher at The Maynard School in Exeter from 1990 to 1996. Having studied with the Open University, she completed a Master of Education (MEd) or Master of Arts (MA) degree in 1997.

From 1998 to 2000, Ford trained for ordination at St Stephen's House, Oxford. She would later graduate from the University of Oxford with a Bachelor of Theology (BTh) degree in 2004. She has am MA degree and a Doctor of Philosophy (PhD) degree in ethics and biblical interpretation from the University of Nottingham: her doctoral thesis was titled "The self in the mirror of the Scriptures: the hermeneutics and ethics of Paul Ricoeur" and was submitted in 2012.

== Ordained ministry ==
Ford was ordained in the Church of England as a deacon in 2000 and as a priest in 2001. She served her curacy at the Parish of the Resurrection, Leicester from 2000 to 2005. As a curate, she worked with excluded children in Leicester. She then joined the Diocese of Leicester as vicar of Beaumont Leys, and in 2008 became Chair of the Fabric Advisory Committee of Leicester Cathedral.

She had been Canon Chancellor of Southwark Cathedral and Director of Ministerial Education in the Diocese of Southwark since 2014 to 2020. She was also Interim Director of the Ministry Division of the Church of England between 2018 and 2019.

In June 2020, it was announced that she would be the next Dean of Bristol Cathedral. She was installed as the 43rd Dean of Bristol on 3 October 2020: this made the Diocese of Bristol the first Church of England diocese to have women serving as both dean and diocesan bishop.

== Personal life ==
Ford has been in a same-sex civil partnership with Anne since 2007.

== Selected works ==
- Ford, Mandy (2019). God, Gender, Sex and Marriage. London: Jessica Kingsley Publishers. ISBN 978-1785924750.
