= Roy Tang =

Hong Kong Government official

Roy Tang Yun-kwong JP
- 鄧忍光

Commissioner of Customs and Excise
- In office 21 October 2021 – 21 October 2021
- Preceded by: Clement Cheung
- Succeeded by: Hermes Tang

Director of Broadcasting
- In office 15 September 2011 – 6 August 2015
- Preceded by: Franklin Wong
- Succeeded by: Leung Ka-wing

Personal details
- Born: 21 September 1963 (age 62)

Roy Tang Yun-kwong

Roy Tang
- Chinese: 鄧忍光
Transcriptions
Standard Mandarin
- Hanyu Pinyin: Deng Renguang
Yue: Cantonese
- Hong Kong Romanisation: Tang Yun-kwong

Roy Tang Yun-kwong (Chinese: 鄧忍光; pinyin: Deng Renguang) was a Hong Kong public servant. He served as the Director of Broadcasting at Radio Television Hong Kong from 2011-2015, and was the territory's twelfth Commissioner of Customs and Excise.

As Director of Broadcasting at Radio Television HK, Tang was involved in a number of controversies. His appointment was initially criticised by detractors because he did not have any previous broadcasting experience. He was suspected of political interference in 2012, when he proposed terminating the long running programme Legco Review which reported on Hong Kong's legislature, in 2013, when his criticism led to changes to an episode of the parody programme Headliner and when he objected to the promotion of an assistant director. Tang was appointed Commissioner of Customs and Excise in 2015, followed, in 2017, by his appointed as Permanent Secretary for Constitutional and Mainland Affairs, a role he served in until his retirement in 2022

== Early career ==
Tang first joined the Administrative Service for the Government of Hong Kong in 1987 and served in various capacities before being appointed Deputy Secretary for Labour and Welfare in 2010.

== Director of Broadcasting at Radio Television HK ==
On 9 September 2011, Tang was appointed by the Hong Kong government as the Director of Broadcasting, the head of Radio Television Hong Kong (RTHK). Tang's appointment took effect on September 15, 2011. Tang did not have previous broadcasting experience. This led to some suggestions of government intervention into freedom of the press and fear that he would interfere with their editorial independence.

After Tang took up his broadcasting post, he was criticised for politically interfering with the affairs of the RTHK. A survey conducted by the Democratic Party in 2013 revealed that over 40% of its respondents wished for Tang to step down from his position.

Tang dual role as chief editor of broadcasting at RTHK and an administrative officer in the government was also challenged.

=== Legco Review controversy ===
In 2012 in an internal meeting, Tang suggested terminating the 26-year-old Legco Review, a programme on Hong Kong's legislature. This caused controversy. Opponents of move suggested Tang was attempting to eliminate RTHK's ability to criticise controversial world issues and viewed Tang's actions as political interference. They aired their grievances through the mass media, creating groups and pages on social media like Facebook to draw attention to the issue. Some even made fun of Tang by nicknaming him "the last samurai of RTHK" or spoofing his photos. Proponents believed that RTHK's programmes were mostly used to mock the government officials and government policies in a one-sided manner. They claimed that Tang, as a government official, could balance the internal views in RTHK towards the government. Thus, they staged a rally and started campaigns to support Tang.

=== Headliner controversy ===
In 2013, Tang criticized the idea of using Adolf Hitler and the Nazis as characters in the parody programme Headliner. In the end, the producers scrapped the idea and used characters from the story Journey to the West instead. This led to criticism that Tang was using his authority to interfere with RTHK's editorial independence.

=== Sze Wing-yuen controversy ===
In 2013, Tang did not approve the promotion of Sze Wing-yuen, RTHK's assistant director of TV and corporate business. Some claimed that it was because Sze had defied Tang's orders, hindering the completion of Tang's "political mission".

== Later years ==
In 2015, Tang was appointed Commissioner of Customs and Excise. As with the RTHK, Tang was chosen for the role despite no previous customs experience.

This was followed, in 2017, by his appointed as Permanent Secretary for Constitutional and Mainland Affairs. Tang attracted criticism in 2018 when he was allowed back into the territory despite losing his Hong Kong ID card and mainland Chinese entry permit. Tang served as Permanent Secretary until his retirement in 2022
