= Erick Tsang =

Hong Kong government official

The Honourable Erick Tsang GBS IDSM JP
- 曾國衞
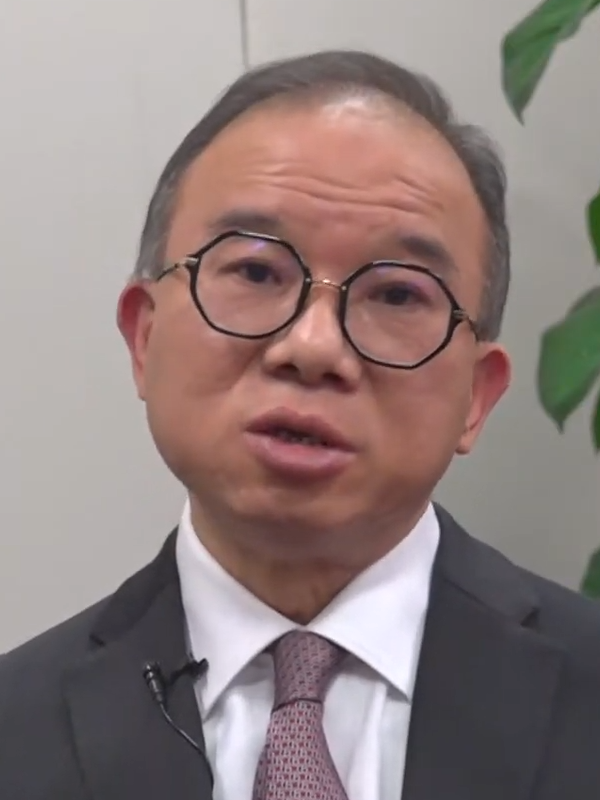

Secretary for Constitutional and Mainland Affairs
- In office 22 April 2020 – 27 January 2026
- Chief Executive: Carrie Lam; John Lee Ka-chiu
- Preceded by: Patrick Nip
- Succeeded by: Clement Woo (acting); Janice Tse

Director of Immigration
- In office 5 April 2016 – 22 April 2020
- Security Secretary: Lai Tung-kwok; John Lee Ka-chiu
- Preceded by: Eric Chan
- Succeeded by: Au Ka-wang

Personal details
- Born: 1 September 1963 (age 63) Hong Kong
- Education: New Asia College, CUHK (BSS)

Erick Tsang Kwok-wai
- Traditional Chinese: 曾國衞
- Simplified Chinese: 曾国衞
Transcriptions
Standard Mandarin
- Hanyu Pinyin: Zēng Guówèi
Yue: Cantonese
- Jyutping: zang1 gwok3 wai6

Erick Tsang Kwok-wai GBS IDSM JP (Chinese: 曾國衞; born 1 September 1963) is a Hong Kong politician, serving as Director of Immigration and later Secretary for Constitutional and Mainland Affairs, one of the principal officials of Hong Kong, since 2020. He oversaw the "patriots-only" elections which recorded historic low turnout, before resigning in 2026 citing health.

== Early life and career ==
Tsang was born in 1963 in British Hong Kong. He graduated from Buddhist Tai Hung College in 1980, and matriculated to New Asia College of the Chinese University of Hong Kong in 1982, graduating in 1986 with a bachelor's degree in journalism and communication.

Tsang joined the Immigration Department in 1987 as an Assistant Immigration Officer and rose through the ranks to become Principal Immigration Officer in 2009. He was Assistant Secretary for Security from 2003 to 2006. In 2012, he became Assistant Director of Immigration and then in 2014, Deputy Director of Immigration. In April 2016, he was appointed Director of Immigration. During the COVID-19 pandemic, he led a team and negotiated the return of Hong Kong passengers stranded on the Diamond Princess.

In an interview with the state media Bauhinia Magazine, a prominently positioned photograph of General Secretary of the Chinese Communist Party Xi Jinping was seen in his office. Tsang denied claims that this is attempted to show his loyalty towards Xi.

== Political career ==
In April 2020, the State Council of China appointed Tsang Secretary for Constitutional and Mainland Affairs, replacing Patrick Nip, days after the department had failed to reflect Beijing's controversially changed position on the status of the Liaison Office under Hong Kong's Basic Law. He is the first constitutional secretary that is not from the Administrative Officer team. His first major mission is to secure the passage of the National Anthem Bill, which was ferociously rejected by the pro-democracy members.

In August 2020, Tsang and ten other officials were sanctioned by the United States Department of the Treasury under Executive Order 13936 by President Trump for undermining Hong Kong's autonomy. Tsang said he felt "nothing at all. Tsang is also one of the 10 individuals named by the United States Department of State that materially contributed to the failure of the China to meet its obligations under the Sino–British Joint Declaration and Hong Kong's Basic Law.

In September 2020, when pro-democracy organizers planned to hold primaries for the 2020 legislative election, Tsang said that candidates could be in breach of the National Security Law. 47 pro-democracy leaders and activists were later arrested for subversion, known as Hong Kong 47. Tsang said that they had to pay the price for "crossing the red line" by organizing primaries for the Legislative Council.

=== Patriots-only elections ===
In 2021, Tsang said district councillors will be required to take an oath to pledge loyalty to the government under the National Security Law, adding that "You cannot say that you are patriotic but you do not love the leadership of the Chinese Communist Party or you do not respect it - this does not make sense." Opposition decried the new requirement as to crushing dissent. The bill was introduced in March 2021; Tsang stated that he would like it "passed as soon as possible."

As rumours grew that Beijing would introduce changes to the electoral system, Tsang affirmed that the government will fully cooperate when Beijing reaches a concrete decision. He led a full-scale publicity drive for the legislation that would only allow "patriots" to serve in the government. In less than two weeks, approximately HK $2.5 million was spent on creating some promotional videos. In addition, Tsang, along with Teresa Cheng, announced that the government would be looking into the possibility of banning blank ballots, a controversial move that legal scholar Johannes Chan questioned its legality. He also supported proposed proposal that would give the Secretary of Justice the power to suspend lawmakers.

The first "patriots-only" election was conducted in December 2021, with a record-low turnout of 30.2%. Prior to the election, Tsang threatened to sue The Wall Street Journal for illegally convincing people to cast blank ballots in an editorial. Nonetheless, he downplayed the turnout, arguing that people should not only look at figures to judge the election. He claimed that democracy in Hong Kong has taken "a quantum leap forward" since the handover, and the ultimate aim of attaining universal suffrage remains unchanged. Later as District Councils faced similar reform in 2023 with less democratically elected seats, Tsang said "anti-China" forces used "loopholes" to "swindle" votes during the 2019 district council elections; he rejected claims that the new changes mean democratic backsliding.

In October 2022, Tsang said that the policy of requiring only "patriots" to serve in the government may be expanded from the current policy of requiring civil servants, District Council members, as well as government schoolteachers to pledge loyalty to the government, to also include key employees in statutory bodies and public utilities in the future.

=== Later career ===
In July 2023, Tsang submitted legislation to ban insults to the flag of Hong Kong, including insults posted online, so that citizens could "consciously respect and love" the flag.

In January 2024, after lawmaker Paul Tse accused the government of prioritizing the complaints of mainland Chinese over local Hong Kong people, Tsang said that "views on Hong Kong, whether expressed on local or Mainland social media, carry equal weight" to the government.

Tsang also pushed for the same-sex relationship bill which ultimately failed due to massive pushback from the conservative wing. Ng Chau-pei, leader of the FTU, claimed Tsang had begged him to support the bill.

There were growing rumours that Tsang could leave his position after a front page report by Ming Pao in January 2026. The news was confirmed on 27 January 2026 after the Chinese government removed Tsang from the government. Later that day, Tsang said he resigned on health grounds. He said he had persistently high prostate-specific antigen, which is linked to the possibility of prostate cancer.

== Personal life ==
In October 2021, Tsang's wife Louise Ho Pui-shan, born 1968, became Commissioner of Customs and Excise of Hong Kong, after a three-decade career in the service, while her younger sister Doris Ho Pui-ling - Tsang's sister-in-law - has since January 2021 headed up the government's Policy Innovation and Co-ordination Office.

In June 2022, Tsang tested positive for COVID-19. Tsang's wife was deemed a close contact, and underwent mandatory quarantine. In July 2022, she was put in quarantine again due to being a close contact with an infected colleague.

According to a declaration of interests from 2023, Tsang owns property outside of Hong Kong.

On 25 November 2020, Tsang was spotted sleeping during Chief Executive Carrie Lam's annual Policy Address. At a press conference two days later, Tsang claimed that medication he took caused the drowsiness.

Government offices
Preceded by Eric Chan	Director of Immigration; 2016–2020	Succeeded by Au Ka-wang
Political offices
Preceded by Patrick Nip	Secretary for Constitutional and Mainland Affairs; 2020–present	Incumbent
Order of precedence
Previous: Kenneth Lau; Member of the Executive Council	Hong Kong order of precedence Member of the Executive Council	Next: Christopher Hui; Member of the Executive Council
