= Richard Yuen =

Former Hong Kong Government official

Richard Yuen Ming-fai GBS JP (traditional Chinese: 袁銘輝; simplified Chinese: 袁铭辉; pinyin: Yuán Mínghuī, born 6 March 1956), is the former Commissioner of Customs and Excise for the Customs and Excise Department of Hong Kong.

== Background ==
Richard Yuen joined the Administrative Service in August 1980. He has served in various bureaux and departments including the former Security Branch, the former Home Affairs Department, the former Urban Services Department, the former Home Affairs Branch, the former City and New Territories Administration, the former Councils and Administration Branch, the former Finance Branch, the former Chief Secretary's Office, and the former Economic Services Branch.

He was Deputy Secretary for Economic Services from October 1996 to August 1999; Private Secretary to the Chief Executive from August 1999 to October 2002; Deputy Director in the Chief Executive's Office from March 2003 to October 2003; and Commissioner of Insurance from December 2003 to July 2006. He was the Deputy Secretary for Health, Welfare and Food from January 2007 to June 2007. Yuen was succeeded by Clement Cheung for political reasons in September 2011.

Government offices
New office	Deputy Director of Chief Executive Office; March 2003 – October 2003	Office abolished
Civic offices
Preceded by Timothy Tong	Commissioner of Customs and Excise; 2007–2011	Succeeded by Clement Cheung
Order of precedence
Previous: Shiu Sin-por; Head of the Central Policy Unit	Hong Kong order of precedence Permanent Secretary for Food and Health (Health)	Succeeded by Joseph Lai; Permanent Secretary for Transport and Housing (Transport)
