= Murders of Anne Castle and William Bryan =

1993 double murder in London, England

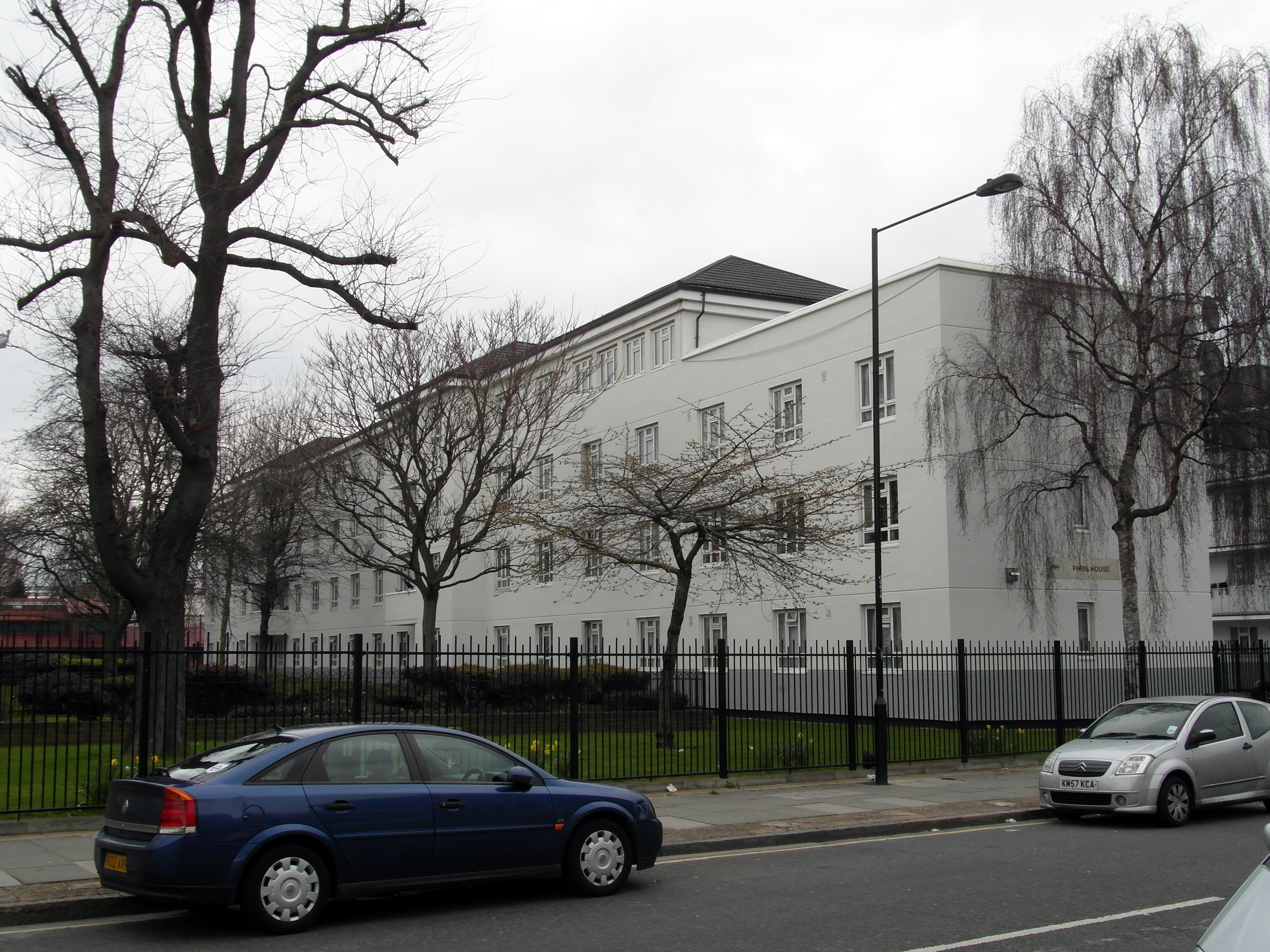
- Minerva Estate (pictured in 2012)
- Location: Minerva Estate, Bethnal Green, Tower Hamlets, London
- Date: 22 August 1993
- Deaths: 2
- Victims: Anne Castle (aged 74); William Bryan (aged 71)
- Perpetrator: Danville Neil
- Motive: Financial motive

In 1993, elderly siblings Anne Castle and William Bryan were attacked and killed during a home invasion in London, England. The crime went unsolved for nearly three decades, when new DNA evidence led to a conviction in 2022. Serial burglar Danville Neil was sentenced to life in prison for the killings.

== Background ==
William Bryan, known as 'Bill', was a veteran of World War II. He was invalided from the British Army in 1945. Anne Castle, known as 'Annie', had been widowed in 1987. She was a retired worker at the former Bethnal Green Hospital. She had five children, 13 grandchildren and 15 great-grandchildren. The siblings lived together in East London. They shared a flat on the Minerva Estate in Bethnal Green.

== Crime ==
On the night of 22 August 1993, neighbours heard screams which suggested a "prolonged burglary and attack". The next day the police found the bodies of the two pensioners at their home in Bethnal Green. Castle was slumped in an armchair and Bryan was lying on the floor. The robe from his dressing gown was used to tie his feet, and his binoculars strap was used to bind his hands.

Their home had been ransacked and valuables had been stolen, including jewellery. Two wedding rings and two diamond rings had been pulled from Castle's hand. The siblings had been beaten to death during the robbery. Investigators believed that Castle died from a heart attack while her brother died from suffocation. The killings had apparently occurred during a "botched burglary". The perpetrator had failed to find £4,000 in cash which had been stashed in the flat, some of which was hidden in socks.

The case went cold, the first development being a review in 2000 which led to DNA being obtained from the binocular strap. The forensic technology at the time was not advanced enough for a positive identification. The case was covered in a Series 8 episode of the television programme Most Evil Killers. New DNA techniques led to charges being brought in 2022.

== Trial ==
On 1 October 2020 police officers carried out a search warrant at the Lewisham home of Danville Neil and he was arrested. He denied all charges. Neil's DNA was found on a strap used to tie Bryan's hands. Neil was a serial burglar who had been convicted for 15 burglaries between 1973 and 1998. He had been jailed for two violent burglaries and released on licence in August 1992. Neil had served for offences committed between June and August 1984. His DNA was on the national database due to his prior convictions. The defence argued that the DNA had been transferred to the binoculars at a car boot sale where they had hypothetically been bought.

Neil was convicted of the murder and manslaughter in the case, and in November 2022 he was sentenced to life in prison with a minimum term of 32 years. Justice Bobbie Cheema-Grubb said in her ruling: "you dodged justice for nearly 30 years, now justice has caught up with you". In 2024, his appeal against his conviction was rejected.
