= Hong Kong Customs and Excise Department =

Department of Government

- 香港海關

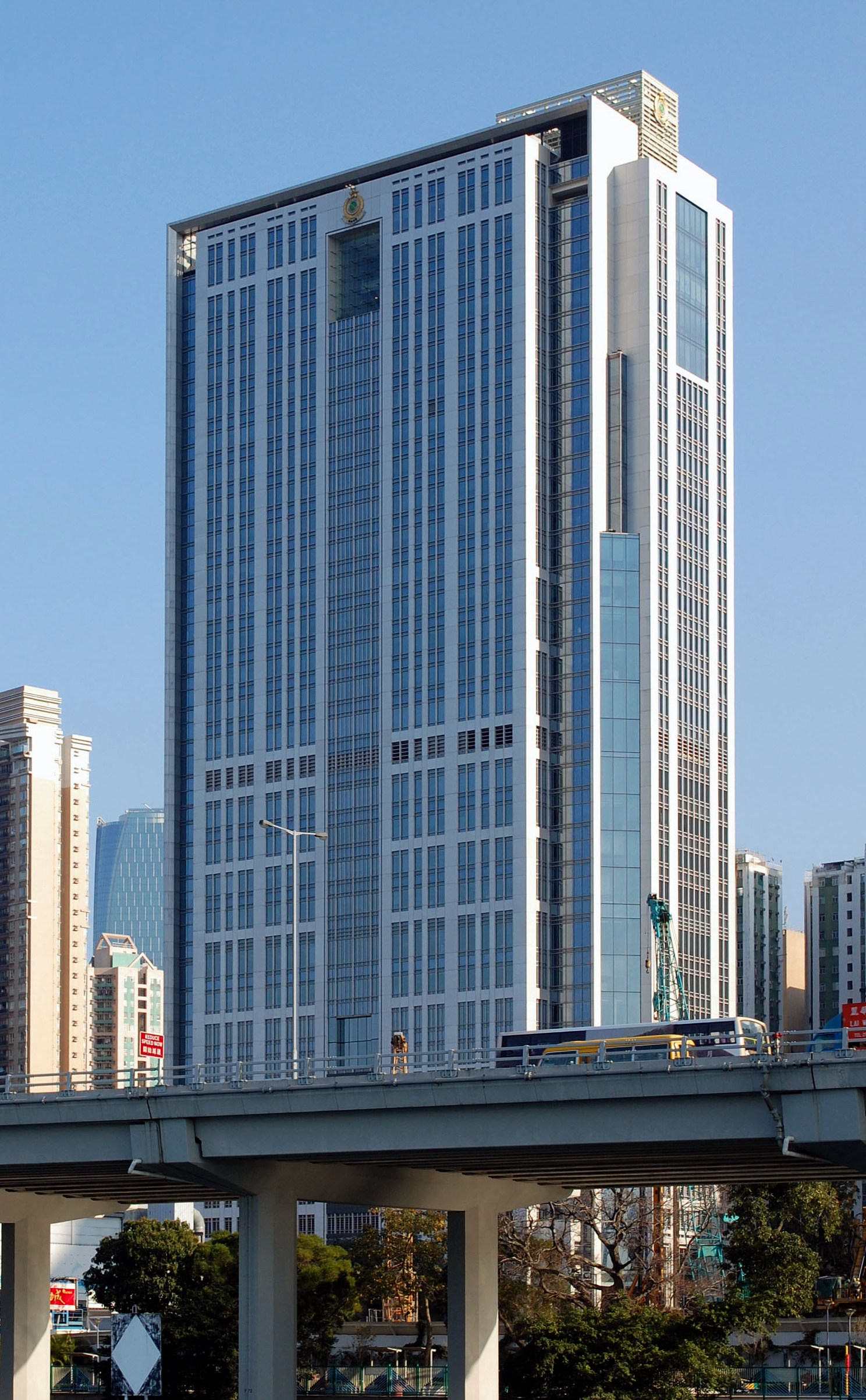
- Customs Headquarters Building

Agency overview
- Formed: 1909; 117 years ago
- Superseding agency: Hong Kong Customs
- Jurisdiction: Hong Kong
- Headquarters: 222 Java Road, North Point
- Employees: 7,387 (January 2019)
- Annual budget: HK$4,426.3 million (2018–19)
- Agency executive: Louise Ho, Commissioner of Customs and Excise
- Parent agency: Security Bureau
- Website: customs.gov.hk

Hong Kong Customs and Excise Department
- Traditional Chinese: 香港海關
- Simplified Chinese: 香港海关
Transcriptions
Standard Mandarin
- Hanyu Pinyin: Xiānggǎng hǎiguān
Yue: Cantonese
- Yale Romanization: Hēung góng hói gwāan
- Jyutping: Hoeng^{1} gong^{2} hoi^{2} gwaan^{1}

The Hong Kong Customs and Excise Department (C&ED; commonly known as the Hong Kong Customs) is the customs service of the Hong Kong Special Administrative Region. The agency was established to protect Hong Kong from smuggling, ensure the collection of duties on taxable goods, detect and prevent drug trafficking and abuse, safeguard intellectual property rights, protect consumer interests, facilitate legitimate business and uphold Hong Kong's trade reputation, regulate money service operators and dealers in precious metals and stones, and combat money laundering and terrorist financing.

The C&ED is an active member of the World Customs Organization (WCO) and the Asia Pacific Economic Cooperation (APEC). It exchanges intelligence and works closely with overseas Customs administrations and law enforcement agencies.

== History ==
Badge of Customs and Excise Department before 1997

Flag of Customs and Excise Department before 1997

Hong Kong Customs, originally known as the Preventive Service, was founded in 1909. Initially it was responsible to collect the newly imposed duties on liquor. As commodities became subject to duties, the scope of the Preventive Service broadened to include tobacco and hydrocarbon oil, as well as duties related to the government opium monopoly. During times of war, the service prevented the export of precious metals and other commodities to the enemies of the United Kingdom and its allies. In 1963, with the passage of the Preventive Service Ordinance, the service gained the legal status to make regulations on its discipline, functions, powers and terms of service. In 1977, it was renamed the Hong Kong Customs and Excise Service. On 1 August 1982, The Hong Kong Customs and Excise Department became independent from the Trade and Industry Department.

In the early 2000s, the Computer Forensic Laboratory, the Computer Analysis and Response Team, and the Anti-Internet Piracy Investigation Team were established to tackle cybercrime. In 2013, the Electronic Crime Investigation Centre was set up within the department.

In May 2025, the C&ED announced that it will start replacement the uniforms with new ones as those in use were issued for 30 years.

== Organisation ==
The department is headed by the Commissioner of Customs and Excise. From 21 October 2021, this position is held by Louise Ho Pui-shan, its first female occupant and wife of Erick Tsang, Hong Kong's Secretary for Constitutional and Mainland Affairs.

As at 1 April 2020, the department has an establishment of 7,317 posts, of which nine are directorate officers, 6,142 are members of the Customs and Excise Service, 493 are Trade Controls Officers and 673 are staff of the General and Common Grades.

There are five branches:

=== Administration and Human Resource Development Branch ===
The Administration and Human Resource Development Branch is responsible for matters concerning the overall staff management of the Customs and Excise Service; departmental administration; financial management; staff training; and the housekeeping of the Office of Service Administration, the Office of Departmental Administration, the Office of Financial Administration, the Office of Prosecution and Management Support, the Office of Training and Development and the Complaints Investigation Group.

=== Boundary and Ports Branch ===
The Boundary and Ports Branch is responsible for matters relating to import and export controls under the purview of the Security Bureau and the housekeeping of the Airport Command, the Cross-boundary Bridge Command, the Land Boundary Command, the Rail and Ferry Command, and the Ports and Maritime Command.

=== Excise and Strategic Support Branch ===
The Excise and Strategic Support Branch is responsible for matters relating to dutiable commodities under the purview of the Financial Services and the Treasury Bureau; taking forward the Hong Kong Authorized Economic Operator Programme and implementation of Mutual Recognition Arrangements with partner customs administrations; international customs liaison and cooperation; project planning and equipment procurement; information technology development; operation of the Trade Single Window and the housekeeping of the Office of Dutiable Commodities Administration, the Office of Supply Chain Security Management, the Office of Customs Affairs and Co-operation, the Office of Project Planning and Development, the Office of Information Technology, the Office of Trade Single Window Operation and the Information Unit.

=== Intelligence and Investigation Branch ===
The Intelligence and Investigation Branch is responsible for matters relating to narcotic drugs and anti- smuggling enforcement under the schedule of the Security Bureau and issues relating to intellectual property under the purview of the Commerce and Economic Development Bureau; the formulation of policies and strategies regarding the application of intelligence and risk management in Customs operations; and the housekeeping of the Customs Drug Investigation Bureau, the Intellectual Property Investigation Bureau, the Intelligence Bureau, the Revenue Crimes Investigation Bureau and the Syndicate Crimes Investigation Bureau.

=== Trade Controls Branch ===
The Trade Controls Branch is responsible for trade controls and consumer protection matters under the schedule of the Commerce and Economic Development Bureau and supervision of MSOs under the schedule of the Financial Services and the Treasury Bureau. It comprises the CEPA and Trade Inspection Bureau, the Consumer Protection Bureau, the Trade Descriptions Investigation Bureau, the Trade Declaration and Systems Bureau, the Trade Investigation Bureau and the Money Service Supervision Bureau.

=== Office of Quality Management and Internal Audit Division ===
Under the direct charge of the Deputy Commissioner are the Office of Quality Management and the Internal Audit Division. The Office of Quality Management and the Internal Audit Division are responsible for conducting management reviews and money-related examinations respectively, with a view to enhancing the system integrity, efficiency and effectiveness, service quality and performance standard of the department.

=== Ranks ===
As with all of the HK Disciplined Services, British-pattern ranks and insignia continue to be utilised, the only change being the exchange of the St. Edward's Crown for the Bauhinia flower crest post-1997.

==== Customs and Excise Service ====
- Commissioner Grade
  - Commissioner (similar insignia to a UK General)
  - Deputy Commissioner (similar insignia to a UK Lieutenant-General)
  - Assistant Commissioner (similar insignia to a UK Major-General)
- Superintendent Grade
  - Chief Superintendent (similar insignia to a UK Colonel)
  - Senior Superintendent (similar insignia to a UK Lieutenant-Colonel)
  - Superintendent (similar insignia to a UK Major)
  - Assistant Superintendent (similar insignia to a UK Captain)
- Inspectorate Grade
  - Senior Inspector (similar insignia to a UK Lieutenant with a bar beneath)
  - Inspector (similar insignia to a UK Lieutenant)
  - Probationary Inspector (similar insignia to a UK Second Lieutenant)
- Customs Officer Grade
  - Chief Customs Officer (Wreathed fouled anchor)
  - Senior Customs Officer (Three chevrons)
  - Customs Officer (ID number)

==== Trade Controls Officer Grade ====
- Head Of Trade Controls / Senior Principal Trade Controls Officer
- Principal Trade Controls Officer
- Chief Trade Controls Officer
- Senior Trade Controls Officer
- Trade Controls Officer
- Assistant Trade Controls Officer

=== Crest ===
The current crest of the force was adopted in 1997 to replace most of the colonial symbols:

- St Edward's Crown replaced with Bauhinia
- Laurel wreath is added to replace the colonial Brunswick star
- Motto changed from "Customs Hong Kong to Hong Kong Customs and Excise 香港海關
- Badge theme added with key and sword to replace the words "香港海關"

== Duties ==
=== Protection of revenue ===
There are no tariffs on goods entering Hong Kong, but excise duties are charged on four groups of commodities: hydrocarbon oil, liquor, methyl alcohol and tobacco. The duties apply equally to imported commodities and those manufactured locally for domestic consumption.

In 2003, the C&ED collected $6,484 million excise duty. Under the Dutiable Commodities Ordinance, the C&ED controls breweries, distilleries, tobacco factories, oil installations, ship and aircraft duty-free stores, and industrial and commercial establishments dealing with dutiable commodities; and supervises licensed, general bonded and public bonded warehouses.

Licences are issued to those who import, export, manufacture or store dutiable commodities. The C&ED also assesses the First Registration Tax of vehicles under the Motor Vehicle (First Registration Tax) Ordinance. The Anti-illicit Cigarette Investigation Division is specially tasked to detect syndicated smuggling, distribution and peddling of dutiable cigarettes. The Diesel Oil Enforcement Division focuses its efforts on detecting the smuggling and misuse of illicit fuels.

=== Prevention and detection of smuggling ===
The C&ED prevents and detects smuggling activities under the Import and Export Ordinance and enforces the licensing controls on prohibited articles by inspecting cargoes imported and exported by air, sea and land; processing passengers and their baggage at entry /exit points; and searching aircraft, vessels and vehicles entering and leaving Hong Kong. The Joint Police/Customs Anti-Smuggling Task Force is dedicated to combating smuggling activities by sea. The Control Points Investigation Division is tasked to strengthen the intelligence collection capability at the land boundary and suppress the cross-boundary smuggling activities.

The smuggling of frozen meat to mainland China, using barges and powerful speedboats off the west coast of Hong Kong, remains a serious problem, with an estimated 600 tonnes being transshipped every day. Despite frequent operations, the department is able to intercept only a fraction - a total of 1,050 tonnes in 2019.

=== Border control points ===
- Man Kam To – customs point handling autos and lorries; 4-lane bridge across Shenzhen River
- Sha Tau Kok – customs point handling autos and lorries
- Lok Ma Chau – large customs point handling auto and lorries; multi-lane bridge across Shenzhen
- Lo Wu – located at the Lo Wu MTR station
- Hong Kong China Ferry Terminal, Tsim Sha Tsui
- Hong Kong–Macau Ferry Terminal
- Hong Kong International Airport
- Hong Kong West Kowloon Station
- Hong Kong–Zhuhai–Macau Bridge
- Heung Yuen Wai Control Point

=== Trade controls and consumer protection ===
The C&ED safeguards the certification and licensing systems which are of vital importance to Hong Kong's trading integrity. The department deters and investigates offences of origin fraud, circumvention of textiles licensing and quota control. It also investigates offences of import and export of strateg commodities and other prohibited articles not under and in accordance with a licence.

The department carries out cargo examination at control points, factory inspections, factory audit checks and consignment checks. It is also the department's enforcement strategy to administer a monetary reward scheme to encourage the supply of information on textile origin fraud.

The department is a member of the Hong Kong Compliance Office set up to assist the Central People's Government in implementing the Chemical Weapons Convention in Hong Kong. The department enforces licensing control on rice and consumer protection legislation relating to weights and measures, markings on fineness of precious metals, and safety of toys, children's products and consumer goods. The department also verifies import and export declarations to ensure accurate trade statistics and assesses and collects declaration charges and the clothing industry training levy.

In 2002/03, the department collected $848 million in declaration charges and $19.9 million in clothing industry training levies.

=== Intellectual property rights protection ===
The C&ED has the mission to defend the interests of intellectual property rights owners and legitimate traders through staunch enforcement of the Copyright Ordinance, the Trade Descriptions Ordinance and the Prevention of Copyright Piracy Ordinance.

The department investigates and prosecutes copyright offences relating to literary, dramatic, musical and artistic works, sound recordings, cinematographic films, broadcasts and other published works under the Copyright Ordinance. It also takes enforcement action against commercial goods with forged trademark or false label under the Trade Descriptions Ordinance.

At the manufacture level, the Prevention of Copyright Piracy Ordinance requires local optical disc and stamper manufacturers to obtain licences from the department and mark on all their products specific identification codes. The Import and Export Ordinance imposes licensing controls on the import and export of optical disc mastering and replication equipment. A 147-strong Special Task Force has also been playing an important role in combating copyright piracy, and serves as a mobile brigade to reinforce the suppression of other customs-related crimes.

=== Customs cooperation ===
The C&ED is an active member of the World Customs Organization (WCO) and Asia Pacific Economic Cooperation (APEC). It exchanges intelligence and works closely with overseas customs administrations and law enforcement agencies. The department has also entered bilateral Cooperative Arrangements with other customs authorities on administrative assistance. At the working level, the department and the Mainland customs have each established designated liaison officers to facilitate the exchange of intelligence through direct telephone hotlines.

== Order of precedence ==
| Preceded by Independent Commission Against Corruption | Customs and Excise Department (Hong Kong) | Succeeded by Immigration Department (Hong Kong) |
