= John Francis Yaxley =

British colonial civil servant (born 1938)

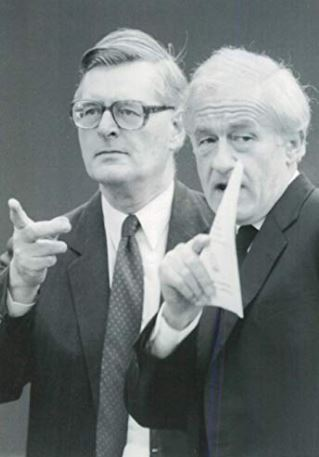
Yaxley (left) in 1991 with Governor David Wilson

John Francis Yaxley CBE JP (born 13 November 1938 in Birmingham, England) is a former civil servant in the UK Colonial Office.

After beginning his career in the Pacific Islands, Yaxley occupied a number of senior roles with the administration of British Hong Kong, which culminated in his appointment as Hong Kong Commissioner in London.

== Early life ==
Yaxley studied at Durham University. He belonged to Hatfield College. After graduating with a degree in Geography he completed two years of national service in the Royal Army Educational Corps, being appointed 2nd Lieutenant (on probation) 25 August 1958. He joined the Overseas Civil Service in 1961.

== Career ==
Yaxley served in the New Hebrides (now Vanuatu) and the British Solomon Islands Protectorate (now Solomon Islands). He carried out the first census of the New Hebrides with Norma MacArthur in 1967, and subsequently reported on it.

=== Hong Kong ===
Yaxley first moved to colonial Hong Kong in 1977, where he served in various posts. By 1984 he was Acting Secretary for Trade and Industry. He held the office of Deputy Financial Secretary (and was briefly Acting Financial Secretary) to the Treasury Branch from 1987 to 1989. From 1989 to 1993 he was based in London as the Commissioner for the Hong Kong Government Office. In 1990 Yaxley, writing to The Times, defended the actions of the Hong Kong government in its handling of Vietnamese boat people refugee cases, pointing out that all refugee claimants were granted legal aid in their cases against removal and granted the writ of habeas corpus.

He was appointed a Commander of the Order of the British Empire (CBE) in the 1990 Queen's Birthday Honours.

== Honours ==
- Commander of the Most Excellent Order of the British Empire (CBE) – 1990

Government offices
Preceded by Selwyn Alleyne	Hong Kong Commissioner in London; 1989–1994	Succeeded by David Ford
