= Joshua Law =

Hong Kong government official

Joshua Law Chi-kong GBS, JP
- 羅智光
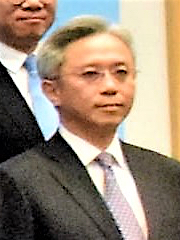

Secretary for the Civil Service
- In office 1 July 2017 – 22 April 2020
- Chief Executive: Carrie Lam
- Preceded by: Clement Cheung
- Succeeded by: Patrick Nip

Permanent Secretary for Security
- In office 25 July 2012 – 30 June 2017
- Preceded by: Chang King-yiu
- Succeeded by: Marion Lai Chan Chi-kuen

Permanent Secretary for Constitutional and Mainland Affairs
- In office 16 July 2007 – 24 July 2012
- Preceded by: Cherry Tse Ling Kit-ching (Permanent Secretary for Constitutional Affairs)
- Succeeded by: Chang King-yiu

Personal details
- Born: May 22, 1957 (age 68) Hong Kong
- Education: Diocesan Boys' School
- Alma mater: St Peter's College, Oxford

Joshua Law Chi-kong (Chinese: 羅智光; born 1957) is a Hong Kong government official. He was the Secretary for the Civil Service from July 2017 to April 2020.

He graduated from St Peter's College, Oxford University where he read PPE. He joined the Administrative Service in September 1980. He served in many bureaux and departments, such as Urban Services Department, Office of the Unofficial Members of the Executive and Legislative Councils, the City and New Territories Administration. He also worked at the Hong Kong Economic and Trade Office in New York, the Lands and Works Branch, the Works Branch, the Constitutional Affairs Branch, the Civil Service Branch, the Education and Manpower Branch and the Chief Executive's Office.

He was appointed Director-General of Trade, later renamed Director-General of Trade and Industry, from August 1999 to September 2002, followed by the positions of the permanent representative to the World Trade Organization from September 2002 to August 2004, and Permanent Secretary for the Environment, Transport and Works (Transport) from August 2004 to July 2007. He rose to his present rank of Administrative Officer Staff Grade A1 in September 2005. Law was also Permanent Secretary for Constitutional and Mainland Affairs since July 2007. From July 2012, he was appointed Permanent Secretary for Security.

In July 2017, he was appointed to Secretary for the Civil Service by Chief Executive Carrie Lam and served until a cabinet reshuffle in April 2020.

Political offices
Preceded by Clement Cheung	Secretary for the Civil Service; 2017–2020	Succeeded by Patrick Nip
