= Louise Ho =

Hong Kong government officer

Louise Ho CMSM
- 何珮珊
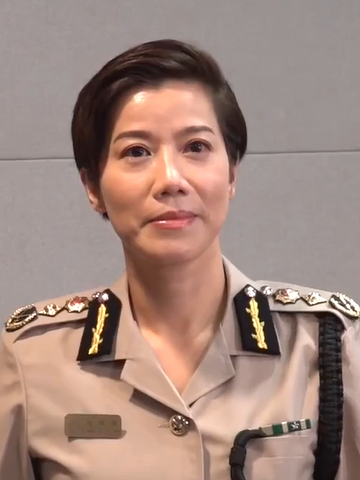

Commissioner of Customs and Excise
- In office 21 October 2021 – 31 December 2024
- Preceded by: Hermes Tang
- Succeeded by: Chan Tsz Tat

Personal details
- Born: 31 December 1967 (age 58) British Hong Kong
- Spouse: Erick Tsang (m. 2007)
- Education: University of Hong Kong (MPA)

Louise Ho Pui-shan CMSM (Chinese: 何珮珊, born 31 December 1967) is a Hong Kong retired civil servant and principal official who served as Commissioner of Customs and Excise from 2021 to 2024, the first woman to hold that post.

== Early years ==
Ho was born on 31 December 1967, and studied in Ying Wa Girls' School, before graduating from the University of Hong Kong with Master of Public Administration.

== Government career ==
Ho joined the Customs and Excise Department in February 1991 as Inspector of Customs and Excise in February 1991, and was chosen as the best recruit at the passing out parade from Customs And Excise Training School. Ho was promoted to Superintendent in 2010, and later in 2013 to Senior Superintendent to handle parallel trading. She was awarded with Meritorious Service Medals (Chinese: 榮譽獎章) and directly promoted to Assistant Commissioner of Customs and Excise in 2017, skipping the Chief Superintendent rank, and was further promoted to Deputy Commissioner two years later.

"On the surface, it is a simple matter of smuggling lobsters, but these activities undermine our country's trade restrictions against Australia. Stopping lobster smuggling is a very important part of protecting national security, so we will pursue it diligently."

— Louise Ho told reporters during inaugural press conference

On 21 October 2021, Louise Ho was appointed as the first Commissioner of Customs and Excise, and was inaugurated with the national emblem of China after the amendment to National Flag and National Emblem Ordinance was passed. She told reporters after inauguration ceremony that smuggling lobsters from Hong Kong to China will undermine Chinese trade restrictions against Australia, and endanger the national security, hence the customs has intensified the crackdown on so. As the Chinese Government has been claiming the ban on Australian lobsters was over fears of elevated traces of minerals and metals since October 2020, comments from Ho were the first official remarks that suggest the targeting of Australian lobsters was motivated by political interests, not health or contamination fears. Australian Trade Minister Dan Tehan, as a result, asked Beijing whether Australia was economically sanctioned. Ho later insisted food security is part of national security, argued that her comments were misinterpreted and the authorities will not tolerate so.

== Family ==
Louise Ho, who was Assistant Superintendent in Customs Department at that time, met Chief Immigration Officer Erick Tsang at work. The duo got married while Tsang was in posting at Office of the Hong Kong Government in Beijing, and finally registered their marriage in 2007. Tsang and Ho did not go on honeymoon, and had no children because of work. They are the first and so far the only pair of couples to serve simultaneously as "principal officials" of the special administrative region.

== Honour ==
- C.M.S.M. (1 July 2017)

Government offices
Preceded by Hermes Tang	Commissioner of Customs and Excise; 2021 – 2024	Succeeded by Chan Tsz Tat
