= Civil Service Bureau =

Bureau of the Hong Kong Government

- 公務員事務局
- Emblem of the Hong Kong SAR

Agency overview
- Formed: 1973
- Headquarters: 9/F, West Wing, Central Government Offices, 2 Tim Mei Avenue, Tamar, Hong Kong
- Minister responsible: Ingrid Yeung Ho Poi-yan, Secretary for the Civil Service
- Agency executive: Clement Leung, Permanent Secretary for the Civil Service; (etc.)
- Parent agency: Chief Secretary for Administration
- Child agencies: (etc.)
- Website: www.csb.gov.hk

Civil Service Bureau
- Traditional Chinese: 公務員事務局
- Simplified Chinese: 公务员事务局
Transcriptions
Standard Mandarin
- Hanyu Pinyin: Gōngwùyuán Shìwù Jú
Yue: Cantonese
- Yale Romanization: Gūng mouh yùhn sih mouh guhk
- Jyutping: Gung^{1} mou^{6} jyun^{4} si^{6} mou^{6} guk^{6}

The Civil Service Bureau (CSB) is a policy bureau under the Government Secretariat of the Government of Hong Kong and is responsible for the formulation and implementation of policies on the management of the Hong Kong Civil Service.

The Civil Service Bureau (CSB) is led by the Secretary for the Civil Service and has approximately 600 staff.

The CSB absorbed the Official Languages Agency (from 1 July 2003) and the Civil Service Training and Development Institute (from 1 April 2004).

On 15 January 2021, the CSB announced that civil servants must either sign an oath or a declaration to pledge loyalty to the government. In response, Leung Chau-ting, chairman of the Hong Kong Federation of Civil Service Unions, said that the requirements were too vague and that the requirement would give the government power to discipline civil servants.

In February 2021, the CSB announced that they will build both a temporary and permanent academy to teach civil servants about national affairs and the national security law.

In July 2022, figures were released, showing the CSB had the highest amount of employee resignations since the 1997 handover across multiple pay levels, in addition to declining applications for open positions.

In August 2022, the CSB said it would take more measures against misbehaving civil servants, after civil servants represented about a third of all fired government employees. Additionally, 70 others were fired after not signing an oath to pledge loyalty to the government.

In October 2022, Ingrid Yeung, head of the CSB, said that they would remove the requirement of "political neutrality" as one of the six core values in the Civil Service Code, a value which previously allowed non-high ranking civil servants to join any political party or take part in related activities if it does not raise a conflict of interest or bias.

From 1 April and 30 June 2022, the CSB had 944 employees quit.

== Civil Service College ==
The Civil Service College is administered by the CSB. In October 2022, the head of the college, Oscar Kwok Yam-shu, said that some civil servants lacked a deep understanding of the country or national identity.

== See also ==
- Hong Kong Civil Service
