= Commissioner of Customs and Excise =

Head of the Hong Kong Customs and Excise Department

- 海關關長

- Incumbent; Chan Tsz-tat CDSM since 31 December 2024
- Security Bureau
- Deputy: Deputy Commissioner (Control and Enforcement): Woo Wai-kwan CDSM; Deputy Commissioner (Management and Strategic Development): Hui Kim
- Website: Official website

Commissioner of Customs and Excise
- Traditional Chinese: 海關關長
Transcriptions
Yue: Cantonese
- Yale Romanization: Hói gwāan gwāan jéung
- Jyutping: Hoi^{2} gwaan^{1} gwaan^{1} zoeng^{2}

Alternative Chinese name
- Traditional Chinese: 海關總監
Transcriptions
Yue: Cantonese
- Yale Romanization: Hói gwāan júng gāam
- Jyutping: Hoi^{2} gwaan^{1} zung^{2} gaam^{1}

The Commissioner of Customs and Excise (Chinese: 海關關長) is the head of the Hong Kong Customs and Excise Department, which is responsible for monitoring the movement of goods into and out of Hong Kong, customs and excise, duties and investigation of pirated products.

== List of commissioners in Hong Kong SAR ==
No.	Name	Chinese name	Took office	Left office	Source
1	Li Shu-fai SBS JP	李樹輝	1997	1999	
2	John Tsang GBM JP	曾俊華	1999	2001	
3	Raymond Wong GBS JP	黃鴻超	2001	2003	
4	Timothy Tong GBS	湯顯明	2003	2007	
5	Richard Yuen GBS JP	袁銘輝	2007	2011	
6	Clement Cheung GBS JP	張雲正	2011	2015	
7	Roy Tang GBS JP	鄧忍光	2015	2017	
8	Hermes Tang SBS CDSM CMSM	鄧以海	2017	2021	
9	Louise Ho CDSM CMSM	何珮珊	2021	2024	
10	Chan Tsz-tat CDSM	陳子達	2024	Incumbent	

== List of directors in British Hong Kong (pre-1997) ==
No.	Name	Chinese name	Took office	Left office
	Director of Commerce & Industry			
1	David Ronald Holmes		1962	1966
2	Terence Dare Sorby		1966	1970
3	Jack Cater		1970	1972
4	David Harold Jordan		1972	1977
	Director of Trade, Industry and Customs and Commissioner of Customs and Excises			
1	David Harold Jordan		1977	1979
2	William Doward CBE		1979	1982
	Commissioner of Customs and Excises			
1	Douglas Arthur Jordan CMG	莊敦賢	1982	1984
2	Harnam Singh Grewal CBE ED	高禮和	1984	1986
3	Patrick John Williamson ISO	韋能信	1986	1990
4	Clive William Baker Oxley OBE	岳士禮	1990	1993
5	Donald McFarlane Watson OBE QPM CPM	尉遲信	1993	1996
6	Li Shu-fai SBS JP	李樹輝	1996	1997
