= Common Recruitment Examination =

Examination for recruiting civil servants in Hong Kong

- Acronym: CRE
- Administrator: Civil Service Bureau
- Skills tested: English language Chinese language Job skills
- Duration: 3 x 45-minute papers
- Regions: Hong Kong
- Languages: English, Chinese
- Website: Official website

Common Recruitment Examination
- Traditional Chinese: 綜合招聘考試
Transcriptions
Yue: Cantonese
- Yale Romanization: Jung hahp jīu ping háau síh
- Jyutping: Zung3 hap6 ziu1 ping3 haau2 si5

Common Recruitment Examination (Chinese: 綜合招聘考試) is an examination for the recruitment of civil servants in Hong Kong. It consists of three 45-minute papers, namely Use of English (UE), Use of Chinese (UC) and Aptitude Test (AT). Candidates' results in the UE and UC papers are classified as 'Level 2', 'Level 1' or 'Fail', with 'Level 2' being the highest. Results in the AT paper are classified as pass or fail. 'Level 2' and 'Level 1' results of the two language papers and the pass result of the AT paper are of permanent validity. All three papers are in multiple-choice format.
