= Paul Tang (civil servant) =

The Honourable Paul Tang Kwok-wai JP
- 鄧國威

Secretary for the Civil Service
- In office 1 July 2012 – 21 July 2015
- Preceded by: Denise Yue
- Succeeded by: Clement Cheung

Personal details
- Born: 13 January 1956 (age 70) British Hong Kong
- Party: None
- Education: University of Hong Kong

Paul Tang
- Traditional Chinese: 鄧國威
Transcriptions
Yue: Cantonese
- Yale Romanization: Dahng Gwok wāi
- Jyutping: Dang^{6} Gwok^{3} wai^{1}

Paul Tang Kwok-wai JP (Chinese: 鄧國威, born 13 January 1956) is a former Secretary for the Civil Service of Hong Kong.

== Background ==
Tang graduated from the University of Hong Kong in 1978. In the same year, Tang began his civil servant career in the Administrative Service. He was appointed as Deputy Secretary for the Environment and Food in 2000. A year later, Tang was Deputy Secretary for Transport, which later became Deputy Secretary for the Environment, Transport and Works.

In 2003, he began serving as Director of Social Welfare. Tang was appointed as Permanent Secretary for Economic Development and Labour (Labour) and Commissioner for Labour in 2007. After the government re-organisating in July 2007, he served as Permanent Secretary for Labour and Welfare until 2012, which he was appointed as Secretary for the Civil Service.

Political offices
Preceded by Denise Yue	Secretary for the Civil Service; 2012–2015	Succeeded by Clement Cheung
