= Ingrid Yeung =

Hong Kong civil servant (born 1965)

The Honourable Ingrid Yeung Ho Poi-yan JP
- 楊何蓓茵
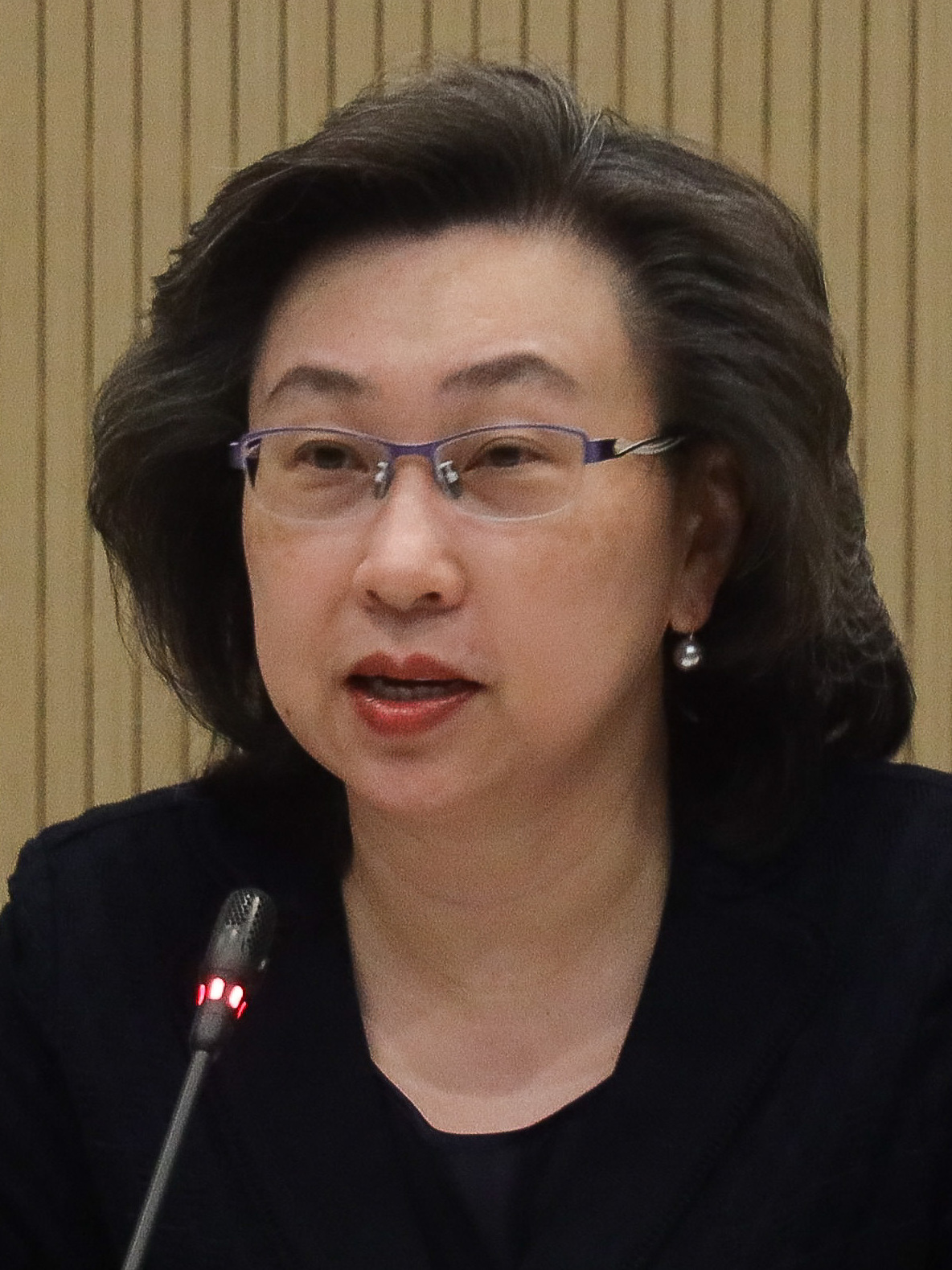
- Yeung in 2023

Secretary for the Civil Service
- Incumbent
- Assumed office 1 July 2022
- Chief Executive: John Lee
- Preceded by: Patrick Nip

Permanent Secretary for the Civil Service
- In office 7 August 2020 – 30 June 2022
- Chief Executive: Carrie Lam
- Preceded by: Thomas Chow
- Succeeded by: Clement Leung

Permanent Secretary for Education
- In office 26 July 2017 – 6 August 2020

Personal details
- Born: January 8, 1965 (age 61)
- Children: 1
- Education: University of Hong Kong

Ingrid Yeung Ho Poi-yan (Chinese: 楊何蓓茵, born 8 January 1965) is the current Secretary for the Civil Service in Hong Kong, appointed on 1 July 2022 as part of John Lee Ka-chiu's administration.

== Biography ==
Yeung attended North Point Virtue Primary School and Kindergarten (kindergarten department, enrolled in 1968), then she enrolled in St. Francis' Canossian College, in 1981, she participated in the "1981 Hong Kong Youth Translation Competition" sponsored by the Home Affairs Department and organized by the Peninsula Junior Chamber of Commerce, and won the first place in the student group.

According to her official government profile, she started government work in 1986 as an executive officer. She was the Commissioner for Transport from 2012-2017, the Permanent Secretary for Education from 2017-2020, and the Permanent Secretary for the Civil Service from 2020-2022.

=== Secretary for the Civil Service ===
In October 2022, Yeung announced that the Civil Service code of conduct would be updated to remove the "political neutrality" core value. In addition, Yeung also said "Events in recent years and the international situation today shows the importance of patriots administering Hong Kong."

In August 2023, Yeung said that civil servants would need to declare all arrests, and could be transferred to other positions or fired; one union representative asked why this was necessary for those found innocent.

In January 2024, Yeung said that civil servants should be careful of their personal opinions and must speak carefully, both in their personal lives and online.
