= Hong Kong Economic and Trade Office, London =

Office of Hong Kong in the United Kingdom

Coordinates: 51.5098°N 0.1437°W

Hong Kong Economic and Trade Office London 香港駐倫敦經濟貿易辦事處
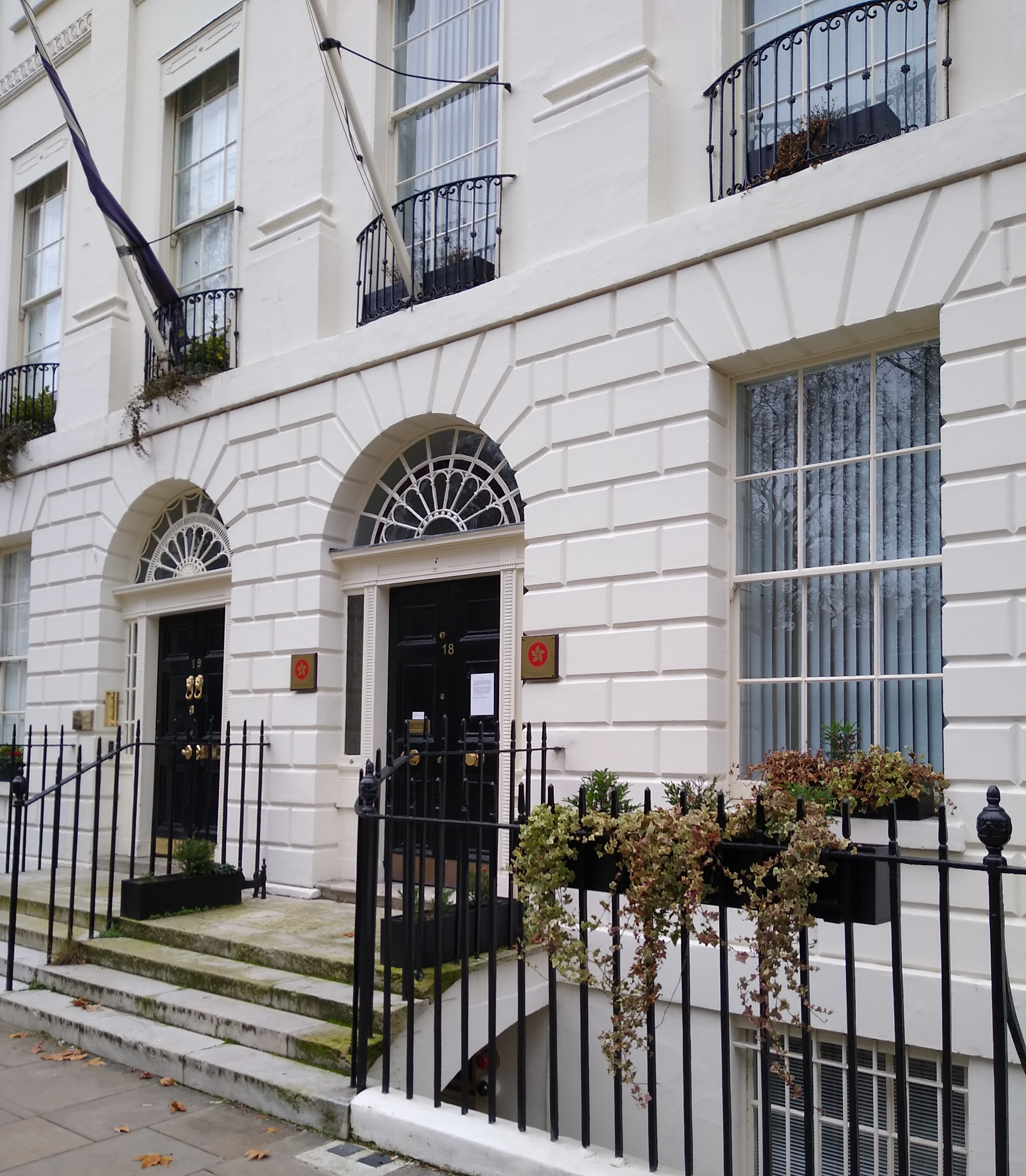

Agency overview
- Jurisdiction: United Kingdom; Denmark; Estonia; Finland; Latvia; Lithuania; Norway; Russia; Sweden
- Headquarters: 18 Bedford Square, London WC1B 3JA
- Agency executive: Gilford Law, Director-General
- Parent agency: Commerce and Economic Development Bureau
- Website: Official website

Hong Kong Economic and Trade Office, London
- Traditional Chinese: 香港駐倫敦經濟貿易辦事處
- Simplified Chinese: 香港驻伦敦经济贸易办事处
Transcriptions
Standard Mandarin
- Hanyu Pinyin: Xiānggǎng Zhù Lúndūn Jīngjì Màoyì Bànshì Chù
Yue: Cantonese
- Jyutping: hoeng1 gong2 zyu3 leon4 deon1 ging1 zai3 mau6 jik6 baan6 si6 cyu3

The Hong Kong Economic and Trade Office London (Chinese: 香港駐倫敦經濟貿易辦事處) is Hong Kong's representation in the United Kingdom. Apart from the United Kingdom, the Office is responsible for fostering trade and economic relations with countries including Denmark, Estonia, Finland, Latvia, Lithuania, Norway, Russia and Sweden. The Office promotes bilateral trade with and investment in Hong Kong, updates the business communities and multiplier organisations on important developments in Hong Kong. It also organizes official visits, seminars and liaison events in the countries concerned, and acts as a hub to support investors from these countries in their search for business opportunities in Hong Kong and mainland China.

The office is located at 18 Bedford Square in the City of Westminster in central London; the building also houses the London office of the London Representative Office of the Hong Kong Trade Development Council and Hong Kong Tourism Board. It was previously located at 6 Grafton Street.

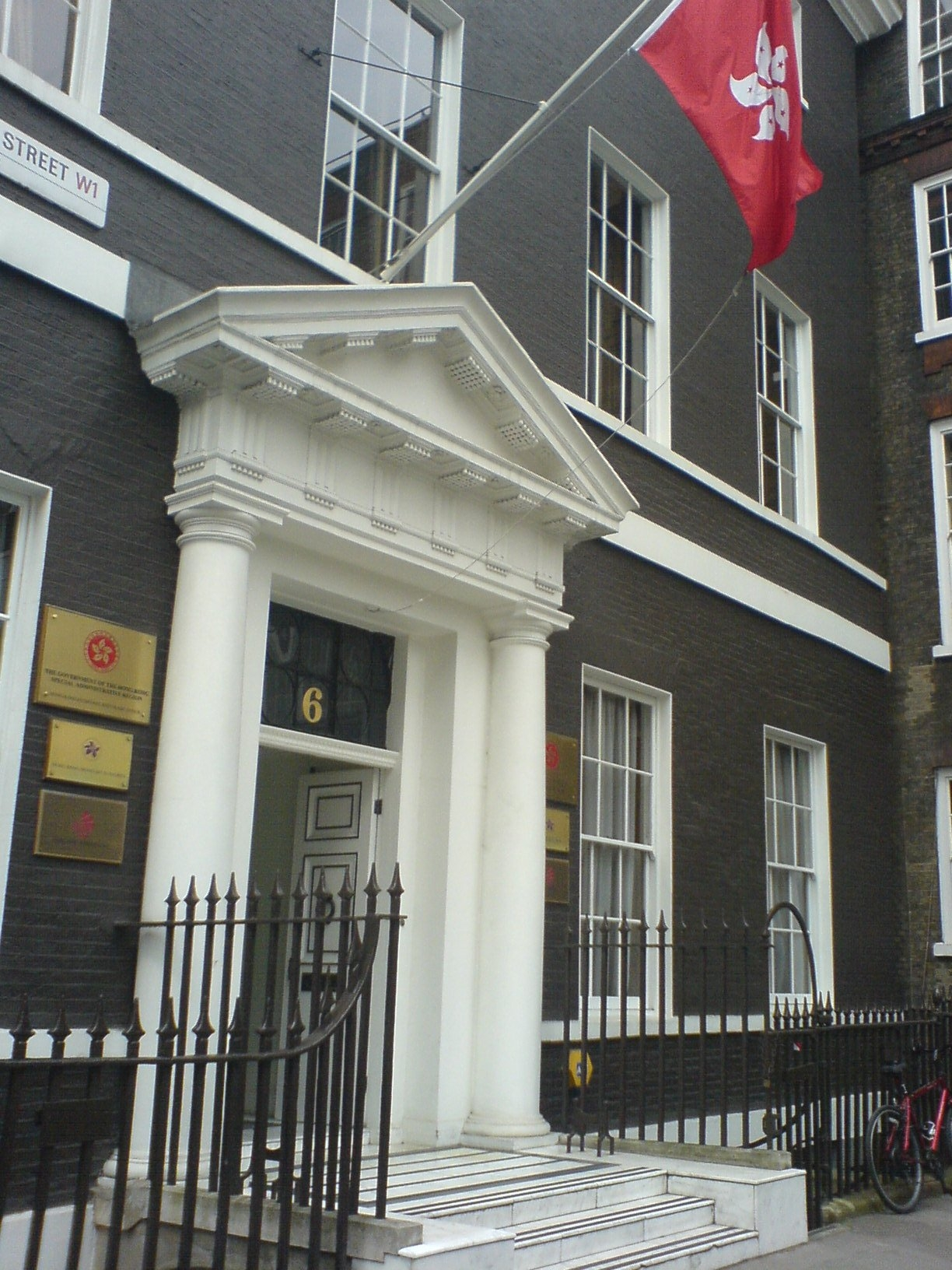
Former office at 6 Grafton Street

The Director-General of the office since 2021 is Gilford Law, who reports to the Special Representative for Hong Kong Economic & Trade Affairs to the European Union, Brussels ETO.

The Hong Kong Economic and Trade Office Act 1996 confers a number of immunities and privileges on HKETO London either in line with or similar to provisions of the Vienna Convention on Consular Relations afforded or accorded to consulates-general and consulates of high commissions and embassies, consulates-general and consulates, codified in the United Kingdom as the Consular Relations Act 1968.

When Hong Kong was under British administration, the office was known as the Hong Kong Government Office and was headed by a Commissioner.

Apart from the UK, HKETO London is also responsible for maintaining ties with Denmark, Estonia, Finland, Latvia, Lithuania, Norway, Russia and Sweden.

Other European countries fall within the purview of Hong Kong Economic and Trade Office, Brussels and Hong Kong Economic and Trade Office, Berlin.

== List of commissioners ==
Commissioners

1. Selwyn Eugene Alleyne (1987–1989)
2. John Francis Yaxley (1989–1994)
3. David Ford (1994–1997)

Directors-General

1. John Tsang Chun-wah (1997–1999)
2. Sandra Birch Lee Suk-yee (1999–2000)
3. Andrew Leung Kin-pong (2000–2004)
4. Carrie Lam Cheng Yuet-ngor (2004–2006)
5. Sarah Wu Po-chu (2006–2011)
6. Agnes Allcock (2011–2013)
7. Erica Ng Lai-man (2013–2015)
8. Priscilla To Kit-lai (2015–2018)
9. Winky So Yuen-ling (2019–2021)
10. Gilford Law Sun-on (2021– )

== See also ==
- Hong Kong Economic and Trade Offices
- British Consulate-General, Hong Kong
- 2024 British Hong Kong spy case
