= Hong Kong trade office spy case =

R v Yuen and Wai
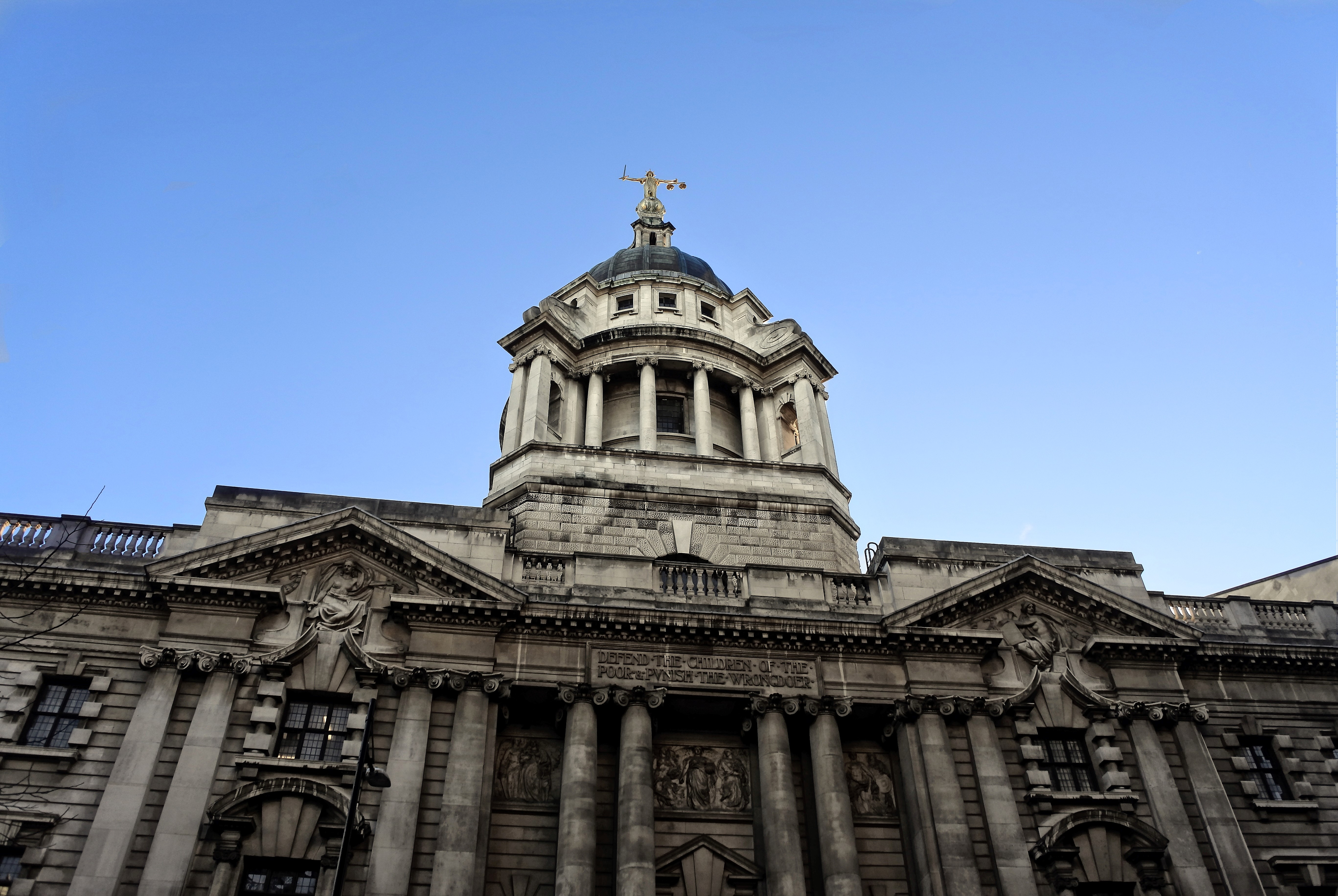
- Court: Central Criminal Court
- Full case name: Rex v Chung Biu (Bill) Yuen & Chi Leung (Peter) Wai
- Started: 2 March 2026
- Decided: 18 June 2026
- Verdict: Yuen sentenced to 8 years in prison Wai sentenced to 10 years in prison
- Charge: Yuen: Assisting a foreign intelligence service (guilty); Foreign interference (not guilty); Wai: Assisting a foreign intelligence service (guilty); Foreign interference (not guilty); Misconduct in Public Office (guilty)
- Transcript: www.judiciary.uk/judgments/r-v-yuen-and-wai/

Court membership
- Judge sitting: Bobbie Cheema-Grubb

Keywords
- National security

R v Yuen and Wai is an English criminal case decided in 2026 concerning national security offences of two Hong Kong-born individuals. It is one of the first prosecutions under the National Security Act.

On 13 May 2024, the Metropolitan Police of London, United Kingdom, announced three men (Bill Yuen, Peter Wai, and Matthew Trickett) had been charged with national security offences for assisting Hong Kong intelligence service and foreign interference, including spying on Nathan Law and other exiled activists of Hong Kong. At the time, Yuen was Administrative Manager of Hong Kong Economic and Trade Office in London (HKETO London). The case has prompted condemnations from Chinese and Hong Kong governments.

Trickett was found dead in Maidenhead later that month, which was suspected to be a suicide. Wai and Yuen were tried at the Old Bailey in 2026, with a jury finding both men guilty of assisting a foreign intelligence service (an offence under the National Security Act 2023). Wai was also convicted of misconduct in a public office. In June 2026, Wai was sentenced to 10 years in prison, with Yuen sentenced to 8 years.

== Background ==
Following the imposition of the Hong Kong national security law in July 2020 by the Chinese Government, which exerts extraterritorial jurisdiction over all non-Chinese citizens, some pro-democracy dissidents fled Hong Kong due to possible prosecutions under the law. Hong Kong police had placed bounties on several individuals, such as ex-legislator Nathan Law, activist Finn Lau, and unionist Christopher Mung, while Chief Executive John Lee said all national security fugitives would be "pursued for life".

The imposition of the legislation also raised concerns that Hong Kong no longer enjoys a high degree of autonomy from China, and there were calls to close overseas Hong Kong representatives offices for their role in lobbying against bills supporting Hong Kong opposition. In November 2023, the United States House Committee on Foreign Affairs passed a bill that would close three Hong Kong Economic and Trade Offices in Washington DC, New York, and San Francisco.

== Prior events ==
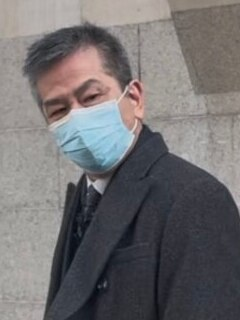
Bill Yuen Chung-biu

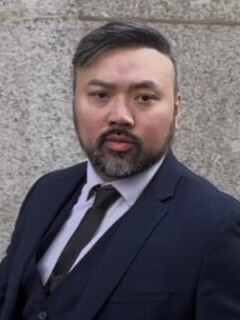
Peter Wai Chi-leung

According to court documents, the spy case was exposed due to a forced entry into a UK residence. In 2023, Monica Kwong Man-ki, a former director at HK YearShine Investment, was accused of defrauding the company out of more than HK$144 million. Civil proceedings have been issued against Kwong in the High Court of Hong Kong (HCA 2069/2023), and the court issued a subpoena in January 2024, but she had already migrated to Britain in December through BN(O) scheme. Kwong said soon after she left Hong Kong, the police asked her mother to persuade her turning in. Soon after discovering Kwong's escape, the new director of Yearshine Tina Tian Zou then employed a private investigator named Hornby to track Kwong down. Hornby knows two retired Hong Kong Police officers, Wing Cheuk and Bill Yuen Chung-biu (Chinese: 袁松彪), personally, and asked them for assistance.

After having the case referred to him by his former colleague Cheuk, Yuen, now working as the Administrative Manager at HKETO London, then tasked Peter Wai Chi-leung (Chinese: 衞志樑) and Matthew Trickett with the operations to track Kwong down. Wai, 38, is a UK Border Force Officer based at Heathrow Airport, and a part-time volunteer Special Constable with the City of London police. He is also understood to be the director of a private security firm registered in the UK called D5 Security Consultancy Limited, and has "over 20 years' experience in the British military, police and private security sector". Matthew Trickett, 37, was an immigration enforcement officer and a director of another security firm called MTR Consultancy that focuses on security, surveillance and private investigations, who served as a British Royal Marine between February 2007 and March 2013.

Cheuk, Wai, Trickett, along with private investigators and personnel from YearShine Investment Limited, conducted a surveillance operation at Kwong's UK home in late January. Financial records obtained by prosecutors show that Wai received a payment of £16,170 from the London HKETO after the January operation, and transferred £1,170 to Trickett on the same day with a note of "SV", believed to be "surveillance".

Three months later, Cheuk departed for London to conduct surveillance against Kwong again. On 23 April, Cheuk transferred £5,500 to Wai prior to the surveillance job at Kwong's residence. On 30 April, Trickett, accompanied by Wai and Cheuk, posed as a maintenance worker and knocked on Kwong's door, but no one responded. The duo returned the next night, and Trickett attempted to deceive an entrance into Kwong's residence by pouring water through the door gap to feign a leakage. He is also shown operating a snake camera to look under the door. The whole process was under Yuen's supervision through Wai's WhatsApp. Kwong then called the police over the harassment. Police arrested the three men at 11pm, during which Wai threw a fake police superintendent's warrant card away while Trickett attempted to hide his phone in the underwear.

== Arrest ==
According to the police statement on 15 May, the anti-terrorism officers arrested 8 men and 1 woman on 1 May. In a police interview after his arrest, Trickett admitted to taking the surveillance job, adding that Wai had told him the job was legal and legitimate. His phone was unlocked by the police, revealing large amount of espionage information by the three men. Those include Nathan Law's residence and working address, and multiple photos of British Hongkongers joining protests. During his conversations with Wai, Yuen said the "overseas youths" were "our enemies" and the importance of "eliminating hatred". The surveillances against Nathan Law began as early as 2021, and another was dated August 2023, a month after Law and seven others were wanted by the police under the national security law.

With evidence gathered, the police arrested Yuen in London the next day. Even though Yuen denied involvement in the job other than being a middleman between Cheuk and Wai, police discovered more photos of overseas Hongkongers taken during protests against Hong Kong and Beijing governments. It was also found that Wai and Trickett received a total of £95,500 from the Trade Office's HSBC bank account between June 2023 and January 2024 through a security company. Another man was arrested in Yorkshire on 2 May.

Amongst the 11 arrestees, 7 men and the woman were released from custody on or before 10 May. The remaining three, Yuen, Wai, and Trickett, were charged by Crown Prosecution Service under the National Security Act 2023. They were brought to Westminster Magistrates' Court on 13 May and was granted court bail, with conditions including a 10pm to 5am curfew, reporting weekly to their local police station, no international travel and informing police of devices used to access the internet. The trio did not respond to questions from a mass of reporters when entering and exiting the court.

== Pre-trial events ==
After bail granted, Trickett was found dead by a member of the public in Grenfell Park, Maidenhead on 19 May. Local media reported that Trickett attempted suicide under police's detention, and told the police officers that he would commit suicide once released since he no longer has a reason to live. The prosecution argued against granting court bail to Trickett on the basis of his personal safety citing his suicidal history, but was rejected by the judge. The death was later ruled as not suspicious, and was considered to be a suicide. An inquest into the death of Trickett will take place in November 2026. The prosecution against Trickett was also dropped.

== Trial ==
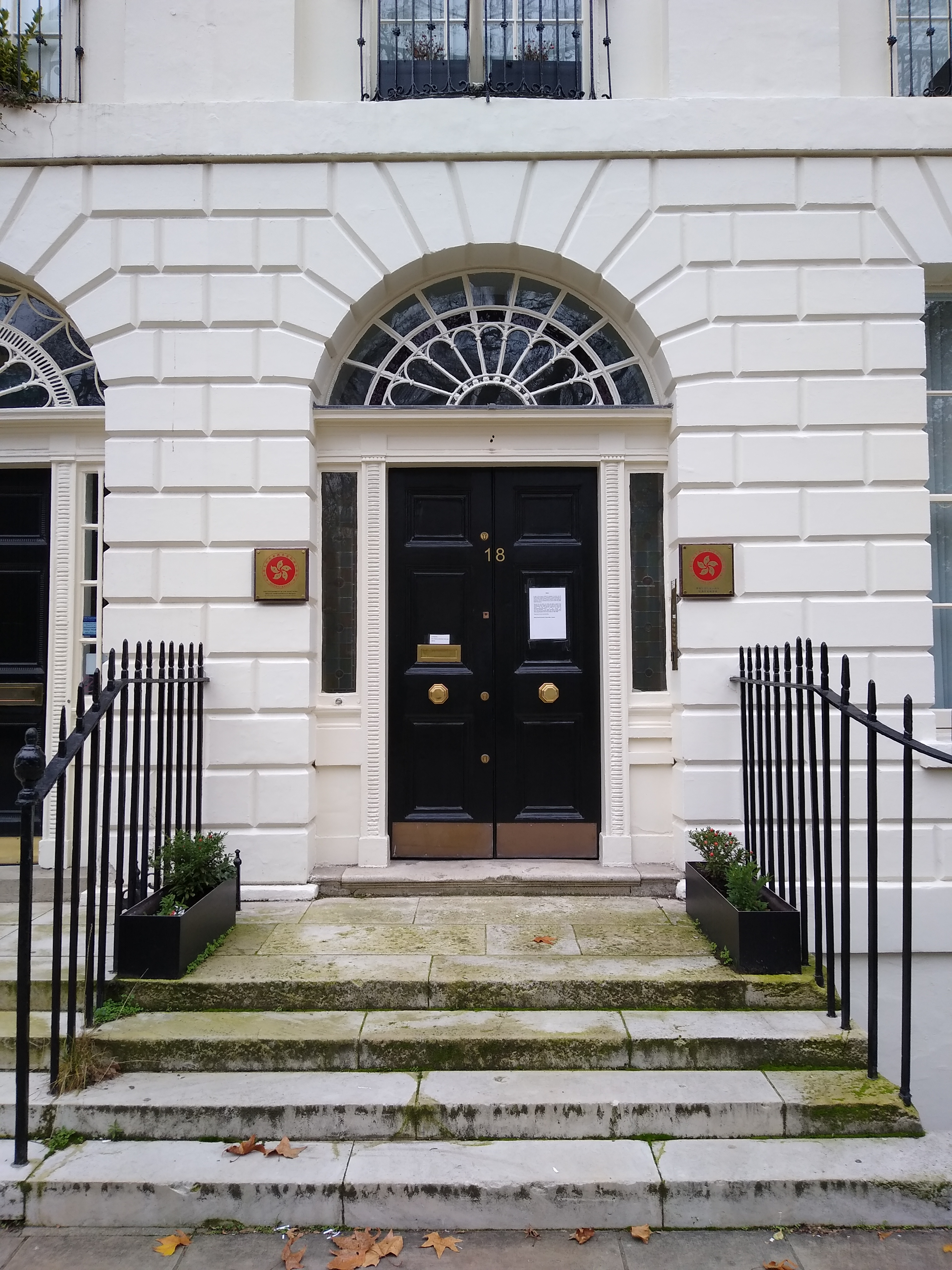
Hong Kong Economic and Trade Office in London, located in Westminster

The pair were tried at the Old Bailey by Justice Bobbie Cheema-Grubb, with trial beginning on 2 March 2026, and lasting for two months. Yuen was charged with one count of assisting a foreign intelligence service and one count of foreign interference, both under the National Security Act. Wai was charged with the two security offences and one count of misconduct in Public Office, for accessing the computer system at the Home Office without a reasonable justification between February 2022 and May 2024. Two senior officials from the trade office attended the trial.

The prosecution confirmed the 8 individuals that were arrested and released by the police include Tina Zou and three veteran policemen involved in the surveillance on dissidents of Hong Kong: Suen Wa-hing, a former superintendent at Hong Kong Police Force, Cheuk Wing-cheung, an ex-police inspector, and Eddie Ma, who was a Chief Superintendent. Eddie Ma was said to have paid Wai at a monthly rate of £2,000 to infiltrate pro-democracy group Hongkongers in the UK. George Lee, a retired Security Bureau official, asked Yuen for spying on an activist wanted by the Hong Kong national security police, and for information of several British politicians including Baroness Kennedy of The Shaws and Iain Duncan Smith, ex-leader of the Conservative Party. Yuen handed Wai the tasks, who then employed Matthew Trickett for surveillance. Trickett also contacted a private detective Jonathan Dunn, who was arrested as well, to assist due to the heavy workload. The prosecution accused that the trade office, where Yuen worked as an official, therefore became a site to organise and fund espionage in the UK, while the retired policemen act as organisers through a WeChat group. However, due to a lack in translation expertise, the police was unable to gather sufficient evidence against them and therefore other members of the spying network were released by the police and subsequently returned to Hong Kong.

The court also heard that Wai and Trickett used the Home Office's computer system to acquire details about their targets, including dissidents such as Nathan Law, Ted Hui, Finn Lau, and Christopher Mung Siu-tat, who fled to the UK from Hong Kong. In 2023, under the order from Wai, Trickett's team followed Law and secretly took pictures of him at an Oxford Union event. A reporter from state-affiliated media Ta Kung Pao was also tasked by Eddie Ma earlier to spy on Law.

Apart from prominent exiled activists, the operation was also extended to other pro-democracy Hongkongers. By November 2020, Wai, under the pretense as a supporter of the democracy movement got in touch with a Hong Kong family who was seeking asylum and reported their personal information to Ma, who asked Wai to investigate one of the family members that was arrested for burning a Chinese national flag. In early 2021, Wai, as a Border Force officer at Heathrow Airport, deported a Hong Kong family of 12 who were holding BN(O) passports. The news was caught up by pro-China commentators and became a frontpage report by pro-democracy newspaper Apple Daily. Doxxed by protesters, Wai was concerned that his cover would be exposed and was asked by Eddie Ma to turn low profile. Two years later, during a visit by a Hong Kong minister Christopher Hui, Wai was accused to have stopped a protester and threated to arrest him as a special constable of the Metropolitan Police. In one rally organised by the Hongkong diaspora, Wai reported to Ma that triad members from 14K were seen assaulting the protesters. Other targets by the spying network include Monica Kwong, a Chinese dissident, and two Chinese designers. Head of the Operation Fox Hunt office was also allegedly involved in Kwong's case.

== Verdict ==
On 7 May, the jury of 12 found both men guilty by a 10-2 majority of assisting a foreign intelligence service. Wai was also convicted unanimously of misconduct in a public office. Both defendants were acquitted on the charge of foreign interference, which involves the case of Monica Kwong. The judge ordered a restriction in media's report until the prosecution decided not to pursue a retrial over the acquittal.

Justice Cheema-Grubb said the spying by Yuen and Wai was due to their loyalty to the Chinese government and were "deliberate, concerted and serious", causing significant harm to the safety of Hongkongers in the UK and leaving those targeted in fear. The judge also said Wai was arrogant on his misconduct. She sentenced Wai to 10 years in prison (in which 6 years are for the national security conviction) and Yuan to 8 years.

== Reactions ==
=== Prior to the trial ===
On the day charges were published, the Chinese Embassy in the UK said in a statement that the embassy "firmly rejects and strong condemns" the accusations which it warned could damage bilateral relations, and urged the UK to immediately correct the wrongdoing and end "all forms of political manipulation against China" including spreading "Chinese threat theory". Cui Jianchun, China's foreign affairs commissioner in Hong Kong, made a "solemn representation" to Britain's Hong Kong Consul General Brian Davidson over "unreasonable slander" towards Hong Kong. The office had already "strongly condemned" Britain for "fabricating" charges to "trample" on rule of law in the name of national security, and accused it of a "vicious intention to interfere" in Hong Kong's affairs. It warned that Britain would receive "China's firm and strong retaliation". The Hong Kong government said in a statement that it "seriously demanded" the UK to fairly handle the matter and provide full details of the alleged matter. It added the UK should protect the legitimate rights and interests of the office manager, ensuring that the normal work of the Economic and Trade Office is not affected. Chief Executive John Lee, who was photographed with Yuen and others at a 2002 Charles Sturt University policing course graduation, said he had no memory of meeting Yuen and his impression of Yuen is only that photo. Lee added "any attempt to make unwarranted allegations against the [Hong Kong] government is unacceptable." The Pro-Beijing camp in Hong Kong also slammed the British national security law. Executive Council convenor and ex-security minister Regina Ip called it "strict" with broad and vague definitions. She also said it was "legal" for the trade offices to gather intelligence on activists calling for sanctions against the city.

The British government summoned Chinese ambassador Zheng Zeguang on 14 May. The foreign ministry said it was "unequivocal in setting out that the recent pattern of behaviour directed by China against the UK, including cyber-attacks, reports of espionage links and the issuing of bounties, is not acceptable". Tom Tugendhat, British Security Minister, said the legislation was a "game-changer" to "crack down on foreign intelligence services and hostile actors".

Nathan Law said the allegations are "not surprising", while Simon Cheng, who founded Hongkongers in Britain and also has a bounty, said it showed the British government took the growing safety concerns of Hongkongers seriously. UK-based Hongkongers protested outside the trade office to support police's move to charge the alleged spies and urged London to revoke diplomatic immunity of the office.

=== After conviction ===
Chinese ambassador Zheng Zeguang was summoned by the Foreign Office following the verdict to protest against shadow police operation by foreign entities. Dan Jarvis, Minister of State for Security, urged Hongkongers to "be alert, but not afraid" and reaffirmed the government's commitment to protect Hongkongers' rights. Jarvis also named Hong Kong Police Force as the intelligence agency of the case and demanded the dismissal of Yuen from the trade office. Foreign Secretary Yvette Cooper said harassments and surveillance targeting Hongkongers in Britain were and will not be tolerated.

The Chinese and Hong Kong governments denounced the trial and the verdict as a show and an abuse of law. Hong Kong authorities confirmed that Yuen's expenses in the trial were paid by taxpayers' money since Yuen is employed by the government, but reiterated that the allegations were completely unrelated to the operation of the trade office. Several pro-China groups and parties staged protests outside the British Consulate-General as well.

Hong Kong media had only limited coverage on the trial, which was seen as an attempt to avoid widespread discussion in the society.

== See also ==
- Chinese police overseas service stations
- Chinese espionage in the United Kingdom
- Long-arm jurisdiction
- Transnational repression
- Transnational repression by China
