= Administrative Officer (Hong Kong) =

High-ranking civil service grade in the Government of Hong Kong

The Administrative Officer (AO) grade (Chinese: 政務主任) is a high-ranking civil service grade in the Government of Hong Kong.

== History ==
=== Colonial era (1862-1997) ===
The colonial Hong Kong civil service was created in the image of the British civil service, with administrative, executive, and clerical grades. The British administrative class consisted of the four grades directly below the permanent secretaries and undersecretaries, and was directly recruited from the young graduates of elite universities.

The Hong Kong administrative service was created in 1862 by Sir Hercules Robinson, with civil servants in this grade known as Cadet Officers until 1960. From 1862 to 1941, 85 cadets were appointed, with three becoming governors of Hong Kong, (Note: Francis Henry May, Cecil Clementi, and Alexander Grantham) five becoming governors or high commissioners of other British territories, two becoming chief justices of Hong Kong, (Note: James Russell and Joseph Horsford Kemp) and four attaining the rank of Colonial Secretary in Hong Kong.

The size of this administrative establishment was always small; there were seven cadets in 1880, thirteen in 1900, doubling to 31 in 1920, and reaching 37 in 1941. The cadets, who mostly shared similar social backgrounds and values, formed a "corps d'elite" that administered the colony's affairs. Sir Ralph Furse, who served as director of recruitment for the British Colonial Service from 1931 to 1948, observed that "in most colonies the Civil Servant is the Government, and not the servant of Government".

In 1962, the government recruited the first batch of female Administrative Officers, including Katherine Fok and Anson Chan, who would later become the first local Chief Secretary of Hong Kong.

=== After the Handover (1997-present) ===
Upon the introduction of the Principal Officials Accountability System in 2002, which created a new layer of politically appointed ministers above the politically neutral civil servant heads of bureaux, many ministers were former administrative officers who had previously served as permanent secretaries of the various bureaux during their time in the civil service. Two of Hong Kong's five chief executives were former administrative officers. Coupled with the administrative officers' main responsibility of policymaking, it has been said that Hong Kong had an "administrative officer-led governing system".

However, after the selection of John Lee, a former police officer who served as secretary for security during the 2019 protests, as Chief Executive in 2022, and the appointment of Eric Chan, a former immigration officer, as Chief Secretary, commentators observed that the central government had decided to shift their trust from "elite" administrative officers groomed in the British tradition to officials from the disciplined services, with some seeing it as the end of the "AO era". Tammy Tam, editor-in-chief of the SCMP, wrote in 2021 that the shift reflected Beijing's determination to "transform civil service culture from one focused on political neutrality to patriotism".

== Role ==
The AOs are cadres of professional administrators who play key roles in the government agencies. The AOs are posted around a wide variety of posts in the Government Secretariat, bureaux and departments at regular intervals. The AOs assist in formulating government policies closely related to society, as well as managing and monitoring the uses of public resources in the bureaux. In addition, the AOs manage and supervise relevant departments for providing services to the public. Furthermore, the AOs serving in the District Offices are responsible for supervising and coordinating the provision of government services and facilities by relevant agencies in the districts, serving as frontline representatives for the government, and monitoring community development plans.

AOs form the most senior grades of the civil service, with permanent secretaries, heads of departments, and other senior leadership positions drawn almost exclusively from the grade. Recruitment is highly competitive, with more than 12,500 applicants for 50 vacancies in 2023.

== Grade structure ==
Principal official
Permanent Secretary
AO Staff Grade A1 (D8)
Department Director
AO Staff Grade A (D6)
Deputy Secretary
AO Staff Grade B1 (D4)	Deputy Director
AO Staff Grade B (D3)	AO Staff Grade B (D3)
Principal Assistant Secretary	Assistant Director	District Officer
AO Staff Grade C (D2)	AO Staff Grade C (D2)	AO Staff Grade C (D2)
Assistant Secretary	Senior Administrative Officer; Administrative Officer	Assistant District Officer

== Ranks and Pay scales ==
Level	Positions in English	Positions in Chinese
Directorate Pay Scale Point 8 (D8)	Administrative Officer Staff Grade A1 (Permanent Secretary of Bureau)	首長級甲一級政務官（決策局常任秘書長）
Directorate Pay Scale Point 6 (D6)	Administrative Officer Staff Grade A (Head of Department)	首長級甲級政務官（部門首長）
Directorate Pay Scale Point 4 (D4)	Administrative Officer Staff Grade B1 (Deputy Secretary of Bureau)	首長級乙一級政務官（決策局副秘書長）
Directorate Pay Scale Point 3 (D3)	Administrative Officer Staff Grade B (Deputy Secretary of Bureau, deputy director of Department)	首長級乙級政務官（決策局副秘書長、部門副署/處長）
Directorate Pay Scale Point 2 (D2)	Administrative Officer Staff Grade C (Principal Assistant Secretary of Bureau, assistant director of department, District Officer)	首長級丙級政務官（決策局首席助理秘書長、部門助理署/處長、民政事務專員）
Master Pay Scale Point 45 to 49	Senior Administrative Officer (Assistant Secretary of Bureau, Assistant District Officer)	高級政務主任（決策局助理秘書長、民政事務助理專員）
Master Pay Scale Point 27 to 44	Administrative Officer (Assistant Secretary of Bureau, Assistant District Officer)	政務主任（決策局助理秘書長、民政事務助理專員）

== Entry requirements ==
1. A bachelor's degree with first or second class honours from any university in Hong Kong, or equivalent;
  - A bachelor's degree or above from any university in Hong Kong, or possess equivalent academic qualifications, and their overall academic qualifications must be similar to the entry requirements listed in (1);
2. A passing grade in the aptitude test paper of the Common Recruitment Examination (CRE);
3. Meeting the language proficiency requirements, that is, obtain "Level 2" scores in the two language papers (Use of Chinese and Use of English) in the CRE, or equivalent;
4. A passing score in the "Basic Law and Hong Kong national security law" test (degree/professional level grade);
5. Candidates must have permanent residency in Hong Kong.
- Applicants will also be required to pass the Joint Recruitment Examination (JRE).

== See also ==
- Political Appointments System
- Permanent secretary
