= Secretary for Education =

Official in the Hong Kong Government

Hong Kong Special Administrative Region Secretary for Education 教育局局長
- Emblem of Hong Kong

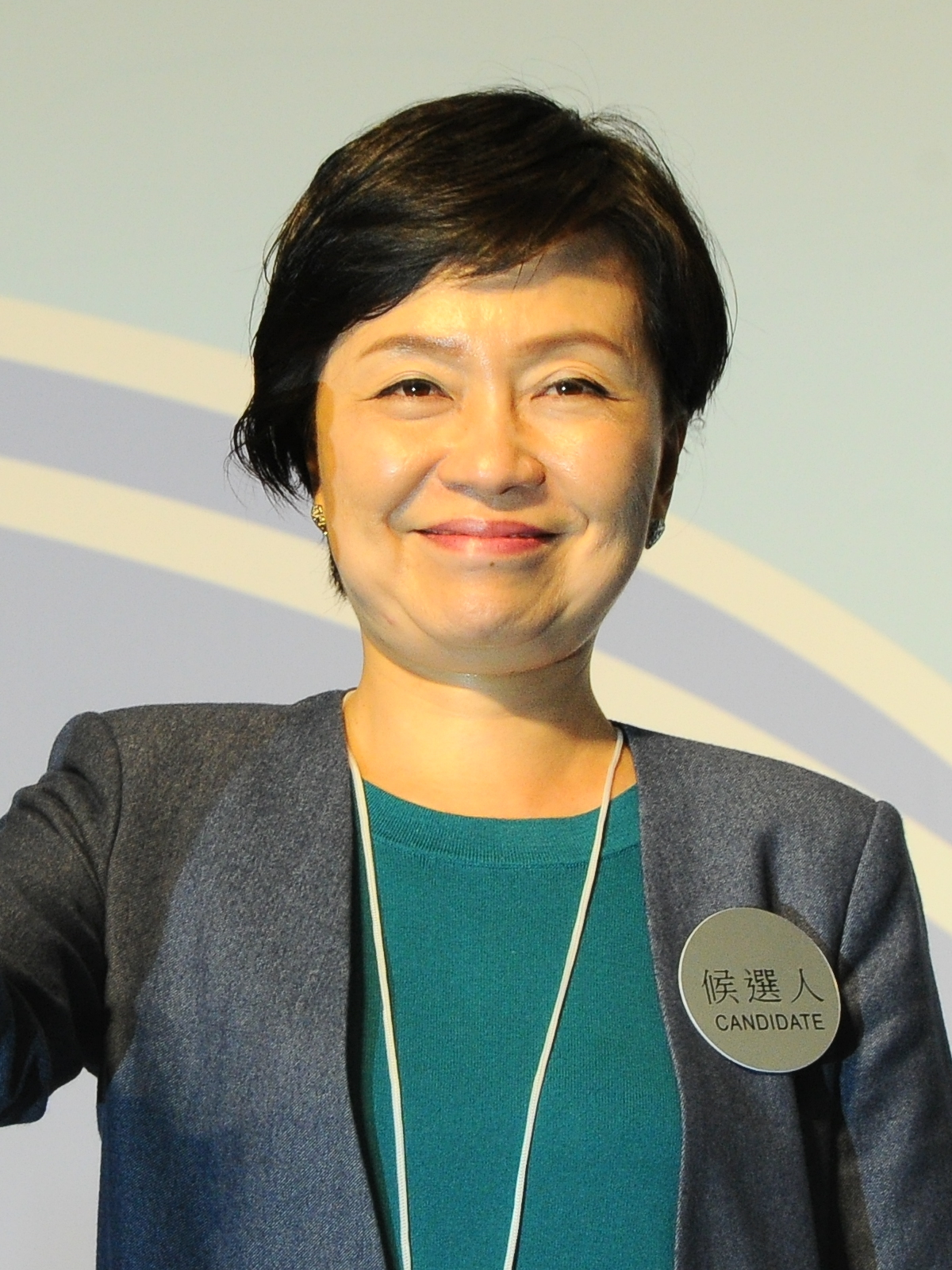
- Incumbent; Christine Choi since 1 July 2022
- Education Bureau
- Style: The Honourable
- Appointer: Central People's Government nomination by Chief Executive
- Inaugural holder: Joseph Wong; Secretary for Education and Manpower; Michael Suen; Secretary for Education
- Formation: 1 July 1997; 1 July 2007
- Salary: HK$4,021,200 per annum
- Website: EDB

Secretary for Education
- Traditional Chinese: 教育局局長
Transcriptions
Yue: Cantonese
- Yale Romanization: Gaau yuhk guhk guhk jéung
- Jyutping: Gaau^{3} juk^{6} guk^{6} guk^{6} zoeng^{2}

The Secretary for Education is a principal official in the Hong Kong Government, who heads the Education Bureau (EDB). The current office holder is Christine Choi.

== History ==
The position of Secretary for Education and Manpower was set up in 1983 when the old Education Department was restructured into the Education and Manpower Branch and Education Department, and the old position of Director of Education was split into SEM and Director of Education accordingly, with the latter reporting to the former.

Since the Principal Officials Accountability System (POAS) was introduced in 2002, the SEM, as all other secretary positions, is an ex officio member of the Executive Council (ExCo). The position is a political appointment, and its term expires when the Chief Executive leaves office.

Before the introduction of the POAS in July 2002, the SEM, as well as all other secretary-level positions, was a civil service position. The office holder was not a member of the ExCo. Before 1991, the office holders may be appointed by the Governor as ex officio member of the Legislative Council.

At the same time when the POAS was introduced in 2002, the responsibility of labour issues was transferred to the Secretary for Economic Development and Labour, formerly Secretary for Economic Services.

According to the proposal tabled by Donald Tsang's administration after he was re-elected as the Chief Executive, the manpower portfolio was transferred to the new Secretary for Labour and Welfare on 1 July 2007. The position of SEM was renamed Secretary for Education.

== List of office holders ==
Political party: Nonpartisan

=== Inspectors of Schools, 1862–1909 ===
No.	Portrait	Name	Term of office		Governor	Ref
1		Frederick Stewart 史釗域	3 March 1862	6 March 1878	Sir Hercules Robinson	
1		Frederick Stewart 史釗域	3 March 1862	6 March 1878	Sir Richard MacDonnell (1866–1872)	
1		Frederick Stewart 史釗域	3 March 1862	6 March 1878	Sir Arthur Kennedy (1872–1877)	
1		Frederick Stewart 史釗域	3 March 1862	6 March 1878	Sir John Hennessy (1877–1882)	
2		Ernest John Eitel 歐德理	7 March 1878	1897	Sir John Hennessy (1877–1882)	
2		Ernest John Eitel 歐德理	7 March 1878	1897	Sir George Bowen (1883–1885)	
2		Ernest John Eitel 歐德理	7 March 1878	1897	Sir William Des Voeux (1887–1891)	
2		Ernest John Eitel 歐德理	7 March 1878	1897	Sir William Robinson (1891–1898)	
3		Arthur Winbolt Brewin 蒲魯賢	15 August 1897	1901	Sir William Robinson (1891–1898)	
3		Arthur Winbolt Brewin 蒲魯賢	15 August 1897	1901	Sir Henry Blake (1898–1903)	
4		Edward Alexander Irving 伊榮	24 April 1901	7 April 1909	Sir Henry Blake (1898–1903)	
4		Edward Alexander Irving 伊榮	24 April 1901	7 April 1909	Sir Matthew Nathan (1903–1907)	
4		Edward Alexander Irving 伊榮	24 April 1901	7 April 1909	Sir Frederick Lugard (1907–1912)	

=== Directors of Education, 1909–1941 ===
No.	Portrait	Name	Term of office		Governor	Ref
1		Edward Alexander Irving 伊榮	8 April 1909	7 February 1924	Sir Frederick Lugard (1907–1912)	
1		Edward Alexander Irving 伊榮	8 April 1909	7 February 1924	Sir Francis Henry May (1912–1918)	
1		Edward Alexander Irving 伊榮	8 April 1909	7 February 1924	Sir Reginald Edward Stubbs (1919–1925)	
2		Geoffrey Norman Orme 庵氏	1924	1926	Sir Reginald Edward Stubbs (1919–1925)	
2		Geoffrey Norman Orme 庵氏	1924	1926	Sir Cecil Clementi (1925–1930)	
3		Alan Eustace Wood 活雅倫	1926	1933	Sir Cecil Clementi (1925–1930)	
3		Alan Eustace Wood 活雅倫	1926	1933	Sir William Peel (1930–1935)	
4		Norman Lockhart Smith 史美	1933	1934	Sir William Peel (1930–1935)	
5		Geoffrey Robley Sayer 佘義	1934	1938	Sir William Peel (1930–1935)	
5		Geoffrey Robley Sayer 佘義	1934	1938	Sir Andrew Caldecott (1935–1937)	
5		Geoffrey Robley Sayer 佘義	1934	1938	Sir Geoffry Northcote (1937–1941)	
6		Clifford George Sollis 梳利士	1938	1941	Sir Geoffry Northcote (1937–1941)	
6		Clifford George Sollis 梳利士	1938	1941	Mark Aitchison Young (1941)	

=== Directors of Education, 1946–1983 ===
No.	Portrait	Name	Term of office		Governor	Ref
7		Thomas Richmond Rowell 柳惠露	1946	1950	Sir Mark Aitchison Young (1946–1947)	
7		Thomas Richmond Rowell 柳惠露	1946	1950	Sir Alexander Grantham (1947–1957)	
8		Douglas James Smyth Crozier 高詩雅	1950	28 April 1961	Sir Alexander Grantham (1947–1957)	
8		Douglas James Smyth Crozier 高詩雅	1950	28 April 1961	Sir Robert Brown Black (1958–1964)	
9		Peter Donohue 唐露曉	29 April 1961	20 February 1964	Sir Robert Brown Black (1958–1964)	
10		William David Gregg 簡乃傑	21 February 1964	5 June 1969	Sir David Trench (1964–1971)	
11		John Canning 簡寧	6 June 1969	1974	Sir David Trench (1964–1971)	
11		John Canning 簡寧	6 June 1969	1974	Sir Murray MacLehose (1971–1982)	
12		Kenneth Wallis Joseph Topley 陶建	1974	1983	Sir Murray MacLehose (1971–1982)	

=== Secretaries for Education and Manpower, 1983–1997 ===
No.	Portrait	Name	Term of office		Governor	Ref
1		James Neil Henderson 韓達誠	1983	25 August 1986	Sir Edward Youde (1982–1986)	
2		R. G. B. Bridge 布立之	26 August 1986	1989	Sir David Wilson (1987–1992)	
3		Yeung Kai-yin 楊啟彥	1989	1991	Sir David Wilson (1987–1992)	
4		John Chan 陳祖澤	1991	1993	Sir David Wilson (1987–1992)	
4		John Chan 陳祖澤	1991	1993	Chris Patten (1992–1997)	
5		Leung Man-kin 梁文建	1993	1995	Chris Patten (1992–1997)	
6		Joseph Wong 王永平	August 1995	30 June 1997	Chris Patten (1992–1997)	

=== Secretaries for Education and Manpower, 1997–2007 ===
No.	Portrait	Name	Term of office		Duration	Chief Executive	Term	Ref
1		Joseph Wong Wing-ping 王永平	1 July 1997	3 July 2000	3 years, 2 days	Tung Chee-hwa (1997–2005)	1	
2		Fanny Law Fan Chiu-fun 羅范椒芬	3 July 2000	3 June 2002	1 year, 362 days	Tung Chee-hwa (1997–2005)	1	
3		Arthur Li Kwok-cheung 李國章	1 July 2002	30 June 2007	5 years, 0 days	Tung Chee-hwa (1997–2005)	2	
3		Arthur Li Kwok-cheung 李國章	1 July 2002	30 June 2007	5 years, 0 days	Donald Tsang (2005–2012)	2	

=== Secretaries for Education, 2007–present ===
No.	Portrait	Name	Term of office		Duration	Chief Executive	Term	Ref
1		Michael Suen Ming-yeung 孫明揚	1 July 2007	30 June 2012	5 years, 0 days	Donald Tsang (2005–2012)	3	
2		Eddie Ng Hak-kim 吳克儉	1 July 2012	30 June 2017	5 years, 0 days	Leung Chun-ying (2012–2017)	4	
3		Kevin Yeung Yun-hung 楊潤雄	1 July 2017	30 June 2022	5 years, 0 days	Carrie Lam (2017–2022)	5	
4		Christine Choi Yuk-lin 蔡若蓮	1 July 2022	Incumbent	4 years, 123 days	John Lee (2022–present)	6	

== See also ==
- Hong Kong Government
- Government departments and agencies in Hong Kong
