= Edward Alexander Irving =

British colonial official

Edward Alexander Irving (24 July 1870 – 24 January 1958) was a British colonial official. He was the first Director of Education of Hong Kong, serving from 1909 to 1924. Before that he was the Inspector of Schools from 1901 to 1909.

== Biography ==
Irving was born in Bukit Tunggal, Singapore on 24 July 1870. At the age of 21, he joined the Perak Civil Service as a junior officer. He was qualified in law during his service in the Malay States and acquired a knowledge of Malay, Hakka, and Cantonese. He filled various appointments in Perak and Selangor in the Mines Departments and Chinese Protectorate.

Irving was assigned to Hong Kong in April 1901 as Inspector of Schools. He also acted as Registrar-General and member of the Legislative Council of Hong Kong on several occasions. He wrote a report titled The System of Education in Hong Kong in 1902. On the matter of mixed race schools, Irving thought that the school should be reserved for "scholars of European British Parentage exclusively." He went on to become Hong Kong's first Director of Education in 1909, in which he held the position until 1924.

During his stay in Hong Kong, Irving resided at "Kinta," the Peak. He died on 24 January 1958 in Richmond Road Kingston, Surrey, England. He married Dorothy Mabel Bray and had children named Archibald Denys and Rachel Mary. Archibald was the Second Lieutenant of the 82nd Brigade of the Royal Field Artillery. He died of wounds on 16 September 1918 in Somme, France. Rachel was one of the first three women admitted to the University of Hong Kong in 1920 with Irene Cheng and Lai Po-chen.

Government offices
Preceded by Arthur Winbolt Brewin	Inspector of Schools; 1901–1909	Succeeded by Himself as Director of Education
Preceded by Himself as Inspector of Schoolsn	Director of Education; 1909–1924	Succeeded by Geoffrey Norman Orme
