= Douglas James Smyth Crozier =

Irish educator and civil servant (1908–1976)

Douglas James Smyth Crozier CMG
- Born: 20 March 1908; Ballinamallard, Northern Ireland
- Died: 17 November 1976 (aged 68); Tandragee, Northern Ireland
- Occupations: Educator, civil servant
- Office: Director of Education
- Term: 1950–1961
- Spouse: Ann Crozier

Douglas James Smyth Crozier
- Traditional Chinese: 高詩雅
Transcriptions
Yue: Cantonese
- Jyutping: gou1 si1 ngaa5

Douglas James Smyth Crozier, CMG (20 March 1908 – 17 November 1976) was an Irish teacher, civil servant and the Director of Education of Hong Kong.

== Biography ==
Crozier was born in Ballinamallard, Ireland (now part of Northern Ireland) on 20 March 1908. He arrived in Hong Kong around the 1930s as a history teacher at the Hong Kong government's Education Department and taught at the King's College. He was a founding member of the Hong Kong Teacher's Association.

He was a Captain in the 2nd Battery of the Hong Kong Volunteer Defence Corps. He was captured by the Japanese on Christmas Day, 1941 after fighting at Stanley during the Battle of Hong Kong, and was held as a prisoner of war. His wife and children were evacuated to Sydney. He spent four years imprisoned at the Argyle Street Officers' Camp, and then at Shamshuipo. After the war he became an editor of the Hong Kong Teacher's Association's journal, the Path of Learning. He was appointed the Director of Education from 1950 to 1961 and also an official member of the Legislative Council of Hong Kong in that capacity. He was also the member of the Court and Senate of the University of Hong Kong. In 1956, he became an official member of the Executive Council of Hong Kong.

During his service as the Director of Education, he was responsible for the establishment of the Evening School of Higher Chinese Studies; the Grantham Training College, and the New Technical College; a seven-year primary school expansion programme; the development of post-secondary colleges towards degree-granting status, grant-in-aid schemes to three colleges; schemes that provide aid to a host of private schools in Hong Kong.

Crozier retired in 1961 and returned to the United Kingdom. He died in Tandragee, Northern Ireland on 17 November 1976 at the age of 68.

== Honours ==
For his contributions to the development of Hong Kong's education system, Queen Elizabeth II appointed Crozier a Companion of the Order of St Michael and St George in 1957. He was also awarded an honorary degree by the University of Hong Kong in 1961. In 1969 he was awarded an honorary Doctor of Laws from the Chinese University of Hong Kong. Crozier House, one of the four houses of King George V School in Kowloon, is also named after him.

== Personal life ==
Crozier met his wife Ann, a native Londoner, at the University College London, where they were both studying education. They had three children, Julian and Corin and Douglas Jr.

Government offices
Preceded by Thomas Richmond Rowell	Director of Education; 1950–1961	Succeeded by Peter Donohue
