= Hongkong Post =

Government department of Hong Kong

- Type: Trading fund
- Industry: Post, philately
- Genre: Postal service
- Founded: 1841; 185 years ago
- Founder: Royal Mail
- Headquarters: Hongkong Post Headquarters, 2 Connaught Place Central, Hong Kong
- Area served: Hong Kong
- Key people: Leonia Tai, Postmaster General and General Manager of the Post Office Trading Fund
- Products: Mail delivery, philatelic products
- Services: Postal services, philatelic services
- Revenue: HKD$4,784,000,000 (2021/22)
- Owner: Government of Hong Kong
- Number of employees: 5,951 (2022)
- Parent: Government of Hong Kong
- Website: hongkongpost.hk

Hongkong Post
- Traditional Chinese: 香港郵政
- Simplified Chinese: 香港邮政
Transcriptions
Standard Mandarin
- Hanyu Pinyin: Xiānggǎng Yóuzhèng
Yue: Cantonese
- Yale Romanization: Hēung góng yàuh jing
- Jyutping: Hoeng^{1} Gong^{2} Jau^{4} Zing^{3}

Post Office
- Traditional Chinese: 郵政署
- Simplified Chinese: 邮政署
Transcriptions
Standard Mandarin
- Hanyu Pinyin: Yóuzhèngshǔ
Yue: Cantonese
- Jyutping: jau4 zing3 cyu5

Hongkong Post is a government department of Hong Kong responsible for postal services, though operated as a trading fund. Founded in 1841, it was known as Postal Department or Post Office (Chinese: 郵政署) before the handover of Hong Kong in 1997. It has been a sub-member of the Universal Postal Union since 1877, and is a separate entity from China Post.

== History ==
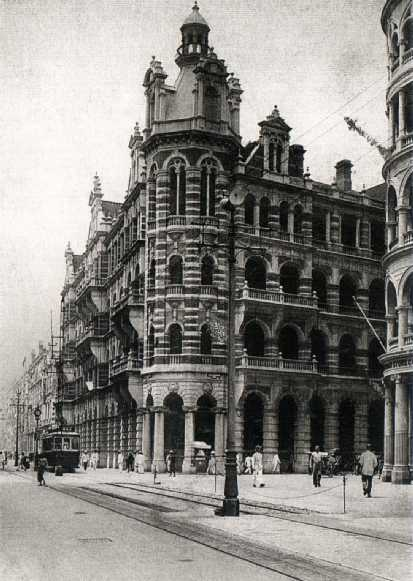
General Post Office circa 1911.

Merchants traded in Hong Kong on the two sides of Victoria Harbour as early as before the British possession in 1842. They complained about the absence of proper postal services and therefore the Postal Department was established.

The department was founded on 28 August 1841, but the first post office (known as 書信館 at that time), situated near the current site of St. John's Cathedral, opened on 12 November 1841. At first, its right to operation belonged to the Royal Mail, until its transfer to the Postmaster General on 1 May 1860.

On 8 December 1862, the office issued the first set of Hong Kong postal stamps. Before this time, only British troops in Hong Kong could use British stamps, while other local residents did not have access to British stamps. Until the handover of Hong Kong to China in 1997, mail for British forces serving in the then-colony used the British Forces Post Office number, BFPO 1.

The office introduced automated mail sorting in 1989, and machines were installed in the General Post Office.

There is no post code system in Hong Kong, although one has been under consideration since 2000.

Since August 1995, the office has operated as a trading fund and the full title of the head of the Office became "Postmaster General and general manager of the Post Office Trading Fund" (Chinese: 香港郵政署長兼郵政署營運基金總經理).

== Postal history ==
During the colonial era, Hong Kong produced postage stamps simply bearing the name Hong Kong, printed alongside the likenesses (in profile) of the reigning monarchs of the United Kingdom, or royal symbols (for example, "EIIR").

Since Hong Kong's transfer of sovereignty to China in 1997, stamps issued have borne the name "Hong Kong, China". British Hong Kong postage stamps are no longer valid for prepayment of postage and cannot be repurchased by the Post Office.

== Post offices ==
As of 2023, Hongkong Post operates 122 post offices (including 3 mobile post offices) throughout Hong Kong. The detailed locations and opening hours of the post offices are on the Hongkong Post website.

== iPostal Kiosk ==
In mid-2021, Hongkong Post launched iPostal Kisok which offers an automated posting service and enables the public to post mail, purchase postage label and make postage enquiry round-the clock. As of July 2023, there are 23 kiosks located across the city.

== Post boxes ==
Hong Kong imported post-boxes from the UK until the practice was discontinued in the 1980s. Before 1997, the post boxes were painted red, as in the United Kingdom, and were engraved with the royal cypher – for example, "EIIR" to represent Queen Elizabeth II. According to fans of Hong Kong's history, featuring the regal insignia on many of the George V and George VI post boxes in Hong Kong are unique as they are different in design from other British post boxes in the world. Since the transfer of sovereignty to China in 1997, the livery of the boxes became green, and were adorned with the new Hongkong Post logo.

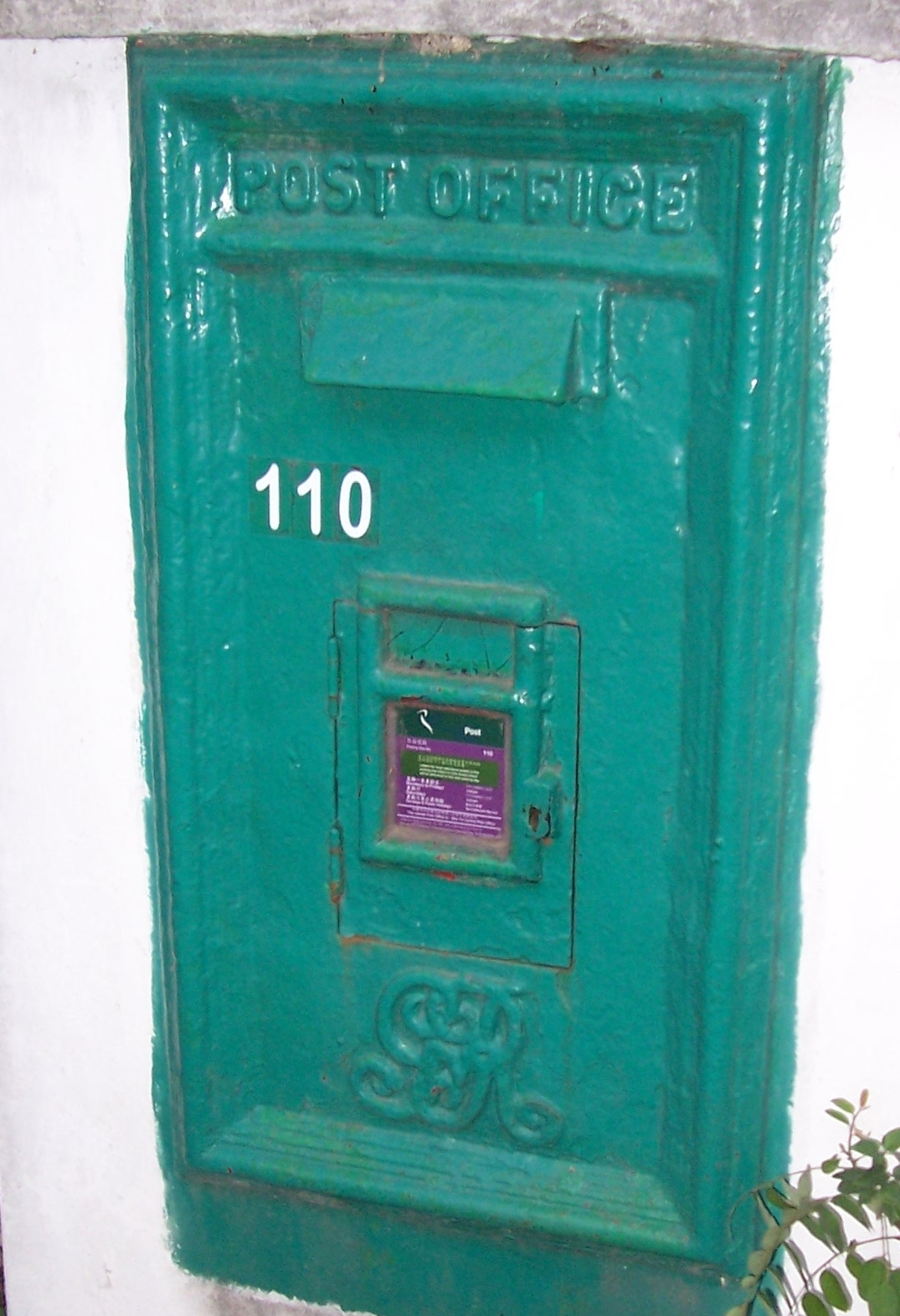
HongKong Post box bearing insignia of King George V, made during the colonial era, but painted in green from red after 1997

As of October 2015, there are 1,148 free-standing post-boxes in Hong Kong; only 59 colonial post boxes bearing the royal insignia were still in service. In late 2014 Hongkong Post reaffirmed its policy that the remaining 59 colonial-era post boxes would only be replaced if they were seriously damaged or no longer meet the demand of its customers.

=== Controversy ===
This department of government said in March 2015 that it was considering covering up the regal insignia on these post boxes, on grounds that it was "not desirable to have postboxes that show various royal cyphers from different British reigns" and to "avoid confusion". Controversy ignited in September upon confirmation that royal cyphers would be covered up by fixing metal plates on all but seven of the historical post boxes. The decision was decried by the Conservancy Association, the Mailboxes Searching Team, and activists opposed to the push of pro-Beijing politicians to "de-colonialise" Hong Kong. According to legislator Claudia Mo of the Civic Party, senior HK Post officials she talked with affirmed that the order to obscure regal insignia on the 59 colonial post boxes came from the Commerce and Economic Development Bureau (CEDB), which Mo said pointed to a political and not administrative decision.

== Services ==
=== Post ===
In addition to making its income from traditional postal delivery, Hongkong Post also sells philatelic products, and is used by the Government and utility companies to accept payment from customers.

=== Philately ===
Hongkong Post Stamps was a division set up in 1974, charged with promoting and popularising stamp collecting, to meet the ever-increasing demand for Hong Kong stamps by collectors. The division conducts three main areas of work:

- stamp product design and production
- fulfilment and advance ordering service
- philatelic marketing.

Owing to the territory's conservative stamp-issuing policy, stamp collecting in Hong Kong is a popular hobby. Different types of attractively designed stamp products are also popular with stamp collectors around the world.

=== Root certificate ===
Since 2000, Hongkong Post is a recognized root certificate authority and issues digital certificates under the trade name "e-Cert".

=== Other ===
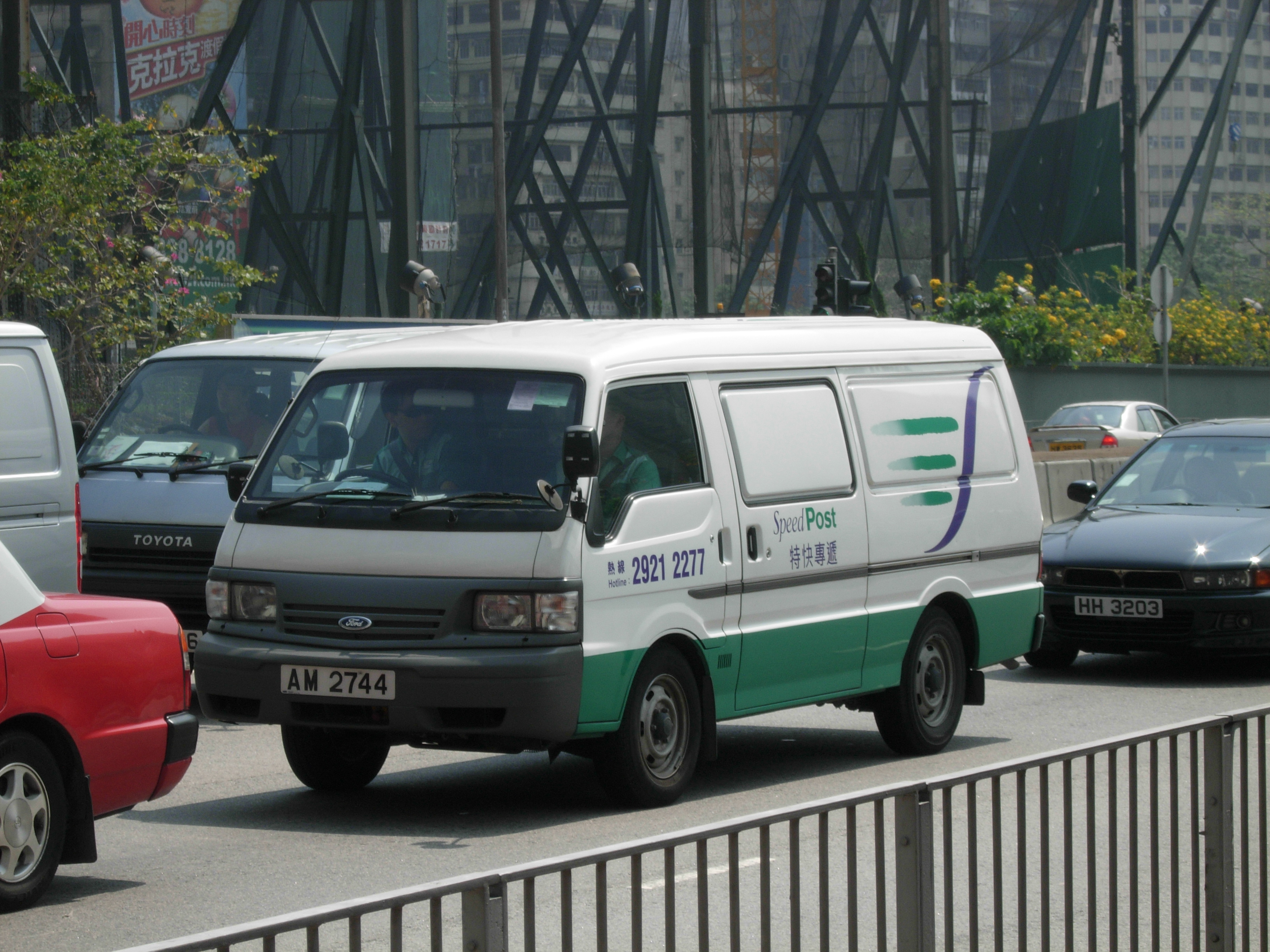
A SpeedPost delivery van

Hongkong Post also provides services listed below:

- Local Courier Post
- Speedpost
- Periodicals/Circular/Direct mail services
- e-Post
- e-Cert (Electronic Certificate for e-commerce)
- e-Business
- Franking machine
- Postal remittance service (to Canada, Mainland China, Indonesia, Japan, Nepal and the Philippines)
- Electronic remittance service (through Western Union)
- PayThruPost (Bill payment)
- Logistics, etc.

== Incidents ==
- In 2005, newspapers revealed the presence of pinhole cameras in Cheung Sha Wan Post Office, and this was perceived as a violation of people's privacy. Hongkong Post explained that the cameras were necessary for facilitating police investigations into several suspected theft cases.
- In March 2007, two postal staff lost three bags of mail, destined for Wan Chai and the Eastern District, in the management offices of Hongkong Post buildings. Although Hongkong Post eventually found one of the lost bags, 400 letters were reportedly lost.
- In December 2019, Hongkong Post made a notable announcement regarding a modification to one of its new stamp designs. The original design featured black-clad children and the Hongkong Post stated the changes were solely made for aesthetic reasons. But online commentators argued that this change was likely an attempt to avoid any resemblance between black-clad children with anti-government protesters at the time.
- As the demand for delivery services during the coronavirus pandemic surged since November 2020, scammers have cheated more than 100 Hongkongers out of HKD $2.2 million through phishing text messages and emails claiming to be from Hongkong Post.

== Achievements ==
- Winner of the 2005 "Hong Kong Awards for Industries – Productivity and Quality Award" for achievement in productivity enhancement and total quality management.
- Winner of the Caring Organisation Logo 2005/06 by the Hong Kong Council of Social Service.
- Winner of the Gold Level Certification in the Universal Postal Union EMS Cooperative Audit and Measurement Programme 2005.
- Winner of the Web Care Award 2005 – Gold Prize from Internet Professional Association.
- Guinness World Record holder for the largest stamp mosaic.

== List of Postmasters-General ==
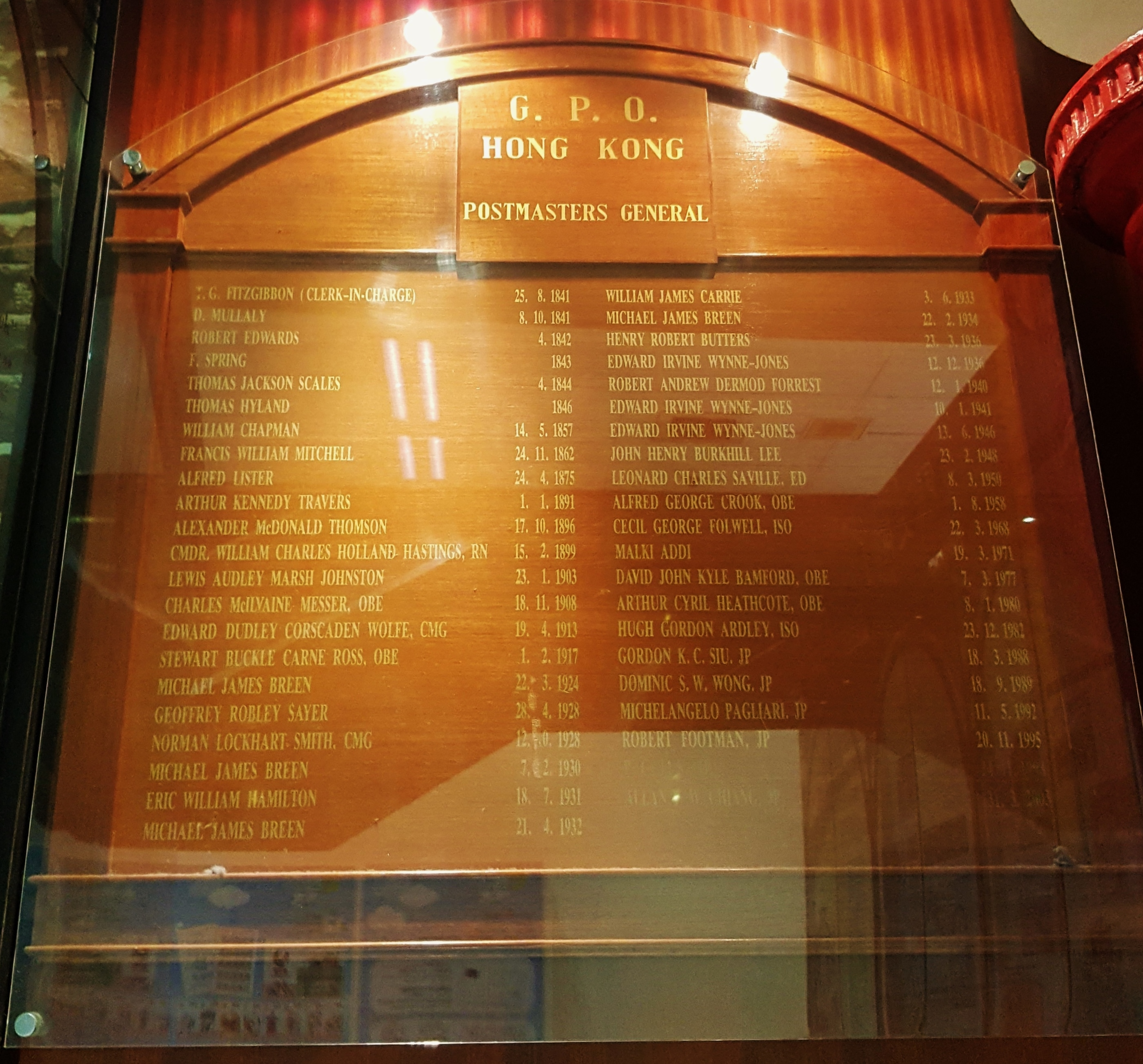
A tablet displayed inside the General Post Office, Hong Kong, showing a list of the Postmasters General of Hong Kong between 1841 and 2003

#	Name	Date of Appointment	Remarks
1	T. G. Fitzgibbon	25 August 1841	Clerk-in-Charge
2	D. Mullaly	8 October 1841	
3	Robert Edwards	April 1842	
4	F. Spring	1843	
5	Thomas Jackson Scales	April 1844	
6	Thomas Hyland (海蘭)	1846	
7	William Chapman	14 May 1857	
8	Francis William Mitchell (蔑祖)	24 November 1862	
9	Alfred Lister (李士達)	24 April 1875	
10	Arthur Kennedy Travers (剌花士)	1 January 1891	
11	Alexander MacDonald Thomson (譚臣)	17 October 1896	
12	Cmdr. William Charles Holland Hastings (夏士廷)	15 February 1899	Died in office
13	Lewis Audley Marsh Johnston (尊士頓)	23 January 1903	Died in office
14	Charles McIlvaine Messer (馬沙)	18 November 1908	
15	Edward Dudley Corscaden Wolfe (胡樂甫)	19 April 1913	
16	Stewart Buckle Carne Ross (羅士)	1 February 1917	
17	Michael James Breen (巴連)	22 March 1924	
18	Geoffrey Robley Sayer (佘義)	28 April 1928	
19	Norman Lockhart Smith (史美)	12 October 1928	
(17)	Michael James Breen (巴連)	7 February 1930	Second time
20	Eric William Hamilton (韓美頓)	18 July 1931	
(17)	Michael James Breen (巴連)	21 April 1932	Third time
21	William James Carrie (嘉利)	3 June 1933	
(17)	Michael James Breen (巴連)	22 February 1934	Fourth time
22	Henry Robert Butters (畢打士)	23 March 1936	
23	Edward Irvine Wynne-Jones (榮鐘士)	12 December 1936	
24	Robert Andrew Dermod Forrest (富勵士)	12 January 1940	
(23)	Edward Irvine Wynne-Jones (榮鐘士)	10 January 1941	Second time
	Hong Kong under Japanese occupation from 25 December 1941 to 15 August 1945		
(23)	Edward Irvine Wynne-Jones< (榮鐘士)	13 June 1946	Third time
25	John Henry Burkill Lee (李佐安)	23 February 1948	
26	Leonard Charles Saville (沙惠予)	8 March 1950	
27	Alfred George Crook (高旭)	1 August 1958	
28	Cecil George Folwell (符偉略)	22 March 1968	
29	Malki Addi (魏達賢)	19 March 1971	First non-European
30	David John Kyle Bamford (潘富達)	7 March 1977	
31	Arthur Cyril Heathcote (許富國)	8 January 1980	
32	Hugh Gordon Ardley (歐德理)	23 December 1982	
33	Gordon K. C. Siu (蕭炯柱)	18 March 1988	First ethnic Chinese
34	Dominic S. W. Wong (黃星華)	18 September 1989	
35	Michelangelo Pagliari (柏景年)	11 May 1992	
36	Robert Footman (霍文)	20 November 1995	Last expatriate prior to the handover
37	Luk Ping-chuen (陸炳泉)	24 November 1998	
38	Allan Chiang Yam-wang (蔣任宏)	31 March 2003	
39	Tam Wing-pong (譚榮邦)	10 July 2006	
40	Clement Cheung Wan-ching (張雲正)	14 September 2009	
41	Jessie Ting Yip Yin-mei (丁葉燕薇)	3 October 2011	First female
42	Gordon Leung Chung-tai (梁松泰)	10 July 2017	
43	Cathy Chu Man-ling (朱曼鈴)	9 September 2019	
44	Leonia Tai Shuk-yiu (戴淑嬈)	2 September 2021	

== Gallery ==
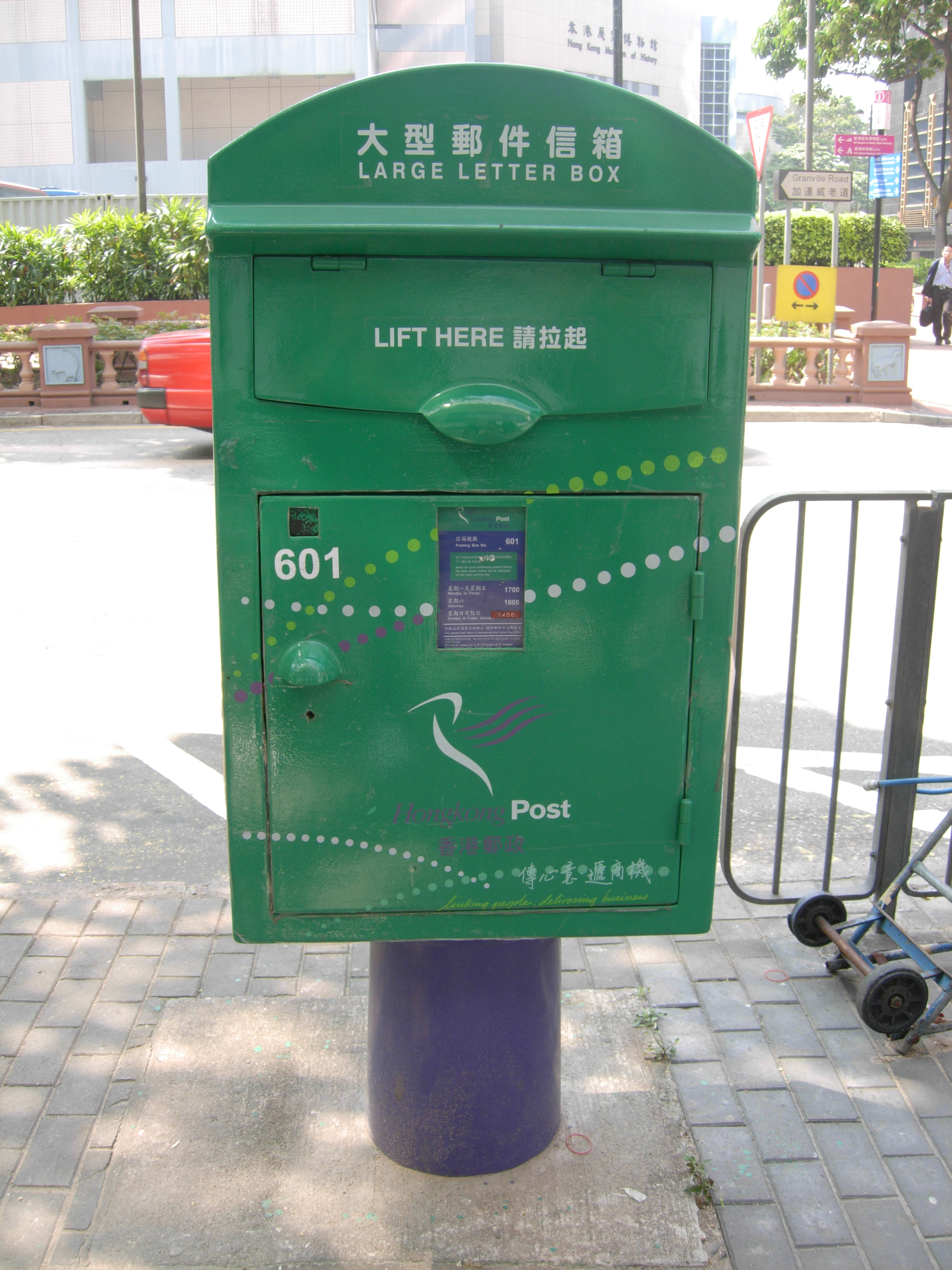
A large letter box found at Tsim Sha Tsui

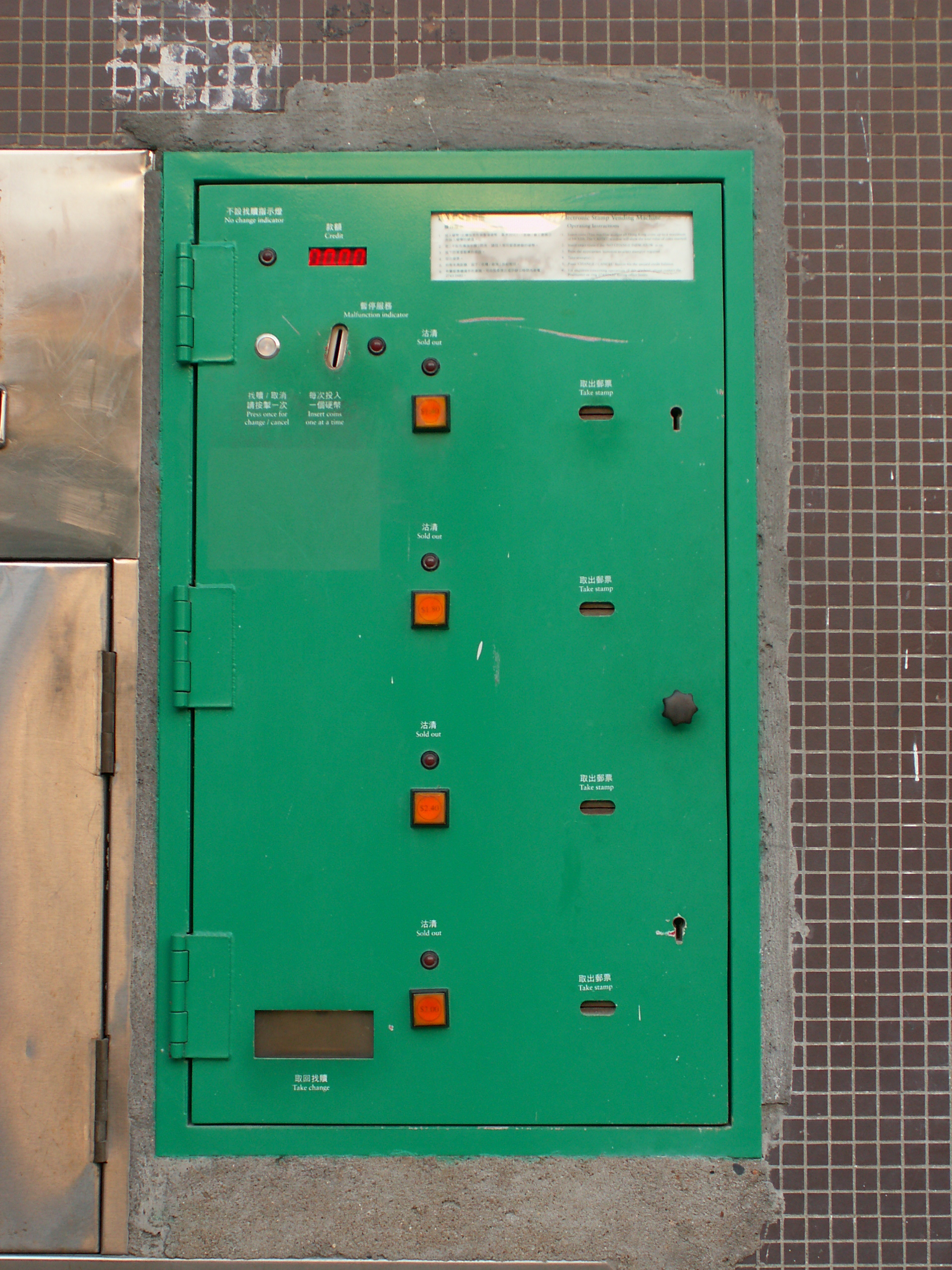
An ordinary stamp vending machine located at a post office

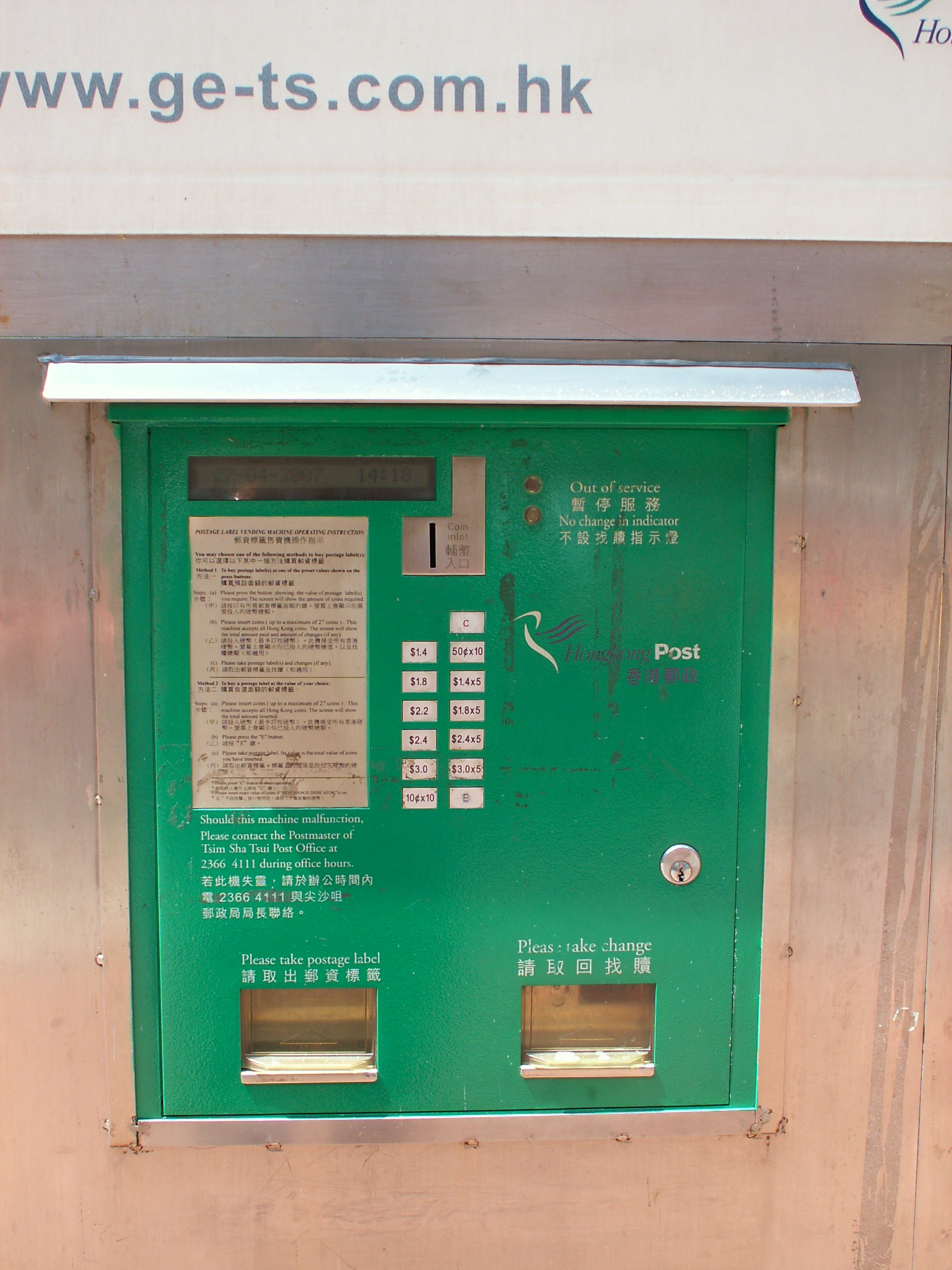
A postage label vending machine located at Tsim Sha Tsui Post Office. Postage labels are instantly-printed stamps with customisable or pre-set postage fees. It was discontinued and then removed in summer 2008.

== See also ==
- Chunghwa Post
- China Post
- Correios de Macau
- List of postal services abroad
- List of Hong Kong companies
- Royal Mail – operated in Hong Kong from 1841 to 1870
