= Christine Choi =

Hong Kong politician (born 1966)

The Honourable Christine Choi JP
- 蔡若蓮
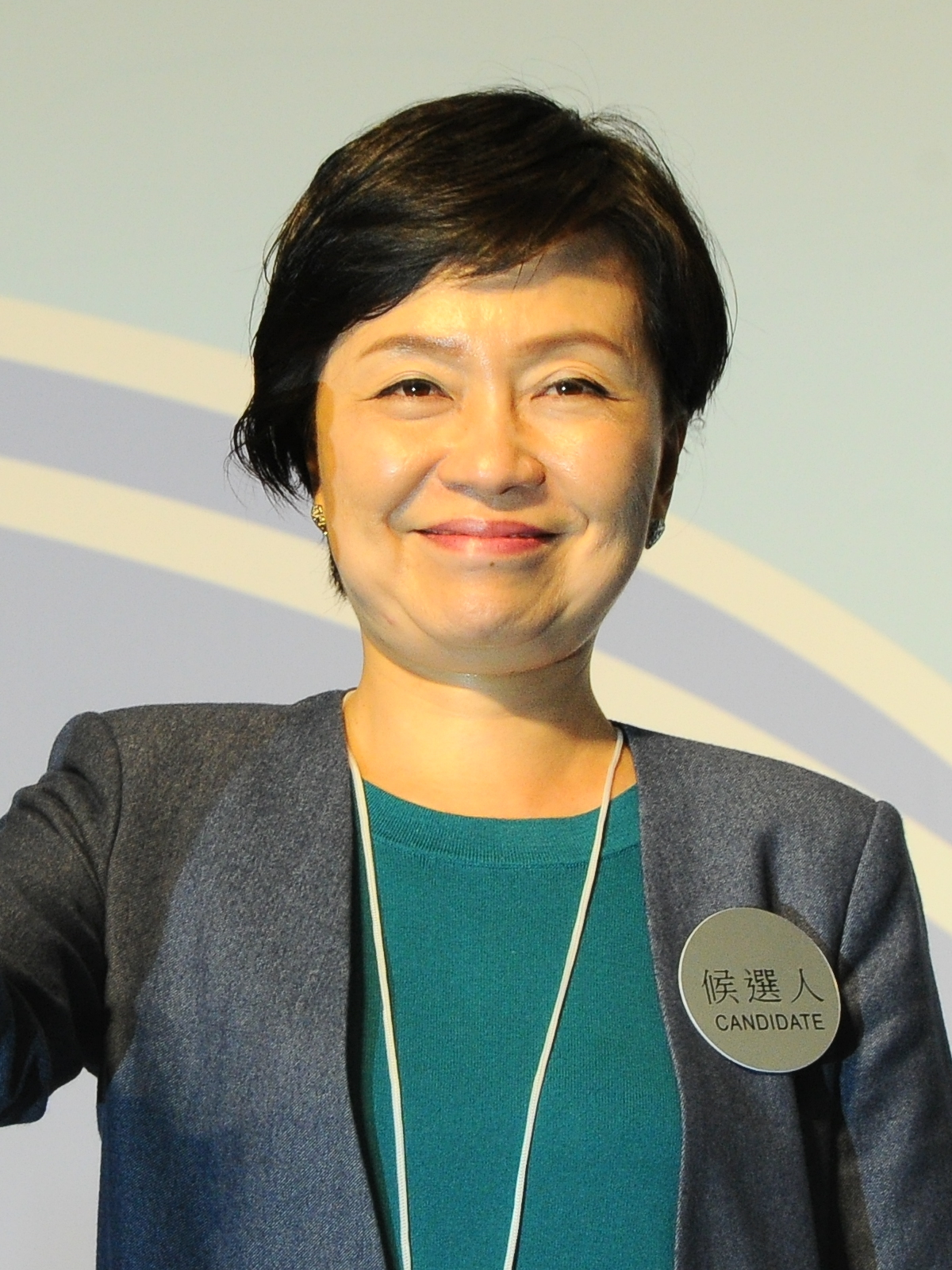
- Choi in 2016

Secretary for Education
- Incumbent
- Assumed office 1 July 2022
- Preceded by: Kevin Yeung

Under Secretary for Education
- In office 2 August 2017 – 30 June 2022
- Preceded by: Kevin Yeung
- Succeeded by: Jeff Sze Chun-fai

Personal details
- Born: 26 September 1966 (age 60) British Hong Kong
- Spouse: Poon Hei-yan (m. 1990)
- Children: 2 sons, including Peter Choi (died in 2017)
- Education: Hong Kong Baptist University (BA, MA); Chinese University of Hong Kong (MA, MEd, Ed.D.)
- Website: Christine Choi on Facebook

Christine Choi Yuk-lin (Chinese: 蔡若蓮; born 29 September 1966), is the current Secretary for Education in Hong Kong, formerly the principal of Fukien Secondary School (Siu Sai Wan) and vice-chairlady of Hong Kong Federation of Education Workers.

Choi ran in two elections in 2016 but was defeated in both. She was also appointed government committee member. Her negative remarks on Cantonese, the mother language of Hongkongers, was slammed by some critics.

== Early career ==
Choi graduated from Workers' Children Secondary School (Primary Section) (旺角勞工子弟學校小學部) in 1979, and Christian Alliance College in 1985. After graduating with a bachelor's in Hong Kong Baptist University (HKBU), Choi continued her academic path in the Chinese University of Hong Kong (CUHK) for studying education and linguistics, and in HKBU for Chinese language and literature.

After becoming an educational worker, Choi worked as teacher in various schools and as visiting professor for three universities in China, and later joined the Education Bureau. While in the Bureau, Choi called for the Chinese professionals to station in Hong Kong schools to promote Mandarin. In September 2013, Choi was appointed the principal of Fukien Secondary School (Siu Sai Wan).

Choi was also the vice-chairlady of Hong Kong Federation of Education Workers (HKFEW), a pro-Beijing union, while writing in Ta Kung Pao, a newspaper some described as the Beijing mouthpiece, and other newspaper commenting on educational issues.

== Political career ==
=== Defeat in elections ===
In June 2016, Choi announced to run as an independent candidate in the legislative election through the education constituency. She slammed both then-Education Secretary Eddie Ng and pan-democracy MP for education constituency Ip Kin-yuen for doing nothing. Her election campaign was marred by law-breaking accusation and was probed by the police for "technical mistakes". Choi was defeated after receiving 28% of votes.

Later that year in November, Choi ran in the Election Committee election which would select the Chief Executive. While once again defeated with 23% of votes only, she received second most votes amongst the pro-Beijing candidates.

=== Education Undersecretary ===
In June 2017, media reported Choi could be appointed the Under Secretary for Education. Her pro-Beijing background was questioned while pro-democracy camp and other critics said her election defeats marked her unpopularity. Politihk Social Strategic and other pro-Beijing organisations, on the other hand, supported the appointment for "depoliticising" education. The appointment was later announced by the Government in August 2017, confirming the reports. She therefore resigned as secondary school principal and vice-chairmanship of HKFEW.

=== Education Secretary ===
Choi was promoted to the Education Secretary on 1 July 2022 succeeding Kevin Yeung. Her appointment came after the overhaul of education environment, including the political test for new teachers and the introduction of patriotic education.

==== Language ====
Some expressed concern as she downplayed the role of Cantonese, the mother tongue of most Hongkongers, and emphasized on Mandarin. Choi once claimed in 2014 Cantonese is only a dialect of China and not an official language, spurring criticism and Choi eventually apologized. Within a month after assuming office, Choi advocated all schools in Hong Kong to teach Chinese Language in Mandarin instead of the mostly-used Cantonese, and said not speaking Mandarin is "disadvantageous". A survey done in August 2022 showed that over 70% of 18–29 year olds disagreed with teaching Mandarin in school.

==== National security ====
In August 2022, after more than 50% of CUHK students walked out of a national security seminar during their orientation, Choi said the students should treasure the learning opportunity.

In August 2022, Choi also said new public school teachers must pass a Basic Law test, including topics on national security.

In September 2022, a survey of teachers and principals showed that less than 30% of them considered the national security education program as effective.

==== COVID-19 ====
On 27 August 2022, Choi said that if COVID-19 cases continued to rise in Hong Kong, secondary schools may be banned from having full-day in-person classes. A day later, in response, school principals urged the government to maintain full-day classes, against Choi's idea. A medical expert, also serving as Chair Professor of Paediatrics at the University of Hong Kong, also said that face to face classes should not be suspended. Chu Kwok-keung, a lawmaker, also commented and said it would be "more dangerous" if schools were reduced from full-day classes to half-day classes.

Choi also said that schools would need to provide the Education Bureau with vaccination data on their students, but that the data would not be published.

An SCMP editorial discussed a recent trend of higher suicide rates among students in Hong Kong, and said experts believe the higher rate was linked to the city's pandemic measures, including school closures and moving to half-day classes instead of full-day classes.

In October 2022, SCMP reported that schools will have relaxed vaccine requirements, after the Education Bureau faced "pressure" from lawmakers, who criticized the government for not providing a timeline on resumption of normal school schedules.

In December 2022, Choi announced that full-day in-person classes would resume regardless of vaccination rates, dropping the previous requirement that 90% of students be vaccinated.

==== Teachers ====
In September 2022, Hong Kong Free Press reported that the latest government figures showed more than 4,000 teachers quit their jobs in the past school year, a 5-year high and 70% increase from the year before. Choi said that there was a "slightly higher" attrition rate. On 13 September 2022, the Hong Kong Association of the Heads of Secondary Schools appealed to Chief Executive John Lee, stating that there was serious brain drain of teachers, and that the situation is worse than previously reported.

In October 2022, Choi said that guidelines had been drafted that "will state clearly what teachers should and should not do, as well as some serious, unacceptable red lines." On 25 October 2022, Choi said that her department wanted to protect students from being bullied or insulted by teachers.

In December 2022, after guidelines were released that said teachers should protect national security, Choi was asked whether it would contribute to more teachers quitting their jobs; Choi responded by saying teachers quit for different reasons.

== Personal life ==
Choi, a Protestant, was married to Poon Hei-yan in 1990. They had two sons, including Peter Choi, the elder son.

On 7 September 2017, Peter Choi, aged 25 who had depression, committed suicide by jumping. The death soon turned into a political issue as two students in the Education University of Hong Kong celebrated his death, which the Chief Executive Carrie Lam strongly condemned. Similar celebratory remarks also appeared on the democracy wall of the City University of Hong Kong.

In July 2022, Choi attended a seminar on learning "the spirit of Xi's important speech."

== Electoral performances ==
2016 Legislative Council election: Education
Party	Candidate	Votes	%	±%
PTU	Ip Kin-yuen	45,984	71.69	–3.73
Nonpartisan (FEW)	Choi Yuk-lin	18,158	28.31	
Majority		27,826	43.38	
Total valid votes		64,142	100.00	
Rejected ballots		1,821		
Turnout		65,963	74.80	+4.17
Registered electors		88,185		
PTU hold		Swing		

== Footnotes ==
Political offices
Previous: Kevin Yeung	Secretary for Education; 1 July 2022 – present	Incumbent
Previous: Kevin Yeung	Under Secretary for Education; 2 August 2017 – 30 June 2022	Next: Jeff Sze
