= Kevin Yeung =

Hong Kong government official (born 1963)

Kevin Yeung JP
- 楊潤雄
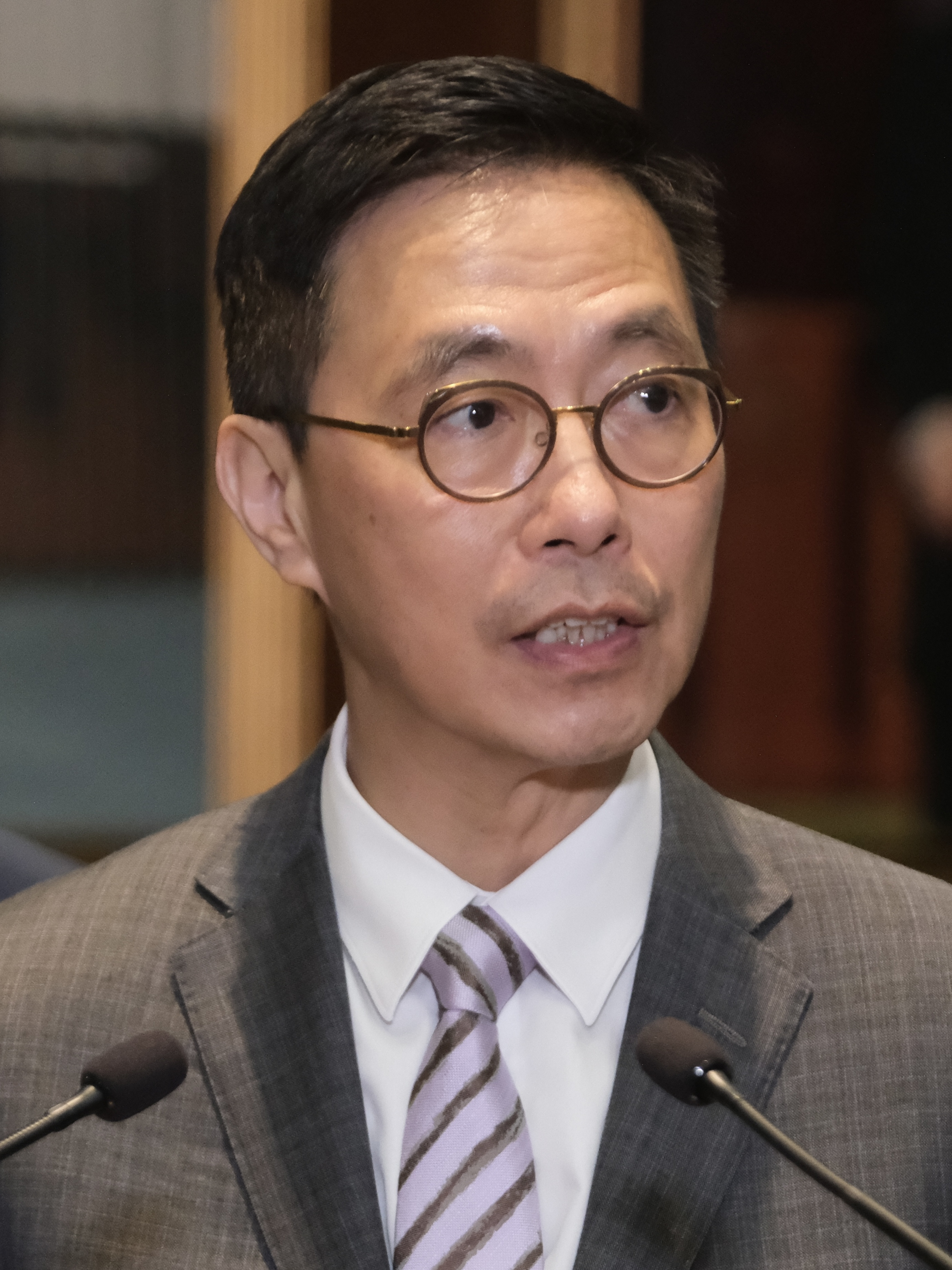
- Yeung in 2023

Secretary for Culture, Sports and Tourism
- In office 1 July 2022 – 5 December 2024
- Chief Executive: John Lee
- Chief Secretary: Eric Chan
- Preceded by: (New position)
- Succeeded by: Rosanna Law

Secretary for Education
- In office 1 July 2017 – 30 June 2022
- Chief Executive: Carrie Lam
- Preceded by: Eddie Ng
- Succeeded by: Christine Choi

Under Secretary for Education
- In office 1 July 2012 – 30 June 2017
- Chief Executive: Leung Chun-ying
- Preceded by: Kenneth Chan
- Succeeded by: Christine Choi

Personal details
- Born: January 26, 1963 (age 63) Hong Kong
- Education: Wah Yan College, Kowloon; University of Hong Kong; RMIT University

Kevin Yeung
- Traditional Chinese: 楊潤雄
- Simplified Chinese: 杨润雄
Transcriptions
Standard Mandarin
- Hanyu Pinyin: Yáng Rùnxióng
Yue: Cantonese
- Jyutping: joeng4 jeon6 hung4

Kevin Yeung Yun-hung (Chinese: 楊潤雄; born 26 January 1963) is a former Hong Kong government official who served as the Secretary for Culture, Sports and Tourism from 2022 to 2024.

He graduated from the University of Hong Kong with a Bachelor of Social Sciences and a Master of Business Administration degree from the Royal Melbourne Institute of Technology University in Australia. He worked as an accountant in the private sector for seven years before joining the Hong Kong government in 1992 as an administrative officer.

He served in various bureaux and departments, including more than four years as assistant to Secretary for Home Affairs Tsang Tak-sing. In 2010, he transferred to the Food and Health Bureau, and later served in the Home Affairs Bureau, the Kowloon City District Office, and the Hong Kong Economic and Trade Office in Sydney. He was promoted to Administrative Officer Staff Grade C in 2004. In November 2012, he was appointed Under Secretary for Education.

== Secretary for Education ==
In July 2017, he became the Secretary for Education in Chief Executive Carrie Lam's administration.

In his two senior Education Bureau roles, Yeung has frequently been criticised for his positions on contentious education matters, including: his support for Mandarin language teaching over Cantonese, his mother tongue; calling for teachers to dissuade students from voicing support for the 2019–20 Hong Kong protests and that any school principal who supports a teacher under investigation may be disqualified; and speedy criticism of a question in the 2020 Hong Kong Diploma of Secondary Education Examination that asked if Japan "did more good than harm to China" between 1900 and 1945, calling it "problematic" and "biased".

In June 2020, he wrote to school principals urging them to discipline students who took part in a union-organised referendum on whether to boycott classes as a protest against China's imposition of national security legislation through amending an annex to the Basic Law, calling it a "meaningless ballot". His letter also told principals to ensure that students did not shout slogans, form human chains, put up posters, or even sing songs containing political messages.

In July 2020, in reference to Glory to Hong Kong, he wrote, "No one, including students, should play, sing, and broadcast songs which contain political messages or hold any activities to express their political stance" despite the fact that he sent his own son and daughter to attend university in Australia, where freedom of political communication is an implied right in the constitution.

In late August 2020, Kevin Yeung said that "separation of powers" should be removed from Liberal Studies textbooks. This statement had a snowball effect, as a day later, Carrie Lam expressed "full support" for that opinion. A week later, both the Liaison Office and Hong Kong and Macao Affairs Office released statements, saying that separation of powers does not exist in Hong Kong. In addition, Teresa Cheng reiterated the position and said that separation of powers "has no place" in Hong Kong.

In October 2020, Yeung announced that details of certain investigations into teachers would be published online to inform the public and educators of what the government deems unacceptable. Additionally, Yeung said that if Hong Kong independence is discussed in schools, then teachers must make the students conclude that the idea is not feasible.

In November 2020, Yeung said that his department would seek legal authority for more extensive punishments against teachers, including the suspension of their teaching licenses, the withholding or deduction of their salaries, and other penalties. In regards to classroom material that may be "problematic", such as discussions on Hong Kong independence, Yeung said that teachers "should report the matter to their supervisors so amendments could be made", and that if the teachers "stay silent, they should be held responsible".

Also in November 2020, Yeung announced changes to the liberal studies curriculum in Hong Kong, including the vetting of all textbooks to remove material which pro-Beijing figures have said were biased against the government. Some educators noted that some of Yeung's changes, such as moving the grading system to pass/fail, ran contrary to recommendations made by a task force that had reviewed the subject for three years.

In December 2020, Yeung said that ongoing current affairs should not be taught in liberal studies classrooms.

In February 2021, Yeung announced changes to the education system, and said that schools and teachers that fail to report breaches of the National Security Law to the police could be held responsible. Notices to teachers explained that teachers should educate students as young as 6 years old about the national security law. Yeung also reiterated that schools are not a place to express political views and said that the new rules would not impact rights or freedom of speech for students. Also, Yeung said that even if pupils were outside of campus and form human chains, campus administrators still had the responsibility to prevent them from doing so. In response, Ip Kin-yuen, the vice-president of the Professional Teachers' Union, said that he was astounded to see the "vast scope" of the new rules as well as the lack of consultation with teachers before the rules were published.

In March 2021, Yeung revealed that all primary and secondary schools in Hong Kong would be given 48 copies of "My Home is in China," a book designed to boost mainland Chinese identity in students. In addition, Yeung revealed that new teachers in Hong Kong would have to undergo a mandatory study tour in mainland China as part of their training so they could "understand the educational development in mainland and the country's achievements through their personal experience."

In October 2021, Yeung said that teachers at private schools may be forced to take a test on the Basic Law.

In December 2021, Yeung announced that the Education Bureau had installed around 20 flagpoles in public schools, to facilitate mandatory flag-raising ceremonies of the PRC flag. Yeung claimed that the flag-raising would improve students' recognition of their country and their identity as Chinese nationals.

== Secretary for Culture, Sports and Tourism ==
In November 2023, Yeung was criticized by Hong Kong legislative council members over the Kai Tak Cruise Terminal, with Starry Lee saying "‘I think you have handled the entire cruise terminal and the facilities around it quite poorly since you took office."

In December 2023, Yeung asked the public to not overreact to the potential replacement of the Hong Kong Science Museum with a museum celebrating China's accomplishments. An SCMP editorial later stated "The government should avoid giving the impression that the promotion of national achievement is done at the expense of local culture."

=== Cancelled events ===
In September 2022, the Hong Kong Association of Athletics Affiliates, organizer of the Standard Chartered Hong Kong Marathon 2022 issued an ultimatum to the government, stating that they would have to cancel the marathon if there were no government approval by 16 September 2022. When the organizer received no reply from the government by that date, it canceled the event, and Yeung said he was shocked by the announcement, even though Yeung confirmed that the government had received the demand a week before the cancellation. Yeung claimed that the government had done its best to get the marathon approved.

On 17 September 2022, the 2023 16th World Dragon Boat Racing Championships announced that it would move the event from Hong Kong to Thailand due to quarantine measures. The Oxfam Trailwalker was also cancelled after the government declined to issue a permit for the event.

Other events that were cancelled include the Hong Kong Open badminton tournament, as well as the local leg of fencing's junior épée World Cup. The Hong Kong Badminton Association said that strict quarantine rules made it unviable to continue with the tournament.

On 27 November 2024, singer Pong Nan's 20th debut anniversary concert organizer Sunchase Productions announced through Instagram that the show which scheduled next January had to be axed due to the venue booking was canceled by the West Kowloon Cultural District.

=== Poetry ===
In October 2022, Yeung claimed that the government has power to decide if literary works can be given awards, based on whether they follows laws such as the national security law. Yeung said that "the literary industry should not worry if they hold the 'right understandings to the country.'"

=== COVID-19 ===
In October 2022, Yeung admitted that the government's "0+3" measure for inbound travelers only created limited help to travel agencies. However, Yeung said that he wanted the public to keep complying with anti-COVID measures.

In January 2023, Yeung said that South Korea's flight curbs on travelers from China, Hong Kong, and Macau were not necessary, and said "In general, we want these [Covid] measures [to be] based on science. In the past few weeks, you can see that our situation, for example, the Covid figures have been decreasing, and we have been controlling the pandemic in Hong Kong in a very good manner. I think in the past, we have proved that our measures are very effective." A separate report from January 2023 listed Hong Kong as recently having the world's highest Covid-related deaths, per capita.

In May 2023, Yeung was tested positive for COVID-19.

=== Sports Commissioner ===
On 2 November 2022, the sports commissioner, Yeung Tak-keung said that "very few people" in the government administration are familiar with sports, and that authorities had not yet found a successor for him, as his term had ended. Yeung said that "They often don't know much about sports, nor can they think from the perspective of sports development."

=== Michelle Yeoh ===
In January 2023, Yeung congratulated Michelle Yeoh, a Malaysian national, and said she was a "Hong Kong actor."

In March 2023, Erena So debuted as an AV actress in Japan, becoming the first AV actress from Hong Kong in Japan. Some netizens created satirical posts mimicking an official press release based on Yeoh's. The Culture, Sports and Tourism Bureau responded that the press release was fake and contacted the police about the posts.

=== Glory to Hong Kong ===
In March 2023, Yeung said that the government would have "a serious attitude to deal with the matter in a strict manner" regarding the Hong Kong Ice Hockey Association (HKIHA) for failing to verify that the correct anthem was played instead of Glory to Hong Kong.

Political offices
Preceded by Kenneth Chen	Under Secretary for Education; 2012–2017	Succeeded by Christine Choi
Preceded by Eddie Ng	Secretary for Education; 2017–2022	Succeeded by Christine Choi
New title	Secretary for Culture, Sports and Tourism; 2022–2024	Succeeded by Rosanna Law
