= Mother-tongue education in Hong Kong =

Mother-tongue education in Hong Kong is the act of teaching in the native language of the pupils in a certain area of country, as opposed to teaching in a foreign language. The subject is especially important in regions where there is a foreign language that is highly prevalent for historical, political or economical reasons.

== History ==
Cantonese is the main language spoken in Hong Kong. Schools in Hong Kong follow a principle called "biliteracy and trilingualism," where students learn to read and write in both Chinese and English, while speaking Cantonese, English, and Mandarin. English was the exclusive language of instruction in Hong Kong's schools before 1997 because Hong Kong was a colony of the United Kingdom. The government revived teaching in Cantonese during the early 1980s, but by the end of 1994, only 20% of secondary schools had adopted Cantonese as the language medium of teaching. From the 1998–1999 school year, with direction from the government, 75% of schools began to use Cantonese in their classes.

== The revised Medium of Instruction policy (MOI) ==
According to the revised MOI policy, secondary schools were encouraged to adopt Chinese Medium of Instruction (CMI) teaching methods, starting in the 1998–99 school year. This introduction of CMI started in the secondary 1 intake of pupils, and progressed each year to a higher form at junior secondary levels. Not all school reacted to this suggestion however, because some schools remained using English as the medium of instruction. These English Medium-of-Instruction (EMI) schools had to comply with the following conditions:

1. Students were able to study in English
2. Teachers must be capable of teaching in English.
3. The school should have adequate supporting strategies.

Schools who implemented the CMI policy by 2000–01 were allowed to switch to English as the medium of instruction, as was the case for certain subjects in part of the secondary 4 and 5 classes. These schools also enjoyed the autonomy of deciding which language would be used in teaching secondary 6 and 7.

== Advantages of mother-tongue teaching ==
=== Effects on academic performance ===
Research suggests that mother-tongue teaching helps students learn in a more effective way, and they achieve a better academic performance in general.

A longitudinal study was carried out during the 1988–89 school year by the Education Commission, to examine the effects of the change of medium of instruction. Eleven Anglo-Chinese schools with more than half the subjects taught in Chinese were selected as the experimental group, and were matched with the control group who were in the English environment. A total number of 4543 students in secondary 1 partook in the experiment, and were tracked from secondary 1 to 3.

Students in the control group, who were in an English environment, were found to perform better in English than their counterparts. Their performance in Mathematics was 'ambiguous' because of the 'unequal ability distributions' among the experimental group, and the control group. Students in a Chinese language environment, on the other hand, showed a better performance in all other subjects, including Chinese, Science, History and Geography.

=== Effectiveness of teaching ===
Teaching in English poses a huge challenge to teachers. As revealed in the report of the 2014 Hong Kong Examinations and Assessment Authority (HKEAA) the overall performance of teachers in English Language was unsatisfactory. The proficiency attainment rates in the writing and speaking papers were 53% and 52% respectively. The lack of proficiency in English limits teachers from expressing their ideas clearly. Mother-tongue teaching, on the other hand, enables teachers to elaborate and explain concepts in a clearer way, which in turn, boosts the effectiveness of teaching.

=== Effectiveness of acquisition of knowledge ===
Teaching in Chinese, the mother-tongue to locals in Hong Kong, is conducive in acquiring knowledge. In general, students possess a greater ability in Chinese than in English: The primary 6 students are capable of writing 300-word articles in Chinese, whereas they can only make simple sentences in English. This is because of their limited English vocabulary of approximately 1000 words. As a direct result of this, students encounter less difficulty in understanding the materials that are taught in their mother-tongue language, because there are less constraints owing to their broader Chinese vocabulary bank.

In addition, teaching in mother-tongue boosts a student's motivation for learning. When they are able to understand the concepts they are taught with ease, students are motivated and willing to pay extra attention in lessons. This in turn enhances the effectiveness of language acquisition.

== Criticism and concerns ==
Teaching mother-tongue cuts down the level of exposure to English. It has been suggested that while students can learn more effectively about non-language subjects, the negative impact on performance in English Language is inevitable. According to The Five Principles of Effective Second Language Vocabulary Instruction by Barcroft, presenting new words frequently and repeatedly during lessons is one of the keys to success in learning a second language. Likewise, in mother-tongue teaching, students are less exposed to English, so they acquire English as a second language less effectively.

Another concern is the status of English as an international language. Some have argued that reduced exposure to English as well as learning academic subjects in native language will lessen students' edge and competence in the global market.

== Fine-tuning of mother-tongue teaching ==
In response to the controversy of students' performance in English, there is some fine-tuning in the revised MOI policy. Under the fine-tuned policy, total lesson time in English has been increased in order to improve the English learning environment for students in CMI schools. EMI may be adopted in non-language subjects up to a maximum of two subjects, taking into consideration the language abilities of students. Furthermore, the classification of CMI and EMI schools has been cancelled. Schools are now allowed to choose to adopt EMI for one or more subjects, or based on the ability of students in the extra-learning activities. The arrangements made in schools have become more diversified and flexible.

== See also ==
- Mother-Tongue
- Hong Kong Education Bureau
