= Malki Issa Addi =

First non-European Postmaster General of Hong Kong (1917–1992)

Malki Addi 魏達賢

Postmaster General of Hong Kong
- In office March 1971 – March 1977
- Preceded by: C. G. Folwell
- Succeeded by: D. J. K. Bamford

Personal details
- Born: 1 March 1917 Midyat, Mardin Province, Ottoman Empire
- Died: March 29, 1992 (aged 75) Orange County, California, US
- Occupation: Postal official

Malki Issa Addi (1 March 1917 – 29 March 1992) was a British colonial postal official of Turkish origin who served as the Postmaster General of Hong Kong from March 1971 to March 1977.

During his tenure, Addi oversaw the relocation of the General Post Office from Pedder Street in Central, Hong Kong, which led to the completion and opening of the new General Post Office on newly reclaimed land at Connaught Place in 1976, while the old, classical-style General Post Office built in 1911 was demolished in the same year. In addition, he strove to bring innovations to Hong Kong's postal services, which included launching the Speedpost service in 1973—making Hong Kong the first place outside the United Kingdom and the United States to do so—and introducing the Accelerated Surface Post (ASP) service in 1974. The Hong Kong Philatelic Bureau under the Post Office was also established under his leadership in 1975.

The greatest controversy during Addi's tenure as Postmaster General was his involvement in the Hong Kong Government's submission of the Post Office Bill 1975 to the Legislative Council in February 1975, which attempted to completely ban air freight forwarders and courier companies from delivering commercial documents and letters. However, the bill quickly faced strong resistance from the business sector, led primarily by the American Chamber of Commerce in Hong Kong and the Hong Kong General Chamber of Commerce, preventing the bill from being submitted for its third reading in March as scheduled. Subsequently, as the Hong Kong government suspended the legislative work, the controversy surrounding the bill temporarily subsided. However, in September 1976, the government proposed resubmitting the revised bill to the Legislative Council in October, provoking another business backlash. The "Ad Hoc Committee against the Post Office Bill" was formed to block the government's legislative efforts. Facing fierce criticism from the business community, the government ultimately took the rare step of announcing another postponement of the legislation on 21 October, meaning that the legislative attempt ended in failure.

Earlier in his career, Addi joined the Government of Mandatory Palestine in 1936 to work in postal services, and subsequently served in Nyasaland in Africa, the Federation of Rhodesia and Nyasaland, and the Crown Colony of North Borneo in Southeast Asia. He arrived in Hong Kong in 1959 to serve as Senior Postal Accountant, and was later promoted to Chief Postal Accountant in 1962 and Deputy Postmaster General in 1968. After retiring from the Hong Kong Government in 1977, Addi decided to emigrate with his family to California, United States, where he opened the Sunflower Travel agency, which he operated until his death in 1992.

== Early life ==
Malki Addi was born on 1 March 1917 in Midyat, Mardin Province, Ottoman Empire (the predecessor of Turkey) to Issa Addi and Elizabeth Khoury. Although Turkey was a predominantly Islamic country, Addi's family was Christian. In his youth, he was sent to Jerusalem, then part of Mandatory Palestine (the predecessor of Israel and Palestine), where he was educated at a church school, Bishop Gobat School.

== Colonial career ==
After graduating from secondary school in 1936, Addi joined the Government of Mandatory Palestine in the same year, working in a junior position in the Department of Posts and Telegraphs. Following the dissolution of Mandatory Palestine in 1948, he was transferred to the Palestine Accounts Clearance Office, temporarily established by the British Government in Cyprus, to assist in winding up the accounts of the former Mandatory Palestine government. Addi had acquired Palestinian citizenship during his residence in Palestine. After completing his work in Cyprus, he was granted naturalization as a British subject by the Home Office in November 1949. This enabled him to remain in the British government service, and in the same year, he was temporarily attached to the headquarters of the Colonial Office in London as a temporary civil servant.

In 1950, Addi was officially appointed by the Colonial Office as an Assistant Postmaster in Nyasaland (the predecessor of Malawi), Africa. He was subsequently promoted to Assistant Accountant in 1952 and Accountant in 1955. During his tenure, he was seconded to the Federation of Rhodesia and Nyasaland as Superintendent of Savings Bank from 1954 to 1956. In 1957, he was transferred to the colonial government of the Crown Colony of North Borneo, where he served as Accountant in the local Department of Posts and Telegraphs. Two years later, in 1959, he was further transferred to the Post Office under the Government of Hong Kong, where he was promoted to Senior Postal Accountant. During his service in Hong Kong, he was repeatedly promoted, including to Chief Postal Accountant in 1962, and to Deputy Postmaster General in 1968, succeeding C. G. Folwell, who was elevated to Postmaster General. During his tenure as Deputy Postmaster General, he acted as Postmaster General on several occasions and was appointed an Official Justice of the Peace (JP) by the Hong Kong Government in 1969.

== Postmaster General of Hong Kong ==
=== Relocation of the General Post Office ===
In March 1971, Addi succeeded C. G. Folwell as Postmaster General, after Folwell proceeded on pre-retirement leave. The position of Deputy Postmaster General was filled by D. J. K. Bamford, who was brought in from the East African Posts and Telecommunications Administration. As Postmaster General, he also concurrently held several related public offices, including Director of Telecommunications, Chairman of the Hong Kong Communications Board, Chairman of the Stamp Advisory Committee, Controller of Telephone Allocations, as well as a member of the Advisory Committee on Telephone Services and the Television Advisory Board.

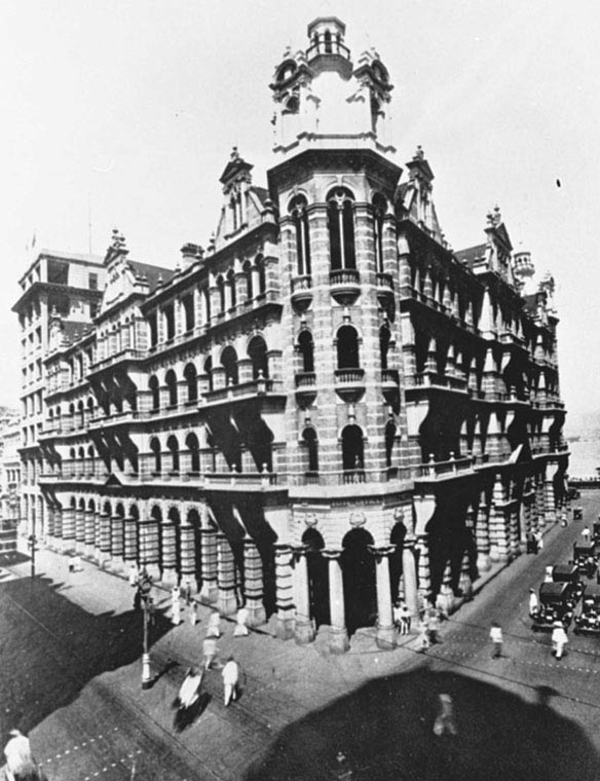
The old General Post Office located at Pedder Street in Central, originally built in 1911, was demolished in 1976

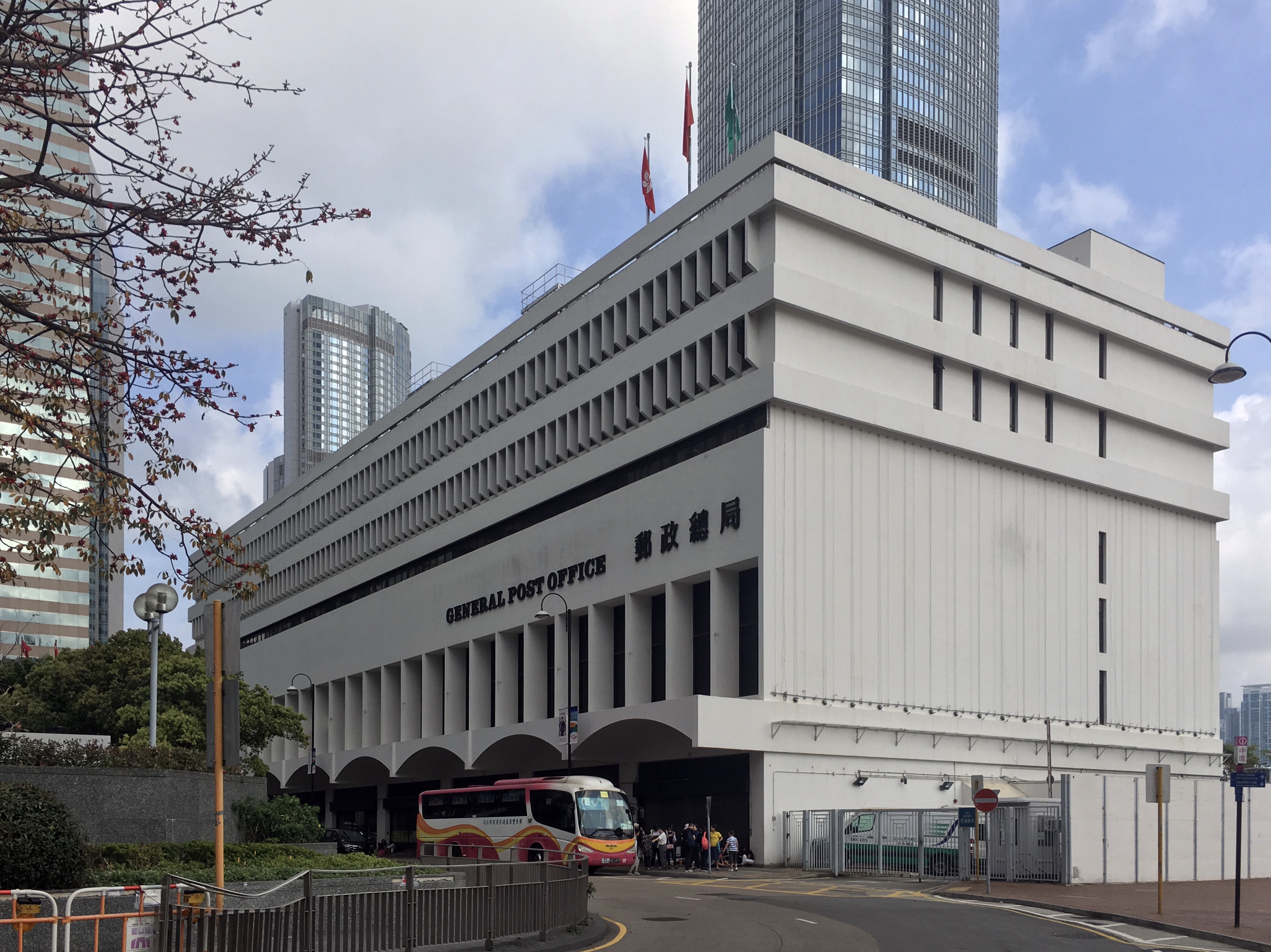
It was replaced by the new General Post Office on newly reclaimed land at Connaught Place in Central, completed and opened in the same year

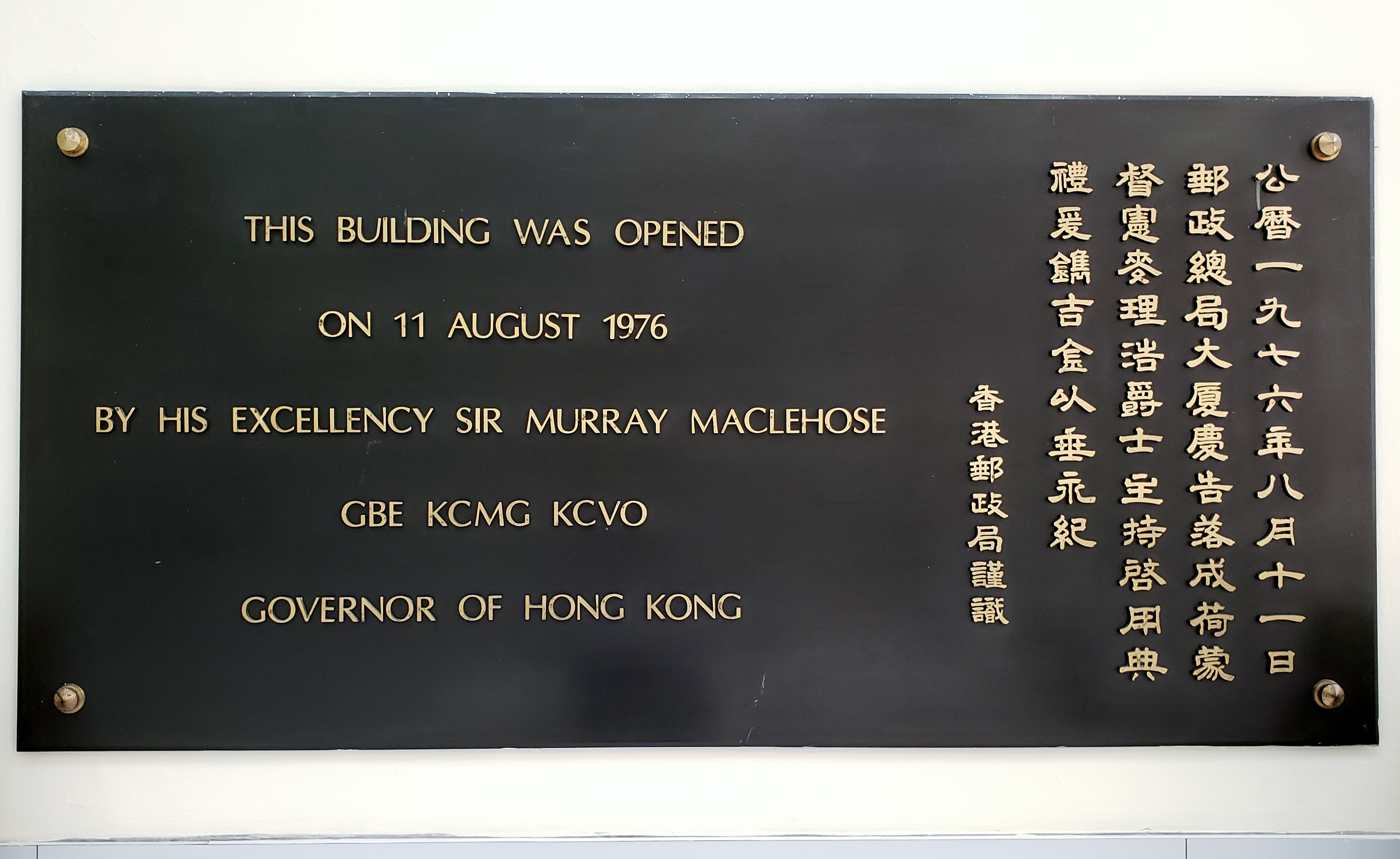
The new General Post Office was officially opened on 11 August 1976 by the Governor of Hong Kong, Sir Murray MacLehose

During Addi's tenure, public demand for postal services continued to rise. In terms of mail volume alone, the total number of items handled by the Post Office increased from 240 million in 1971 to 305 million in 1977; during the same period, the number of post offices grew from 59 to 73. While postal services were expanding, the future of the General Post Office on Pedder Street in Central became a subject of public discussion. Although the building, completed in 1911, had a classical design, its interior had fallen into disrepair and its structure had deteriorated. It was difficult to make space for installing mechanized, large-scale mail sorting equipment, forcing the GPO to rely on traditional manual mail-handling methods. In an interview inside the General Post Office in 1973, Addi complained that the ceiling of the building's veranda was riddled with cracks, raising concerns that the building could collapse. Furthermore, whenever there was piling work at nearby construction sites, his office desk would vibrate constantly, leading him to remark, "...if the building survives all the recent piling work, it's just due to our good luck".

Against this background, the Hong Kong Government had decided as early as 1969 to build a brand new General Post Office on newly reclaimed land between the Central Star Ferry Pier and Blake Pier on the north shore of Hong Kong Island. However, it was not until Addi assumed office as Postmaster General in 1971 that the authorities formally commissioned the British Postal Consultancy Service under the British Post Office to conduct detailed studies and planning for the new GPO, as well as to investigate building a Colony Transit and Sorting Office at Hung Hom, Kowloon, on the opposite side of the harbor. To alleviate the urgent situation, Addi moved the inward parcel section of the GPO in early 1972 to a temporary building on the newly reclaimed land across Connaught Road Central, allowing the GPO to free up more space to concentrate on mail handling. At the same time, an enclosed overhead conveyor bridge spanning Connaught Road Central, which connected the GPO to the newly reclaimed land (popularly nicknamed the "Bridge on the River Kwai"), was fitted with a new conveyor system to facilitate the relocation.

After years of preparation, construction of the new General Post Office formally commenced in April 1973, and was completed in 1976. The opening ceremony was hosted by the then Governor of Hong Kong, Sir Murray MacLehose, on 11 August of that year. Following the decommissioning of the old GPO on Pedder Street, it was eventually demolished at the end of 1976. The site was redeveloped for commercial use into the 27-story World-Wide House, while the underground portion was used for the construction of the MTR Central station. On the other hand, the new General Post Office, located on the reclaimed land at Connaught Place, was a five-story building covering an area of over 150,000 square feet. Modern facilities inside the building included a mail bag conveyor chain system approximately 1,000 feet long, a conveyor system capable of delivering 45,000 letters per hour from the sorting section, and a stamp cancelling machine capable of sorting and postmarking 25,000 letters per hour. Additionally, the new building provided 12,400 PO boxes, nearly doubling the 6,700 boxes of the old building. Its architectural design adjacent to Victoria Harbour also allowed docked Royal Mail tenders to automatically load and unload mail. More than forty years after the opening of the new GPO, the Finance Committee of the Legislative Council passed funding in October 2018 to relocate the General Post Office next to the Central Mail Centre in Kowloon Bay, with the original site slated for commercial and recreational redevelopment, and demolition expected to begin in 2023.

As for the Colony Transit and Sorting Office studied during Addi's tenure, it was later renamed the International Mail Centre, though its construction plan was repeatedly delayed. It was not until 1975 that the Hong Kong Government launched the first phase of the project, with piling work officially beginning as late as November 1976. Located in Hung Hom, the International Mail Centre finally opened in June 1980, by which time Addi had already retired. To accommodate the construction of the MTR Corporation's Shatin to Central Link, the centre was officially closed in March 2014 and replaced by the newly completed Central Mail Centre in Kowloon Bay.

=== 1975 Post Office Bill ===
Another major controversy handled by Addi during his tenure was his involvement in the legislative work for the Post Office Bill 1975, which attempted to completely ban courier companies from delivering commercial documents and letters. For a long time, postal services in Hong Kong were mainly regulated by the Post Office Ordinance (Chapter 98 of the Laws of Hong Kong), which was enacted in 1926 and drafted primarily with reference to the United Kingdom's Post Office Act 1908. Although the ordinance granted the Postmaster General a monopoly over the delivery of letters, it also specified certain exceptions. For instance, private messengers employed to deliver letters concerning the sender or the recipient were not restricted by the Postmaster General's monopoly. Due to these exceptional clauses and the lack of a clear definition for "letter" in the legislation, some air freight forwarders and courier companies took advantage of the legal grey area to accept commercial documents and letters for express delivery, in addition to providing normal and legal express parcel and freight services. At the same time, the delivery efficiency of the postal authorities often fell short of that of courier companies, making many businesses happy to use courier services.

Addi attached great importance to his monopoly power as Postmaster General. During his time in office, prosecutions by the authorities for illegal mail delivery were frequently heard. For example, two Indonesian Chinese arriving at Kai Tak Airport from Indonesia were found carrying letters that, by law, should have been sent through the postal authorities. One was subsequently fined HK$40, while the other was not prosecuted. Furthermore, in 1973, the postal authorities sued DHL, an American courier company introduced by Hong Kong businessman Po Chung, alleging that its delivery service infringed upon the Postmaster General's monopoly. However, the presiding magistrate held that the courier service provided was no different from a messenger employed by an employer to deliver mail, with the only difference being that the courier company operated as a limited liability corporate entity. It therefore fell under the explicit statutory exceptions and was not restricted by the monopoly. Consequently, the authorities lost the case. In the subsequent appeal hearing, the court held that there was no known offense in law to convict the courier company involved, and the appeal was dismissed. Addressing the case, Addi criticized the court's judgment as legalizing delivery by courier companies, remarking, "If anyone can act as a messenger, what happens to the Postmaster General's monopoly?" Nevertheless, considering that the authorities were reviewing the *Post Office Ordinance*, the postal authorities temporarily refrained from bringing further lawsuits regarding similar situations.

On 5 February 1975, the then Colonial Secretary Denys Roberts (later Sir Denys) submitted the *Post Office Bill 1975* to the Legislative Council for its first and second readings. The government's justification for submitting the bill was primarily that while the original *Post Office Ordinance* had been amended several times since 1926, many of its provisions had become obsolete and failed to meet modern needs. Therefore, the authorities drafted the bill with reference to the UK's *Post Office Act 1953* to replace and repeal the original ordinance. Among other things, the bill explicitly stated that it would be illegal for anyone to carry or transmit important commercial documents and letters via air freight forwarders, airlines, couriers, or any means other than the government postal service. Furthermore, the bill proposed that anyone infringing upon the Postmaster General's monopoly would, upon conviction, be liable to a maximum fine of HK$50,000 and six months' imprisonment, with an additional fine of HK$100 for each letter delivered in violation of the law. In contrast, the maximum penalty under the original ordinance was a fine of HK$500 and six months' imprisonment, with no per-item fine for illegal letters.

Following the submission of the bill, Addi repeatedly explained its provisions to the public in an effort to dispel concerns. He emphasized that under both the existing ordinance and the proposed bill, delivering commercial documents and letters through air freight forwarders or courier companies was illegal. The monopoly power enjoyed by the Postmaster General over mail transit was virtually identical to that in the UK and even more lenient than in the United States. Regarding allegations that more than 60 air freight forwarders and two courier companies in Hong Kong were engaged in illegal mail delivery businesses, Addi maintained that since the law had never permitted forwarders and couriers to deliver letters, the bill would not damage the legitimate commercial interests of the industry. Furthermore, he pointed out that unless other overseas countries established a licensing system, neither the Hong Kong Government nor the Postmaster General had the power to introduce a licensing system to allow private courier companies to legally deliver letters abroad. According to his understanding, no country in the world had such a licensing system, so any courier company delivering letters to overseas countries, including the UK and US, risked violating local laws. He also believed that apart from traditional postal methods, legal avenues for sending commercial documents and letters overseas included employers arranging for their own employees to act as private messengers to deliver mail abroad, shipping commercial documents and letters alongside parcels or cargo, or choosing the Speedpost service provided by the Post Office. Thus, there was no need for the business community to entrust courier companies with mail delivery.

However, the *Post Office Bill* faced widespread opposition from the business sector from the very beginning, with the backlash coming mainly from the American Chamber of Commerce in Hong Kong, the Hong Kong General Chamber of Commerce, air freight forwarders, courier companies, and many local businesses with overseas operations. On the eve of the bill's submission to the Legislative Council, the Hong Kong General Chamber of Commerce took the lead in January 1975 to organize an ad hoc committee, uniting the voices of different business stakeholders to express their desire to the Office of the Unofficial Members of the Executive and Legislative Councils (UMELCO) to continue delivering commercial documents and letters via courier companies. After the bill was introduced in February, the business community widely regarded its provisions as vague, unenforceable, and extremely draconian. They questioned whether the Postmaster General was attempting to use the bill to monopolize the commercial document express market, which would drive up business operating costs in the long run and force many overseas companies to relocate their regional offices away from Hong Kong, thereby jeopardizing its position as a regional business hub. Although Addi urged businesses to make good use of the Speedpost service provided by the Post Office, the business community countered that since its launch in 1973, Speedpost had only covered three countries—the UK, the US, and Brazil—failing to meet the need for sending commercial documents to other countries, particularly the Southeast Asia region. Moreover, compared to external courier services, Speedpost usually took longer to deliver and carried a higher risk of loss.

In addition, there were voices in the legal profession questioning Addi's interpretation of the existing legislation, pointing out that "basically every country in the world recognizes the legitimacy of services provided by air freight forwarders and courier companies," and "although postal monopolies exist in almost all Commonwealth countries, out of commercial interest, the handling of commercial documents and letters by air forwarders and couriers has always been recognized as an exception." The legal opinion further noted that elsewhere, postal authorities usually exempted commercial documents and letters when defining "letters" by limiting the postal monopoly based on the weight of the mail, exempting the transmission of documents and letters concerning the business of the sender or receiver, or exempting messengers employed for such transmissions. However, once the new bill was passed, all acts of sending, forwarding, and receiving commercial documents and letters by air freight forwarders and courier companies would be explicitly deemed illegal; and except under specified circumstances, no person other than the postal authorities would be allowed to transport documents into or out of Hong Kong.

In the face of criticism from the business and legal sectors, Addi revealed on 19 February that the third reading of the bill had been postponed from 26 February to 19 March to give import-export agents, air freight forwarders, and Urban Council members more time to submit views. However, due to strong opposition, the authorities did not submit the bill to the Legislative Council for its third reading on 19 March as scheduled. On 28 May, news emerged that the authorities would make substantial amendments to the bill, including concessions regarding the employment of private messengers by businesses, so that the amended bill could be submitted at the next Legislative Council meeting. A few days later, Legislative Council members and business representatives met at the UMELCO office on 6 June to discuss the bill, but the meeting ended without a conclusion. Thereafter, the Hong Kong Government suspended legislative work on the bill, and the social controversy surrounding it died down for a time.

More than a year later, the government suddenly submitted a newly revised bill to the business sector for review in September 1976, revealing that it would be submitted to the Legislative Council for a third reading on 27 October to be passed into law, provoking a business backlash. Under the call of the General Chamber of Commerce, fifteen industrial and commercial organizations formed the "Ad Hoc Committee against the Post Office Bill" in October of the same year and held a meeting on 14 October. The meeting approved a public seminar to be held on 20 October at the Furama Hotel to invite public views on the newly revised bill. The ad hoc committee also invited Addi to attend the public seminar, but he replied on 19 October stating that the Unofficial Members of the Legislative Council had formed a special committee to discuss the amendments with the committee formed by business representatives, and it was therefore inappropriate for the postal authorities to send personnel to the public seminar. Addi also noted in his reply that UMELCO had been listening to views from different sectors regarding the bill, with the most recent meeting held on 7 October, and that such meetings would continue.

On 20 October, more than 500 representatives, mostly from the business community, attended the ad hoc committee's public seminar at the Furama Hotel, including representatives from large enterprises such as Pan American World Airways, Gilman & Co., Hutchison International, and The Wharf. Their primary criticisms of the newly revised bill included that while it permitted the transmission of "regularly produced" data processing materials and certain "non-negotiable financial instruments" via commercial air transport, it neither defined "regularly produced" nor exempted other financial analyses and reports. Furthermore, all summary explanatory documents that should accompany financial documents, data processing materials, plans, and technical data could only be sent via the postal authorities. Regarding maritime freight, the bill prohibited the transmission of exporter documents via commercial air transport, but permitted other shipping documents to be sent via commercial air transport, provided that the distance between the cargo's destination and Hong Kong did not exceed 2,500 miles. This led some attendees to worry that after goods were shipped by cargo vessels to their destinations, the relevant exporter documents would still be in transit via post, causing delays.

The definition of "letter" in the newly revised bill was another focus of discussion at the public seminar. Given that the newly revised bill defined books, videotapes, and other items not normally considered letters as "letters", and only permitted books weighing more than 4 pounds to be transmitted via commercial air transport, attendees worried that such complex provisions could easily lead front-line corporate employees to break the law inadvertently. Overseas enterprises, organizations, and individuals entrusting air freight forwarders or courier companies to transmit commercial documents and letters from abroad to Hong Kong might also violate the law due to unfamiliarity with local legislation. In this regard, Queen's Counsel Henry Litton, who attended the public seminar, even criticized that under the Postmaster General's interpretation, the bill could define items ranging from menus to tombstones as "letters" at any time. The attendees finally reached a consensus at the public seminar that the provisions of the bill were unsatisfactory and agreed that the ad hoc committee should meet with the government to discuss the contents of the bill.

The day after the ad hoc committee held the public seminar, the Hong Kong Government suddenly announced on 21 October the postponement of the bill's second and third readings, emphasizing that it would study the attitude of the commercial and industrial sectors before making further modifications, but the authorities did not state whether it would postpone the bill indefinitely or withdraw it entirely. On 25 October, a government spokesman replied to sixteen questions raised by the public regarding the bill, stating that since the second and third readings had been postponed and the government was discussing the bill with UMELCO, the Postmaster General had no further comments. As the *Post Office Bill* was not submitted to the Legislative Council on 27 October as scheduled, the controversy gradually subsided, and the government ultimately never resubmitted the bill to the Legislative Council, meaning it was effectively dead.

=== Other postal innovations ===
Addi strove to bring innovations to Hong Kong's postal services during his tenure, leading an authoritative magazine to praise Hong Kong's postal service in early 1976 as the best and cheapest in Asia. Among the numerous innovations, a major one was the introduction of the Speedpost service in September 1973, making Hong Kong the first place outside the United States and the United Kingdom to launch Speedpost. The first parcel using Hong Kong's Speedpost service was sent on 10 September of that year and arrived in London at noon on 11 September, British time. To mark the occasion, Addi, who was on leave in the UK at the time, personally went to the British General Post Office to act as a postman and deliver the parcel to the first Speedpost customer, Peter Graham (later Sir Peter), General Manager of the Standard Chartered Bank Group. At its introduction in September 1973, Hong Kong's Speedpost service was limited to the UK, but it was soon extended to the US later that year, followed by Brazil and Japan in 1974 and 1975, and further extended to Belgium, France, Australia, and the Netherlands in 1976.

In addition, the Post Office introduced an "Express mail" service in 1974 connecting nearly a hundred countries, providing another faster option for sending overseas mail. In the same year, the Post Office also introduced a service known as Accelerated Surface Post (ASP), which utilized remaining space on aircraft after carrying airmail to transport surface mail together. Although the transit time was slower than airmail, the cost was cheaper, though the service was initially only applicable to printed matter sent to the UK via surface mail. On the other hand, the Post Office used to rely on Royal Mail tenders to regularly travel between Hong Kong Island and Kowloon to transport mail. However, with the opening of the Cross-Harbour Tunnel in 1972, this regular ferry service was finally discontinued in 1974. To improve postal service standards, Addi also invited retired senior officials from the British postal authorities to Hong Kong during his tenure to review staff training policies. In addition to the original basic training courses, new training courses were introduced for postal personnel at all levels to enhance their skills in areas such as customer service. Besides local training courses, he also arranged for local Chinese postal officials to go abroad for advanced studies to expand their postal knowledge, preparing for the promotion of more Chinese postal officials in the future.

Despite introducing continuous innovations in postal services, Addi strongly opposed the proposal to separate the Post Office from the government into an independent body during his tenure as Postmaster General. Regarding the recommendation in the *McKinsey Report* published by McKinsey & Company in 1973, which suggested that the Post Office should detach from the government and become self-financing, he revealed in an interview in May 1976 that the Hong Kong Government had rejected the proposal. The reason was that doing so would prevent the government from utilizing the annual surplus recorded by the Post Office for other public expenditures. Addi himself believed that if the Post Office operated independently from the government, it would increase the burden of postal fees on citizens, making the proposal completely impractical. Years later, in 1995, Hong Kong Post established a Trading Fund to implement self-financing, but structurally it remained a government department.

In terms of postage stamps, the Post Office released the third series of Queen Elizabeth II definitive stamps in June 1973 during Addi's tenure. Designed by Arthur Hacker, the then artistic director of the Information Services Department, the new series initially comprised 14 denominations ranging from HK$0.10 to HK$20, replacing the previous "Queen's Head" definitive series issued since 1962. Additionally, the Post Office issued a total of 20 commemorative stamp series during Addi's tenure (seven of which were designed by Hong Kong designer Kan Tai-keung), which included the annual Chinese Zodiac commemorative stamps issued for the Lunar New Year, as well as other themes such as two sets of Festival of Hong Kong commemorative stamps issued in 1971 and 1973 respectively, the Queen's Silver Wedding anniversary stamps in 1972, the wedding commemorative stamps for Princess Anne in 1973, the centenary of the Universal Postal Union in 1974, the Queen Elizabeth II's visit to Hong Kong in 1975, the new General Post Office commemorative stamps in 1976, and the Queen's Silver Jubilee commemorative stamps in early 1977. To further cultivate the atmosphere of philately in Hong Kong, Addi also presided over the establishment of the Hong Kong Philatelic Bureau on 16 January 1975. The bureau was initially located at the Central General Post Office before its reconstruction, and was jointly opened by C. D'Almada e Castro, President of the Hong Kong Philatelic Society, and Shiu Cheuk-pui, Chairman of the China Philatelic Association.

As the Cultural Revolution drew to a close, Addi also initiated exchanges with mainland China during his tenure. On 26 February 1976, Zhao Yongshou, deputy director of the Guangzhou Post Office, arrived in Hong Kong at Addi's invitation to lead a Guangzhou postal delegation for an inspection tour and an exchange of views with business departments. The delegation returned to Guangzhou on 3 March after a seven-day stay. From 28 February to 4 March of the following year, Addi reciprocated by leading a seven-member delegation to visit Guangzhou, where they met with the Guangdong provincial postal authorities to exchange views on matters such as the mechanization of postal services. Upon his return to Hong Kong, he described his trip to Guangzhou as "fruitful".

== Later life ==
Shortly after the government once again postponed the *Post Office Bill*, a government spokesman announced on 8 November 1976 that Addi would commence his pre-retirement leave in March 1977, and the position of Postmaster General would be taken over by Deputy Postmaster General D. J. K. Bamford. In fact, Addi reached the normal retirement age of 60 in March 1977. In recognition of his many years of service to the government, he was bid farewell by two senior postal officials from Canada who traveled to Hong Kong upon his retirement, and the British Crown further awarded him a Queen Elizabeth II Silver Jubilee Medal in June of the same year.

Following his retirement in March 1977, Addi emigrated with his family to the United States in the same year, settling in Newport Beach, a town in Orange County, California. He immediately opened the family-run Sunflower Travel agency in nearby Costa Mesa, serving as its chairman. The agency specialized in organizing tour groups to Hawaii and Mexico, as well as selling airline tickets and cruise tickets. On 29 March 1992, Addi passed away locally at the age of 75. After his death, the travel agency's business was inherited by one of his sons, Frederick. However, the travel agency faced operational difficulties following significant commission cuts by major airlines on domestic route ticket sales, and it ultimately closed around 2004.

== Personal life ==
Addi was a practising Christian. In 1944, he married Alice Tannourji, and the couple had three children: one daughter, Ariette, and two sons, Sargon and Frederick. During his lifetime, he was a life member of the Royal Commonwealth Society in London, the Hong Kong Club, and the Hong Kong Jockey Club, and was also a member of the Jonathan Club in Los Angeles.

== Honours ==
- Official Justice of the Peace (JP) (1969)
- Queen Elizabeth II Silver Jubilee Medal (June 1977)

== See also ==
- General Post Office, Hong Kong
- Hongkong Post
- Speedpost
- C. G. Folwell
- D. J. K. Bamford

=== Chinese-language sources ===
- "C. G. Folwell to retire next spring, Malki Addi to succeed as Postmaster General". Hong Kong Kung Sheung Daily News, p. 4, 30 December 1970.
- "New General Post Office Building construction to start in April". Wah Kiu Yat Po, Third Section, p. 1, 19 February 1973.
- "Hong Kong Postmaster General Malki Addi acts as a postman in UK". Wah Kiu Yat Po, Second Section, p. 2, 13 September 1973.
- "Opening of the Philatelic Bureau at General Post Office, Hong Kong". Wah Kiu Yat Po, Third Section, p. 1, 17 January 1975.
- "Postmaster General Malki Addi clarifies doubts over Post Office Bill". Wah Kiu Yat Po, Second Section, p. 1, 25 February 1975.
- "If new Post Office Bill is implemented, commercial activities will be hit". Ta Kung Pao, First Section, p. 3, 6 June 1975.
- "Chinese meteorological delegation invited to visit the Observatory". Ta Kung Pao, Second Section, p. 4, 4 March 1976.
- "Post Office separation from government independent is impractical and harmful". Wah Kiu Yat Po, Third Section, p. 2, 7 May 1976.
- "Business groups met yesterday to oppose the passage of the new Post Office Bill". Ta Kung Pao, Second Section, p. 5, 15 October 1976.
- "Due to fierce opposition from commercial and industrial sectors, the new Post Office Bill is postponed indefinitely". Hong Kong Kung Sheung Daily News, p. 8, 22 October 1976.
- "Editorial: The New Post Office Bill ties its own hands". Hong Kong Kung Sheung Daily News, p. 2, 23 October 1976.
- "D. J. K. Bamford promoted to Postmaster General". Hong Kong Kung Sheung Daily News, p. 7, 9 November 1976.
- "Canadian postal officials arrive in Hong Kong to bid farewell to retiring former Postmaster General Malki Addi". Hong Kong Kung Sheung Daily News, p. 5, 23 March 1977.
- "D. J. K. Bamford succeeded as Postmaster General". Hong Kong Kung Sheung Daily News, p. 5, 21 August 1979.
- Hong Kong Postage Stamp Catalogue Volume I (3rd ed.). Hong Kong: Postmaster General, 2004. ISBN 9789881212511.
- "Official commemorative cover and 3D card issued to mark the closure of the International Mail Centre on March 8 (with photos)". Hong Kong Government Press Releases, 21 February 2014.
- "Closure of International Mail Centre Post Office". Hong Kong Government Press Releases, 28 February 2014.
- "From DHL to Uber — Bureaucrats don't understand innovation". Stand News, 12 August 2015.
- "Relocation of General Post Office: HK$1.6 billion funding passed". Headline Daily, 20 October 2018.
- "About Us: The Old General Post Office Building". Hongkong Post. Retrieved 8 August 2019.
- Hong Kong Stamp Catalogue. Retrieved 8 August 2019.
