= Frederick Stewart (colonial administrator) =

British colonial administrator (1836-1889)

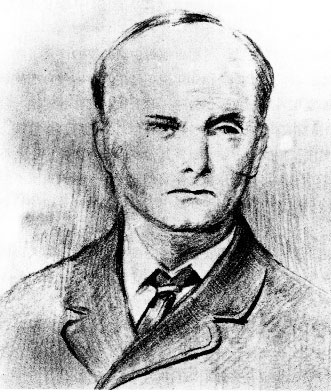
Frederick Stewart

Frederick Stewart (Chinese: 史釗域) (17 October 1836 – 29 September 1889) was an educationist and British colonial administrator, who served as the Colonial Secretary in Hong Kong from 1887 to 1889. He is considered "The Founder of Hong Kong Education" for integrating a modern western-style education model into the colonial Hong Kong school systems. Stewart could speak fluent Cantonese, which was vital to his work in the 19th century.

== Early life ==
The son of James Stewart and Jean Brown, Stewart was born in Rathen, Aberdeenshire in Scotland on 30 October 1836. He was educated in King's College at the University of Aberdeen.

== Career ==
He was teaching in a temporary position at Stubbington House School when a post was announced in the Aberdeen Journal on 7 August 1861 for the headmaster position of the newly established "Government Central School", known today as Queen's College. Five months later, Stewart would accept the position, reaching Hong Kong at the age of 25 on 15 February 1862. Ho Kai was one of his pupils. As part of a new British government initiative, he also became the inspector for all government schools in Hong Kong that same year.

On 30 June 1865 Stewart became the first head of the "Government Education Department" in Hong Kong. He resigned on 19 May 1881 at the age of 45. In 1879 his alma mater, the University of Aberdeen, awarded him the honorary degree of LL.D for furthering the interests of education in Hong Kong.

Stewart was appointed police magistrate in 1881 and Registrar-General in 1883. From 1887 to 1889 he would serve as the Colonial Secretary, second only to the Governor of Hong Kong. Informally, he would also act as the leading advisor on educational matters in Hong Kong. He was also the dean of the "Faculty of Medicine", the precursor of the University of Hong Kong until his death in 1889.

== Memory ==
Steward died in sudden illness while in the office of Colonial Secretary in 1889. A memorial stained glass window was erected in St. John's Cathedral. Stewart Terrace (十間) on the Peak was named after him.

== See also ==
- Grant School (Hong Kong)

Educational offices
New title	Headmaster of the Queen's College; 1862–1881	Succeeded by G. H. Bateson Wright
Government offices
New title	Inspector of Schools; 1862–1878	Succeeded by Ernest John Eitel
Preceded by James Russell	Registrar-General of Hong Kong; 1883–1887	Succeeded by James Stewart Lockhart
Preceded by William Henry Marsh	Auditor-General of Hong Kong; 1887–1889	Succeeded by Hilgrove Clement Nicolle as Auditor
Preceded by William Henry Marsh	Colonial Secretary of Hong Kong; 1887–1889	Succeeded by Francis Fleming
