= Arthur Winbolt Brewin =

Hong Kong government official (1867-1946)

Arthur Winbolt Brewin CMG JP (12 June 1867 – 12 August 1946) was a senior Hong Kong government official.

Brewin was born on 12 June 1867 in Yorkshire to Arthur Brewin. He was educated at Winchester and went to Hong Kong to join the cadet in 1888. He was made Justice of the Peace in 1894 and Inspector of Schools on 15 August 1897. In 1901, he was made Registrar-General on 15 March and member of the Legislative Council of Hong Kong. He was also acting Colonial Secretary of Hong Kong in 1911. He continued to serve on Registrar-General and Legislative Council until 1912. In 1911, he was invested as a Companion of the Order of St Michael and St George.

Brewin Path (Chinese: 蒲魯賢徑), at Mid-Levels, Hong Kong was named after him.

Government offices
Preceded by Ernest John Eitel	Inspector of Schools; 1897–1901	Succeeded by Edward Alexander Irving
Preceded by Stewart Lockhart	Registrar-General of Hong Kong; 1901–1912	Succeeded by Edwin Richard Hallifax
