= Ernst Johann Eitel =

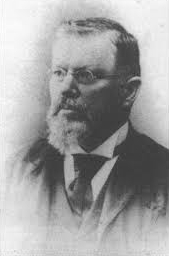
Ernst Johann Eitel

Ernst Johann Eitel or alternatively Ernest John Eitel MA (13 February 1838 – 10 November 1908) was a German-born Protestant who became a notable missionary in China and civil servant in British Hong Kong, where he served as Inspector of Schools from 1879 to 1896.

== Early life in Germany ==
Eitel was born in Württemberg, Germany. Eitel studied initially at the Pedagogium in Esslingen and the Theological Seminary, Schönthal. In 1860, he graduated from the University of Tübingen with Master of Arts (and Doctor of Philosophy in 1871). He was appointed vicar of the state Evangelical-Lutheran Church at Mossingen for the next 12 months.

== Canton and Hong Kong ==
Adopting the Chinese name 歐德理 (pinyin: Ōudélǐ), he came to Lilang, Xin'an district in Guangdong, China under the Basel Mission. Facing refusal of permission to marry an ex-Catholic, he transferred to the London Missionary Society at Canton in April 1865 and took charge of the Boluo Mission and the Hakka villages outside Canton. The next year, he married Mary Anne Winifred Eaton of the Female Education Society and Lady Superintendent of the Diocesan Native Female Training School.

In January 1870 he moved to Hong Kong while still having charge of the Boluo Mission. In 1875, he became Director of Chinese Studies. In 1878, he was appointed Supervisor of Interpreters and Translator to the Supreme Court though he resigned this post in 1882 after censure for accepting private payment for translation work he was required to do anyway. He resigned from the London Missionary Society in April 1879.

From March 1879 to 1896, Eitel served as Inspector of Schools of the Hong Kong Government. He was particularly vigorous in promoting education for girls and pursued a policy of private education over government-run schooling. He also served as Private Secretary to Governor Sir John Pope Hennessy for about two years from 1880 to 1881, again resigning under a cloud, the Governor accusing him of having exceeded his authority.

== Adelaide ==
Eitel left Hong Kong in 1896 to begin a new life as Pastor of St Stephen's Evangelical Lutheran Church (or St Stephani), Pirie Street, Adelaide, South Australia, in 1897. The next year, he was appointed part-time lecturer in German at the University of Adelaide, a post he held until he died. He was an effective preacher and soon the congregation had outgrown the old building, and a new building was commenced on Wakefield Street, opened in 1900. Five years later, Eitel was compelled by "stated reasons" to resign, and his replacement F. W. Basedow was inducted in 1906.

He died aged 70 at his home, "Schönthal", Dequetteville Terrace, Kent Town on 10 November 1908.

== A Cantonese Dictionary ==
Eitel published his Cantonese dictionary, Chinese Dictionary in the Cantonese Dialect in 1877. This expanded the work of James Legge on the Kangxi Dictionary.

Eitel used his own system of Cantonese Romanization which was a minor refinement of the work of Elijah Bridgman in his pioneering 'Chinese Chrestomathy in the Canton Dialect' of 1841 and Samuel Williams' glossary dictionary Tonic Dictionary of the Chinese Language in the Canton Dialect written in 1856. His publication was intended to standardize the pronunciation of Cantonese by students in Hong Kong.

His work was criticised by Wong Shik-ling in his book A Chinese Syllabary Pronounced according to the Dialect of Canton on the basis that it inherited inaccuracies from former works.

== Family ==
Eitel married Mary Anne Winifred Eaton (c. 1838 in Norton, Worcestershire – 26 February 1923); sometime around 1866. They had two sons and two daughters:

- Winifred Veronica Eitel, also referred to as Winifred Grace Eitel (c. 1868 – 16 November 1950) was born in Canton. She served as organist and choirmaster for St Stephen's Church, and became notable as a music and singing teacher in Adelaide. She married Francis "Frank" Bransby Milnes ( – ) in 1930. and moved to Victoria, died at Sorrento.
- Lionel Lambert Eitel (c. 1872 – 26 July 1947) married Florence Maud Tracey in 1913. Lionel was a printer, lived at Kingston Avenue, Richmond, South Australia. They had a daughter Winifred Maud (1917) and two sons, Stephen Ernest (1919) and Lambert Norton (1927) Eitel.
- Muriel Mabel Olivia Eitel ( – ), also a musician, taught in conjunction with her sister.
- Conrad Constantine Eitel (c. August 1880 – May 1947), newspaperman in South Australia and New South Wales. He represented Mawson during that geologist's first Antarctic expedition.

== Publications ==
- Eitel, Ernest John (1870). Hand-Book for the Student of Chinese Buddhism. Hong Kong: Lane, Crawford & Co.
- ——— (1873). Buddhism: Its historical, theoretical and popular aspects. London: Trübner & Co.
- ——— (1873). Feng-shui: or, The rudiments of natural science in China. Hong Kong: Lane, Crawford & Co.
- ——— (1877). A Chinese dictionary in the Cantonese dialect, Volume 1. London and Hong Kong: Trübner & Co.; Lane, Crawford & Co.
- ——— (1877). A Chinese dictionary in the Cantonese dialect, Volume 2. London and Hong Kong: Trübner & Co.; Lane, Crawford & Co.
- ——— (1893). Chinese School-Books. Hong Kong: China Mail.
- ——— (1895). Europe in China: The History of Hongkong from the Beginning to the Year 1882 . London and Hong Kong: Luzac & Co.; Kelly & Walsh – via Wikisource. [scan ]
- ——— (1900). China and the Far Eastern Question: A Study in Political Geography. Adelaide: Royal Geographical Society of Australasia.
- ——— (1904). Hand-Book for the Student of Chinese Buddhism (2nd ed.). Tokyo: Sanshusha.

Government offices
Preceded by Frederick Stewart	Inspector of Schools; 1879–1896	Succeeded by Arthur Winbolt Brewin
