= Geoffrey Robley Sayer =

British civil servant and historian (1887-1962)

Director of Education
- In office 1934–1938

Personal details
- Born: 11 February 1887 London, England
- Died: 27 January 1962 (aged 74)
- Education: The Queen's College, Oxford

Geoffrey Robley Sayer (11 February 1887 – 27 January 1962) was a British civil servant and historian. He was the head of the Sanitary Department and Director of Education in Hong Kong in the 1920s and 1930s.

== Education and career ==
He was born in London on 11 February 1887 to an affluent household. His father was a hydraulic and sanitary engineer. He was educated at Highgate School in London and Queen's College, Oxford, where he obtained an honours degree in Classics and Philosophy and played cricket. He also won a blue for football.

Sayer took the colonial service examinations after graduation and his good results allowed him to opt for the prime postings of India. However, he chose Hong Kong instead and arrived as a cadet on 1 January 1911. Sayer served on various positions and was an acting private secretary to Governor Francis Henry May in 1915.

He joined the World War I and was severely injured with the Rifle Brigade in France, where he attained the rank of Major. As he spoke Cantonese, Hakka and Mandarin, he was transferred to the Chinese Labour Corps until the end of the war. He returned to Hong Kong in 1920 as the head of the Sanitary Department. He gained reputation for his work with the vaccination campaign of 1923–24 and the cholera outbreak of 1932. However he was also criticised for his primitive and unhygienic methods used for refuse collection. He argued for continuing the practice of collecting by bullock cart and dumping at sea. Soon after he took a year's leave.

In 1934, he returned to Hong Kong to take up the position of Director of Education. During his service he was under the pressure of London for an overhaul of the education system and he was seen as incapable to bring the necessary experience. He was almost permanently on leave when he was pressured by the home government committee report of 1937. In 1938, he retired after the collision with the Teachers Training Committee report.

In 1937, Sayer published his first famous historical work, Hong Kong, 1841–1862: Birth, Adolescence and Coming of Age. He wrote the second history, Hong Kong, 1862 to 1919: Years of Discretion with the edition and additional notes by D. M. Emrys Evans, which was published posthumously in 1975. He also translated two books on Chinese pottery in 1951 and 1959.

== Personal life and family ==
Sayer played cricket throughout his time in Hong Kong in a private team, Sayer's XI for the Hong Kong Cricket Club and civil service teams. He was famous for his batting ability, scoring centuries against the Royal Navy in 1927 and 1931. He also captained the colony team against Shanghai and Malaya in the Interport Series.

Sayer married in 1919 and had three sons and two daughters. One of his sons, Guy Sayer, was the chief manager of the Hongkong and Shanghai Banking Corporation from 1972 to 1977.

Government offices
Preceded by Norman Lockhart Smith	Director of Education; 1934–1938	Succeeded by Clifford George Sollis
