= Eddie Ng =

Secretary for Education of Hong Kong

Eddie Ng Hak-kim GBS, JP
- 吳克儉
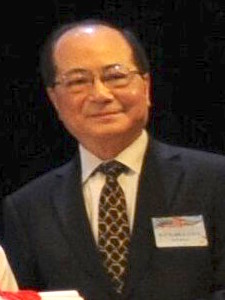

Secretary for Education
- In office 1 July 2012 – 30 June 2017
- Chief Executive: Leung Chun-ying
- Preceded by: Michael Suen
- Succeeded by: Kevin Yeung

Personal details
- Born: November 29, 1952 (age 73) Guangzhou, Guangdong, China
- Party: None

Eddie Ng
- Traditional Chinese: 吳克儉
Transcriptions
Yue: Cantonese
- Yale Romanization: Ǹgh Hāk gihm
- Jyutping: Ng^{4} Hak^{1} gim^{6}

Eddie Ng Hak-kim GBS, JP (Chinese: 吳克儉, born 29 November 1952) is a former Secretary for Education in the Hong Kong Government. From 2017, he is a temporary adjunct professor at the MBA Centre of Shanghai University.

== Background ==
In 1977, Ng began his career at the Hong Kong Council of Social Service co-ordinating non-governmental organisations. Since then, he has taken human resource management positions at multiple corporations including Motorola, Citibank, AT&T, Lucent, Jardine Fleming, JPMorgan Chase, and Macquarie Group.

In 2006, he began serving as member of the Hong Kong Examinations and Assessment Authority council and chairman of the human resources committee. By 2009, Ng became Chairman of the Hong Kong Examinations and Assessment Authority. He was later appointed as Secretary for Education of Hong Kong in July 2012.

== Controversy ==
In 2012, the government of Hong Kong attempted to introduce a new curriculum known as Moral and National Education. It was not well received by the residents of Hong Kong and was eventually shelved indefinitely. One of the reasons why it was turned down was because it was found that the "China Model National Conditions Teaching Manual", published by the National Education Services Centre under government fundings, was found to be biased towards the Chinese Communist Party (CCP) and the so-called "China model". The teaching manual called the CCP an "advanced, selfless and united ruling group" (進步、無私與團結的執政集團), while denouncing Democratic and Republican Parties of the United States as a "fierce interparty rivalry [that] makes the people suffer" (政黨惡鬥，人民當災). The minister for Education Eddie Ng defended that even though the teaching manual is biased, the subject should not be valued more broadly.

In December 2016, Ng attended a formal meeting with the newly appointed North Korean Consul-General, Jang Song Chol, discussing the current status of Hong Kong's education. Afterward, Ng posted on his Facebook page stating that he "anticipated exchanges in cultural and educational affairs will be strengthened in the future." Ng's statement was received negatively by the public, with netizens noting that North Korean style "brainwashing" should not be a shared common ground between Hong Kong and North Korea.

== Honours ==
In 2004, Ng was appointed Justice of the Peace (JP) for Hong Kong. Ng is also a fellow member of the Hong Kong Institute of Human Resource Management (HKIHRM), Hong Kong Institute of Directors (HKIoD) and Hong Kong Management Association. He is also adjunct professor at the Business School of the Hong Kong Baptist University, and Honourable Professor at the MBA School of the Shanghai University.

Political offices
Preceded by Michael Suen	Secretary for Education; 2012–2017	Succeeded by Kevin Yeung
