= Education Bureau =

Policy bureau of the Hong Kong Government

- 教育局
- Emblem of the Hong Kong SAR

- Logo of Education Department

Agency overview
- Formed: 1852 (174 years ago)
- Jurisdiction: Hong Kong
- Headquarters: 11/F, East Wing, Central Government Offices, 2 Tim Mei Avenue, Tamar, Hong Kong, China
- Employees: 5, 355
- Minister responsible: Christine Choi, Secretary for Education
- Deputy Minister responsible: Under Secretary for Education
- Agency executive: Michelle Li, Permanent Secretary for Education
- Child agencies: University Grants Committee Secretariat; Working Family and Student Financial Assistance Agency
- Website: edb.gov.hk

Education Bureau
- Chinese: 教育局
Transcriptions
Standard Mandarin
- Hanyu Pinyin: Jiàoyù Jú
Yue: Cantonese
- Yale Romanization: Gaau yuhk gúk
- Jyutping: Gaau3 juk6 guk6

Education and Manpower Bureau
- Traditional Chinese: 教育統籌局
- Simplified Chinese: 教育统筹局
Transcriptions
Standard Mandarin
- Hanyu Pinyin: Jiàoyù Tǒngchóu Jú
Yue: Cantonese
- Jyutping: Gaau3 juk6 tung2 cau4 guk6

Education Department
- Chinese: 教育署
Transcriptions
Standard Mandarin
- Hanyu Pinyin: Jiàoyù Shǔ
Yue: Cantonese
- Jyutping: Gaau3 juk6 cyu5

The Education Bureau (EDB) is a policy bureau responsible for formulating and implementing education policies in Hong Kong.

The bureau is headed by the Secretary for Education and oversees agencies including University Grants Committee and Student Finance Office.

== History ==
The Education Department (教育署 and 教育司署 before 1983) was responsible for education matters in the territory, with the exception of post-secondary and tertiary education. In 2003, the department was abolished and a new bureau, the Education and Manpower Bureau (教育統籌局 abbreviated EMB) was formed. In July 2007, under newly re-elected Chief Executive Donald Tsang, the manpower portfolio was split away to the new Labour and Welfare Bureau, leaving this body as the Education Bureau. The bureau was formerly housed at the Former French Mission Building.

In 2022, the Education Bureau introduced the Citizenship and Social Development subject, to replace Liberal Studies as one of the four core subjects in senior secondary education. As part of the subject, students will participate in fully subsidized field trips to mainland China. The trips range from two to five days in duration, with destinations such as Guangzhou, Shenzhen, and Hunan. The itinerary for the two-day trips includes visits to the Memorial Museum of Sun Yat-sen's mansion and the former site of the Whampoa Military Academy in Guangzhou. Another two-day trip involves exploring the Deqing Palace, a historical site in Zhaoqing city, where students learn about the ancient imperial examination system and Confucianism.

In August 2023, officials from Hong Kong and Guangdong signed a framework agreement to strengthen education exchanges and cooperation between schools in the two regions. The agreement aimed to promote collaboration and exchanges in education, nurture talent for the development of the Greater Bay Area, and contribute to the development of both regions. It encourages higher education institutions to collaborate on education services, talent cultivation, and technology exchanges.

The agreement also focuses on enhancing cooperation in vocational education, promoting the establishment of sister schools, facilitating exchange activities, and improving the quality of such exchanges. The Vocational Training Council signed a memorandum of understanding with Guangdong to initiate collaborative projects and establish the GBA Vocational Education Park. The agreement also involves Guangdong supporting the VTC's mainland operation center and providing guidance for the GBA Explorer Trip program, which aims to enhance students' understanding of GBA developments.

== Structure ==
The bureau consists of six branches, which are responsible for different policies. Each branch is led by a Deputy Secretary for Education.

- Further & Higher Education Branch
- Planning, Infrastructure and School Places Allocation Branch
- Professional Development & Special Education Branch
- School Development & Administration Branch
- Curriculum and Quality Assurance Branch
- Corporate Services Branch

The bureau also oversees two child agencies: the University Grants Committee Secretariat and the Working Family and Student Financial Assistance Agency.

== Education system ==
The Education System includes: Kindergarten Education, Primary and Secondary School Education, Special Education, Post-secondary Education, and other Education and Training.

== Controversies ==
=== Censorship of textbooks ===
In August 2020, the Education Bureau, with the aim to "help student develop positive values", made changes to the Liberal Studies textbooks of the six main publishers, who were invited to join the voluntary consultancy service introduced by the bureau in the previous year. The pro-democracy Professional Teachers' Union (PTU) said some teachers received messages from the publishers that the amendments relating to criticizing the mainland Chinese government and some political cartoons were replaced with emphasizing the possible criminal consequences for participants. The union accused that it is practising 'political censorship and "had severely damaged the goals" of setting up the project.

On 5 October 2020, the Education Bureau deregistered a primary school teacher, the teacher was accused of using pro-independence materials, which the Bureau claims is an act of "spreading Hong Kong Independence message". The Professional Teachers Union strongly condemned the teacher's disqualification. In a statement, the Hong Kong Professional Teachers' Union accused the education bureau of failing to conduct a fair investigation. It said the unilateral disqualification and issuing of warning letters to the school were "despicable acts of intimidation of the school management" and were unacceptable.

=== National Security Education ===
In February 2021, the Education Bureau, under Kevin Yeung, announced changes to the education system to incorporate the National Security Law. Notices to teachers explained that teachers should educate students as young as 6 years old about the national security law. In response, Ip Kin-yuen, the vice-president of the Professional Teachers' Union, said that he was astounded to see the "vast scope" of the new rules as well as the lack of consultation with teachers before the rules were published.

Later in February 2021, the Education Bureau released a 1,200-word guideline for implementation of the changes, claiming it was "obliged to clarify" so-called misunderstandings by the media when it had announced changes earlier in the month. Ip Kin-yuen responded and said that the guidelines would do little, and that the Education Bureau "should also hold proper consultation sessions among educators and members of the public to explain about the guidelines in detail, listen to their thoughts and opinions, as well as respond to questions and even defend it for themselves if they want".

In March 2021, the government announced that the Education Bureau would begin distributing books to all primary and secondary schools in Hong Kong, meant to cover topics such as national identity and the national security law.

In July 2022, Education Bureau chief Christine Choi Yuk-lin said that national education is not "brainwashing". Choi also said that Hong Kong students must learn about the history of China's socialist system, and must understand why it is suitable for China. Choi later said that students must learn from Xi Jinping's speech on Hong Kong, and that the Education Bureau would hold sessions with school principals and teachers on the speech. Choi also said that if students show that they want China to do well during flag-raising ceremonies or study tours, then it would meet the target of effective national education. In contrast, Priscilla Leung argued and said about the study tours that "In fact, many students have come back from these visits [saying] they don't believe in what they saw, [they claimed] everything was staged."

In September 2022, the Bureau released the updated Primary Education Curriculum Guide, which suggested between 19 and 25% of the student's lesson time should be devoted to national education and national security education.

In October 2022, the Education Bureau revealed the "Citizenship, Economics and Society" curriculum, designed for students to focus on national identity, the national constitution, and the Basic Law. Other countries' use of democracy and political systems were also removed from the curriculum.

On 24 October 2022, the Education Bureau confirmed that new teachers in public and direct subsidy scheme schools would be required to take a test on national security and the Basic Law, including kindergarten teachers.

In December 2022, the Education Bureau released an inspection report, saying that many schools had failed in teaching national security.

In November 2023, the Bureau released a draft for new science classes that would emphasize China's achievements and the importance to national security.

==== Universities ====
In July 2022, the University of Hong Kong began requiring students to take a course on the national security law in order to graduate. Students must watch 10 hours of videos and pass an online test in order to complete the mandatory security class.

Other universities, including Chinese University of Hong Kong, Hong Kong University of Science and Technology, and the Hong Kong Polytechnic University also began offering courses on national security. The course is listed as a graduation requirement.

Education Bureau chief Christine Choi also said that university student unions were "instigating the anti-China sentiment and hatred toward the Chinese people" during the 2019 Hong Kong protests.

In December 2022, the Education Bureau said that all universities must require students to take courses on national education, stating "Education on the [Chinese] constitution, the Basic Law and the national security law should also form an important part of the university curriculum, with a view to nurturing students into law-abiding and responsible citizens."

=== Study tour ===
In March 2021, the Education Bureau revealed that new teachers in Hong Kong would have to travel to mainland China to undergo mandatory training.

In July 2022, the Education Bureau asked secondary schools to create plans for taking students on mainland China study tours.

=== Liberal studies ===
In April 2021, a survey by PORI found that more than 60% of Hong Kongers opposed changes to the Liberal Studies course, changes implemented by the Education Bureau after the course came under attack from pro-Beijing figures who claimed the course was used to encourage students to take part in the 2019-20 Hong Kong protests.

In January 2023, trips to mainland China became mandatory for 50,000 Secondary Five students as part of the Liberal Studies course.

The course was renamed as "Citizenship and Social Development", and Hong Kong Free Press reported that teachers had become fearful of critical thinking and discussion.

=== National flag ceremonies ===
In October 2021, the Education Bureau revealed new guidelines for implementing national flag ceremonies in schools, stating that it would "promote national education and help students develop a sense of belonging to the country, an affection for the Chinese people and enhance their sense of national identity."

Under the ordinance, Hong Kong's universities, secondary schools and primary schools are required to hold weekly flag-hoisting ceremonies.

In October 2022, after St. Francis Xavier's School suspended 3 students, the Education Bureau was criticized for not providing guidelines on punishment if national flag ceremony rules were broken.

=== Putonghua ===
In July 2022, Education Bureau chief Christine Choi said that the city would soon push students to use Putonghua rather than the local language, Cantonese. Choi said that in the future, all classes should be delivered in Putonghua.

=== British Hong Kong ===
In August 2022, the Education Bureau claimed that Hong Kong was never a British colony, and that the British did not have sovereignty over Hong Kong.

=== Music video ===
In September 2022, the Education Bureau encouraged schools to broadcast a patriotic music video called "On the Young China" and urged teachers, students, and parents to "appreciate" it.

=== Teacher conduct ===
In December 2022, the Education Bureau released a set of guidelines on conduct for teachers, which listed protecting national security, social order, and public interest as a priority. In addition, the guidelines stipulated that teachers should promote national education with a correct understanding of the national security law.

=== English ===
In 1998, schools had to adapt to "biliteracy and trilingualism". Pre-1997, 90% of secondary schools taught most subjects in English, and by 2019, only 30% used English.

=== Principals ===
In March 2023, the Education Bureau said that principals must have a "sense of national identity".

=== Contracts ===
In June 2023, the Education Bureau revised its guidelines, to mandate that government-subsidized schools must include national security terms in their contracts.

=== Mainland China-based children ===
In September 2023, SCMP reported that government officials were trying to convince parents from mainland China to send their children to Hong Kong schools, to counter a drop in enrollment in Hong Kong.

=== National anthem ===
In June 2024, the Hong Kong Education Bureau warned two schools that their students were not singing the national anthem loudly enough.

== See also ==
- Education in Hong Kong
- Government of Hong Kong
- Hong Kong Examinations and Assessment Authority
- List of Hong Kong government agencies
- School-Based Management Policy
- Mother-Tongue teaching in Hong Kong
