= Director of Education (Hong Kong) =

- Traditional Chinese: 教育署署長
Transcriptions
Standard Mandarin
- Hanyu Pinyin: Jiàoyùshǔ Shǔzhǎng
Yue: Cantonese
- Yale Romanization: Gaau yuhk chyúh chyúh jéung
- Jyutping: Gaau3 juk6 cyu5 cyu5 zoeng2

The Director of Education was a position in the Hong Kong Government. The officeholder headed the former Education Department.

== History ==
As a result of restructuring in 1983, the old Education Department was reorganised into the Education and Manpower Branch and the Education Department. The old position of Director of Education (教育司) was, accordingly, split into the Secretary for Education and Manpower and Director of Education (教育署長), with the latter reporting to the former.

The position was abolished in 2003. The functions of the Director of Education were transferred to the Permanent Secretary for Education in 2003, following the passage of the Education Reorganization (Miscellaneous Amendments) Bill 2002 in the Legislative Council.

== List of office holders ==
- Colvyn Hugh Haye (1980 – 1984)
- Leung Man-kin (1984 – 1987)
- Li Yuet-ting (1987 – 1992)
- Dominic Wong (1992 – 1994)
- Lam Woon-kwong (1994 – 1996)
- Helen Yu (1996 – 1998)
- Fanny Law (November 1998 – June 2000)
- Matthew Cheung (2000 – July 2002)
- Lee Hing Fai (acting) 2002 – 1 January 2003
