= Crisis Negotiators =

2024 Hong Kong film by Herman Yau

- Theatrical poster
- Traditional Chinese: 談判專家
- Jyutping: Taam^{4} Pun^{3} Zyun^{1} Gaa^{1}
- Directed by: Herman Yau
- Screenplay by: Herman Yau
- Based on: The Negotiator by F. Gary Gray
- Produced by: Andy Lau
- Starring: Sean Lau; Francis Ng
- Cinematography: Joe Chan
- Edited by: Lam Wing-Lui
- Music by: Mak Chun Hung
- Production companies: Hengdian Entertainment; Guava Pictures; Lian Ray Pictures
- Distributed by: Edko Films
- Release dates: 24 May 2024 (China); 13 June 2024 (Hong Kong)
- Running time: 120 minutes
- Country: Hong Kong
- Language: Cantonese
- Box office: US$21.9 million

Crisis Negotiators (Chinese: 談判專家) is a 2024 Hong Kong crime action film directed by Herman Yau and produced by Andy Lau. It is a remake of the 1998 American film The Negotiator, with Sean Lau and Francis Ng leading as police negotiators based on Samuel L. Jackson's Danny Roman and Kevin Spacey's Chris Sabian, along with an ensemble cast including Michael Miu, Philip Keung, Kent Cheng, Michael Chow, Chu Pak-him, Cherry Ngan, Yeung Wai-lun, Kenneth Lo and Timmy Hung. The film centers around police negotiator Cheuk (Lau) who accidentally becomes a murder suspect and is forced to take over a police station to clear his name with the help of his former colleague Tse (Ng).

The film premiered in China on 24 May 2024, followed by a theatrical release on 13 June in Hong Kong.

== Plot ==
In 1993, Tse Ka-chun, a police negotiator, along with junior negotiator Cheuk Man-wai and crime unit inspector Bun, are tasked with handling a hostage situation. A mentally unstable couple has taken over the Social Welfare Department office, armed with a can of LPG, after their son was taken from them by the authorities. Although Tse manages to secure the release of the hostages, the couple is devastated upon realizing they will not be able to see their son again and detonate the LPG, committing suicide. Feeling guilty for not being able to save the couple, Tse resigns and becomes a social worker, hoping to help the needy before they reach dire situations.

Three years later, Cheuk becomes the chief police negotiator and resolves a bank robbery along with the Special Duties Unit. That night, they have a celebratory dinner, which is interrupted by Cheuk's friend and fellow inspector Ka. Ka informs Cheuk that his informant has revealed that some of their misconducted colleagues, including Inspector Li from Internal Investigations, have embezzled money from the reparational fund, which Cheuk sits on the committee for. Later, Cheuk goes to meet Ka for a detailed discussion, but finds him dead, with police immediately swarming the scene. Being caught with documents for opening offshore account which Li forged, Cheuk is soon arrested as the prime suspect. In prison, Cheuk's supervisor, Law, tries to persuade him to confess in exchange for a reduced sentence, but Cheuk is motivated to break out of prison to prove his innocence instead. After a car chase, Cheuk arrives at and takes over the internal investigations office, holding Law, Li, Li's assistant Maggie, and police informant Lo as hostages.

The headquarters is soon surrounded, and Cheuk's negotiator apprentice, Yeung, tries to bargain with Cheuk, but is outmaneuvered. Cheuk makes his demands, including investigating the identity of Ka's informant and only negotiating with Tse. Tse soon arrives at the scene, puzzled by Cheuk's request to speak with him, to which Cheuk explains that he finds Tse to have a good heart and that his departure from the police ensured he would not be a mole. During the negotiations, Bun orders a breach, which backfires, resulting in the capture of two SWAT members. Tse is furious with Bun's hasty actions and demands full privileges as the chief police negotiator. He then orders the office's electricity to be cut, in exchange for the release of Law.

Cheuk's actions convince Maggie and Lo of his innocence, and they help him hack into Li's computer. Tse brings in retired inspector Wan to pose as Ka's informant, but Cheuk soon realizes that the informant is actually Ka himself, as he finds a tape of Ka exposing Li's crimes days before he discussed the matter with Cheuk. Cheuk lies that Li has agreed to testify against all his confederates on the police radio. Hearing this, SWAT team leader Ko and his subordinates involved in the fraud sneak into the building and launch a surprise attack, with Ko killing Li in the process. However, Li manages to give Cheuk his gym locker key with his last breath.

Unsure of who fired first, Bun announces that the negotiations have gone sour and orders a full attack. Tse tries to intervene but is discharged from duty. While leaving the scene, Tse sneaks into the building and has a final talk with Cheuk, offering to help him. Cheuk then disguises himself as a SWAT member and flees the scene with Tse. However, the corrupted officers spot Cheuk and give chase. After another car chase, Cheuk and Tse arrive at the gym, where Cheuk finds Li's audio tape about the ringleader of the corruption, revealing it to be Law. Law soon arrives at the scene, shooting Ko dead and offering Cheuk to put the blame on the deceased Ko and keep everything secret, but Cheuk refuses. Law overpowers Tse and takes him hostage. However, Tse has secretly turned on his walkie-talkie, and everything Law said is overheard by all policemen. Exposed, Law commits suicide.

Six months later, Cheuk meets Tse again when Tse arrives at the police station to follow up on a case of illegal hawking. Cheuk promises Tse that as long as Tse ensures the needy are helped from the beginning, he will safeguard them at the end.

== Cast ==
- Sean Lau as Cheuk Man-wai: a seasoned hostage negotiator who is framed for murder and corruption. The character is based on Samuel L. Jackson's Danny Roman.
- Francis Ng as Tse Ka-chun: a police negotiator-turned-social worker whose Cheuk demands to speak to. The character is based on Kevin Spacey's Chris Sabian.
- Michael Miu as Law On-bong: a superintendent and Cheuk's friend and supervisor who is secretly the ringleader of the corrupted cops.
- Philip Keung as Lee Chi-bun: an inspector of the Crime Unit.
- Kent Cheng as Lam Ka-cheung: the Deputy Commissioner who oversees Cheuk's negotiations.
- Michael Chow as Li Chun-kit: an inspector of the Internal Investigations Department and the mole working for corrupted cops.
- Chu Pak-him as Yeung Chun-fat: a junior police negotiator and Cheuk's former subordinate.
- Cherry Ngan as Maggie: Li's assistant and one of Cheuk's hostages.
- Yeung Wai-lun as Lo Dik: a con man, police informant and one of Cheuk's hostages.
- Kenneth Lo as Ko Hak: the SDU team commander and a corrupted cop.
- Timmy Hung as Wai Lun: Ko's second-in-command and a corrupted cop.

Also appearing in the film are Rosa Maria Velasco as Hoi-lam, Cheuk's wife; Kenny Wong as Ka, an inspector and a friend of Cheuk who was murdered by the corrupted cops; Wong You-nam and Kevin Chu as Mark and For, two SDU team members taken hostage by Cheuk; Tony Ho and Adam Pak as Igor and Sai-mok, the police snipers and acquaintances of Cheuk; and Ben Yuen as Wan Chi-ming, an inspector pretending to be Ka's informant on Tse's request. The film's producer Andy Lau and Kearen Pang (both credited as special appearances) cameo as a mentally unstable couple who take over the Social Welfare Department office in the beginning of the film.

== Production ==
=== Development ===
Crisis Negotiators is a remake of the 1998 American action thriller film The Negotiator. Director Herman Yau had initially rejected the offer to helm the remake, before agreeing to direct the adaptation on his second invitation. The film rights were acquired for US$100,000. The film entered pre-production in April 2023, with Yau confirmed as the director (and later also taking on screenwriting duties), and Sean Lau, Francis Ng, and Michael Miu cast in the lead roles. Yau wrote the screenplay closely following the original film, and branded the project as a remake in the marketing, describing his motive as making good use of the licensing fee. However, he also made amendments to the setting to suit the real-life situation in Hong Kong. In the original film, Samuel L. Jackson's character demanded a negotiator from another state to handle the case, but Yau set Francis Ng's character as a retired police officer instead, since Hong Kong is too small and using mainland's Public security bureau would require extensive content censorship. Yau set the story prior to the 1997 Hong Kong handover, as the film's plot involved police scandals. He described this decision as a way to avoid political controversies and better accommodate Chinese censorship requirements. He also rewrote the opening scene with inspirations from the Kwok Ah-nui incident, in order to enhance the film's relevance to social issues in Hong Kong. An official trailer was released on 13 May 2023, with Andy Lau announced as the film's producer.

=== Filming ===
Principal photography began in May 2023. Filming took place mostly in different studios, with Sean Lau and Francis Ng being separated for much of the shoot. Location filming occurred in Ho Man Tin in June, during which Lau was infected with COVID-19, leading to a pause in production for several days. Filming wrapped in early July.

=== Music ===
No.	Title	Artist(s)	Length
1.	"Boundless Oceans, Vast Skies"	Beyond	5:24
2.	"Goodbye Kiss"	Jacky Cheung	5:06

== Release ==
The film had its premiere in China on 24 May 2024, with a limited release in selected cinemas, followed by a nationwide release on 8 June. It was theatrically released in Hong Kong on 13 June 2024.

== Reception ==
=== Box office ===
Crisis Negotiators grossed approximately HK$8.5 million by the first weekend, and reached HK$11 million in the second week.

=== Critical response ===
Edmund Lee of the South China Morning Post gave Crisis Negotiators 2.5/5 stars and wrote that "almost every aspect of this new film pales in comparison" with the original 1998 film, although it is a "perfectly serviceable crime thriller" on its own, "the remake features many of the same plot twists and dialogue, it still manages to feel unconvincing", with "Yau [making] only a few changes in his version" and "swiftly moves on to the kind of generic thrills that he can churn out in his sleep". Lee also ranked the film 24th out of the 36 Hong Kong films theatrically released in 2024. Siu Yu of am730 also noted that while the film features "strong theatrical performances" from Sean Lau and Francis Ng and an opening scene that "connects to social issues and localizes the film", "many plot points and dialogues are almost identical, including camera angles and staging, to the original film". Wong Man of Va Kio Daily offered a rather positive review, calling the film "a product that appropriately reflects its era", with "a highly dramatic" storyline and side characters like Lo Dik and Maggie "bring a slight sense of relaxation to the overall serious atmosphere".
