= 2014–2015 Hong Kong electoral reform =

Proposed electoral reform

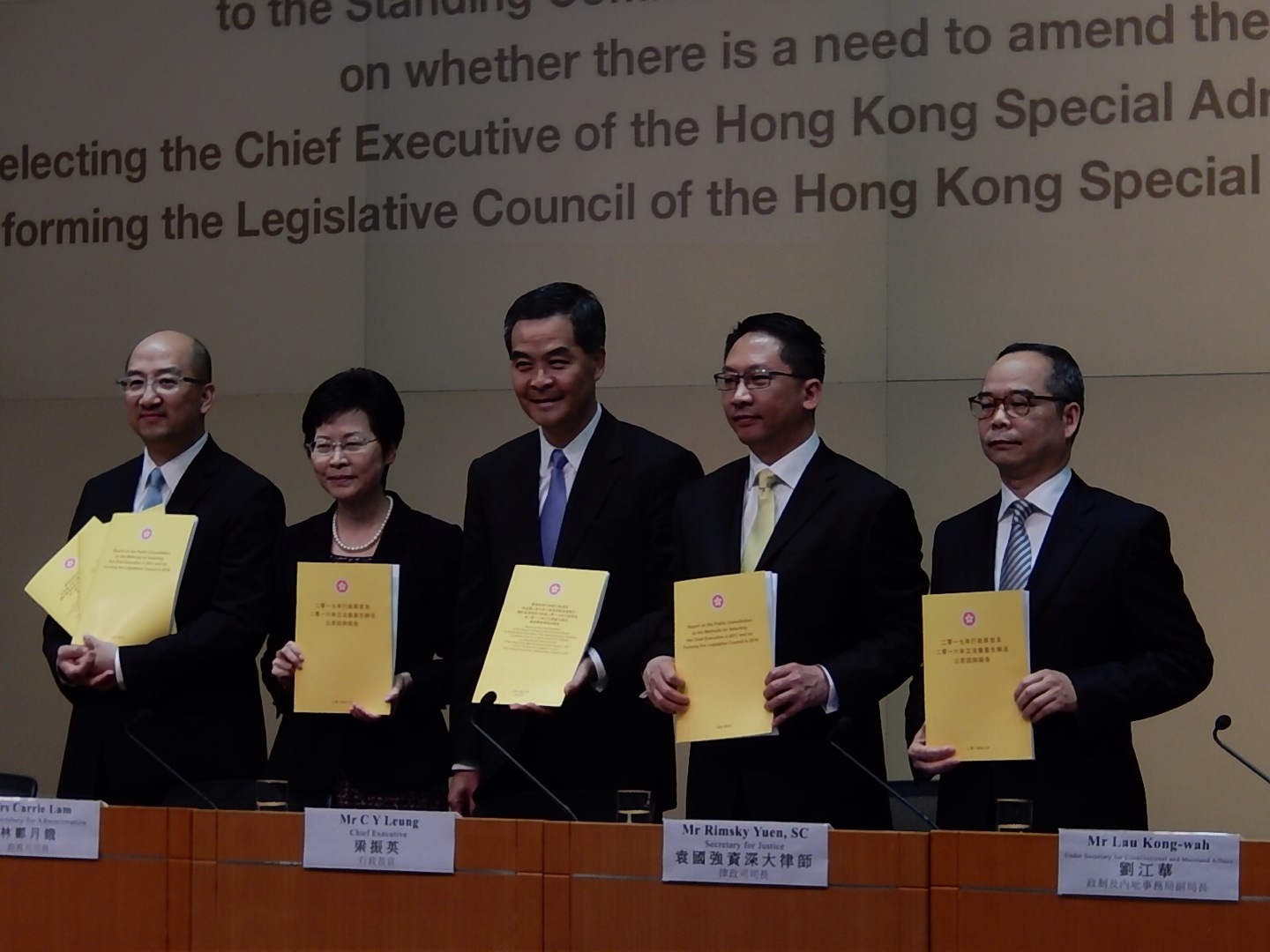
Chief Executive Leung Chun-ying published the Consultation Report on 15 July 2014.

The 2014–2015 Hong Kong electoral reform was a proposed reform for the 2017 Hong Kong Chief Executive election and 2016 Legislative Council election.

According to the decision made by the National People's Congress Standing Committee (NPCSC) of the People's Republic of China in 2007, the 2017 Chief Executive election may be implemented by universal suffrage. The issues on how to achieve universal suffrage in the 2017 Chief Executive election became the focal point of the public debates. Most of the major political factions campaigned for their ideas on universal suffrage, including Occupy Central with Love and Peace, an advocacy group for the occupation movement, to pressure the Beijing government to implement full universal suffrage initiated by the pan-democracy camp, as well as the Alliance for Peace and Democracy, an anti-occupy central alliance formed by the pro-Beijing camp.

After the first consultation period, lasting from December 2013 to May 2014, a consultation report was submitted to the National People's Congress in July 2014. On 31 August 2014, the NPCSC decided that a 1200-member Nominating Committee based on the present Election Committee should only select two or three candidates before presenting them for a territory-wide ballot by ordinary voters, and each candidate must have more than half of support members of the Election Committee. It also decided that the 2016 legislative election would undergo no further adaptations since those proposed by the 2010 electoral reform.

On 18 June 2015, the Legislative Council rejected the electoral reform proposal by 28 votes to 8, despite many pro-Beijing legislators having left the chamber in an attempt to forestall the vote.

== Background ==
=== Articles of the Basic Law ===
The electoral method of the Chief Executive of Hong Kong (CE) and Legislative Council (LegCo) has been a long debated issue in Hong Kong since the Sino-British Joint Declaration which decided the transfer of the Hong Kong sovereignty to the People's Republic of China (PRC) in 1997. In the Sino-British Joint Declaration, the Annex I states that the chief executive in the future Hong Kong Special Administrative Region (HKSAR) shall be selected by election or through consultations and the Legislature of the HKSAR shall be constituted by elections. The Joint Declaration stipulates that the government will be composed of local inhabitants and the elections or consultations will be held locally.

The controversy on how the electoral system of the chief executive and Legislative Council sparked during the drafting of the Hong Kong Basic Law in the Hong Kong Basic Law Drafting Committee (BLDC) during the late 1980s. In the Basic Law promulgated in 1990, it states the ultimate aim of selecting the chief executive and all members of the Legislative Council by way of universal suffrage is guaranteed respectively in Article 45 and Article 68.

After the transfer of sovereignty, the pan-democracy camp, the opposition camp in the SAR in which its ultimate goal was to fight for the universal suffrage constantly received about 60% of the popular votes in the LegCo geographical constituency (GC) elections. The annual July 1 marches launched by the pan-democracy camp which demanded genuine democracy as promised in the Basic Law also draw thousands of Hong Kong people each year.

=== 2007 NPCSC decision ===
Donald Tsang, the then chief executive, published the Green Paper on Constitutional Development to consult the public on the options, roadmap, and timetable for implementing universal suffrage in July 2007. A report was submitted to the National People's Congress Standing Committee (NPCSC) subsequently in December 2007. Following that, the NPCSC made the decision that provides:

The election of the fifth Chief Executive of the Hong Kong Special Administrative Region in the year 2017 may be implemented by the method of universal suffrage, that after the Chief Executive is selected by universal suffrage, the election of the Legislative Council of Hong Kong Special Administrative Region may be implemented by the method of electing all members by universal suffrage.

The NPCSC Decision rules out the universal suffrage in the 2012 CE Election and 2012 LegCo Election but on the other hand provides the possibility of universal suffrage for CE in 2017 and LegCo in 2020.

Although the pan-democracy camp protested against the decision of ruling out the 2007/2008 and 2012 universal suffrage, the Democratic Party, the flagship pro-democratic party in Hong Kong reached the agreement on the 2010 Hong Kong electoral reform which allowed minor changes to the 2012 CE election and 2012 LegCo Election.

== First consultation period ==
Chief Executive Leung Chun-ying announced on 17 October 2013 the immediate establishment of the Task Force on Constitutional Development headed by the Chief Secretary for Administration Carrie Lam, Secretary for Justice Rimsky Yuen, and Secretary for Constitutional and Mainland Affairs Raymond Tam as members to handle the public consultation. On 4 December 2013, the Consultation Document on the Methods for Selecting the Chief Executive in 2017 and for Forming the Legislative Council in 2016, entitled "Let's Talk and Achieve Universal Suffrage", was published which commenced a five-month public consultation period.

The Consultation Document set out the questions such as the size and composition of the Nominating Committee for the CE election and the size of Legislative Council, the electorate base of the functional constituencies and also number of geographical constituencies and number of seats in each geographical constituency.

The consultation period ended in May with increasingly heated debates and the Consultation Report was published in July 2014. Following that chief executive Leung Chun-ying submitted the Report by the Chief Executive of the Hong Kong Special Administrative Region to the Standing Committee of the National People's Congress. The public generally speculated that the NPCSC would set the framework of the electoral reform in the meeting that August.

=== Alternative proposals ===
During the consultation period, there were proposals suggested by various political groups and individuals which included:

==== Ronny Tong's proposal ====
Civic Party legislator Ronny Tong put forward an initial proposal for the chief executive universal suffrage in October 2013 and supported by Professional Commons legislators Dennis Kwok, Charles Mok and Kenneth Leung. The proposal suggests increasing the membership of nominating committee from the 1,200 member Election Committee to 1,514 and maintain the nomination threshold of 150 votes. Tong recommended the instant runoff voting system, which is used in Ireland, Australia, Sri Lanka, and mayoral elections in London, San Francisco, and some governors in the states of the United States, to have the elected CE who could accepted by all sectors. Tong also recommended cancelling existing law which disallows the chief executive belonging to a political party membership. Dennis Kwok suggests increasing the electorate base of the nominating committee to 1 million, which fulfils the "broadly representative" principle.

==== Hong Kong Democratic Foundation ====
The think tank Hong Kong Democratic Foundation (HKDF) also sets out proposals of 2016 Legislative Council elections and 2017 Chief Executive universal suffrage on 29 May 2013.

The HKDF suggests those functional constituencies (FC) in which voting includes corporate voters to be replaced by individual votes from staff and management members of companies, organisations or institutions that are the constituent members of each FC. For the 5 District Council FC seats requiring candidates to be District Councillors, that qualification would be removed and the 5 seats be reconstituted as a territory-wide geographical constituency (TWGC). The additional one-seat added to each geographical constituency (GC) for the 2012 LegCo election should be transferred to the TWGC, so that this constituency would comprise ten seats. A further ten new LegCo seats would be added to the TWGC. Candidates for the TWGC would be required to secure a minimum of 500 nominations, 100 nominations from registered voters in each of the five GCs. In conclusion, the 2016 Legislative Council would consist of total 80 seats: 30 seats from 5 geographical constituencies; 30 seats from functional constituencies and; 20 seats from the Territory-wide geographical constituency.

There are three alternatives for the formation of the nominating committee for electing the chief executive:

- By direct election of registered voters electing 3 members in each of the 400 District Council sub-constituencies by the single transferable voting system.
- Nomination committee based on 2012 CE election committee with all corporate votes replaced by individual votes from staff and management of companies in each sector and all elected district councillors to join the nominating committee.
- Nominating committee formed through random selection of a statistically representative sample from all registered voters.

HKDF suggested any Chinese national who is a registered GC voter can become a potential candidate with nominations from at least 1/8 of the members of the Nominating Committee (NC) or with at least 100,000 nominations from registered GC voters. All candidates once elected to be nominated by the NC have to affirm to abide by the Oath of the CE Office. After the closing date for submission of requests for nominations by candidates, the NC (e.g. jointly signed by 100 NC members) has right to evaluate the nominations for compliance with the rules after his or her declaration of candidacy and make complaint to the Electoral Affairs Commission to start a judicial process of removing the candidate. The final list of qualified nominated candidates will stand for election by universal suffrage, using the two-round system. A second round of CE elections will be held if no candidate received more than 50% of the votes and the two candidates with the highest vote count will proceed to the second round.

==== Scholarism ====
Student activist group Scholarism issued a statement on 23 June 2013 stressed the necessity of civil nomination for the 2017 Chief Executive election. For the 2016 Legislative Council elections, it called for the abolition of the split voting in the Legislative Council; increase of the geographical constituency seats to about 60%; and transfer of the District Council (Second) seats to the geographical constituency. For the 2017 Chief Executive universal suffrage, it suggests letting all 3.5 million registered voters to be the nominating committee, the nomination threshold to be 100 thousand voters and allowing the chief executive to have political party membership. For the 2020 Legislative Council universal suffrage, the Scholarism suggested the abolition of the functional constituencies and increase of the membership of the LegCo from 70 to 80 seats, half of them elected by constituency-wide proportional representation and the other half by territory-wide proportional representation.

==== Alliance for True Democracy ====
On 8 January 2014, the Alliance for True Democracy (ATD) released its "Chief Executive Election Plan" with the support of all 27 pro-democratic Legislative Council members. The election plan includes three channels for nomination: civil nomination, political party nomination, and nomination by the nominating committee. Civil nomination demands a candidate to secure the signed endorsement of 1% of the registered voters; political party nomination requires a political party receiving 5% or more of the total valid votes in the last Legislative Council direct election. The nominating committee shall not refuse to endorse any civil and political party nominees who meet the legal requirements, such as not less than 40 years old, has no right of abode in any foreign country; political conditions such as "love China, love Hong Kong" and "no confrontations with Beijing" are not acceptable. The Alliance also demands the abolition of the existing stipulation which disallows the chief executive belonging to a political party membership.

For the Legislative Council elections, the Scholars Group of the ATD put forward proposals for the transition toward the universal suffrage: For 2016 Legislative Council Election, the Scholars Group suggests:

Proposal A	Proposal B
Number of seats in Legislative Council increases to 80.; 60 seats elected by universal suffrage, including 35 seats by proportional representation with the current division of constituency.; 25 seats will be elected under proportional representation with the whole Hong Kong as a constituency. There is no election threshold, and the largest remainder method" and Hare quota are adopted. Each voter would then have two votes in two tiers of proportional representation.; Functional constituency is reduced to 20 seats. In the 30 current traditional FC seats, there are 9 seats for professional sectors; 15 seats for commercial and economic sectors; and 6 seats for social and political sectors. We suggest combining those seats into three large constituencies along the lines above, with each constituency returning two-thirds of its original number of seats. That is, the professional sectors will return 6 seats; 10 seats for commercial and economic sectors; 4 seats for social and political sectors. In each constituency, each elector can cast only one vote. The candidates that get the most votes win.; The District Council (II) FC seats will be cancelled.; Split Voting in the Legco will be abolished.	Number of seats in Legislative Council is 80.; 60 seats will be elected by universal suffrage, including 35 seats by proportional representation with current division of constituencies.; 25 seats will be elected by FPTP. Hong Kong is divided into 25 constituencies, with about 150,000 voters in each constituency.; Functional constituency is reduced to 20 seats. In the 30 current traditional FC seats, there are 9 seats for professional sectors; 15 seats for commercial and economic sectors; and 6 seats for social and political sectors. We suggest combining those seats into three large constituencies along the lines above, with each constituency returning two-thirds of its original number of seats. That is, the professional sectors will return 6 seats; 10 seats for commercial and economic sectors; 4 seats for social and political sectors. In each constituency, each elector can cast only one vote. The candidates that get the most votes win.; The District Council (II) FC seats will be cancelled.; Split voting in the Legco will be abolished.

For the universal suffrage of the Legislative Council, there are two proposals from the Scholar Group:

Proposal A	Proposal B
Total number of seats in Legislative Council is 90.; 40 seats will be elected under first-past-the-post (FPTP) system. With approximately 4 million registered voters, there would be about 100,000 voters in each constituency.; 50 seats will be elected by proportional representation, with the whole Hong Kong as one constituency with current largest remainder method and Hare quota. There is no election threshold in the proposal, any list that obtains more than 2% of votes (assuming voter turnout rate is about 50%, that is about 40,000 votes) can secure one seat.; Compare to proposal B, this proposal has fewer seats elected under FPTP, and has no election threshold, it would be relatively beneficial to small parties.	Number of seats in Legislative Council is 90.; 50 seats will be elected under FPTP. With about 4 million registered voters with estimated about 80,000 voters in each constituency.; 40 seats will be elected under "proportional representation". Hong Kong will be divided into 6 to 7 constituencies, each constituency will return 6 to 7 seats, and D'Hondt method will be adopted.; Compare to proposal A, this proposal has more seats elected under FPTP. The estimation is that parties with vote share lower than 5% may not get elected. The adoption of the D'Hondt method will reduce the fragmentation of the LegCo.

==== 18 Scholar Proposal ====
A group of 18 moderate academics, including Dr Brian Fong Chi-hang, vice-chairman of the thinktank SyngergyNet, former Legislative Council president Andrew Wong Wang-fat, Community Care Fund head Dr Law Chi-kwong and University of Hong Kong law lecturer Eric Cheung Tat-ming, put forward a mid-way proposal in April 2014 to give the public a strong role in selecting chief executive candidates without breaching the Basic Law. Under the plan, a candidate who received signatures of support from 2% of registered voters and become a possible candidate to the 1,200-strong nominating committee. Political parties and committee members would also be able to put forward candidates, who would need the support of one-eighth of the committee to enter in the election with universal suffrage.

==== DAB's proposal ====
The Beijing-loyalist Democratic Alliance for the Betterment and Progress of Hong Kong (DAB) on 22 April 2014 also put forward its own proposal, suggesting the formation of the nominating committee should be composed with reference to the composition of the current Election Committee, consisting of four sectors that have equal number of members while establishing subsectors for the counselling profession, women and youth, and SMEs respectively. The DAB's proposal opposes any nominating methods which are not stipulated in the Basic Law, including "public nomination" and "political party nomination".

An intended candidate should gain endorsements from not less than one-tenth and not more than one-eighth of members of the nominating committee to be recommended as an eligible prospective candidate. More than fifty percent of valid votes in the nominating committee a candidate should acquire for standing in the election for the collective will and the majority rule of the committee to be reflected.

== Key issues ==
=== "Love the Country and love Hong Kong" ===
On 24 March 2013, Qiao Xiaoyang, chairman of the Law Committee under the National People's Congress Standing Committee (NPCSC) stated that chief executive candidates must be persons who love the country and love Hong Kong, who do not insist on confronting the central government. Observers stated that Qiao comment was to screen out candidates from the opposition pro-democracy camp.

Li Fei, Qiao's successor as chairman of the NPCSC Law Committee stressed the similar statement on 22 November 2013, "the chief executive is accountable to the central government as well as Hong Kong. This means that the post must be taken up by a person who loves the country as well as Hong Kong – anyone opposed to the central government cannot [take it]."

=== Civil nomination ===
Some pan-democrats also demand the right of Hong Kong residents to nominate a CE candidate. Student-led group Scholarism in September 2013 called for parties to sign a charter which lists civil nomination as a priority. Under the civil nomination proposal, the nominating committee may put forward to run those candidates who receive a quota of nominations from ordinary voters. The Democratic Party, Labour Party and Association for Democracy and People's Livelihood refused to sign it as they disagree that civil nomination is the only way to put forward candidates. Secretary for Justice Rimsky Yuen raised legal arguments against civil nomination as he claimed it may bypass the nominating committee and "turn it into a plastic stamp" as Article 45 of the Basic Law states that "the selection of the Chief Executive by universal suffrage upon nomination by a broadly representative nominating committee in accordance with democratic procedures."

=== Organisation nomination ===
Qiao Xiaoyang also mentioned in his speech on 24 March 2013 that "the nominating committee is in fact an organisation. The nomination of CE candidates by the nominating committee is a form of organisational nomination. It is opposed by the pan-democracy camp as the method to screen out the opposition candidates as the pan-democrat candidates would not get a majority support from the nominating committee. The pan-democrat candidates were able to enter the last CE elections by getting just one-eighth of the nomination threshold from the Election Committee. There were also some interpretations that an organisational nomination would be a breach of the Basic Law.

== Pan-democrats' campaign ==
On 21 March 2013, twelve pan-democratic groups on the basis of the Alliance for Universal Suffrage for the 2010 electoral reform formed the Alliance for True Democracy. Chaired by Convenor Joseph Cheng Yu-shek, political scientist at the City University of Hong Kong, the alliance priority would be to strive for public support in the political reform debate, and to form a consensus proposal by the end of the year.

A group called Hong Kong 2020, launched by Convenor Anson Chan, the former Chief Secretary for Administration on 24 April 2013, with members such as Allen Lee, Johannes Chan, and Gladys Li, strives for the full implementation of the universal suffrage for 2017 CE election and 2020 LegCo election.

The New Year demonstration for genuine democracy on 1 January 2014 drew thousands of people. A "New Year Civil Referendum" was also conducted at the Victoria Park and over the Internet on the same day. More than 94 percent of over 62,000 voters thought that there should be an "element of civil nomination" in the CE election.

Scholarism also suggested a plan for five legislators from pan-democracy parties to quit as a means to trigger another de facto referendum on political reform, mirroring the similar move that five legislators resigned and launched the "five constituency referendum" for the 2010 reform package. However, major pro-democracy parties have expressed reservations, with some fearing that such action could divert public attention from the camp's Occupy Central strategy to fight for universal suffrage.

=== Occupy Central movement ===
In early 2013, Benny Tai, associate professor of law at the University of Hong Kong started the campaign called "Occupy Central with Love and Peace" that proposes a nonviolent occupation protest at Central, Hong Kong in mid 2014 if promises made by the Central People's Government for universal suffrage were not realised.

The Occupy Central movement commissioned HKPOP to run a poll on three proposals which involve allowing citizens to directly nominate candidates to present to the Beijing government from 20 to 29 June 2014. A total of 792,808 people, equivalent to a fifth of the registered electorate, took part in the poll by either voting online or going to designated polling stations. All three call for the public to be allowed to nominate candidates for the 2017 chief executive election, an idea repeatedly dismissed by Beijing as inconsistent with the Basic Law. However, the Alliance's "three track" proposal would allow the public, the nominating committee, as well as political parties, to put forward candidates. 691,972 voters (87.8 per cent) agreed that the Legislative Council should veto any reform proposal put forward by the government if it failed to meet international standards, compared with 7.5 per cent who disagreed.

A counter organisation, the Alliance for Peace and Democracy, orchestrated by Beijing, was established to counter the Occupy Central movement and it received widespread media attention when it launched a month-long signature campaign for people who oppose the Occupy Central Movement, which lasted from 19 July 2014 to 17 August 2014. The campaign claimed it had collected over a million signatures supporting the campaign, although questions are raised over credibility of the number of signatures collected.

=== August talks ===
In mid August, pan-democratic legislators met with Zhang Xiaoming, director of the Liaison Office of the Central People's Government in Hong Kong in groups to discuss political reform. Zhang stressed again that Hong Kong should consider political reform from a national security point of view and that Beijing and Hong Kong must be wary of a very small number of people trying to turn the territory into a base against the mainland. Following that, 49 of the 70 Legislative Councillors went to Shenzhen to discuss political reforms on 21 August. It was attended by director of the Hong Kong and Macao Affairs Office Wang Guangya and Basic Law Committee chairman Li Fei and also 15 pan-democrats. The Beijing officials and pan-democrats also met exclusively to further the discussion of the different stances between the two parties. Before the meeting, 26 pan-democrat legislators vowed to veto any reform proposal for the 2017 chief executive election that does not meet international standards for universal suffrage. Labour Party lawmaker Lee Cheuk-yan, said Hong Kong should not accept a proposal that only promises "one person, one vote," but screens out popular candidates.

== NPCSC's 31 August decision and the protests ==
On 31 August 2014, the Tenth Session of the Standing Committee of the Twelfth National People's Congress (NPCSC) set limits for the 2016 Legislative Council and 2017 Chief Executive elections. While calling for "universal suffrage," the Decision of the Standing Committee of the National People's Congress imposes the standard that "the Chief Executive shall be a person who loves the country and loves Hong Kong" and requires that "the method for selecting the Chief Executive by universal suffrage must provide corresponding institutional safeguards for this purpose."

The decision states that for the 2017 Chief Executive election, a nominating committee, similar to the present Election Committee system, be formed to nominate two to three candidates, each of whom must receive the support of more than half of the members of the nominating committee. After popular election of one of the nominated candidates, the new chief executive "will have to be appointed by the Central People's Government." The process of forming the 2016 Legislative Council would be unchanged, but following the new process for the election of the chief executive, a new system to elect the Legislative Council via universal suffrage would be developed with the approval of Beijing.

While Li Fei, a deputy secretary general of the committee, said that the procedure would "protect the broad stability of Hong Kong now and in the future," pro-democracy advocates viewed the decision as a betrayal of the principle of "one person, one vote," as they feared that candidates deemed unsuitable by the Beijing authorities would stand no chance of being nominated. The Standing Committee decision was set to be the basis for new electoral law crafted by the Legislative Council, where Hong Kong's Democratic Party had already promised to "veto this revolting proposal." As a result of the decision, Occupy Central said it was planning civil disobedience protests. Also in response to the CPC decision, Hong Kong Federation of Students and the student pressure group Scholarism staged a co-ordinated class boycott in Hong Kong and organised public events, including street assemblies, which escalated into the 79-day large-scale occupy movement.

== Second consultation ==
On 7 January 2015, the Hong Kong government published the Consultation Document on the Method for Selecting the Chief Executive by Universal Suffrage (Consultation Document) and launched a two-month public consultation on the method for selecting the chief executive (CE) by universal suffrage which ended on 7 March 2015. In the same month, the HKSAR government also released the Report on the Recent Community and Political Situation in Hong Kong, as its promise to the Hong Kong Federation of Students after the negiotation with the leaders in the course of the occupy movement. In protest to the NPCSC, the pan-democracy camp boycotted the consultation.

Albert Chen Hung-yee, a constitutional law expert and member of the National People's Congress Basic Law Committee, put forward a proposal suggesting a compromised proposal with "none of the above" option on the ballot paper. Under the plan, if "none of the above" accounts for 50 per cent of the vote or more, there has to be a revote. It is intended to put pressure on the candidates, handpicked by a 1,200-strong nominating body, to lobby for support of the public as well as that of the committee members. Pan-democrats call it a "passive" scheme and dislike the high threshold for a revote, while the pro-Beijing side does not want to give the public veto power. Chen dropped the proposal in March, citing "[a]t this stage I can't see any proposal will be accepted by both camps".

On 4 March 2015, Robert Chung, director of University of Hong Kong's Public Opinion Programme, suggested the government hold a vote to gauge public views after it releases its reform proposal in the next month. "If two-thirds of the voters say they want to pass the package, the pan-democrats should respect the results and not insist on a veto", Chung said, as the two-thirds majority is the requirement laid down in the Basic Law for the legislature to pass any political reform. Secretary for Justice Rimsky Yuen dismissed the idea as "[u]nder the Basic Law, there is no provision for a referendum. And Hong Kong is a special administrative region, therefore, there is no legal basis for us to have a referendum."

== Formal proposals by the SAR government ==
On 22 April 2015, the Hong Kong government unveiled its proposal for the electoral reform in the Report on the Public Consultation on the Methods for Selecting the Chief Executive in 2017 and for Forming the Legislative Council in 2016. Legislative Council convened to discuss the election overhaul plan. The new plan retained the composition of the Election Committee, forming a Nominating Committee at 1200 consisting of four sectors. No changes are proposed to the 38 sub-sectors of the Election Committee.

Proposed Composition of the Nominating Committee
First Sector	Industrial, commercial and financial sectors	300
Second Sector	The Professions	300
Third Sector	Labour, social services, religious and other sectors	300
Fourth Sector	LegCo and District Councils, Heung Yee Kuk, NPC, and NCCPPCC	300

Existing requirements that the chief executive must not have any political affiliation were maintained.

=== Nomination by the Nominating Committee ===
The Proposal outlined a two-step nomination:

- Recommendation by 120 to 240 Members of the Nominating Committee to qualify as Recommended Persons to the election; and
- Voting for nominating 2 to 3 Candidates by an absolute majority of the Nominating Committee.

=== Universal Suffrage ===
The 2 to 3 nominated candidates enter the chief executive election by universal suffrage. Chief Executive-elects are elected with simple majority in a single round of voting.

=== Stakeholders' Response ===
Chief secretary of Hong Kong, Carrie Lam, stated: "We should weigh very carefully whether the passage of these proposals or a standstill in constitutional development will be a more favourable outcome for the overall and long-term interests of Hong Kong."

Dissenting pro-democracy legislators had already stated they would veto the proposals. In response to the proposals, pro-democracy legislators marched, wearing black, from the chamber of the legislature as soon as Lam's speech ended. Some raised yellow umbrellas, a symbol of the Occupy movement.

Members of the Task Force on Constitutional Development – Chief Secretary for Administration Carrie Lam, Secretary for Justice Rimsky Yuen, and Secretary for Constitutional and Mainland Affairs Raymond Tam – together with politically appointed officials took part on 25 April in a territory-wide bus parade to appeal for public support for the city's constitutional reform package on an open-top double-decker bus on which slogans of "2017 Make it happen!".

A pro-Beijing group, Alliance for Peace and Democracy on 9 May launched a nine-day campaign, with hundreds of booths set up to collect signatures from Hong Kongers aged 18 and above, in support of the government's proposed electoral reforms. It claimed around 360,000 people added their names over the weekend. Meanwhile, the pan-democracy camp launched a citywide campaign to rally public opinion against the proposal.

=== 31 May meeting ===
On 31 May 2015, three top Beijing officials, Basic Law Committee chairman Li Fei, Hong Kong and Macau Affairs Office director Wang Guangya and Liaison Office of the Central People's Government in Hong Kong director Zhang Xiaoming met with members of the Legislative Council in Shenzhen, which included pan-democratic legislators. The Beijing officials dashed any hope of last-minute concessions from Beijing with tough stances during the four-hour talk and the post-meeting press conference. Li also stressed that the framework set down on 31 August would govern the election of Hong Kong's leader by universal suffrage in 2017 and onwards. The pan-democrats said they would definitely veto the political reform package as the meeting with mainland officials left them with no choice.

== LegCo voting ==
Secretary for Constitutional and Mainland Affairs Raymond Tam confirmed on 2 June 2015 that reform proposals would be tabled to the Legislative Council on 17 June with no modifications.

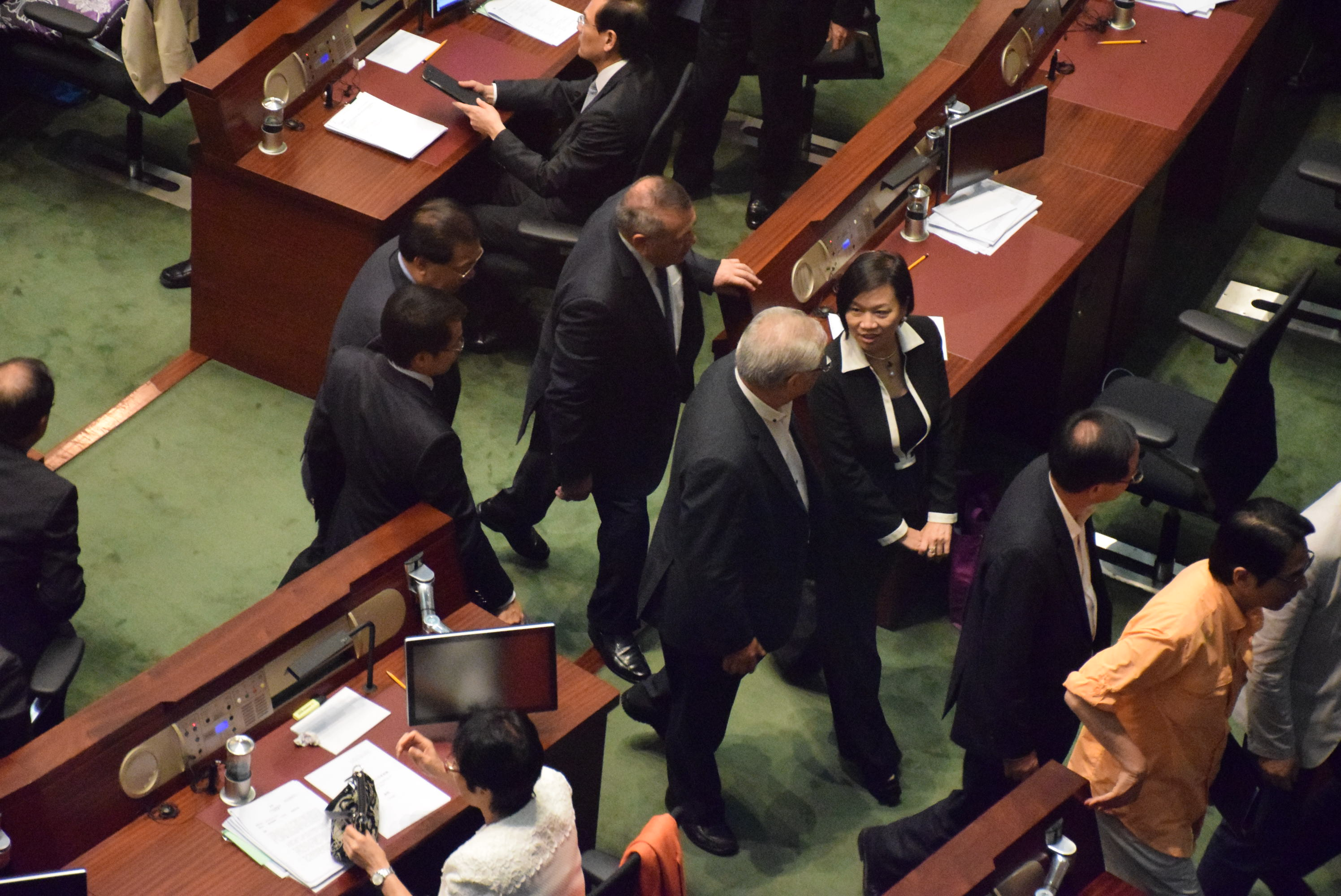
Pro-Beijing legislators walked out right before the historic vote.

During the second day of the debate on 18 June 2015, right before the vote, pro-Beijing legislators Ip Kwok-him (DAB) and Jeffrey Lam Kin-fung (BPA) led a walk-out of members of the DAB, the BPA, most members of the FTU and other pro-Beijing legislators, totalling 31, after Jasper Tsang denied Lam's request for a 15-minute recess. Lam later explained that the walk-out was an impromptu attempt to delay the division so that his party member Lau Wong-fat, who was delayed, could cast his vote in favour of the Beijing-backed reforms. Unbeknownst to the lawmakers outside the chamber, however, five Liberal Party legislators, Chan Yuen-han of the FTU and two other pro-Beijing independents remained in the chamber and voted in favour of the proposal. On the other hand, all 27 pan-democrats who had vowed to vote down the reform did so, as did one pro-Beijing legislator Leung Ka-lau representing the Medical constituency. The government's reform proposal failed as eight legislators voted in favour and 28 voted against, barely meeting the quorum of 35. Since it had been expected the reform would be voted down by 41–28, with Tsang as the president not voting to maintain neutrality (which would fall only six votes short of the two-thirds absolute majority stipulated by the Basic Law for an amendment), the failure in pro-Beijing camp's sudden tactics resulted in a surprising landslide defeat that would suggest to outsiders that there was little support for the plan.

The fiasco was described by analysts as an "embarrassment" for Beijing, and the Central Government's Liaison Office met or phoned pro-Beijing legislators about it after the voting. Much blame was placed on Jeffrey Lam Kin-fung who was seen as a key instigator of the walkout. Ip Kwok-him, caucus convenor of the DAB who stood up and ushered everyone to the exit apologised for his part. New People's Party chairwoman Regina Ip Lau Suk-yee lost her tough composure during a radio show on the next day, openly sobbing as she lamented her failure to cast her ballot. Liberal Party chairman Felix Chung Kwok-pan was offended by those who said it was "unfortunate" the Liberals had stayed behind to vote instead of joining the majority in their walkout. An advert signed by 33 pro-Beijing legislators was published in seven Chinese-language newspapers and in an English version published in South China Morning Post on the next days, saying their plan "was foiled by gaps in communication".

On 25 June, the Oriental Daily News published a section of leaked WhatsApp group conversation among pro-Beijing legislators before the voting. President of LegCo, Jasper Tsang Yok-sing of the DAB, was revealed to have joined the pro-Beijing legislators' discussion about their timing-control strategy. The pan-democrats criticised him for failing to uphold the impartiality as president and for exposing their plan to the rival camp. Tsang refused to resign, denying having done anything inconsistent with the rules of procedure or violated the neutrality of LegCo president. Media also noted that there was no mention of Lau Wong-fat at all even though his late arrival would trigger the walk-out.

GC/FC	Constituency	Member	Party	Vote
GC	Hong Kong Island	Tsang Yok-sing	DAB	Present ^{[a]}
FC	District Council (Second)	Albert Ho	Democratic	✗ No
GC	New Territories West	Lee Cheuk-yan	Labour/CTU	✗ No
FC	District Council (Second)	James To	Democratic	✗ No
GC	Kowloon East	Chan Kam-lam	DAB	Absent
GC	New Territories West	Leung Yiu-chung	NWSC	✗ No
FC	Heung Yee Kuk	Lau Wong-fat	BPA/ES	Absent
GC	New Territories East	Emily Lau	Democratic	✗ No
GC	New Territories West	Tam Yiu-chung	DAB	Absent
FC	Real Estate and Construction	Abraham Shek	BPA	Absent
FC	Catering	Tommy Cheung	Liberal	✓ Yes
FC	District Council (Second)	Frederick Fung	ADPL	✗ No
FC	Wholesale and Retail	Vincent Fang	Liberal	✓ Yes
GC	New Territories West	Wong Kwok-hing	FTU	Absent
FC	Health Services	Joseph Lee	Independent	✗ No
FC	Commercial (First)	Jeffrey Lam	BPA/ES	Absent
FC	Industrial (First)	Andrew Leung	BPA/ES	Absent
FC	Import and Export	Wong Ting-kwong	DAB	Absent
GC	New Territories East	Ronny Tong	Civic	✗ No
GC	Hong Kong Island	Cyd Ho	Labour/Civic Act-up	✗ No
FC	District Council (Second)	Starry Lee	DAB	Absent
FC	Industrial (Second)	Lam Tai-fai	Independent	✓ Yes
GC	New Territories East	Chan Hak-kan	DAB	Absent
FC	Insurance	Chan Kin-por	Independent	✓ Yes
GC	Kowloon West	Priscilla Leung	BPA/KWND	Absent
FC	Medical	Leung Ka-lau	Independent	✗ No
FC	Social Welfare	Cheung Kwok-che	Labour/SWGU	✗ No
GC	Kowloon East	Wong Kwok-kin	FTU	Absent
FC	District Council (First)	Ip Kwok-him	DAB	Absent
GC	Hong Kong Island	Regina Ip	NPP	Absent
GC	Kowloon East	Paul Tse	Independent	Absent
GC	Kowloon East	Alan Leong	Civic	✗ No
GC	New Territories East	Leung Kwok-hung	LSD	✗ No
GC	New Territories West	Albert Chan	People Power	✗ No
GC	Kowloon West	Wong Yuk-man	Independent	✗ No
GC	Kowloon West	Claudia Mo	Civic	✗ No
GC	New Territories West	Michael Tien	NPP	Absent
GC	New Territories East	James Tien	Liberal	✓ Yes
FC	Finance	Ng Leung-sing	Independent	Absent
FC	Agriculture and Fisheries	Steven Ho	DAB	Absent
FC	Transport	Frankie Yick	Liberal	✓ Yes
GC	Kowloon East	Wu Chi-wai	Democratic	✗ No
FC	Tourism	Yiu Si-wing	Independent	Absent
GC	New Territories East	Gary Fan	Neo Democrats	✗ No
FC	Sports, Performing Arts, Culture and Publication	Ma Fung-kwok	New Forum	Absent
FC	Information Technology	Charles Peter Mok	Prof Commons	✗ No
GC	New Territories East	Chan Chi-chuen	People Power/Frontier	✗ No
GC	New Territories West	Chan Han-pan	DAB/NTAS	Absent
GC	Hong Kong Island	Kenneth Chan	Civic	✗ No
FC	District Council (Second)	Chan Yuen-han	FTU	✓ Yes
GC	New Territories West	Leung Che-cheung	DAB	Absent
FC	Accountancy	Kenneth Leung	Prof Commons	✗ No
GC	New Territories West	Alice Mak	FTU	Absent
GC	New Territories West	Kwok Ka-ki	Civic	✗ No
FC	Labour	Kwok Wai-keung	FTU	Absent
FC	Legal	Dennis Kwok	Civic	✗ No
FC	Financial Services	Christopher Cheung	BPA	Absent
GC	New Territories East	Fernando Cheung	Labour	✗ No
GC	Hong Kong Island	Sin Chung-kai	Democratic	✗ No
GC	Kowloon West	Helena Wong	Democratic	✗ No
FC	Education	Ip Kin-yuen	Independent	✗ No
GC	New Territories East	Elizabeth Quat	DAB	Absent
FC	Commercial (Second)	Martin Liao	Independent	Absent
FC	Labour	Poon Siu-ping	FLU	Absent ^{[b]}
FC	Labour	Tang Ka-piu	FTU	Absent
GC	Kowloon West	Chiang Lai-wan	DAB	Absent
FC	Engineering	Lo Wai-kwok	BPA	Absent
FC	Textiles and Garment	Chung Kwok-pan	Liberal	✓ Yes
GC	Hong Kong Island	Christopher Chung	DAB	Absent
FC	Architectural, Surveying and Planning	Tony Tse	Independent	Absent
Source: a As President of the Legislative Council, Tsang did not vote per custom. b Poon was physically inside the chamber but did not indicate his presence and thus did not register his presence in records.

== International responses ==
=== United States ===
In April 2014, Anson Chan, former Chief Secretary of Hong Kong and founder of pro-democracy group Hong Kong 2020, and Martin Lee, founder of Hong Kong's opposition Democratic Party, went to the United States and met Joe Biden, US vice-president at the White House. The activists spoke out against Beijing increasing control over Hong Kong, and of their fear that only candidates picked by Beijing would be allowed to take part in the 2017 Chief Executive election. Lee and Chan also voiced concerns over press freedom in Hong Kong, referring to violent assaults on journalists and alleging that Beijing is pressuring advertisers to shun critical media. Biden underscored Washington's "long-standing support for democracy in Hong Kong and for the city's high degree of autonomy under the 'one country, two systems' framework," the White House said. China warned the United States against meddling in Hong Kong's internal affairs after Biden met with Chan and Lee. In response, Chinese Ministry of Foreign Affairs said that it "firmly opposes any countries meddling in the city's internal affairs in any way," South China Morning Post quoted.

During their trip to America, Lee and Chan also met with Nancy Pelosi, minority leader of the House of Representatives, and members of the Congressional-Executive Commission on China. "The future of freedom and democracy in Hong Kong is under serious threat," Senator Sherrod Brown, head of the commission, said in a prepared statement, as quoted by Reuters. "China is already placing 'pre-conditions' on who can run, raising serious doubts about whether the elections will be free and fair," he added.

In early May 2015, a US bipartisan delegation led by Matt Salmon, a Republican who chairs the Subcommittee on East Asian and Pacific Affairs with Republican Tom Emmer and Democrat Alan Lowenthal on a fact-finding mission visited Hong Kong to learn about developments in Hong Kong. They held meetings with chief executive Leung Chun-ying and also legislators across the spectrum on the government's reform package, which pan-democrats have pledged to reject. Matt Salmon told leaders of the four pan-democratic parties, Democratic Party chairwoman Emily Lau Wai-hing, Civic Party leader Alan Leong Kah-kit, Labour Party chairman Lee Cheuk-yan and Association for Democracy and People's Livelihood lawmaker Frederick Fung Kin-kee, that a system where "people are elected by the people" was better than one in which leaders were chosen via a narrow constituency, saying that 'sometimes half a loaf is better than no loaf'. Lee said the congressmen had described the proposed chief executive election plan as "definitely not equal suffrage" and said they were not trying to convince the pan-democrats but to learn more about the reform debate. Fung said the congressmen had described the reform plan as not fully democratic but had stressed it was a decision for Hongkongers to make. Tam Yiu-chung, ex-chairman of the Democratic Alliance for the Betterment and Progress of Hong Kong who also met the trio, read the congressmen's interest in compromise as a signal that they wanted to see the reform package passed.

=== United Kingdom ===
In July 2014, Anson Chan and Martin Lee visited the United Kingdom and met with Deputy Prime Minister and the leader of the coalition's junior partner the Liberal Democrats Nick Clegg and raised concerns over China's jurisdiction of the region, and questioning Britain's commitment to Hong Kong's democratic development. Clegg affirmed Britain's commitment to honour the pledge that if China breached the Sino-British Joint Declaration, Britain would "mobilize the international community and pursue every legal and other avenue available". Clegg also criticised British Prime Minister David Cameron for prioritising trade with the world's second largest economy over democracy in Hong Kong. A source close to Clegg said Cameron's Conservative Party had become "so deferential in their attitude to China" they would not stand up for democracy in Hong Kong. China issued a formal complaint to Britain after the meeting. Chinese Foreign Ministry spokesman Hong Lei said China was firmly opposed to any foreign interference in its internal affairs on any pretext.

Anson Chan and Martin Lee also attended a Foreign Affairs Select Committee hearing, speaking out that they were "concerned that neither of the two signatories to the Joint Declaration – that is, China and Britain – is adequately fulfilling their respective responsibilities on the terms of this internationally binding treaty." Richard Ottaway, a member of Parliament and chairman of the Foreign Affairs Committee, said that the committee would announce a report as early as next week on the British government's policy toward Hong Kong, but "it's not a report into the internal operations of Hong Kong." Within two months of its publication, the British government will have to respond to the conclusions and recommendations set out in the report.

Liu Xiaoming, PRC's ambassador to Britain, described Martin Lee and Anson Chan as "bent on undermining the stability of Hong Kong". He sent a letter to the members of parliament on 14 July, warned members against visiting Hong Kong. "I do not think your planned visit to Hong Kong is helpful and strongly advise you not make it," Liu wrote. A second letter, from the National People's Congress Foreign Affairs Committee, sent to the British committee in July, saying that the inquiry into post-handover Hong Kong by the committee would be seen as interference in China's internal affairs and called for it to be cancelled. Undeterred by warnings from Beijing, Richard Ottaway told the Sunday Morning Post: "We are planning to come in December and I have no reason to think that we won't be there." "The Hong Kong government, the Chinese government and the National People's Congress shouldn't necessarily think that we are automatically hostile," Ottaway said.

Chris Patten, the last Governor of Hong Kong under the British rule, wrote in the Financial Times in September, questioning Britain's "sense of honour" in failing to condemn China's planned reforms in Hong Kong, which he said would introduce the kind of stage-managed democracy seen in Iran. He said that the UK had a “moral and political obligation” to defend full democracy in the city. In response to media enquiries on the remarks by Chris Patten, a spokesman for the Office of the Chief Executive Leung Chun-ying said on 4 September 2014 that none of the Governors of Hong Kong had been elected by Hong Kong people under the British rule; that the Sino-British Joint Declaration did not provide for universal suffrage; and that Hong Kong's constitutional development under the Basic Law was an internal affair of China.

In an official response to China's 31 August decision, the British government said, "We welcome the confirmation that China's objective is for the election of Hong Kong's chief executive through universal suffrage." A Chinese Foreign Ministry spokesman expressed "strong dissatisfaction" with the response, saying that the reform was "China's internal affair". Anson Chan and Martin Lee heavily criticised the UK government's acceptance of China's plan for limiting free elections in its former colony of Hong Kong.

After the electoral reform proposal was voted down, British minister Hugo Swire expressed his country's disappointment at the outcome, and said that "a transition to universal suffrage is the best way to guarantee Hong Kong's stability".

== Opinion polling ==
On the question (or variants thereof): "The National People's Congress Standing Committee has set a framework to limit the number of candidates to two or three and require them to have the support of at least half of the 1,200 nominating committee members. Should the Legislative Council pass or veto the government proposal on the election of the chief executive by universal suffrage based on this framework?"

Date(s) conducted	Polling organisation/client	Sample size	Pass	Veto	Undecided	Lead
11–15 Jun	CSG/Cable TV	1,005	44%	38%	18%	6%
8–12 Jun	CUHK CCPOS/HKU POP/HKPU CSPS	1,123	45%	41%	14%	4%
5–9 Jun	CUHK CCPOS/HKU POP/HKPU CSPS	1,117	41%	44%	15%	3%
2–6 Jun	CUHK CCPOS/HKU POP/HKPU CSPS	1,118	43%	43%	15%	Tied
31 May–5 Jun	LU PGP/Public Opinion Concern Group	1,051	49%	42%	4%	7%
31 May	Pan-democrats meeting with Beijing officials in Shenzhen					
14–21 May	CSG/Cable TV	1,000	44%	41%	16%	3%
13–20 May	CUHK CCPOS	1,041	45%	43%	11%	2%
30 Apr–7 May	CSG/Cable TV	1,004	46%	40%	14%	6%
27 Apr–2 May	LU PGP/Public Opinion Concern Group	1,022	51%	42%	2%	9%
22–28 Apr	CUHK CCPOS/HKU POP/HKPU CSPS/Now TV	1,167	47%	38%	16%	9%
23–26 Apr	LU PGP/TVB	1,112	51%	38%	11%	13%
22–24 Apr	CSG/Cable TV	505	49%	38%	13%	11%
22 Apr	Final package of reform proposals tabled at the Legislative Council					
2–9 Mar	CUHK CCPOS	1,009	40%	47%	13%	7%
26 Jan–1 Feb	LU PGP/Public Opinion Concern Group	1,004	50%	38%	7%	12%
7–8 Jan	HKU POP/Ming Pao	500	56%	34%	9%	22%
2014
8–20 Dec	CHCDJC	1,000	47%	53%	—N/a	6%
8–12 Dec	CUHK CCPOS	1,011	38%	43%	19%	5%
5–11 Nov	CUHK CCPOS	1,030	36%	47%	17%	11%
31 Oct–5 Nov	HKU POP/Ming Pao	1,005	53%	34%	13%	19%
8–15 Oct	CUHK CCPOS	802	36%	49%	15%	13%
29 Sep	PolyU CSPS	729	29%	62%	9%	33%
28 Sep	Beginning of the Umbrella Movement					
11–17 Sep	CUHK CCPOS	1,006	29%	54%	17%	25%
4–11 Sep	HKU POP/South China Morning Post	1,008	39%	48%	13%	9%
5–10 Sep	LU PGP/Public Opinion Concern Group	1,036	53%	38%	5%	15%
1–6 Sep	HKU POP/Ming Pao	1,011	52%	37%	11%	15%
31 Aug–3 Sep	LU PGP/TVB	1,114	45%	41%	14%	3%
31 Aug	National People's Congress Standing Committee decision					
6–8, 11 Aug	CUHK CCPOS/HongKong2020	824	30%	60%	10%	30%
21–27 Jul	LU PGP/Public Opinion Concern Group	1,017	55%	37%	5%	18%
19–26 May	LU PGP/Public Opinion Concern Group	1,020	54%	35%	5%	19%
14–20 May	HKU POP/Ming Pao	1,011	57%	28%	16%	29%
21–24 Jan	HKU POP/Ming Pao	1,017	49%	32%	6%	17%
2013
2–4 Oct	HKU POP/Ming Pao	1,016	48%	36%	7%	12%
3–5 Jul	HKU POP/Ming Pao	1,016	43%	38%	8%	5%
15–18 Apr	HKU POP/Ming Pao	1,023	44%	35%	6%	9%

== See also ==
- Democratic development in Hong Kong
- 2012 Dual Universal Suffrage (Hong Kong)

== Related documents ==
- Methods for Selecting the Chief Executive in 2017 and for Forming the Legislative Council in 2016 Consultation Document
- Report by the Chief Executive of the Hong Kong Special Administrative Region to the Standing Committee of the National People's Congress on whether there is a need to amend the methods for selecting the Chief Executive of the Hong Kong Special Administrative Region in 2017 and for forming the Legislative Council of the Hong Kong Special Administrative Region in 2016
- Decision of the Standing Committee of the National People's Congress on Issues Relating to the Selection of the Chief Executive of the Hong Kong Special Administrative Region by Universal Suffrage and on the Method for Forming the Legislative Council of the Hong Kong Special Administrative Region in the Year 2016
- Consultation Document on the Method for Selecting the Chief Executive by Universal Suffrage (Consultation Document)
- Report on the Recent Community and Political Situation in Hong Kong
