= Allen Lee =

Hong Kong politician (1940–2020)

Allen Lee Peng-fei CBE, JP
- 李鵬飛
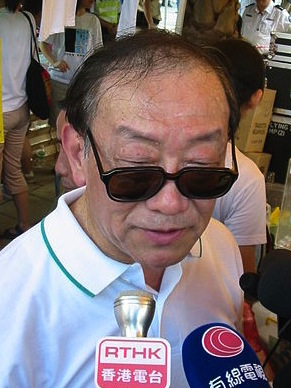
- Lee at the 1 July march in 2008

Chairman of the Liberal Party
- In office 26 June 1993 – 5 December 1998
- Succeeded by: James Tien

Unofficial Member of the Executive Council
- In office 21 June 1985 – 7 October 1992
- Appointed by: Sir Edward Youde

Senior Member of the Legislative Council
- In office 25 August 1988 – 15 November 1991
- Appointed by: Sir David Wilson
- Preceded by: Lydia Dunn

Member of the Legislative Council
- In office 1 September 1978 – 31 July 1995
- Appointed by: Sir Edward Youde; Sir David Wilson
- In office 11 October 1995 – 30 June 1997
- Constituency: New Territories North-east
- In office 21 December 1996 – 30 June 1998 (Provisional Legislative Council)

Personal details
- Born: 24 April 1940 Yantai, Shandong, China
- Died: 15 May 2020 (aged 80) Hong Kong
- Party: Liberal (1993–2003)
- Spouse: Maria Choi Yuen-ha
- Children: 3
- Education: University of Michigan (BS)
- Occupation: Company director politician

Allen Lee Peng-fei, CBE, JP (Chinese: 李鵬飛; 24 April 1940 – 15 May 2020) was a Hong Kong industrialist, politician and political commentator. He was a member of the Legislative Council of Hong Kong, serving from 1978 to 1997 and was the Senior Member of the legislature from 1988 to 1991. He was also an unofficial member of the Executive Council of Hong Kong from 1986 to 1992. He was the founding chairman of the Liberal Party, a pro-business party in 1993 until he retired after he lost the 1998 election. After his retirement, he became a political commentator and hosted Legco Review, a RTHK weekly TV programme on the news about Legislative Council, among several other posts.

== Early life and education ==
Lee was born on 24 April 1940 in Yantai, Shandong, China to a Chinese businessman. His parents had four children. He followed his family when they moved to Shanghai to evade war and spent most of his childhood there. His father became a merchant in Shanghai and had represented General Motors, among other US companies in China. He later moved to the United States in 1948. Lee had led an independent life and did not know much about his absent father because they seldom stayed together. Lee knew that his father had married several times, which made him feel rather uneasy.

At the age of 14, he was a leader of the Communist Youth League, and organised marches denouncing the United States because of its involvement in the Korean War. In May 1954, his mother sent him to Hong Kong where he attended and graduated from Pui Ying Secondary School. After graduation, he had planned to continue his studies at National Taiwan University but his father intended for him to go to the United States. Subsequently, he was sent to the United States and began learning English in Dayton, Ohio. He was later enrolled in the University of Michigan and studied electronics engineering there.

== Business career ==
After his graduation, he worked at the Lockheed Aircraft's Electronics Department in California. In 1966, he was appointed by the company to open a branch factory in Hong Kong. Due to a shortage of talented manpower, Lee was invited to serve as the factory's Test Engineer and Training Engineer.

In 1970, Lee moved on to work for Ampex as Test Engineering Manager through a friend's introduction and was promised the position of general manager after two years of satisfactory performance. He helped the company to set up a factory in Taiwan and a new Design Engineering Department. In 1973/74, Lee became the first Chinese to have ever been appointed general manager. During the time when he was general manager, the 1973 Oil Crisis occurred, which resulted in a sharp decrease in the number of orders. He managed to arrange the workers to take a three-day work week and survived the dire situation after half-year. He also improved the working environment by installing air-conditioning and waxing the floor tiles. He offered the workers a remuneration package with a wage that was 10% above the industry average.

He left Ampex and became Tang Hsiang Chien's business partner in 1985, establishing the Meadville Holdings Limited to produce printed circuits board (PCB). Lee and Tang were then chairman and deputy chairman of the Federation of Hong Kong Industries respectively. Lee also set up a copper-clad laminate factory in Dongguan for Meadville.

Simultaneously, Lee and his ex-colleagues from Ampex set up a trading firm that sold copper foils to manufacturers PCBs and cooper-clad laminates. In 1991, he cooperated with a Japanese buyer and set up Jada Electronics Limited, focusing on selling cooper-clad laminates and copper foils, in which partnership had continued until today.

== Political career ==
=== Member of Executive and Legislative Councils ===
In the late 1970s, Hong Kong Governor Sir Murray MacLehose established the Committee of Economic Diversification to advance Hong Kong's high technology development. Governor MacLehose visited Ampex in 1977 and listened to Lee's outlook on Hong Kong's electronic industry. Lee recommended the Governor to build a technology park, but he was snubbed because high technology may incur a high risk. Hong Kong as a result failed to take a head start and was surpassed by South Korea and Taiwan which had built the Hsinchu Science Park. Lee denounced the government for mismatching talents by appointing an Administrative Officer to be the Secretary for Trade and Industry.

In 1978, Lee became the youngest appointee to the Legislative Council of Hong Kong by Sir Murray MacLehose, at the age of 38. He had sat on the Consumer Council and Electronics Industry Training Board before. He also held many public positions, including chairman of the Hong Kong Productivity Council and member of the Vocational Training Council. In 1986, Governor Sir Edward Youde asked him to serve on the Executive Council of Hong Kong.

During his political career, he witnessed the Sino-British negotiations over Hong Kong's future after 1997. In May 1983, Allen Lee led a delegation of young professionals to Beijing, which included legislators Stephen Cheong and Selina Chow, as well as barristers Martin Lee and Andrew Li, architect Edward Ho, doctor Natalus Yuen, journalist Mary Lee, Wing On Bank's Dr. Philip Kwok and Albert Kwok, financier Leung Kwok-kwong and merchant Christopher Leong. They were greeted by the General Secretary of the Chinese Communist Party Xi Zhongxun. In the delegation, they expressed their wish to keep the status quo in Hong Kong as it was "the best guarantee to maintaining the prosperity and stability of Hong Kong". They also sought to extend the British rule by 15 to 30 years. He returned to Beijing in October 1983 and was met by the National Security Bureau Zhuang Xin and former Foreign Trade Minister Li Qiang. In the meeting he was told the demands of the young professionals were rejected.

During the Sino-British negotiations over the future of Hong Kong and the drafting of the Sino-British Joint Declaration in December 1984, Lee joined the delegation of Office of the Unofficial Members of the Executive and Legislative Councils (UMELCO) to meet with the British politicians in London and raised concerns about the Joint Declaration. The UMELCO also attempted to mobilise public opinion on the terms of the Sino-British agreement and made known Hong Kong's views to both the British and Chinese governments. Legislative Council member Roger Lobo moved a motion to demand a debate in the Legislative Council on the draft of Sino-British Joint Declaration in February 1984. It was backed by Allen Lee.

=== Senior member and Liberal Party chairman ===
From 1988 to 1991, Lee was the Senior Member of the Legislative Council, succeeding retiring Dame Lydia Dunn. After the Tiananmen Square massacre in June 1989, Lee joined the liberals to launch the Hong Kong People Saving Hong Kong campaign to press Britain to open its doors to all its colonial subjects here and grant them full British passports before the colony is handed back to China in 1997. He and the UMELCO also made concession to the liberals, to agree on a compromised model of a more democratic political system after 1997 in the drafting of the Hong Kong Basic Law.

In the wake of the landslide victory of the liberal forces led by the United Democrats of Hong Kong (UDHK) in the first ever direct election of the Legislative Council in 1991, Lee formed the Co-operative Resources Centre (CRC), a conservative parliamentary group with other appointed and indirectly elected members from the business sectors. He subsequently resigned as Senior Member among accusation of conflict of roles. The CRC later transformed into the Liberal Party in 1993, where he was the founding chairman.

In 1992, he resigned from the Executive Council with other unofficial members after Governor Chris Patten took office. He soon found himself aligned with the Beijing government in opposition to Patten's reform proposals which largely expanded the electorates for the 1995 Legislative Council election. He sought to resolve the Sino-Hong Kong confrontation through negotiations. Allen Lee's Liberal Party and its allies tried to amend the Patten proposals and was backed by Lu Ping, Director of the Hong Kong and Macao Affairs Office. However, with the support of the pro-democracy camp, Patten's proposals were narrowly passed. For this event, Jonathan Dimbleby described him as a "weather vane" in his book The Last Governor.

In the 1995 Legislative Council election, Lee ran in the New Territories North-east. He returned to the Legislative Council by receiving 15,216 votes, 34.82% of the ballots, gaining the only seat for the Liberal Party and becoming the sole conservative candidate to be directly elected. He became closer to the Beijing authorities, being appointed as Hong Kong Affairs Adviser, member of the Preparatory Committee and became member of the Provisional Legislative Council (PLC), a provisional legislature installed by Beijing countering the 1995 elected colonial legislature. He was also made a delegate of the Chinese national legislature, the National People's Congress (NPC) in late 1997.

In 1998, Lee ran in New Territories East in the first Legislative Council election after the handover of Hong Kong but was narrowly beaten by pro-democratic candidate Cyd Ho, receiving 33,858 votes, 10.25% of the ballots. The defeat marked the end of his political career, as he announced his retirement as Liberal Party chairman after the election results. He stepped down in December 1998 and was succeeded by James Tien.

== Media career and later life ==
After his retirement, he became involved in the mass media, taking up posts as TV presenter and radio host. Lee hosted Legco Review, a RTHK weekly TV programme on the news about Legislative Council from 2001 until his retirement in March 2018, among several other posts. He became more open to speaking out about his support in democracy and universal suffrage and his criticism of the HKSAR and Chinese governments. He joined the democrats in the 1 July massive protest of 2003 against the legislation of the Hong Kong Basic Law Article 23. He quit the Liberal Party in 2003 over the party leadership's decision to drop its commitment to support universal suffrage of the Chief Executive election in 2007 in its manifesto.

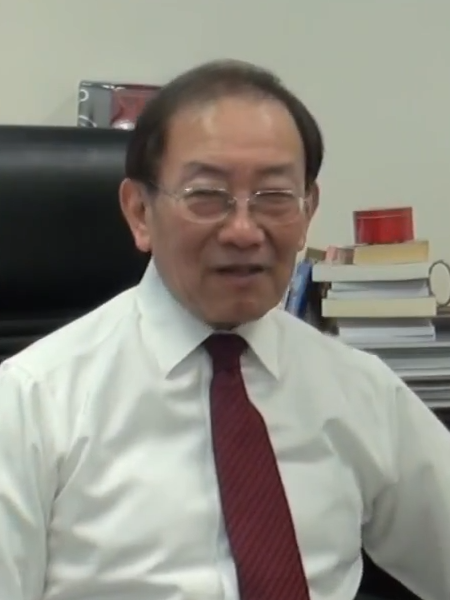
Lee in 2011

In 2004, Lee temporarily replaced Albert Cheng as the host of Teacup in the Storm, Hong Kong's most prominent current affairs programme on Commercial Radio Hong Kong. Cheng resigned because he had been under pressure from pro-Beijing businessmen to stop being critical of the Beijing government. Lee also resigned two weeks later on 19 May as the radio host citing the same reason, following another anti-government critic Wong Yuk-man who also worked at the Commercial Radio as a talk show host. Lee claimed that one Mainland official had called him at night, praising his wife and daughter before saying that he wanted to talk about his radio show. Lee said his decision to quit was also driven by the fear of possible harassment of his family. The successive resignations of the three hosts sparked a heated political controversy related to press freedom and media self-censorship. Simultaneously, Lee also quit as the delegate of the National People's Congress in 2004, saying that he had faced pressure not to speak openly.

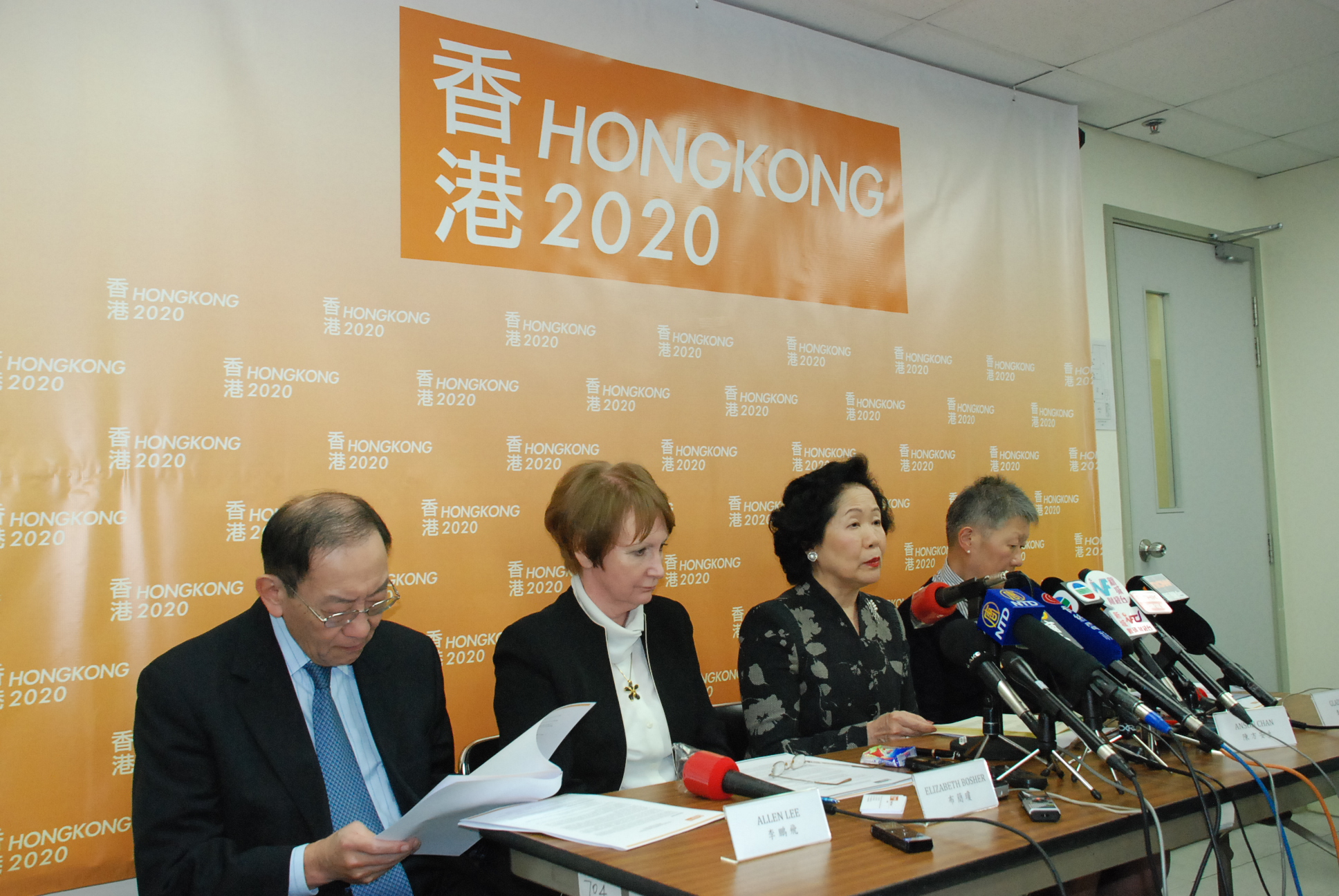
Lee (L) at the press conference of establishment of Hong Kong 2020 led by Anson Chan

In 2013, Lee joined the political group Hong Kong 2020 spearheaded by former Chief Secretary Anson Chan to provide a platform for soliciting views towards consensus on the constitutional changes needed to achieve full universal suffrage in the Chief Executive election in 2017 and the Legislative Council elections in 2020. Lee quitting after a year, citing conflict of interest concerns.

In July 2019, Lee issued a joint statement with other Liberal Party grandees calling on Chief Executive Carrie Lam to officially withdraw the controversial extradition bill which sparked the massive anti-government protests since June, as well as set up an independent commission of inquiry and engage in meaningful dialogue with the public.

== Death ==
On 19 May 2020, his family announced that Allen Lee had died on 15 May, at the age of 80.

== See also ==
- Censorship in Hong Kong
- Media of Hong Kong

== Publications ==
- 不准錄音 ("No Recording"). SCMP Smart Publishing. 2002. ISBN 978-9621784575
- 風雨三十年──李鵬飛回憶錄 (Memoirs by Allen Lee). Cup Magazine Publishing. 2004. ISBN 978-9889775476

Political offices
Preceded by Chen Shou-lum	Chairman of Hong Kong Productivity Council; 1982–1985	Succeeded by Graham Cheng
Legislative Council of Hong Kong
Preceded by Lydia Dunn	Senior Chinese Member; 1988–1992	Office abolished
Preceded by Lydia Dunn	Senior Member; 1988–1992	Office abolished
New office	Senior Member in Legislative Council; 1992–1997	Succeeded by Wong Siu-yee
Preceded by Fung Chi-wood as Representative for New Territories North	Member of Legislative Council; Representative for New Territories North-east; 1995–1997	Replaced by Provisional Legislative Council
New parliament	Member of Provisional Legislative Council; 1997–1998	Replaced by Legislative Council
Party political offices
New political party	Chairman of the Liberal Party; 1993–1998	Succeeded by James Tien
