= Barrie Wiggham =

British senior civil servant in Hong Kong

Edward Barrie Wiggham, CBE JP (born 1937) is a former British senior civil servant in the Hong Kong government. He was the Secretary for the Civil Service from 1990 to 1993.

== Biography ==
Wiggham was born in 1937 and was graduated from the Oxford University in Modern Languages in 1961. From 1956 to 1958, he served in the military in Cyprus. He moved to Hong Kong in 1961 to learn Chinese. Besides that he spoke also French and German. He joined the Hong Kong government and worked in the Urban Services Department and New Territories Administration before he was Deputy Director of Commerce in 1970. He subsequently served as Principal Assistant Financial Secretary, Deputy Secretary for the New Territories.

In the late 1970s, Wiggham was the head of the Home Affairs Information Branch in charge of overt propaganda for the colony. He was also the first chairman of the secret body called the Standing Committee On Pressure Groups (SCOPG) set up in 1978 which was responsible for coordinating government surveillance of any protest or campaigning group and of mounting counter-attacks.

He was member of the Sino-British Joint Liaison Group dealing with the implementation of the Sino-British Joint Declaration over Hong Kong's sovereignty after 1997. He was appointed Secretary for General Duties in 1986. After the Tiananmen massacre in 1989, Wiggham publicly asked for major changes to draft Basic Law of Hong Kong. He requested the Chinese authorities to delay the promulgation of the Basic Law scheduled in 1990 and not to station the People's Liberation Army in future Hong Kong in August. However his suggestions were not adopted.

In 1990, he was appointed Secretary for the Civil Service and official member of the Executive Council of Hong Kong. As Hong Kong's pro-democracy leader Martin Lee called out the British for the betrayal as it handed Hong Kong over to China and refused to introduce a democratic system in Hong Kong, Wiggham defended London by saying that it would be counterproductive to develop democratic institutions that China might dismantle. He was made Commander of the Order of the British Empire (CBE) in 1991.

In 1993, Wiggham was appointed to the new position of the Hong Kong Commissioner for Economic and Trade Affairs, US. His $12 million mansion in Washington however caused controversy in the Legislative Council of Hong Kong. His position of Secretary for the Civil Service was replaced by Anson Chan, who became the first Chinese and first woman to take such position.

Government offices
Preceded by Harnam Singh Grewal	Secretary for the Civil Service; 1990–1993	Succeeded by Anson Chan
