= Anson Chan =

Former Hong Kong senior civil servant and politician

The Honourable Anson Chan Fang On-sang GBM GCMG CBE JP
- 陳方安生
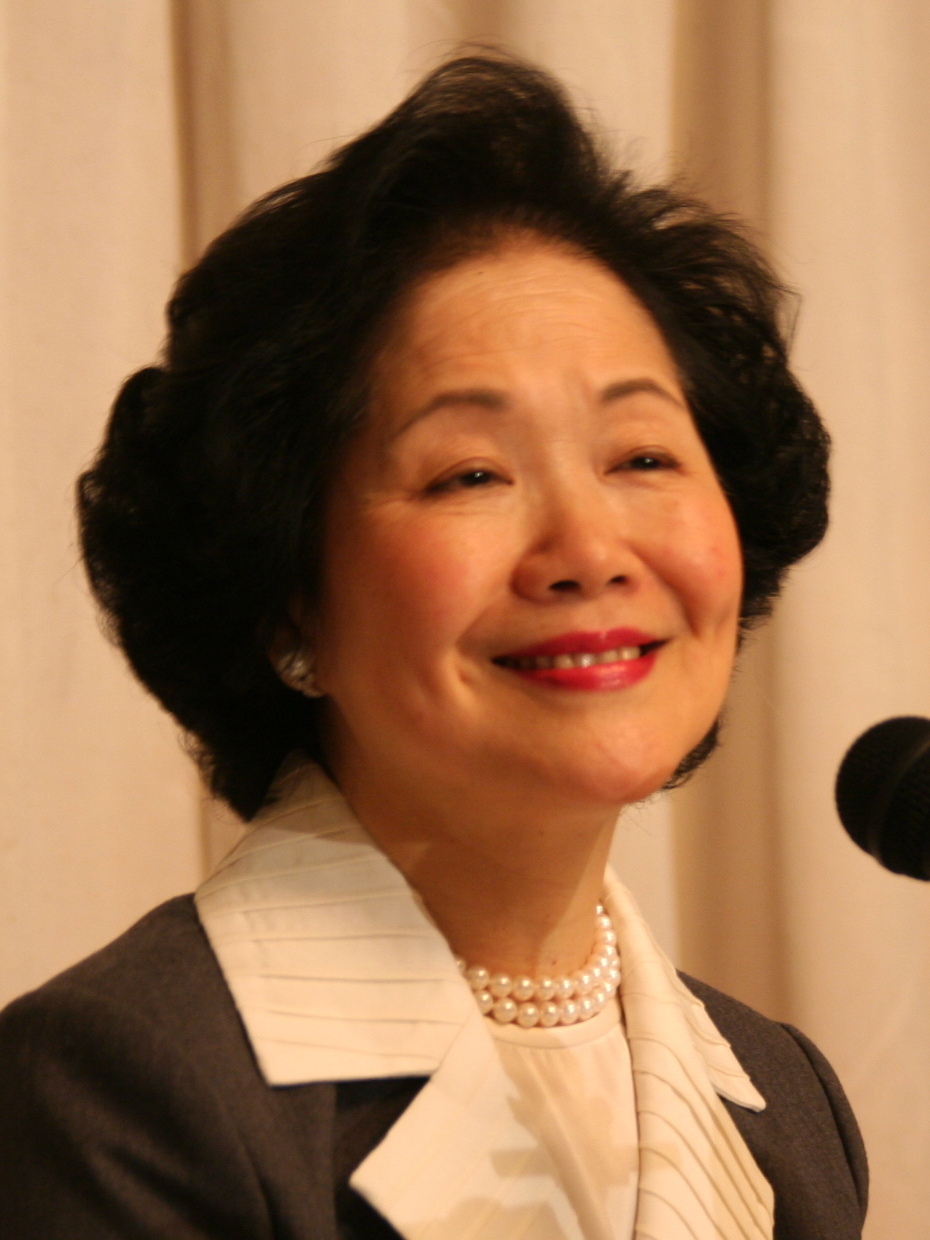
- Chan in 2005

Chief Secretary of Hong Kong
- In office 29 November 1993 – 30 April 2001
- Monarch: Elizabeth II (until 1997)
- Governor: Chris Patten (until 1997)
- Chief Executive: Tung Chee-hwa (from 1997)
- Preceded by: Sir David Ford
- Succeeded by: Sir Donald Tsang

7th Secretary for the Civil Service
- In office 19 April 1993 – 23 October 1993
- Monarch: Elizabeth II
- Governor: Chris Patten
- Preceded by: Edward Barrie Wiggham
- Succeeded by: Michael Sze

5th Secretary for Economic Services
- In office 23 March 1987 – 19 April 1993
- Monarch: Elizabeth II
- Governor: Sir David Wilson; Chris Patten
- Preceded by: John Francis Yaxley
- Succeeded by: Gordon Siu

Member of the Legislative Council
- In office 3 December 2007 – 30 September 2008
- Preceded by: Ma Lik
- Succeeded by: Regina Ip
- Constituency: Hong Kong Island
- In office 29 November 1993 – 31 July 1995
- Appointed by: Chris Patten
- Constituency: Official (as Chief Secretary)
- In office 11 October 1989 – 22 August 1991
- Appointed by: Sir David Wilson
- Constituency: Official (as Secretary for Economic Services)

Personal details
- Born: 17 January 1940 (age 86) Shanghai, China
- Spouse: Archibald Chan (m. 1963; died 2010)
- Relations: Fang Zhaoling (mother); Harry Fang (uncle)
- Children: 2
- Education: Sacred Heart Canossian College; St. Paul's Convent School
- Alma mater: University of Hong Kong (BA); Tufts University

Anson Chan
- Traditional Chinese: 陳方安生
- Simplified Chinese: 陈方安生
Transcriptions
Standard Mandarin
- Hanyu Pinyin: Chén-Fāng Ānshēng
- Wade–Giles: Chʻên^{2}-Fang^{1} An^{1}-shêng^{1}
Yue: Cantonese
- Yale Romanization: Chàhn-Fōng Ōnsāng
- Jyutping: Can4-Fong1 On1sang1

Anson Maria Elizabeth Chan Fang On-sang, GBM, GCMG, CBE, JP (Chinese: 陳方安生; née Fang; born 17 January 1940) is a retired Hong Kong politician, civil servant and stateswoman who was the first ethnic Chinese and woman to serve as Chief Secretary, the second-highest position in both the British colonial government and the Hong Kong SAR government under the Chinese sovereignty from 1993 until she retired from the government in 2001, sparking speculations of her growing rift with Chief Executive Tung Chee-hwa.

Enjoying wide popularity during her tenure and often dubbed as "Iron Lady" and the "Conscience of Hong Kong", Chan became increasingly outspoken about pushing for a faster pace of the democratisation in Hong Kong and defending the autonomy of Hong Kong. Supported by the pan-democracy camp, she stood in the 2007 Hong Kong Island by-election and briefly served as member of the Legislative Council. After her retirement in 2008, she continued to lobby domestically and internationally for democracy and autonomy of Hong Kong, until her retirement from public life entirely in 2020.

== Early life ==
Anson Fang was born in Shanghai into an affluent family in 1940. Her father Fang Shin-hau was a banker and textile businessman who moved his family to the British colony of Hong Kong in 1948 on the eve of the Communist victory of the Chinese Civil War. Fang Shin-hau died suddenly in 1950 aged 36 when Anson was only ten, leaving eight children to her mother Fang Zhaoling. Anson's mother took the eldest sons off to England to oversee their education, leaving the rest in the hands of Anson's paternal grandmother and some uncles and aunts.

Her paternal grandfather, Fang Zhenwu, was a Kuomintang general who fought in the Second Sino-Japanese War, while her uncle, Sir Harry Fang Sin-yang was a well-known orthopaedic surgeon and served as an appointed member of the Legislative Council of Hong Kong from 1974 to 1985. Her mother Fang Zhaoling who was also a Chinese painting master not only shouldered the responsibility of raising her children, but also tried to pursue her career as an artist.

Anson was educated at the Sacred Heart Canossian College and studied English literature at the University of Hong Kong. She put herself through university by working as a private tutor and for a year as a clerk at Queen Mary Hospital. Along with studies, she was keen on amateur dramatics, and it was through this that she met her future husband, Archibald Chan Tai-wing. She began work on a social work diploma, but later changed her mind and joined the Hong Kong Civil Service in 1962. The following year, she married Archie, who became a science teacher at St Joseph's College.

== Colonial administration career ==
When Chan joined the administrative service cadet in 1962, she was one of only two women to join the civil service at that time. Her salary was reportedly one-quarter that paid to men of equivalent grade. Afterwards, she progressed to the Economics Section of the Finance Branch in 1962, followed by the Department of Agriculture and Fisheries, then the Department of Commerce and Industry, and later back to Finance. In 1970, she became Assistant Financial Secretary in the Finance Branch of the Colonial Secretary, the first woman to attain that post. She became a senior administrative officer in 1970. During this period she helped set up the Association of Female Senior Government Officers to fight for better rights for women civil servants, notably pushing for wage parity with men.

=== Director of Social Welfare ===
Chan became the first female civil service director when appointed Director of Social Welfare in 1984. During her tenure, she was severely criticised by media for her handling of a child custody case in 1986, popularly known as the Kwok Ah-nui incident. An investigation by unofficial members of the Executive Council found that Chan had "acted within the law" in respect of her extreme powers, but recommended changes to the law and to the Social Welfare Department's procedures to prevent re-occurrence of similar cases. She later admitted that the media pressure had made her "very upset" and this led to keep her distance from the press, at least for a few years.

=== Chief Secretary ===
From 1987 to 1993, she was Secretary for Economic Services. She served as Secretary for the Civil Service from April to October 1993 before becoming the 30th and last Chief Secretary, the head of the Hong Kong civil service, in November 1993. She mainly oversaw the localisation of the civil service during her time in this position. From 1994, she headed the Airport Development Steering Committee overseeing the construction of the new Chek Lap Kok Airport.

Chan was the first woman and the first ethnic Chinese to hold the second-highest governmental position in Hong Kong. The highest governmental position, the Governor, was always held by Britons before Hong Kong's handover to People's Republic of China. Chan was often described during this era as an "Iron Lady", with "an iron fist in a velvet glove". Chan was lauded as the most powerful woman in Asia for her role as the deputy of British Governor Chris Patten, and later first Chief Executive of the SAR Tung Chee-hwa. She was considered most trusted high official in Hong Kong by both the UK and PRC government to appoint her to the head of the civil service, before and after the handover of Hong Kong.

In the run-up to the handover of Hong Kong, she was often the 'face of Hong Kong', dispatched to reassure the wider world that the territory would not implode upon its return to China and that civil liberties would be upheld. Her confidence reassured many around the globe.

Within Hong Kong she had wide public support to be the first Chief Executive in the new administration but announced in October 1996 that she would not seek the role.

== SAR administration career ==
After Hong Kong's handover to China on 1 July 1997, Chan stayed on as head of the civil service under then Chief Executive Tung Chee-hwa, a valuable sign of stability and continuity for the new administration. She was highly regarded: one British-born civil servant said that "nothing would work without her", also noting that "Tung needs her more than she needs him."

Chan was loyal in the main but her public utterances were occasionally at odds with Tung. It was enough to earn her a certain independence and the epithet of "Hong Kong's Conscience". In contrast to the more conservative Tung, Chan showed the greater support for democracy and advocated a faster pace of democratisation.

In 1998, Chan was somewhat criticised for her role in the monitoring of the new Hong Kong International Airport construction at Chek Lap Kok. The airport had logistical difficulties upon its opening, and some blamed Chan for her lack of supervision.

=== Defence of press freedom ===
When pro-government figures in Hong Kong attacked the Radio Television Hong Kong (RTHK) for being too critical of the Hong Kong and Chinese governments, Chan flew to its defence.

Practise their profession after 1997 as they have practised it, continue to write the stories and editorials that deserve to be written, responsibly, objectively without fear or favour... How well they do their job after the transition will to a very large extent decide how well our other freedoms will be protected.

— Anson Chan on Hong Kong journalists' role after the handover

In the summer of 1999 RTHK became a platform for Taiwan-Mainland China discussions. A local member of the PRC's National People's Congress, Tsang Hin-chi, urged the government-owned radio station to exercise self-censorship and not to provide a platform that expressed the splitting of China; Xu Simin, a member of Chinese People's Political Consultative Conference, urged RTHK to not allow Taiwan's president broadcasts.

On 12 April 2000 Wang Fengchao, deputy director of Central Government's Liaison Office, delivered a speech titled "The Principle of One China and the Taiwan Issue". Wang hinted that Basic Law Article 23 should be enacted as quickly as possible in Hong Kong to protect China against treason and subversion. Chan spoke in a four-hour speech after Wang on the importance of press freedom and publication, as she believed in genuine press freedom without external pressures.

=== Retirement from the government ===
The constant criticism of mainland officials and policies was perceived by many to be one of the main reasons for Beijing to view Chan as a malefactor in Hong Kong politics. In what the Hong Kong media saw as a dressing down for Chan, PRC Vice Premier Qian Qichen told her at a function in Beijing to "better support Tung", after there had been reports of disagreements between the two over the appointment of officials. Chan agreed in 1999 to delay her retirement until June 2002. However, Chan announced her resignation in January 2001, and officially stepped down in April of the same year. In a later interview, Chan said she resigned after she failed to persuade Tung to delay the introduction of the Principal Officials Accountability System, as she believed it was too early to introduce this system when the chief executive and half of the legislature were not directly elected.

== Post-civil service career ==
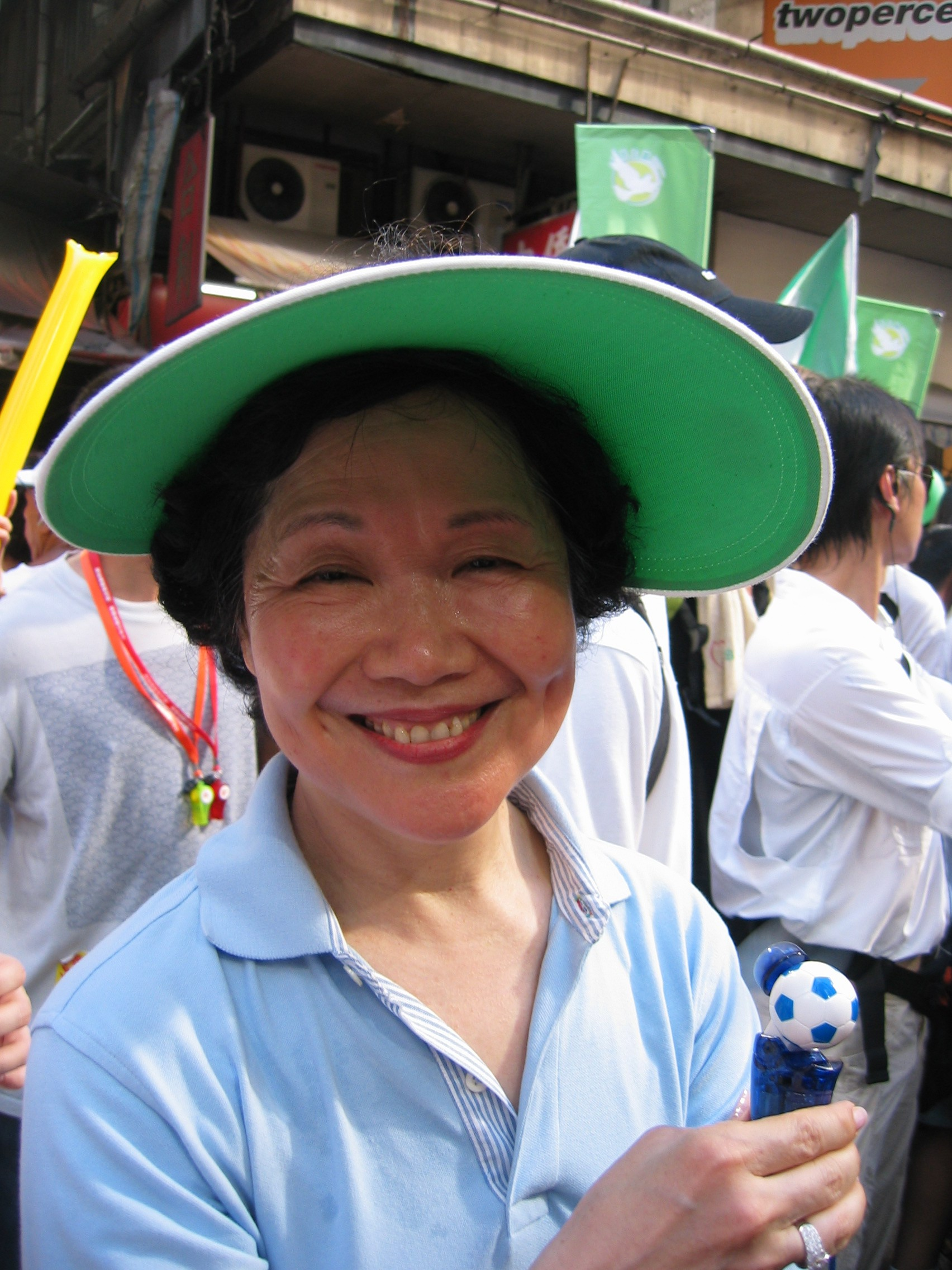
Chan marching for democracy in 2006

After retiring from the civil service, Chan did not often show up in public. However, in December 2005, Chan participated in the protest march for democracy, against Donald Tsang's constitutional reform package and has since participated in subsequent marches for universal suffrage.

In July 2006, she criticised the Commission on Strategic Development, chaired by Donald Tsang, for being "rather slow and unsatisfactory", and announced her intention to start a "Core Group" to push for taking forward the debate on Hong Kong's constitutional reforms. It was later announced that the group would consist of heavyweights including Allen Lee, Christine Loh, Elizabeth Bosher, Professor Johannes Chan, Chandran Nair and Lily Yam Kwan Pui-ying.

On 23 September 2006, in a news conference, Chan proclaimed that she would not run for the position of Chief Executive in 2007.

=== Legislative Council by-election ===
On 11 September 2007, Chan announced that she would run in the December 2007 by-election for the Hong Kong Island seat made vacant by the death of former DAB chairman Ma Lik. During the campaign, she was criticised by Alex Tsui, a former ICAC official who accused Chan of obtaining a 100% mortgage to purchase a flat in 1993 when she was Chief Secretary, suggesting an abuse of power. A City University commentator said the issue marked the start of a smear campaign against Chan, although Chan did not engage in smear-free politics either, accusing her rival Regina Ip, the former Secretary for Security supported by Beijing government, of being a "fake democrat".

Chan was also revealed of having been also taken a seat in the board of Richemont, (where a board member is former legionnaire Taipan Simon Murray) the manufacturer of name brand luxury items, but which at that time also owned a 23% share of British American Tobacco. When this news of her board membership was revealed she immediately resigned from the board of Richemont.

In the early hours of 2 December 2007, Chan was elected in the by-election with 175,874 votes, securing about 55% of the vote. Regina Ip, Chan's main rival, had 137,550 votes.

For this election, Chan spent HK$1.81 million, $330,000 more than Ip. Her two main donors were Sir Quo-wei Lee and his wife, and Hong Kong Democratic Foundation chairman George Cautherley, who donated HK$250,000 each. Next Media chairman Jimmy Lai donated HK$200,000, and the Democratic Party gave HK$65,840 "for services".

On 6 July 2008, Chan announced that she would not be seeking re-election to the Legislative Council at the expiry of her term.

=== International lobbying ===
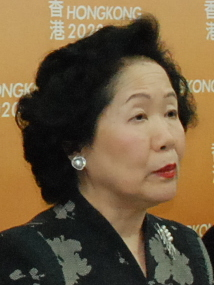
Chan in 2013 during Hong Kong 2020 press conference

On 24 April 2013, Anson Chan launched a group called Hong Kong 2020 on the basis of the former "Core Group" and "Citizen's Commission on Constitutional Development" to monitor and comment on the constitutional reform progress to achieve full universal suffrage for election of the Chief Executive in 2017 and all members of the Legislative Council by 2020.

In April 2014, Anson Chan and Martin Lee, founder of Hong Kong's opposition Democratic Party, went to the United States and met U.S. Vice President Joe Biden, minority leader of the House of Representatives Nancy Pelosi and members of the Congressional-Executive Commission on China. The activists spoke out against Beijing increasing control over Hong Kong and their fear of only candidates picked by Beijing would be allowed to take part in the 2017 Chief Executive election. Lee and Chan also voiced concerns over press freedom in Hong Kong, referring to violent assaults on journalists and alleging that Beijing is pressuring advertisers to shun critical media. Biden underscored Washington's "long-standing support for democracy in Hong Kong and for the city's high degree of autonomy under the 'one country, two systems' framework". China warned the United States against meddling in Hong Kong's internal affairs after Biden met with Chan and Lee. In response, Chinese Ministry of Foreign Affairs said that it "firmly opposes any countries meddling in the city's internal affairs in any way."

In July 2014, Anson Chan and Martin Lee visited the United Kingdom and met with Deputy Prime Minister and the leader of the coalition's junior partner the Liberal Democrats Nick Clegg and raised concerns over China's jurisdiction of the region, and questioning Britain's commitment to Hong Kong's democratic development. Clegg affirmed Britain's commitment to honour the pledge that if China breached the Sino-British Joint Declaration, Britain would "mobilize the international community and pursue every legal and other avenue available". Liu Xiaoming, PRC ambassador to Britain, described Martin Lee and Anson Chan as "bent on undermining the stability of Hong Kong".

In March 2019, Anson Chan and pro-democrat legislators Charles Mok and Dennis Kwok visited the United States and met with Vice President Mike Pence to speak against Beijing's intervention in Hong Kong affairs and the proposed amendments to Hong Kong extradition law which later escalated to the massive anti-government protests. Chan expressed concerns on the special trading relationship between Hong Kong and the United States which guaranteed by the United States–Hong Kong Policy Act of 1992. "If [the US government’s] perception of 'one country, two systems' changes, then we must be concerned that something could be done to change the content of the Hong Kong Policy Act," said Chan. The act stipulated that Hong Kong can enjoy a special trading status separate from that between mainland China and the U.S. because of the one country, two systems principle, under which the city has control over its own political and economic affairs.

In June 2020, aged 80, and following the death of her daughter, Chan announced that she was withdrawing from civic and political life.

== Personal life ==
Among her seven siblings, twin sister Ninson ran a travel agency; brother Philip Fang Shun-sang (b. 1941) worked as a Chinese interpreter at the United Nations in Geneva until 1999 (and died in 2013 after jumping from his home in Lantau). Another brother, David Fang Jin-sheng, was a former orthopaedics lecturer and head of the Hong Kong Academy of Medicine; and another brother, John Fang Meng-sang, is a lawyer. In 2006, John became embroiled in a controversy over the death of his former lover in mysterious circumstances in a flat owned by him in 1995. A coroner's inquest unanimously ruled her death accidental or by misadventure.

She was married to Archibald ("Archie") Chan Tai-wing from 1963 until his death in 2010. Six years her senior, Archibald was a director of Caltex and taught science at St Joseph's College, his alma mater. He was also in the Hong Kong Auxiliary Police from 1987 to 1996, when he retired as a commandant.

The couple had two children, son Andrew Chan Hung-wai and daughter Michelle Chan Wai-ling (who died in 2020, aged 57), and four grandchildren.

On 25 June 2020, she announced that she would retire from political and civic life. In a public statement, she said that she has long promised her children that she would step back from "civic and political engagement and lead a quieter life". The death of her daughter in May 2020 was a driving factor for her retirement because she wanted some "time and space to mourn and recover" and that she wanted to spend as much time with her family, particularly with her granddaughters and son-in-law. Her statement ends with her urging the young people of Hong Kong not to lose hope for the future and to "continue to hold fast to the values that underpins our unique city but to do so in a law abiding and peaceful manner".

== Honours ==
In recognition of her 34 years of public service to the British Crown, Chan was awarded the Hong Kong Grand Bauhinia Medal in 1999.

She was then appointed by Queen Elizabeth II as Honorary Dame Grand Cross of the Order of St Michael and St George in 2002 in recognition of her service with the Hong Kong government before the handover. Such award was usually given only to Governors of Hong Kong before the transfer of sovereignty.

She is an honorary fellow of SOAS University of London.

In recognition of her commitment to democracy and the empowerment of women, and her service as Patron of the university, Asian University for Women conferred upon Anson Chan an honorary doctorate degree on 20 May 2017.

== See also ==
- List of graduates of the University of Hong Kong

Government offices
Preceded by John Chambers	Director of Social Welfare; 1984–1987	Succeeded by Elizabeth Wong
Preceded by John Francis Yaxley	Secretary for Economic Services; 1987–1993	Succeeded by Gordon Siu
Preceded by Edward Barrie Wiggham	Secretary for the Civil Service; 1993	Succeeded by Michael Sze
Preceded by Sir David Ford	Chief Secretary of Hong Kong; 1993–1997	Succeeded by Herself as Chief Secretary for Administration
Preceded by Herself as Chief Secretary of Hong Kong	Chief Secretary for Administration; 1997–2001	Succeeded by Donald Tsang
Legislative Council of Hong Kong
Preceded by Ma Lik	Member of Legislative Council; Representative for Hong Kong Island; 2007–2008	Succeeded by Regina Ip
Order of precedence
Preceded by Ng Hong-mun; Recipient of the Grand Bauhinia Medal	Hong Kong order of precedence Recipient of the Grand Bauhinia Medal	Succeeded by William Purves; Recipient of the Grand Bauhinia Medal
