= Kwok Ah-nui incident =

1986 social welfare case

The Kwok Ah-nui incident (Chinese: 郭亞女事件) is the popular term for a controversial social welfare case in Hong Kong in 1986. The handling of the incident by then-Director of Social Welfare Anson Chan (who later served as Chief Secretary) drew heavy criticism from the Hong Kong press at the time.

== Background ==
The Hong Kong press first reported on a potential child abuse case in 1986. Media reported on a six-year-old child, Kwok Ah-nui, who had allegedly never been outside the family's 200-square-foot Kwai Hing Estate flat. In fact, neighbours reported that the daughter had been taken to the children's playground on rare occasions. It was suspected at the time that the mother, Wong Yuen-siu, was mentally unstable, a claim that was backed by her constant swearing in public.

== Action and conclusion ==
On 9 May 1986, after investigating the case, the Social Welfare Department with authorisation from Anson Chan broke into the housing flat and forcibly separated the child from her mother under a child and mother protection law. The daughter was sent to the Chuk Yuen Children's Reception Centre for examination by a child psychologist. The mother was sent to Kwai Chung Hospital for evaluation. Doctors eventually determined that the mother was schizophrenic, and probably had been for many years, but was fit for discharge.

For years after the incident, the Social Welfare Department, for reasons of child abuse, barred visits between Kwok Ah-nui and her mother, but it was later dropped in favour of no more than two visits a week.

== Reaction ==
The Kwok Ah-nui incident drew heavy discussions and criticism from the Hong Kong media, with many criticising the Social Welfare Department for flagrant abuse of power. Many also questioned the necessity of breaking into a house and separating a family by force.

An UMELCO probe stated that Chan had acted within the law, but suggested amendments to the Protection of Women and Juveniles Ordinance and Mental Health Ordinance to prevent a repeat incident. Chan herself suggested legal changes to limit the powers of the Social Welfare Department.

== Aftermath ==
Afterwards, the Hong Kong government investigated the entire incident, and released a report which suggested a number of rules, such as reserving breaking into a house to forcibly separate a family for the most extreme of circumstances.

As a result of the report findings, the Social Welfare Department established emergency case units and psychological services in an effort to prevent the recurrence of such an incident.

The political career of Anson Chan was also tainted for a time. At the time of the incident, many criticised her for being too authoritarian and inconsiderate, though the criticism soon faded. Chan went on to become the Chief Secretary of Hong Kong, and then a leading democratic activist after her retirement from civil service.

The Kwok Ah-nui incident has long faded into popular memory as a product of the 1980s. Although there are certain social welfare cases in recent times that were lauded as another Kwok Ah-nui Incident, nothing of this magnitude has materialised, and the "breaking and entering" rules that were the centre of controversy have not been practised for a considerable amount of time.
