= The Negotiator =

1998 American crime thriller film by F. Gary Gray

- Theatrical release poster
- Directed by: F. Gary Gray
- Written by: James DeMonaco; Kevin Fox
- Produced by: David Hoberman; Arnon Milchan
- Starring: Samuel L. Jackson; Kevin Spacey; David Morse; Ron Rifkin; John Spencer; J. T. Walsh
- Cinematography: Russell Carpenter
- Edited by: Christian Wagner
- Music by: Graeme Revell
- Production companies: Regency Enterprises; Mandeville Films; New Regency
- Distributed by: Warner Bros.
- Release date: July 29, 1998
- Running time: 139 minutes
- Country: United States
- Language: English
- Budget: $43.5 million
- Box office: $88 million

The Negotiator is a 1998 American crime thriller film directed by F. Gary Gray. It stars Samuel L. Jackson and Kevin Spacey as Chicago Police Department lieutenants who are expert hostage negotiators. The film was produced by Regency Enterprises, Mandeville Films, New Regency and Taurus Films and released in the United States by Warner Bros. on July 29, 1998, receiving generally positive reviews from critics and grossing $88 million worldwide. The film is considered by many to be one of Jackson's most underrated films and one of F. Gary Gray's best films.

== Plot ==
Chicago Police Lieutenant Danny Roman is a top hostage negotiator for the east precinct. His partner, Nate Roenick, warns him that an informant inside the department suspects members of their own unit have embezzled millions from the police disability fund. Before they can meet again, Nate is shot dead, and Danny is lured to the scene and discovered by the police, but is unable to corroborate Nate's story or identify the informant.

Danny is targeted by Internal Affairs Inspector Terence Niebaum, whom Nate's informant believed was involved in the embezzlement. The gun is recovered from a pond and linked to one of Danny's cases, and a search of his home produces evidence of an incriminating offshore bank account, making him the prime suspect in the embezzlement and Nate's murder. Forced to surrender his duty weapon and badge, ostracized by his colleagues, and with charges against him pending, Danny storms into Niebaum's office for a confrontation. When the investigator refuses to cooperate, Danny takes Niebaum, his administrative assistant Maggie, Danny's commander and friend Grant Frost, and con man Rudy Timmons as hostages.

With the building evacuated and placed under siege by his own unit and the FBI, Danny will only speak to fellow negotiator Lieutenant Chris Sabian of the west precinct. He also issues his demands: the render of his badge, a department funeral if he gets killed, and the identities of Nate's informant and killer. Chris, who sees tactical action as a last resort, clashes with Danny's unit, particularly chief Allen Travis and commander Adam Beck. A breach of Niebaum's office backfires when a SWAT marksman refuses to shoot Danny, who captures officers Scott and Markus. Chris takes command of the scene, but Danny seemingly executes Scott to reestablish control.

Danny releases Frost to Chris in exchange for restoring the building's electricity, allowing him to search the files of Niebaum's computer, discovering that Internal Affairs had wiretap recordings of Nate. Believing Niebaum gave fabricated information when he claimed of not having any connections to Nate while he was investigating the fund, Danny lashes out and slaps him in the face. With the help of Rudy and Maggie, Danny discovers the embezzlement scheme: Corrupt officers submitted false disability claims that were processed by an unknown insider on the disability fund's board. Chris claims to have located the informant in an attempt to end the standoff, but Danny realizes he is bluffing when Niebaum's files reveal that Nate himself was the informant.

When Danny threatens to expose Niebaum to sniper fire in his office window, Niebaum admits that Nate gave him wiretaps implicating three of his squadmates in the scheme; Allen, Hellman and Argento. Niebaum was bribed by the guilty officers to cover up their crimes, while Nate refused and was killed afterwards. Niebaum has safely hidden the wiretaps, but the corrupt officers enter through the air vents and open fire, killing Niebaum in the process. Danny fends them off with flashbangs taken from the captured officers, and Niebaum's murder convinces the remaining hostages that Danny is being set up.

Convinced that the police are ineffectual, the FBI assume jurisdiction over the operation, cease negotiations, relieving Chris of his command and ordering a full breach. While Danny prepares for his eventual arrest, Maggie tells him that Niebaum likely kept Nate's wiretaps at home, while Chris reenters the building to warn Danny, who reveals that Scott is unharmed. Chris agrees to help Danny clear his name, and as the building is raided and the other hostages are rescued, Danny disguises himself in Scott's uniform and escapes. He and Chris are unable to locate the wiretaps at Niebaum's home, where the corrupt officers are about to kill Danny, but Frost arrives to negotiate with him alone.

Chris shoots Danny, offering to destroy Roenick's evidence in exchange for a cut of the embezzled funds. Frost agrees, effectively revealing himself as the ringleader of the conspiracy, the insider on the disability fund's board, and Nate's killer. Crushing the floppy disks, Chris gives him and shooting Niebaum's computer, Frost exits the house.

Outside, Frost discovers that Chris deliberately wounded Danny, who broadcasts Frost's entire confession to the awaiting police officers with a walkie talkie radio. Humiliated, Frost attempts to commit suicide, but is shot in the shoulder by Beck and arrested with the other corrupt officers, and Danny narrowly refrains from shooting Frost to avenge Nate. As Danny is loaded into an ambulance with his wife Karen, Chris returns his badge to him and departs.

== Cast ==
- Samuel L. Jackson as Chicago Police Lieutenant Danny Roman
- Kevin Spacey as Chicago Police Lieutenant Chris Sabian
- David Morse as Commander Adam Beck
- Ron Rifkin as Commander Grant Frost
- John Spencer as Police Chief Al Travis
- J. T. Walsh as Inspector Terence Niebaum
- Paul Guilfoyle as Nathan "Nate" Roenick (uncredited)
- Siobhan Fallon as Maggie
- Paul Giamatti as Rudy Timmons
- Regina Taylor as Karen Roman
- Bruce Beatty as Markus
- Michael Cudlitz as Palermo
- Carlos Gómez as Eagle
- Tim Kelleher as Argento
- Dean Norris as Scott
- Nestor Serrano as Hellman
- Doug Spinuzza as Tonray
- Leonard Thomas as Allen
- Stephen Lee as Farley
- Robert David Hall as Cale Wangro
- Geoff Morrell as TV reporter
- Gene Wolande as Morewitz

Tom Bower also appears uncredited as Omar, an unhinged man whom Danny negotiates with at the beginning of the film.

== Production ==
The script was originally pitched to Disney subsidiary Hollywood Pictures, with David Hoberman attached as producer, but Disney placed the film into turnaround, and sold the project to New Regency Productions, who at that time had a distribution deal with Warner Bros. Pictures, with Sylvester Stallone in mind to star. Stallone turned the project down and the role was offered to Samuel L. Jackson, who accepted it.

=== Music ===
The original score was composed by Graeme Revell. Revell described The Negotiator score as difficult due to F. Gary Gray's frequent changes of mind. It took about 2–3 months to complete, but ultimately Revell went with his original compositions, which he felt were the right fit for the film. While he did not consider the score experimental, he was proud of it as a solid example of the genre, believing it effectively drove the film's rhythm.

=== Notes ===
The film is dedicated to J. T. Walsh, who died several months before the film's release.

== Reception ==
=== Box office ===
The Negotiator made $10.2 million in its opening weekend, finishing fourth at the box office, behind Saving Private Ryan, The Parent Trap and There's Something About Mary. It went on to finish with a worldwide gross of $88 million. Warner Bros. spent $40.3 million promoting the film and lost an estimated $13 million after all revenues and expenses were factored together.

=== Critical response ===
On Rotten Tomatoes, The Negotiator holds an approval rating of 74%, based on 58 reviews, with an average rating of 6.7/10. The website's critical consensus reads: "The Negotiator's battle of wits doesn't wholly justify its excessive length, but confident direction by F. Gary Gray and formidable performances makes this a situation audiences won't mind being hostage to." On Metacritic, the film has a weighted average score 62 out of 100, based on 24 critics, indicating "generally favorable reviews". Audiences polled by CinemaScore gave the film an average grade of "A" on an A+ to F scale.

Emanuel Levy of Variety wrote: "Teaming for the first time Kevin Spacey and Samuel L. Jackson, arguably the two best actors of their generation, in perfectly fitting roles is a shrewd move and the best element of this fact-inspired but overwrought thriller." Roger Ebert, in his Chicago Sun-Times review, calls The Negotiator "a triumph of style over story, and of acting over characters...Much of the movie simply consists of closeups of the two of them talking, but it's not simply dialogue because the actors make it more—invest it with conviction and urgency..."

Mick LaSalle, in his less-than-enthusiastic review for the San Francisco Chronicle, had the most praise for Spacey's performance: "Kevin Spacey is the main reason to see The Negotiator...Spacey's special gift is his ability to make sanity look radiant...In The Negotiator, as in L.A. Confidential, he gives us a man uniquely able to accept, face and deal with the truth."

During his 2014 tribute at the Museum of the Moving Image, Kevin Spacey remarked that The Negotiator had stood the test of time, noting that people still approached him on the street asking whether he and Samuel L. Jackson would ever make a sequel. Spacey joked that perhaps they should consider doing one.

=== Accolades ===
Award	Category	Subject	Result
Saturn Award	Best Action or Adventure Film	David Hoberman & Arnon Milchan	Nominated
American Black Film Festival	Black Film Award for Best Film	David Hoberman & Arnon Milchan	Won
American Black Film Festival	Black Film Award for Best Director	F. Gary Gray	Won
American Black Film Festival	Black Film Award for Best Actor	Samuel L. Jackson	Nominated
Blockbuster Entertainment Award	Favorite Actor - Action/Adventure	Samuel L. Jackson	Nominated
NAACP Image Award	Outstanding Actor in a Motion Picture	Samuel L. Jackson	Nominated

== Adaptation ==
The film was remade into Crisis Negotiators, a 2024 Hong Kong film directed by Herman Yau and produced by Andy Lau, starring Sean Lau and Francis Ng in the lead roles, who played the counterparts of Samuel L. Jackson and Kevin Spacey's characters respectively.
