= Hong Kong 2020 =

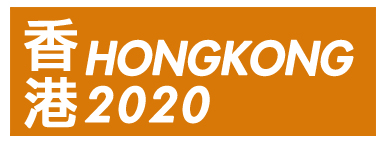
- Formation: 24 April 2013; 13 years ago
- Type: NGO
- Purpose: To achieve full universal suffrage in Hong Kong
- Convenor: Anson Chan
- Affiliations: Pro-democracy camp
- Website: hongkong2020.com

Hong Kong 2020 is a political group launched on 24 April 2013 by Anson Chan, former Chief Secretary for Administration, to provide a platform for soliciting views towards consensus on the constitutional changes needed to achieve full universal suffrage in the election of the Chief Executive in 2017 and the elections for the Legislative Council in 2020.

== Composition ==
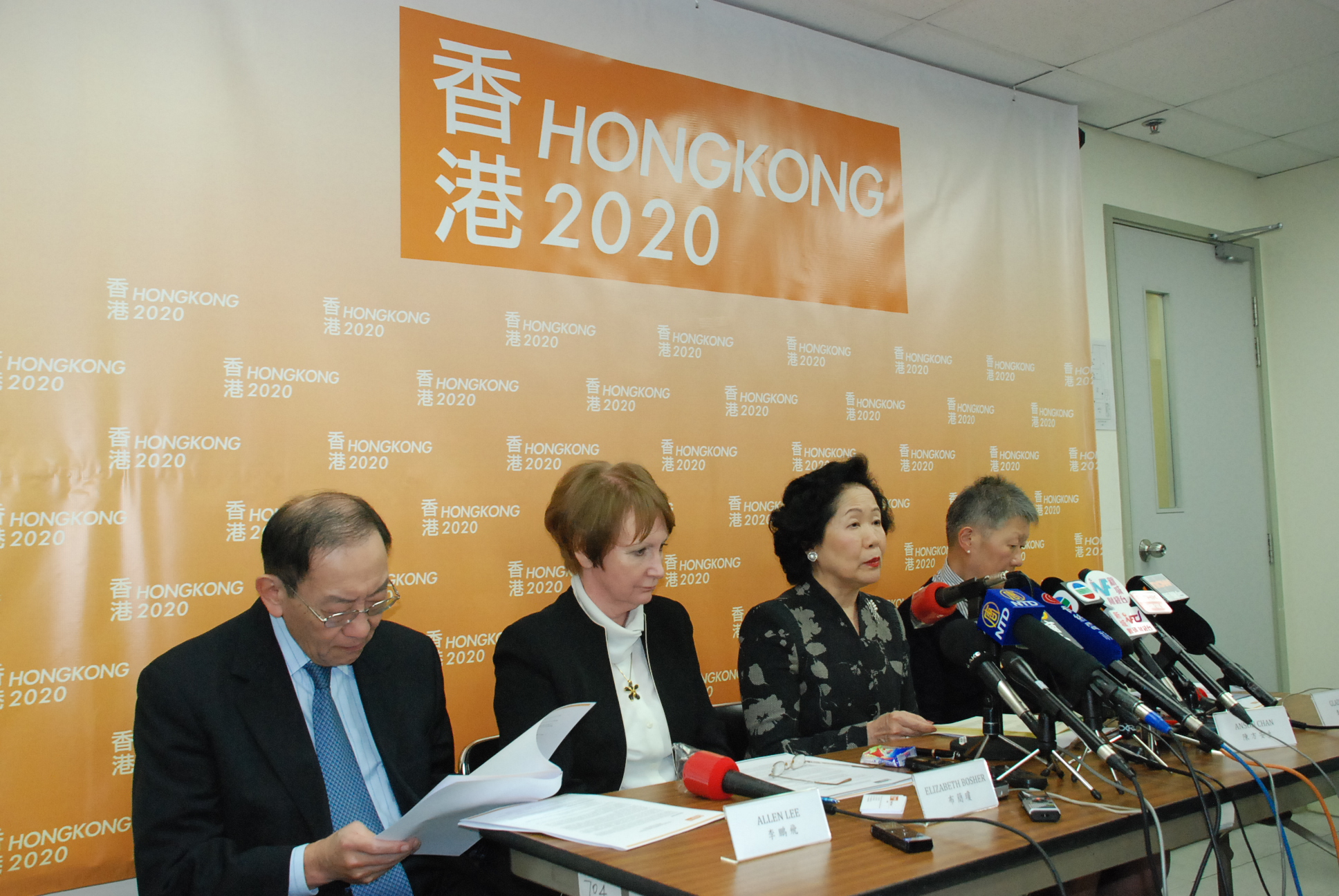
A Press Conference of Hong Kong 2020 in November 2013.

Convenor:

- Anson Chan, GBM, GCMG, CBE, JP

Members:

- Allen Lee Peng-fei, former Legislative Council member and founding chairman of the Liberal Party
- Elizabeth Bosher, former Deputy Secretary for Constitutional Affairs
- George Cautherley, former government official
- Johannes Chan Man-mun, SC
- Gladys Veronica Li, SC

Secretariat:

- Research Director – Lee Wing Tat, former Legislative Council member and chairman of the Democratic Party
- Research Officer – Yu Kwun Wai, member of the Civic Party
- Communications Officer – Matthew Chan

== See also ==
- Hong Kong Basic Law Article 45
- Democratic development in Hong Kong
- Pro-democracy camp
