= Johannes Chan =

Hong Kong legal scholar

Professor Johannes Chan Man-mun SC (Hon)
- 陳文敏
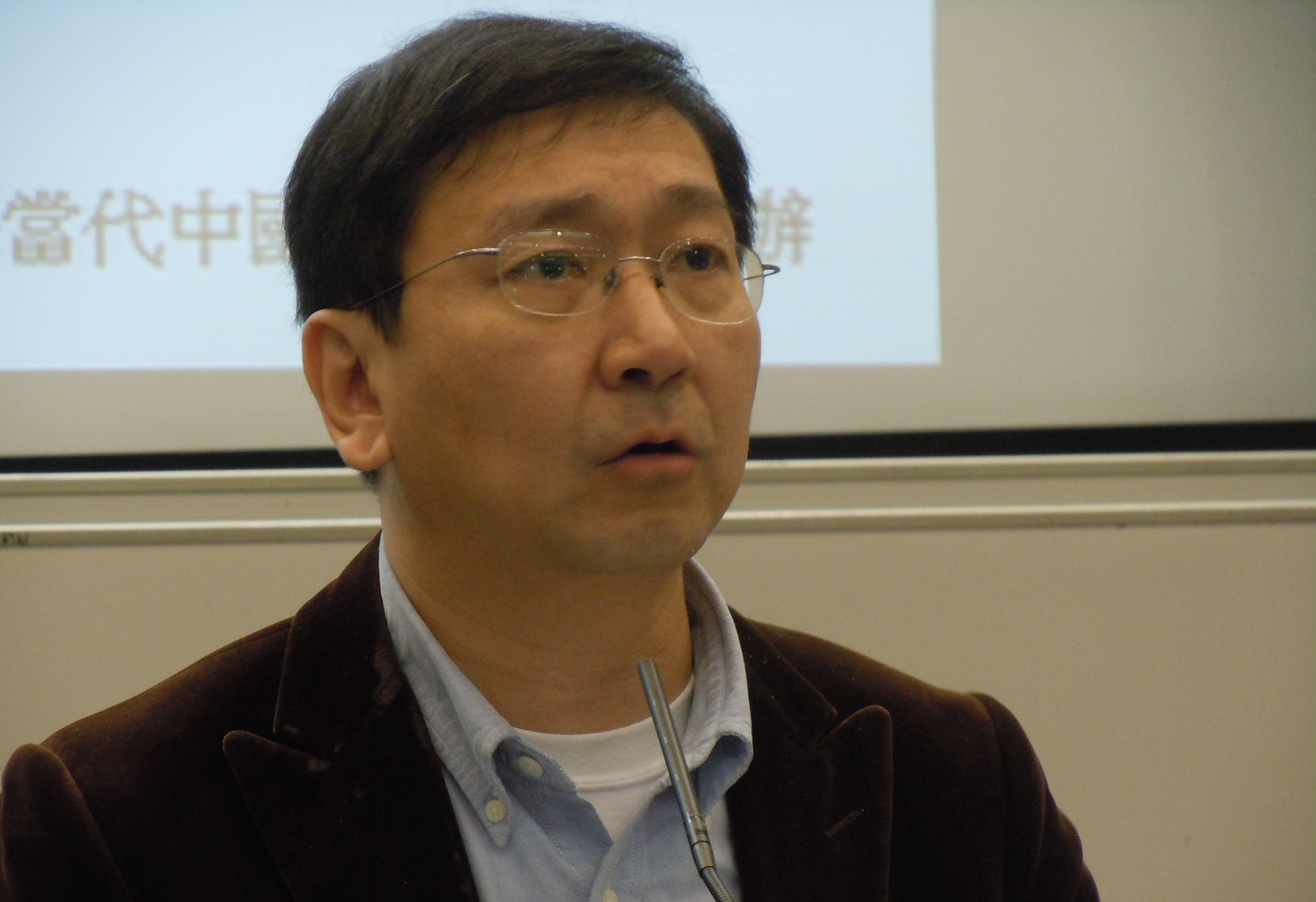
- Education: University of Hong Kong (LLB, PCLL); London School of Economics and Political Science (LLM)
- Occupations: Professor of Law (HKU); Barrister-at-law in HK

Johannes Chan Man-mun (陳文敏) SC (Hon) is an honorary professor at University College London, former chair and professor of law (1998–2021) and former dean of the faculty of law (2002–2014) at the University of Hong Kong. He specialises in human rights, constitutional and administrative law, and is the first and only academic silk ever appointed in Hong Kong. He is credited with transforming the University's Faculty of Law into one of the leading law schools in the world during his tenure as Dean. He was selected by the Hong Kong University Grants Committee as a Prestigious Fellow in Humanities and Social Sciences for his sustained excellence in scholarship. He has held visiting professorships at many leading universities, including the University of Cambridge, University College London, the University of Pennsylvania, the University of New South Wales, and the University of Zurich. He retired from the University of Hong Kong in 2021.

In February 2009, he was banned from entering Macau to give a public lecture, which raised strong responses from both pan-democracy and pro-Beijing parties. In 2015, he was unanimously recommended by a search committee to become the pro-vice-chancellor of the University of Hong Kong, but the recommendation was, exceptionally, not accepted by the university council; the decision was widely criticized as an infringement on academic freedom, believed to have been prompted by Chan's outspoken and liberal political stance. Since the enactment of the National Security Law in Hong Kong in 2020, he has been publicly condemned by the Hong Kong government for his criticisms of legal affairs in the city.

== Early life ==
Chan was born and educated in Hong Kong. He earned his LLB from the University of Hong Kong and his LLM from the London School of Economics and Political Science.

== Career ==
Chan was called to the Hong Kong Bar in September 1982, specialising in public law and human rights. He has appeared as counsel in many leading constitutional law cases, covering a wide spectrum of issues such as free speech, fair trial, election and social welfare rights. In 2003, he was appointed the first honorary senior counsel in Hong Kong, and remains so far the only academic silk in Hong Kong.

Chan joined the University of Hong Kong as a lecturer in 1985, became a professor in 1998, head of the department of law (1999–2002), and dean of the faculty of law (2002–2014). During his deanship, he led the transformation of the Faculty of Law at the University of Hong Kong from a local teaching institution into one of the world's leading law schools, consistently ranked among the top 20 globally. He is also one of the pioneers in offering a common law training program for judges and legal officers in Mainland China, and, in collaboration with UCL and Peking University, introduced a series of rule of law initiatives in the Mainland. Under his leadership, the Human Rights programme has been significantly expanded and has trained graduates from many Asian countries since 1999. He has built up strong and strategic academic and research relations with leading law schools worldwide.

Chan is also a leading academic and has published widely in the field. His book, Law of the Hong Kong Constitution, is a leading treatise on the unique constitution of One Country, Two Systems, in Hong Kong. According to declassified documents at the Public Records Office in 2018, one of his early articles on A Bill of Rights for Hong Kong has significantly influenced the thinking of the UK Foreign and Commonwealth Office and shaped the final format of the Hong Kong Bill of Rights 1991. He was a Herbert Smith Freehills Visiting Professor at University of Cambridge, BOK Visiting International Professor at University of Pennsylvania Law School, and held visiting professorship/fellowship at University College London, University of New South Wales, and Zurich University. His sustained contribution to scholarship was recognized by the Hong Kong University Grants Committee when he was selected Prestigious Fellows in Humanities and Social Sciences in 2019, which was awarded on the basis of sustained excellence in research and scholarship, and by his appointment in the same year to be the Chair of Public Law at the University of Hong Kong, which is the highest recognition of research excellence and is awarded only after the most vigorous external assessment of scholarship, academic achievements and international recognition. Since 2023, he was appointed Honorary Professor of University College London.

Chan has also been an outspoken critic on legal affairs. He was a founding member of the Article 23 Concern Group and Article 45 Concern Group, and has been at the forefront of efforts to oppose the HKSAR Government's bid to pass a national security law in 2003, one that was eventually withdrawn after half a million people took to the streets in protest. He was one of the founders of Hong Kong Human Rights Monitor. Internationally, he has worked on specific issues with many non-governmental organisations such as Amnesty International, Lawyers Committee, the International Committee of the Red Cross and Article 19.

Chan has served on many government/public and professional bodies, including the Bar Council, the Consumer Council, the Broadcasting Authority, the Press Council, the Administrative Appeals Board, the Municipal Services Appeals Board, the Law Reform Sub-Committee on Privacy, the Council of the Hong Kong Red Cross, and the Central Policy Unit of the Hong Kong Government. He has served on the Consumer Council for 12 years and was the chairman of its Consumer Legal Action Fund for 6 years until 2010, during which time he oversaw, among other things, a test case involving the collapse of Lehman Brothers. In 1995, he was elected as one of the Ten Young Outstanding Persons in Hong Kong. In 1997, he received the Badge of Honour from the British Red Cross Society for his distinguished service, notably in assisting the Hong Kong Red Cross in the transition from being a branch of the British Red Cross Society to becoming a branch of the Chinese Red Cross Society upon the change of sovereignty over Hong Kong. Since 2012, he has worked with the former Chief Secretary of Hong Kong Anson Chan on democratic development in Hong Kong and is a core member of Hong Kong 2020, established by Anson Chan.

In August 2018, Chan, who would reach retirement age in July 2019, received a two-year contract extension beyond retirement, rather than the conventional five years at the time of his application. It was reported that Hong Kong University did not give a substantial reason for the decision; a university spokesperson pointing to the "robust evaluation-approval process" applying to appointments beyond retirement age, which Chan had sought. In July 2021, Chan declined to apply for further extension beyond retirement, but agreed to continue to serve as an adjunct professor for 3 years at the university. He left the University of Hong Kong in July 2024 after completion of his 3-year adjunct professorship.

== Denied entry by Macau ==
On 27 February 2009, Chan was invited to give a public lecture on the right to a fair trial at the University of Macau. Under the newly enacted Macau national security law, he was not allowed to enter Macau. The ban was widely reported internationally and the Macau Government was criticised for interfering with freedom of expression and academic freedom. Chan believed the ban was related to his role in the Article 23 concern group in 2003 when he was among the loudest critics of the National Security Bill introduced by the HKSAR Government, since the visit fell on the week that the Macau Legislature adopted its National Security Law. . Chan had no difficulty visiting Mainland China or Taiwan. The only explanation given by Macau officials on the ban was that his name was on a stop list and that they were just doing their job. Legislator Nelson Wong said "it seems that Hong Kong lawmakers, journalists and academics are inferior to gamblers, sex tourists and loan sharks." Ronny Tong said it would be better for Hong Kong people not to travel to Macau (casinos) for entertainment. Pro-Beijing camp Regina Ip said the SAR government must react since it affects the human rights of citizens. Albert Ho called on the Hong Kong government to stop allowing Macau senior officials from entering Hong Kong if they continued to turn away pro-democracy politicians. Chief Executive of Macau Edmund Ho said that his officials had acted according to the law. He personally believed it has nothing to do with the legislation of Article 23. Casino tycoon Stanley Ho said "those who were barred deserved what they got".

== Pro-vice-chancellor selection controversy ==
Thought to be front-runner for the post of pro-vice-chancellor for staffing and resources of the University of Hong Kong, and having been unanimously recommended by a search committee of the University in November 2014, Chan was criticised in Wen Wei Po and Ta Kung Pao, two pro-China newspapers, for his liberal pro-democracy stance. Wen Wei Po, citing from a then embargoed University Grants Commission report, stated that the HKU Law Faculty had lost its leading research position to Chinese University of Hong Kong when Chan was the dean of the law school. The pro-China newspapers accused Chan of allowing the Faculty to be too involved in politics and for not taking steps to prevent his staff Associate Professor Benny Tai from carrying out the turbulent civic movement of Occupy Central. For the following nine months Chan was subject to extensive public attacks by the pro-establishment media. When the University Grants Commission Report was published, it showed that HKU Law Faculty lost only by a small margin in the research assessment exercise 2014 and HKU has a much larger number of returnable staff than CUHK. According to an article written by Kevin Lau in Ming Pao, parties close to the government applied pressure on committee members behind the scenes to block Chan's appointment. Chief Executive Leung Chun-ying has been reported to have telephoned members of the committee to persuade them to vote against Chan's appointment, whilst Sophia Kao, member of the Central Policy Unit, admitted that she may have mentioned Chan's candidature to someone "casually" but said she did not recall with whom and in what context. CY Leung's lieutenant Fanny Law, who was found to have interfered with institutional autonomy in 2007 whilst she was Education Secretary, categorically denied having intervened. Leung also denied allegations he intervened in the selection.

The council was criticised when it repeatedly deferred the decision to appoint Chan, stating that it should wait until a new provost was in place. The decision was repeatedly delayed through votes on 30 June and 28 July. On 29 September 2015, the council rejected Chan's appointment (by 12 votes to 8) through a secret ballot in a closed meeting; no reason for the decision was provided. Subsequent leakage of the discussions at the council meeting suggested that the reasons for rejection had nothing to do with the merits of his appointment. HKU successfully obtained an injunction restraining publications of such leaked information. During the period, Chan received a lot of support from academic colleagues, students and the community. A number of leading academics from Cambridge University, Melbourne University and New York University made statements testifying to his scholarship, leadership and integrity.

== Comments on mourning police stabbing perpetrator and National Security Offences ==
Broadcaster RTHK reported that on 4 July 2021, Chan had said any suggestions that laying flowers to mourn the death of the attacker Leung Kin-fai of the July 1 police stabbing might be illegal were far-fetched. He said people might be mourning the death of Leung out of sympathy or expressing discontent with the government, which was very different from terrorism. Former Commissioner of Police Chris Tang condemned Chan sharply, saying: "I hope that this law professor can sleep at night", and warned of possible "bloodshed" in the city as a result of Chan's comments.

In 2024, he criticised an amendment to the Prison Regulation that effectively removed remission of sentence for those convicted of national security offences for its vagueness in the scope of application and its unfairness in having retrospective effect. He was publicly condemned by the Secretary for Security for his view, which was said to be inaccurate and misleading. In 2025 he criticised the conviction of a former legislator for riot in the controversial 721 incident where protesters and commuters were trapped inside a train station by a large group of attackers who eventually entered the station and indiscriminately attacked passengers in the station, and where the evidence in the judgment revealed that police knew about the attack well in advance and failed to take any timely action or response. He was immediately condemned by the Secretary for Security for being inaccurate and misleading and for inciting hatred against the government and the judiciary. Ming Pao, the Chinese newspaper that published his comments, was also warned by the Secretary for Security for its liability under the National Security Law.

== Major Books Edited and Authored ==
- 2018: "Paths of Justice" (HKU Press)
- 2015: "Law of the Hong Kong Constitution" (Sweet & Maxwell) (2nd edition; edition 2011) (with CL Lim)
- 2015: "General Principles of Hong Kong Law" (Joint Publisher, in Chinese, 3rd edition; 2nd ed 2009; 1st ed, 1999) (with Albert Chen & others)
- 2015: "Constitutional Law and Human Rights"(Sweet & Maxwell, Halsbury's Laws of Hong Kong Special Issue (with the Hon Justice K Bokhary and others)
- 2004: "Immigration Law in Hong Kong" (Sweet & Maxwell) (with Bart Rwezaura)
- 2000: "Hong Kong's Constitutional Debate: Conflict over Interpretation" (HKU Press) (with Fu Hualing and Yash Ghai)
- 2000: "On the Road to Justice" (in Chinese):
- 1995: "Media Law and Practice" (Commercial Press, in Chinese) (with Kenneth Leung)
- 1993: "The Hong Kong Bill of Rights: A Comparative Approach" (Butterworths)(with Yash Ghai)
- 1993: "Public Law and Human Rights: A Hong Kong Sourcebook" (Butterworths)(with Andrew Byrnes)
- 1990: "Human Rights in Hong Kong" (in Chinese)

== Awards ==
- 13th Hong Kong Book Prize 2020
- Prestigious Fellowship in Humanities and Social Sciences 2019
- Human Rights Press Award 1999
- Ten Young Outstanding Persons in Hong Kong 1995

== See also ==
- Politics of Hong Kong
- Politics of Macau
