= Office of the Unofficial Members of the Executive and Legislative Councils =

- 行政立法兩局非官守議員辦事處
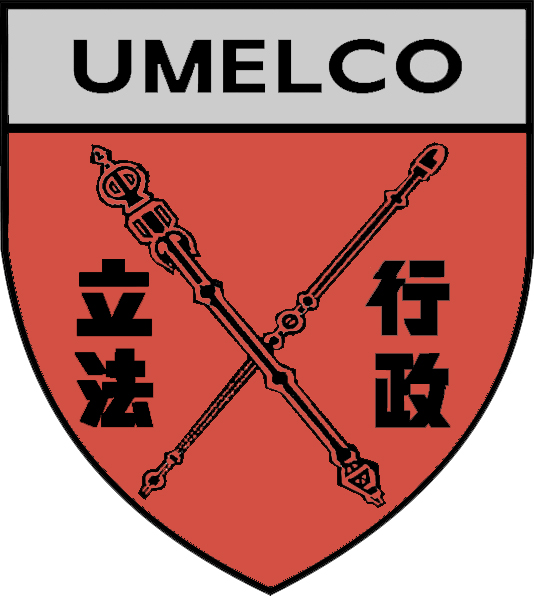

Agency overview
- Formed: 1963
- Dissolved: 1989
- Superseding agency: Commissioner for Administrative Complaints
- Parent department: Executive Council; Legislative Council

Office of the Unofficial Members of the Executive and Legislative Councils
- Traditional Chinese: 行政立法兩局非官守議員辦事處
Transcriptions
Yue: Cantonese
- Yale Romanization: Hàhng jing lahp faat léuhng guhk fēi gūn sáu yíh yùhn baahn sih chyu
- Jyutping: Hang4 zing3 lap6 faat3 loeng5 guk6 fei1 gun1 sau2 ji5 jyun4 baan6 si6 cyu3

The Office of the Unofficial Members of the Executive and Legislative Councils was an office for the Unofficial Members of the Executive and Legislative Councils (UMELCO) of Hong Kong established in 1963. Its purpose was to promote close relationship of the two Councils and invite them to put forward their views on public interest or lodge individual complaints again the departments of Hong Kong Government.

The office was established in August 1963 at Union House in Central. It was at first staffed with a stenographer/receptionist. On 16 September 1964 a full Secretary was appointed together with a clerk, a typist, and a messenger. On 8 May 1965, the office moved to Prince's Building.

In 1985 UMELCO was renamed as Office of Members of the Executive and Legislative Councils or OMELCO following the 1985 Hong Kong electoral reform and indirect elections for the Legislative Council of Hong Kong. The office finally dissolved with the establishment of Commissioner for Administrative Complaints or COMAC in 1989 of now better known as Office of The Ombudsman of Hong Kong since 2001.
