= Leung Chun-ying–UGL agreement =

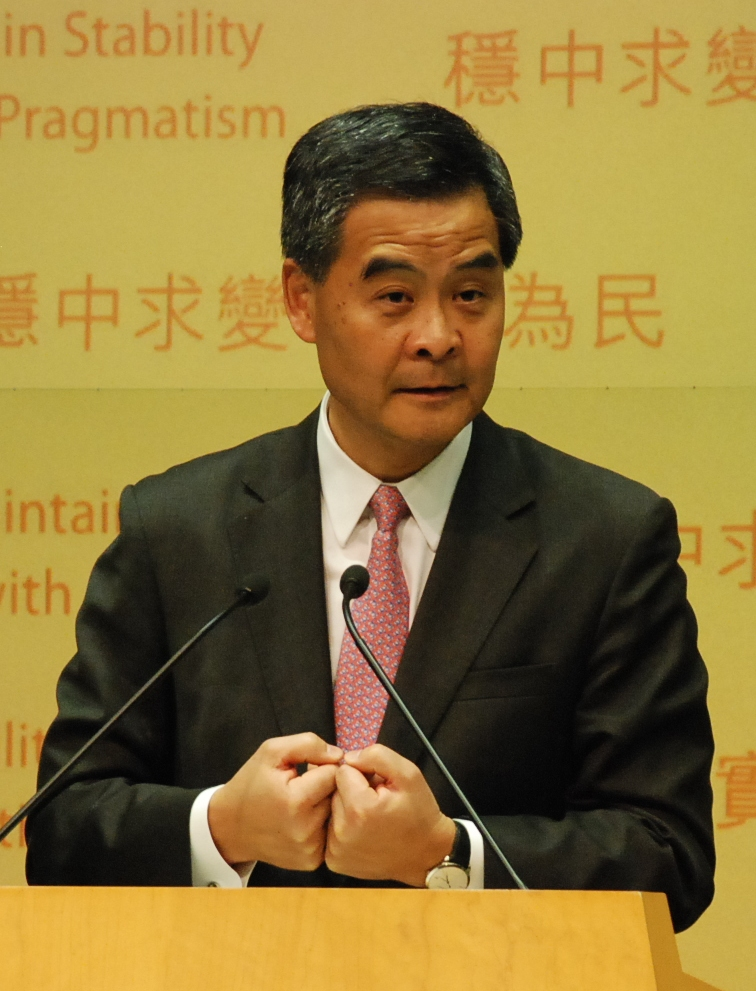
Leung Chun-ying at the Policy Address in 2013.

In October 2014, it was reported that Leung Chun-ying, then-Chief Executive of Hong Kong, had signed an agreement in 2011 with UGL, an Australian engineering firm, in relation to its takeover of DTZ, a UK-listed real estate services company in which Leung was the director of the company. In agreement, UGL undertook to pay Leung £4 million (HK$50 million) in two instalments in 2012 and 2013 respectively, subject to specific conditions. As these payments concurred with the term of office of Leung Chun-ying as Chief Executive between 2012 and 2017, it has aroused concerns of the public in respect of the nature of payment, potential conflict of interests, relevant systems of declaration of interests and taxation implications.

The UGL case was under investigation of the Independent Commission Against Corruption (ICAC) for an unusual four-year long period from 2014 to 2018. In July 2016, Rebecca Li Bo-lan, the acting head of the Operations Department of ICAC resigned after the cessation of the acting appointment in which such unusual change raised public concern. It was speculated it might be related to the UGL case as Li was reportedly its principal investigator. In November 2016, a select committee to inquire into the UGL incident was set up in the Legislative Council of Hong Kong (LegCo). In May 2017, it was revealed that Holden Chow, vice-chairman of the select committee, had privately discussed with the Chief Executive about the UGL case in which Leung "made suggestions about the scope" of the investigation. It raised public concern over Leung's interference into the investigation.

== Background ==
DTZ was a real estate services company listed in the United Kingdom with a history of more than 200 years before its closure. It had ventured into Asia since 1999, partnering with Asian firms including CY Leung & Co, a surveying company set up by Leung Chun-ying in Hong Kong. Leung was appointed as a board member of DTZ in December 2006 and chairman of DTZ Asia Pacific in February 2007.

DTZ was severely affected by the Great Recession which resulted in a cumulative loss of £106.7 million (HK$1.3 billion) before tax during 2009–2011. As the major shareholder, Saint George Participations (SGP) refused to inject more liquidity into the company. As DTZ found it difficult to service the total secured debt of £110 million (HK$1.4 billion) owed to the Royal Bank of Scotland (RBS), its lead creditor, the latter engaged Ernst and Young (EY) to provide strategic advice on the options available to RBS in regard to DTZ's debt on 17 October 2011. As a result, DTZ commenced a fast-track sale two days later to minimise its debt loss. ON 8 November 2011, UGL, an Australian engineering firm was chosen as the "preferred bidder" in the rescue takeover of DTZ as voted by the DTZ directors.

Shortly after that, Leung stepped down from the board of DTZ on 24 November before he declared his candidacy for the 2012 Hong Kong Chief Executive election on 27 November 2011. Prior to that, Leung resigned from the Executive Council of Hong Kong (ExCo) on 3 October 2011.

== Agreement ==
On 2 November 2011, UGL issued an agreement letter to Leung, setting out the following terms of agreement in relation to UGL's takeover of DTZ:

1. Cash bonus earlier committed by DTZ: UGL undertook to pay Leung Chun-ying the outstanding bonus of £1.5 million (HK$18.7 million) which DTZ agreed to pay for the period from 1 May 2010 through to the completion of the sale of DTZ;
2. Formal terms of payment of £4 million: UGL would pay Leung Chun-ying a total of £4 million (HK$50 million) over a two-year period in 2012 and 2013, provided that Leung
  1. provides assistance in promoting UGL and DTZ as reasonably required by UGL, including but not limited to acting as a referee and adviser from time to time;
  2. supports the acquisition of DTZ by UGL;
  3. retains the senior management team of DTZ until end-2013;
  4. does not make any statements criticising the takeover; and
  5. undertakes non-compete, non-poach arrangements in the following 24 months after the acquisition of DTZ by UGL; and
3. Sale options of DTZ Japan Ltd: For the stake of DTZ Japan Ltd still held by Leung Chun-ying, UGL offered an immediate sale option to buy his shares at £200,000 (HK$2.5 million) plus 30% of the net profit of DTZ Japan Ltd after taxation for the three financial years during 2012-2013 if Leung chose to sell at a later date, UGL offered a put option to buy his stake within seven years from the completion of UGL's acquisition of DTZ, at a price equivalent to 30% times seven of the earnings before interest, taxes, depreciation and amortisation (EBITDA) of DTZ Japan Ltd, where EBITDA is the average of three financial years before he activates the put option, subject to a minimum payment of £200,000 (HK$2.5 million).

On the same day, Leung Chun-ying signed the agreement, but inserted a handwritten note "provided that such assistance does not create a conflict of interest" next to the clause (2)(1). At the same time, DTZ received a rival bid from another company, China's state-owned Tianjin Innovation Financial Investment Company which had made a bid that valued DTZ at £100 million more than the bid by UGL, but that this more valuable bid was rejected by the DTZ board, which included Leung, and not released to shareholders. It was reported that EY and RBS thought the execution time was too long to address the imminent liquidity crisis, the directors decided to choose UGL as "it provided the most likely opportunity of delivering the best outcome for creditors". On 4 December 2011, UGL completed its acquisition of DTZ through the pre-pack sale mechanism, at a cost of £77.5 million (HK$967.2 million).

On 25 March 2012, Leung Chun-ying was elected as the Chief Executive of Hong Kong. He was sworn in on 1 July for a five-year period up to 30 June 2017. According to the terms of the agreement between Leung and UGL, Leung should have received £2 million (HK$25 million) each in 2012 and 2013 respectively from UGL, but there has not been any publicly available information on the details of these payments to date.

== Disclosure and reporting ==
On 8 October 2014, Fairfax Media, an Australian media agency, published for the first time a detailed report on the above agreement between Leung Chun-ying and UGL in the Sydney Morning Herald and The Age. This had aroused intense public discussion in Hong Kong during the city-wide pro-democracy protests often dubbed as the "Umbrella Revolution". The members of the public raised question over the UGL agreement on the nature of payment, potential conflict of interests, relevant systems of declaration of interests; and taxation implications.

The clause of Leung agreeing to "[act] as a referee and adviser from time to time" raised to concerns on whether Leung agreed to provide future services to UGL, as for the Chief Executive, it was illegal to accept any paid advisory for a commercial entity. Even though Leung had a handwritten clause in the contract stating that he would perform the required duty "provided that it does not create any conflict of interest", legislator Albert Ho of the Democratic Party said it was not enough for Leung as the Chief Executive was already paid for such duty. Ho questioned whether Leung had declared such interest to the Chief Justice of the Court of Final Appeal as required by Article 47(2) of the Basic Law.

Leung Chun-ying issued a statement on the same day, highlighting that the £4 million (HK$50 million) payments arose from his "resignation from DTZ, not any future service to be provided by him". Moreover, as he had already resigned from the ExCo well before his conclusion of agreement with UGL on the one hand, and the agreement took place before his election as the Chief Executive on the other, "there is no requirement under our current systems of declaration" to declare the payments. While the Neo Democrats, a pro-democracy party, lodged a complaint about the issue with the Independent Commission Against Corruption (ICAC) on 9 October 2014, the Secretary for Justice had delegated responsibility to Director of Public Prosecutions to handle the case.

The Chief Executive's Office responded to the inquiries about Leung's tax implications by claiming that he "was not required to pay salaries tax for the related payments" on the advice of his accountant. John Garnaut, an Australian journalist who was one of the writers of the original report said that his team received the original documents on 5 October from an anonymous source. He also said that they had been "threatened" with legal action by Leung's lawyers before they published the report. In response to such accusation, the Chief Executive's Office said Leung decided to pursue a potential case as the allegations of a "bribe" provided by the report were "very serious".

Both EY and the chairman of the then DTZ Tim Melville-Ross were reportedly not aware of the agreement between Leung and UGL in 2011. In reply to a press enquiry, EY commented that "it was natural" for UGL to enter into a non-poaching arrangement to secure key personnel, and added that "any such arrangements made were between UGL and the employees". Likewise, RBS was reportedly unaware of the agreement. That said, there was a conflicting press report claiming the otherwise afterwards. UGL issued a press release on 9 October 2014 to counter the allegation of "secret payment" to Leung. It said that the agreements were "common confidential commercial arrangements when a business is being acquired" and they were "standard businesses practice for non-compete and non-poach agreements".

David Webb, who was the deputy chairman of the Takeovers and Mergers Panel of the Securities and Futures Commission and editor of Webb-Site.com, commented on the matter, saying that EY should have been informed about the agreement between Leung and UGL so it could "consider whether an excessive amount of the value of the business was being shifted from the company to its director and management". As Leung failed to disclose the side-deal, Webb said Leung might have "obtained an advantage without his principal’s consent, against Section 9 of the Prevention of Bribery Ordinance (Cap. 201)."

== Legislative Council inquires ==
On 17 October 2014 at the House Committee meeting of the Legislative Council (LegCo), three members put forward a proposal for the House Committee Chairman to move a motion under the Legislative Council (Powers and Privileges) Ordinance (Cap. 382) in Council to seek the council's authorisation for the appointment of a select committee to inquire into the alleged receipt of secret payments of Leung from UGL and related issues. After deliberations, the proposal was voted down by the pro-Beijing camp as 22 members voted for and 38 members voted against the proposal. Similar proposals were tabled on several occasions on 31 October, 5 November and 20 November but all motions were defeated by the pro-Beijing camp.

At the House Committee meeting on 17 October 2014, pro-democrats considered that the UGL payments Leung Chun-ying were "illicit kickbacks", in return for his support of UGL's acquisition of DTZ. UGL's payment to Leung was alleged to have negative implications on the purchase price of DTZ, which were "grossly unfair to the small shareholders of DTZ". As Leung had agreed to provide such assistance, this also prompted a concern whether he had engaged in a "part-time job" during his office as the Chief Executive. However, pro-Beijing camp considered that the agreement between Leung and UGL was just a "common commercial arrangement" for protecting the acquirer's interests in mergers and acquisitions. Some members were of the view that the UGL payment was a "golden handshake" package for "non-compete, non-poach" requirements, although a member pointed out that payments under non-compete, non-poach arrangements were usually stated in the main merger and acquisition contract for endorsement by the board of directors of both buyer and seller sides, rather than in a private agreement.

At the council meeting of 29 October 2014, a member commented that the UGL payments were made after Leung had taken office of the Chief Executive, leading to conflict of interests of the Chief Executive. However, some members noted that UGL had not requested Leung to undertake any task whatsoever on its behalf after the agreement, nor had Leung offered to perform any such task. However, other members argued that refraining from taking any actions could also constitute a form of assistance to UGL. By making reference to the Prevention of Bribery Ordinance (Cap. 201), forbearing to do an act after accepting advantages is itself a kind of service.

In response to the members questioning the requirements of declaration of interests of the Chief Executive pursuant to Article 47(2) of the Basic Law, "[t]he Chief Executive, on assuming office, shall declare his or her assets to the Chief Justice of the Court of Final Appeal, Chief Secretary for Administration Carrie Lam elaborated that the term "assets" was not specifically defined under the Basic Law and the contents of relevant declaration were confidential. More specifically on the UGL payments, Lam pointed out that "the agreed payment arose from Leung's resignation from DTZ, not any future service to be provided by him". Thus Leung was not required to declare the resignation agreement. In terms of timing, both his resignation from DTZ and conclusion of the agreement with UGL took place before he was elected as the Chief Executive, and at the material time, he had already resigned from ExCo. Coupled with the fact that he had not provided any service to UGL after signing the resignation agreement, Leung was not required to make declaration of the UGL payments.

According to the government, Leung had made the tax payment for the cash bonus of £1.5 million (HK$18.7 million), but not the formal terms of payment of £4 million (HK$50 million). At the council meeting of 20 November 2014, a member raised a question that the UGL payments involved services to be provided in Hong Kong and thus should have taxation implications, as according to section 8 of the Inland Revenue Ordinance (Cap. 112) (IRO), salaries tax is chargeable if the income of an individual from any office or employment or any pension arising in or derived from Hong Kong, while the profits arising from the sale of capital assets are excluded from profits tax.

At the council meeting of 2 November 2016, the petition presented by Kenneth Leung of the Professional Commons co-signed with Andrew Wan of the Democratic Party to establish a select committee to inquire into the UGL incident. However, it was not authorised by the council to exercise the powers under section 9(1) of the Legislative Council (Powers and Privileges) Ordinance (Cap. 382).

In November 2017, Paul Tse Wai-chun, the head of the Legco select committee said that Leung Chun-ying is dodging the investigation as he refused to attend meetings, provide necessary documents and when he does provide documents, it is unsatisfactory.

== Rebecca Li resignation ==
On 7 July 2016, Rebecca Li Bo-lan, the acting head of the Operations Department of ICAC since 18 July 2015, resigned after the cessation of the acting appointment in which such unusual change raised public concern. It was speculated in some media reports that cessation of acting appointment might be related to the controversy surrounding the UGL Incident, as Li was reportedly the principal investigator over the UGL case in ICAC. Leung Chun-ying said he had no hand in Li's demotion. ICAC Commissioner Simon Peh, who was nominated by Leung Chun-ying, insisted he alone made the personal judgment that Rebecca was not up to the job.

In late July, Ricky Yau Shu-chun, who replaced Li as the acting head of the Operations Department, reportedly requested to terminate his contract with the ICAC in a few weeks after Li's resignation, and he would proceed on final leave on 1 August. Chief Forensic Accountant Tang Shuk-nei was also reported to be leaving the agency after her contract ends in mid August. Anson Chan, the former Chief Secretary for Administration and convener of think tank Hong Kong 2020, expressed concern over the unusual shakeup and urged Simon Peh to publicly explain in detail. In a surprise turn of events, Ricky Yau withdrew his request to terminate his contract only about three hours after his departure was made public.

Democratic Party legislator Albert Ho said there was little progress in the UGL case because neither the Chief Executive Office nor the Executive Council had responded to requests for information made by the ICAC close to a year ago. The UGL case has now been investigated by the ICAC for almost three years without any conclusion.

== Leung Chun-ying's legal letter to Apple Daily ==
In September 2016, Leung Chun-ying issued a legal letter to Apple Daily, a local pro-democracy newspaper, over an editorial it published on 8 September in relations to the UGL allegations. It wrote in the letter that the newspaper's "malicious" allegations of bribery and "vicious intention" harm his chances of re-election. The editorial in question called on newly elected legislators to invoke the Legislative Council (Powers and Privileges) Ordinance to pursue Leung over the controversial payment of HK$50 million he received from UGL. "The usage of the false corruption allegation to prevent Mr C.Y. Leung from exercising his constitutional right to stand for the re-election ... if he chooses to, demonstrates the very serious kind of malicious and injurious motive," the letter wrote. The letter also objected to the paper’s “disdainful” use of nicknames for Leung such as "689", "Wolf Ying" and "Liar Ying" in a campaign against his leadership, in which "689" refers to the number of votes Leung received from the 1,200-strong Election Committee in 2012.

It was the second time Leung had threatened legal action against a local media outlet. In 2013, Leung issued legal letters to the Hong Kong Economic Journal and columnist Joseph Lian Yi-zheng over an article linking him to triad gangsters. Apple Daily chief editor Chan Pui-man dismissed Leung’s complaint that the editorial could make him un-electable as "ridiculous and laughable". The Hong Kong Journalists Association expressed "shock and regret" over Leung’s legal action, saying he was causing public concern over freedom of speech.

== Report on DTZ Japan ==
In January 2017, a media report by Hong Kong Citizen News showed that the ownership of DTZ Japan Ltd had changed by end 2015, after UGL sold the entire business of DTZ to a consortium in November 2014. According to the report, DTZ UK Bidco Limited, a subsidiary of the consortium, held 100% stake of DTZ Japan Ltd as at 31 December 2015, although the exact date of stake transaction was not known. This suggested that Leung Chun-ying might have exercised the put option in the sale of his stake in DTZ Japan Ltd during the period 2012–2015, in accordance with the clause in the agreement between Leung and UGL. At this juncture, there are no official statements from Leung, the consortium and UGL to respond to the media report.

== Leung Chun-ying suing Kenneth Leung ==
In March 2017, Leung Chun-ying sued member of the Legislative Council Kenneth Leung for defamation over remarks about the UGL payment, claiming the latter had no basis to allege at a press briefing that overseas tax authorities were investigating the Chief Executive in relation to the HK$50 million payment from UGL. This was the first time a Hong Kong Chief Executive had sued a legislator for defamation. The writ also said it was defamatory for Kenneth Leung to claim the "central authorities would be very embarrassed if anything should happen to" Leung Chun-ying if he was elevated to vice-chairman of the Chinese People’s Political Consultative Conference (CPPCC) in which he assumed the office soon after.

Kenneth Leung said the lawsuit would not stop him from continuing with the Legislative Council investigation into the payment controversy in which he was a member of the select committee. According to the website of London-based law firm Clifford Chance, for which the legislator works, Kenneth Leung specialises in corporate and international tax planning and is named as one of the Global Top 250 tax advisers in the Tax Directors Handbook.

== Holden Chow controversy ==
On 15 May 2017, Holden Chow, member of the Legislative Council of the pro-Beijing Democratic Alliance for the Betterment and Progress of Hong Kong (DAB) and vice-chairman of the Legislative Council select committee to inquiry over the UGL incident was reportedly privately discussed with Leung Chun-ying about the UGL case in which Leung "made suggestions about the scope" of the investigation through a word document Chow presented in the committee. All 47 changes in the document were traced to the user name “CEO-CE” on 21 April.

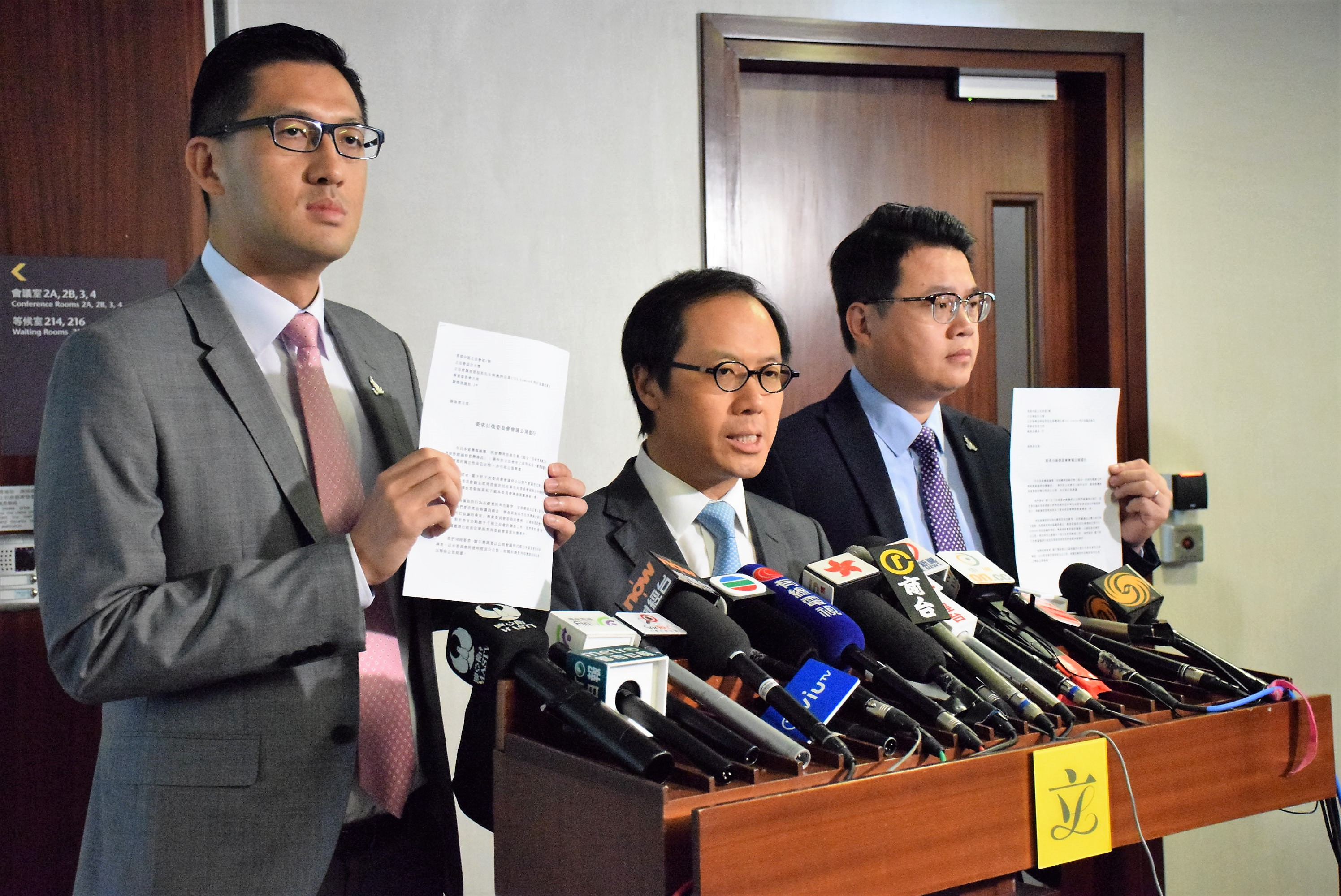
Lam Cheuk-ting, Kenneth Leung and Andrew Wan, three pro-democrat members of the select committee met the press over Holden Chow controversy.

The pro-democrats demanded that Chow resign from the select committee and from the Legislative Council as he had lost credibility. They warned that the legislature’s independence was under threat, as Democratic Party legislator Andrew Wan saying the case reflected "the executive branch’s unprecedented meddling with a LegCo probe". Other Democrat legislators Hui Chi-fung and Kwong Chun-yu went a step further to lodge a complaint with the ICAC, alleging misconduct in public office. Chow apologised for his "lack of political sensitivity" in not informing the select committee of Leung's "personal input", but he insisted there was nothing wrong in discussing the matter with Leung in private.

Leung Chun-ying insisted he had the right to express his opinions regarding the matter and called for an inquiry to find out who leaked the confidential document revealing his input in the matter during a closed-door meeting. He also accused Kenneth Leung, member of the select committee whom he was suing for allegedly defaming him over the UGL controversy, of being prejudiced against him. He demanded Kenneth Leung to withdraw from the investigation for holding conflicting interests.

After days of media reporting, Holden Chow resigned from the select committee on 19 May, "in hope of calming the political storm", while continuing denying there was any wrongdoing.

On 20 May, Leung fired at Kenneth Leung on his official blog, asking him 18 questions regarding the tax implications Kenneth Leung accused Leung Chun-ying for. He requested Kenneth Leung to explain which tax did he claim the tax authorities were investigating the Chief Executive on. Leung Chun-ying questioned if Kenneth Leung wanted to be the "screenwriter, director and actor in presenting the message that the chief executive is under investigation". He also that "is an example of how Hong Kong’s politics have deteriorated extremely ... We must, both through civil and criminal procedures, stop [people] using our law enforcement agencies as a tool for attacking government officials." It was the seventh time in a week Leung Chun-ying made a statement regarding to his UGL incident.

On the same day, the 28 pro-democrat legislators filed an impeachment motion against Leung for trying to intervene with the select committee investigation. After nine-hour debate, the motion to impeach Leung Chun-ying was defeated with 34 pro-Beijing legislators voted against it.

== Wolf-Hunting Action ==
In April 2018, the Democratic Party launched a crowdfunding campaign titled "Wolf-Hunting Action" (wolf is Leung Chun-ying's nickname) aimed to raise at least HK$2 million in 90 days to support an investigation in Hong Kong, the United Kingdom and Australia. The fund would be used for legal and accounting services, professional advisory services, liaison with overseas stakeholders, and gathering of evidence. The campaign was initiated by Lam Cheuk-ting, Andrew Wan, Kwong Chun-yu and Senia Ng after they received two sets of legal advice from Queen’s Counsel Paul Harris and another from a team of Hong Kong lawyers which showed that Leung may have committed two offences including section 9 of the Prevention of Bribery Ordinance. By the evening on that day, 285 Hongkongers had donated more than HK$106,000. In a legal statement issued on the same day, Leung slammed Lam’s remarks as "fundamentally and factually wrong", and stated he reserved the right to any future legal action.

On 8 September 2018, Leung Chun-ying declared that Britain’s National Crime Agency (NCA) had decided to halt its investigation of the UGL case. Lam Cheuk-ting later confirmed the news and disclosed the email from NCA’s Prosperity Director Donald Toon. Lam said he was disappointed with the NCA's decision and disappointed and would demand an explanation for its rationale.

== ICAC dropping the case ==
On 12 December 2018, the Independent Commission Against Corruption (ICAC) announced it would not take any "further investigative action" against Leung Chun-ying, ending the four-year marathon probe. The Department of Justice also issued a statement claiming there was "insufficient evidence to support a reasonable prospect of conviction" against Leung for any criminal offence.

Many critics, including former Director of Public Prosecutions Grenville Cross, said he found it "very surprising" that no independent legal advice was sought on Leung’s case and urged the Secretary for Justice to explain. "For many years, this has been the invariable practice whenever a senior government official has been suspected of a criminal offence," Cross said. The Democratic Party also considered asking for a judicial review of the Department of Justice’s decision.

Hundreds of protesters demonstrated against the government's decision on 23 December. Secretary for Justice Teresa Cheng, who was under fire and demanded a more detailed explanation kept silence for two weeks until Cheng returned from her leave on 26 December. She labelled the accusations of her being evasive as "spurious". She also argued the issues were being "politicised". She rejected the need to give further explanations on the Leung case, including of whether she was personally involved in the decision not to prosecute Leung, and also rejected the Bar Association's call to delegate prosecution decisions to the top prosecutor.
