= Eric Chan =

Hong Kong politician

The Honourable Eric Chan SBS IDSM JP
- 陳國基
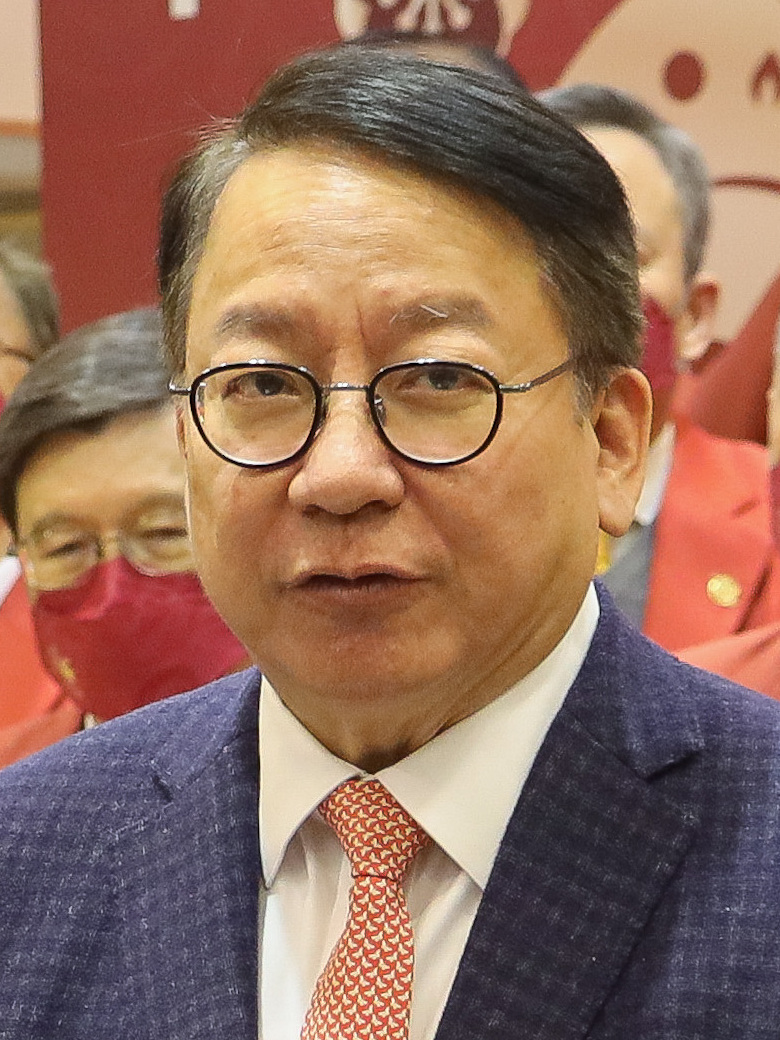
- Chan in 2023

9th Chief Secretary for Administration
- Incumbent
- Assumed office 1 July 2022
- Chief Executive: John Lee Ka-chiu
- Preceded by: John Lee Ka-chiu

Director of the Chief Executive's Office
- In office 1 July 2017 – 30 June 2022
- Chief Executive: Carrie Lam
- Preceded by: Edward Yau
- Succeeded by: Carol Yip Man-kuen

Secretary-General of the Committee for Safeguarding National Security
- In office 2 July 2020 – 30 June 2022
- Chairperson: Carrie Lam

Director of Immigration
- In office 28 March 2011 – 4 April 2016
- Chief Executive: Donald Tsang; Leung Chun-ying
- Preceded by: Simon Peh
- Succeeded by: Erick Tsang

Personal details
- Born: 5 April 1959 (age 67) British Hong Kong
- Spouse: Kristy Lai Chin Har
- Education: Shue Yan College (HonDip); Tsinghua University (LLB)
- Occupation: Civil servant

Eric Chan Kwok-ki
- Traditional Chinese: 陳國基
- Simplified Chinese: 陈国基
Transcriptions
Standard Mandarin
- Hanyu Pinyin: Chén Guójī
Yue: Cantonese
- Jyutping: Can4 Gwok3-gei1

Eric Chan Kwok-ki SBS IDSM JP (Chinese: 陳國基; born 5 April 1959) is a Hong Kong politician who is the incumbent Chief Secretary for Administration since 1 July 2022. He was also the secretary-general of the Committee for Safeguarding National Security (2020–2022). Previously, he served as Director of the Chief Executive's Office (2017–2022) and Director of Immigration (2011–2016). As he hosted the Hong Kong Safeguarding National Security Committee. He is subsequently in the OFAC specifically designated individuals or blocked persons(SDN) list pursuant to the Hong Kong Autonomy Act of 2020.

== Early life ==
Chan studied in CCC Heep Woh College from 1972 to 1976. In 1982, he graduated from Hong Kong Shue Yan College (Now Hong Kong Shue Yan University). During the year of his services, he completed a Bachelor of Laws degree at Tsinghua University in 2001.

== Career ==
Chan joined the Immigration Department of Hong Kong as an Assistant Immigration Officer in 1982. In 1989, he was promoted to Immigration Officer, then Senior Immigration Officer in 1995, and Chief Immigration Officer in 2000. By 2003, he was Assistant Principal Immigration Officer, and promoted to Principal Immigration Officer the following year. In 2007, Chan was appointed assistant director of Immigration, then deputy director of Immigration in 2010. He was appointed Director of Immigration in March 2011 succeeding Simon Peh.

Chan was involved in the import restriction imposed on Japanese goods to Hong Kong in aftermath of Fukushima Daiichi nuclear disaster.

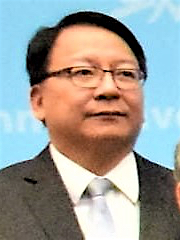
Chan in 2017

In May 2017, Chan was appointed Director of Chief Executive-elect's Office under Chief Executive-elect Carrie Lam. He was appointed Director of Chief Executive's Office when Lam took office in July 2017.

In July 2020, Chan was appointed Secretary General of the Committee for Safeguarding National Security of the Hong Kong Special Administrative Region.

=== U.S. sanctions ===
In August 2020, Chan and ten other officials were sanctioned by the United States Department of the Treasury under Executive Order 13936 by President Trump for undermining Hong Kong's autonomy. His home at Royal Ascot in Sha Tin was bought for HKD 8.69 million in 2009 and the mortgage was fully paid off, negating any issues that could arise from sanctions against his bank.

On 14 October 2020, the United States Department of State released a report on ten individuals who materially contributed to the failure of China to fulfill its obligations under the Sino–British Joint Declaration and Hong Kong's Basic Law. Chan was included on the list.

=== Chief Secretary for Administration ===
In September 2023, Chan said about a recent rainstorm that "For this heavy rain, it was once in 500 years. It was so big and so sudden and the predictability was so low."However, records have only been kept since 1884, or 139 years at the time of the storm.

In November 2023, after some experts predicted record low voter turnout for the District Council elections, Chan said that Hong Kong's 170,000 civil servants "are duty-bound to vote, and they should lead by example to let the public know about the importance of voting." However, Chan said there were no performance goals for voter turnout. Chan later changed his tone and said it would be a pity if turnout was low.

Before the vote, Chan said that "If turnout is low, can the elected councillor really represent the district?" and later, the elections received the lowest voter turnout after 1997.

==== Strive and Rise Program ====
In August 2022, Chan announced the "Strive and Rise Program" to give 2,000 students a HK$10,000 subsidy and mentorship; the program was quickly criticized as "poorly conceived".

==== Taiwan ====
In August 2022, Chan criticized Nancy Pelosi's visit to Taiwan, claiming it "seriously undermined China's sovereignty and territorial integrity and constituted a gross interference in the country's internal affairs". Chan and other government officials were criticized by Lew Mon-hung for "crossing the line" with his statements on Taiwan, as the Basic Law stipulates that diplomatic affairs of Hong Kong are to be handled by mainland China's Foreign Ministry.

==== COVID-19 ====
On 10 October 2022, Chan defended the "0+3" measure for inbound travelers to Hong Kong despite calls to remove all restrictions, and said it was "the most appropriate arrangement" and was "an important step made after thorough thinking, involving detailed discussion inside the government, consultation with experts and analysis of various statistics."

On 5 October 2022, legislative council member Doreen Kong criticized the government and Lo Chung-mau for invalidating 20,000 COVID-19 vaccine exemption passes, stating that he had no legal authority to do so. Kong had sharply criticized the annulment in a Facebook post the day before, writing "Who is destroying the rule of law now?" Chan defended the government and said it was "sensible and reasonable" in its decision, and that the use of the passes would risk people's health and cause "unnecessary pressure" on hospitals. On 11 October 2022, the High Court temporary stopped Lo's invalidation of the vaccine exemption passes.

==== Global Financial Leaders' Investment Summit ====
On 29 October 2022, after members of the US Congress asked US-based financial executives to reconsider going to the Global Financial Leaders' Investment Summit, Chan said "This shows the US and other Western countries are using all extreme means to suppress China, including Hong Kong."

==== Talents Service Unit ====
In December 2022, Chan said "We are confident that we can attract at least 35,000 talented professionals every year for the next three years."

==== Jimmy Lai ====
In December 2022, the NPCSC ruled that the Chief Executive could block foreign lawyers from representing defendants in national security cases, after Jimmy Lai attempted to hire UK lawyer Tim Owen. In January 2023, Ming Pao newspaper published a comic that said the NPCSC "only confirmed that the chief executive and the committee could do whatever they want."

In reaction, Chan said the government "deeply regretted" the comic, which made "biased, misleading, and false accusations" to the "constitutional responsibility of the chief executive to safeguard national security." Chan also said "It is completely wrong and misleading for the comic to depict the NPCSC interpretation as allowing the chief executive to do 'whatever he wants'," and also said "The interpretation abided by the principle of the rule of law, and did not harm the court's independent judiciary power or basic human rights such as the right to a fair trial."

== Awards ==
In 2001, Chan was awarded the Hong Kong Immigration Service Long Service Medal. In 2009, he received the Hong Kong Immigration Service Medal for Distinguished Service (IDSM).

== Personal life ==
Chan's wife tested positive for COVID-19, and Chan was sent to compulsory quarantine on 21 June 2022; Chan later tested positive for it.

Chan and his family own 3 properties.

Chan is a voting member of the Hong Kong Jockey Club.

== Notes ==
Government offices
New title	Secretary-General of the Committee for Safeguarding National Security; 2020–2022	Vacant
Preceded by Edward Yau	Director of the Chief Executive's Office; 2017–2022	Succeeded by Carol Yip
Preceded by Simon Peh	Director of Immigration; 2011–2016	Succeeded by Erick Tsang
Order of precedence
Preceded by Carrie Lam; Former Chief Executive	Hong Kong order of precedence Chief Secretary for Administration	Succeeded by Paul Chan Mo-po; Financial Secretary
