= Office of the Ombudsman (Hong Kong) =

Statutory complaints body in Hong Kong

Office of The Ombudsman
- 申訴專員公署

Agency overview
- Formed: 1 March 1989; 37 years ago
- Headquarters: 30/F, China Merchants Tower, Shun Tak Centre, 168-200 Connaught Road Central, Hong Kong
- Employees: 90 (March 2007)
- Annual budget: HK$85.1m (2008-09)
- Agency executives: Jack CHAN Jick-chi, Ombudsman; Mr So Kam Shing, Deputy Ombudsman
- Website: www.ombudsman.gov.hk

Office of the Ombudsman
- Traditional Chinese: 申訴專員公署
- Simplified Chinese: 申诉专员公署
Transcriptions
Standard Mandarin
- Hanyu Pinyin: Shēnsù Zhuānyuán Gōngshǔ
Yue: Cantonese
- Yale Romanization: Sān sou jyūn yùhn gūng chyúh
- Jyutping: San1 sou3 zyun1 jun4 gung2 cyu4

The Office of Ombudsman is a Hong Kong statutory authority, established on 1 March 1989, charged with ensuring that Hong Kong is served by a fair and efficient public administration that is committed to accountability, openness and quality of services. It operates mainly by investigating and giving recommendations to government departments.

== Functions ==
The major purpose of the Ombudsman is to investigate complaints against major public organisations and government departments and agencies in Hong Kong. It also oversees complaints against the executive branch in relation to non-compliance with the Code on Access to Information. Notably, the Ombudsman is empowered to initiate direct investigations into issues of potentially wide public interest and concern without the requirement of having a complainant. For instance, it conducts four to eight active investigations each year, such as regarding the policy over special education services for students with emotional needs, following an enquiry by a Legislative Councillor. Another example would be looking into government policy on granting recreational lease and then making recommendations.

The Ombudsman adopts a variety of methods to handle complaints. The basic form is inquiry, referring to the practice that requires the organisation to offer a response for examination and give suggestions thereafter. When serious or further problems are observed, a full investigation follows. It applies when the complaint involves issues of principle, systemic flaws or serious maladministration. A full investigation will be conducted with prior notice to the head of the department concerned. In cases of minor maladministration, with the consent of the complainant and the organisation concerned, investigators trained in mediation will serve as impartial mediators to settle the conflict.

It is worth noting that the Ombudsman is statutorily prevented from investigating: prosecutorial policy, legal proceedings, imposition (or variation) of condition of land grant, personnel matters and commercial transactions. Also, it will not take a complaint made more than two years after the complainant first knew of the situation. The Ombudsman will not take complaints if the complainant is not the person aggrieved or if the complaint has no connection with Hong Kong. It also retains discretion to reject complaints that are trivial, frivolous or not made in good faith.

== History ==
At its establishment in 1989, the office was known as “The Commissioner for Administrative Complaints”, under the Commissioner for Administrative Complaints Ordinance. The Ombudsman was not then a corporate unit and could handle only complaints that were referred from a Legislative Councillor.

Before its establishment, complaints channels in Hong Kong were uncoordinated, being made through, for example, Legislative Councillors, members of District Boards or the Urban Council. However, such persons did not have the power to demand information or explanation. A petition to the British government or a judicial review was available but these channels failed to limit the discretion of the Governor. The more institutional way was to complain through the Complaints Office under the Executive Council. In corruption-related matters, someone could express their grievance to the Independent Commission Against Corruption (ICAC), however, there was no distinct and independent office to handle matters of maladministration.

The call for an ombudsman was first made in a speech in the Legislative Council in February 1965, and such a proposal was supported by the councillors who also urged the establishment of an ombudsman in the wake of the 1967 riots. In 1986, the Government published “Redress of Grievances”, which revealed the majority view then that an independent and authorised organisation to handle complaints should be created. Scholars state that the establishment of an ombudsman was argued to be motivated by the Hong Kong Public Administration Reform that emphasised “higher efficiency and better services”, and growing political awareness and democratisation initiated from the mid-80s.

When it was established, the Office consisted of 27 members, led by a Directorate consisting of five members. There were separate divisions for development, assessment and investigation. The new set-up also included independent panels of professional advisors. Since most officials in the body would return to the administrative department upon completion of secondment, there was concern regarding a lack of commitment on their part as well as problems of continuity and limited vision in terms of the long-term development of the Ombudsman office.

== Development ==
=== Situation in 1988 ===
There were several limitations in the 1988 Commissioner for Administrative Complaints Bill. Firstly, the Ordinance required complaints to be first made to Legislative Councillors instead of the Commissioners, adding an obstructive layer of bureaucracy. Besides, the powers of the Commissioners were limited in application to only 52 governmental departments. They were not allowed to investigate acts of the police or ICAC, affairs related to security, international relations, legal actions or contracts, or even public enterprises and the administration of civil servants. This created a failure to meet the legislative aim, which was to investigate minor mistakes by civil servants. As well as such a failure of reach, the Commissioner also faced significant constraints in the conduct of investigations. The targeted administrative departments could hinder an investigation into maladministration involving the public interest but without specific victims by refusing to disclose documents, claiming insufficient legitimate and persuasive explanation by the Commissioner.

In the decade following, the Ombudsman underwent several reforms to address these various deficiencies until 2001, through the amendment of legislation. The period post-2001 saw gradual development in both investigative operations and publicity.

=== 1994 reform ===
In response to changes proposed by Governor Chris Patten in 1992 and the limitations of the 1988 Ordinance, a Committee was set up to draft the “Commissioner for Administrative Complaints (Amendment) Ordinance. The amended ordinance, gazetted in 1994, incorporated several improvements in the institution of the Ombudsman.

First, its reach was enhanced to include the potential to investigate a further six statutory bodies, including the Urban Council, Regional Council and Housing Authority. Second, the Ombudsman was given the power to publish anonymous investigation reports on issues of public interest, at any time of the year. Previously, investigation reports were permitted only within the annual report. The changes brought the authority and power enjoyed by the Ombudsman to more or less that of the present day. Yet it is still criticised in terms of its confidentiality element in that it limits the capacity of the Commissioner to disclose the necessary information and to exercise discretionary power. Third, the Chinese title of the Ombudsman was changed from “Administrative Affairs Ombudsman” to “Ombudsman”.

The most remarkable change in 1994 was the creation of a direct complaints channel and the abolition of the referral system. Citizens could now file complaints directly to the Ombudsman, who therefore handled complaints from receipt to conclusion, a more independent and autonomous process. However, the expansion of power also magnified the undersupply of resources of the Ombudsman in the pre-transition period. The number of complaints rose dramatically, increasing 17-fold compared with 1989 but met with personnel levels that had only tripled. Just 90 staff had to deal with 62 departments of approximately 180,000 public servants. The Ombudsman responded to the increased load by eliminating the mandatory requirement to prepare a report to the Head of the department. Alternatively, with the consent of the complainant, an investigation could be remitted to the relevant department, removing the mandatory requirement for investigation.

=== 1996 improvement ===
In 1996, the Commissioner for Administrative Complaints was given a new English title of “the Ombudsman” and the “Office of the Ombudsman” (Ombudsman, HK, 2016).

In order to enhance the system to handle complaints of maladministration, an Ombudsman (Amendment) ordinance was proposed to further expand the power and enhance the operation of the Ombudsman. The Ordinance came into effect on 27 December 1996.

The jurisdiction of the Ombudsman was further expanded to cover the Hong Kong Police Force, Hong Kong Auxiliary Police Force, ICAC, Independent Police Complaints Council and Public Service Commission (Ombudsman Ordinance (Cap. 397)). The Ombudsman was empowered to investigate these organisations regarding the Code on Access to Information, However, there remained certain limitations on its actions relating to the ICAC and the police force. As stated in the Ombudsman Ordinance (Cap. 397) Schedule 2:

Any action taken by the Independent Commission Against Corruption, the Hong Kong Auxiliary Police Force or the Hong Kong Police Force in relation to the prevention, detection or investigation of any crime or offence, whether or not the action is taken solely by any one of these organisations, or jointly by more than one of these organisations or by any one or more of them together with any other organisations or persons.

Furthermore, the Ombudsman was no longer required by its rules to deliver investigation reports in verified complaint cases (Ombudsman Ordinance (Cap 397 s 16(1)). Discretionary power was granted to the Ombudsman regarding its investigations.

In terms of responsibility, the Obligation of Confidentiality expressly requires the Ombudsman and its officers to not disclose any content of their investigations or other information relating to a complaint. An expanded interpretation of confidentiality regulations was set out in 1996, stating that only when sufficient to lead to enforcement of the investigation under the Ordinance could the Ombudsman and its officers disclose its information.

Despite improvements such as the relaxation of the obligation of confidentiality, the Ombudsman still possessed no right to publish or publicise its investigation reports to the public. The lack of independence and flexibility remained a problem in the operation of the Ombudsman.

=== 2001 reform ===
In the face of constraints encountered the implementation of the 1996 Ordinance, the Head of the Ombudsman raised the suggestion of bringing the Ombudsman out of government and the civil service hierarchy so as to build an independent system to handle complaints of maladministration, with separate financial management. In support of the independence, the government was concurrently encouraged to think from the perspective of ‘managing maladministration’ and was urged to delegate necessary powers in order to ensure the effective working and management after the Ombudsman's departure from the government structure.

In response to this request from the Ombudsman, a committee was set up to draft the ‘Ombudsman (Amendment) Ordinance 2001’, which remains the effective ordinance in Hong Kong.

The most remarkable change in the 2001 reform was the growth of independence of the Ombudsman. It was stipulated in the ordinance that the Ombudsman is a single legal and permanent entity that can sue or be sued. The law also empowers the Ombudsman to determine the terms and conditions he or she delegates. The aim was that the Ombudsman would not be seen as an agency or employee of the government of to have a position in the government, with its controlling officer of bribery prevention as the only exception. Hence, the Ombudsman does not enjoy the status, exemption and privileges available to the government.

However, checks and balances are maintained simultaneously. As expressly stipulated in The Ombudsman (Amendment) Ordinance 2001, the Ombudsman must each year submit a working report, accounts statement and auditor's report to the Chief Executive, which will then be submitted to the Legislative Council. It must also submit a report to LegCo on its resource management status. Therefore, it can be said that the Chief Executive and LegCo supervise its operation and management. Financially, the Director of Audit may in any financial year evaluate the efficiency of the Ombudsman without questioning its policy goals. As a separate legal entity, like other statutory bodies, the Ombudsman and the staff of its office are still subject to the Prevention of Bribery Ordinance.

=== Post-2001 - gradual development with growing focus on publicity initiatives ===
==== Increase in direct investigation ====
Come the turn of the 21st century, the HKSAR Ombudsman's Office had adopted a far more progressive outlook towards civic unification, and amendment within political and socio-economic maladministration, focusing notably on the use of modern resources to best ensure efficiency. Specifically, the Ombudsman's Office, from 2001, prioritised the conduct of a wider range of preliminary enquiries towards the direct investigation of issues, which allowed for a more effective assessment of the social and financial viability of proposed reform policies, prior to their implementation. For example, from 2003 to 2004 the annual Ombudsman's report referred to the need for a more analytical, or “global view”, towards addressing maladministration within Hong Kong, given the emergence of a set of identified patterns within public complaints, most notably, though not limited to, the “reluctance in enforcement”, along with interdepartmental coordination.

==== Publicity ====
Having acknowledged the discrepancies within the relationship between the public and the Ombudsman, the latter therefore embarked on increasing awareness as to its role, along with the prevalence of one's social, or civic duty, via a range of publicity initiatives, such as the wider use of media and technology to better inform Hong Kong's public not just as to what issues were of most importance to society, but more so how they could be more involved in facilitating social, political and economic paradigms, and bring about progress. This was best exemplified by the Ombudsman's Offices’ cooperation with Radio Television Hong Kong, over the production of an eight-episode television series, in 2013. Earlier implemented social initiatives had a near-immediate impact as well, as by 2005 the Ombudsman's Office had received a record-high 15,626 enquiries along with over 5,600 complaints, completing four direct investigations, symbolising a positive and progressive trend in public and civic interaction through to 2015–16, when eight direct investigations were completed.

==== Government departments’ perceptions of the Ombudsman ====
Despite exemplary developmental progress from within the Ombudsman's Office, after the handover going into the 21st century, its authority nonetheless came under question and was criticised on occasion. For example, during the 2013–2014 term, a government department the Ombudsman's Office over issues relating to its contractual obligations or protocol, during a sales contract between two parties. After investigation, the Ombudsman's Office reaffirmed their authority and jurisdiction over the matters under complaint, given the fact that the contract was not commercial in nature (thus under public sector review), and that its nature was against that of accepted policy.

== Controversies ==
=== Deletion of reports from the Ombudsman website ===
In May 2025, the Office of the Ombudsman came under fire for making only the last 3 years' worth of reports available on its website, a reduction from the 10 years of reports previously available. The Ombudsman justified the removal by stating that it had removed content that "no longer reflects the current situation" after a "thorough review", claiming that the removal would "prevent the website from being inundated with obsolete data" and improve public access to the website.

This was criticised by lawmakers and journalists as a regression in government openness and transparency, with Legislative Councillor Tik Chi-yuen expressing doubt about the veracity of the Ombudsman's claim that making 10 years' worth of reports would be a technical obstacle.

== List of Ombudsmen ==
No.	Name	Term began	Term ended	Length of term
1	Arthur Garcia, CBE, JP	1 February 1989	31 January 1994	5 years and 0 days
2	Andrew So, SBS, OBE, JP	1 February 1994	31 March 1999	5 years and 59 days
3	Alice Tai, GBS, OBE, JP	1 April 1999	31 March 2009	10 years and 0 days
4	Alan Lai, GBS, JP	1 April 2009	31 March 2014	5 years and 0 days
5	Connie Lau, SBS, JP	1 April 2014	31 March 2019	5 years and 0 days
6	Winnie Chiu, PDSM, PMSM	1 April 2019	31 March 2024	5 years and 0 days
7	Jack Chan	1 April 2024	Incumbent	2 years and 131 days

== See also ==
- Government of Hong Kong
- Ombudsman
- International Ombudsman Institute (IOI)
- Asian Ombudsman Association (AOA)
