= Ambrose Lee =

Hong Kong politician (1948–2022)

Ambrose Lee Siu-kwong GBS IDSM
- 李少光

Secretary for Security
- In office 5 August 2003 – 30 June 2012
- Chief Executive: Tung Chee-hwa; Donald Tsang
- Chief Secretary: Donald Tsang; Michael Suen; Rafael Hui; Henry Tang
- Undersecretary: Lai Tung-kwok
- Permanent Secretary: Chang King-yiu
- Political Assistant: Victor Lo
- Preceded by: Regina Ip
- Succeeded by: Lai Tung-kwok

Commissioner of the ICAC
- In office 1 July 2002 – 4 August 2003
- Preceded by: Alan Lai
- Succeeded by: Raymond Wong

Director of Immigration
- In office 1998–2002
- Preceded by: Regina Ip
- Succeeded by: Lai Tung-kwok

Personal details
- Born: 17 August 1948 British Hong Kong
- Died: 14 August 2022 (aged 73) Hong Kong
- Children: Glen Lee Lam-yan
- Education: Kowloon Technical School
- Alma mater: University of Hong Kong (BEng)

Ambrose Lee Siu-kwong
- Chinese: 李少光
Transcriptions
Standard Mandarin
- Hanyu Pinyin: Lǐ Shàoguāng
Yue: Cantonese
- Jyutping: lei5 siu3 gwong1

Ambrose Lee Siu-kwong GBS IDSM (Chinese: 李少光; 17 August 1948 – 14 August 2022) was a Hong Kong politician who held the position of Secretary for Security between 2003 and 2012. He also served as commissioner of the Independent Commission Against Corruption (ICAC) between 2002 and 2003, and as the director of immigration between 1998 and 2002.

== Education ==
Lee studied in Kowloon Technical School from 1961 to 1968, during which (after graduating secondary five) he briefly studied in the Hong Kong Technical College (now Hong Kong Polytechnic University) for a month. Lee received his bachelor's degree in electrical engineering from the University of Hong Kong.

== Career ==
Lee joined the civil service in 1974 as an immigration officer, rising through the ranks to become assistant director in 1995 and deputy director in 1997. He then served as the director of immigration from October 1998 to 2002.

In July 2002, Lee was appointed as commissioner of the ICAC by Chief Executive Tung Chee-hwa, becoming the first commissioner to have come from the disciplined services.

In August 2003, Lee joined Tung's administration as secretary for security, succeeding Regina Ip, who resigned after massive public protests over a proposed national security law. Lee steered the government's response to protests at the World Trade Organization Ministerial Conference of 2005 and to the 2010 Manila hostage crisis. Retiring on 30 June 2012, Lee served in the Hong Kong government for a total of 38 years and became the longest serving secretary for security (as of 2022).

After retirement, Lee served as a local deputy to the National People’s Congress between 2013 and 2018, and frequently made headlines for controversial remarks on current affairs. In 2016, he described young people involved in the 2016 Mong Kok civil unrest as "beasts" who had lost their conscience.

== Personal life ==
Lee has two children, including his only son, Glen Lee Lam-yan, who has been an artiste for local broadcaster TVB for more than two decades (as of 2022). Glen had previously told the media that the development of his acting career was limited by his father's post in the government, saying that he was always assigned to play "positive" roles.

== Death ==
Lee died in his sleep at his Sha Tin home on 14 August 2022, three days before his 74th birthday. He had earlier required hospitalisation after a fall that resulted in broken ribs.

Political offices
| Preceded by Regina Ip | Secretary for Security; 2003–2012 | Succeeded by Lai Tung-kwok |
Civic offices
| Preceded by Regina Ip | Director of Immigration; 1998–2002 | Succeeded by Lai Tung-kwok |
| Preceded by Alan Lai | Commissioner, Independent Commission Against Corruption; 2002–2003 | Succeeded by Raymond Wong |
Order of precedence
| Preceded by Anthony Wu; Recipients of the Gold Bauhinia Star | Hong Kong order of precedence Recipients of the Gold Bauhinia Star | Succeeded by York Chow; Recipients of the Gold Bauhinia Star |
