= Alan Lai =

Hong Kong politician (born 1951)

GBS, JP Alan Lai Nin
- 黎年

Commissioner of the Independent Commission Against Corruption
- In office 15 July 1999 – 30 June 2002
- Preceded by: Lily Yam
- Succeeded by: Ambrose Lee

The Ombudsman of Hong Kong
- In office 1 April 2009 – 31 March 2014
- Preceded by: Alice Tai
- Succeeded by: Connie Lau

Personal details
- Born: June 3, 1951 (age 75)
- Education: University of Hong Kong

Alan Lai Nin GBS, JP (Chinese: 黎年, born 3 June 1951) is a Hong Kong politician and civil servant who served as the Director-General of the Trade and Industry Department from 1996 to 1999, Commissioner of the Independent Commission Against Corruption from 1999 to 2002 and the Ombudsman of the Office of the Ombudsman from 2009 until his retirement in 2014. He is now a consultant with the Independent Police Complaints Council.

In 2015, Lai was appointed as Commissioner of the Inquiry into the incidents of excess lead found in drinking water.

== Awards ==
- 2003: Gold Bauhinia Star
- 2009: Justice of the Peace

Political offices
Preceded by Lily Yam	Commissioner of the Independent Commission Against Corruption; 1999 – 2002	Succeeded by Ambrose Lee
Preceded by Alice Tai	The Ombudsman of Hong Kong; 2009 – 2014	Succeeded by Connie Lau
