= Martin Rowlands (civil servant) =

British civil servant

John Martin Rowlands, CBE (Chinese: 羅能士; 20 July 1925 – 19 August 2004) was a British civil servant working in the Hong Kong government from 1952 to 1985. He was the Secretary for the Civil Service from 1978 to 1985 and official member of the Legislative Council of Hong Kong from 1978 to 1984.

Rowlands was born in London on 20 July 1925 and graduated from the Charterhouse School and the Selwyn College, Cambridge. From 1943 to 1947, he was a Captain of the Royal Indian Artillery Field Regiment of the HQ XV Indian Corps, HQ Allied Land Forces South East Asia.

Rowlands joined the Hong Kong government as a cadet in 1952. He served on various positions, including the Resettlement Department, New Territories Administration, Civil Aid Service and Urban Services Department. In 1966, he became the Deputy Director of Urban Services, Principal Assistant Colonial Secretary in 1968 and Deputy Secretary for Home Affairs in 1971. In 1974, he became the Director of Immigration in 1974 and dealt with the Touch Base Policy imposed in 1974, as well as the Vietnamese boat people crisis.

He was appointed Secretary for the Civil Service in 1978 and became an official member of the Legislative Council of Hong Kong. He dealt with the civil servants' strikes and localisation of the Hong Kong civil service during the transition period to the handover of Hong Kong. He was appointed Commander of the Order of the British Empire (CBE) in the 1980 Birthday Honours.

He retired in 1985 and returned to Britain. He fought against cancer in his later life and died in London on 19 August 2004, aged 79.

He married Christiane Germaine Maeleine Lacheny and had children Diane and Noelle. He was a bird watching lover, which influenced his subordinate Donald Tsang, the later Chief Executive of Hong Kong.

Government offices
Preceded by W. E. Collard	Director of Immigration; 1974–1978	Succeeded by R. G. B. Bridge
Preceded by R. G. B. Bridge	Secretary for the Civil Service; 1978–1985	Succeeded by David Robert Ford
