= Director of Immigration =

- 入境事務處處長
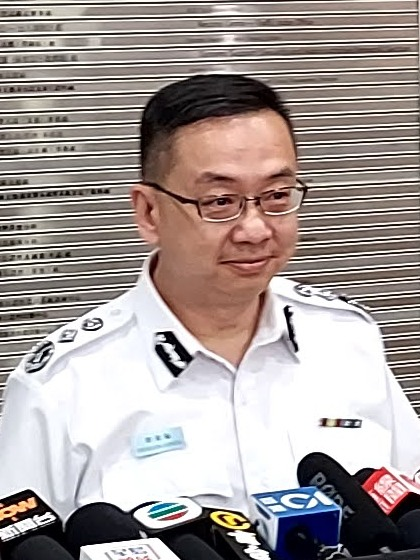
- Incumbent; Benson Kwok since 19 September 2023
- Nominator: Chief Executive of Hong Kong (since 1997)
- Appointer: Central People's Government of China (since 1997); Governor of Hong Kong (until 1997)
- First holder: J Moore; Regina Ip (since 1997)
- Deputy: Deputy Director of Immigration
- Salary: GDS(C) 4 (HK$181,450)
- Website: Official website

Director of Immigration
- Traditional Chinese: 入境事務處處長
- Simplified Chinese: 入境事务处处长
Transcriptions
Standard Mandarin
- Hanyu Pinyin: Rùjìng Shìwù Chǔ Chùzhǎng
Yue: Cantonese
- Yale Romanization: Yahp gíng sih mouh chyu chyu jéung
- Jyutping: Jap6 ging2 si6 mou6 cyu3 cyu3 zoeng2

The Director of Immigration is the head of the Immigration Department of the Hong Kong Government, which is responsible for immigration issues and controlling entry ports into Hong Kong.

The Director of Immigration is simultaneously appointed as the Commissioner of Registration, dealing with the registration of persons. Additionally, the Director of Immigration is also appointed as the Registrar of Births and Deaths and the Registrar of Marriages.

== List of Directors of Immigration ==
	Portrait	Name	Term of office		
1		J. Moore 穆雅	1961	1965	
2		W. E. Collard 戈立	1965	1974	
3		J. M. Rowlands 羅能士	1974	1978	
4		R. G. B. Bridge 布立之	1978	1983	
5		A. J. Carter 賈達德	1983	1989	Last British Director
6		Laurence Leung Ming-yin 梁銘彥	1989	1996	
7		Regina Ip Lau Suk-yee 葉劉淑儀	1996	30 June 1997	
Handover of Hong Kong
1		Regina Ip Lau Suk-yee 葉劉淑儀	1 July 1997	1998	
2		Ambrose Lee Siu-kwong 李少光	1998	2002	
3		Lai Tung-kwok 黎楝國	1 July 2002	7 April 2008	
4		Simon Peh Yun-lu 白韞六	7 April 2008	28 March 2011	
5		Eric Chan 陳國基	28 March 2011	5 April 2016	
6		Erick Tsang 曾國衞	5 April 2016	22 April 2020	
7		Au Ka-wang 區嘉宏	2 July 2020	19 September 2023	
8		Benson Kwok 郭俊峯	19 September 2023	Incumbent	
