= Ronald Bridge =

British colonial civil servant

Ronald George Blacker Bridge, CBE, JP (September 1932 – 14 April 2001), was a British colonial civil servant in Hong Kong. He had been Secretary for the Civil Service, Director of Immigration, Commissioner for Labour and Secretary for Education and Manpower in the late 1970s and 1980s.

He was born in Singapore in 1932 and was graduated from Lincoln College, Oxford, with a master's degree in philosophy and history. He joined the colonial civil service in 1957 and had served in various positions. He served in the Resettlement Department and Lands Department and became Deputy Secretary for Security, Deputy Secretary for the Civil Service and Secretary for the Civil Service from 1977 to 1978, Director of Immigration from 1978 to 1983, Commissioner for Labour from 1983 to 1986 and Secretary for Education and Manpower from 1986 to 1989. He was also an official member of the Legislative Council of Hong Kong.

For his public services, he was made an Officer of the Order of the British Empire (OBE) in the 1985 Birthday Honours and Commander of the Order of the British Empire (CBE) in the 1990 New Year Honours.

Government offices
Preceded by Alan James Scott	Secretary for the Civil Service; 1977–1978	Succeeded by John Martin Rowlands
Preceded by John Martin Rowlands	Director of Immigration; 1978–1983	Succeeded by Alan John Carter
Preceded by James Neil Henderson	Commissioner for Labour; 1983–1986	Succeeded by Joseph Hammond
Preceded by James Neil Henderson	Secretary for Education and Manpower; 1986–1989	Succeeded by Yeung Kai-yin
