= Kowloon Technical School =

Coordinates: 22.33360°N 114.15910°E

Kowloon Technical School 九龍工業學校

Location
- 332 - 334 Cheung Sha Wan Road, Kowloon, Hong Kong

Information
- Type: Government Secondary School
- Motto: "Thorough" 「貫徹始終」
- Established: 11 September 1961; 63 years ago
- Principal: Ms.Wu Lai Wan
- Enrollment: around 650
- Houses: Halliwell (Red), Lau (Yellow), School (Blue), Cho (Green)
- Information: (852) 2386 0737
- Website: https://www.kts.edu.hk/

Kowloon Technical School
- Traditional Chinese: 九龍工業學校
- Simplified Chinese: 九龙工业学校
Transcriptions
Standard Mandarin
- Hanyu Pinyin: Jiǔlóng Gōngyèxuéxiào
Yue: Cantonese
- Jyutping: gau2 lung4 gung1 jip6 hok6 haau6

Kowloon Technical School (Chinese: 九龍工業學校) is a technical secondary school founded by the Hong Kong Government in Sham Shui Po, Kowloon, Hong Kong near Cheung Sha Wan station. The school motto is Thorough (貫徹始終).

== Structure ==
The school is run as a government technical secondary school, emphasizing on Whole Person Education (全人教育). In addition to the typical secondary school curriculum, KTS enriches their students with a wide range of subjects including technical, commerce, civil education, and information technology. The list of elective subjects includes literature, science, social science, informational technology, and commerce. In the 2005-06 academic year, the school has a total of 29 classes. There are 5 classes each from Form 1 - 5 (7th - 11th grade), and 2 classes each from Form 6 - 7 (12th - 13th grade).

== Features ==
Kowloon Technical School provides their students with a strong curriculum in science and technology. Together with the traditional science and technology education, students can learn advanced subjects ranging from information technology, graphic communications, to electronics.

General personal development is another area of emphasis. Students develop their skills and abilities through the study of a wide range of subjects including physical education, music, arts, civic education, general studies, etc.

== History ==
Originally called Sham Shui Po Technical School, the school was founded on 11 September 1961. In 1964, it merged with Fuk Wah Secondary Modern School (福華街實用中學) and was renamed as Kowloon Technical School. As a result of the merger, the school became the largest secondary school in Hong Kong at the time. In the late 1960s and 1970s, Kowloon Technical School had more than 1900 students with 51 classes. However, due to rapid development of other areas in Kowloon, families have started to move to new areas away from Sham Shui Po. The student population has gradually reduced to around 1100.

In 1997, the Review of Prevocational and Secondary Technical Education proposed that technical schools change their name by removing the labelling terms. Kowloon Technical School was invited to change their name to Kowloon Government Secondary School (九龍官立中學). However, due to the strong objections from the school administration, the original name of the school was preserved.

In 1998, the teaching language was changed from English to Chinese. In 1999, the School Management Committee of Government Schools was founded.

== Notable alumni ==
- Vincent Cheng – HSBC Asia Pacific President
- Ambrose Lee Siu-kwong – Secretary for Security from 2003 to 2012
- Albert Cheng – LegCo member
- Ka-Ki Kwok – LegCo member
- Ming-Yum Ng – former LegCo member (deceased)
- Anthony Wong Yiu-ming – singer
- Edward Yiu – LegCo member

== See also ==
- Education in Hong Kong
- Lists of schools in Hong Kong
