= Alan Carter (civil servant) =

British and Hong Kong civil servant (1929–2016)

Alan Carter CBE ISO JP
- 賈達德
- Born: 5 August 1929; Medway, Kent, United Kingdom
- Died: 1 April 2016 (aged 86); Bournemouth, Dorset, United Kingdom
- Occupation: Immigration official

Alan John Carter CBE ISO JP (Chinese: 賈達德; 5 August 1929 – 1 April 2016) was a British and Hong Kong immigration official. He was the Director of Immigration of Hong Kong from 1983 to 1989, being the last expatriate to hold the office. He died in April 2016 at the age of 86.

== Career ==
=== Early career ===
Carter joined the Civil Service in 1949 as an executive officer in the Ministry of Works. He was appointed, on in-service transfer, as an Immigration Officer of the Immigration Branch of the Home Office in 1955 and was promoted Chief Immigration Officer in 1963.

=== Career progression ===
In 1966, he was posted to Hong Kong, then a British crown colony, as a Principal Immigration Inspector and was subsequently promoted to the ranks of Assistant Director and Deputy Director of the Immigration Department in 1971 and 1978 respectively. Before becoming Director in 1983, he had been responsible for tackling the influx of illegal immigrants from the mainland China as well as the influx of Vietnamese boatpeople. He assisted in implementing the "immediate repatriation upon arrest" policy in 1980.

When Carter was Director of Immigration, the Sino-British Joint Declaration of 1984 confirmed the transfer of Hong Kong to the People's Republic of China in 1997. Against this background, he took part in a number of expert meetings under the Sino-British Joint Liaison Group, in the capacity of expert delegate on behalf of the United Kingdom, to negotiate with the Chinese on a number of immigration-related issues, such as the nationality and passport of the Hong Kong people after 1997. These meetings, in which Regina Ip was one of his assistants, resulted in the introduction of the second-generation computerised Hong Kong identity card as well as the British National (Overseas) passport in 1987.

== Recognition ==
In recognition of his public service, Carter was awarded the Imperial Service Order (ISO) in 1980, the Hong Kong Disciplined Services Medal in 1987 and the Commander of the Order of the British Empire in 1988. He was appointed an official Justice of the Peace from 1971 to 1989.

As Hong Kong and China started to develop closer ties in the 1980s, Carter opened a number of new immigration checkpoints and facilities, including the Sha Tau Kok and Lok Ma Chau Control Points, the new Hong Kong-Macau Ferry Terminal in Sheung Wan and the China Ferry Terminal in Tsim Sha Tsui, etc. He was also noted for assisting in executing the "screening policy" in 1988 in order to prepare for systematic repatriation of the Vietnamese boatpeople.

== Footnotes ==
Government offices
Preceded by Ronald Bridge	Director of Immigration; 1983–1989	Succeeded by Laurence Leung
