= Benson Kwok =

Director of Immigration, Hong Kong

The Honourable Benson Kwok IDSM
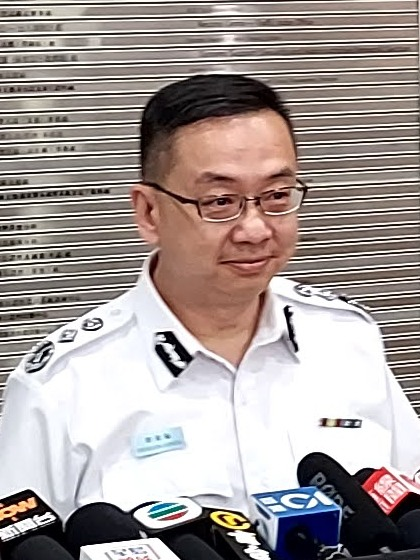

Director of Immigration
- Incumbent
- Assumed office 19 September 2023
- Chief Executive: John Lee
- Preceded by: Au Ka-wang

Personal details
- Born: 1969 (age 56–57) British Hong Kong
- Education: SKH Saint Benedicts School; Lung Cheung Government Secondary School
- Alma mater: University of Hong Kong (MPA); Monash University (BBA)

Benson Kwok Joon-fung IDSM (born 1969) is a Hong Kong politician and the current Director of Immigration. Kwok joined the department in 1989 and served as the deputy director of Immigration in 2022.

== Controversy ==
In 2021, HK01 reported that China Evergrande Group had sent Benson expensive presents, and that Benson did not file it on record while the rules require him to, journalists hence suspect that he was accepting bribes, which was illegal. Today, the head of China Evergrande Group has received a sentence for life for many counts of financial crimes, Benson has not been charged for the possible wrongdoing mentioned above and the CPC's State Council has given him a promotion from deputy director to director, causing more public concern about the worsening of Mainland-Hong Kong cross-border corruption.

Preceded by Au Ka-wang	Director of Immigration; 2023–present	Succeeded by Incumbent
