= Lai Tung-kwok =

Hong Kong politician

The Honourable Lai Tung-kwok GBS IDSM JP
- 黎棟國
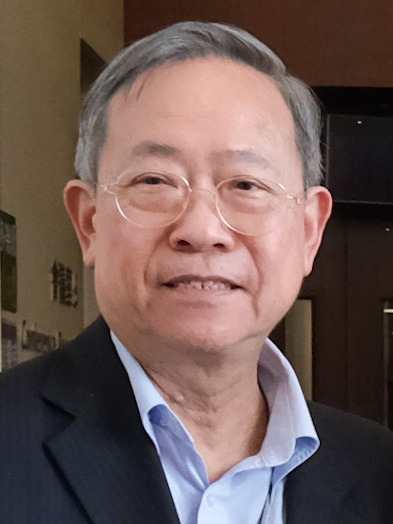
- Lai in 2023

Member of the Legislative Council
- In office 1 January 2022 – 31 December 2025
- Preceded by: Constituency created
- Constituency: Election Committee

Secretary for Security
- In office 1 July 2012 – 30 June 2017
- Chief Executive: Leung Chun-ying
- Preceded by: Ambrose Lee
- Succeeded by: John Lee

Under Secretary for Security
- In office 2 November 2009 – 30 June 2012
- Preceded by: Position established
- Succeeded by: John Lee

Director of Immigration
- In office 2002–2008
- Preceded by: Ambrose Lee
- Succeeded by: Simon Peh

Personal details
- Born: 12 November 1951 (age 74) Hong Kong
- Party: New People's Party

Lai Tung-kwok
- Traditional Chinese: 黎棟國
- Simplified Chinese: 黎栋国
Transcriptions
Standard Mandarin
- Hanyu Pinyin: Lí Dòngguó
Yue: Cantonese
- Jyutping: lai4 dung3 gwok3

Lai Tung-kwok, GBS, IDSM, JP (Chinese: 黎棟國; Jyutping: lai4 dung3 gwok3; born 12 November 1951 in Hong Kong) is a Hong Kong politician and retired civil servant. He was formerly Secretary for Security between 2012 and 2017, and a member of the Legislative Council for the Election Committee constituency between 2022 and 2025. At the early stage of his ministerial career he served as the Under Secretary for Security and Director of Immigration.

== Early life and education ==
Lai was born in British Hong Kong in 1951 to a family with ancestral roots in the town of Beijiao in Guangdong. He attended Maryknoll Fathers' School, a Catholic school in Sham Shui Po, from 1957 to 1968, and later obtained a Bachelor of Laws from the University of London External Programmes. Before joining the civil service, Lai briefly worked as a history teacher at the Caritas St Godfrey Prevocational School (now the Caritas Chong Yuet Ming Secondary School).

== Civil service career (1973-2009) ==
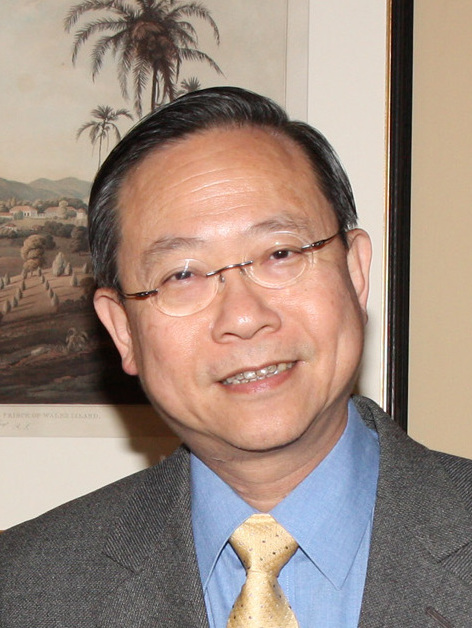
Lai in 2013

Lai joined the Hong Kong civil service as an Assistant Immigration Officer in December 1973. He was promoted to Immigration Officer in September 1980, Senior Immigration Officer in September 1986, Chief Immigration Officer in February 1990, Assistant Principal Immigration Officer in May 1992, Principal Immigration Officer in October 1995, Senior Principal Immigration Officer in April 1997 and to Assistant Director of Immigration in February 1999. He was promoted to Deputy Director of Immigration in January 2001. Lai was appointed Director of Immigration in July 2002. He ceased to be Director of Immigration in April 2008 and retired in 2009 when he was succeeded by Simon Peh.

== Political career (2009-present) ==
=== Ministerial career ===
In 2009, he was appointed as the Under Secretary for Security, a newly created political appointment under the Political Appointments System. On 1 July 2012, Lai joined Leung Chun-ying's cabinet as Secretary for Security of Hong Kong. As head of the Security Bureau, he was responsible for overseeing most of Hong Kong's disciplined services. He left office when Carrie Lam succeeded Leung Chun-ying as Chief Executive in 2017.

Lai was elected to the 13th Chinese People's Political Consultative Conference as a member of the Hong Kong delegation in January 2018. In August of the same year, he joined the New People's Party, and became the Executive Vice-Chairman of the party.

=== Legislative Council ===
In the 2021 Legislative Council election, which was the first election after the 2021 electoral changes, Lai ran for a seat in the Election Committee constituency as a member of the New People's Party. He was successfully elected with 1,237 votes, coming 19th in the block vote constituency.

In February 2022, Lai told SCMP that he would be attending the 2022 Two Sessions as a Hong Kong delegate.

Lai was elected as chairman of the Legislative Council's Panel on Constitutional Affairs on 16 January 2024 and was re-elected to the position in January 2025. He decided to step down from the Legislative Council in October 2025, along with party chair and another ex-security minister Regina Ip.

== Controversies ==
=== Remarks on alcohol and rape cases ===
While speaking at a Fight Crime Committee press conference on 14 May 2013 in his capacity as Secretary for Security, Lai remarked in response to a recent rise in rape cases that "some of these cases also involved the victims being raped after drinking quite a lot of alcohol, so I would appeal that young ladies should not drink too much". The statement was criticised by women's groups as putting the blame on rape victims instead of perpetrators, with Democratic Party lawmaker Helena Wong calling on Lai to apologise. In response, Lai denied that he meant to lay responsibility on the victims, and said that he would "humbly listen" to the opinions that he had received. A spokesman for his department said that Lai had only intended to highlight the ways through which perpetrators took advantage of their victims, and did not mean to blame rape victims.

=== Falling asleep during Council meeting ===
On 7 January 2014, during a Legislative Council meeting discussing a second round of consultation for the proposed 2017 electoral reform, Lai was seen falling asleep for around 20 minutes while then-Chief Secretary Carrie Lam was speaking for the government. A Security Bureau spokesperson later said that Lai was feeling unwell and had taken some cold medicine before attending the meeting.

=== Partygate ===
On 5 January 2022, Chief Executive Carrie Lam announced new warnings and restrictions against social gatherings due to potential COVID-19 outbreaks. One day later, it was discovered that Lai attended a birthday party hosted by Witman Hung Wai-man, with 222 guests. At least one guest tested positive with COVID-19, causing all guests to be quarantined. Lai had been warned by Legislative Council president Andrew Leung not to attend any meetings until after finishing his last mandatory Covid-19 test on 22 January 2022. However, he decided to attend the meeting on 19 January 2022, against Leung's orders.

Government offices
Preceded by Ambrose Lee	Director of Immigration; 2002–2008	Succeeded by Simon Peh
Political offices
Preceded by New position	Under Secretary for Security; 2009–2012	Succeeded by John Lee
Preceded by Ambrose Lee	Secretary for Security; 2012–2017	Succeeded by John Lee
Legislative Council of Hong Kong
New constituency	Member of Legislative Council; Representative for Election Committee; 2022–2025	Succeeded by
Order of precedence
Preceded by Choi Pak-lai; Recipients of the Gold Bauhinia Star	Hong Kong order of precedence Recipients of the Gold Bauhinia Star	Succeeded by Chan Kam-lam; Recipients of the Gold Bauhinia Star
