= Au Ka-wang =

Director of Immigration, Hong Kong

The Honourable Au Ka-wang IDSM
- 區嘉宏
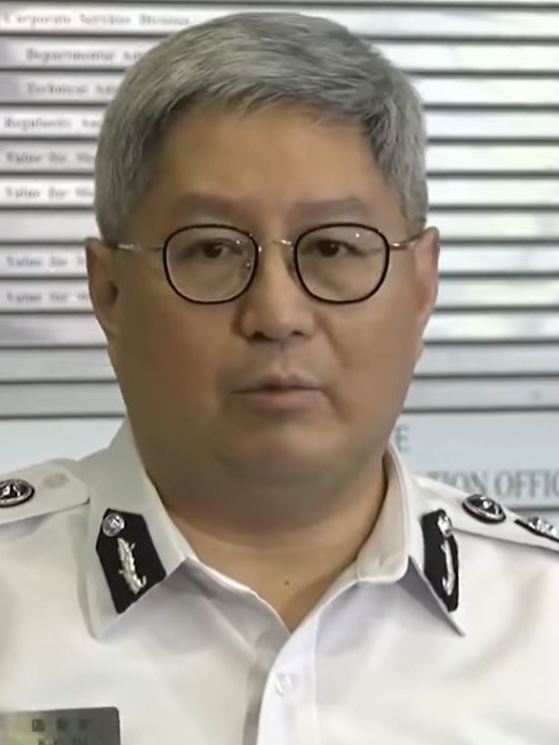

Director of Immigration
- In office 2 July 2020 – 19 September 2023; Acting: 23 April 2020 - 1 July 2020
- Chief Executive: Carrie Lam; John Lee
- Preceded by: Erick Tsang
- Succeeded by: Benson Kwok

Personal details
- Born: 1967 (age 58–59) British Hong Kong

Au Ka-wang
- Traditional Chinese: 區嘉宏
- Simplified Chinese: 區嘉宏
Transcriptions
Standard Mandarin
- Hanyu Pinyin: Ōu Jiāhóng
Yue: Cantonese
- Yale Romanization: Ngāu Gāa Wàhng
- Jyutping: Au1 Gaa1 Wang4

Au Ka-wang IDSM (Chinese: 區嘉宏; born 1967) is a Hong Kong politician who served as the Director of Immigration. During his tenure, Au had been criticised for breaking social distancing rules and raised concerns of misconduct after a luxurious meal with business executives.

== Career ==
He joined the Immigration Department in November 1988 as an Assistant Immigration Officer. In 1992, he was promoted to Immigration Officer. In 2003, he was promoted to Senior Immigration Officer. He was then promoted to Chief Immigration Officer in 2009, to Assistant Principal Immigration Officer in 2014 and to Principal Immigration Officer in 2015. He was elevated to Assistant Director of Immigration in 2018 and Deputy Director of Immigration in 2019. He has been the acting Director of Immigration since 23 April 2020 when Director Erick Tsang became Secretary for Constitutional and Mainland Affairs, until the State Council officially appointed him as Director on 2 July 2020.

In July 2021, it was revealed that Au was fined for breaking social-distancing rules by attending a banquet dinner of Evergrande Group at a luxury clubhouse.

On 5 January 2022, Carrie Lam announced new warnings and restrictions against social gathering due to potential COVID-19 outbreaks. One day later, it was discovered that Au attended a birthday party hosted by Witman Hung Wai-man, with 222 guests. At least one guest tested positive with COVID-19, causing all guests to be quarantined. Au failed to show authorities his check-in time at the venue with the "LeaveHomeSafe" app, mandatory for all visitors at restaurants. According to Lam, Au claimed to have "only stayed for a very short time, and did not enter the restaurant's core area". He was ordered to take leave until 24 January.

Au retired on 19 September 2023 and was succeeded by Benson Kwok Joon-fung, Deputy Director of Immigration, who was also embroiled in the Evergrande-scandal and probed for accepting gifts from an executive director of the company.

== Personal life ==
In August 2022, Au tested positive for COVID-19.
