= Timothy Tong =

Hong Kong government official (born 1949)

Timothy Tong Hin-ming GBS
- 湯顯明

Commissioner of the ICAC
- In office 1 July 2007 – 30 June 2012
- Preceded by: Fanny Law
- Succeeded by: Simon Peh

Commissioner of Customs and Excise
- In office 29 September 2003 – July 2007
- Preceded by: Raymond Wong
- Succeeded by: Richard Yuen

Personal details
- Born: July 12, 1949 (age 76)

Timothy Tong Hin-ming GBS (traditional Chinese: 湯顯明; simplified Chinese: 汤显明; pinyin: Tāng Xiǎnmíng) born 12 July 1949, is a former commissioner for the Independent Commission Against Corruption of Hong Kong. Prior to that, he was Commissioner of Customs and Excise for the Customs and Excise Department of Hong Kong.

Tong studied at Diocesan Boys' School for secondary education, and graduated from Chinese University of Hong Kong. He joined the Government of Hong Kong in November 1972 and served as an officer in the Executive Department and Trade and Industry Department. In April 1992, he joined the political branch of the government. In April 2005, he received a promotion into a senior position in Home Affairs Department and was reassigned in many executive position within the government departments. In January 1999, he served as Undersecretary for Security in Security Bureau of Hong Kong. In September 2003, Tong was appointed as Commissioner of Customs and Excise for the Customs and Excise Department of Hong Kong. On 1 July 2007, he was appointed as Commissioner, Independent Commission Against Corruption (ICAC).

Timothy Tong was serving under Regina Ip when he was the Undersecretary for Security in the Security Bureau of Hong Kong, and together they helped advocating the passage of Hong Kong Basic Law Article 23. Tong's role in lobbying public support on the bill led to criticism on his violation of political neutrality. Protests against this bill resulted in a massive demonstration on 1 July 2003. In the aftermath, two Executive Committee members resigned and the bill was withdrawn after it became clear that it would not get the necessary support from the Legislative Council for it to be passed. The bill was then shelved indefinitely.

In 2013, Tong became the subject of a special inquiry launched by Hong Kong's Legislative Council after serious allegations surfaced regarding gifts and other expense claims he made during his ICAC tenure.

Government offices
Preceded by Raymond Wong	Commissioner of Customs and Excise; 2003–2007	Succeeded by Richard Yuen
Preceded by Fanny Law	Commissioner, Independent Commission Against Corruption; 2007–2012	Succeeded by Simon Peh
Order of precedence
Preceded by Rita Lau; Recipients of the Gold Bauhinia Star	Hong Kong order of precedence Recipients of the Gold Bauhinia Star	Succeeded by Benjamin Tang; Recipients of the Gold Bauhinia Star
