= Simon Peh =

Hong Kong government official (born 1955)

Simon Peh Yun-lu GBS IDSM JP
- 白韞六

President of the International Association of Anti-Corruption Authorities
- Incumbent
- Assumed office 5 January 2022
- Preceded by: Ali bin Fetais Al-Marri

Commissioner of the ICAC
- In office 1 July 2012 – 30 June 2022
- Preceded by: Timothy Tong
- Succeeded by: Woo Ying-ming

Director of Immigration
- In office 7 April 2008 – 28 March 2011
- Preceded by: Lai Tung-kwok
- Succeeded by: Eric Chan

Personal details
- Born: 1955 (age 70–71)
- Education: Pui Ching Middle School; Chinese University of Hong Kong; University of California, Berkeley; King's College London

Simon Peh
- Traditional Chinese: 白韞六
- Simplified Chinese: 白韫六
Transcriptions
Standard Mandarin
- Hanyu Pinyin: Baí Yùnliù
Yue: Cantonese
- Jyutping: baak6 wan3 luk6
- Sidney Lau: baak6 wan3 luk6
Southern Min
- Hokkien POJ: Pe̍h Ùn-lio̍k

Simon Peh Yun-lu GBS IDSM JP (Chinese: 白韞六, born 1955) was Director of Immigration of Hong Kong, and was appointed Commissioner of the Independent Commission Against Corruption in 2012.

== Early life and education ==
Peh was born in Anxi County, Quanzhou, Fujian. graduated from Pui Ching Middle School in 1973. He completed college in 1978.

== Career ==
Peh joined the Immigration Department as an Immigration Officer. In 1984, he was promoted to Senior Immigration Officer, and Chief Immigration Officer in 1991. In 2004, he began serving as Assistant Director of Immigration. In April 2008, Peh was appointed Director of Immigration when his predecessor Lai Tung-kwok accepted the post of Under Secretary for Security. He retired from the Immigration Department in April 2011. He was succeeded by Eric Chan.

== Personal life ==
On 5 January 2022, Carrie Lam announced new warnings and restrictions against social gathering due to potential COVID-19 outbreaks. One day later, it was discovered that Peh attended a birthday party hosted by Witman Hung Wai-man, with 222 guests. At least one guest tested positive with COVID-19, causing all guests to be quarantined. He was ordered to take leave until 24 January.

Government offices
| Preceded by Lai Tung-kwok | Director of Immigration; 2008–2011 | Succeeded by Eric Chan |
| Preceded by Timothy Tong | Commissioner, Independent Commission Against Corruption; 2012–2022 | Succeeded by Woo Ying-ming |
