= CCC Heep Woh College =

Secondary school in Kowloon, Hong Kong

- 中華基督教會協和書院
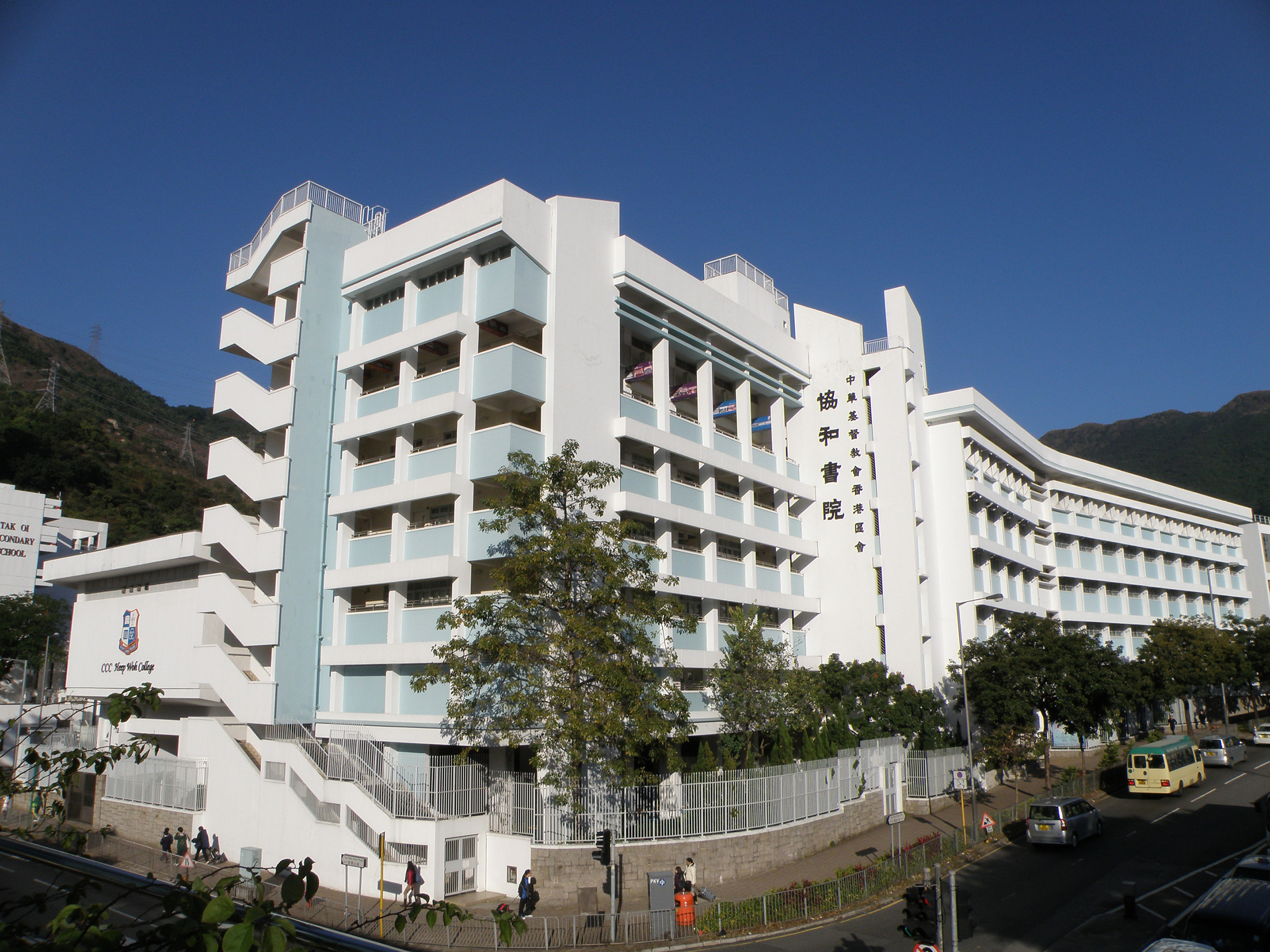

Location
- 171, Po Kong Village Road, Tsz Wan Shan; Hong Kong; China; 22°20′48″N 114°12′17″E

Information
- Type: Hong Kong Secondary School
- Motto: 爾識真理，真理釋爾 (When you know the TRUTH, The truth will set you free)
- Religious affiliation: Christianity
- Established: 1970
- Principal: Mr. Lui Ho Wing
- Staff: 60 people
- Enrollment: approx. 1,200 people
- Area: 4,654 m²
- Affiliation: Hong Kong Council of the Church of Christ in China
- Website: www.ccchwc.edu.hk

CCC Heep Woh College
- Traditional Chinese: 中華基督教會協和書院
- Simplified Chinese: 中华基督教会协和书院
Transcriptions
Standard Mandarin
- Hanyu Pinyin: Zhōnghuá Jīdūjiào Huì Xiéhé Shūyuàn
Yue: Cantonese
- Jyutping: zung1 waa4 gei1 duk1 gaau3 wui6*2 hip3 wo4 syu1 jyun6*2

The Church of Christ in China Heep Woh College (Chinese: 中華基督教會協和書院) is a Christian secondary school in Tsz Wan Shan, Kowloon, Hong Kong. The college is a standard grammar school founded by The Hong Kong Council of the Church of Christ in China. The school has a student body of approximately 1,200, aged 11 to 20, and is led by 57 teachers. Most courses are taught in English.

== History ==
In 1911, Mrs. Lear Bigelow, from the United States, founded the Heep Woh Kindergarten in Xiguan, Guangzhou, dedicated to early childhood education. In 1947 and 1970, respectively, the Hong Kong Council of the Church of Christ in China established CCC Heep Woh Primary School and CCC Heep Woh College.

In 1998, a management committee was established to oversee school operations and set targets and priorities for school development. This committee is composed of the School Supervisor, Principal, Vice-Principals, representatives of teachers, parents, alumni and the C.C.C.

== School badge ==
The school badge consists of two main parts - the shield and the ribbon. The former comprises the open bible with the Greek words "Jesus is the Christ", the "Nestorian Cross", the seal with the school name written in Chinese clerical script and the interconnected three "Cs". The latter incorporates the name of the school in English.
