= Commissioner of the Independent Commission Against Corruption =

Head of anti-corruption body of Hong Kong

- 廉政專員
- Incumbent; Woo Ying-ming since 1 July 2022
- Style: The Honourable
- Appointer: Central People's Government (via nomination by the Chief Executive)
- Inaugural holder: Sir Jack Cater
- Formation: 15 February 1974
- Website: ICAC

The Commissioner of the Independent Commission Against Corruption heads the body that is responsible for investigating corruption in both the public and private realms in Hong Kong. The ICAC was created in 1974 to deal with the corruption then endemic in Hong Kong's government departments and disciplined services.

== List of office holders ==
All ICAC commissioners have been appointed from the ranks of Hong Kong's civil service or, prior to 1997, from among colonial officials.

No.	Name	Took office	Left office	Tenure
1	Sir Jack Cater	15 February 1974	3 July 1978	4 years and 139 days
2	Sir Donald Luddington	4 July 1978	10 November 1980	2 years and 130 days
3	Peter Williams	11 November 1980	31 December 1984	4 years and 51 days
4	Geoffrey Barnes	1 January 1985	28 February 1988	3 years and 59 days
5	David Jeaffreson	29 February 1988	30 November 1991	3 years and 276 days
6	Peter Allan	1 December 1991	28 November 1992	364 days (died in office)
7	Bertrand de Speville	22 February 1993	21 January 1996	2 years and 334 days
8	Michael Leung Man-kin	22 January 1996	31 March 1997	1 year and 69 days
9	Lily Yam Kwan Pui-ying	1 April 1997	11 July 1999	2 years and 102 days
10	Alan Lai Nin	15 July 1999	30 June 2002	4 years and 351 days
11	Ambrose Lee Siu-kwong	1 July 2002	4 August 2003	1 year and 35 days
12	Raymond Wong Hung-chiu	25 August 2003	30 October 2006	3 years and 67 days
13	Fanny Law Fan Chiu-fun	30 October 2006	30 June 2007	244 days
14	Timothy Tong Hin-ming	1 July 2007	30 June 2012	5 years and 0 days
15	Simon Peh Yun-lu	1 July 2012	30 June 2022	10 years and 0 days
16	Woo Ying-ming	1 July 2022	Incumbent	4 years and 69 days

=== Appointment controversies ===
In October 2006, the appointment of Fanny Law as ICAC Commissioner was not well received. The unpopular Permanent Secretary for Education and Manpower was seen as weak on security-related issues. In addition, as Law's and Raymond Wong's appointments were a direct swap, the government was derided by the Civic Party and Liberal Party for belittling an important position by playing "musical chairs". Law was not perceived to be at the end of her civil service career, when the post of Commissioner was traditionally a 'final' posting, allowing the official to work without fear or favour.
