= Fanny Law =

Hong Kong politician (born 1953)

The Honourable Fanny Law Fan Chiu-fun GBM GBS JP
- 羅范椒芬
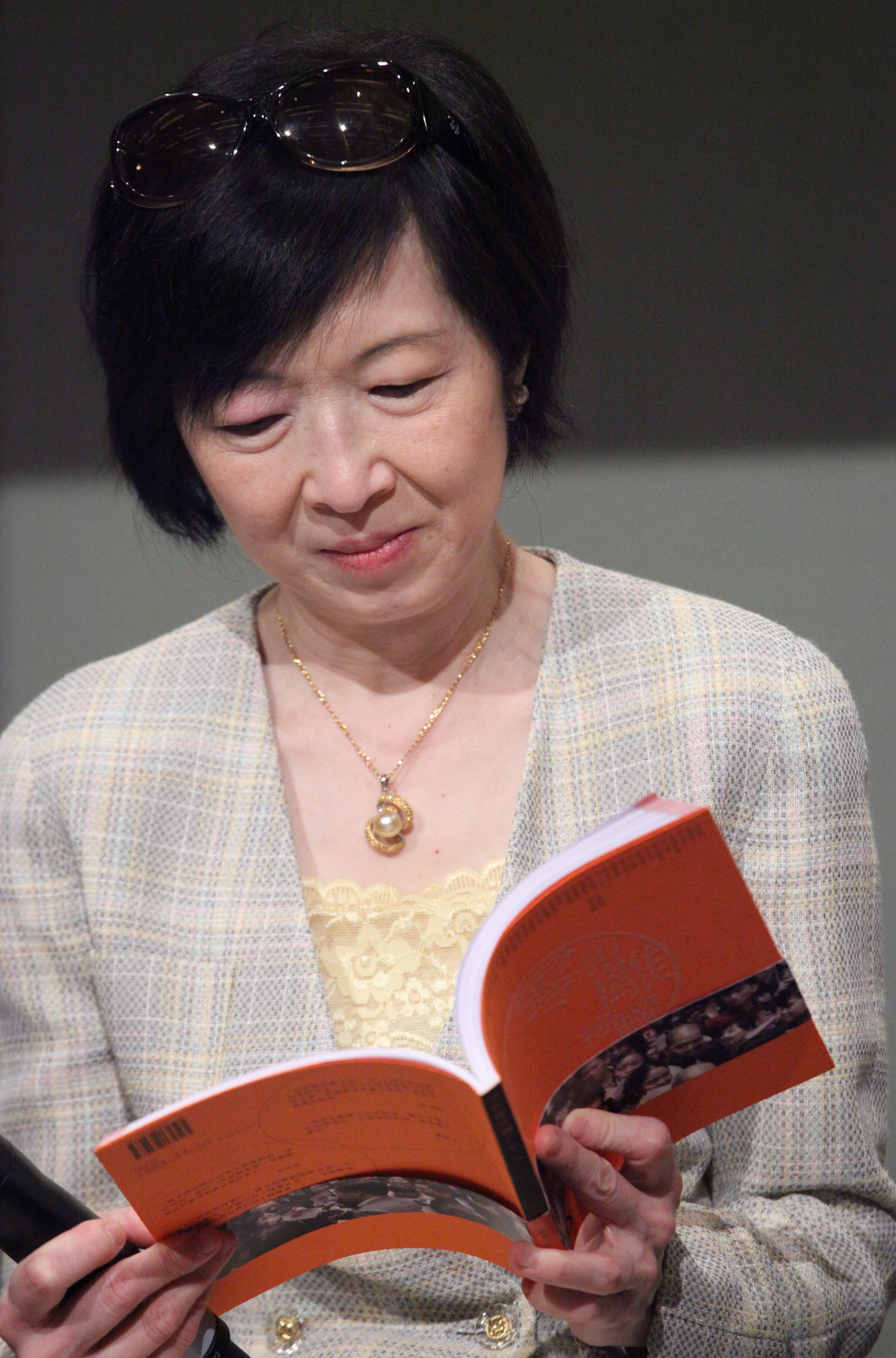

Non-Official Member of Executive Council of Hong Kong
- In office 1 July 2012 – 30 June 2022
- Appointed by: Leung Chun-ying; Carrie Lam

Commissioner, Independent Commission Against Corruption
- In office 31 October 2006 – 30 June 2007
- Preceded by: Raymond Wong
- Succeeded by: Timothy Tong

Permanent Secretary for Education and Manpower
- In office 1 July 2002 – 31 October 2006
- Succeeded by: Raymond Wong

Secretary for Education and Manpower
- In office 3 July 2000 – 30 June 2002
- Preceded by: Joseph Wong
- Succeeded by: Arthur Li

Personal details
- Born: Fan Chiu-fun; 24 February 1953 (age 73) Hong Kong
- Party: NPP
- Spouse: Law In-hong
- Relations: Henry Fan (brother)
- Education: University of Hong Kong (BSc); Chinese University of Hong Kong (MEd); Harvard Kennedy School (MPA)

Fanny Law Fan Chiu-fun
- Traditional Chinese: 羅范椒芬
- Simplified Chinese: 罗范椒芬
Transcriptions
Standard Mandarin
- Hanyu Pinyin: Luó Fàn Jiāofēn
Yue: Cantonese
- Yale Romanization: Lòh Faahn Jīufān
- Jyutping: Lo4 Faan6 Ziu1 Fan1

Fanny Law Fan Chiu-fun GBM GBS JP (Chinese: 羅范椒芬; née Fan; born 24 February 1953) is a former non-official member of the Executive Council of Hong Kong. She was awarded the Grand Bauhinia Medal (GBM) by the Hong Kong SAR Government in 2017.

Law held the posts of Secretary for Education and Manpower (until 2002), and Permanent Secretary for Education and Manpower (until 2006). In late 2006, she was appointed Commissioner, Independent Commission Against Corruption. She resigned from the post following a government inquiry into interference with academic freedom at the Hong Kong Institute of Education while she was Permanent Secretary. However the Court of First Instance held that Law did not violate the institute's right to academic freedom when she contacted academics directly. The judicial review was allowed on 13 March 2009 but this did not affect the commission's findings with regard to their terms of reference.

== Careers ==
Law joined the Hong Kong Government as an executive officer in September 1975. She transferred to the Administrative Service in October 1977. Between February 1991 and April 1994, she served as deputy secretary for the Civil Service. Between April and November 1994, she was deputy secretary for planning, environment and lands. In November 1994, she was promoted to senior assistant director and later deputy director, Housing Department. Law headed the chief executive's office from January to July 1997; and was made Commissioner for Transport in August 1997. She was made director of education in November 1998, and secretary for education and manpower in 2000. The post became permanent secretary in 2002, because of former chief executive Tung Chee Hwa's ministerial reforms. During the 2019 Hong Kong anti-extradition bill protests, National Public Radio reported, "Appearing on a local radio program, Fanny Law and Ip Kwok-him, who advise the Beijing-appointed government in Hong Kong, each offered qualified apologies for the bill. 'I'm willing [to say sorry] as I really thought at the time 99.9% of Hongkongers would not be affected by the bill,' Law said, according to The South China Morning Post."

=== Permanent Secretary for Education and Manpower ===
During her term of service, Law was responsible for large-scale reforms in education, Law was often criticized by educators who thought her ideas were out of touch with realities on the ground. Some of her public speeches also provoked controversies; teaching union representatives called for her resignation on several occasions.

In early January 2006, two teachers committed suicide, three other teachers' suicides in 2005 were blamed on job-related stress. Law rejected causal connections between the deaths by suicide of two teachers due to education reforms, saying: "If the prime reason [for the deaths] is education reforms, why have there been only two teachers who have committed suicide?" Her comments caused a furore among teachers and the public. She apologised on 10 January for her "inappropriate" remarks about the suicide of the two teachers. 7,500 – 15,000 teachers held a protest on 22 January against Law and the educational reforms. Raymond H.C. Wong was appointed to replace her.

=== Commissioner, ICAC ===
Law resigned from her post at 20 June 2007 after the HKIEd probe accused her of interfering with academic freedom. However, the Court of First Instance held that Law did not violate the institute's right to academic freedom. The judicial review was allowed to take place on 13 March 2009.

=== Tung Wah Group of Hospitals ===
In December 2008, the Tung Wah Group of Hospitals announced Law's appointment as chief executive. She declined the post in February 2009, after the government barred her from working in education-related work until 2011. There are fears over potential conflicts of interest: this decision was linked to the public consultation on post-service employment of civil servants following the row over Leung Chin-man's appointment to a local property developer.

Government offices
Preceded by Helen Yu	Director of Education; 1998–2000	Succeeded by Matthew Cheung
Political offices
Preceded by Joseph Wong	Secretary for Education and Manpower; 2000–2002	Succeeded by Arthur Li
Preceded by Joseph Wong	Secretary for Education and Manpower; 2000–2002	Succeeded by Stephen Ip as Secretary for Economic Development and Labour
Civic offices
Preceded by Raymond Wong	Commissioner, Independent Commission Against Corruption; 2006–2007	Succeeded by Timothy Tong
