= Raymond Wong (civil servant) =

Hong Kong government official (born 1957)

- Traditional Chinese: 黃鴻超
- Simplified Chinese: 黄鸿超
Transcriptions
Standard Mandarin
- Hanyu Pinyin: Huáng Hóngchaō
Yue: Cantonese
- Yale Romanization: Wong4 Hung4-Ciu1
- Jyutping: Wòhng Hùhng-chīu

Raymond Wong Hung Chiu GBS JP (born 29 July 1957), is the previous Permanent Secretary for the Civil Service Bureau of Hong Kong.

== Background ==
Wong was joined the Government in the Administrative Service in August 1980, served in various bureau and departments, including the Security Branch Commissioner for Narcotics from January to December 1996. In January 1997 to July as the Chief Secretary's Office Deputy Director of the Handover Ceremony Co-ordination Office, and in August 1997 to July 2001 as Deputy Secretary for Security. From July 2001 to August 2003 as Commissioner of Customs and Excise, and in July 2002 promoted to Administrative Officer Staff Grade. From August 2003 to October 2006 appointed as Commissioner, Independent Commission Against Corruption. After Fanny Law resigned as Permanent Secretary for Education of Hong Kong, he was appointed as her replacement on the same day. From 2010, Wong was appointed as Permanent Secretary for the Civil Service.

Civic offices
Preceded by John Tsang	Commissioner of Customs and Excise; 2001–2003	Succeeded by Timothy Tong
Preceded by Ambrose Lee	Commissioner, Independent Commission Against Corruption; 2003–2006	Succeeded by Fanny Law
Order of precedence
Preceded by Joshua Law; Permanent Secretary for Constitutional and Mainland Affairs	Hong Kong order of precedence Permanent Secretary for Civil Service	Succeeded by Andrew Wong; Permanent Secretary for the Commerce and Economic Development
