= Honours Diploma =

Honours Diploma (Chinese: 榮譽文憑) is an undergraduate qualification in Hong Kong, but is not officially recognized by the government and public universities. It was awarded by some post-secondary institutions, that were not with university status or officially facilitating quality assurance of all programmes at the levels of sub-degree and first degree.

== Qualification ==
The Hong Kong Government and the universities in Hong Kong does not recognize that an honours diploma was equivalent to a bachelor's degree. As a result, holders of an honorary diploma could not directly apply for a master's program at universities in Hong Kong, and a bachelor's degree would even have to be re-studied for two years.

The post-secondary colleges that awarded honorary diplomas in Hong Kong at that time were:

- Hong Kong Shue Yan College
- Hong Kong Baptist College
- Lingnan College

The above three colleges later passed the accreditation of the Hong Kong Council for Accreditation of Academic and Vocational Qualifications and successively obtained university status, so they are awarding bachelor's degrees rather than honours diplomas.

== See also ==
- Higher education accreditation
- Academic certificate
