= Independent Commission Against Corruption (Hong Kong) =

Anti-corruption body of Hong Kong

- Logo
- Abbreviation: ICAC

Agency overview
- Formed: 15 February 1974; 52 years ago
- Employees: 1,213 (June 2007)
- Annual budget: HK$1,074,200,000 (2017–2018)

Jurisdictional structure
- Legal jurisdiction: Hong Kong
- Constituting instruments: Basic Law of Hong Kong; Independent Commission Against Corruption Ordinance (Cap. 204)
- Specialist jurisdiction: Anti-corruption

Operational structure
- Headquarters: ICAC Building, 303 Java Road, North Point, Hong Kong
- Elected officer responsible: John Lee, Chief Executive of Hong Kong
- Agency executives: Woo Ying-ming, Commissioner; Ricky Yau, Deputy Commissioner

Website
- www.icac.org.hk

Independent Commission Against Corruption
- Chinese: 廉政公署
Transcriptions
Standard Mandarin
- Hanyu Pinyin: Liánzhèng Gōngshǔ
Yue: Cantonese
- Yale Romanization: Lìhm jing gūng chyúh
- Jyutping: Lim^{4} zing^{3} gung^{1} cyu^{5}

Pre-handover Name
- Traditional Chinese: 總督特派廉政專員公署
Transcriptions
Yue: Cantonese
- Yale Romanization: Júng dūk dahk paai lìhm jing jyūn yùhn gūng chyúh
- Jyutping: Zung^{2} duk^{1} dak^{6} paai^{3} lim^{4} zing^{3} zyun^{1} jyun^{4} gung^{1} cyu^{5}

The Independent Commission Against Corruption (ICAC; Chinese: 廉政公署) is the statutory independent anti-corruption body of Hong Kong with the primary objective of combating corruption in both the public and private sectors. Established in 1974 and operating independently from the Hong Kong government and law enforcement agencies, the ICAC is headed by the Commissioner, who reports directly to the Chief Executive of Hong Kong. The ICAC has played a crucial role in maintaining Hong Kong's reputation as one of the least corrupt places globally and fostering a culture of integrity within the city.

The ICAC's functions encompass investigation, prevention, and education. It investigates complaints of corruption-related offenses, conducts operations to uncover corrupt practices, and has the authority to arrest, search, and seize property. In addition, the ICAC works on preventing corruption by reviewing and improving systems and procedures in government departments, public bodies, and private organizations, while also offering advice and assistance in implementing effective anti-corruption measures. The ICAC also engages in public education and awareness campaigns to raise ethical standards in the community and encourage the public to report corruption.

The Article 57 of the Basic Law of Hong Kong stipulates that the ICAC shall operate independently and be directly accountable to the Chief Executive of Hong Kong. By the Article 48, the Commissioner of the ICAC, being as a principal official of Hong Kong, is nominated by the Chief Executive of Hong Kong and appointed by the State Council of the People's Republic of China.

== Background ==
As Hong Kong recovered after World War II, the population began to swell and manufacturing industries grew. By the 1960s Hong Kong was experiencing economic growth, yet the government kept civil servants' salaries very low. Officials in all departments took advantage of their positions to supplement their wages with demands for "tea money," "lucky money," or substantially larger sums. Examples of corruption ranged from nursing sisters demanding money to provide services such as extra blankets, food or to allow visitors outside normal hours; firemen lived by the saying, "冇錢，冇水" ("No money, no water") and sometimes asked for money to turn off the water, preventing water damage, once a fire had been put out; officials in Lands and Public Works departments secured huge sums of money for "advice" and "signatures" that procured the award of tenders and enabled developments and projects to proceed; the Royal Hong Kong Police organised entire stations to "make money" from hawkers, licences, and in many other illicit schemes. Civil servants often had to pay for promotions and postings in positions known for a lucrative return.

The Hong Kong Police Force previously had an Anti-Corruption Branch, but it did little to reduce corruption in February 1952. Public perception was that Anti-Corruption police, following the discovery of corrupt practices, would then enter into the dealings themselves. One example was Peter Godber, a senior officer stationed at Wan Chai Police Station and later at Kai Tak Airport police station. Before his retirement in 1973, he had amassed at least 4.3 million Hong Kong dollars (approximately 600,000 US dollars) in overseas bank accounts. The police's Anti-Corruption Branch investigated his wealth and ordered him to explain his source of income. In response, Godber immediately arranged for his wife to leave the colony, then used his police airport pass to bypass Immigration and Passport checks and walked onto a plane for London. Godber's escape led to a large public outcry over the integrity and quality of the police's self-investigation and called for reforms in the government's anti-corruption efforts. Godber was later extradited back to Hong Kong to face trial and was convicted.

In 1960s, Ernest Thornton, a British Labour Party politician and Member of Parliament, had suggested the appointment of an independent body by the UK government to investigate corruption issues in Hong Kong. The suggestion was denied however. ICAC was eventually established on 15 February 1974, after a study team of Hong Kong civil servants was sent to Singapore and Sri Lanka in 1968 to study their anti corruption laws and Godber's escape in 1973.

The newly formed Independent Commission Against Corruption would be answerable to only the Governor of Hong Kong, unlike the old police Anti-Corruption Branch. Most ICAC operations staff were sergeants recruited from specifically British police forces and were certainly not beyond sharp practices themselves. Their tactics and methods were often aggressive—they would go to a police station and take an entire shift in for questioning as a "fishing exercise." Ultimately their shock tactics were effective.

== Development ==
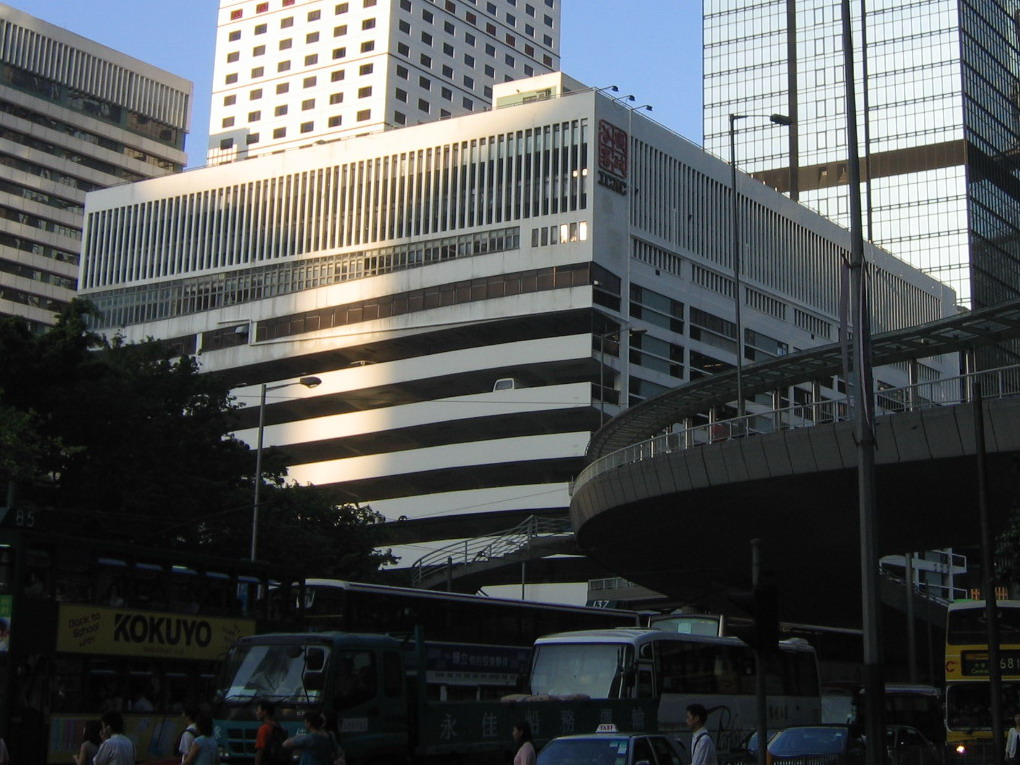
ICAC former office in the top floors of the Murray Road Multi-storey Car Park Building, Admiralty, used from 1978 until 2007

In the early days there were running punch-ups between ICAC officers and angry policemen who stormed their offices in Central District; this situation ended only with the announcement of a partial amnesty for minor corruptions committed before 1977. But gradually, the ICAC made itself felt and several high-profile police officers were tried and convicted. Others were forced to retire. As a result of its investigations, a mass purge took place in early 1978, where it was announced that 119 officers including one customs official were asked to leave under the provisions of Colonial Regulation 55 (see footnote 1 below) to fast track the decisions in the public interest; a further 24 officers were held on conspiracy charges, and 36 officers and a customs official were given amnesties. The move received a mixed response from the public whilst being broadly supported by legislative councillors as being in the best interests of Hong Kong not to let the affair fester and further demoralise the police Force. Urban Council member Elsie Elliot criticised the government for being lenient to senior corrupt officials, punishing only "small flies."

Gradually, Hong Kong transformed from a graft-ridden city into one of the least corrupt places in the world, as recognised by international institutions such as the World Bank, The Heritage Foundation and Transparency International. Some countries have looked to the ICAC as an effective model of combating graft holistically through detection, prevention, and education.

In the 1970s, eight out of 10 graft complaints were against public officers. This trend has reversed over the years. Complaints against police officers reduced by 70 percent—from 1,443 in 1974 to 446 in 2007. Nowadays, only three out of 10 complaints relate to public servants. Private sector cases meanwhile have been on the rise in recent years. The ICAC has stepped up efforts to help enterprises minimise corruption risks through system controls and staff training. (The statistics are provided by the ICAC.)

In the late 1980s, the Acting Crown Prosecutor, Charles Warwick Reid, was arrested for taking bribes to throw trials. He was subsequently convicted. He did not take up his post as Director of New Zealand's new Serious Fraud Office. His eight-year sentence was reduced to six years when he turned informer. He spent his time in witness protection, the first three years in solitary confinement, and on his release was returned to his native New Zealand. Within a couple of days he had made a false affidavit for a Chinese businessman standing trial in Hong Kong. The Hong Kong authorities wanted him extradited, but he was instead tried in New Zealand and sentenced to two years. He, his wife and his solicitor became the defendants in a landmark Privy Council case on tracing bribe money in 1993, when the Attorney-General of Hong Kong sought to obtain unpaid fines of $12,000,000 by claims on land Reid bought in the New Zealand seaside town of Tauranga.

In 2008, corruption reports received by the ICAC dropped six per cent to 3,377, of which 65 per cent were related to the private sector, 28 per cent concerned government departments, and the remaining seven per cent were against public bodies.

Research on corruption—carried out by the Anti Corruption Resource Centre—shows that police corruption in Hong Kong was frequently associated with "illegal markets" or "victimless crimes" such as gambling, prostitution and drugs. Thus, the decision to legalise off-course betting in Hong Kong—a previously rich source of police bribes—may plausibly have contributed to the fall in police corruption. The investigative, preventive, and educational activities of the ICAC no doubt also had some impact but were not solely or even largely responsible for reducing police corruption.

== Controversies ==
After the big purges of the 1970s, many thought that the ICAC would take a reduced role in society, but despite the fact that their main job was done their influence remained pervasive. Short of voluminous numbers of dramatic cases many ICAC officers left Hong Kong, others remained to enjoy a less taxing life. However, in 1993 senior assistant director of Operations Alex Tsui Ka-kit was suddenly sacked by Commissioner Bertrand de Speville. The "Alex Tsui Affair" caused a huge stir in the mid-1990s as Tsui did not go quietly. Indeed, he made counter-allegations of misconduct within the ICAC, one of which was that Director of Operations Jim Buckle had "squashed" an investigation into allegations of sexual harassment by an officer called Michael Croft (who was later transferred and forced out of the service). Alex Tsui's continued rantings in the media and Legislative Council did little for the image of ICAC.

A year later at Christmas 1995, an ICAC assistant director—a well-known carouser—was arrested for drinking and driving. Following conviction he mysteriously avoided strong punishment and received only a "reprimand" from the Commissioner of the ICAC.

On 31 October 2006, Fanny Law was appointed Commissioner of the ICAC. The unpopular Permanent Secretary for Education and Manpower was seen as being weak on security-related issues. In addition, as Law's and former Commissioner Raymond Wong's appointments were a direct swap, the government was derided by the Civic Party and Liberal Party for belittling an important position by playing "musical chairs." Law was not perceived to be at the end of her civil service career, while the post of Commissioner was traditionally a 'final' posting, allowing the official to work without fear or favour.

=== Expenses scandal ===
In 2013, Timothy Tong was found to have overspent on entertaining and gifts for mainland and other overseas officials during his 5-year tenure as Commissioner. An independent committee found that he had authorised entertaining expenses at banquets that exceeded internal guidelines. There was an example of an airline upgrade for two officers to business class costing HK$186,000 that had no record of approval, and one gift costing HK$4,140 ($530) that had been reportedly offered to a senior mainland official. Tong was criticised by a Legislative Council committee for his 35 work trips which cost taxpayers almost HK$4 million ($513,000) and gifts to both mainland and overseas officials costing HK$282,000 ($36,100). The LegCo committee expressed its concern as to "whether Mr Tong had thoroughly considered that unduly close contacts between him and mainland officials in Hong Kong during his tenure might have shaken public confidence in the impartiality of the ICAC." Tong had recently been appointed delegate to the Chinese People's Political Consultative Conference when the scandal broke. Chief Secretary Carrie Lam admitted that the controversy surrounding the over-expenditures "inevitably undermined the ICAC's image and Hong Kong's reputation as a corruption-free society."

=== Concerns over independence ===
Several high-level appointments since the transfer of sovereignty have brought the independence of the ICAC into question. Simon Peh, an Immigration Department bureaucrat, was appointed Commissioner in 2012. More importantly, in 2014, Maria Tam, former colonial loyalist who rapidly switched allegiance to Beijing after 1997, was named head of the Operations Review Committee – a key board that has power to question any decision of the ICAC and to drop any case.

Further erosion of independence was feared when Rebecca Li Bo-lan – a 30-year veteran graft-buster and the first female head of the ICAC investigative unit, appointed in June 2015 – was abruptly removed from her job in an unprecedented manner, and no explanation has been forthcoming from the ICAC. Pan-democratic politicians accused chief executive CY Leung of interfering because he is the subject of an anti-graft probe over a HK$50 million payment Leung received from Australian firm UGL. Democratic-camp legislators made allegations, citing internal ICAC sources, that Leung's office had been uncooperative and also impeding the progress of investigations into his own case; the Chief Executive's Office rebutted the claim.

== Impact ==
For the private sector, the establishment of ICAC reorganised the corruption morale of the private sector which they started to alter the importance of integrity. ICAC also offered a channel for people to report on the corruption cases which led to an upsurge in corruption reports. The situation in the banking sector was the most significant and affected many banking officers. It also revealed that the issue of corruption was deeply-rooted in this sector, even in some major banks. The corruption problems were kept in silence and being ignored. Besides, after the report of corruption cases, the management team in the sector started to internalise and execute rules and policies in combating the corruption which turned the prevention into internal issues. This led to a decrease in reporting corruption cases afterwards.

=== Activity and Operations ===
On 10 March 2026, the Securities and Futures Commission and ICAC raided Guotai Junan International's office with search warrants, seized certain documents and detained an employee.

== Constitutionality ==
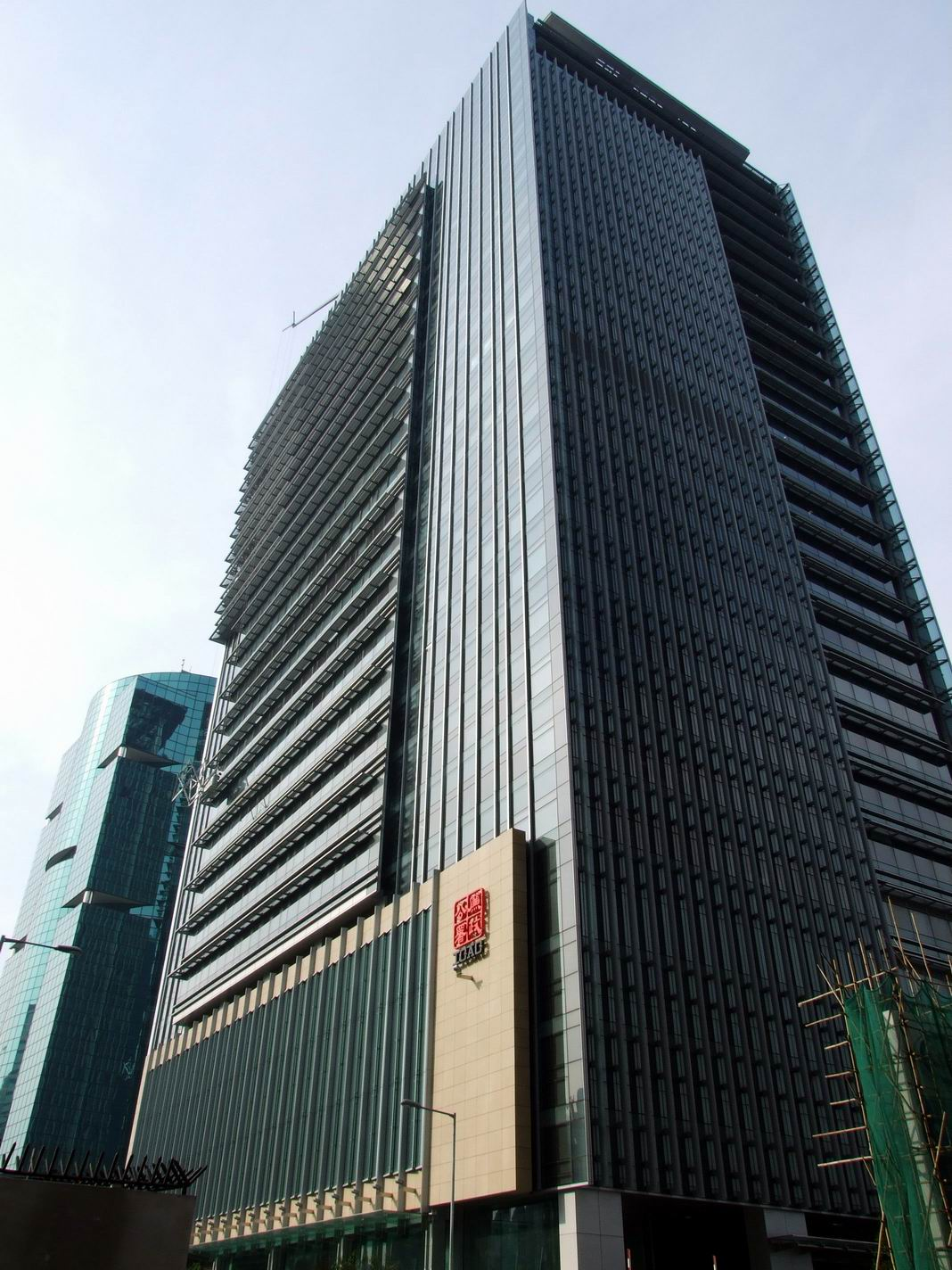
ICAC Building in North Point

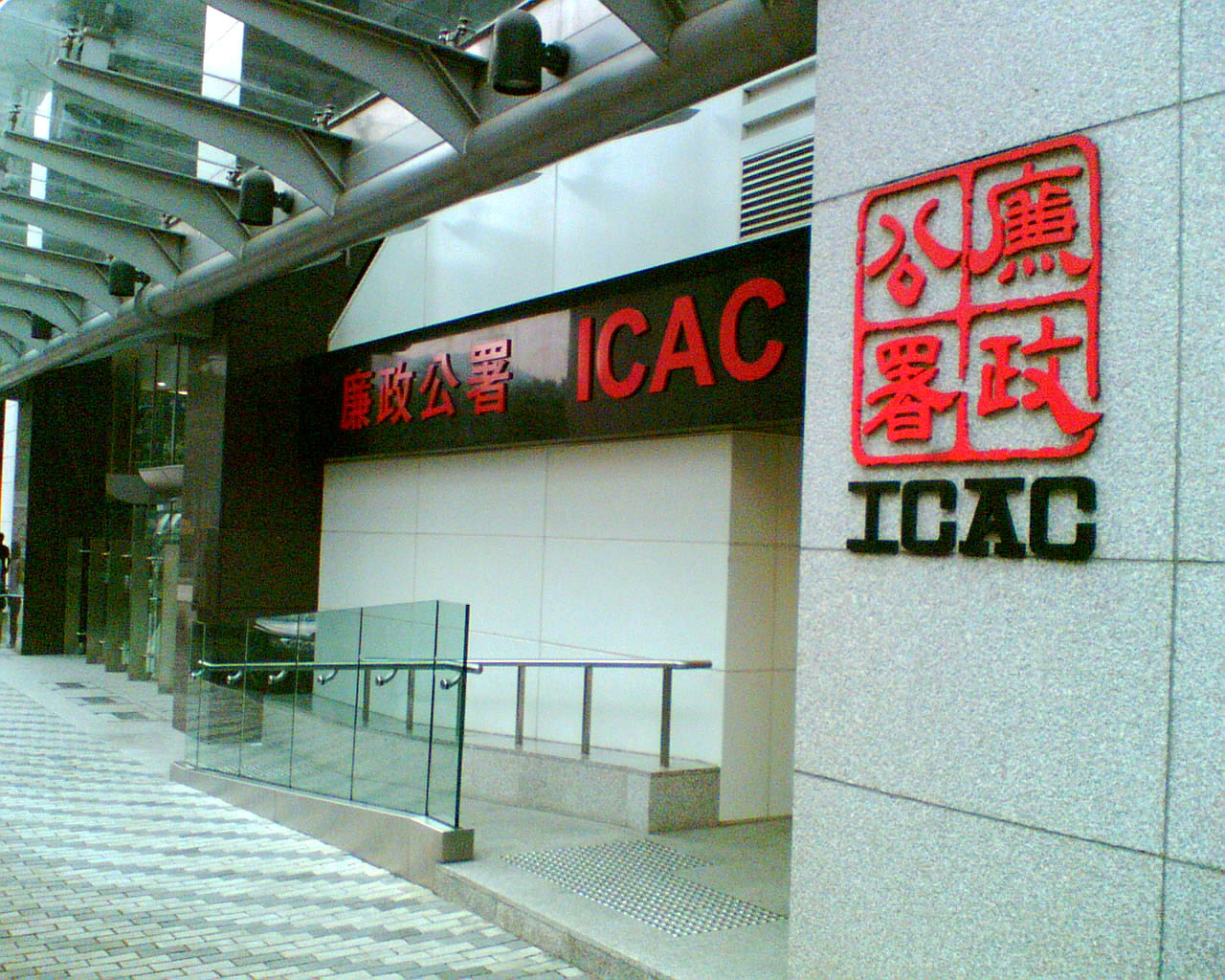
ICAC Sha Tin

In preparation for transfer of Hong Kong's sovereignty in 1997, the National People's Congress of the People's Republic of China enacted the Hong Kong Basic Law in 1990, providing for the establishment of a "Commission Against Corruption." This anti-graft agency thus exists as a constitutionally sanctioned body.

== Covert surveillance ==
In 2005, the evidence collected by the ICAC through covert surveillance in a case involving a publicly listed company was questioned. While the judge ruled that covert surveillance carried out in this case was unconstitutional due to the absence of relevant legal procedures, the judge admitted the evidence as he found that the ICAC had conducted the operations in good faith. The defendants were convicted.

To address the lack of legal procedures that govern covert surveillance by law enforcement agencies, as required by the Basic Law, the Legislative Council passed the Interception of Communication and Surveillance Ordinance (ICSO) in August 2006 to provide for such procedures. All covert surveillance operations of the ICAC are now carried out strictly in accordance with the ICSO, which applies to all law enforcement agencies in Hong Kong.

An assistant ICAC investigator was jailed for nine months on 4 April 2003 for lying in a court trial, to conceal the fact that he had threatened a suspect to co-operate with a probe by ICAC. So far, this is the only case of such a nature in ICAC history.

== Organisation ==
The independence of the organisation is assured by its three pillars – Head of Operations, the Commissioner and Operations Review Committee (ORC). The Operations Department is accountable not to the Commissioner, but the ORC comprising largely members of the public appointed by the Chief Executive.

=== Commissioner ===
The Commissioner is the public face of the ICAC, and is mainly responsible for policy, public image and international relations. Although generally considered the top official in the organisation, the Commissioner generally has little knowledge of specific investigations until their final stages, adhering to the ICAC's "need-to- know" principle, which has acted as a de facto separation of functions since it was founded in the 1970s.

The current Commissioner, the 15th, is Simon Peh. He was appointed in 2012 and is the body's longest-serving head to date.

=== Divisions ===
The ICAC has three divisions: Operations, Community Relations, and Corruption Prevention. The Operations Department is the largest by far, having 72 percent of the staff, and is responsible for all the high-profile busts. The person in charge of the Operations Department is appointed by the Chief Executive and not by the ICAC Commissioner. By custom and practice, the Head of Operations is usually bestowed the title of Deputy Commissioner. Currently headed by Ricky Yau Shu-chun, this department considers itself all powerful, and has apparently resisted all attempts to interfere with its investigations. The investigation into circulation fraud by Sally Aw at The Standard has been cited as an example of the embarrassment caused by such non-co-operation with the government hierarchy.

=== Witness Protection and Firearms Section ===
ICAC maintains a small specialised unit, namely the Witness Protection and Firearms Section (R4), which carry out high risk operations (such as pursuits and conducting house raids), forced entry, witness protection, and training of new recruits in basic firearms skills since April 1998.

To be the member of R4, investigators have to undergo a battery of physical, written, and psychometric tests, and receive a three-phase training if they are selected, which involves multiple tactics in witness protection, firearms and more.

Up to now, no shots were fired by R4 during missions.

== Colonial Regulation 55 ==
Colonial Regulation 55 was an executive provision of the highest order for which the colonial Government was not obliged to give cause. It stipulated that "An officer holds office subject to the pleasure of the Crown, and the pleasure of the Crown that he may no longer hold it may be signified through the Secretary of State, in which case no special formalities are required."

As a safeguard for this regulation, action must be taken by the Secretary of State for Foreign and Commonwealth Affairs in London after review by the Secretary of the Civil Service and the Attorney General for England and Wales. The highest authority would have been the Lord Chancellor.

This regulation was invoked approximately 25 times by the colonial Government up to 1978, twice of which was during the tenure of Governor MacLehose.

Henry Litton, Chairman of the Hong Kong Bar Association, questioned the use of Regulation 55, when Regulations 56 and 57 (which provide for "dismissal after due enquiry" before a judge) could have been used. He furthermore said "As far as I know, Colonial Regulations apply to only sovereign gazetted officers," and that "no Chinese policeman has ever been given a copy...before signing on." Most Legislators supported the move as being under "exceptional circumstances" and "necessary."

The Colonial Regulation was replaced by the Public Service Order after Hong Kong's transfer of sovereignty to China in 1997.

== Information technology ==
ICAC commissioner Dr Timothy Tong Hin-ming mentioned in a report tabled in the Legislative Council the strategic importance of information technology (IT) in operations as corruption cases have become increasingly complex. The commission has stepped up staff training in financial investigation and computer forensics skills, and enhanced investigative resources especially in regard to corruption in the private sector.

In 2008, the commission organised a series of seminars to enhance the investigators' knowledge on the global and local financial system and its regulatory mechanism.

ICAC's financial investigation section probed into 7,095 financial transactions in 168 cases, involving an aggregated sum of HK$4.4 billion (US$567 million) in 2008. The commission's computer forensics section carried out 502 computer data analysis projects relating to 111 operations in which 368 computers were seized.

== Weapons ==
Name	Country of origin	Type	Notes
Smith & Wesson Model 10	United States	Revolver	Used since inception until 2005
Smith & Wesson Model 13	United States	Revolver	Used since inception until 2005
Colt Detective Special	United States	Revolver	Used since inception until 2005
Browning Hi-Power	Belgium	Semi-automatic pistol	Formerly issued
Glock 17	Austria	Semi-automatic pistol	Standard issue
Glock 19	Austria	Semi-automatic pistol	Standard issue
SIG Sauer P228	United States	Semi-automatic pistol	Currently issued

== Strategy ==
The ICAC uses a three-pronged approach to combating corruption: investigation, prevention, and community education. The most high profile of aspect of its work has been its investigative work, however as important if not more so has been its work in prevention and education. Prevention wise the ICAC offers advice and practical help to enable companies and organisations to introduce systems and procedures that are resistant to corruption. Since its inception the ICAC has worked tirelessly to change the public's perception that bribes and kickbacks are an expected and normal part of everyday life, and to reassure citizens that if they face a demand for an illegal payment that the ICAC will be there to investigate.

== In popular culture ==
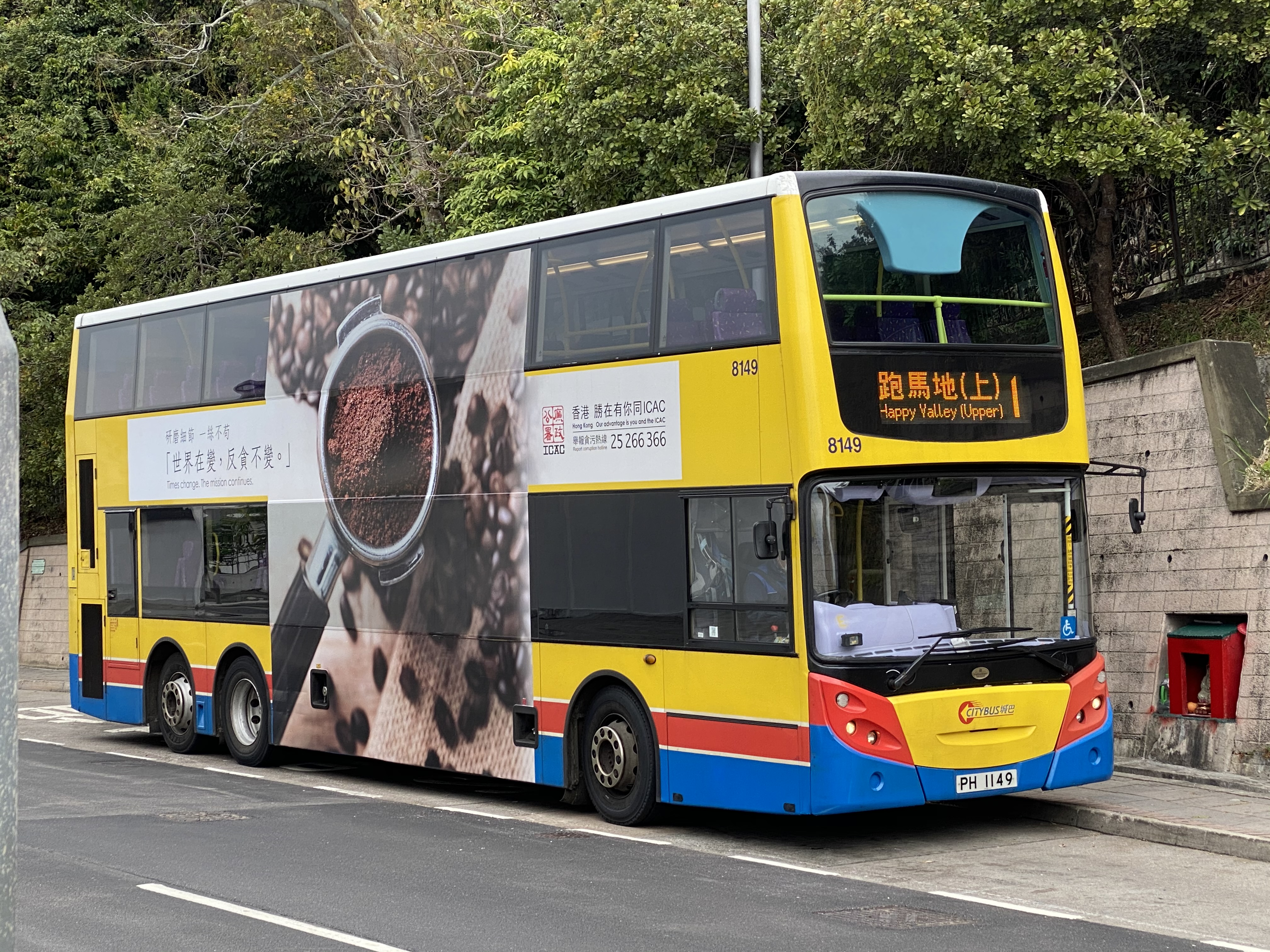
Bus advertisement showing coffee beans and ICAC's slogan: Hong Kong Our advantage is you and the ICAC.

In Hong Kong Cantonese, "to be invited to have coffee" is a metaphor for being brought to ICAC for questioning due to the practice of offering a cup of coffee to the investigation subject so that the person can concentrate during interrogation.

There have been several movies about the ICAC; The First Shot in 1993 and I Corrupt All Cops in 2009 that tell the history of the ICAC from the inception to how it adopted its interrogation methods. A number of television series have also been made about the commission with the ICAC Investigators family of miniseries being based on actual ICAC cases and made with the full co-operation of the ICAC as part of its community education work. Furthermore, the Storm series centred itself on the ICAC as a powerful propaganda tool to gain public support for the Chinese anti-corruption organ.

== Notable cases ==
Near the end of 2024 and afterwards, residents from Wang Fuk Court filed complaints with ICAC against contractors and consultants with their apartments' renovation project. ICAC declined to investigate, and a year later at the end of 2025, more than 100 people were killed in the Wang Fuk Court fire.

== See also ==
- 26 blocks scandal
