= World Trade Organization Ministerial Conference of 2005 =

2005 WTO Ministerial Conference held in Hong Kong

Sixth Ministerial Conference of the World Trade Organization

- Conference Co-ordination Office Head Janet Wong unveils the logo for the meeting, which incorporates the WTO's familiar six strokes, surrounding them with golden rays to form an image that looks like the number '6'
- Country: Hong Kong Convention and Exhibition Centre, Wan Chai, Hong Kong
- Previous event: Fifth Ministerial Conference of the World Trade Organization
- Next event: Seventh Ministerial Conference of the World Trade Organization
- Participants: 148 member countries
- Sponsor: Hong Kong SAR
- Number of NGOs (12) / Number of protesters (10,000)

The Sixth Ministerial Conference of the World Trade Organization, also known as the WTO Hong Kong Ministerial Conference and abbreviated as MC6, was held at the Hong Kong Convention and Exhibition Centre, Wan Chai, Hong Kong from 13 to 18 December 2005. Representatives from 148 countries were expected to attend the event, as well as over 10,000 protesters led by the Hong Kong People’s Alliance on WTO and made up of largely South Korean farmers. The conference approved a declaration which many participants described as marking "significant progress". However, due to violent protesters, police officers were deployed with batons, riot gas, and other non-lethal weapons. Around 910 people were arrested. Of these, 14 were charged, but none were convicted.

== Background ==
The Ministerial Conference is the highest decision-making body in the World Trade Organization (WTO), meeting at least once every two years and providing political direction for the organization. The Hong Kong Ministerial Conference of the World Trade Organization, which was held from 13 to 18 December 2005, is the sixth ministerial conference (MC6) of the WTO. The 150 WTO member economies aimed to reach a preliminary agreement on liberalization of farm trade by reducing subsidies, providing Aid for Trade and address other issues at the Hong Kong meeting, aiming for a successful conclusion of the Doha Round in 2006.

=== Doha Development Agenda ===
The declaration of the "MC4 in Doha", named for the Qatari capital (Doha) has provided the mandate for negotiations on a number of issues on agriculture, concerning the implementation of the agreements which had to be completed in 2000 originally. However, the declaration set 1 January 2005 as the deadline for completing all but two of the agreements.

The Doha round aims to cut trade barriers across a wide range of sectors and is supposed to address the needs of developing countries, for whom agriculture is a particularly sensitive topic. Developing countries say farm trade needs to be tackled first because it is so important to their economies and because it is heavily protected in many rich countries. The 25-nation European Union, in particular, has been under fire for not making further cuts to its farm tariffs and subsidies. A series of meetings between ministers has failed to break the deadlock. The EU says equal attention needs to be paid to manufactured goods, which far outweigh agriculture's importance in global trade.

At the 2003 Ministerial Conference, it was expected all members would reach consensus on how to complete the remaining agreements. However, the meeting got stuck because of discord created by agricultural issues and ended in deadlock on the "Singapore issues". The original 1 January 2005 deadline was missed. After that, members aimed at finishing the negotiations by the end of 2006.

The shelved Doha development agenda was therefore carried over to the Hong Kong conference. That is why speculation on the chances of success of the MC6 had been rife in the months leading up to the conference in Hong Kong.

=== Agenda ===
- Market access: supporters of a new round demanded sharp reductions in tariffs on goods.
- Domestic support: demands for end of direct payments to farmers to produce their goods.
- Export subsidies: European Union has promised to end its subsidies that depress international prices. However, no exact date has been provided so far.
- Services: push for lifting of restrictions on services sector.
- Singapore issues: demands from some rich nations for more transparent laws and better legal protection for trading companies. They include issues in investment, competition, government procurement, and trade facilitation.

=== Principles of the negotiations ===
- Single undertaking: Every item of the negotiation is part of a whole and indivisible package and cannot be agreed separately. In other words, Nothing is agreed until everything is agreed.
- Participation: The negotiations are open to all WTO members and to observer governments negotiating or intending to negotiate membership. But decisions on the outcomes are only taken by members.
- Transparency: The negotiations have to be transparent.
- Special and differential treatment: The negotiations have to take fully into account the principle of special and differential treatment for developing and least-developed countries.
- Sustainable development: The Trade and Development and Trade Environment identify and debate developmental and environmental aspects of the negotiations to ensure that sustainable development is appropriately reflected.
- Subjects not negotiated: Elements of the work programme which do not involve negotiations are also accorded a high priority. The General Council reported on their progress to the Fifth Ministerial Conference in 2003.

=== The potential benefits of the success of the MC6 ===
The WTO attempted to facilitate dialogue between developing and developed countries. It is a platform that member states from all over the world can gather to discuss issues that influence global trade and economic development such as General Agreement on Tariffs and Trade, agricultural subsidies and equal access to technology.

The WTO has stated that it seeks to assist developing countries enhance their rural-based economies. It has been suggested that advanced technology could be provided by other countries. Developing countries are seeking easier access to foreign markets, especially those in the EU and North America. Moreover, they are seeking a larger quota of export and free tax for their products. In order to protect the interests of developing countries and recognise their needs, the term 'consider positively' may be extended to seven years as to eliminate any measures that are inconsistent with the overall goals of the WTO. Should these efforts have succeeded, the MC6 would have made substantial progress towards fulfilling its mandate.

=== The barriers faced by the MC6 ===
Many groups of people are not happy with the WTO as they believe it symbolizes the exploitation of poor countries by the developed countries. Thus, there are many protests and demonstrations organised during each WTO conference. Besides, as the number of member countries in WTO is large, it is not easy to reach an agreement which gets the consensus of the participating countries. Therefore, the last two Ministerial Conferences which included the Ministerial meetings at Seattle and Cancún failed. It was not easy to tell if the MC6 could reach any final agreement.

=== Participations of the member countries ===
==== Commonwealth of Nations ====
The Commonwealth of Nations is an association of 53 countries. Its 1.8 billion citizens, about 30 per cent of the world's population are drawn from a broad range of faiths, races, cultures and traditions.

In the recent Commonwealth Heads of Government Meeting in Malta, on 25–27 November 2005, the group issued its Valletta Statement on Multilateral Trade calling on "all developed countries to demonstrate the political courage and will to give more than they receive."

The Commonwealth has also acknowledged that "Agriculture is the most distorted sector of world trade" and has put renewed pressure on the European Union to commit to a time-table to reduce agricultural subsidies.

==== Africa ====
The main concern of Africa in the Hong Kong Ministerial Conference of the World Trade Organization was to have the right of entry to the Northern markets for tropical products, and to defend African markets from profoundly subsidised exports dumped onto their market. On conjugal support, the proposal is for rich countries to cut down their support to home farmers and to slowly but surely phase it out. Africa was requesting cuts in subsidies for produces that are sent abroad and dumped onto African markets.

== Pre-conference predictions ==
John Tsang, then Secretary for Commerce, Industry and Technology of Hong Kong, makes his speech in a pre-conference media workshop

Although WTO members are eager to reach a deal in MC6, a 42-page draft unveiled by WTO Director-General Pascal Lamy show how far they are agreeing on critical issues.

The draft does reflect some progress made over 18 months on new anti-dumping rules and customs facilities improvement. However, the two subjects, reducing tariffs and subsidies on either agriculture or manufactured goods, have held up the negotiations.

Trade officials said unless progress has been made in negotiations in these two subjects, meaningful deal can hardly be reached in MC6.

In an interview with a Hong Kong's local newspaper, the South China Morning Post, France's trade minister, Christine Lagarde, anticipated that there would no consensus and no major progress in Hong Kong.

== Planning ==
A steering committee, chaired by the Permanent Secretary for Commerce, Industry and Technology (Commerce and Industry) of the Hong Kong Special Administrative Region (HKSAR), Denise Yue, was set up in August 2004.

Seven working groups under the committee were established. Their tasks covered the following areas:

- accommodation
- conference facilities
- transport and airport reception
- security and accreditation
- media, publicity and community relations
- social programmes, commercial sponsorship and liaison support
- information and communications technology

to ensure the success of the event.

=== Venue ===
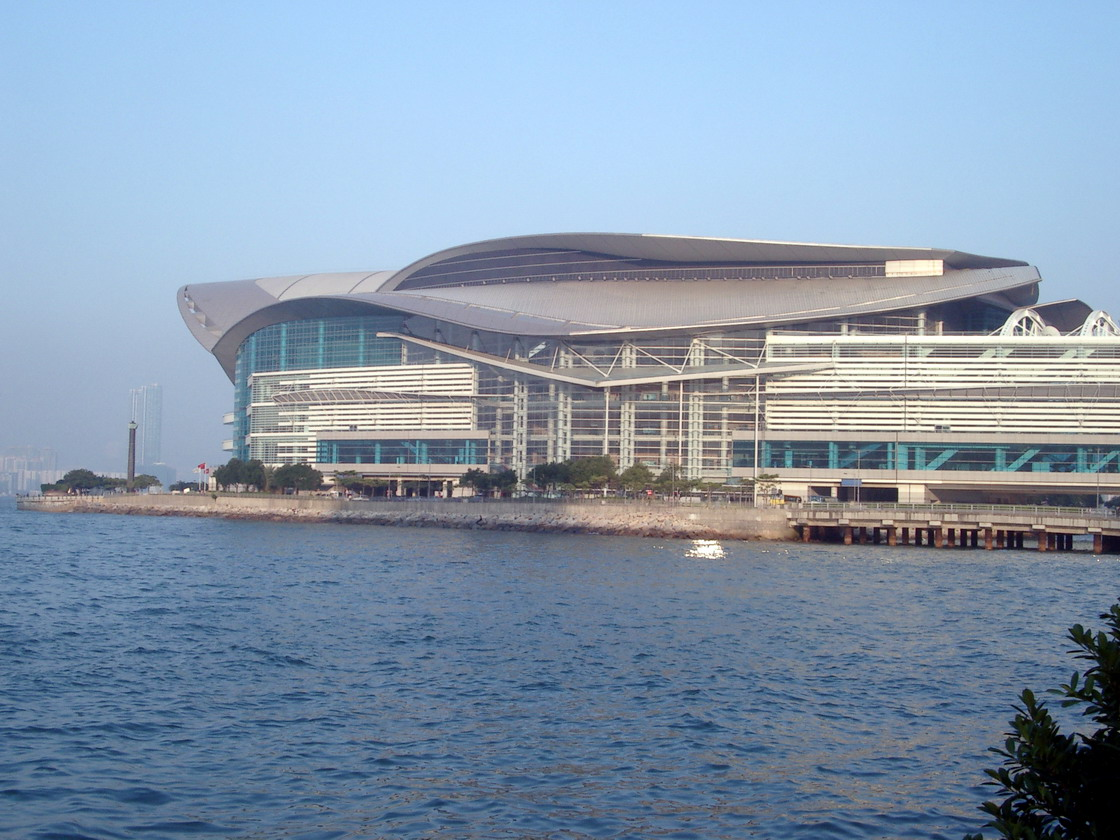
The new wing of the Hong Kong Convention and Exhibition Centre in Wan Chai North was the main venue for the Conference.

During the MC6, a closed area covering the Hong Kong Convention and Exhibition Centre and its linking footbridges, Tamar site, Wan Chai ferry pier, Convention Drive, Expo Drive and the podium adjacent to Grand Hyatt Hotel was set up. In terms of geographic coverage, the closed area was about one square kilometre. The closure was on a 24-hour-a-day basis from 6pm on 12 December to 5 a.m. on 19 December 2005.

An executive order was made by the Chief Executive under section 36 of the Public Order Ordinance (POO) (Cap. 245) to turn these places into a closed area. Under the order, the Commissioner of Police may grant permission to individuals to enter or leave the closed area. Holders of accreditation badges, including MC6 delegates, local and overseas journalists, representatives of non-governmental organisations, support staff, staff and tenants of the Hong Kong Convention and Exhibition Centre were allowed to enter or leave the closed area during the closure period. Other people who needed to enter the closed area for justifiable reasons applied for permits from the police.

=== Security and emergency ===
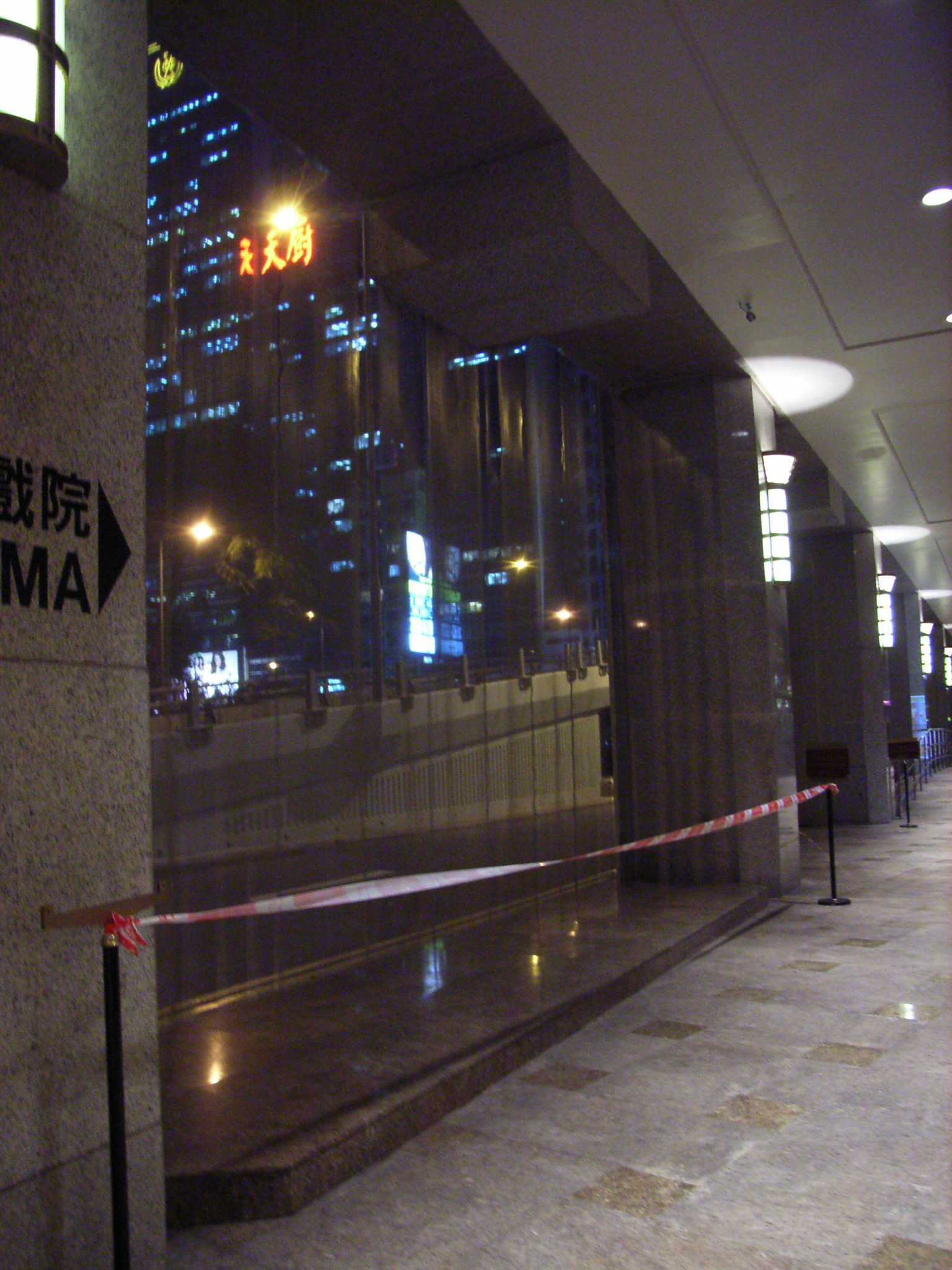
Sun Hung Kai Centre(next to the Wan Chai Sports Ground protest zone), protected by wire nettings.

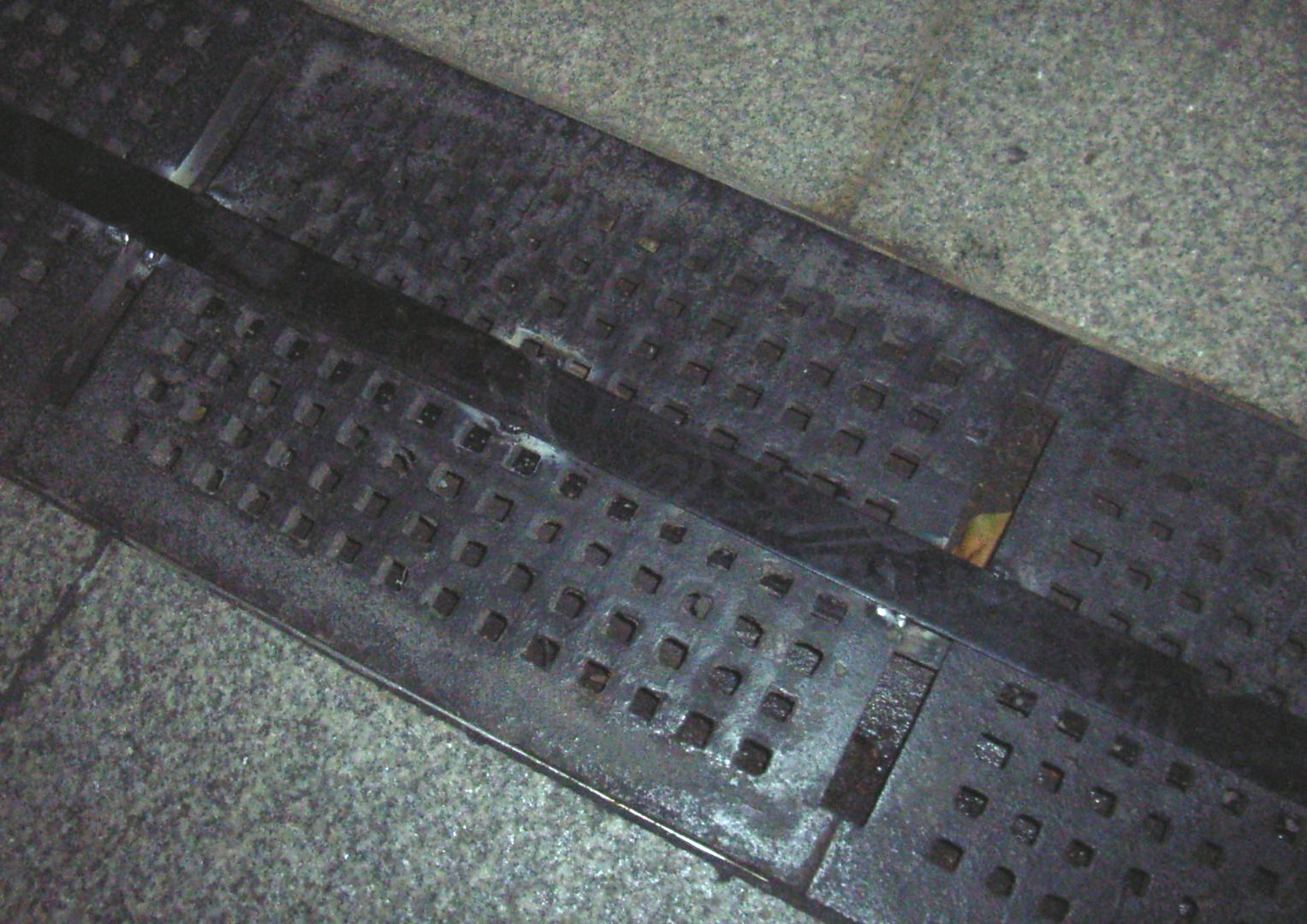
Drain covers outside Wanchai Tower have been secured.

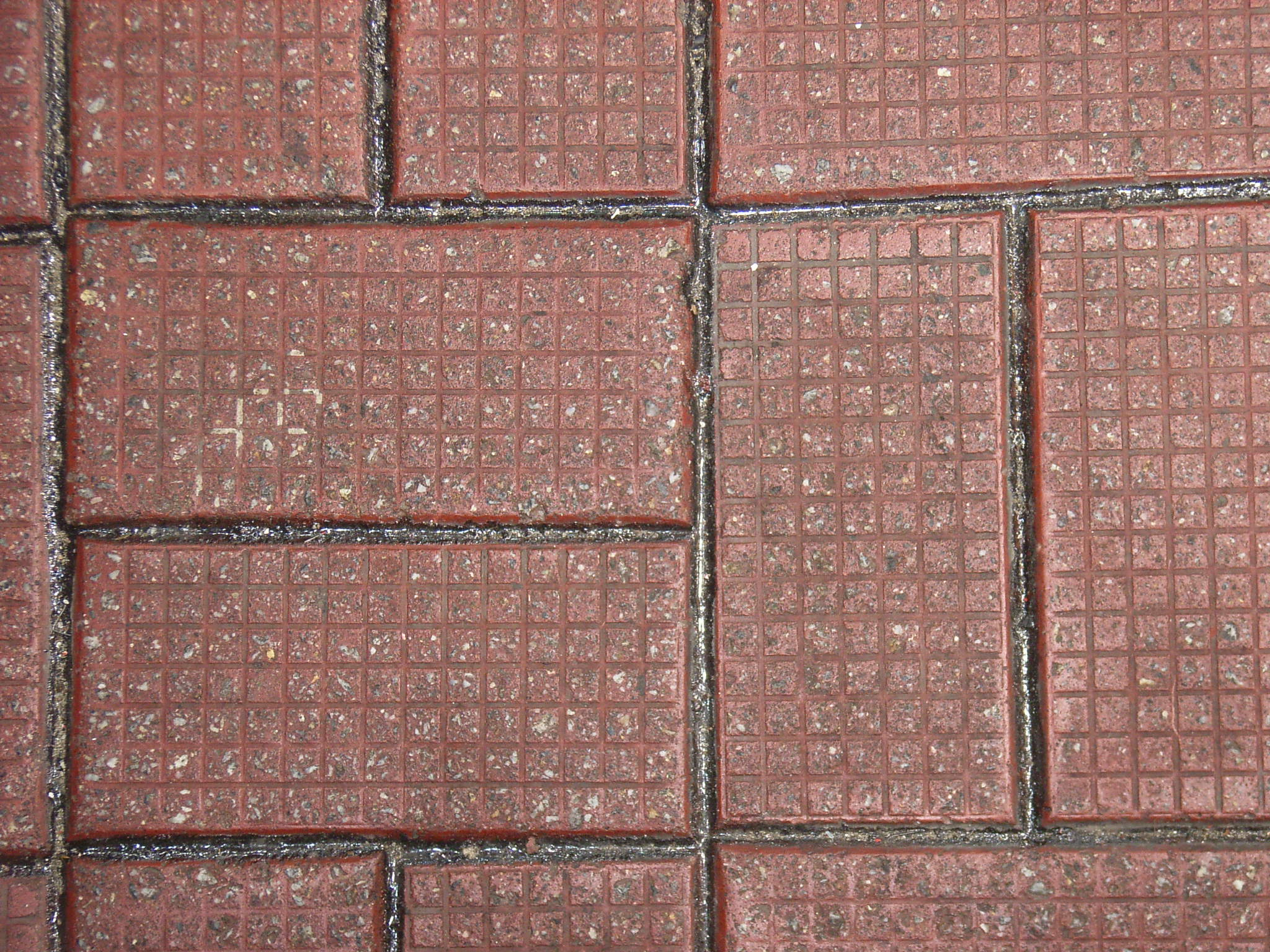
Bricks are glued together to prevent people from using the bricks as weapons.

A total of 9,000 officers from the Hong Kong Police Force were on stand-by for the conference, which was one-third of the regular police force and the greatest number of all the activities the police force has ever been involved in. Officers underwent riot control and shield training. Some of them were sent to observe security arrangements for the Asia-Pacific Economic Cooperation forum summit in Pusan, South Korea.

The Commissioner of Police, Dick Lee provided reassurances that weapons such as water cannons and plastic bullets would not be used. Given the police's experience in dealing with previous riots, such as those involving Vietnamese refugees in the 1990s, Mr Lee said the Hong Kong Police Force should be able to handle any protests. In the unlikely event of an emergency which the police cannot handle, the Chief Executive had the power to seek help from the Hong Kong detachment of the People's Liberation Army (PLA). Provisions for this were in the Hong Kong Basic Law. On 17 December, the Hong Kong Police Force used tear gas, pepper spray and fire hoses in order to suppress the demonstrators. Almost 1000 demonstrators have been detained.

The police force formed nine working groups responsible for different aspects of the conference, drawing manpower from all over the force. The working groups included: logistics; traffic management; manpower and procurement; public relations; command and control; IT and communications; public order; security; and tactics and training.

To stop protesters, fences around the Hong Kong Convention and Exhibition Centre were erected. French windows of shops, including McDonald's in Sun Hung Kai Centre, which is close to the Wan Chai Sports Ground protest zone, were surrounded by wire nettings. The Wan Chai Cargo Handling Basin in Wan Chai, which was also assigned as a protest zone, had fences surrounding the area. The ground of the Cargo Handling Basin was also levelled.

Drain covers outside Wanchai Tower were secured, and bricks on the ground in Wan Chai also glued together to prevent protesters from digging them up. Nets were placed around footbridges in Wan Chai and Causeway Bay to prevent objects from being thrown onto the roads.

The seven commercial buildings around the Hong Kong Convention and Exhibition Centre, for the first time, formed a security network, under which their closed-circuit television systems were linked together during the period of the conference.

Considering the possibility of fire, the Fire Services Department increased the number of officers in the Harbour Road, Wan Chai and Causeway Bay fire stations. The Director of the Hong Kong Fire Services, Anthony Lam, said the current fire equipment of the department would be able to cope as the temperature of general indoor fires is much higher.

St. John Ambulance sent 1,200 people to provide medical aid support. The Auxiliary Medical Services stationed in areas near the Exhibition Centre during the conference.

=== Logistics ===
==== Public transport ====
The areas around the Hong Kong Convention and Exhibition Centre were barricaded from 6pm on 12 December. At least 30 bus routes were diverted when roads to Admiralty and Wan Chai Ferry Pier were blocked. There was suspension of the regular ferry services running between Wan Chai and Hung Hom and between Wan Chai and Tsim Sha Tsui.

The MTR spent HK$10 million due to the WTO meeting and fares were not be deducted as what it was suggested from a legislative councilor. It carried out measures including bypassing stations, temporarily closing entrance gates and changing exits as entrance or entrance as exits in Admiralty, Wan Chai and Causeway Bay stations during the Conference.

To help divert road traffic from Wan Chai, Causeway Bay and the Cross-Harbour Tunnel, the government reached an agreement with the two other tunnel operators, Western Harbour Crossing and Eastern Harbour Crossing, to offer toll discounts of 14% to 25% for private cars, taxi and goods vehicles between 13 and 18 December 2005.

During the Conference there were 80 hotlines (Telephone No. 1834567) operated by the Transport Department for the public to inquire about the updated transport condition.

==== Volunteers ====
The Special Administrative Region government recruited 488 volunteers through two organizations (Hong Kong Federation of Youth Groups and Agency for Volunteer Service) to serve guests in the airport, help with the accreditation application and carry out clerical work. Those volunteers include students, civil servants professionals such as lawyers and retired people.

==== Contingency plans ====
Hong Kong seemed to have met its most chaotic week during the Conference. Most schools in Wan Chai and some schools in Causeway Bay and Happy Valley were suspended during the Conference. All shops and firms in Wan Chai were forced to close early on the opening night due to fear of injury. Some people were stuck barricaded in their own office overnight because of late notification of evacuation. The highway that crosses through Wan Chai was barricaded, and much traffic was detoured. All public transportation, including the MTR, had to skip stopping at the stations of the affected areas. Through the news broadcast on television and radio, the Hong Kong Police Force advised people who were still in the streets near the affected areas to either immediately go home or stay in covered areas until after the demonstration congregation cleared up. The Hong Kong Police Force suggested three criteria for shopkeepers in the affected areas for safety assessment. The criteria included business nature, geographical location, and international position (for instance, whether the shops belong to transnational corporations). The Wan Chai headquarters of the SPCA (HK), Society for the Prevention of Cruelty to Animals (Hong Kong), was closed from 13 December - 18. Most animals were relocated to other centres. All glass windows and doors were pinned with wooden boards.

=== Media ===
Around 3,000 journalists around the world were attracted by the MC6. The Radio Television Hong Kong had also been appointed as the official conference broadcaster of the Hong Kong Ministerial Conference to provide live TV coverage of public sessions. It will also provide facilities for recordings and simple editing by booking.

A press centre with infrastructure and technology provided service to members of the press. It provided computer facilities for concurrent users through desktop workstations, LAN ports, modem ports, and wireless LAN access. In addition, easy access to printers, telephone, fax lines and photocopiers were also offered.

During the proceeding of the conference, the anti-WTO demonstrations and the resulting confrontation with the Hong Kong Police Force consistently received wider coverage by the two local television stations (TVB and ATV) and the press than the progress of the conference itself.

=== Finance ===
==== Budget ====
The MC6 will cost the SAR government HK$250 million.

The items in the budget include:

- Lease fee and fixing costs of the Hong Kong Convention and Exhibition Centre: HK$37m
- IT and communication facilities: HK$37m
- 47 new positions from the Hong Kong Ministerial Conference Coordination Office: HK$31m
- Transportation provided to participants in the meeting: HK$26m
- Membership fees for 50 most least developed members and payment to WTO secretariat: HK$23m
- Stationery including photocopy and fax machines: HK$22m
- Translation, promotion and temporary workers payment: HK$22m
- Security facilities: HK$22m
- Opening and closing ceremonies and feasts: HK$9m

==== Sponsorship ====
The Hong Kong government was the major sponsor of the WTO MC6 conference, using public money to pay for TV, radio, newspaper and brochure ads. Apart from the government support, a total of HK$50 million of sponsorship from business sector has been another source of funding for the MC6. Fuji Xerox, a transnational company, will be the conference's sole printing service provider. The company is trying to move fast-copying machines, which can handle hundreds of pages per minute, from its Asia-Pacific regional offices to Hong Kong for temporary use. It is also said that 6 million sheets of paper, enough to cover 93 standard soccer pitches, may be consumed during the conference. BMW sponsored 280 cars for the country member representatives and WTO senior staff.

== Outcome ==
John Tsang, then Hong Kong's Secretary for Commerce, Industry and Technology and chair of the conference, observed that the conference had been "hard work for everybody involved, especially for [participating] ministers", who had taken part in "more than 100 grueling hours" of talks.

The conference approved a ministerial declaration which many participants described as marking "significant progress", Tsang considered it "a modest triumph", noting as important achievements:

- an end date for all export subsidies in agriculture
- an agreement on cotton
- progress on duty-free quota-free access for LDCs, agriculture and NAMA, and
- an agreed text on the liberalisation of trade in services.

== The participation of NGOs ==
The WTO Hong Kong Ministerial Conference was one of the largest international events ever held in Hong Kong. There were about 11,000 participants. Apart from the 148 WTO members, 1000 non-governmental organisations (NGOs) also took part in the meeting. The Korean Peasants League (KPL), whose members are South Korean farmers, were among the 1000 NGOs. The KPL was involved in demonstrations in 2003 MC5 in Cancún.

During the MC5, protesters were kept behind fences far away from the 5 Star Hotels where the delegates were meeting. This provoked confrontations with security forces and a KPL member, Lee Kyung Hae, stabbed himself to death in protest. The KPL claimed they did not support this act. The KPL group promised to the Hong Kong People's Alliance on WTO that they will adhere to protest perimeters and refrain from drinking alcohol in public, however later they engaged in violent and non-peaceful acts of protests during their duration in Hong Kong.

=== Participating parties ===
The Hong Kong People's Alliance on WTO, the first group to be granted an approval from the Hong Kong Police Force, staged three demonstrations on 11 December 13 and 18 December. There were approximately 7,000 - 10,000 protesters. The Alliance sent about 500 helpers to maintain the order.

Ten representatives from the Korean Peasants League and the Korean Women's Peasants Association, on an inspection trip to prepare for the arrival of the 2,000 Koreans during the conference, held the first press conference outside the Cultural Centre on 29 November 2005. They were dissatisfied with the fence erected at a demonstration site on Wan Chai's waterfront.

Elizabeth Tang Yin-ngor, chairwoman of the Hong Kong People's Alliance on WTO, said protesters had wanted to see and be seen from the Convention and Exhibition Centre, where trade ministers gathered even while they were sitting. Lee Young-so, policy director of the Korean Peasants League, urged the demonstration site to be changed back to the original site and the Hong Kong Government should ensure that their voices can be heard clearly. The Police replied that the fence was a safety measure to prevent anyone falling into the water.

The Korean Peasants League, well known for their militant, violent demonstrations, was the largest group to protest during the MC6. It included 2000 farmers. The farmers claimed that they were only normal farmers and would follow and respect the laws of Hong Kong

=== Facilities offered for the NGOs ===
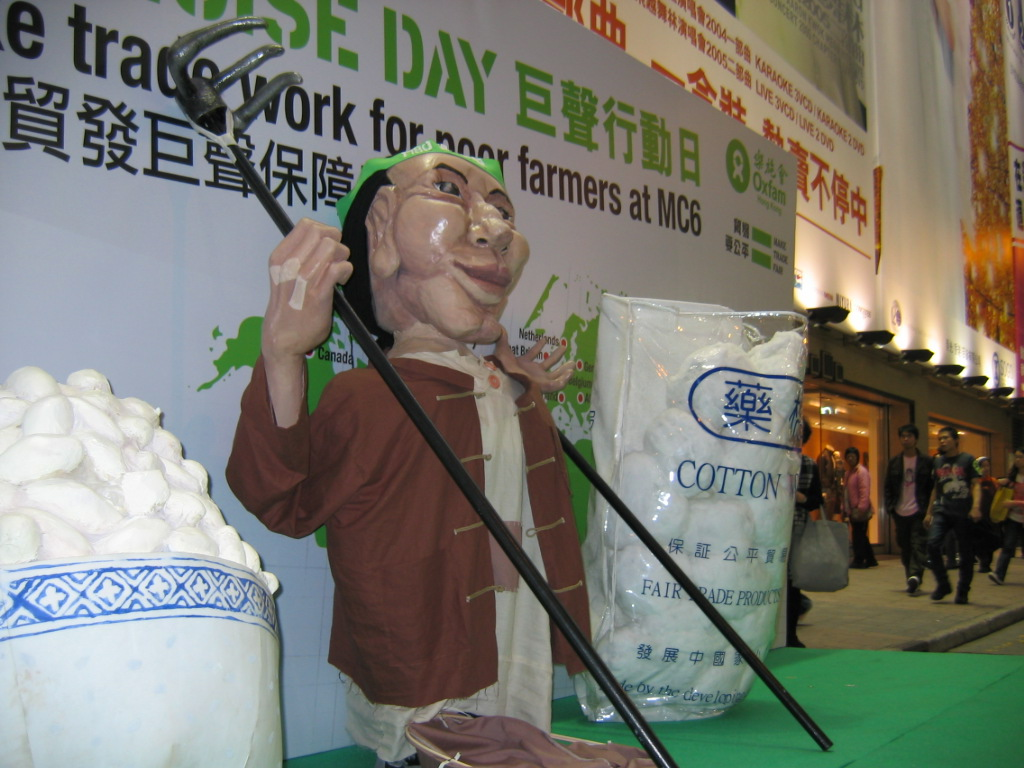
The Big Noise Day parade organised by Oxfam, promoting fair trades among countries.

There was an NGO Centre and other supplementary facilities. The NGO Centre was located at Phase I of the Hong Kong Convention and Exhibition Centre. There are meeting, briefing rooms, and a computer area with desktop workstations, LAN and modem ports and wireless LAN access. In addition, other equipment like printers, photocopiers, telephone and fax lines were also provided. Moreover, extra meeting rooms and briefing rooms were set up for them when necessary. Reservation of these facilities was held by the WTO Secretariat.

The facilities would be well-catered for the NGOs unless there were sudden amendments.

There were five Hong Kong grassroots Web media organizations which cooperated and set up a media centre, to broadcast a live program "Outside WTO" via the internet. They are EP21.org, PRHK.org, TALKONLY.net, and HIRADIO hk, relayed by openradiohk.com.

=== Demonstrations ===
WTO demonstrations
- Location: Hong Kong
- Methods: protests

Parties
"Non-violent groups": Hong Kong People's Alliance on WTO; Oxfam; "Radicial groups": Korean Peasants League; Korean Women's Peasants Association; Supported by: Roman Catholic Diocese of Hong Kong; South Korean government; Taiwanese government	Hong Kong Police Force; Supported by: Hong Kong SAR government

Lead figures
Elizabeth Tang Yin-ngor; Lee Young-so	Lee Ming-kwai

Number
10,000	9,000

==== 13 December 2005 ====
The WTO Conference commenced at around 3:00 p.m. Hong Kong time. The protests were largely peaceful throughout. The demonstrations started with around one hundred Koreans jumping into the Victoria Harbour to try to swim to the Conference and Exhibition Centre where the talks were being held. Police in boats prevented the Koreans from swimming to the Convention Centre, pulled them out of the water, provided them with emergency heat blankets, and brought them back to the central area. Then the activists approached the police force with a burning coffin, and conflicts broke out. In less than five minutes, the police began to use pepper spray to dispel the activists. Nine people were injured, including two police and Legislative Council councillor Leung Kwok Hung. The majority of protesters were peaceful, though, chanting slogans and playing instruments. A group invited into the talks protested during an opening speech. Tsang stated that he was displeased that the protests had involved violence.

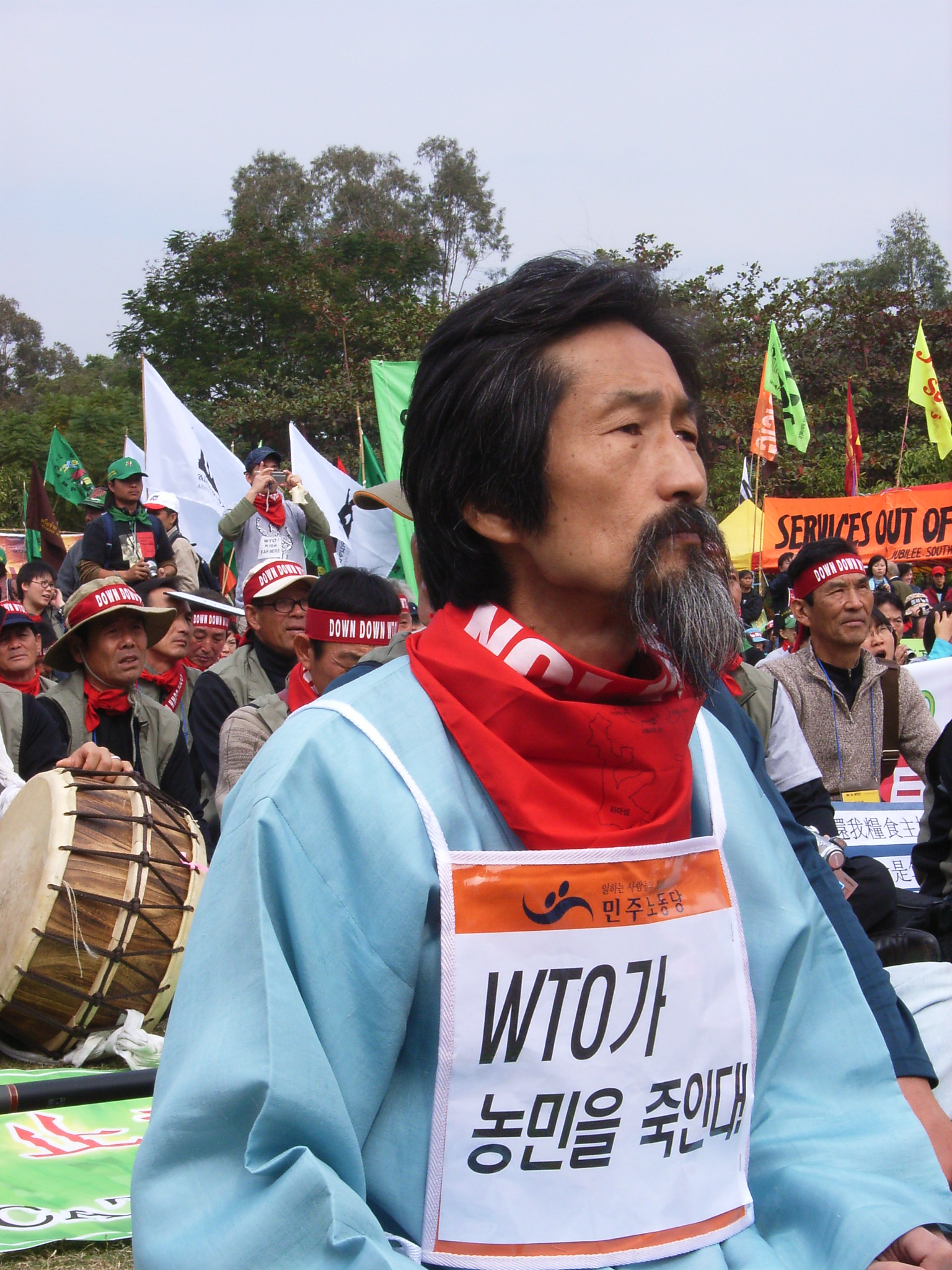
Korean politician Kang Ki Kab also took part in the demonstration.

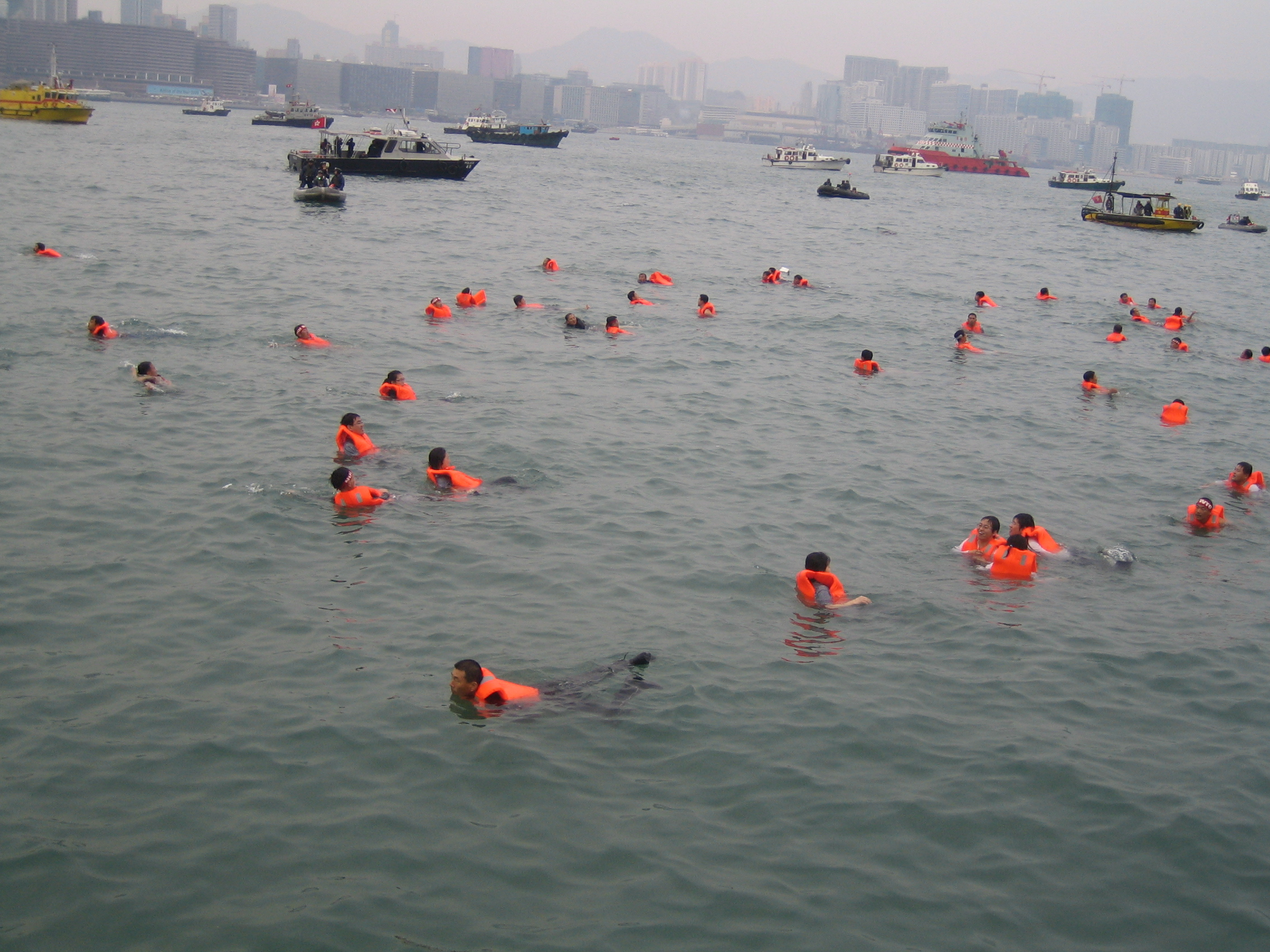
Korean farmers protesting in water

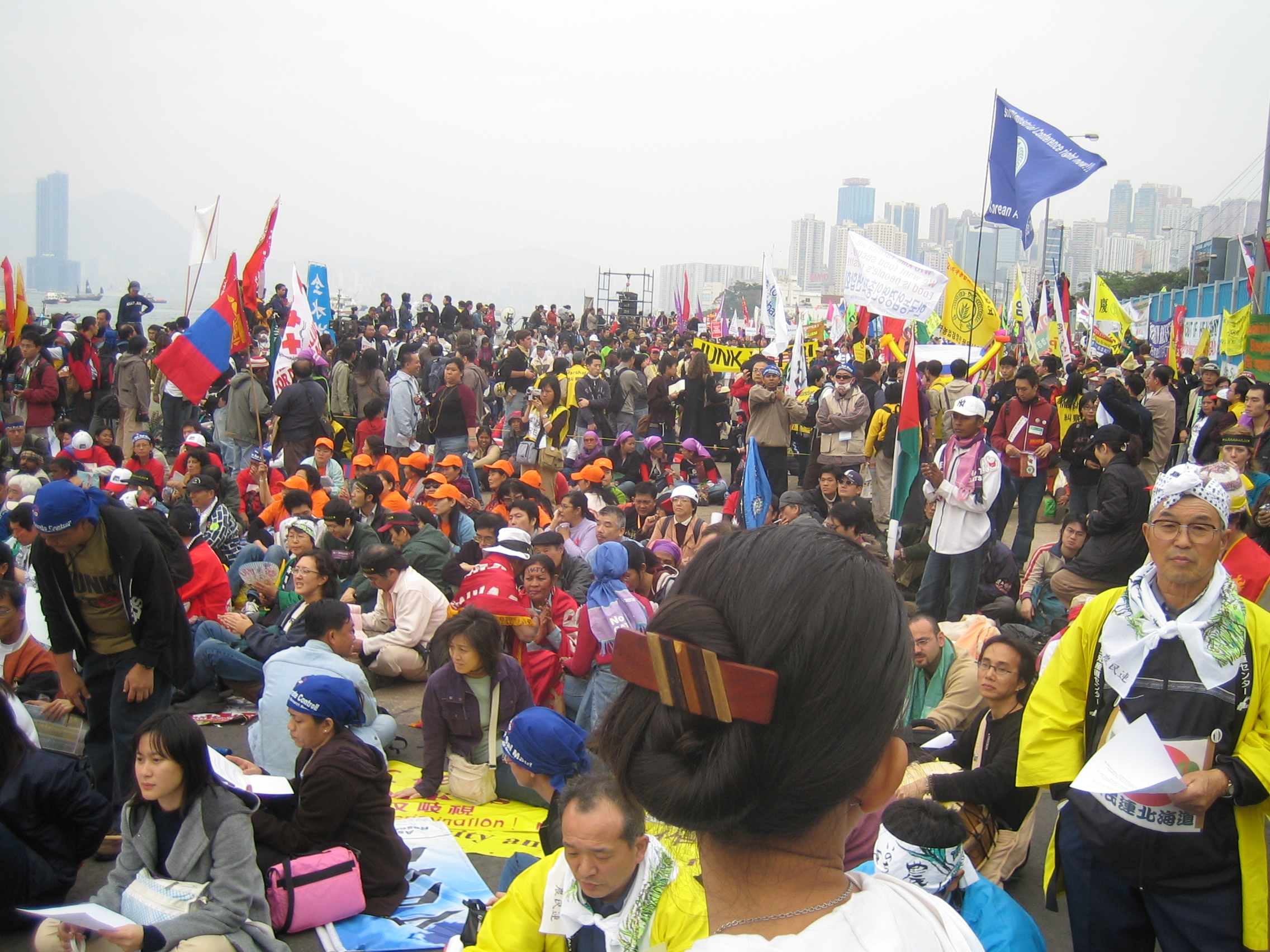
Protests along the waterfront

==== 14 December 2005 ====
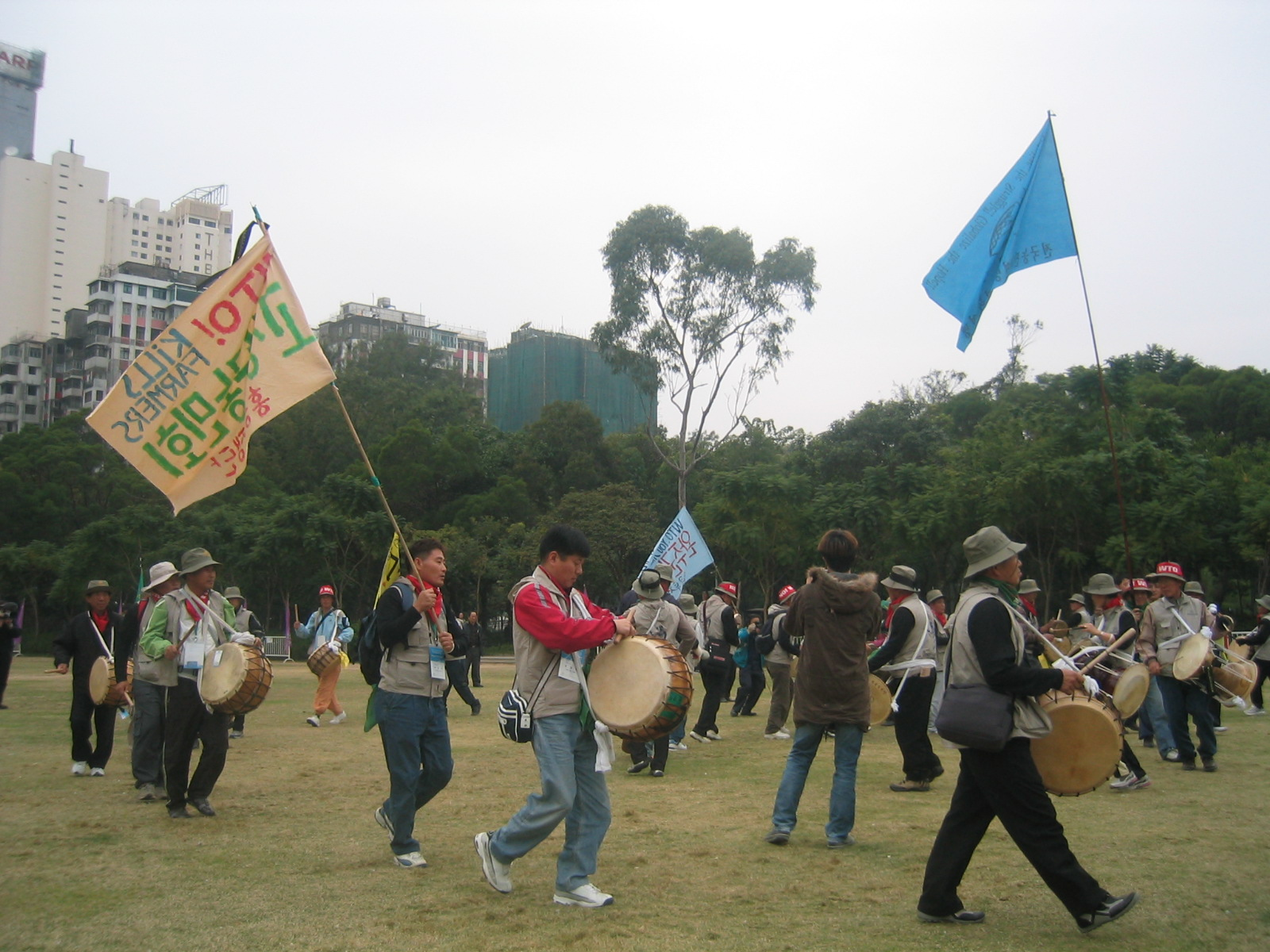
Korean protesters playing drums and raising flags at Victoria Park

Continually there was a slight skirmish between Korean protesters and the police, with the protesters taking fourteen of the police's plastic shields, but giving the shields back to them later. The police continued to dispel Korean protesters with pepper spray, while the protesters wore scarves, hats, goggles, and even plastic wrap to defend against the spray. The police once used a shipping container as roadblock, but removed that later. After about an hour of confrontation, confrontations between police and protesters diminished. The protesters cleaned up after themselves and took their refuse away with them.

Later in the evening, the police commented on the day's protests, saying that the capture of police shields was nothing special and was expected. They also told reporters that they decided not to arrest any Korean protesters because they believed any arrest would make the protesters angry and therefore cause the protesting to be more violent.

==== 15 December 2005 ====
Korean protesters carried out a "kowtow procession". They shouted the slogan "Down Down WTO" and then kowtowed every three steps. They spent no less than three hours to reach the protest zones at Wan Chai, marching in such a way. Their knees were bandaged, their hands gloved, for protection. The procession has been an urban sight. Some Hong Kong youth were apparently moved to join the kowtow-marching.

==== 16 December 2005 ====
Korean protesters threw eggs at the Consulate General of the United States. Some protesters also had their hair shaved in front of the consulate as a symbol of their protest toward opening agricultural markets. See a picture taken by the Sun Daily

==== 17 December 2005 ====
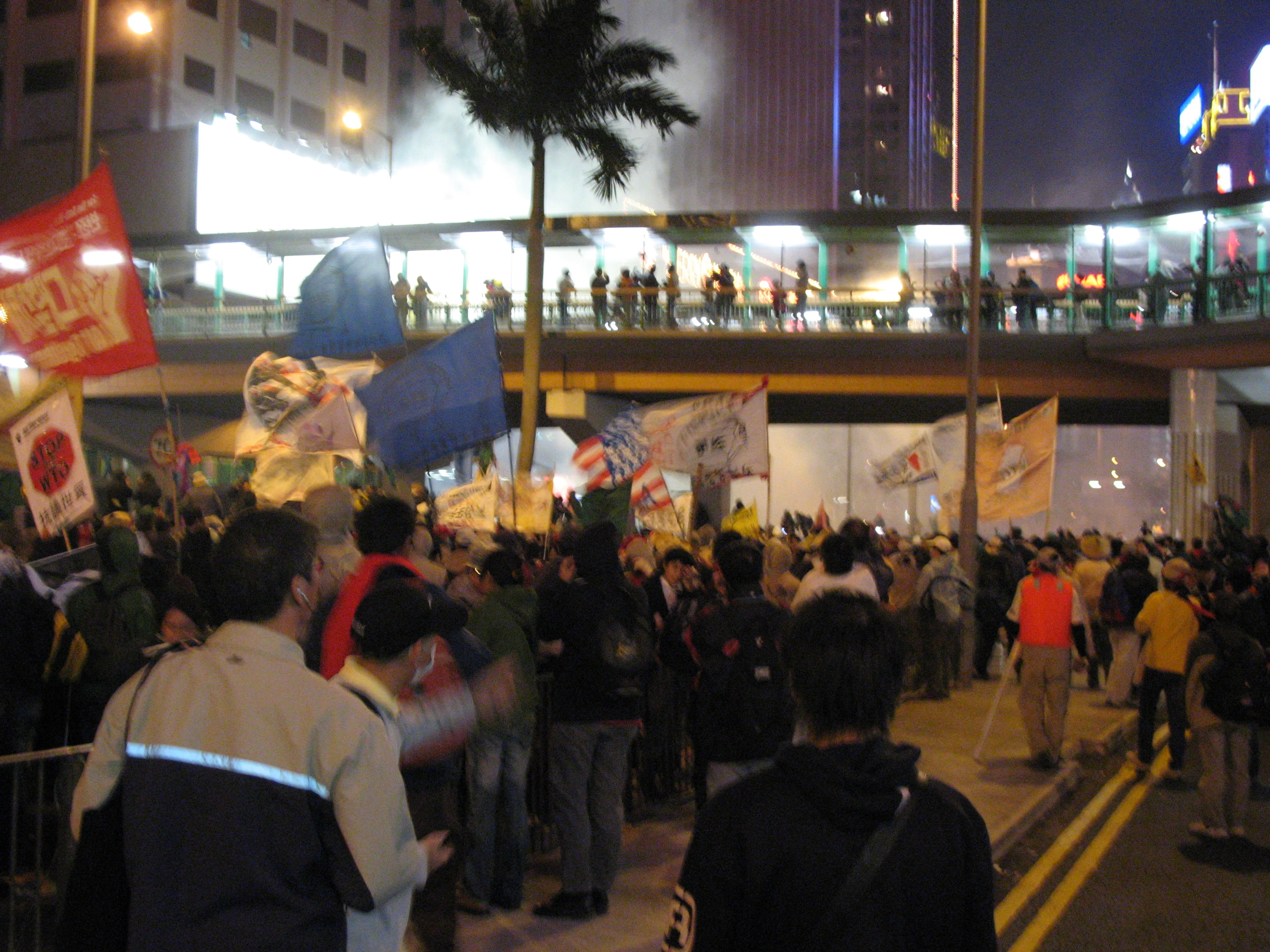
The clash between the protesters and the police. Tear gas were seen fired towards the protesters in the background.

Clash first occurred again in the cargo handling basin at Hung Hing Road. At the meantime, some Korean protesters suddenly broke the police's block between Marsh Road and Lockhart Road, running to Hennessy Road, one of the busiest road on Hong Kong Island, making the entire Wan Chai closed off from traffic. Some of them attempted to overturn a police van but failed. They crossed Gloucester Road, which there were still cars, and tried to reach the Convention Centre.

An escalation of the protests occurred that night. Demonstrators began clashing with police on Harbour Road in an attempt to force their way into the convention centre. The violence led to the closure of the MTR Wan Chai station and the diversion of traffic from the cross harbour tunnel away from Wanchai. Police escalated the use of force and began using tear gas to repel violent Korean protesters. The police were forced to advise Hong Kong residents not to enter the Wanchai area and to contact friends and relatives staying in the area and tell them to leave. Security forces have sealed the entrances to the convention centre in case the protesters breach police lines.

The Commissioner of Police, Lee Ming-kwai, described the protest as a "riot". He also announced that there were 137 protesters and 67 policemen hurt in the clash. 900 protesters, including 730 men and 180 women (the most important are the South Korean farmers and Long Hair), are still under detention on Gloucester Road. He indicated that the protesters will be charged according to Hong Kong Law.

For a complete story of MC6 Resistance that happened on 17 December in Hong Kong and its vicinity, visit Target:WTO.

==== 18 December 2005 ====
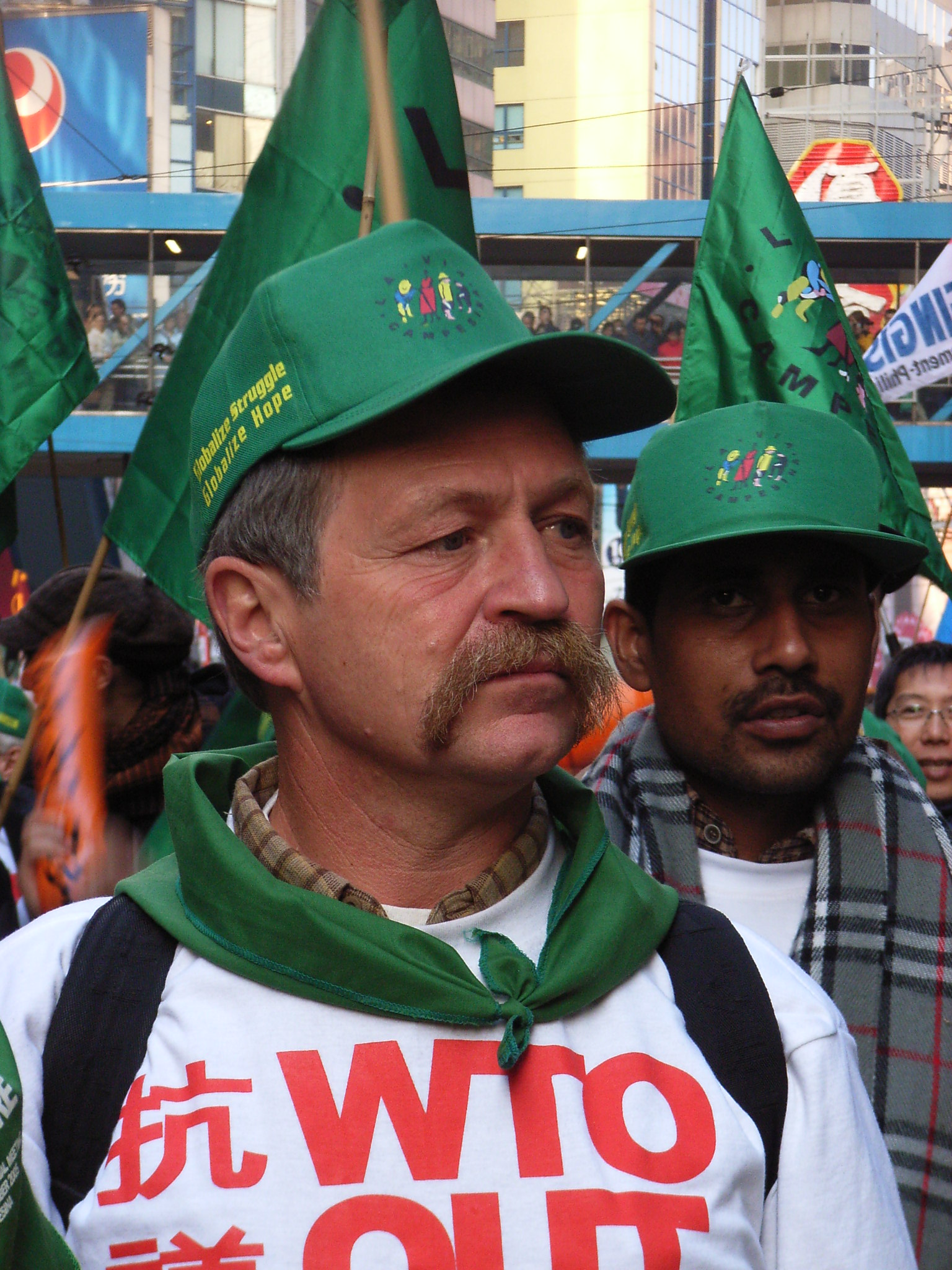
French farmer José Bové also took part in the demonstration in the afternoon.

Early in 11 am, some protesters gathered around Kwun Tong police station and protested for a fair and open judgement of the arrested protesters. At 1 p.m., the South Korean farmers came back to Victoria Park waiting for another protest. Around 2 p.m., all protesters were removed from Gloucester Road, which was soon re-opened to public use.

At night, 188 protesters, mostly Korean female protestors, were released, but still many protesters were in Kwun Tong police station and court. Meanwhile, other protesters, including a number of Hong Kong citizens, stayed at the cargo handling basin of Wan Chai until the end of the conference.

Bishop Zen visited the protesters at 11 p.m. and openly criticised the action of the police as "the shame of Hong Kong" because he was not allowed to visit the Roman Catholics detained by the police.

==== 19 December 2005 ====
Police have charged 14 men involved in the Wan Chai protests for unlawful assembly. They appeared at Kwun Tong Magistracy at 8pm on that day. (Throughout the trial, they could not afford accommodation in a hotel, and so were offered refuge in a church, the location of which remained obscure for privacy reasons.)

They include 11 Koreans, aged 31 to 46, a 29-year-old Japanese, a 22-year-old Taiwanese and a 41-year-old Chinese mainlander. They were among the 1,000 people arrested in connection with the violent protests on 17 December.

Following the release of 188 people the day before, Police this afternoon released 839 Korean men and 105 people of assorted nationality.

==== 22 December 2005 ====
Korean government officers and Taiwanese government officers expressed concerns over the outcome of the court decision pertaining their 14 men subject to charges, that they obtained while breaking the law in Hong Kong. They threatened that further "actions" would be followed up if the men were not released or sentenced harshly. It was also said that an unfavourable court decision may jeopardize the political life of the Hong Kong Chief Executive Donald Tsang, since the political reform bills were voted down in the Legislative Council.

==== 2006 ====
On 9 January 2006, the 11 Korean protesters previously arrested, along with 300 other people including 3 Korean National Assembly members, protested to demand their immediate release.

On 11 January 2006, charges on 11 protesters were dropped. The Korean protesters Park In Hwan (朴仁煥) and Yun Il Kwon (尹一權) are still being charged with unlawful assembly while Yang Kyung Kyu (梁暻圭) had his charged changed to unauthorized assembly. They pleaded not guilty and were bailed for HK$30000 each.

On 13 January 2006, the 11 charged Koreans fled back to Korea. They apologized to businesses in Wan Chai and Causeway Bay for the disruptions during the conference. A few Hong Kongers went to the airport to farewell them.

On 6 February 2006, in the pretrial review, the prosecutors did not prepare adequately. They changed the evidence at the last minute from police videotapes to television footage. As a result, another pretrial review was held on 17 February.

On 7 February 2006, the police reported that they fired 6 beanbags, 34 cans of teargas and 738 cans of pepper spray. 518 police members used sticks to beat up the protesters. They admitted they arrested too many people and did not employ enough interpreters. Of the 910 people arrested, only 202 were allowed to meet with a lawyer.

On 15 February 2006, Yang Kyung Kyu had the charge against him dropped because of insufficient evidence.

On 2 March 2006, the trial began after pretrial reviews on 6 and 17 February, and lasted for almost a month. The magistrate was Andrew Ma (馬漢璋). The evidence, as changed days ago, was a footage from Cable TV. The prosecution called between 10 and 23 witnesses. The accused said the government was trying to score political points by charging them. They and 30 other people protested outside the courthouse. Park and Yun were extremely upset about John Tsang, who claimed they were not really farmers; but the duo insisted otherwise. Yang was planning to come to HK with Park and Yun to support them but stayed in Korea to participate in a strike.

On 3 March 2006, the police admitted that because they took a long time to contain the crowd, the real protesters may have left the scene before all the people there were contained. Therefore, the police may have arrested the wrong people.

On 22 March 2006, the magistrate ruled that there's no case against Park. He was released immediately. A prosecution witness said that Yun had "a protruding jaw, relatively thick eyebrows and small eyes". The defence pointed out that Yun looked nothing like that. The magistrate agreed, adding that Yun was "young and handsome".

The defence also noted that the witnesses had never mentioned Yun in the four statements they made, and questioned how they identified him 18 days after the alleged incident. The defence chose not to defend or call witnesses. The verdict was delivered on 30 March.

On 30 March 2006, the charge against Yun was dropped. The magistrate pointed out that the police did not employ Korean actors when carrying out the identity parade. They did not provide evidence showing that Yun was actually at the scene. Moreover, their testimony was called questionable since they rarely deal with foreign suspects. Outside the courthouse, Yun thanked Hong Kong people for their continued support. Elizabeth Tang, chairperson of HKPAWTO, welcomed the decision and criticized the police for abusing power and wasting money. Joseph Cardinal Zen, then bishop of Hong Kong, blasted the police for ignoring human rights and disregarding the activists' needs. Yet, Cardinal Zen was blamed by the public for his inappropriate and irresponsible comments.

Additional links:

== See also ==
- List of WTO Ministerial Conference of 2005 people
- China and the World Trade Organization
