= Appellate Body =

Standing body of the World Trade Organization

The Appellate Body of the World Trade Organization (WTO) is a standing body of seven persons that hears appeals from reports issued by panels in disputes brought on by WTO members. The WTOAB can uphold, modify or reverse the legal findings and conclusions of a panel, and Appellate Body Reports, once adopted by the Dispute Settlement Body (DSB), must be accepted by the parties to the dispute. The WTOAB has its seat in Geneva, Switzerland.

The appellate body been termed by one journalist as "effectively the supreme court of world trade". The body established a dispute mechanism that allowed states, regardless of their size and power, to enforce predictable market access or at the very least secure authorization to retaliate for harms.

Since 2019, when the Donald Trump administration began blocking appointments to the body, the Appellate Body has been unable to enforce WTO rules and punish violators of WTO rules. Subsequently, disregard for trade rules has increased, leading to more trade protectionist measures. The Joe Biden administration maintained the freeze on new appointments.

== History ==
The WTOAB was established in 1995 under Article 17 of the Understanding on Rules and Procedures Governing the Settlement of Disputes (DSU).

“A standing Appellate Body shall be established by the DSB. The Appellate Body shall hear appeals from panel cases. It shall be composed of seven persons, three of whom shall serve on any one case. Persons serving on the Appellate Body shall serve in rotation. Such rotation shall be determined in the working procedures of the Appellate Body.”

=== Blocking of adjudicator appointments ===
In the 2010s, the United States began expressing opposition to the WTO and its Appellate Body. The Barack Obama administration began to veto new appointments to the body in 2016. However, all the appointments of judges that were initially blocked by the Obama administration were eventually filled. The permanent blocking of the appointments started with the first Trump administration and were continued by the Biden administration. When Donald Trump became president, he complained that the WTO was "biased against the US" and threatened to pull the U.S. out. The U.S. complained that China was too rich to continue receiving exemptions meant for developing countries, and believed the WTO's law enforcement was crippling the U.S. while enabling China's growth as a mercantilist superpower.

As Appellate Body members' terms continued to expire, the U.S. refused to approve any new appointments. By December 2019, the Appellate Body lost its ability to rule because it no longer had at least three judges, the minimum necessary to hear appeals. The WTO dispute settlement mechanism has been paralyzed since. Without a functioning Appellate Body to make a final ruling, any case appealed to it is forcibly halted. As of April 2025, the WTO reported that 32 dispute panel rulings had been "appealed into the void", including 2 filed by the United States and 11 filed against it.

=== Multiparty Interim Appeal Arbitration ===
In March 2020, the European Union and 15 other WTO members agreed to a Multiparty Interim Appeal Arbitration Arrangement (MPIA). This gave access to an alternative appellate mechanism (arbitration as an appellate mechanism) while the Appellate Body is not functional. Its provisions mirror the usual WTO appeal rules and can be voluntarily used between any WTO members to resolve disputes. The European Commissioner for Trade Phil Hogan said: "This is a stop-gap measure to reflect the temporary paralysis of the WTO's appeal function for trade disputes ... We will continue our efforts to restore the appeal function of the WTO dispute settlement system as a matter of priority." As of April 2026, the MPIA consisted of 59 out of the 166 WTO members and had issued three rulings, with other 9 cases pending decision.

A pool of ten arbitrators were announced on 31 July 2020 marking the operational start of the MPIA. The arbitrators appointed were José Alfredo Graça Lima (Brazil) Valerie Hughes (Canada), Alejandro Jara (Chile), Guohua Yang (China), Claudia Orozco (Colombia), Joost Pauwelyn (EU), Mateo Diego-Fernandez Andrade (Mexico), Penelope Ridings (New Zealand), Locknie Hsu (Singapore), and Thomas Cottier (Switzerland).

== Members ==
The following is a list of members of the WTOAB including their nationality and term of office.

=== Current ===
The Appellate Body is currently unable to hear appeals due to all seven positions in the Body remaining vacant and the ongoing lack of consensus among WTO members on launching a selection process.

See Multi-Party Interim Appeal Arbitration for an alternative arrangement used by some WTO member nations and list of appointed arbitrators.

=== Previous ===
- Hong Zhao (lawyer), China, 1 December 2016 — 30 November 2020
- Hyun Chong Kim, South Korea, 2016 — 2017
- Shree Baboo Chekitan Servansing, Mauritius, 2014 — 2018
- Seung Wha Chang, South Korea, 2012 — 2016
- Thomas R. Graham, United States, 2011 — 2015 & 2015 — 2019
- Ujal Singh Bhatia, India, 2011 — 2015 & 2015 — 2019
- Peter Van den Bossche, Belgium, 2009 — 2013 & 2013 — 2017
- Ricardo Ramírez-Hernández, Mexico, 2009 — 2013 & 2013 — 2017
- Yuejiao Zhang, China, 2008 — 2012 & 2012 — 2016
- Shotaro Oshima, Japan, 2008 — 2012
- Lilia R Bautista, Philippines, 2007 — 2011
- Jennifer A. Hillman, United States, 2007 — 2011
- David Unterhalter, South Africa, 2006 — 2009 & 2009 — 2013
- Merit E. Janow, United States, 2003 — 2007
- Luiz Olavo Baptista, Brazil, 2001 — 2005 & 2005 — 2009
- Giorgio Sacerdoti, Italy, 2001 — 2005 & 2005 — 2009
- John Lockhart (lawyer), Australia, 2001 — 2005 & 2005 — 2006
- Arumugamangalam Venkatachalam Ganesan, India, 2000 — 2004 & 2004 — 2008
- Georges Michel Abi-Saab, Egypt, 2000 — 2004 & 2004 — 2008
- Yasuhei Taniguchi, Japan, 2000 — 2003 & 2003 — 2007
- James Bacchus, United States, 1995 — 1999 & 1999 — 2003
- Claus-Dieter Ehlermann, Germany, 1995 — 1997 & 1997 — 2001
- Julio Lacarte Muró, Uruguay, 1995 — 1997 & 1997 — 2001
- Florentino Feliciano, Philippines, 1995 — 1997 & 1997 — 2001
- Christopher Beeby, New Zealand, 1995 — 1999 & 1999 — 2000
- Said El-Naggar, Egypt, 1995 — 1999 & 1999 — 2000
- Mitsuo Matsushita, Japan, 1995 — 1999 & 1999 — 2000
