= Andrew T. Guzman =

American economic law scholar

- Education: University of Toronto (BS); Harvard University (JD, PhD)
- Scientific career
- Fields: Economic law
- Thesis: Foreign direct investment and multinational firm activity (1996)

Andrew Thomas Guzman is an American economic law scholar, currently serving as the provost and senior vice president for academic affairs at the University of Southern California since July 2023. He served as dean of the USC Gould School of Law from 2015 to 2023.

Formerly at the UC Berkeley School of Law, Guzman served as the Jackson H. Ralston Professor of Law, Associate Dean, Director of the Advanced Law Degree Programs, and Associate Dean for International and Advanced Degree Programs.

== Biography ==
=== Education ===
Guzman received a Bachelor of Science from the University of Toronto in 1990, a Juris Doctor from Harvard University in 1996, and a Doctor of Philosophy in economics from Harvard University in 1996.

=== Career ===
Guzman is a member of the Academic Council of the Institute for Transnational Arbitration. Among other publications, he is the author of Overheated, How International Law Works, and International Trade Law.

Guzman's research interests are in international trade, international regulatory matters, foreign direct investment, and public international law. He teaches foreign investment law, international law and international relations, international trade, and contracts.

== Selected publications ==
=== Books ===
- Andrew T. Guzman, Overheated: The Human Cost of Climate Change, Oxford University Press, 2013
- Andrew T. Guzman & Joost Pauwelyn, International Trade Law, Aspen Publishers, 2012
- Andrew T. Guzman & Joost Pauwelyn, International Trade Law: Document Supplement to the Second Edition, Aspen Publishers, 2012
- Andrew T. Guzman, Cooperation, Comity, and Competition Policy, Oxford University Press, 2010
- Andrew T. Guzman, How International Law Works, Oxford University Press, 2008
- Andrew T. Guzman & Alan O. Sykes, Research Handbook in International Economic Law, Elgar Publishing, 2007

=== Articles ===
- Andrew T. Guzman, The Law and Economics of Soft Law, Handbook on the Economic of Public International Law, (2012)
- Andrew T. Guzman, Against Consent, Virginia Journal of International Law, (2012)
- Andrew T. Guzman, Climate Change and U.S. Interests: Reply to Responses, Environmental Law and Policy Annual Review, (2011)
- Andrew T. Guzman, A Strategy for Cooperation in Global Competition Policy, in Regulation and Competition in the Global Economy: Cooperation, Comity, and Competition Policy, (2012)
- Andrew T. Guzman & Timothy L. Meyer, International Soft Law, Journal of Legal Analysis, (2010)
- Andrew T. Guzman & Joly Freeman, Climate Change and U.S. Interests, Columbia Law Review, (2009)
