= David Luff (legal academic) =

European lawyer and professor

Education
- Education: Maxwell School of Citizenship and Public Affairs, Syracuse University (MPA); Université libre de Bruxelles (PhD)

Philosophical work
- Institutions: Université libre de Bruxelles; College of Europe
- Main interests: International trade law, International economic law, Technical barriers to trade, Competition law

David Luff is a professor at the Université libre de Bruxelles, and visiting professor at the College of Europe, He is a partner in the international law firm Appleton Luff. He also teaches at the MGIMO University in Moscow and the University Eduardo Mondlane in Maputo. He has also held visiting appointments in Italy (Bocconi University), India, China, Vietnam, and Switzerland.

Formerly, David Luff was the director of the Programme Management Unit for the TradeCom Facility, an all-ACP trade-related assistance programme financed by the European Development Fund. He was in charge of the planning, conduct and evaluation of more than forty trade-related projects (EPA and WTO).

David Luff has advised private multinational companies and governments in the sectors of financial services, postal and telecommunications services, textiles and clothing, steel, chemicals, sugar, bananas, dairy products, fruits and vegetables. He advised the governments of Vietnam, Ukraine, China, South Korea, Thailand, Canada and South Africa on WTO implementation and trade negotiation issues and undertook missions in more than thirty-five developing countries. He has also advised African countries on cross-sectoral strategies to take advantage of international trade rules and is helping them to negotiate Economic Partnership Agreements. In addition, he advised the government of Ukraine in its WTO accession negotiations and delivered technical assistance in Ukraine to the agricultural and services sectors. He also advised the governments of Vietnam, Sri Lanka South Korea, Mauritius, Comoros, Burundi, DR Congo, Rwanda, Canada and South Africa on international economic law and trade negotiation issues, and on the means to adjust to the challenges posed by multilateral trade negotiations.
