= Caroline Foster =

Caroline Foster may refer to

- Caroline E. Foster, New Zealand law professor
- Caroline Mary Ghislaine Foster (née Atkins; born 13 January 1981), English cricket coach and former player
- Caroline Rose Foster (6 April 1877 – 26 July 1979), American farmer and philanthropist
