= Elsig =

Elsig is a surname. Notable people with the surname include:

- Johanna Elsig (born 1992), German footballer
- Manfred Elsig (born 1970), Swiss political scientist
