= Alan O. Sykes =

American legal scholar

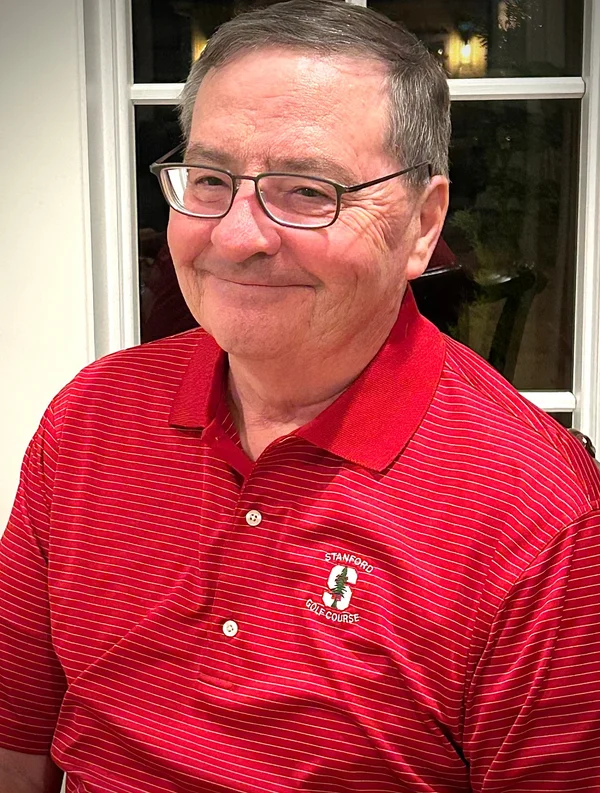
- Education: Yale Law School; College of William and Mary
- Occupations: Legal academic and author
- Employer: Stanford Law School
- Known for: Reporter for the American Law Institute’s project Principles of Trade Law
- Notable work: The Law and Economics of International Trade Agreements; Legal Problems of International Economic Relations; Economic Foundations of International Law; The WTO Agreement on Safeguards: A Commentary
- Title: Professor of Law and Warren Christopher Professor in the Practice of International Law and Diplomacy

Alan O. Sykes is an American legal scholar known for his work on international economic law and the application of economic reasoning to legal problems in numerous fields. He is the Professor of Law and Warren Christopher Professor in the Practice of International Law and Diplomacy at Stanford Law School, where he also serves as a Senior Fellow at the Stanford Institute for Economic Policy Research (SIEPR) and directs the LL.M. Program in International Economic Law, Business and Policy.

== Education and early career ==
Alan O. Sykes was educated at Yale University, where he earned a J.D. from Yale Law School in 1982 and a Ph.D. in economics in 1987. Earlier, he completed his B.A. at the College of William and Mary in 1976. Before entering law school, Sykes was a National Science Foundation graduate fellow in economics and lecturer in economics at Yale. He later spent several years as an associate at the law firm of Arnold & Porter in Washington, D.C.

== Academic career ==
Sykes began his academic career at the University of Chicago Law School in 1986, eventually becoming the Frank and Bernice J. Greenberg Professor of Law. During his two decades at Chicago, he also served as Faculty Director of Curriculum and co-edited two of the law school's flagship journals: the Journal of Law and Economics and the Journal of Legal Studies. He held visiting professorships at Harvard Law School, NYU School of Law, and Stanford Law School.

In 2006, Sykes joined the Stanford Law School faculty as the James and Patricia Kowal Professor of Law. From 2012 to 2014, he served as the Robert A. Kindler Professor of Law at NYU School of Law, before returning to Stanford where he now holds the Warren Christopher chair.

He served on the executive committee and board of the American Law and Economics Association, was a Reporter for the American Law Institute’s project Principles of Trade Law and has been a board member or editor for journals including the Journal of International Economic Law, the World Trade Review, and the American Journal of International Law. He is admitted to the bars of Massachusetts and the District of Columbia.

== Scholarly works and research ==
His scholarship is grounded in economic analysis applied to legal problems, particularly those arising in the global trading system.

His writing addresses the structure and future of the WTO, the design of trade remedy laws, the political economy of international agreements, and the economic logic underlying doctrines such as non-violation complaints and constraints on regulatory protectionism. Sykes recent work addresses institutional failures in the multilateral trading system, the challenges posed by China’s state-led development model, the economics of subsidies and industrial policy, and the legal foundations of digital trade. His books The Law and Economics of International Trade Agreements (2023) synthesizes his economic approach to trade agreements; Legal Problems of International Economic Relations (7th ed., 2021, with John H. Jackson and William J. Davey) is a casebook on international trade law; Economic Foundations of International Law (2013, with Eric A. Posner) extends economic analysis across the broader domain of public international law; The Genesis of the GATT (2008, with Douglas A. Irwin and Petros C. Mavroidis) offers a historical and analytical account of the origins of the global trading system; and earlier monographs such as The WTO Agreement on Safeguards: A Commentary (2006) and Product Standards for Internationally Integrated Goods Markets (1995).
