= List of people associated with the World Trade Organization Ministerial Conference of 2005 =

Apart from officials and representatives of member countries and observer countries, the Hong Kong Ministerial Conference will be the first to house the centre for the non-governmental organization (NGOs) under the same roof as the conference proper. The NGOs representatives will be approved by registration to attend the Conference.

== WTO officials ==
- Pascal Lamy, Director-General of WTO
- Alejandro Jara, Deputy Director-General of WTO
- Valentine Rugwabiza, Deputy Director-General of WTO
- Harsha Vardhana Singh, Deputy Director-General of WTO
- Rufus Yerxa, Deputy Director-General of WTO

== International officials ==
- Peter Mandelson, Commissioner of the European Union for Trade Issues
- Mariann Fischer Boel, EU Agriculture Commissioner
- Margaret Beckett, British Farm Minister
- Christine Lagarde, France's Trade Minister

== Hong Kong officials ==
- Donald Tsang (曾蔭權), Chief Executive
- John Tsang (曾俊華), Secretary for Commerce, Industry and Technology
- Ambrose Lee (李少光), Secretary for Security
- Raymond Young (楊立門), Director-General of Trade and Industry
- Dick Lee (李明逵), Commissioner of Police
- Anthony Lam (林振敏), Director of Fire Services

== NGO leaders ==
The General Council has further clarified the framework for relations with the NGOs by adopting a set of guidelines on 18 July 1996, which "recognizes the role NGOs can play to increase the awareness of the public in respect of WTO activities". On 26 May 2005, the General Council agreed on approving the attendance of Non-Governmental Organizations at the Sixth Session of the Ministerial Conference under the following registration procedures:

- NGOs would be allowed to attend only the Plenary Sessions of the Conference (without the right to speak);
- Applications from NGOs to be registered would be accepted on the basis of Article V, paragraph 2 of the WTO Agreement, i.e. NGOs "concerned with matters related to those of the WTO"; and
- The registration of NGOs that wish to attend the Conference should be made on or before m29 July 2005.

NGOs Eligible for the conference:

International NGO leaders

- Anil Singh, NEED India
- CUTS International
- Greenpeace International
- Asian Regional Exchange for New Alternatives

Hong Kong NGO leaders

- Elizabeth Tang (鄧燕娥), Chairperson of Hong Kong People's Alliance on WTO
- Lau Chin Shek (劉千石), President of Hong Kong Confederation of Trade Unions
- Lee Cheuk Yan (李卓仁), General Secretary of Hong Kong Confederation of Trade Unions
- Albert Lai (黎廣德), Chairman of the Hong Kong People's Council for Sustainable Development
- Dolores Ballabares, Chairperson of the United Filipinos in Hong Kong
- Tse Kam Keung (謝錦強), Chairperson of Oxfam Hong Kong Council
- Emily Chan (陳英凝), President of Médecins Sans Frontières (MSF) Hong Kong
- Global Network (全球聯陣──勞工基層大聯盟)

== WTO members ==
Developing countries make up about three quarters of the total WTO membership. Together with countries currently in the process of "transition" to market-based economies, they play an increasingly important role in the WTO.

- Albania
- Antigua and Barbuda
- Argentina - Alberto Fernández, President
- Armenia
- Australia - Scott Morrison, Prime Minister
- Austria
- Bahrain - Khalifa bin Salman Al Khalifa, Prime Minister
- Barbados
- Belgium
- Belize
- Bolivarian Republic of Venezuela
- Bolivia
- Botswana
- Brazil - Jair Bolsonaro, President
- Brunei Darussalam - Hassanal Bolkiah, Sultan
- Bulgaria
- Cameroon
- Canada - Justin Trudeau, Prime Minister
- Chile - Sebastian Piñera, President
- China - Li Keqiang, Premier
- Colombia
- Congo
- Costa Rica
- Côte d'Ivoire
- Croatia
- Cuba
- Cyprus
- Czech Republic
- Denmark
- Dominica
- Dominican Republic
- Ecuador
- Egypt
- El Salvador
- Estonia
- European Communities
- Fiji
- Finland
- France - Emmanuel Macron, President
- Gabon
- Georgia
- Germany - Angela Merkel, Chancellor
- Ghana
- Greece - Kyriakos Mitsotakis, Prime Minister
- Grenada
- Guatemala
- Guyana
- Honduras
- Hong Kong, China
- Hungary
- Iceland
- India - Narendra Modi, Prime Minister
- Indonesia - Joko Widodo, President
- Ireland
- Israel
- Italy - Giuseppe Conte, Prime Minister
- Jamaica
- Japan - Shinzō Abe, Prime Minister
- Jordan
- Kenya
- Kuwait
- Kyrgyz Republic
- Laos - Thongloun Sisoulith, Prime Minister
- Latvia
- Liechtenstein
- Lithuania
- Luxembourg
- Macedonia, provisionally referred to by the WTO as the "former Yugoslav Republic of Macedonia"
- Macao, China
- Malaysia - Mahathir Mohamad, Prime Minister
- Malta
- Mauritius
- Mexico - Andrés Manuel López Obrador, President
- Moldova
- Mongolia
- Morocco
- Namibia
- Netherlands - Jan Peter Balkenende, Prime Minister
- New Zealand - Jacinda Ardern, Prime Minister
- Nicaragua
- Nigeria
- Norway
- Oman
- Pakistan - Imran Khan, Prime Minister
- Panama
- Papua New Guinea - James Marape, Prime Minister
- Paraguay
- Peru - Martín Vizcarra, President
- Philippines - Rodrigo Duterte, President
- Poland
- Portugal
- Qatar
- Romania
- Russia - Mikhail Mishustin, Prime Minister
- Saint Kitts and Nevis
- Saint Lucia
- Saint Vincent and the Grenadines
- Saudi Arabia - Mohammad bin Salman, Crown Prince
- Singapore - Lee Hsien Loong, Prime Minister
- Slovak Republic
- Slovenia
- South Africa - Cyril Ramaphosa, President
- South Korea - Moon Jae-in, President
- Spain - Pedro Sánchez, Prime Minister
- Sri Lanka - Gotabaya Rajapaksa, President
- Suriname
- Swaziland
- Sweden
- Switzerland - Ulrich Maurer, President
- Chinese Taipei
- Thailand - Prayut Chan-o-cha, Prime Minister
- Trinidad and Tobago
- Tunisia
- Turkey - Recep Tayyip Erdoğan, President
- Ukraine - Volodymyr Zelenskyy, President
- United Arab Emirates - Mohammed bin Rashid Al Maktoum, Prime Minister
- United Kingdom - Boris Johnson, Prime Minister
- United States - Donald Trump, President
- Uruguay
- Vietnam - Nguyễn Xuân Phúc, Prime Minister
- Zimbabwe

=== The Least-Developed Countries(LDCs) ===
The WTO regards the least-developed countries (LDCs)as countries which have been designated as such by the United Nations. There are currently 50 the least-developed countries on the UN list, 32 of which to date have become WTO members.

These are:

- Angola
- Bangladesh - Sheikh Hasina, Prime Minister
- Benin
- Burkina Faso
- Burundi
- Cambodia - Hun Sen, Prime Minister
- Central African Republic
- Chad
- Congo, Democratic Republic of the
- Djibouti
- Gambia
- Guinea
- Guinea Bissau
- Haiti
- Lesotho
- Madagascar
- Malawi
- Maldives
- Mali
- Mauritania
- Mozambique
- Myanmar - Aung San Suu Kyi, State Counselor
- Nepal
- Niger
- Rwanda
- Senegal
- Sierra Leone
- Solomon Islands
- Tanzania
- Togo
- Uganda
- Vietnam
- Zambia

There are no WTO definitions of "developed" or "developing" countries. Developing countries in the WTO are designated on the basis of self-selection although this is not necessarily automatically accepted in all WTO bodies.

== Observer governments ==
With the exception of the Holy See, observers must start accession negotiations within five years of becoming observers.

- Afghanistan
- Algeria
- Andorra
- Azerbaijan
- Bahamas
- Belarus
- Bhutan
- Bosnia and Herzegovina
- Cape Verde
- Ethiopia
- Holy See (Vatican)
- Iran
- Iraq
- Kazakhstan
- Lao People's Democratic Republic
- Lebanese Republic
- Libya
- Montenegro
- Russian Federation
- Samoa
- Serbia
- Seychelles
- Sudan
- Tajikistan
- Tonga
- Ukraine
- Uzbekistan
- Vanuatu
- Yemen

The Least-Developed Countries

- Equatorial Guinea
- São Tomé and Príncipe
