= The Anthology of Swiss Legal Culture =

The Anthology of Swiss Legal Culture makes available a collection of classic and contemporary texts charting Swiss contributions and papers on transcultural influences across various fields of the law. The Anthology is an online work in progress in the English language. The platform offers the editors the opportunity to update, refine and expand introductory texts and to gradually extend it to areas of law not yet covered.

== Purpose and goals of the Anthology ==
The Anthology of Swiss legal culture brings together a collection of seminal texts made available either in the original language or in English translation and to link them to an introduction and a biography of the author in English. The very purpose of the project is to make these texts available online to a wider community of interested legal and other scholars and practicing lawyers. Swiss law is mainly dealt with in German, French and Italian, and much of it thus remains inaccessible to the world at large. Many do not have access to the rich legal tradition of federalist Switzerland and its legal institutions strongly embedded in the continental European tradition, but also with its succinct institutions rooted in direct democracy and a long standing communitarian tradition of decentralised powers. The collection will facilitate access for all persons taking an interest in Switzerland and the legal culture and particularities of the legal traditions of the country beyond black letter law and court rulings. It is thus also of interest in particular to historians and political scientists.

The collection offers insights into contributions written by Swiss authors on various aspects of general legal developments. This angle is predominant up to World War II as there was a remarkable influence on the foundations of public international law at that time originating in Switzerland and Geneva in particular. The first multilingual federacy and democracy largely modelled upon the US Constitution and given its geographical location in the middle of Europe, Switzerland was strongly exposed to international relations and was able to develop an active role in the early days of the Republic, offering a model for European integration. At the same time, Switzerland has been exposed to foreign legal cultures, in particular German, French and Italian ones, based upon shared principles rooted of Roman law, which have had a strong influence on Swiss law and legal culture. Subsequently, in particular after World War II, foreign influences on Swiss law increased. The collection thus offers insights into the reception of developments and trends originating abroad, both in Europe and in the United States in the process of Europeanization and globalization. It has a predominant angle in post-World War II developments. It informs a majority of texts.

== Basic structure of the Anthology ==
The Anthology is conceived in a manner that allows scholars, students and lawyers to easily find relevant texts, a concise background and interlinked information on the authors. Introductory texts facilitate access and understanding, and summaries are available for the readers not familiar with the full text which is attached as a PDF.

== Initiators of the project and partnership cooperation ==
The initiators, Dr Dr h.c. Thomas Cottier, professor emeritus of law, LL.M., attorney-at-law, senior research fellow, World Trade Institute, University of Berne, adjunct professor of law, University of Ottawa, and Dr Jens Drolshammer, professor emeritus of law, MCL, attorney- at law, University of St. Gallen, and faculty associate, Berkman Klein Center for Internet & Society Harvard University, initiated the project „The Anthology of Swiss Legal Culture" in 2008. They subsequently initiated the association „LEGALANTHOLOGY.CH" in October 2015 together with a group of colleagues, some of whom have been involved in the project since the beginning:

Professor Urs Gasser, (Berkman Klein Center for internet & society, Harvard University); Dr Peter Nobel, professor emeritus, attorney-at-law (University of St. Gallen and of University of Zurich); Professor Pascal Pichonnaz, LL.M., attorney-at-law (University of Fribourg); Dr Paul Richli, professor emeritus of law and past rector, University of Lucerne, former chairman of the association LEGALANTHOLOGY.CH and of the board of general editors (2015–2021); Professor Andreas Thier (University of Zurich); Dr Dr h.c. Daniel Thürer, professor emeritus of law, LL.M. (University of Zurich); Dr Nedim Peter Vogt, LL.M., attorney-at-law; Professor Franz Werro, LL.M. (University of Fribourg) and Georgetown University); and Werner Stocker, publishing advisor and treasurer.

The (Berkman Klein Center for Internet & Society Harvard University), with support from the Harvard Law School Library, has developed a Web-based platform H2O for creating, editing, organizing, consuming, and sharing course materials. Some clusters of the Anthology are part onto the H2O platform.

== The association – LEGALANTHOLOGY.CH ==
The association is a non-profit organization (scientific research and communications project) located in Zurich. Its aims are the exploration and presentation of the global dissemination and continuing internationalization of Swiss legal culture with particular emphasis on the 19th, 20th and 21st centuries. The association aims to promote interest in the influence and significance of the internationalization and globalization of Swiss law and Swiss legal culture by means of its online open source collection website and a new series of English language publications. Furthermore, it aims to emphasize how Swiss law, Swiss legal process and Swiss legal culture meet longstanding challenges in an international context.

== Board of the association and Board of General Editors ==
The following persons are members of the board of the association and of the board of general editors respectively:

Board of the association

Dr Dr h.c. Thomas Cottier, professor emeritus of law, LL.M., attorney-at-law, senior research fellow, World Trade Institute, University of Berne, adjunct professor of law, University of Ottawa; Dr Susanne Leuzinger, former Judge of the Swiss Federal Supreme Court; Professor Pascal Pichonnaz, LL.M., attorney-at-law (University of Fribourg); Professor Andreas Thier (University of Zurich), chairman of the association LEGALANTHOLOGY.CH; and Werner Stocker, publishing advisor and treasurer.

Board of General Editors

Thomas Cottier, Susanne Leuzinger, Pascal Pichonnaz and Andreas Thier.

== Current clusters and editing authors ==
- Swiss Law and Legal Culture and the Process of Internationalization before and after World War II (Public International Law), by Thomas Cottier, Isabel Koelliker and Jack Williams
- Swiss Law and Legal Culture and the Process of Internationalization before and after World War II (Public International Law), by Thomas Cottier, Isabel Koelliker and Jack Williams
- Swiss Law and Legal Culture and the Process of Globalization – From World War II to the Present (Globalization), by Jens Droshammer
- Swiss Law and Legal Culture and the Process of Globalization – From World War II to the Present (Globalization), by Jens Droshammer
- Swiss Law and Legal Culture and the Process of Americanization before and after World War II (Americanization), by Jens Drolshammer (book published Verlag Stämpfli AG, Bern, 2016)
- Swiss Law and Legal Culture and the Process of Americanization before and after World War II (Americanization), by Jens Drolshammer (book published Verlag Stämpfli AG, Bern, 2016)
- Swiss Law and Legal Culture and the Process of Europeanization before and after World War II (Europeanization), by Jens Drolshammer
- Swiss Law and Legal Culture and the Process of Europeanization before and after World War II (Europeanization), by Jens Drolshammer
- «Wirtschaftsrecht» in Switzerland (Swiss Economic Law), by Peter Nobel
- «Wirtschaftsrecht» in Switzerland (Swiss Economic Law), by Peter Nobel
- Information Law in Swiss Legal Culture (Information Law), by Rolf H. Weber (book published Verlag Stämpfli AG, Bern 2017)
- Information Law in Swiss Legal Culture (Information Law), by Rolf H. Weber (book published Verlag Stämpfli AG, Bern 2017)
- Legal Philosophy and General Jurisprudence (Philosophy of Law), by Michael Walter Hebeisen
- Legal Philosophy and General Jurisprudence (Philosophy of Law), by Michael Walter Hebeisen
- International Intellectual Property Law, (), by Thomas Cottier
- The Swiss Federal Supreme Court and Constitutional Law in an International Context, (), by Susanne Leuzinger

== Planned clusters ==
Sports Law – International Criminal Law and Judicial Assistance – Family Law – International Arbitration – The Internationalization of the Swiss Legal Professions – The Swiss Federal Tribunal in the World – International Aspects of Swiss Contract Law and Historical Aspects – History of Law (Aspects) – Public Law – Intellectual Property Law.

== Print editions ==
- Drolshammer, Jens: The Americanization of Swiss Legal Culture. Highlights of Cultural Encounters in an Evolving Transatlantic History of Law. p. 1631 (Bern 2016. Stämpfli). ISBN 978-3-7272-3219-0
- Weber, Rolf H: Information Law in Swiss Legal Culture. p. 541 (Bern 2017. Stämpfli). ISBN 978-3-7272-7011-6
- Leuzinger, Susanne: Das Schweizerische Bundesgericht im internationalen Kontext. p. 1052 (Bern 2022. Stämpfli). ISBN 978-3-7272-2688-5

== Literature ==
- Thomas Cottier: Rechtsdenken und Rechtspositivismus: Die Anthology of Swiss Legal Culture. In: Wissensvermittlung und Recht. Festgabe zum 70. Geburtstag von Werner Stocker. Edited by Anton K. Schnyder, Peter Johannes Weber, Johannes Reich, Pascal Grolimund. Schulthess, Zurich 2020, ISBN 978-3-7255-8149-8.
