= Ulan Melisbek =

Kyrgyzstani journalist (born 1975)

Ulan Melisbek (pronounced [uˈlɑn melɪsbek]; born March 31, 1975, in Bishkek, Kyrgyzstan) is a figure in Kyrgyz culture and politics. Melisbek established both the virtual Kyrgyz Diaspora's internet domain and for Kyrgyzstan.

Melisbek's website and newspaper were one of the few offerings of public insights into Kyrgyz politics during tumultuous times, especially for Kyrgyz people living abroad. A rising public figure in politics, Melisbek was an influential revolutionary during the Kyrgyz March Revolution in 2005 (24 March 2005).

Melisbek earned a BA in Economics and Management from Turkey's Marmara University and in Law from Kyrgyz State University and a MA in International Law and Economics from the World Trade Institute, located in Switzerland.

Starting his career as a Patent and Trademark attorney, Melisbek founded the Kyrgyz Patent and Trademark Bureau (KPTB) in October 1999. The KPTB specializes in patents, trademarks, copyrights, and industrial designs as well as aiding foreign companies such as British Petroleum, Bulgartabak, and others. While a member of the Twenty-Second Session of the Administrative Council of the Eurasian Patent Organization, Melisbek held the position of the deputy chairman. Melisbek was also responsible for the Kyrgyz Republic's position as the regional coordinator of the World Intellectual Property Organization. In October 2008, Melisbek began to head the Kyrgyz State Patent Office of Intellectual Property for over a year and a half. After his departure, Melisbek established Melisbek and Partners Consulting, which focuses on protecting client's IP assets.
