= Peter Van Den Bossche =

Peter Van den Bossche
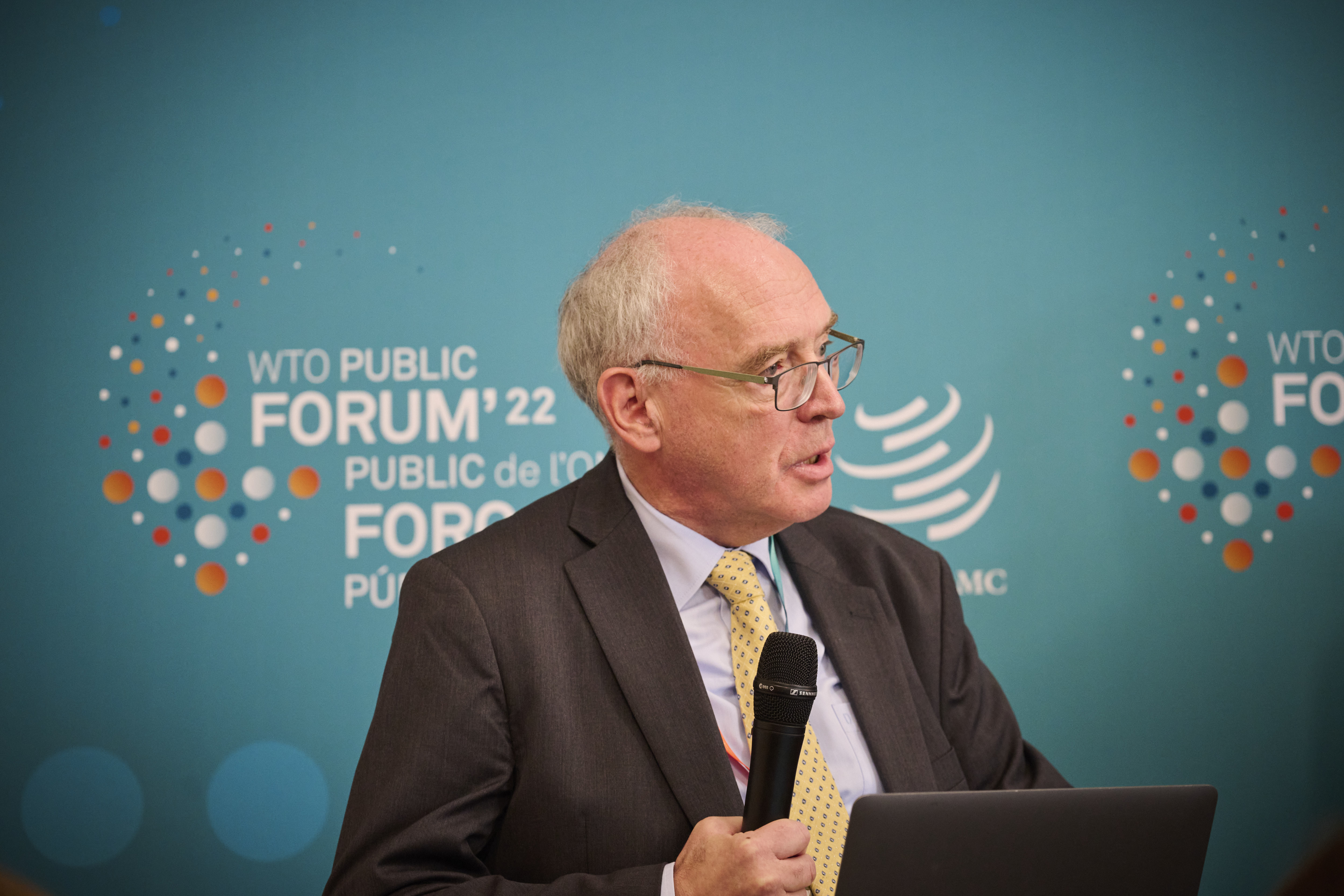
- Born: Peter Leo Henri Van den Bossche; March 31, 1959 (age 67)

Academic background
- Education: University of Antwerp (LLM); University of Michigan (LLM); European University Institute (PhD)
- Thesis: European Community food aid as an instrument for economic and social development and humanitarian relief? Prospects for and constraints on further changes in European Community food aid law (1990)
- Doctoral advisor: Joseph H. H. Weiler

Academic work
- Discipline: Public international law
- Sub-discipline: International economic law International trade law International investment law
- Institutions: Xi'an Jiaotong University; University of Bern; Maastricht University

Peter Leo Henri Van den Bossche (born 31 March 1959) is a Belgian legal scholar. Van den Bossche professor of international economic law at the school of law of Xi'an Jiaotong University in China. Previously he was a professor at the World Trade Institute of the University of Bern. In 2018 he was elected president of the Society of International Economic Law (SIEL). He served as a judge on the Appellate Body of the World Trade Organization (WTO) from 2009-2017, following nomination by the European Union and appointment and re-appointment by the Member states of the World Trade Organization. In December 2013 his appointment was renewed. With the end of his formal appointment at the end of 2017, US-driven delays in appointing his replacement alongside US blocking of other key WTO vacancies has meant a growing crisis for the WTO-based multilateral trading system. The election of van den Bossche (an outgoing WTO judge) as SIEL president is considered by some a sign of both defiance to economic nationalism and support for the rules-based multilateral system.

Prior to his appointment at the University of Bern, he was employed at the Faculty of Law of Maastricht University (1992-2016), where he was senior lecturer from 1993-2001, and Professor of International economic law from 2001-2016. From 2005-2009 he was head of department of the Department of International and European Law. In 2007 he founded the Institute for Globalization and International Regulation. From 1990 to 1992, he worked as référendaire at the European Court of Justice in Luxembourg and, from 1997 to 2001, as senior legal advisor to the WTO Appellate Body in Geneva. He serves on the Advisory Board of several academic law journals: Journal of World Investment and Trade; Journal of International Economic Law; and Revista Latinoamericana de Derecho Comercial Internacional. He is also on the advisory board for the WTO Chairs Programme of the World Trade Organization. Through its various editions, his book The Law and Policy of the World Trade Organization has become a standard reference on international trade law and the dispute settlement mechanism. (See International Trade Law.)

He received a PhD from the European University Institute in Florence (1990). He also holds a Licence en Droit magna cum laude from the University of Antwerp and an LL.M. from the University of Michigan Law School.

== Books ==
- Charnovitz, Steve, Debra P. Steger, and Peter Van den Bossche, eds., Law in the service of human dignity, Cambridge University Press, 2005, ISBN 9781139448420, 9781139448420;
- Van den Bossche, Peter, The Law and Policy of the World Trade Organization, Cambridge University Press, 2008, ISBN 9780521898904, 9780521898900, 9780521727594, 9780521727596;
- Schneider, Hildegard, and Peter van den Bossche, eds. Protection of cultural diversity from a European and international perspective, Vol. 9. Intersentia Uitgevers NV, 2008. ISBN 9789050958646,9050958648;
- Van den Bossche, Peter, and Denise Prévost, Essentials of WTO law, Cambridge University Press, 2016, ISBN 9781107035836, 978110703583X, 9781107638938, 9781107638933;
- Van den Bossche, Peter, Leo Henry, and Werner Zdouc. The Law and Policy of the World Trade Organization: Text, Cases and Materials, Cambridge University Press, 2017, ISBN 9781107694293,971107694299.
