= Sergio Puig =

International trade law scholar

Sergio Puig de la Parra, also known as Sergio Puig, is a legal scholar specialized in international economic law. He currently holds a Joint Chair at the Department of Law and the Robert Schuman Centre of the European University Institute, one of Europe's leading postgraduate institutions.

== Career ==
Sergio Puig de la Parra was born in Mexico City, and completed his Bachelor of Laws at Instituto Tecnológico Autónomo de México. He then obtained graduate degrees in law (JSM and JSD) from Stanford University. He then held teaching appointments at Stanford University, Duke University, University of Sydney, and the University of Colorado Boulder before joining the University of Arizona in 2014, where he was appointed Evo DeConcini Professor of Law. In 2023, he took a leave from his position at the University of Arizona to join the European University Institute, initially for a five-year appointment.

Outside academia, Puig de la Parra acquired practical legal experience in the field of international trade law, notably by working at the International Centre for Settlement of Investment Disputes, where he also acted as an arbitrator in the "Legacy Vulcan" case. Puig de la Parra was part of the Expert Committee for Mexico’s Legal and Constitutional Reform Regarding Indigenous and Afromexican Peoples’ Rights, contributed to a set of constitutional changes proposed in 2021 and ultimately adopted in 2024.

== Academic contribution ==
Puig de la Parra's research focuses on the role of international law in solving global challenges such as growing inequality and uneven modernization. As of late 2024, Google Scholar features over 2000 citations to his work, and he is one of the most cited law professors at the University of Arizona. His book At the Margins of Globalization: Indigenous Peoples and International Economic Law has been positively reviewed at a number of high-profile journals, such as The British Yearbook of International Law, the World Trade Review and the American Journal of International Law.

As of 2025, Puig de la Parra is a co-head editor at the Journal of International Economic Law, a highly-cited legal journal. He is also a member of the editorial board of the American Journal of International Law.

== Selected publications ==
- Sergio Puig, "At the Margins of Globalization: Indigenous Peoples and International Economic Law"
- Sergio Puig, Gregory Shaffer, "Imperfect Alternatives: Institutional Choice and the Reform of Investment Law"
- Sergio Puig, James E. Rogers, "International Indigenous Economic Law"
- Sergio Puig, "No Right without a Remedy: Foundations of Investor-State Arbitration"
- Sergio Puig, "Social Capital in the Arbitration Market"
