= Manfred Elsig =

Manfred Elsig (born 1970 in Brig-Glis, Valais) is Managing Director and Professor of International Relations at the World Trade Institute of the University of Bern, Switzerland (since 2014). He was director of the Swiss National Science Foundation-funded NCCR Trade Regulation from 2013 until the project ended in 2017. He is co-founder of the collaborative Design of Trade Agreements database. and the Electronic Database of Investment Treaties.He has published more than 30 articles in international peer-reviewed journals.

He is one of the editors of the World Trade Review and Member of the Governing Council of the Swiss Network of International Studies (SNIS).

Professor Elsig studied political science at the universities of Bern and Bordeaux. He received his PhD in 2002 from the University of Zurich with a dissertation on European Union trade policy. From 2005 to 2009, he worked as a post-doc fellow at the World Trade Institute and at the Graduate Institute of International and Development Studies in Geneva. His research focuses primarily on the politics of international trade, regional trade agreements, European trade policy, international organisations, US–EU relations, and private actors in global politics.

== Employment history ==
Elsig has held several academic and policy-related positions in Switzerland and abroad.

Assistant Professor of International Relations, World Trade Institute, University of Bern, (2009-2013) Post-doctoral fellow, World Trade Institute, Bern and the Graduate Institute of International and Development Studies, Geneva (2005-2009) Teaching fellow, London School of Economics and Political Science (2004-2005) Personal advisor, Minister of Economy of Canton Zurich (2002-2004) Public policy expert, UBS financial services group (2001-2002) Trade diplomat, Swiss Federal Office for Foreign Economic Affairs (1997-1999)

== Selected books ==
- The Shifting Landscape of Global Trade Governance. Cambridge: Cambridge University Press (co-edited with Michael Hahn and Gabriele Spilker) (2019).
- Assessing the World Trade Organization: Fit For Purpose. Cambridge: Cambridge University Press (co-edited with Bernard Hoekman and Joost Pauwelyn) (2017)
- Trade Cooperation: The Purpose, Design and Effects of Preferential Trade Agreements. Cambridge: Cambridge University Press (co-edited with Andreas Dür) (2015)
- Governing the World Trade Organization: Past, Present and Beyond Doha. Cambridge: Cambridge University Press (co-edited with Thomas Cottier) (2011)
- The EU’s Foreign Economic Policies: A Principal-Agent Perspective. London: Routledge (co-edited with Andreas Dür) (2011)
- The EU’s Common Commercial Policy. Institutions, Interests and Ideas. Aldershot: Ashgate Publisher (2002)
