= Luiz Olavo Baptista =

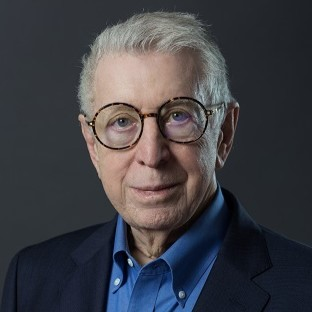
- Luiz Olavo Baptista in 2017.

President of the WTO Appellate Body

Member of the WTO Appellate Body

Personal details
- Born: July 24, 1938 Itu, São Paulo, Brazil
- Died: October 18, 2019 (aged 81) São Paulo, SP
- Education: Pontifical Catholic University of São Paulo, University of São Paulo
- Profession: Lawyer, arbitrator, writer, university professor and researcher

Luiz Olavo Baptista (Itu, July 24, 1938 – São Paulo, October 18, 2019) was a Brazilian jurist, lawyer, arbitrator, and International Law professor. Among other positions, he acted as President of the Appellate Body of the World Trade Organization, of which he was a member between 2001 and 2008.

== Biography ==
Luiz Olavo Baptista was born in Itu, in rural São Paulo, in 1938. In 1958, he was admitted to Law School at the Pontifical Catholic University of São Paulo. After graduating in 1963, he started practising law at a firm of his own.

During the Military dictatorship in Brazil, he defended persecuted politicians as a lawyer, and later joined the truth commission of the Order of Attorneys of Brazil in São Paulo. After being blackmailed into dropping the defense of defendants during the regime of Ernesto Geisel, Luiz Olavo moved with his wife Marta Rossetti Batista and son Humberto to France in the 1970s, where he developed his doctorate. After returning to Brazil, he resumed his practice as lawyer and was a pioneer in advocating the use of arbitration in the country with research and publications at the University of São Paulo Law School, where he was a professor of international law for three decades.

After being nominated by the President of Brazil in 2001, he became a member of the Appellate Body of the World Trade Organization, of which he was president between 2007 and 2008, when he returned to legal and arbitral practice in Brazil at his firm, L.O. Baptista Advogados. In 2015, he left this office and founded Atelier Jurídico, an educational and research think tank, where he worked as arbitrator and legal expert, and the firm Nakagawa Baptista & Baptista, specializing in private law.

Luiz Olavo died in São Paulo (SP, Brazil) on October 18, 2019, at 81 years of age.

== Academic career ==
Luiz Olavo Baptista was one of the Brazilian pioneers in international arbitration and international trade law, worked as professor at universities in Brazil, the United States and France, and was the author of several books.

After completing his law degree from Pontifical Catholic University of São Paulo in 1963 and starting his career as a lawyer, Baptista completed his postgraduate studies at Columbia University in the US and The Hague Academy of International Law. In 1973, he became a law professor at PUC-SP, where he taught until 1980. Between 1976 and 1981, he obtained a doctorate in the use of joint ventures in international trade from the University of Paris II Panthéon-Assas, and in 1979 he was visiting scholar at the University of Michigan. In 1978, he began teaching at the University of São Paulo Law School, where he defended, in 1986, his habilitation on the then emerging topic of international electronic funds transfer, and obtained full professorship at USP in 1992. In the late 1990s, he was a visiting scholar at the University of Paris II.

After retiring from USP in 2008, he received an honorary doctorate degree from the University of Lisbon in 2009. He was lauded professor emeritus at the University of São Paulo Ribeirão Preto Law School in 2015 and, in 2018, he received the "Studies of Peace and Conflict Resolution" chair in honor of Teresa Cristina of the Two Sicilies by the University of São Paulo.

== Legal career ==
Luiz Olavo Baptista was recognized as one of the most eminent Brazilian jurists in the field of international and commercial law, as well as one of the most active arbitrators in the country's history, having participated in about 1,400 arbitrations in over 50 years of activity.

He worked as an attorney for over 40 years, helping the law firm he joined after graduation grow into one of the most renowned offices in Brazil, advising governments, international organizations and large companies in Brazil and abroad. Baptista was part of the United Nations Compensation Commission that ruled on compensation for victims of the Gulf War. He was project advisor to the World Bank, the United Nations Conference on Trade and Development, the United Nations Center on Transnational Corporations, and the United Nations Development Programme. Within the Mercosur, he was an arbitrator at the Protocol of Brasilia, where he ruled on a dispute over subsidies for pork production between Argentina and Brazil. He served as arbitrator in major Brazilian and international arbitration courts, including the Permanent Court of Arbitration and the International Chamber of Commerce (ICC). In the investment arbitration sector, he ruled in several high-profile cases, such as Lanco v. Argentina (ICSID Case No. ARB/97/6), Malicorp v. Egypt (ICSID Case No. ARB/08/18), and Alten v. Spain (SCC Case No. 2015/036).

He worked in class associations throughout his career, and was elected president of the São Paulo Lawyers' Association (AASP) between 1979 and 1980 and the Federal Branch of the Order of Attorneys of Brazil between 1981 and 1983.

In 2001, he was appointed by the Fernando Henrique Cardoso administration to serve as a member of the Appellate Body of the World Trade Organization, the first Brazilian to hold such office. He chaired the body for a year in 2007. During his time in court, he judged over important disputes involving the Brazilian government, such as the case of Brazilian cotton and sugar exporters against the US and Europe and a dispute between Embraer and Bombardier, in which Brazil accused Canada of subsidizing its aircraft industry. From 2015 until his death in 2019, he worked as arbitrator, wrote legal opinions and developed research and other projects at the Atelier Jurídico think tank.

== Honors ==
In addition to academic titles, Baptista was appointed Great Officer of the Order of Rio Branco in 1996 by the Ministry of Foreign Affairs of Brazil. In 2005, he received the High Distinction Award by the Brazilian Superior Military Court. He received the Anchieta medal from the Municipal Chamber of São Paulo and the Barão de Ramalho award by the São Paulo Institute of Lawyers (IASP).

== Partial bibliography ==
=== Books ===
- Arbitragem e comércio internacional: estudos em homenagem a Luiz Olavo Baptista (2013) ISBN 9788576756705.
- Arbitragem comercial e internacional (2011) ISBN 9788577211395
- Novas fronteiras do direito na informática e telemática (2001) ISBN 9788502036475.
- Normas de direito internacional (2000) ISBN 9788573229134.
- MERCOSUL: Das negociações à implantação. (1998) Com Araminta de Azevedo Mercadante e Paulo Borba Casella. ISBN 9788573225051.
- O Mercosul, suas instituições e ordenamento jurídico (1998) ISBN 9788573223743.
- Baptista, Luiz Olavo (1996). Problemas jurídicos e soluções das controvérsias no Mercosul (in Portuguese). Brasília, DF: OAB Conselho Federal. OCLC 50839853.
- Dos contratos internacionais: uma visão teórica e prática (1994) ISBN 9788502013681.
- Empresa transnacional e direito (1987) ISBN 9788520306185.
- Baptista, Luiz Olavo (1986). "Aspectos jurídicos das transferências eletrônicas internacionais de fundos" (in Portuguese). OCLC 426229177.
- Baptista, Luiz Olavo (1976). Contrato de risco (in Portuguese). São Paulo: J. Bushatsky. OCLC 709512494.
