= Caroline Foster (law professor) =

Law professor in New Zealand

Academic background
- Education: University of Canterbury, University of Cambridge

Academic work
- Institutions: University of Auckland

Caroline E. Foster is a New Zealand law professor at the University of Auckland, specialising in international law and the law of the sea, compliance and dispute settlement.

== Academic career ==
Foster completed a BA and LLB (Hons) at the University of Canterbury, and an LLM and PhD at the University of Cambridge. Foster then joined the faculty of the University of Auckland, rising to full professor in 2022. She is the Director of the New Zealand Centre for Environmental Law.

Foster researches the functioning of international tribunals and courts, and their roles. She is also interested in compliance with international law, and dispute settlement. Foster has written two monographs. The first, published by Cambridge University Press in 2011, Science and the Precautionary Principle in International Courts and Tribunals: Expert Evidence, Burden of Proof and Finality, was cited in the International Court of Justice by Judges Bruno Simma and Awn Al-Khasawneh on a case concerning pulp mills, and a dispute regarding international whaling. Global Regulatory Standards in Environmental and Health Disputes: Regulatory Coherence, Due Regard, and Due Diligence, published by Oxford University Press in 2021, was nominated for the European Society of International Law monograph prize in 2022.

In collaboration with Professor Andrew Lang, chair of international law and global governance at the London School of Economics, Foster was awarded a Marsden grant in 2013, On the forge: the role of the international judge and arbitrator in the 21st century, which funded the research for her 2021 monograph.

== Selected works ==
- Caroline E. Foster (2022). "Due Diligence and Compliance with the Protocol on Environmental Protection to the Antarctic Treaty". The Yearbook of Polar Law Online. 13 (1): 154–174. doi:10.1163/22116427_013010008. Wikidata Q124459479.
- Caroline E. Foster (2019). "The Problem with Public Morals" (PDF). Journal of International Dispute Settlement. 10 (4): 622–655. doi:10.1093/jnlids/idz020. Wikidata Q124459480.
- Caroline E. Foster (2016). "Methodologies and Motivations: Was Japan's Whaling Programme for Purposes of Scientific Research?". Whaling in the Antarctic. Queen Mary Studies in International Law. pp. 9–37. doi:10.1163/9789004313828_003. Wikidata Q124459481.
- Caroline E. Foster (2008). "Public Opinion and the Interpretation of the World Trade Organisation's Agreement on Sanitary and Phytosanitary Measures". Journal of International Economic Law. 11 (2): 427–458. doi:10.1093/jiel/jgn011. Wikidata Q124464929.
- Caroline E. Foster (2011). Science and the Precautionary Principle in International Courts and Tribunals: Expert Evidence, Burden of Proof and Finality. doi:10.1017/cbo9780511973680. ISBN 978-0-511-97368-0. OL 20364923W. Wikidata Q124464920.
- Caroline E. Foster (2022). The Development of Global Regulatory Standards by International Courts and Tribunals: Whaling, Tobacco and Renewable Energy. pp. 169–200. doi:10.1017/9781839702709.010. ISBN 978-1-83970-270-9. Wikidata Q124464955.
