= Hong Kong People's Alliance on WTO =

Grassroots organisation which protested the 2005 WTO Ministerial Conference in Hong Kong

The Hong Kong People's Alliance on WTO (HKPA; Chinese: 民間監察世貿聯盟) is a grassroots organization that aimed to protest at the WTO Ministerial Conference of 2005 which was held in Hong Kong Convention and Exhibition Centre in Wan Chai North on 13–18 December 2005.

Representatives for 148 countries attended and HKPAOWTO aimed to lead over 10000 people in protests.

== Background ==
Launched on 22 September 2004, the HKPA is a network of grass-root organizations which include trade unions, community labour groups and organisations that represent migrant workers, students, women, church, human rights, research organisations and regional organisations that are based locally in Hong Kong.

At present, the HKPA has 31 organisations which include regional groups like: Asian Student Association (ASA), Documentation for Action Groups in Asia (DAGA), Christian Conference of Asia: Urban Rural Mission (CCA-URM), and Asia Monitor Resource Centre (AMRC).

Local groups are the following: The Neighbourhood and Workers Service Centre, The Pioneer, Union of Hong Kong Post Office Employees, Association of Government Technical And Survey Officers, Frontline Welfare Employees Union, Globalization Monitor, Global Network, Government Mod 1 Staff General Union, Hong Kong Confederation of Trade Unions (HKCTU), Consumers Acting for People & the Environment, Justice and Peace Commission of the Hong Kong Catholic Diocese, Student Christian Movement of Hong Kong.

There are also member groups of or organizations working on migrant workers, namely: Asia Pacific Mission for Migrants (APMM), Asian Migrants Centre, Asian Migrants Coordinating Body (AMCB), Coalition for Migrants Right (CMR), Far East Overseas Nepalese Association- Hong Kong (FEONA-HK), Indonesian Migrants Workers Union (IMWU), Philippines Domestic Helpers General Union (PDHGU), and The Hong Kong Indonesian Migrant Workers Organization (KOTKIHO).

== Main objectives ==
1. Derail WTO's attempt to conclude agreements which aim to further liberalise trade and investment
2. Pressurise the Hong Kong government to engage the people in its negotiations within the WTO by providing periodic updates, briefings and consultations on contents and agenda of the meeting
3. Raise the consciousness of local NGOs on the essence of so-called free trade as campaigned for by the WTO so as to raise local awareness on the unjust distribution of global economic power;
4. Promote local anti-privatization campaigns
5. Increase awareness of the impact on Chinese working people since China's accession of the WTO

== Action towards WTO during 2005 ==
People's Action Week Programme: 8–18 December

- March/Rally (Victoria Park to Central Government Office)

Sunday, 11 December 1:00pm, Victoria Park

- Cultural Events/Solidarity Night

Sunday, 11 December 8:00pm, Victoria Park

- Opening Public Assembly and Rally

Tuesday, 13 December 1:00pm, Victoria Park

- Closing March/Rally

Sunday, 18 December 2:00pm, Victoria Park

== Working Groups ==
HKPA is made up of 8 working groups.

- Action and Mobilization Group

The Action and Mobilization Group (AMG) is responsible for organizing the public rallies during the action week in December . Since many local groups and overseas groups will join the rallies, however, it is very likely that the Hong Kong authorities will stigmatize the rallies in the media and also impose violence on the demonstrators. AMG is therefore responsible for networking with Human Rights groups to defend the freedom of assembly and the rights of free from violence imposed by the police. AMG will also try to form team of legal consultants to provide legal advice for demonstrators who come across maltreatment from the HK authority.

- Documentation Group

The Documentation Group (DG) is responsible for providing other people with information on the WTO and the HKPA, in terms of position papers and activities. On the other hand, DG will also document the process between now and the WTO's ministerial meeting in HK in Dec. Education and Local Mobilization Group

- The Education and Local Mobilization Group

responsible for providing education on the impacts of WTO to the Hong Kong public. To fulfill this task, it has to contextualize the analysis of the impact of WTO on the livelihood of the Hong Kong. The Education and Local Mobilization Group is also responsible for mobilizing the public to participate in the global justice campaign. Hong Kong Government Monitoring Monitor the Government (MGG) is responsible for urging the government to release the information of the WTO negotiation and defending the rights and interest of the grass root group during the negotiation with the government. ).

- Logistics and Fundraising Group

Firstly, the Logistic and Fund Raising Group (LFRG) is responsible for raising funds for Action Week and education/mobilization activities. Secondly, LFRG is responsible for mobilizing volunteers from different network and local organization for the Action week (include interpreters). Lastly, LFRG will provide logistic support for activities during action week.

- Media and Publicity Group

responsible for projecting the image and position of HKPA to HK media through media statements, activities and mass actions.

- Outreach Group

Outreach Group (OG) is responsible for expanding the international network of HKPA and establishing contact with groups those are under-represented in ICN in terms of the issues they concerned or the geographical area they come from. Programme Group Brief Description Programme Group (PG) is responsible for developing content and design of maximum impact through collective action for the centralized Opening and Closing Plenary. On the other hand, PG will also coordinate all the information about on-going/planned activities for the Action week and produce a calendar of consolidated activities on the theme and sectors for each day.
