= World Trade Institute =

Centre of the University of Bern, Switzerland

World Trade Institute (WTI)
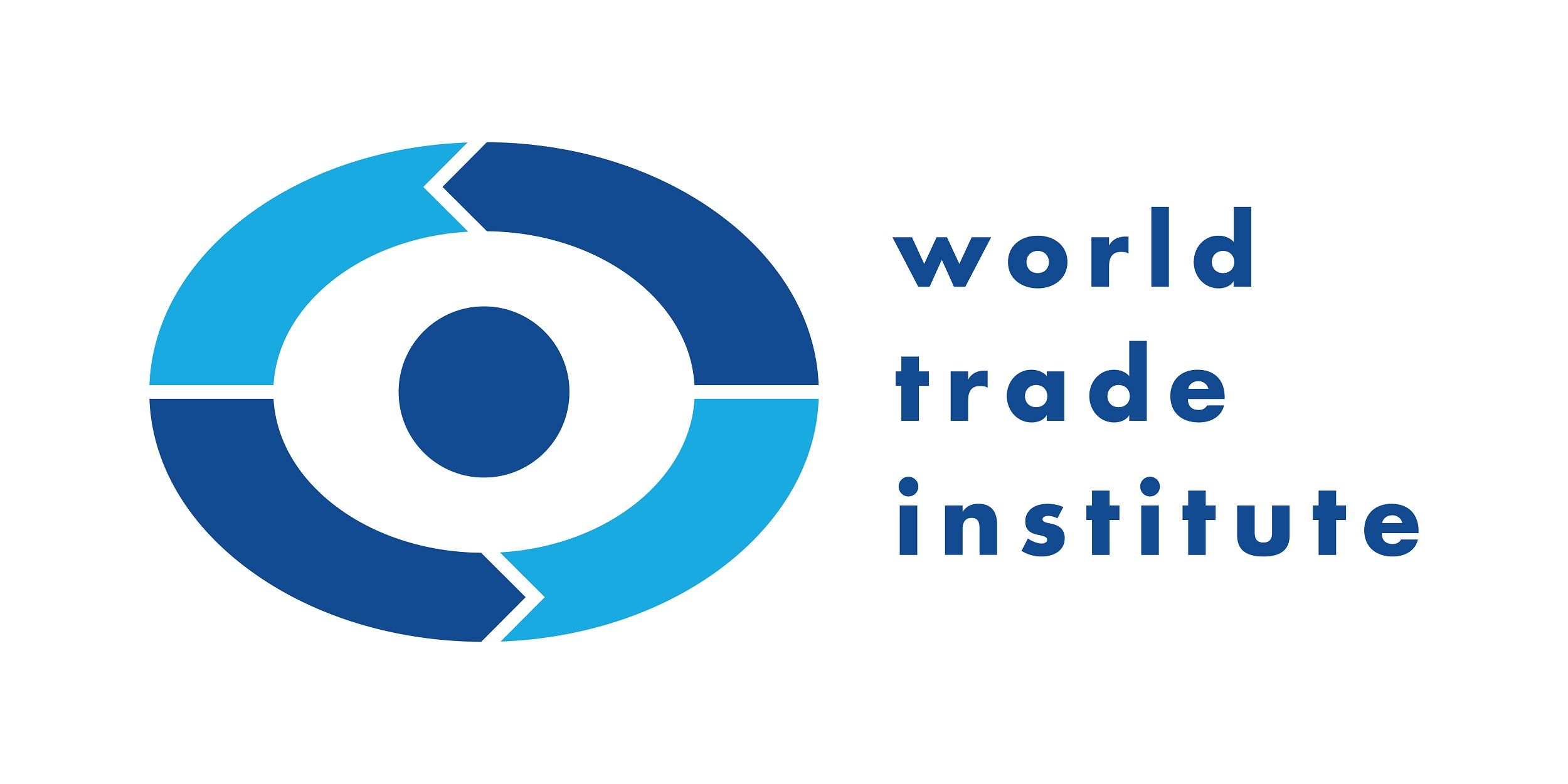
- Established: 1999
- Parent institution: University of Bern
- Managing Director: Joseph Francois
- Academic staff: 7 professors, 7 lecturers, 41 researchers, 32 external lecturers
- Address: World Trade Institute; University of Bern; Hallerstrasse 6 3012; Bern, Switzerland
- Language: English
- Mission: research, education global economic governance, International economics, international economic law
- Degrees offered: PhD, LL.M., MAS, DAS, CAS
- Website: https://www.wti.org

The World Trade Institute (WTI) is an interdisciplinary centre at the University of Bern focused on research, education, and policy support in the areas of global economic governance, international economic law, and international economic sustainability.

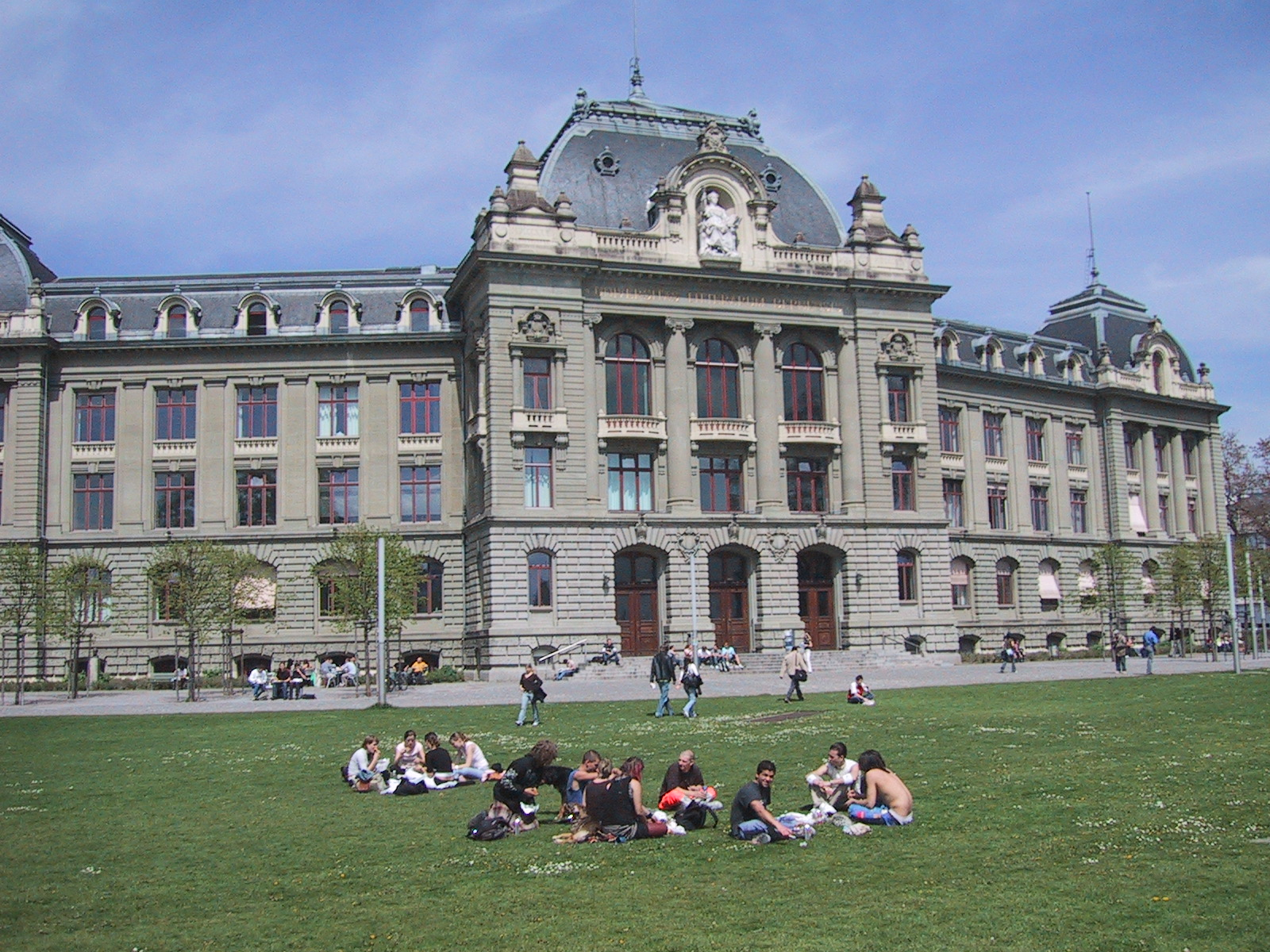
University of Bern

== Overview ==
The WTI was established in 1995 in connection with the Uruguay Round. However, only in 1999 it was set up as an inter-university research institution and training centre of the University of Bern, the University of Fribourg, and the University of Neuchâtel within the framework of world trade law with the support of the World Trade Organisation. Since 2009, the WTI is one of the strategic “Centres of Excellence” within the University of Bern, with a global profile in both research and education. The Swiss National Science Foundation (SNSF) played an important role in the transformation of the WTI into a Swiss university centre of excellence through the SNSF funded National Competence Centre for Research (NCCR) on global economic governance. Other NCCR-based centers at the University of Bern include NCCR PlanetS (focused on exoplanet studies), NCCR Climate (now the Oeschger Centre for Climate Change Research), and NCCR RNA and Disease. Together with the European University Institute (EUI), the WTI organizes the annual World Trade Forum.

Its research and impact assessments on the negotiation, structure, enforcement, and effects of international economic agreements feature in public policy debates. Notable faculty include Manfred Elsig, Joseph Francois, Peter Van den Bossche, Thomas Cottier, Michael Hahn. Visiting professors include Felix Addor, Arthur E. Appleton, Thomas Bernauer and Luca Rubini. Some of the professors are part of the editorial board of the World Trade Review, an academic peer-reviewed journal in the field of economic law, which was created as an initiative of the WTO.

== Academics ==
Degrees earned at the WTI are awarded by the University of Bern, and are regulated under Swiss law governing higher education. Degree programs include a PhD program (offered through the Graduate School of Economic Globalisation and Integration), a combined LL.M. and DAS program in International Trade and Investment Law (TRAIL+), an MAS program in international trade regulation (Master of International Law and Economics or MILE), and certificate and diploma programs in international law and economics. The MILE was established in 1999 and is the flagship program of the World Trade Institute. It is designed for students and professionals with a background in law, economics, international relations or political science. The WTI has over 600 alumni who work for a mix of public sector organisations (international organisations, diplomatic services, trade and economics ministries), non-governmental organisations, universities, and the private sector (law firms and industry).

== Other ==
The WTI is a sponsor of the John H. Jackson Moot Court, the Model WTO at the University of St.Gallen, and a member of UNCTAD's Virtual Institute.
