= Joost Pauwelyn =

International economic law scholar

Joost Pauwelyn is a Belgian professor of international economic law at the Graduate Institute of International and Development Studies, in Geneva, Switzerland, and co-director of the institute's Centre for Trade and Economic Integration. He is an expert in World Trade Organization law. He was Murase Visiting professor of law at Georgetown University Law Center in the United States from 2014 to 2021.

== Background ==
Pauwelyn was a tenured professor at Duke Law School in the United States from 2002 to 2008. He received degrees from the universities of Namur and Leuven, in Belgium, and from Oxford University in the United Kingdom. He also holds a doctorate from the University of Neuchâtel in Switzerland.

== Work ==
He was appointed as appeal arbitrator of the World Trade Organization's Multi-Party Interim Appeal Arbitration Arrangement in the absence of a functioning Appellate Body. Pauwelyn was awarded the Paul Guggenheim Prize in 2005 for his 2003 book Conflict of Norms in Public International Law: How WTO Law Relates to Other Rules of International Law. In 2009, the received the Francis Deák prize, awarded to a younger author for meritorious scholarship published in the American Journal of International Law for his article on non-discrimination. From 2015 to 2020, he was co-editor in chief of the Journal of International Economic Law.
