= Korean Peasants League =

- Hangul: 전국농민회총연맹
- Hanja: 全國農民會總聯盟
- Revised Romanization: Jeongungnongminhoechongnyeonmaeng
- McCune–Reischauer: Chŏn'gungnongminhoech'ongnyŏnmaeng

The Korean Peasants League (KPL) is a NGO whose members are South Korean farmers.

The KPL was involved in demonstrations in 2003 MC5 in Cancun, Mexico, and one farmer stabbed himself to death during the protest.

A video interview was conducted with KPL spokesperson [name unclear] after the event.
