= International trade law =

Rules for trade between countries

International trade law includes the appropriate rules and customs for handling trade between countries. However, it is also used in legal writings as trade between private sectors. This branch of law is now an independent field of study as most governments have become part of the world trade, as members of the World Trade Organization (WTO). Since the transaction between private sectors of different countries is an important part of the WTO activities, this latter branch of law is now part of the academic works and is under study in many universities across the world.

== Overview ==
International trade law should be distinguished from the broader field of international economic law. The latter could be said to encompass not only WTO law, but also law governing the international monetary system and currency regulation, as well as the law of international development.

The international trade law includes rules, regulations and customs governing trade between nations. International trade law is the tool used by the nation’s government for taking corrective actions against trade. International trade law focuses on applying domestic rules to international trade rules and applying treaty-based international trade law governing trade.

The body of rules for transnational trade in the 21st century was derived from medieval commercial laws called the lex mercatoria and lex maritima—respectively, "the law for merchants on land" and "the law for merchants on the sea." Modern trade law (extending beyond bilateral treaties) began shortly after the Second World War, with the negotiation of a multilateral treaty to deal with trade in goods: the General Agreement on Tariffs and Trade (GATT).

International trade law is based on theories of economic liberalism developed in Europe and later the United States from the 18th century onwards.

International Trade Law is an aggregate of legal rules of "international legislation" and new lex mercatoria, regulating relations in international trade. "International legislation" – international treaties and acts of international intergovernmental organizations regulating relations in international trade. lex mercatoria – "the law for merchants on land". Alok Narayan defines "lex mercatoria" as "any law relating to businesses" which was criticised by Professor Julius Stone. and lex maritime – "the law for merchants on sea. Alok in his recent article criticised this definition to be "too narrow" and "merely-creative". Professor Dodd and Professor Malcolm Shaw of Leeds University supported this proposition.

The Lex Mercatoria is the grouping of legal rules that guide and underlie international trade, which acts totally independently of the positive law of states, being considered normative. Currently, the new Lex Mercatoria has been prepared. The former Lex Mercatoria was generated in light of the characteristic demands of the time in question, including the values, culture, and future provisions of the time, whereas, the new one is recognized as having the responsibility of common international trade law.

== World Trade Organization ==
In 1995, the World Trade Organization, a formal international organization to regulate trade, was established.

The purposes and structure of the organization are governed by the Agreement Establishing The World Trade Organization, also known as the "Marrakesh Agreement". It does not specify the actual rules that govern international trade in specific areas. These are found in separate treaties, annexed to the Marrakesh Agreement.

The scope of WTO:

(a) provide a framework for administration and implementation of agreements; (b) forum for further negotiations; (c) trade policy review mechanism; and (d) promote greater coherence among members economics policies

Principles of the WTO:

(a) A principle of non-discrimination (most-favored-nation treatment obligation and the national treatment obligation) (b) market access (reduction of tariff and non-tariff barriers to trade) (c) balancing trade liberalization and other societal interests (d) harmonization of national regulation (TRIPS agreement, TBT agreement, SPS agreement)

== Trade in goods ==
The General Agreement on Tariffs and Trade (GATT) has been the backbone of international trade law since 1948 after the charter for international trade had been agreed upon in Havana. It contains rules relating to "unfair" trading practices—dumping and subsidies. Many things impacted GATT like the Uruguay Round and the North American Free Trade Agreement.

In 1994 the World Trade Organization (WTO) was established to take the place of the GATT. This is because the GATT was meant to be a temporary fix to trade issues, and the founders hoped for something more concrete. It took many years for this to come about, however, because of the lack of money. The British Economy was in crisis and there was not much backing from Congress to pass the new agreement.

The idea of these agreements (WTO and GATT) was to create an equal field for all countries in trade. This way all countries got something of equal value out of the trade. This was a difficult thing to do since every country has a different economy size. This led to the Trade Expansion act of 1962.

== Principles of International Trade Laws ==
- National Treatment Principle: Imported and locally-produced goods should be treated equally—at least after the foreign goods have entered the market. The same should apply to foreign and domestic services, and to foreign and local trademarks, copyrights and patents. These principles apply to trade in goods, trade in services as well as trade related aspects of intellectual property rights.
- Most Favored Nation (MFN) Principle: The MFN principles ensures that every time a WTO Member lowers a trade barrier or opens up a market, it has to do so for the like goods or services from all WTO Members, without regard of the Members’ economic size or level of development. The MFN principle requires to accord to all WTO Members any advantage given to any other country. A WTO Member could give an advantage to other WTO Members, without having to accord advantage to non- Members but only WTO Members benefit from the most favorable treatment.

== Trade and intellectual property ==
The World Trade Organization Trade-Related Aspects of Intellectual Property Rights (TRIPS) agreement required signatory nations to raise intellectual property rights (also known as intellectual monopoly privileges). This arguably has had a negative impact on access to essential medicines in some nations such as less developed countries, as the local economy is not as capable of producing more technical products such as pharmaceuticals.

== Cross-border transactions ==
Cross-border operations are subject to taxation by more than one country. Commercial activity that occurs among several jurisdictions or countries is called a cross-border transaction. Those involved in any international business development or international trade should be knowledgeable in tax law, as every country enforces different laws on foreign businesses. International tax planning ensures that cross-border businesses stay tax compliant and avoid or lessen double taxation.

== Dispute settlement ==
Most prominent in the area of dispute settlement in international trade law is the WTO dispute settlement system. The WTO dispute settlement body is operational since 1995 and has been very active since then with 369 cases in the time between 1 January 1995 and 1 December 2007. Nearly a quarter of disputes reached an amicable solution, in other cases the parties to the dispute resorted to adjudication. The WTO dispute settlement body has exclusive and compulsory jurisdiction over disputes on WTO law (Article 23.1 Dispute Settlement Understanding).

== See also ==
- Case law
- International trade
- World Trade Organization
