= Alejandro Jara =

World Trade Organization official

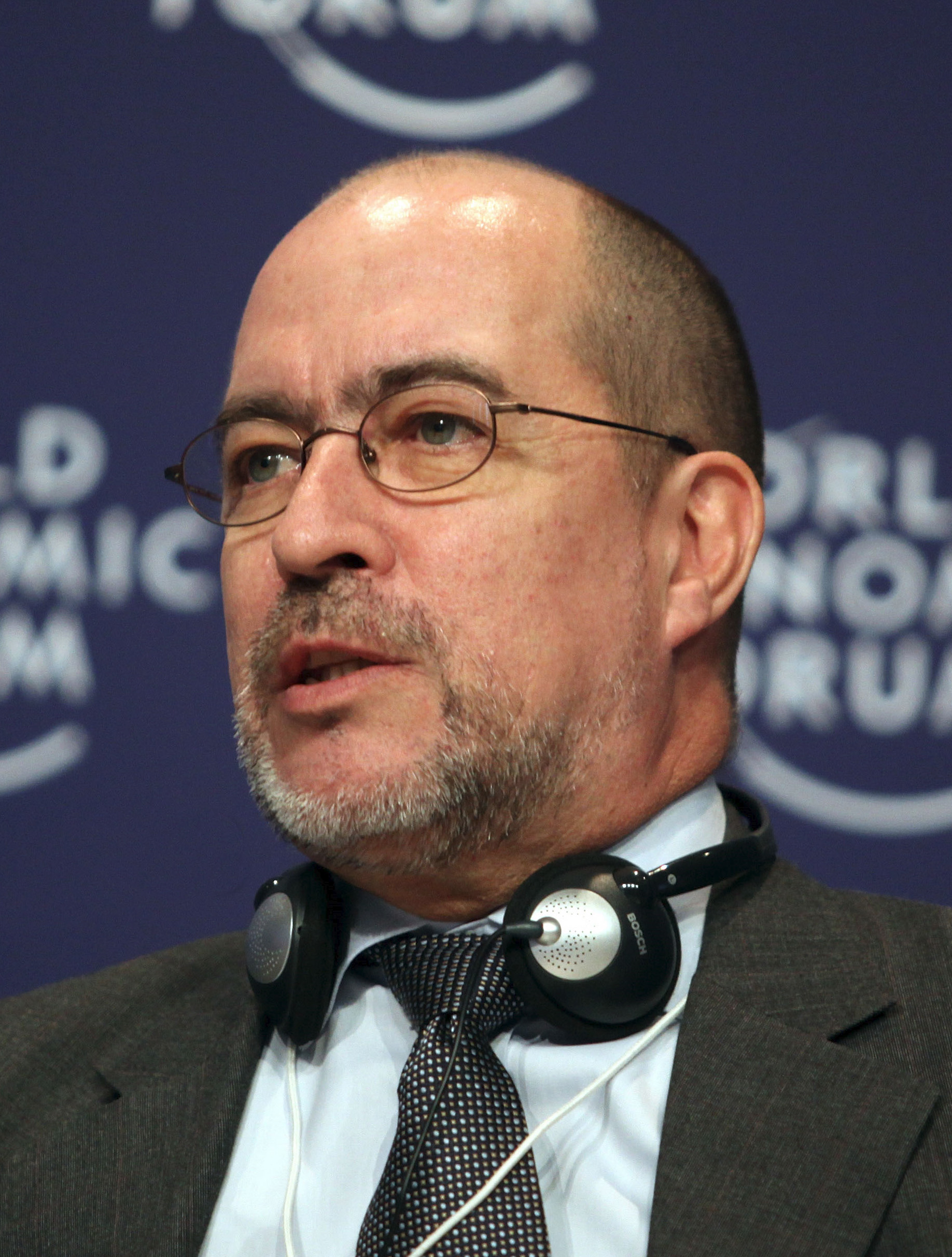
Alejandro Jara (2009).

Alejandro Jara (born 1949 in Santiago, Chile) was a Deputy Director-General of the World Trade Organization (WTO). He served in this position from 2005 to 2013. His career began in 1976 when he joined the Foreign Service of Chile to primarily focus on international economic relations. From 1979 to 1984, he served in the Delegation of Chile to the General Agreement on Tariffs and Trade (GATT) and was seconded to the Economic System for Latin America (SELA) in Caracas as Coordinator for Trade Policy Affairs. He was appointed Director for Bilateral Economic Affairs in 1993 and Director for Multilateral Economic Affairs in 1994. From 1996 to 1997, he was also Chile's senior official to the Asia-Pacific Economic Cooperation (APEC) and Deputy Chief Negotiator for the Chile-Canada Free Trade Agreement and Chile-Mexico Free Trade Agreement. In 1999, he was designated Director General for International Economic Relations. He was appointed in 2000 as Ambassador, Permanent Representative of Chile to the World Trade Organization in Geneva. From 2000 to 2005 he held various diplomatic and ministerial positions, including Chairperson of the Committee on Trade and Environment of the WTO in 2001 and Chairman of the Special Session of the Council for Trade in Services in 2002. He has written a variety of papers on international trade. Currently he works as Of Counsel of the Chilean Law Firm Vásquez Urra Abogados, Santiago, Chile.
