= Journal of International Economic Law =

International economic law journal

- Language: English

Standard abbreviations
- Bluebook: J. Int'l Econ. L.
- ISO 4: Find out here

Indexing
- ISSN: 1369-3034 (print); 1464-3758 (web)

Links
- Journal homepage

The Journal of International Economic Law, published by the Oxford University Press, is one of the most highly cited international law journals in the world. The journal publishes on topics of international economic law, broadly conceived. It was formerly edited by John H. Jackson. Currently Kathleen Claussen (Georgetown Law), Sergio Puig (European University Institute), and Michael Waibel (University of Vienna) are editors-in-chief.

According to the Journal Citation Reports, the journal has a 2024 impact factor of 2.6.
