= International economic law =

Field of international law

International economic law is a field of international law that governs the regulation and conduct of states and international organizations. This field encompasses public international law, private international law, and domestic law relevant to international business transactions.

== Overview and scope ==
This field sets the framework for international business operations, evolving over the years. The interdisciplinary nature of international economic law means that changes in one area impact others. Alterations in financial regulation affect international trade flows, and shifts in environmental law can influence investment policies.

The scope of international economic law is vast, including laws such as international trade law, financial regulation, labor and services law, and environmental law.

== Principles ==
The foundational principles of international economic law are traced to economic theories, such as those proposed by Adam Smith in his work The Wealth of Nations and Karl Marx's critique of political economy in Das Kapital.

== See also ==
- Journal of International Economic Law
- International Economics
