= 1960s in Hong Kong =

1960s in Hong Kong continued with the development and expansion of manufacturing that began in the previous decade. The economic progress made in the period would categorise Hong Kong as one of Four Asian Tigers along with Singapore, South Korea, and Taiwan.

== Background ==
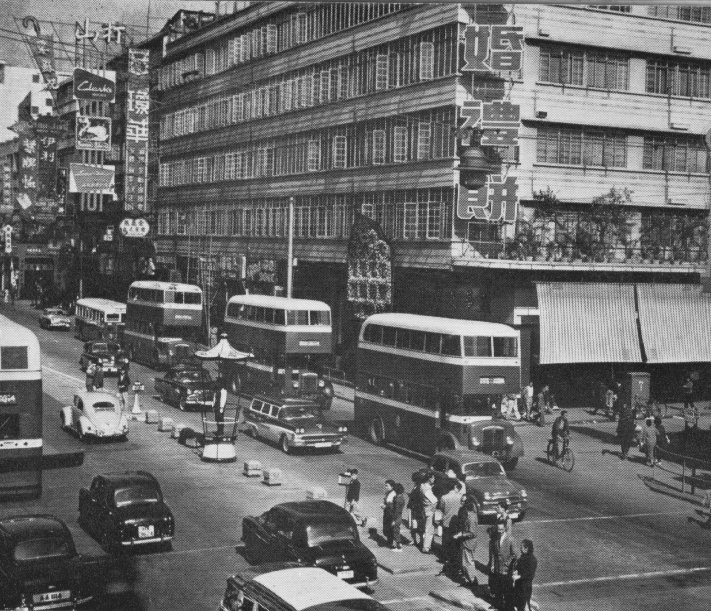
Nathan Road, Kowloon 1960

Economically, this era is considered a major stepping stone for Hong Kong. It is considered the first turning point for Hong Kong's economy. The per capita GDP was still relatively low in 1960, approximately being the same as Peru, South Africa and Greece in the same decade. By comparison, Argentina had two times and Venezuela had three times the GDP of Hong Kong. The living standard was rising steadily, but low wages continued. The number of registered factories increased from 3,000 in 1950s to 10,000 in 1960s. Registered foreign companies increased from 300 to 500. There were demands for labour in every sector of the economy.

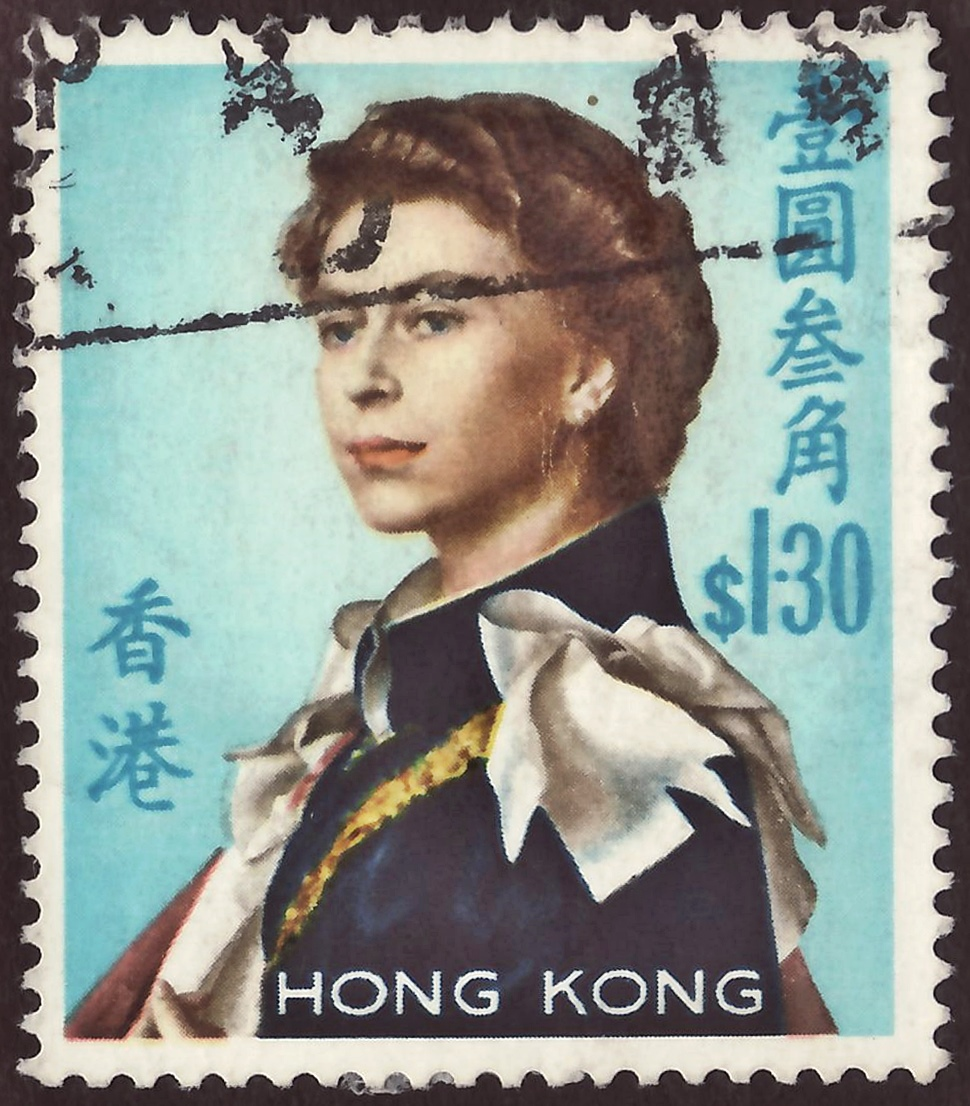
1962 stamp with portrait of Queen Elizabeth II

Politically, however, this era is marked by the political chaos in the People's Republic of China.

== Demographics ==
=== Population ===
Hong Kong's population in the 1960s is estimated at 3 million. Half of the population was under the age of 25 and the group became Hong Kong's baby boom generation. The surge of refugees continued to come in from China.

== Culture ==
=== Lifestyle ===
The past generations of Chinese families were deeply rooted in family affairs. The long hours in the factories would break apart that traditional structure when most people spend far more time working in factories than at home. But people lived under a strong willingness to bear sufferings. This was slightly compensated by their close relationship within the community, and cheerful talks in their spare times. Work places mainly served as educational hubs or the "second home". Women also joined the work force in larger numbers, becoming working daughters or working mothers.

=== Education ===
The government pursued an ambitious public education programme, creating over 300,000 new primary school places between 1954 and 1961. By 1966, 99.8% of school-age children were attending primary school, though the primary schools were not free.

=== Events ===
From 6 to 15 December 1969, the first Hong Kong Festival was launched after 7 months of preparation work with HKD $4 million of funding. It originated after the 1967 riots in hopes that people unleash their energy toward a better cause instead of communists' riots. The number of participants reached more than 500,000 including foreign tourists.

=== Entertainment ===
TVB logo in 1967

The 1960s cinema films were still rooted in a Chinese tradition, though Hong Kong would have one of their first pop culture teen idols, Connie Chan Po-chu. The arrival of broadcast television would become the first format brewed in Hong Kong to be marketed toward the people of Hong Kong directly. TVB station was founded in 1967 and made the first free-over-the-air broadcast.

=== Law and order ===
The first disturbance in the 1960s was the Hong Kong 1966 riots over the rising fares of the Star Ferry. A petition was created with 20,000 signatures in protest against any increases in transportation costs. The result led to the arrest of 1,800 people, but the end came swiftly.

Other riots include the Hong Kong 1967 riots which began when internal conflict within the Chinese Communist Party resulted in the Cultural Revolution. Pro-communist leftists in Hong Kong challenged British rule. Demonstrations were held, the red guards would take shape in Hong Kong carrying Quotations from Chairman Mao Zedong in their left hands shouting communist slogans. The People's Daily in Beijing ran editorials supporting the leftist struggle. Rumors spread that China was preparing to take over the colony. Political tension soared. The riots only came to an end in December 1967 when Chinese Premier Zhou Enlai ordered the leftist groups in Hong Kong to stop. After the riot, the government made an effort to clean up any existing communist networks. The radio host Lam Bun was also murdered.

=== Natural disasters ===
==== Drought ====
In 1963 and 1967, serious droughts affected Hong Kong. Water supply was unable to support the needs of the rapid population growth. The government introduced a water restriction policy. There were periods when water supply was restricted to 4 hours per 4 days. People had to save water for 4 days of usage. Water shortages, however, were mainly created by the politics (see resource section).

The severe drought year in 1963 has been attributed to air circulation changes resulting from the March-May eruption of the Agung volcano on the Indonesian island of Bali.

==== Typhoon ====
In 1960, Typhoon Mary affected Hong Kong, causing 45 deaths and 127 injuries. It also destroyed about 10,000 homes.

In 1962, Typhoon Wanda affected Hong Kong, causing 130 deaths. 72,000 people were left homeless. It was one of the most disastrous typhoons to ever affect Hong Kong.

== Economy ==
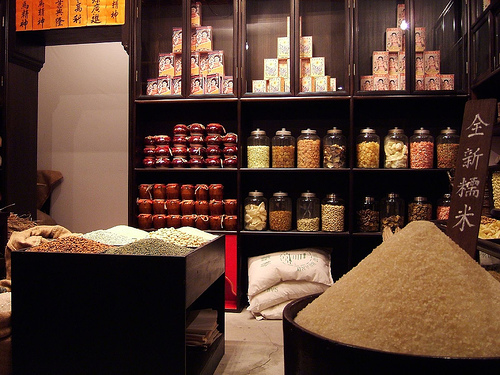
Old style rice shops (米舖) in the 1960s that were situated in Gaai si

=== Banking ===
At the time, Hong Kong faced financial instability with several major bank runs, leading to an economic crisis. In 1961, a run on Liu Chong Hing Bank lasted several days until the Hongkong Bank and Chartered Bank intervened. A more severe crisis erupted in early 1965, beginning with Ming Tak Bank and spreading to Canton Trust, Hang Seng Bank, and several other Chinese-owned banks. Governor David Trench imposed daily withdrawal limits of 100 dollars, and the Hongkong Bank acquired a majority stake in Hang Seng to restore stability. In February 1965, Ming Tak Bank collapsed, and the Canton Trust failed to reopen, later collapsing in May. Many Hongkongers lost their savings.

=== Construction ===
The construction business would also continue to increase along with the demand of highways, buildings, tunnels, and reservoirs. In 1962, the director of public works questioned where to go after the development of Kwai Chung and Tsuen Wan. The construction expansion went west to Tuen Mun and north to Sha Tin. The first post-World War II documentation to provide detailed information about the territory came in 1969 in a guide titled the "Colony Outline Plan". It was the first paperwork to outline strategies to house a million people with low-cost public housing, along with defining tight regulations and guidelines on how to construct among the high density population.

=== Manufacturing ===
While many companies were beginning to diversify in the products it manufactures, the entire success of the Hong Kong colony rested on the textile industry. An estimated 625,000 residents were supported directly or indirectly by this one industry. The government was depending on its Shanghai entrepreneurs and the industry collectively ran in 3 shifts around the clock. It was from this point that the cheap low-grade products became high-quality products with the "Made in Hong Kong" label. By 1968, small factories employing fewer than 100 workers accounted for 42 percent of Hong Kong's domestic exports to the UK, amounting to HKD $1.2 billion.

=== Hospital and hospitality ===
From 1960 to 1965, the executive council tried to revamp the medical system to provide some form of low cost health care directly or indirectly to large sections of the population. Staff at the medical and health departments were outlining proposals to estimate demands for the next 15 years. The Hong Kong Flu of 1968 would infect 15% of the population.

During the beginning of the Vietnam War, the U.S. made Hong Kong a frequent stop for resting troops in the Asian region. It was considered one of the neutral zones not affected by the communists despite all the political riots taking place.

=== Resource ===
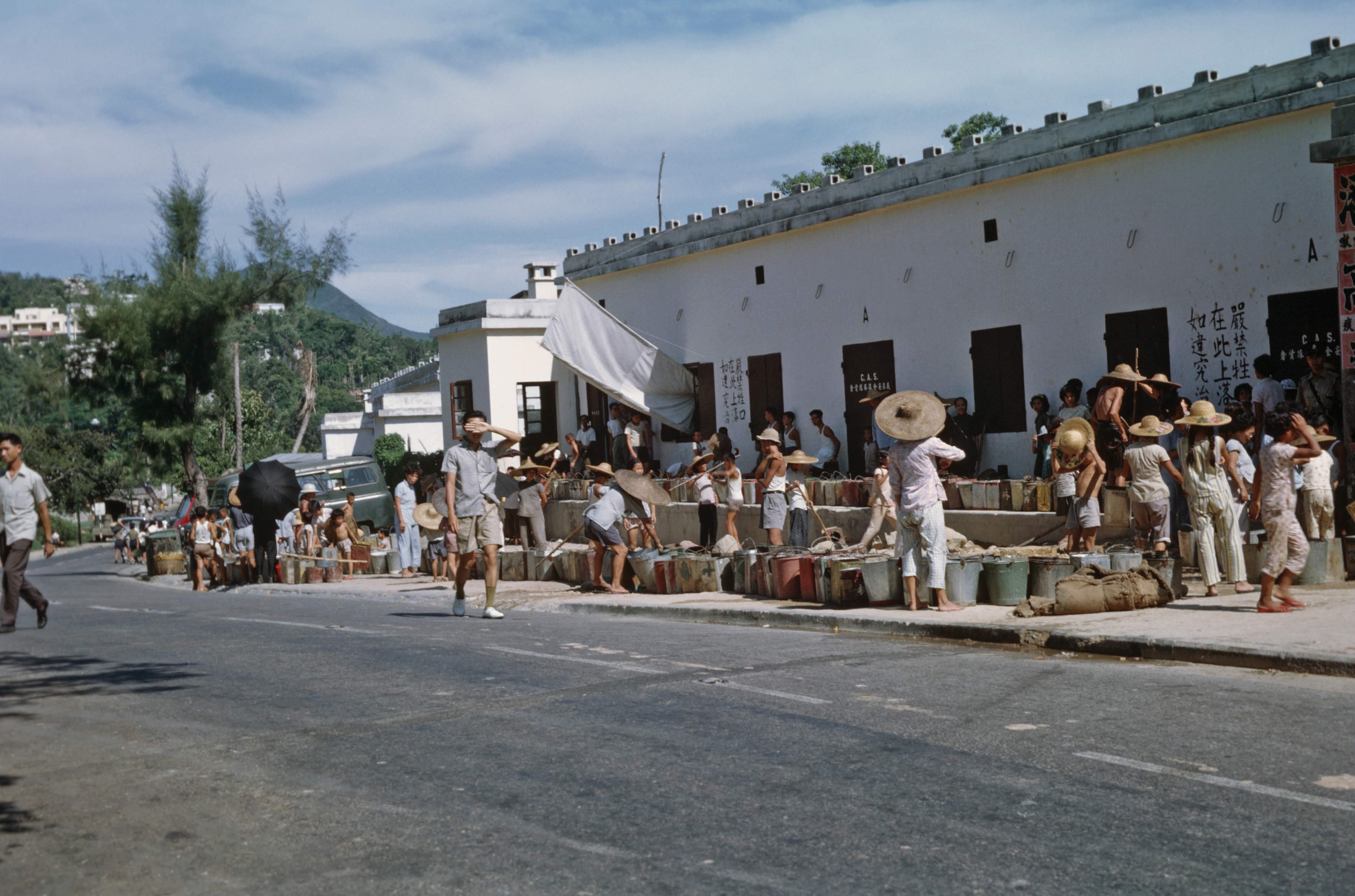
Queuing for water in Hong Kong July 1963

The main source of water in Hong Kong was China. A contract was signed in 1964 when Hong Kong purchased 15,000 gallons of water a day drawn from China's East river. When political turmoil came to Hong Kong, China turned off the supply periodically and caused water shortages. Rationing was imposed by the government.
