= Tyrer =

Tyrer is a surname. Notable people with the surname include:

- Alan Tyrer (1942–2008), English professional footballer
- Anderson Tyrer (1893–1962), English concert pianist and orchestra conductor
- Arthur Tyrer (born 1931), English former footballer
- Christian Tyrer (born 1973), English former rugby league and rugby union footballer
- Edward Tyrer (1917-2004), a senior British colonial police officer and Commissioner of Police, Hong Kong
- Hayyim Tyrer (died 1813), rabbi
- Jim Tyrer (1939-1980), American football player
- Steve Tyrer (born 1989), English rugby league player
