= Henry Heath (police officer) =

British police officer (1912–2002)

Henry Heath CMG QPM CPM

Commissioner of Police of British Hong Kong
- In office 1959–1967
- Preceded by: Arthur Maxwell
- Succeeded by: Edward Tyrer

Personal details
- Born: 18 March 1912
- Died: 29 July 2002 (aged 90)
- Children: 3
- Occupation: Colonial police officer

Henry Wylde Edwards Heath (18 March 1912 – 29 July 2002) was a British colonial police officer who served as Commissioner of Police of British Hong Kong from 1959 to 1967.

== Early life and education ==
Heath was born in Montserrat in the British West Indies on 18 March 1912, the son of Dr W. G. Heath. He was educated at Dean Close School in Cheltenham, and at the naval training school, HMS Conway.

== Career ==
After deciding not to pursue a career in the Navy, Heath left the naval training school before completing his studies, and returned to the Leeward Islands where he joined the colonial police service. After undergoing police training in Northern Ireland, he was appointed an inspector in 1931, and posted to Antigua.

In 1935, Heath was appointed assistant superintendent, went to British Hong Kong, and then spent two years learning Cantonese as a "language cadet" travelling throughout southern China, before returning to Hong Kong. In 1940, he went to Lahore for further training with the Punjab police force, and became fluent in Urdu. In 1941, he returned to Hong Kong as officer commanding the Eastern division. Ten days after his arrival the Japanese invaded the colony, and he was incarcerated there by the Japanese army.

After the Japanese surrender in 1945, Heath became head of the Police Training School with the rank of superintendent, and then took charge of the Kowloon and New Territories District. In 1950, he was appointed assistant commissioner and head of the CID. At the time, Hong Kong was faced with serious societal challenges, and Heath had to deal with a surge in illegal immigration resulting from the civil war in China and subsequent social problems, as well as drug trafficking, and warfare between the triads. In 1953, following the Shek Kip Mei fire, 58,000 squatters were made homeless, and three years later serious political rioting, known as the Double Ten riots, broke out in the colony.

In 1959, he was appointed Commissioner of Police of Hong Kong, and two years later was faced with a further influx of migrants from China. In what was described as his first major test as commissioner, Heath oversaw the detention of thousands of illegal immigrants and their return to China. In his final year as commissioner, he had to tackle more rioting which broke out in Kowloon, known as the Star Ferry Riots, which lasted several days.

Heath retired in 1967 to Sussex. Described by The Times as a "stalwart commissioner who led Hong Kong's police through difficult times", his retirement was "well earned and his service recognised by his appointment as CMG."

== Personal life and death ==
Heath married Joan Mildred Critchett in 1945, and they had two sons and one daughter.

Heath died on 29 July 2002, aged 90.

== Honours ==
Heath was appointed Companion of the Order of St Michael and St George (CMG) in the 1963 Birthday Honours. He was awarded the Queen's Police Medal (QPM) in the 1957 Birthday Honours, and the Overseas Territories Police Medal (CPM) in the 1953 Coronation Honours.
