= Lam Bun =

Hong Kong radio commentator (1929–1967)

- Born: Lam Siu-po; 24 September 1929; Guangzhou, Guangdong, China
- Died: 25 August 1967 (aged 37); Queen Elizabeth Hospital, King’s Park, Kowloon, British Hong Kong
- Occupation: Radio commentator

Chinese name
- Chinese: 林彬
Transcriptions
Standard Mandarin
- Hanyu Pinyin: Lín Bīn
Yue: Cantonese
- Yale Romanization: Làhm Bān
- Jyutping: Lam^{4} Ban^{1}

Birth name
- Chinese: 林少波
Transcriptions
Standard Mandarin
- Hanyu Pinyin: Lín Shǎobō
Yue: Cantonese
- Yale Romanization: Làhm Síu-bō
- Jyutping: Lam^{4} Siu^{2}-bo^{1}

Lam Bun (Chinese: 林彬; 24 September 1929 – 25 August 1967) was a radio commentator at Commercial Radio Hong Kong. During the 1967 Hong Kong riots, he fiercely criticised leftist activities and was assassinated, becoming an icon of freedom of speech in Hong Kong.

== Biography ==
Lam was born Lam Siu-po (林少波) in 1929.

In the 1960s he worked as a radio commentator at Commercial Radio Hong Kong, which was fiercely critical of leftists. During the 1967 riots, Lam criticised the leftist rioters on his own radio programmes. He created a programme called Can't Stop Striking (欲罷不能) to satirise the leftists, leading some leftist newspapers at the time to label him as a "traitor" and an "imperialist running dog".

=== Death ===
On 24 August 1967, while Lam was en route to work, men posing as road maintenance workers stopped his vehicle at the end of the street where he lived. They blocked his car doors and doused Lam and his cousin with petrol. They were both then set on fire and burned alive. Lam died later that day in a hospital; his cousin died several days later. A leftist group reportedly claimed responsibility for the assassination.

No one was ever arrested, although it was believed that Yeung Kwong, then chairman of the Federation of Trade Unions (FTU) and director of the Anti-British Struggle Committee, ordered the murder. However, pro-Beijing politicians said in 2010 that leftists should not be blamed for Lam's death. The founder of Commercial Radio Hong Kong, George Ho, launched the programme 18/F, Block C in his memory.

Immediately after Lam Bun's death, most of the Chinese and English newspapers in Hong Kong condemned the killing as despicable and inhuman. On the other hand, the pro-communist leftist newspaper, Ta Kung Pao, published several articles, condemning Lam Bun but not the murderers. For example, one of the articles titled "地下突擊隊鋤奸, 敗類林彬受重傷", which may be translated into English as "An underground special tactic unit had crushed the villain. The antagonist, Lam Bun, was seriously wounded". Another article in the same newspaper published on the same day described the murder as a "punishment that Lam Bun had deserved" (突擊隊懲戒林彬).

The Lam Bun assassination angered the people of Hong Kong, eventually leading the government of Hong Kong to suppress the riots. Lam became an icon of free speech. The police offered a reward of HK$50,000, on top of which his employers added HK$100,000, making it the highest reward ever posted in the colony.

== 2001 GBM controversy ==
In 2001, Yeung Kwong was awarded the highest honour Grand Bauhinia Medal by Tung Chee-hwa. Critics in Hong Kong felt that it was inappropriate to award a riot leader who encouraged the violence which led to Lam's murder.

== 2010 Commercial Radio controversy ==
In May 2010, after the pro-Beijing Democratic Alliance for the Betterment of Hong Kong (DAB) had sponsored a political radio programme on Commercial Radio, pro-democracy activists protested outside the station with images of Lam, complaining that the station had desecrated the memory of Lam, and all the station had stood for. Activists said they had requested an interview to talk about Lam's death. The station later said it respected freedom of speech; the DAB said the shows were about livelihood issues, and denied they promoted a political stance.

Two DAB lawmakers stepped into the row: Chan Kam-lam said: "During the '67 riots, it was not just Lam Bun who died. There were very many ordinary citizens who, we don't know for what reason, died ..." Wong Ting-kwong also said leftists should not be held responsible. Pro-democracy lawmaker Lee Cheuk-yan said the DAB were revisionists who "would rather people not talk about their inglorious past." Wong later clarified his comments, saying he had been misunderstood because the phrase 'leftist camp' had different definitions. He said that there was no evidence that Yeung Kwong or the FTU killed Lam Bun. He blamed the media for sensationalising his comments ahead of the 16 May by-election.

== See also ==
- List of unsolved murders (1900–1979)
- 1981 Hong Kong riots
