= 1981 riots =

1981 riots may refer to:

- 1981 England riots
  - 1981 Brixton riot
  - 1981 Chapeltown riots
  - 1981 Handsworth riots
  - 1981 Moss Side riot
  - 1981 Toxteth riots
- 1981 Hong Kong riots
