= Stock market crashes in Hong Kong =

A number of stock market crashes have occurred in the Hong Kong stock market since the 1960s:

1960s

- Stock disaster in 1965 (Canton Trust Bank run)
- Stock disaster in 1967 (1967 Hong Kong riots)

1970s

- Stock disaster in 1973 (1973–1974 stock market crash)

1980s

- Stock disaster in 1983 (Negotiation deadlock between China and United Kingdom on Handover of Hong Kong)
- Stock disaster in 1987 (Black Monday)
- Stock disaster in 1989 (Tiananmen Square protests)

1990s

- Bear market from 1997 to 1998 (Asian financial crisis)

2000s

- Stock disaster in 2000 (Dot-com bubble)
- Stock disaster in 2003 (SARS crisis)
- Stock disaster in 2007, 2008, 2009 (Great Recession)

2010s

- Stock disaster in 2011 (2011 United States debt-ceiling crisis)
- Stock disaster in 2015, 2016 (2015–2016 Chinese stock market turbulence) and (2016 United Kingdom European Union membership referendum)

== See also ==
- Stock market crash
- Hong Kong Stock Exchange
