= Arthur Maxwell (police officer) =

British police officer (1909–1964)

Arthur Maxwell CMG
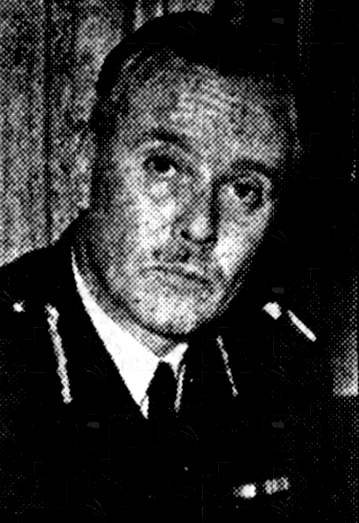

Commissioner of Police of British Hong Kong
- In office 1953–1959
- Preceded by: Duncan William McIntosh
- Succeeded by: Henry Wylde Edwards Heath

Personal details
- Born: 25 May 1909
- Died: 11 May 1964 (aged 54) Belfast
- Children: 2
- Occupation: Colonial police officer

Arthur Crawford Maxwell (25 May 1909 – 11 May 1964) was a British colonial police officer who served as Commissioner of Police of British Hong Kong from 1953 to 1959.

== Early life and education ==
Maxwell was born on 25 May 1909, the son of Rev. Robert Maxwell of Belfast. He was educated at Methodist College Belfast.

== Career ==
Maxwell joined colonial police service of the Straits Settlements in 1928 as a police probationer, and in the following year transferred to the Federated Malay States Police as a probationary assistant commissioner. In 1929, he was sent from Kuala Lumpur to Port Swettenham as OCPD (Officer in Charge of Police District). In 1931, after promotion to assistant commissioner of police, he was transferred to Kuala Selangor. In 1934, he went to Lower Perak as OSPC (Officer Superintending Police Circle), then to Teluk Anson and Sungei Petani, before he returned to Kuala Lumpur in 1938. The following year he was transferred to the intelligence department in Kuala Lumpur, rose to the rank of superintendent, and was additionally appointed registrar of criminals of the Straits Settlements and the Federated Malay States. During the Japanese occupation of Malaya he was interned in Singapore from 1942 to 1945.

After the war Maxwell returned to Malaya in 1946 as chief of police of Kedah, and then in the following year was sent for two years on secondment to the Sarawak constabulary as commissioner of police. In 1949, he transferred to Hong Kong as deputy commissioner of police, and in 1953 was promoted to the substantive position of commissioner of police of the British colony, a post he held until 1959.

After retiring from the service, he worked at the Royal Society for the Prevention of Accidents of Northern Ireland from 1960 to 1963.

== Personal life and death ==
Maxwell married Edith Phrena Ramplen-Jones in St Andrew's church, Kuala Lumpur in 1933, and they had a son and a daughter.

Maxwell died on 11 May 1964 in Belfast, aged 54.

== Honours ==
Maxwell was appointed Companion of the Order of St Michael and St George (CMG) in the 1956 Birthday Honours. He was awarded the King's Police Medal in the 1952 Birthday Honours.
