= 1966 Hong Kong riots =

Riots over increased ferry fares in Hong Kong in 1966

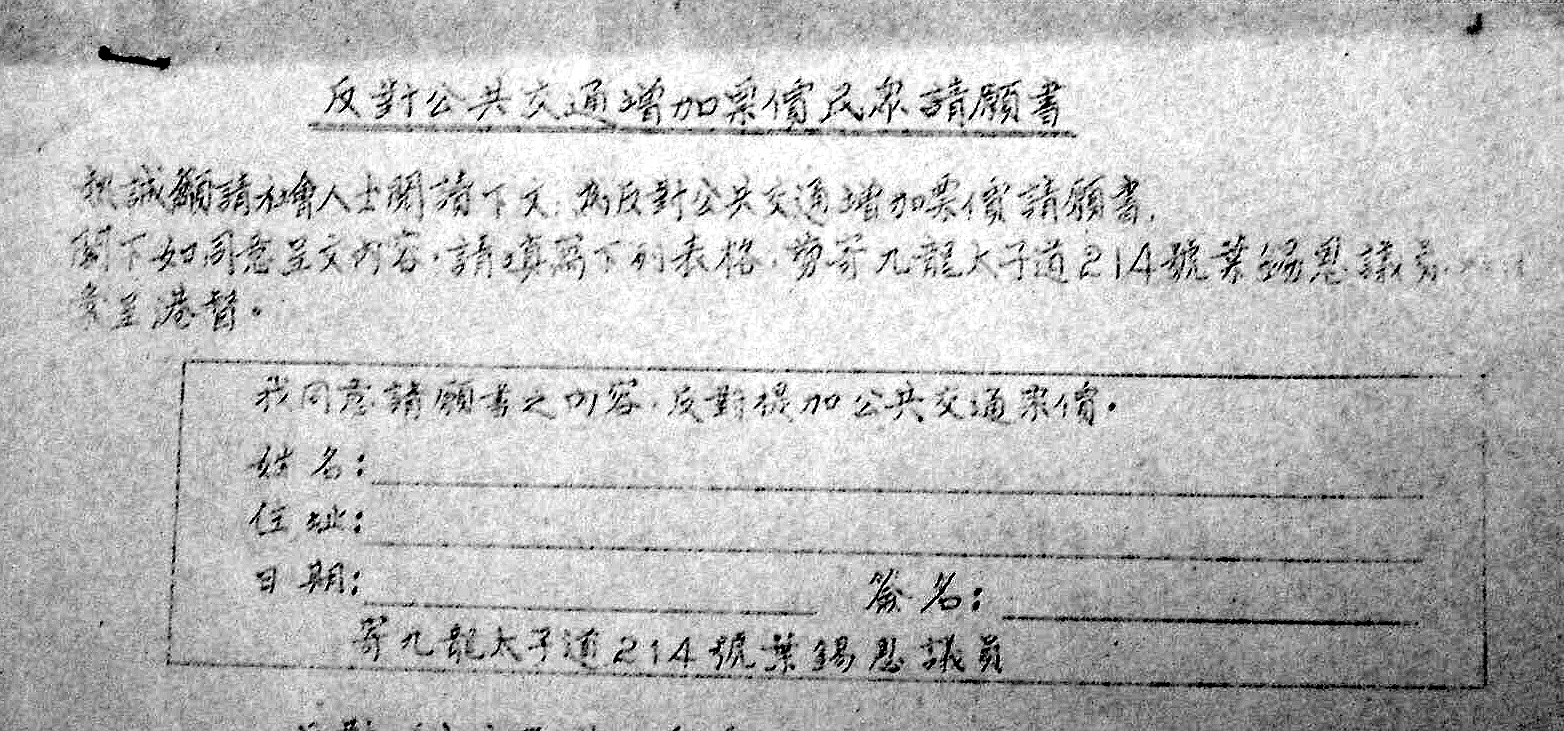
- Petition form created by Elsie Elliot against the Star Ferry fare increase
- Date: 4–8 April 1966
- Location: Kowloon, Hong Kong
- Caused by: Ferry fare increase

Casualties
- Deaths: 1
- Injuries: Dozens
- Arrested: 1,800+

The 1966 Hong Kong riots, also known as the 1966 Star Ferry riots, were a series of disturbances that took place over four nights on the streets of Kowloon, Hong Kong in the spring of 1966. The riots started as peaceful demonstrations against the British colonial government's decision to increase the fare of Star Ferry foot-passenger harbour.

One person died in the riots, dozens were injured, and over 1,800 people were arrested.

== Background ==
=== 1960s ===
During the 1960s, Hong Kong remained underdeveloped, with many low-income workers earning just a few dollars daily. At the time, Hong Kong also faced financial instability with several major bank runs, leading to an economic crisis. In 1961, a run on Liu Chong Hing Bank lasted several days until the Hongkong Bank and Chartered Bank intervened. A more severe crisis erupted in early 1965, beginning with Ming Tak Bank and spreading to Canton Trust, Hang Seng Bank, and several other Chinese-owned banks. Governor David Trench imposed daily withdrawal limits of 100 dollars, and the Hongkong Bank acquired a majority stake in Hang Seng to restore stability. In February 1965, Ming Tak Bank collapsed, and the Canton Trust fails to reopen, later collapsed in May. Many Hongkongers lost their savings. The crisis led to widespread distrust in the government and corporations.

=== Fare raise ===
The Star Ferry was an important link between the Kowloon Peninsula and Hong Kong Island before the Cross-Harbour Tunnel was built in 1972. On 1 October 1965, the Star Ferry applied for 10 cents fare increase for first-class seats and 2 dollars monthly ticket fare increase, up to 10 dollars. Star Ferry, which considered this a secret, expressed dismay that the application had been made public. It was further revealed that Star Ferry had solicited the views of the Hongkong and Yaumati Ferry on the increase sought. This sparked public fears that if the increase in fares were approved, and prompting other forms of public transport to also raise prices.

When the Transport Advisory Committee (TAC) approved Star Ferry's fare increase in March 1966, Elsie Elliot, an Urban Councillor and dissenting member of the TAC, created a petition against the fare increase and collected the signatures of 20,000 citizens.

A peaceful and rational protest was conducted by two participants. However, it was severely suppressed by the Hong Kong Government. The public was outraged.

=== Underlying cause ===
The 1960s was a period of mounting dissatisfaction over British colonial rule. Living and working conditions of the general population were poor, and corruption in officialdom was prevalent. Citizens were distrustful of the rampantly corrupt police, and the inequity of policing.

== Protests ==
=== Demonstrations ===
4 April 1966

So's back, showing writing on the jacket

In the morning of 4 April, So Sau-chung (蘇守忠), a 27-year-old man who worked as a translator, began a hunger strike protest alone at the Star Ferry Terminal in Central District. So wore a black jacket upon which he had hand-written the words "Hail Elsie", "Join hunger strike to block fare increase". He caught the public mood and quickly drew a crowd of supporters.

5 April 1966

Another man, Lo Kei (盧麒), joined So in the hunger strike. At 16:10, the Hong Kong Police arrested So Sau-chung on the charges of obstruction of passageway. A group of young "sympathisers" went to Government House to petition the Governor, David Trench.

That evening, over 1,000 people gathered in Tsim Sha Tsui, demonstrating against So's arrest and the government's support for the Star Ferry company's fare increase. Demonstrators marched to Mong Kok, and back again to Tsim Sha Tsui.

=== Escalation ===
6 April 1966

So was put on trial in the Western Magistrates' Court, and was sentenced to two months' imprisonment.

Crowds started gathering at around 8 pm, and violence broke out among the protesters in Kowloon about two hours later. On the busy thoroughfare Nathan Road, mobs threw stones at buses and set vehicles on fire. The Yau Ma Tei Police Station was also attacked by a crowd of over 300 people. Riot police fired tear gas in response, but people continued to gather in Nathan Road, with the mob almost doubling in size once Hong Kong's cinemas closed at midnight.

The rioters looted shops, and attacked and set fire to public facilities including fire stations and power stations. Riot police continued to fire tear gas into the crowds and in some cases fired their carbines at looters. During that night, 772 tear gas canisters, 62 wooden shells and 62 carbine rounds were fired.

The British Hong Kong Garrison was also called into action. Members of the garrison with bayonets fixed patrolled the streets in Kowloon enforcing a curfew that was imposed after around 01:30.

7 April 1966

The next day the government announced that the curfew would start earlier, at 7 pm, and warned that any rioters risked being shot. But that night rioters still gathered on Nathan Road near Mong Kok. Again, vehicles were set on fire and shops looted. Hundreds of people attempted, unsuccessfully, to set fire to the Yau Ma Tei and Mong Kok Police stations.

During the course of the evening, 280 rounds of teargas and 218 baton rounds were used by security forces. One protester was killed, four injured, and 215 arrests were made.

8 April 1966

The next day the government announced that the curfew would start early at 7 pm, and warned that any rioters risked being shot. There were huge queues for public transport when workers went home early, and the city was like a ghost town one hour before the curfew. Some 3,500 police were out patrolling the streets. There were some incidents of stone-throwing in Chungking Mansions and Nam Cheong Street in Sham Shui Po. Raids by plain-clothes police culminated in the arrest of 669 'agitators'.

== Aftermath ==
Some 300 people were brought before the courts, and 258 people received sentences of up to two years' imprisonment. The riots began to die down, and by 10 April the curfew was lifted. The fare increase was approved on 26 April. Damage caused was estimated to be no less than HK$20 million.

After the riot, the colonial government of David Trench set up the Kowloon Disturbances Commission of Inquiry, presided over by Justice Michael Hogan, aimed at identifying the cause, in particular, the social elements that underlay the outbreak of violence. The inquiry report cited one of the main reasons was the general lack of a sense of belonging to society of young people, general insecurity and distrust of the government among grass-roots; all of this was exacerbated by economic recession, unemployment and a housing shortage. The inquiry recommended the Trench government to create the function of district officers (民政事務專員) to improve governance by facilitating communication between the government and the local public. The findings were however derided as "a farce" by Elsie Elliot.

Lo Kei was arrested after the event, allegedly for theft. In January 1967, he was found hanged in an apartment in Ngau Tau Kok. Officially, his death was recorded as a suicide, but Elliot and So challenged the verdict. So, and a few others, staged a protest in Mong Kok until April when So was arrested and sentenced to Castle Peak Psychiatric Hospital for 14 days.

== Implications ==
The 1966 riots marked the birth of civic activism in Hong Kong. It is the first large-scale social movement in Hong Kong with huge number of young people participation. It also reflected widespread social discontent that eventually led to the territory-wide pro-CCP riots in 1967.

The Edinburgh Place Star Ferry pier, where the riots originated, was included in the controversial Central waterfront redevelopment project in 2007. Many protesters linked their demonstration against the demolition of the pier with So's action.

== See also ==
- 1956 Hong Kong riots
- 1967 Hong Kong riots
- 1981 Hong Kong riots
- 2014 Hong Kong protests
- 2016 Mong Kok civil unrest
- 2019–2020 Hong Kong protests
