= Duncan Macintosh =

British police officer (1904–1966)

Duncan William Macintosh CMG, OBE
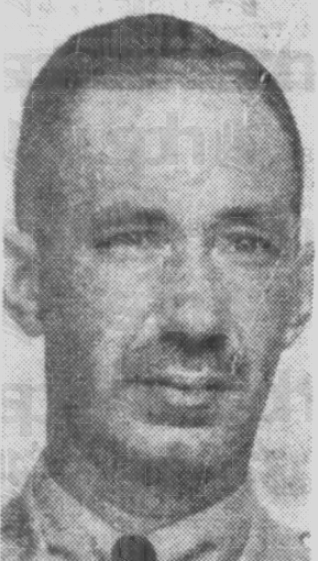
- Born: 5 May 1904; Scotland
- Died: 14 September 1966 (aged 62)
- Predecessor: Charles Henry Sansom
- Successor: James Arthur Maxwell

Duncan William Macintosh CMG OBE (Chinese: 麥景陶; Scotland, 5 May 1904 - 14 September 1966) He was the first Commissioner of Police in Hong Kong after World War II, in office from 1946 to 1954. Before arriving in Hong Kong in 1946, he previously served in Irish and Colonial Malayan Police Forces, and was the Commissioner of Singapore Police Force before World War II. During World War II, he became a prisoner of war and was held in a concentration camp in Singapore by the Imperial Japanese Army.

== Honours ==
- Companion of the Order of St Michael and St George (CMG)
- Officer of the Order of the British Empire (OBE)

== Anecdotes ==
- Macintosh Forts is named after by him, the forts is located in the boundary of Hong Kong and China.
- The formal wear of the bagpipe band in the Hong Kong Police Band is part of Macintosh's Scottish family ancestry.
