= Ching Wah Street =

Street in Hong Kong

Coordinates: 22°17′20″N 114°11′53″E

Ching Wah Street (Chinese: 清華街) is a street in North Point in Hong Kong. The short, primarily residential, street runs from west to east, parallel to King's Road, at a higher elevation, just behind St. Jude's Church. It is the location of Kiangsu and Chekiang Primary School and Eng Yu Evangelistic Mission Hong Kong Church.

== History ==
During the 1967 riots, a bomb exploded in Ching Wah Street, killing two young children. It was one of 15 bombs that exploded during the disturbances, which lasted from April to December that year.

== See also ==
- List of streets and roads in Hong Kong
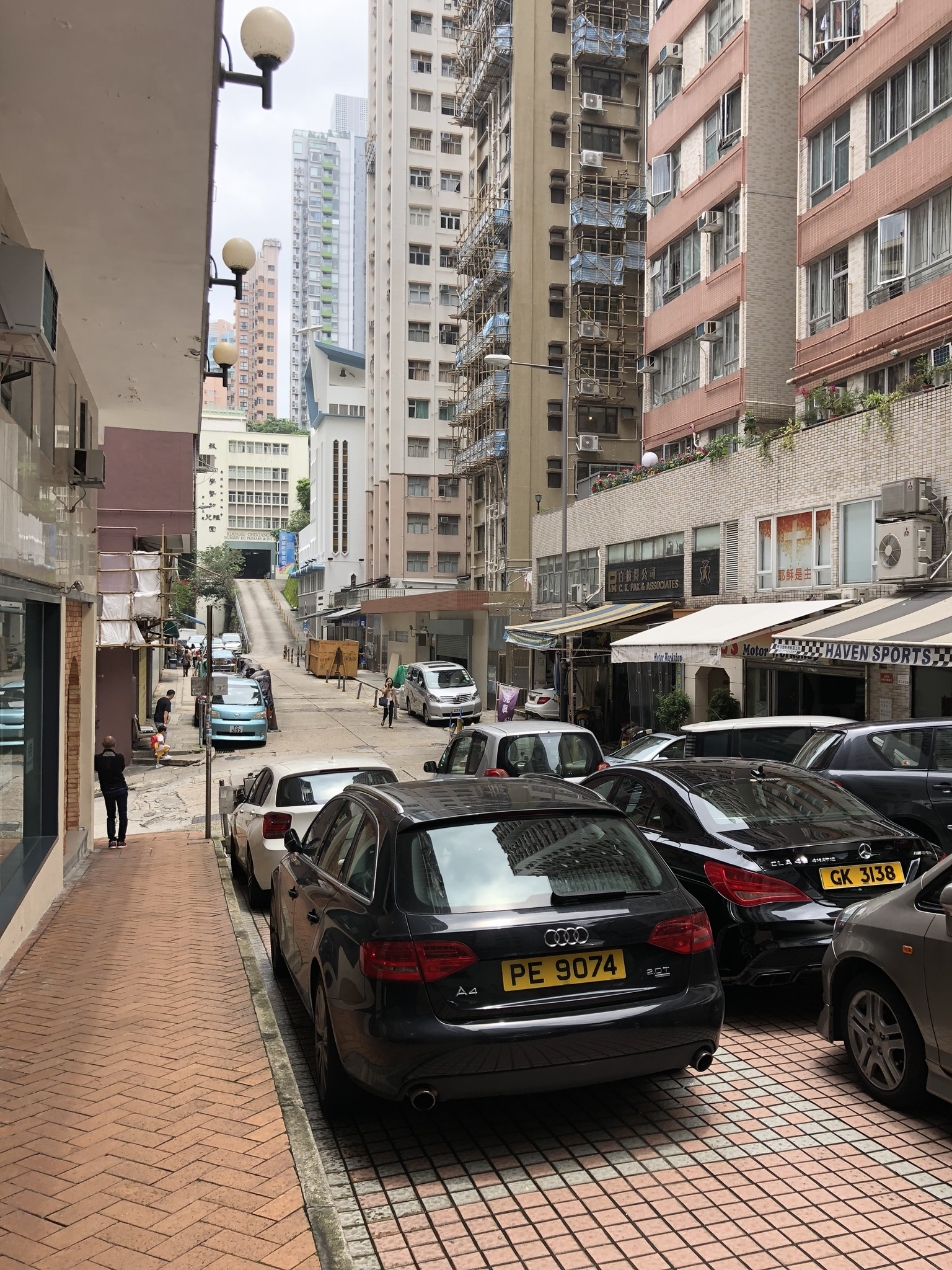
Looking east on Ching Wah Street in 2019

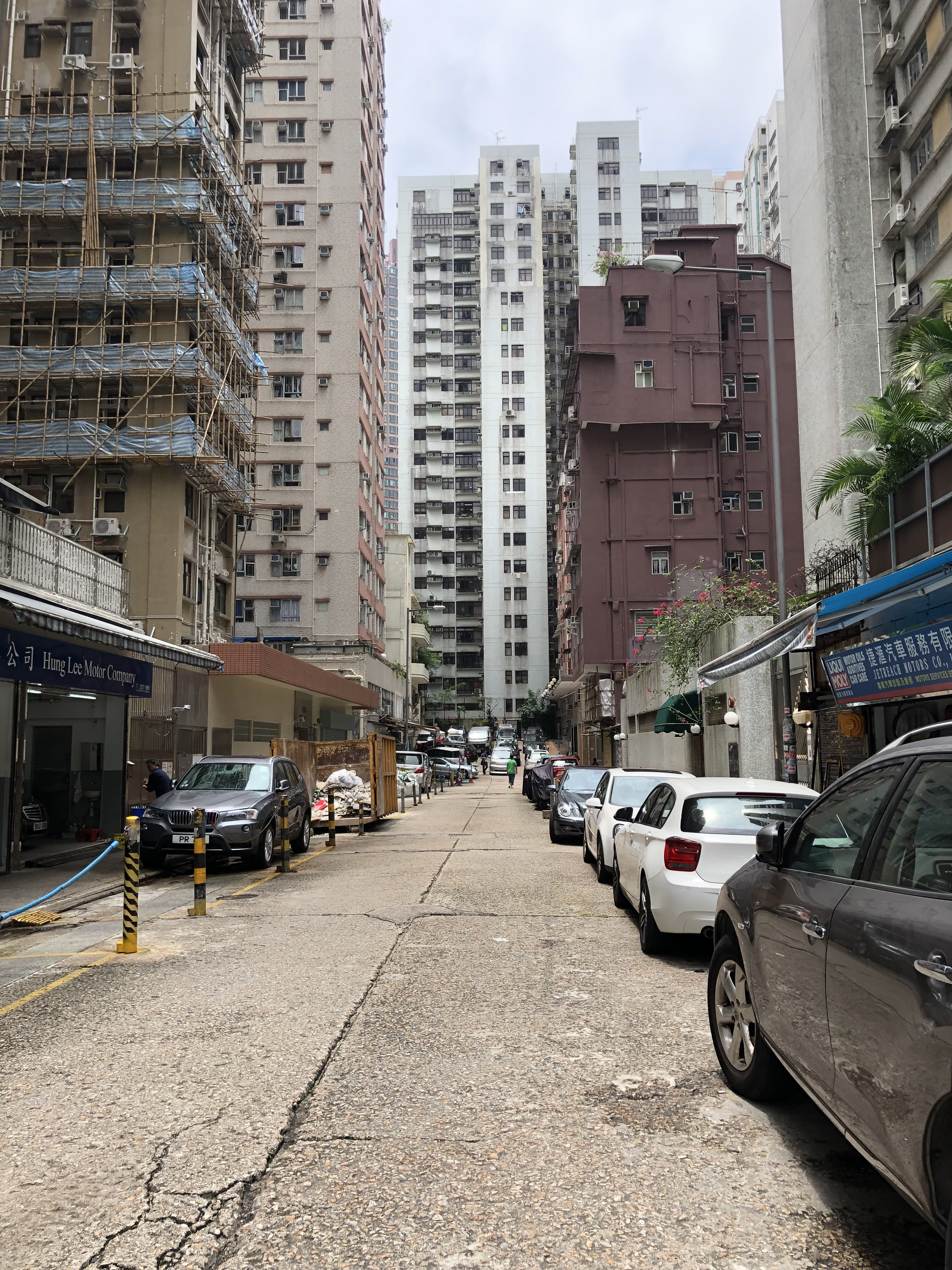
Looking west on Ching Wah Street in 2019
