= Arthur Tyrer =

English footballer

Personal information
- Full name: Arthur Spencer Tyrer
- Date of birth: 25 February 1931
- Place of birth: Manchester, England
- Position: Left-half

Senior career*
Years	Team	Apps	(Gls)
	Manchester City	0	(0)
1949–1950	Mossley	23	(3)
1950–1954	Leeds United	39	(4)
1954–1955	Peterborough United	16	(2)
1955–1956	Shrewsbury Town	24	(3)
1956–1964	Aldershot	234	(9)
1964–19??	Hereford United		
- Fleet Town
- * Club domestic league appearances and goals

Arthur Spencer Tyrer (born 25 February 1931) is an English former professional footballer. He played in the Football League for Leeds United, Shrewsbury Town and Aldershot. He was born in Manchester.

Tyrer was with Manchester City before joining Cheshire League side Mossley. He worked as a plumber while with Mossley, until turning professional on joining Leeds United in September 1950. The £2000 fee paid by Leeds to Mossley was a record fee for Mossley at that time.

He left Leeds in July 1954, joining non-league Peterborough United, but returned to the Football League with Shrewsbury Town in June 1955. He moved to Aldershot in June 1956 and played over 200 times for the Shots before joining Hereford United in 1964. He later played for Fleet Town.

His brother Fred was a goalkeeper and also played for Mossley during the 1949–50 season.
