= Yeung Kwong =

Hong Kong trade unionist (1926–2015)

The Honourable Yeung Kwong GBM
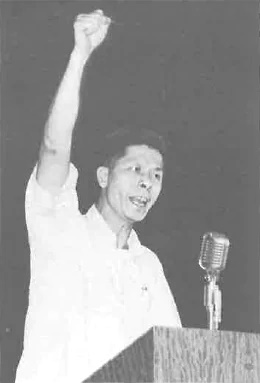
- Yeung Kwong at a rally in November 1967

Chairman of the Hong Kong Federation of Trade Unions
- In office 1962–1980
- Preceded by: Lee Sang
- Succeeded by: Poon Kwong-wai

President of the Hong Kong Federation of Trade Unions
- In office 1980–1988
- Preceded by: Chan Yiu-choi
- Succeeded by: Lee Chark-tim

Personal details
- Born: 1926 Hong Kong
- Died: 16 May 2015 (aged 88–89) Prince of Wales Hospital, Hong Kong
- Party: Hong Kong Federation of Trade Unions
- Occupation: Trade unionist

Chinese name
- Traditional Chinese: 楊光
- Simplified Chinese: 杨光
Transcriptions
Standard Mandarin
- Hanyu Pinyin: Yáng Guāng
Yue: Cantonese
- Yale Romanization: Yèuhng Gwōng
- Jyutping: Joeng^{4} Gwong^{1}

Yeung Kwong GBM (Chinese: 楊光; 1926 – 16 May 2015) was a Hong Kong trade unionist and labour rights activist. He served as chairman of the Hong Kong Federation of Trade Unions (HKFTU) from 1962 to 1980 and as its president from 1980 to 1988. He played a leading role in the 1967 Hong Kong riots against British rule in Hong Kong.

== Trade unionist career ==
Born in 1926, Yeung became a member of the Hong Kong Tramways Workers Union in 1948 and led strikes by Hong Kong Tramway's fare conductors the following year.

He served as chairman of the Hong Kong Federation of Trade Unions (FTU), the largest pro-Beijing labour union in Hong Kong, from 1962 to 1980, and then as its president between 1980 and 1988. From 1973 to 1987, he was a local deputy to the National People's Congress.

== 1967 riots ==
During the 1967 Hong Kong riots, which was inspired by the Cultural Revolution and escalated from a labour dispute at a plastic-flower factory in San Po Kong, Yeung served as director of the Committee of Hong Kong and Kowloon Compatriots from All Circles for Struggle Against British Hong Kong Persecution. Thousands were injured and 51 died, 15 of whom were killed in bombings planted by the leftists.

== Grand Bauhinia Medal controversy ==
Nominated by the FTU, then Chief Executive Tung Chee-hwa awarded the Grand Bauhinia Medal, the highest honour in Hong Kong, to Yeung for his "outstanding contribution to the labour movement and labour welfare in Hong Kong and for his dedicated community service" in 2001.

The award ceremony was held on 13 October 2001, and controversy immediately rose after the announcement, with many people believing that Tung, who was seeking re-election at the time, was pandering to the FTU, which is an important bloc of vote in the unique Chief Executive election system in Hong Kong. Yeung had in 1996 and 2002 sat on the Election Committee that elected Tung as Chief Executive. Some critics asserted that Yeung was not suitable for the highest honour of the land. Critics argued the event was a symbolic gesture for approval of the 1967 riot. Criticisms also came from victims of the riots and officials responsible for putting down the unrest, but the government declined to say if Yeung's "contributions" included what he did during the protests.

"It is not a matter of who encouraged this kind of action [bomb attacks]. Oppression will result in popular revolt," Yeung responded, also replying that deaths and injuries were inevitable in the struggle when asked if he felt sorry for the victims.

== Death ==
In the morning of 16 May 2015, Yeung died at the Prince of Wales Hospital in Sha Tin after he underwent a heart operation. Acting Chief Executive Carrie Lam sent her condolences to Yeung's family and praised him for his contributions to the labour movement. Chief Executive CY Leung, Secretary for Labour and Welfare Matthew Cheung and other senior officials including the Director of Beijing's Liaison Office Zhang Xiaoming attended the funeral on 14 June 2015.

Protesters gathered outside his funeral with banners in the memory of those who died at the hands of the leftists during the 1967 riots. Some brought champagne to celebrate his death, while others brought pineapples (a local metaphor for bombs and grenades) and cursed him.
