= 1956 Hong Kong riots =

Political riots

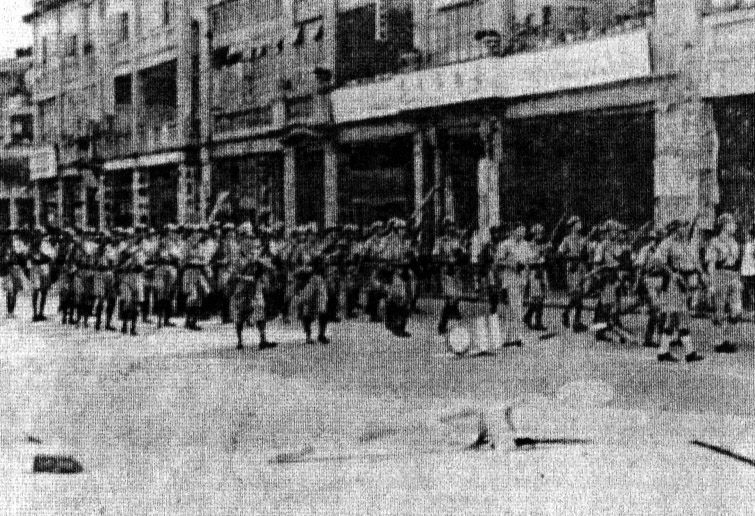
- Members of the Hong Kong Police Force dispatched to quell the riots
- Date: 10–12 October 1956
- Location: British Hong Kong
- Caused by: Several provocations, particularly the removal of the Republic of China flag and the large "Double Ten" emblem hanging from Lei Cheng Uk Estate.
- Goals: Apologies from the staff of Lei Cheng Uk Estate; Public support for the government of the Republic of China
- Methods: Demonstrations, strikes, arsons, occupations of buildings, attacks against police
- Result: Protests quelled: Several protesters arrested or deported; Diplomatic protest by the PRC government against the British government; ROC/Kuomintang influence in Hong Kong weakened

Parties
Rightists: Pro-Kuomintang camp; Rightist unions and labour groups; Triads; Supported by: Republic of China; Kuomintang	Leftists: Pro-CCP unions and labour groups; Supported by: People's Republic of China; Chinese Communist Party	British Hong Kong: Hong Kong Police Force; Department of Political Affairs; Supported by: United Kingdom: British Army; Royal Air Force

Lead figures
		Alexander Grantham (Governor); E.B. David (Colonial Secretary); Arthur Crawford Maxwell (Commissioner of Police); Lui Lok

Units involved
		• Riot team; • Special Police Force; • Special Reserve Force; • Auxiliary Air Force; • British Forces Overseas Hong Kong

Casualties
- Deaths: 59
- Injuries: 500
- Arrested: 6,000
- Charged: 2,195

1956 Hong Kong riots
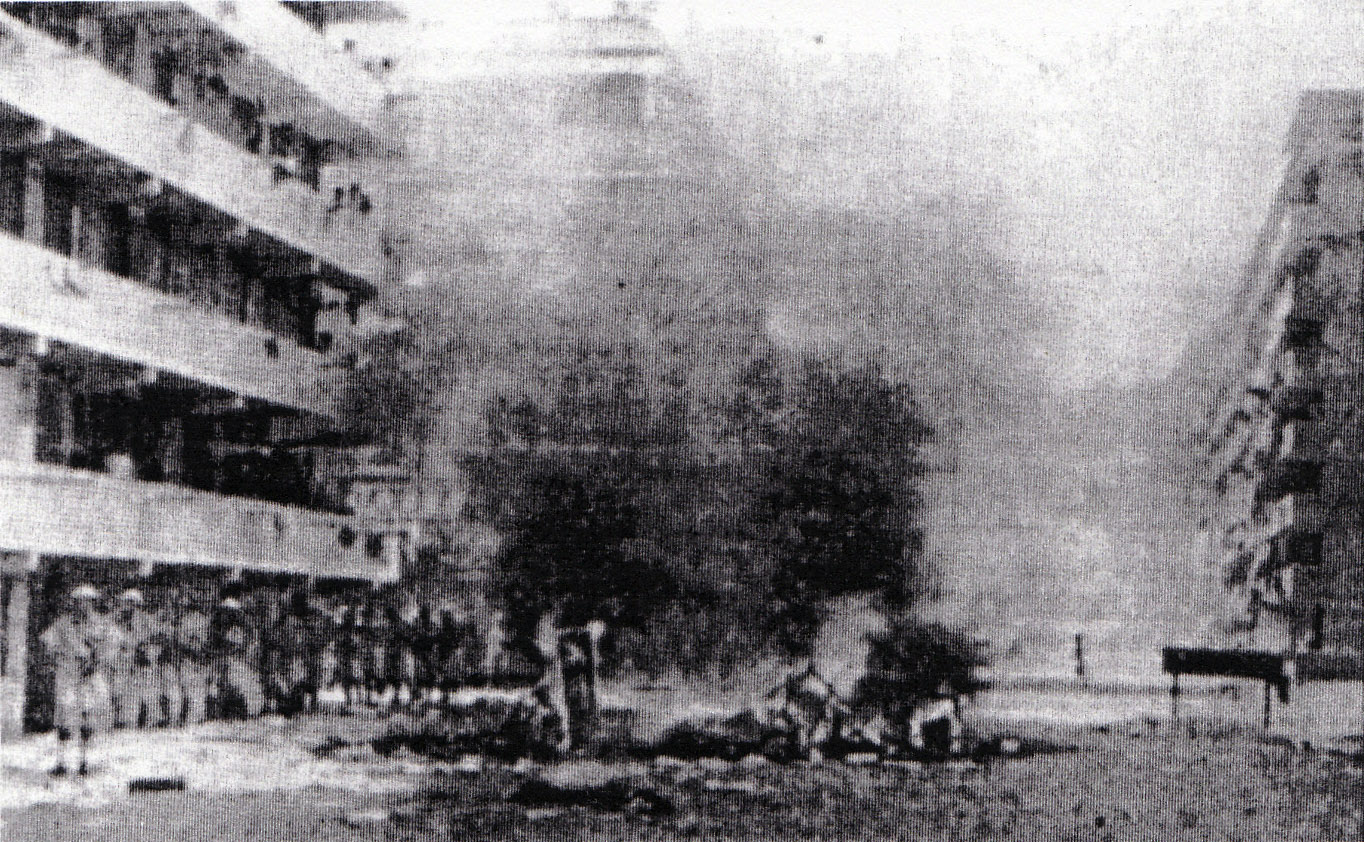
- Protest photos
- Traditional Chinese: 雙十暴動
- Simplified Chinese: 双十暴动
- Literal meaning: Double Ten riots
Transcriptions
Standard Mandarin
- Hanyu Pinyin: Shuāngshí Bàodòng
Yue: Cantonese
- Yale Romanization: Sēung sahp bouh duhng
- Jyutping: Soeng1 sap6 bou6 dung6

The 1956 Hong Kong riots, also known as the Double Ten riots (Chinese: 雙十暴動), were the result of escalating provocations between the pro-Kuomintang and pro-CCP camps on Double Ten Day, 10 October 1956.

Most violence took place in the town of Tsuen Wan, five miles from central Kowloon. A mob stormed and ransacked a clinic and welfare centre, killing four civilians.

The protests spread to other parts of Kowloon including along Nathan Road. By 11 October, some of the mob began targeting foreigners. Protesters in Kowloon turned over a taxi carrying the Swiss Vice Consul Fritz Ernst and his wife on Nathan Road. The rioters doused the cab in gasoline and lit it on fire resulting in the death of the driver and Mrs. Ernst who succumbed to her injuries two days later.

To quell the riots, Colonial Secretary Edgeworth B. David ordered extra manpower from the British Forces Hong Kong, including armoured troops of 7th Hussars, to reinforce the Hong Kong Police Force in and dispersing the rioters. In total, there were 59 deaths and approximately 500 injuries. Property damage was estimated at US$1,000,000.

== Outbreak of violence ==
Shortly after 9 am on 10 October, housing officials at the Lei Cheng Uk Resettlement Area ordered the removal of several Kuomintang flags from a housing block in the estate to the strong objection of residents. Arguments grew as a crowd gathered at the estate's administration office and police attended the scene wherein brick and stones were thrown. By 2 pm, three of the estate staff had been assaulted and injured, and over 300 officers had arrived at the scene and the crowd had grown to roughly 2,000. This crowd was dispersed after the police fired tear gas.

Clashes resumed at 8 pm when people began to throw stones at police officers coming to reinforce the area. The first serious casualties occurred when a fire engine crashed into a sidewalk after being pelted by stones and fireworks, killing at least three and injuring several others. As police fired more tear gas, the crowd moved to the intersection of Tai Po Road and Castle Peak Road, pelting passing vehicles and passers-by. Contemporaneous accounts report that Europeans were specifically targeted. Several police vehicles, fire engines, ambulances and busses were damaged in the violence, with one fire engine upturned and set on fire at about 10 pm. By midnight, police had fired over 1,000 canisters of tear gas at the crowd.

In the early morning, the crowd surrounded the Sham Shui Po Police Station and stones were thrown at the station and officers and a police post at Tai Hang Tung was destroyed. The crowd torched a restaurant in Cheung Sha Wan and several cars near the Broadway Theatre (now near the Mong Kok subway station). Two schools, the Heung Tao Middle School and one near Playing Field Road, were also set on fire.

At least 42 of the people killed died by gunshot wounds. There was no evidence of anyone other than the Hong Kong police using firearms.

== See also ==
- 1950s in Hong Kong
- 1966 Hong Kong riots
- 1967 Hong Kong riots
- 1981 Hong Kong riots
- 2014 Hong Kong protests
