= 1950s in Hong Kong =

The 1950s in Hong Kong began against the chaotic backdrop of the resumption of British sovereignty after the Japanese occupation of Hong Kong ended in 1945, and the renewal of the Chinese Civil War in mainland China. It prompted a large influx of refugees from the mainland, causing a huge population surge: from 1945 to 1951, the population grew from 600,000 to 2.1 million. The government struggled to accommodate these immigrants. Unrest in China also prompted businesses to relocate their assets and capital from Shanghai to Hong Kong. Together with the cheap labour of the immigrants, the seeds of Hong Kong's economic miracle in the second half of the 20th century were sown.

== Background ==
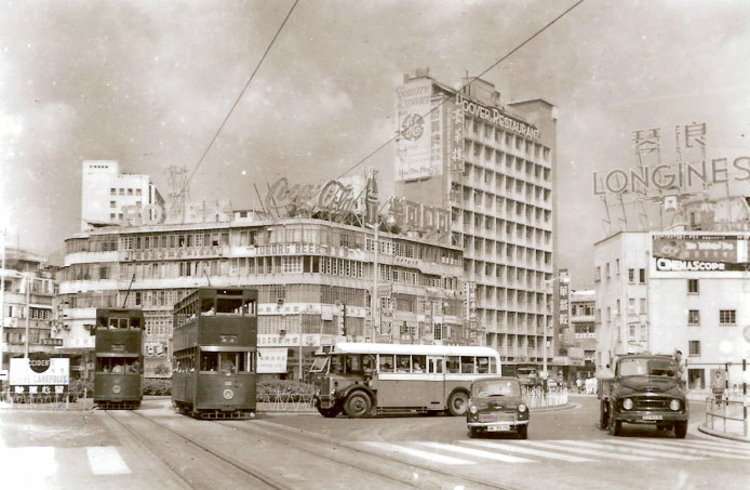
Causeway Bay 1955

As the Communists drew near to a victory in early 1949, there were fears that Hong Kong was going to be invaded by the Communists. The British Government was determined to keep Hong Kong as a capitalist outpost within a communist sphere of influence, though the memories of the Berlin Blockade and the perceived antagonism of communist governments was still fresh in their mind. The garrison was reinforced and plans of emergency evacuation to Australia were made. However, the People's Liberation Army were ordered to stop advancing at the border and Hong Kong remained a British colony.

Hong Kong was a valuable trade centre at the gates of China and it was hoped that by retaining this connection doing business with the new government in Peking would be easier. To give up Hong Kong to the Communists without a fight would be seen as a national weakness in the face of the growing communist threat in Europe and Asia, especially the Malayan Emergency. Debates did take place during the 1950s at the British Parliament in Westminster in which it was discussed that Hong Kong would have to be handed back to China if the colony's entrepôt trade could not be maintained. The people were outraged at any suggestion of this, so the Government of Hong Kong became committed to turning Hong Kong into a manufacturing centre.

== Demographics ==
Coat of Arms of Hong Kong (1959–97), officially adopted in late January 1959

=== Population ===
The 1950s began with a large number of impoverished people without jobs and natural resources. The problem was further compounded with a flood of refugees from mainland China who were able to cross due to the lack of border controls until June 1951. The People's Republic of China was established in 1949 under a reorganised Communist Party.

As many as 100,000 people fled to Hong Kong each month under the new regime, many of whom were rich farmers and capitalists who brought with them management experience, though even more were criminals who established the influential triad society in Hong Kong. By the mid-1950s, Hong Kong had increased its population to a staggering 2.2 million. By 1956, Hong Kong's population density became one of the highest in the world.

=== Housing ===
In 1953, the Shek Kip Mei Fire left 53,000 homeless. This prompted major change: Sir Alexander Grantham, the 22nd Governor of Hong Kong, drew up an emergency housing programme that introduced the 'multi-storey building' as a common building form. His structures were capable of housing 2,500 people in a fire/flood-proof structure. The idea was to house as many and as fast as possible to deal with the homeless shelter crisis. Every floor in the building had a communal room, washroom, and toilet facility. Each person was granted 24 square feet (2.2 m^{2}) per adult and half that for each child under 12. High rise buildings would become the norm, as skyscrapers have a small footprint compared to their overall volume.

== Culture ==
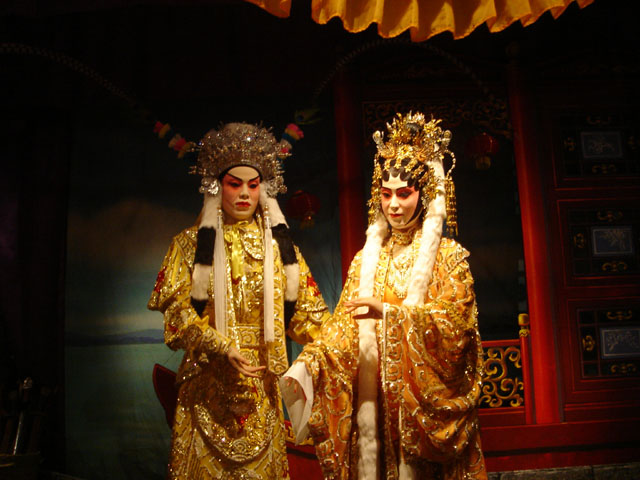
Cantonese Opera

=== Lifestyle ===
At the end of the Japanese occupation, the Government of Hong Kong held a monopoly on the purchase and distribution of food and raw materials including rice and cotton yarn. Price controls by the Government were not eliminated until 1953. The period can best be summarised by low resources and an endless increase in population. Many mainlanders would cross the border to Hong Kong and establish illegal huts on rooftops and the edges of mountains. The integration of different groups from China and original tenants of Hong Kong would also create a society in which everyone had to wrestle with the overwhelming number of language dialects.

=== Education ===
Those who were born in Hong Kong were provided with education and housing by the government. The first group of refugees were only granted temporary asylums since the government believed they would return to the mainland. An estimated 9% of the government's expense were spent on education and health care. The curriculum made it crucial that students did not feel associated with Hong Kong or China in any national sense. It emphasised that they were the middlemen for the Sino-British trade relationships.

An internal government paper in the period indicated about 34 schools in the urban area were actually classified as controlled by the Communists, including 24 in the New Territories. Another 32 schools had leftist presences such as staff and teachers. A new ordinance was passed in 1952 to allow any director of education to shut down a school believed to be controlled by political indoctrination. The refugees mostly sought their education and social services from Christian churches. Actions were taken at the Heung Tao Middle School and Nanfang College.

=== Entertainment ===
One of the main forms of entertainment in the 1950s was Cantonese Opera. Shaw Brothers Studio would also produce some of the first groups of martial art films. Their notable sword fighting style would be emulated on many movies and TV dramas for years to come.

=== Law and order ===
The Hong Kong 1956 riots was one of the first full-scale riots in the territory. It awoke the Government to the dangers of low wages, long working hours, and overcrowded conditions. Tighter law control would diminish the triads in the period. Most of the social problems in the 1950s dealt with Nationalist and Communist factions on Hong Kong soil. The British Government in London, feared the Communists would promote anti-British sentiments in the colony. Thus, the Colonial Office in Whitehall encouraged the Government of Hong Kong to follow anti-Communist policies within the colony. The leading account of the 1956 riots appeared in a book by historian Rohan Price published by Routledge in 2020.

== Economy ==
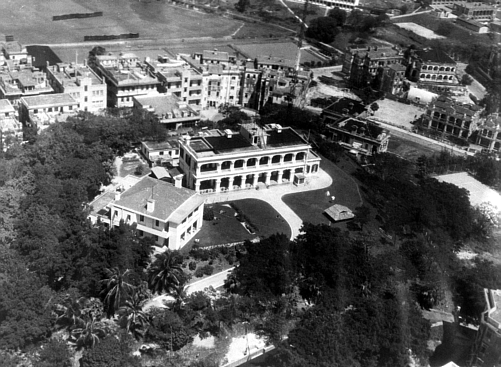
Royal Observatory, Hong Kong, in Tsim Sha Tsui, Kowloon, in 1950

=== Transportation ===
The Hong Kong Taxi service was founded in 1947 with a mere 329 cars. By the end of the decade in 1959, it had expanded to 851 cars. The service became more popular since it didn't require passengers to follow a particular bus route.

=== Industrial ===
In 1953, two land reclamation projects added 3,000,000 square feet (280,000 m^{2}) to Hong Kong. The first project would specifically add runway space to the Kai Tak Airport. Additional reclamation would turn Kwun Tong and Tsuen Wan into industrial towns. The early industrial centres produced materials such as buttons, artificial flowers, umbrellas, textiles, enamelware, footwear and plastics.

=== Hospital and hospitality ===
The handling of the refugees required the collaboration of numerous services and programs. The British Red Cross would set up their first branch in Hong Kong on 12 July 1950 as the Hong Kong Red Cross. They started in the Lai Chi Kok Hospital and began the Patient Concern Service. Blood donation also began in 1952 with 483 people donating in the first year. A Disaster Relief service was established in 1953 mostly to deal with the Shek Kip Mei fire. The Hong Kong Tourism Association was established in 1957.

=== Finance ===
The banks at the time were not regulated by the Government. There were no central banks or monetary policies. The Governor did not want to regulate the Hong Kong Stock Exchange even though it had become a serious problem in financing the fast-growing economy at the time. Manufacturers constantly complained about the shortage of investments. Pressure was coming from within and outside Hong Kong to fix the policies.
