= 1967 Hong Kong riots =

Riots against British colonial rule in Hong Kong

- Part of the Cold War in Asia
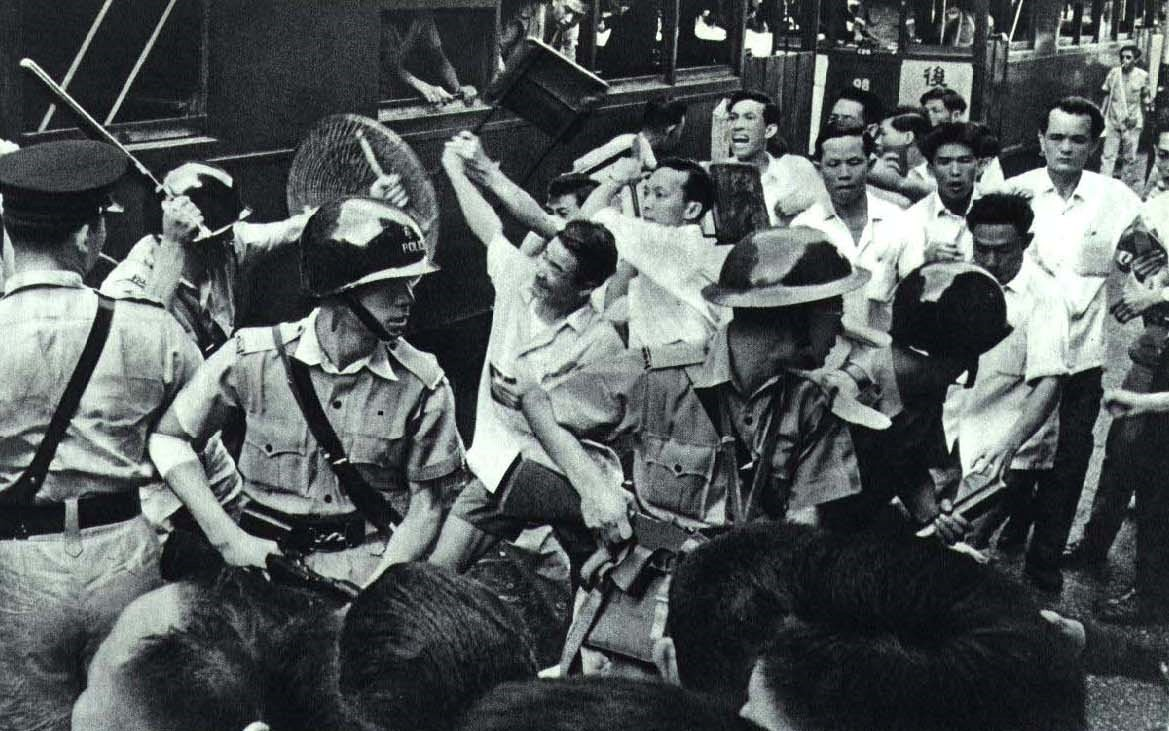
- Clash between striking tram workers and Hong Kong police officers on 30 August 1967
- Date: May – December 1967
- Location: British Hong Kong
- Methods: Demonstrations, strikes, riots, assassinations, planting of bombs
- Result: Riots quelled: Government crackdown on pro-CCP groups; Pro-CCP publications banned; British colonial government retains control of Hong Kong

Parties
British Hong Kong; Hong Kong Police Force; British Forces Overseas Hong Kong	Pro-CCP leftists; Anti-British Struggle Committee; Hong Kong and Kowloon Federation of Trade Unions; People's Militia

Lead figures
David Trench	Yeung Kwong

Casualties
- Deaths: 51
- Injuries: 832
- Arrested: 4,979
- Convicted: 1,936

1967 Hong Kong riots
- Traditional Chinese: 六七暴動
- Simplified Chinese: 六七暴动
- Literal meaning: '67 riots
Transcriptions
Standard Mandarin
- Hanyu Pinyin: liù-qī bàodòng
Hakka
- Romanization: luk^{5}-cit^{5} bau^{4}tung^{4}
Yue: Cantonese
- Yale Romanization: luhk-chāt bouhduhng
- Jyutping: luk^{6}-cat^{1} bou^{6}dung^{6}

The 1967 Hong Kong riots were large-scale anti-government riots that occurred in Hong Kong during British colonial rule. Beginning as a minor labour dispute, the demonstrations eventually escalated into protests against the colonial government. The protests were partially inspired by successful anti-colonial demonstrations in Portuguese Macau which had occurred a few months prior.

The use of roadside bombs and petrol bombs by demonstrators prompted the Hong Kong Police Force (HKPF) to raid the demonstrators' strongholds and arrest their leaders. Fifty-one people were killed in the subsequent violence. As many of the bombs were made in pro–Chinese Communist Party (CCP) schools, then governor David Trench decided to close those schools and ban pro-CCP publications in the colony.

The protests occurred against the backdrop of the Cultural Revolution taking place in the People's Republic of China (mainland China), with many of the protesters harbouring leftist views and sympathies toward the CCP. After the riots, the British Hong Kong government publicly reflected on its failure to address certain social grievances and carried out major social reforms.

== Tensions ==
The initial demonstrations were labour disputes that began as early as May 1967 in shipping, taxi, textile, and cement companies. The unions that took up the cause were all members of the Hong Kong and Kowloon Federation of Trade Unions, a labour group with strong ties to Beijing.

The political climate was tense in Hong Kong in the spring of 1967. Across the colony's northern border was a tumultuous People's Republic of China (PRC), with Red Guards carrying out purges and engaging in infighting amidst the Cultural Revolution. To the west of Hong Kong, in the Portuguese colony of Macau, two months of violent clashes between colonial police and pro-CCP demonstrators had just ended. Order was not restored to Macau despite the intervention of the Portuguese army, and a general strike in January 1967 pressured the Portuguese government into agreeing to many of the demonstrators' demands, placing the colony under the de facto control of the PRC. Up to 31 protests were held in Hong Kong.

== Outbreak of violence ==
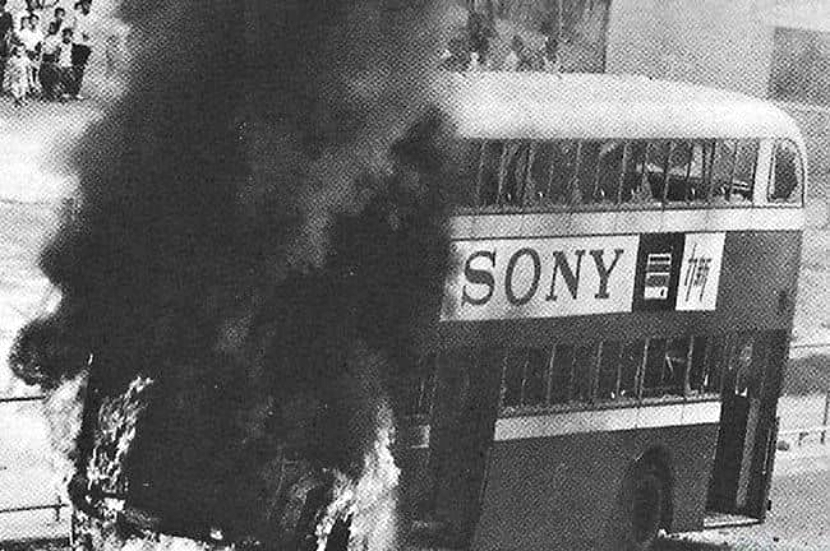
A KMB double decker set ablaze by rioters on 12 May 1967

On 1 May (International Workers' Day), three labour strikes began in Hong Kong, including one at the Hong Kong Artificial Flower Works, a factory producing artificial flowers in San Po Kong. Of the 679 workers in the factory, only 174 were unionised and willing to strike. Picketing workers clashed with management, and riot police were called in on 6 May. In violent clashes between the police and the picketing workers, 21 workers were arrested. Representatives from the union protested at police stations but were themselves arrested.

The next day, large-scale demonstrations erupted on the streets of Hong Kong. Many pro-CCP demonstrators carried Mao Zedong's Little Red Book in their left hands and shouted communist slogans. The Hong Kong Police Force engaged with the demonstrators and arrested another 127 people. A curfew was imposed and all police personnel were called into duty.

In the PRC, newspapers praised the demonstrators' activities and condemned the colonial government's actions as "fascist atrocities". In Hong Kong, the pro-Beijing newspapers Ta Kung Pao and Wen Wei Po similarly voiced their support for the demonstrators and opposition to the colonial government.

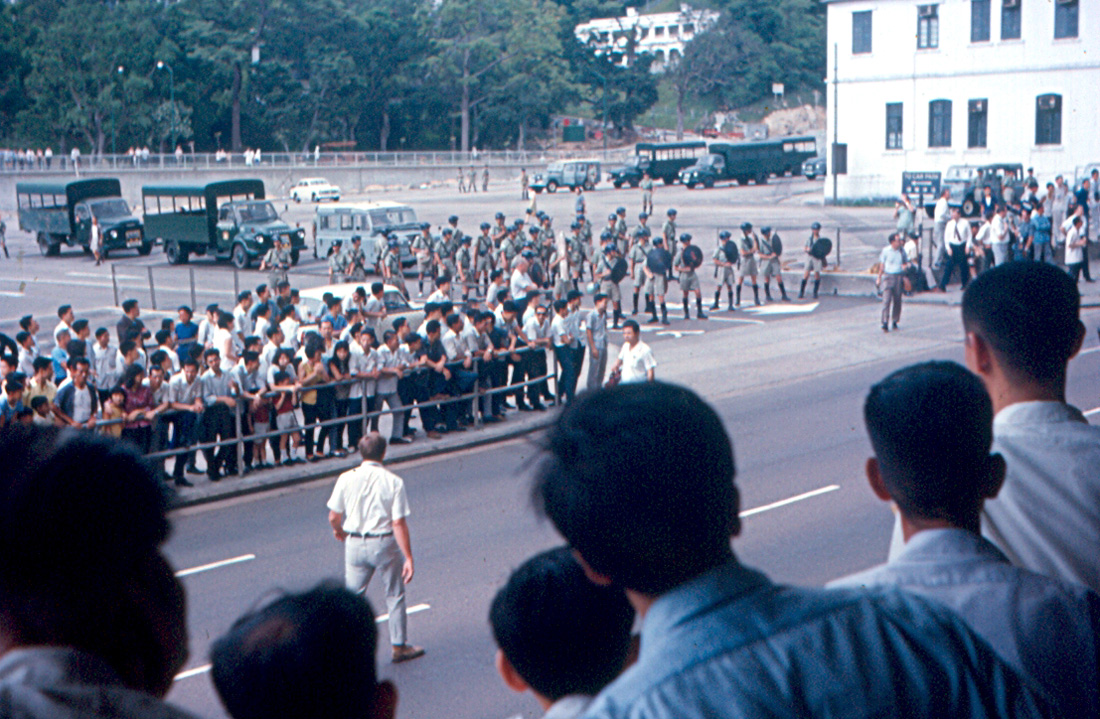
Bystanders look on as police officers prepare to confront rioters on 21 May 1967. The rioters are out of the picture, below the balcony and to the right of where the photographer is standing.

In Hong Kong's Central District, large loudspeakers broadcasting pro-CCP rhetoric and propaganda were placed on the roof of the Bank of China Building. Colonial authorities responded by blaring out Cantonese opera from larger speakers placed nearby. Posters were put up on walls with slogans like "Blood for Blood", "Stew the White-Skinned Pig", "Fry The Yellow Running Dogs", "Down With British Imperialism" and "Hang David Trench". Students distributed newspapers carrying information about the demonstrations and pro-CCP rhetoric to the public.

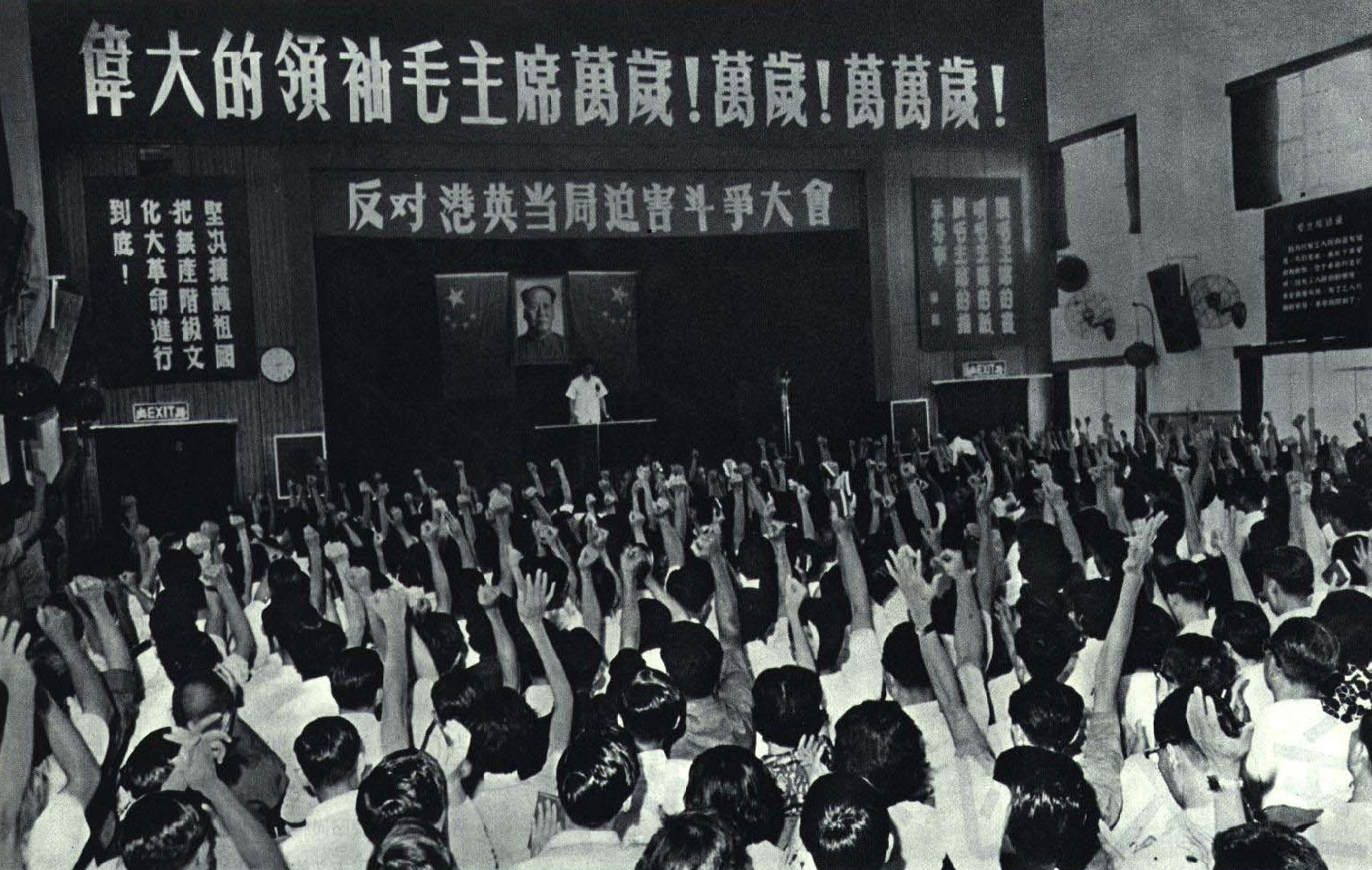
Meeting of the Anti-British Struggle Committee

On 16 May, demonstrators formed the "Committee of Hong Kong and Kowloon Compatriots from All Circles for Struggle Against British Hong Kong Persecution" or "Anti-British Struggle Committee" for short. Yeung Kwong of the Hong Kong and Kowloon Federation of Trade Unions was appointed its chairman. The committee organised and coordinated a series of large demonstrations. Hundreds of supporters from 17 different leftist organisations demonstrated outside Government House, chanting pro-CCP slogans. At the same time, many workers went on strike, with Hong Kong's transport services being disrupted particularly badly.

More violence erupted on 22 May, with another 167 people being arrested. The rioters began to adopt more sophisticated tactics, such as throwing stones at police officers or police vehicles passing by, before retreating into leftist "strongholds" such as newspaper offices, banks or department stores once the police responded. Casualties began soon after. At least eight protester deaths were recorded before 1 July; most of the victims were shot or beaten to death by the police.

== Height of violence ==
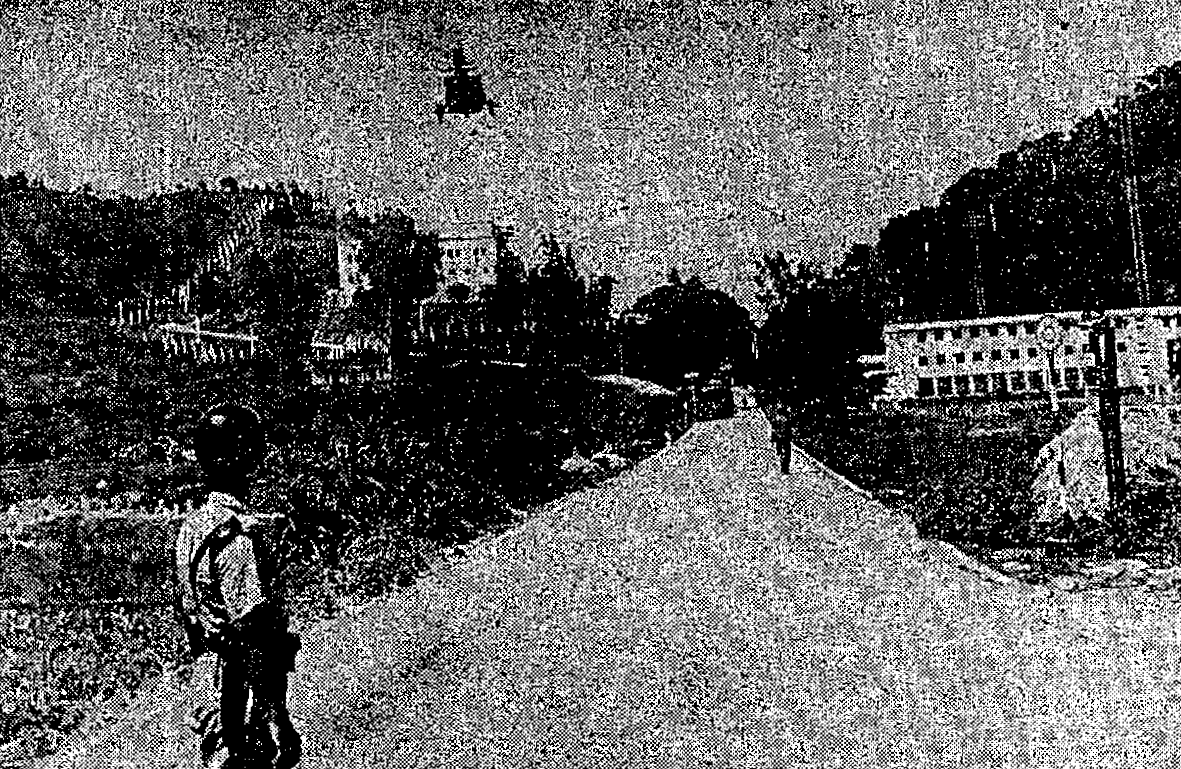
In the afternoon of the Sha Tau Kok incident, police officers stood guard at the cordon outpost. A military helicopter arrived at the scene to conduct low-altitude reconnaissance.

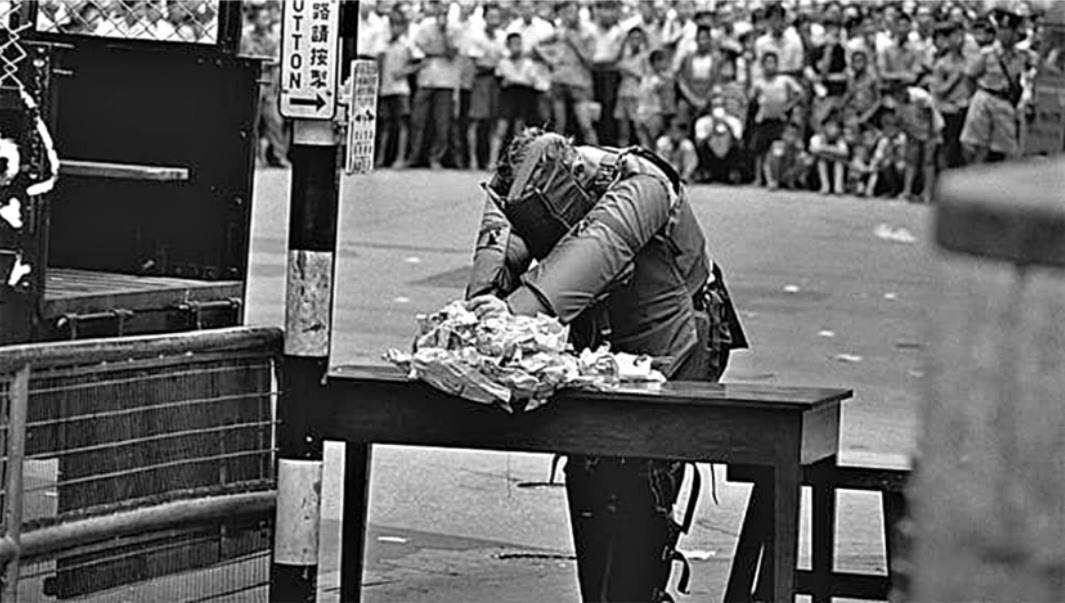
A British Army bomb disposal expert attempts to disarm an improvised explosive device.

On 8 July, several hundred demonstrators from the PRC, including members of the Militia, crossed the border at Sha Tau Kok and attacked Hong Kong police officers stationed nearby. The police attempted to disperse the crowd using tear gas and wooden bullets, prompting armed members of the crowd to open fire on the police. Five police officers were killed and eleven injured in a brief exchange of fire. The People's Daily in Beijing ran editorials supporting the demonstrators' actions in Hong Kong; rumours that the PRC was preparing to take control of the colony began to circulate. The pro-CCP protesters in Hong Kong tried in vain to organise a general strike in the colony.

Unable to progress by peaceful means, the demonstrators resorted to more extreme measures, planting bombs, as well as decoys, throughout the city. Normal life was severely disrupted and casualties began to rise. An eight-year-old girl, Wong Yee-man, and her two-year-old brother, Wong Siu-fan, were killed by a bomb wrapped like a gift placed outside their residence. Bomb disposal experts from the police and the British Forces Overseas Hong Kong defused as many as 8,000 home-made bombs, of which 1,100 were found to be real. Locals nicknamed these bombs "pineapples". Most police stations across Hong Kong were fortified with sandbags as police facilities were the target of numerous attacks using bombs, homemade fragmentation explosives, and various projectiles.

The Hong Kong government imposed emergency regulations, granting the police special powers in an attempt to quell the unrest. Leftist newspapers were banned from publishing; leftist schools alleged to be bomb-making factories, such as Chung Wah Middle School, were shut down; many pro-CCP leaders were arrested and detained; and some of them were later deported to mainland China.

On 19 July, demonstrators set up barbed wire defences on the Bank of China Building.

In response, police raided leftist strongholds, including Kiu Kwan Mansion. In one of the raids, helicopters from HMS Hermes – a Royal Navy aircraft carrier – landed police on the roof of the building. Upon entering the building, the police discovered bombs and weapons, as well as a leftist "hospital" complete with dispensary and an operating theatre.

The public outcry against the violence was widely reported in the media, and the demonstrators again switched tactics. On 24 August, Lam Bun, a popular anti-communist radio commentator, was murdered by a death squad posing as road maintenance workers as he drove to work with his cousin. Lam's assailants prevented him from getting out of his car, and doused Lam and his cousin with petrol. They were both then set on fire. Lam died later that day in a hospital; his cousin died several days later. Other prominent figures of the media who had voiced opposition against the riots were also threatened, including Louis Cha, then chairman of the Ming Pao newspaper, who consequently left Hong Kong for almost a year before returning.

The waves of bombings did not subside until October 1967. In December, Chinese Premier Zhou Enlai ordered the leftist groups in Hong Kong to stop all bombings, and the riots in Hong Kong finally came to an end after eight months. It became known much later that, during the riots, the commander of the People's Liberation Army's Guangzhou Military Region Huang Yongsheng (one of Lin Biao's top allies) secretly suggested invading and occupying Hong Kong, but his plan was vetoed by Zhou Enlai.

== Aftermath ==
=== Casualties ===
By the time the rioting subsided at the end of the year, 51 people had been killed, of whom at least 22 were killed by the police and 15 died in bomb attacks, with another 832 people sustaining injuries, while 4,979 people were arrested and 1,936 convicted. Millions of dollars in property damage resulted from the rioting, far in excess of that reported during the 1956 riot. Confidence in the colony's future declined among some sections of Hong Kong's populace, and many wealthy residents sold their properties and migrated overseas, particularly to places such as Australia, Canada, and Singapore.

Incomplete list of deceased
Name	Age	Date of death	Notes
Chan Kong-sang	14	12 May 1967	An apprentice hairdresser who died during a riot in Wong Tai Sin Resettlement Area
Tsui Tin-po (徐田波)	42	8 June 1967	A worker in the Mechanics Division of the Public Works Department who died in custody inside Wong Tai Sin Police Station after his arrest
Lai Chung (黎松)	52	8 June 1967	A Towngas worker who was shot by police in a raid and then died by drowning
Tsang Ming (曾明)	29	8 June 1967	A Towngas worker who was beaten to death by police in a raid
Tang Chi-keung (鄧自強)	30	23 June 1967	A plastics factory worker who was shot by police in a raid against a trade union
Chau Chung-shing (鄒松勝)	34	24 June 1967	A plastics factory worker who was beaten to death by police after his arrest
Law Chun-kau (羅進苟)	30	24 June 1967	A plastics factory worker who was beaten to death by police after his arrest
Lee On (李安)	45	26 June 1967	A worker for Shaw Brothers Studio who died while being admitted to hospital from a law court.
Fung Yin-ping (馮燕平)	40	8 July 1967	A police corporal who was killed by militiamen from mainland China in the border town of Sha Tau Kok
Kong Shing-kay (江承基)	19	8 July 1967	A police constable who was killed by militiamen from mainland China in the border town of Sha Tau Kok
Mohamed Nawaz Malik	28	8 July 1967	A police constable who was killed by militiamen from mainland China in the border town of Sha Tau Kok
Khurshid Ahmed	27	8 July 1967	A police constable who was killed by militiamen from mainland China in the border town of Sha Tau Kok
Wong Loi-hing (黃來興)	27	8 July 1967	A police constable who was killed by militiamen from mainland China in the border town of Sha Tau Kok
Zhang Tiansheng (張天生)	41	8 July 1967	A militiaman from mainland China who was shot and killed by Hong Kong Police in the border town of Sha Tau Kok
Cheung Chi-kong (鄭浙波)	32	9 July 1967	A porter working in Western District who was shot and killed during a riot
Ma Lit (馬烈)	43	9 July 1967	A porter working in Western District who was shot and killed during a riot
Lam Po-wah (林寶華)	21	9 July 1967	A police constable who was killed by a stray bullet during a riot
Choi Wai Nam (蔡惠南)	27	10 July 1967	A rioter who was shot and killed by police on Johnston Road, Wan Chai
Lee Chun-hing	35	10 July 1967	A furniture worker who was beaten to death by protesters on Johnston Road, Wan Chai
Li Sze (李四)	48	11 July 1967	A rioter who was shot and killed by police on Johnston Road, Wan Chai
Mak Chi-wah (麥志華)		12 July 1967	A rioter who was shot and killed by police on Un Chau Street, Sham Shui Po
unknown		12 July 1967	A rioter who was shot and killed by police on Soy Street, Mong Kok
Ho Fung (何楓)	34	14 July 1967	A worker for Kowloon Dockyard who was killed in a police action against the Kowloon Dock Workers Amalgamated Union
unknown		14 July 1967	A rioter who was shot and killed by police on Reclamation Street, Yau Ma Tei
Yu Sau-man (余秀文)		15 July 1967	A rioting employee of Wheelock Spinners who was shot and killed by police
So Chuen (蘇全)	28	26 July 1967	A worker from a textile factory who was shot and killed by police in Mong Kok while attacking a bus in service
Ho Chuen-tim (何傳添)		9 August 1967	A fisherman from Sha Tau Kok who was arrested during a police raid on a memorial service held for killed demonstrators on 24 June. Died on 9 August.
Wong Yee-man (黃綺文)	8	20 August 1967	An 8-year-old girl who was killed, along with her younger brother, by a homemade bomb wrapped like a gift on Ching Wah Street, North Point
Wong Siu-fan (黃兆勳)	2	20 August 1967	Younger brother of Wong Yee Man
Lam Bun (林彬)	37	25 August 1967	A radio commentator for Commercial Radio Hong Kong who was killed in an incendiary attack by a group of men posing as road maintenance workers on his way to work on 24 August. Died on 25 August.
Charles Workman	26	28 August 1967	A sergeant in the Royal Army Ordnance Corps who was killed when a homemade bomb he was defusing at Lion Rock exploded
Ho Shui-kei (何瑞麒)	21	29 August 1967	A rioting mechanical worker who was shot and killed by police in Tung Tau Village, Wong Tai Sin.
Lam Kwong-hoi (林光海)		29 August 1967	A technician for Commercial Radio Hong Kong who was killed in an incendiary attack with his elder cousin Lam Bun on his way to work on 24 August. Died on 29 August.
Aslam Khan	22	3 September 1967	A firefighter who was killed by a homemade bomb during a failed defusing
Cheung Chak (章集)	38	3 September 1967	A rioting bus driver who was wounded in a police shooting on 30 August. Died of pneumonia on 3 September.
Yau Chun-yau (邱進友)		20 September 1967	A Royal Hong Kong Jockey Club worker who was killed by the explosion of his own bomb near barracks in Kam Tsin, Sheung Shui.
Lo Hon-bun (盧漢彬)		1 October 1967	A rioter who was killed in a police shooting
To Hung-kwong (杜雄光)	19	13 October 1967	A police constable who was killed by a bomb in Wanchai
Tong Tak-ming Peter (唐德明)	18	14 October 1967	A middle school student who was killed by a bomb in Wanchai
Ronald J. McEwen	37	5 November 1967	A senior police inspector who was killed by a bomb in Causeway Bay while clearing the area of civilians. Many others were injured.
Sit Chun-hung		28 November 1967	A police constable who was stabbed to death in Shek Kip Mei
Lee Koon-sang		9 December 1967	A police constable who was shot and killed in Kam Tin

List of convicted demonstrators who died in custody
Name	Prisoner no.	Date of death	Notes
Tsang Tin-sung	27381	27 January 1968	A 32-year-old worker who took part in the Mong Kok riot on 15 July 1967, sentenced to 14 months in jail. Found dead after hanging himself on the morning of 27 January 1968.
Tang Chuen	28017	29 December 1969	Chairman of a pro-CCP workers' union who initiated a riot in Taikoo Dockyard on 6 June 1967, sentenced to 6 years in jail. Died from liver disease in Queen Mary Hospital on 29 December 1969.

=== Reactions ===
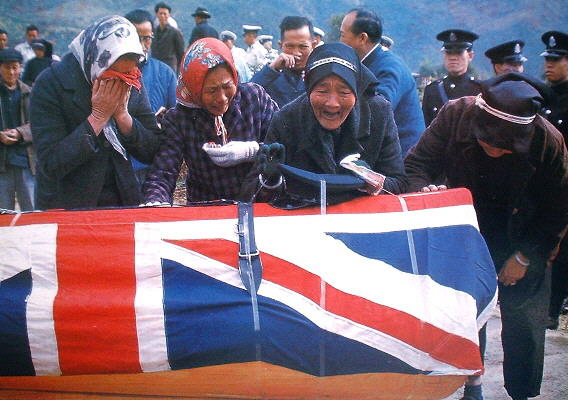
The funeral of PC Lee Koon-sang on 13 December 1967

On 22 August, in Beijing, thousands of people demonstrated outside the office of the British chargé d'affaires, before Red Guards attacked, ransacked, and burned down the main building.

Many leftist groups with close ties to the PRC were dissolved during and after the 1967 riots. The murder of radio host Lam Bun, in particular, outraged many Hong Kong residents and discredited the leftist movement in Hong Kong as a whole. The credibility of the PRC and its local sympathisers among Hong Kong residents was severely damaged for more than a generation.

=== Social reforms ===
The 1966 and 1967 riots in Hong Kong served as a catalyst for social reforms in Hong Kong, with the implementation of positive non-interventionism in 1971, while David Trench grudgingly introduced some social reforms. It was not until the governorship of Murray MacLehose in the 1970s that the scope of reforms was greatly expanded, transforming the lives of those living in Hong Kong and marking the emergence of Hong Kong as one of the Four Asian Tigers.

== Legacy ==
The Hong Kong Police Force was applauded for its behaviour during the riots by the British Government. In 1969, Queen Elizabeth II granted the force the privilege of the "Royal" title. This remained in use until the end of British rule in 1997.

A number of participants in the 1967 riots have since gained a foothold in post-handover Hong Kong politics. For instance, Tsang Tak-sing was a rioter who later co-founded the largest pro-Beijing political party in the city, the Democratic Alliance for the Betterment and Progress of Hong Kong. Along with his brother Tsang Yok-sing, they continued to promote Marxism in Hong Kong. In 2001, Yeung Kwong was awarded the Grand Bauhinia Medal by then chief executive Tung Chee-hwa, a symbolic gesture that raised controversy as to whether the post-1997 Hong Kong government of the time was supportive of the riots.

In 2017, hundreds of protesters who took part in the 1967 riots were hailed as heroes in a memorial ceremony at Wo Hop Shek public cemetery to mark the 50th anniversary of the uprising. Prominent attendees included former finance sector lawmaker Ng Leung-sing, the Hong Kong Federation of Trade Unions' Michael Luk Chung-hung, and head of the 67 Synergy Group Chan Shi-yuen. They called for Beijing to vindicate the protests, which they have continued to refer to as a "patriotic act against British colonial tyranny".

== Police website revisionism controversy ==
In mid-September 2015, Hong Kong media reported that the Hong Kong Police Force had made material deletions from its website concerning "police history", in particular, the political cause and the identity of the groups responsible for the 1967 riots, with mention of communists being expunged. This came under the backdrop of increasing Beijing central government influence in Hong Kong following the 2014 Hong Kong protests.

For example, "Bombs were made in classrooms of leftist schools and planted indiscriminately on the streets" became "Bombs were planted indiscriminately on the streets"; the fragment "waving aloft the Little Red Book and shouting slogans" disappeared, and an entire sentence criticising the hypocrisy of wealthy pro-Beijing businessmen, the so-called "red fat cats", was deleted.

The editing gave rise to criticisms that history was being rewritten to make it appear as though the British colonial government, rather than the demonstrators, were responsible for the start of the violence. Stephen Lo, the new Commissioner of Police, said the content change of the official website was to simplify it for easier reading; Lo denied that there were any political motives, but his denials left critics unconvinced. The changes were subsequently reversed.

== Depictions in media ==
- In John Woo's action film Bullet in the Head, the 1967 riots are briefly shown.
- In Tsui Hark's film Dangerous Encounters of the First Kind, images of the 1967 riots are shown.
- In Anthony Chan's film A Fishy Story (1989), the 1967 riots are an important part of the plot.
- In the stage play and film I Have a Date with Spring, the riots (although only briefly referenced) are a key plot point.
- Wong Kar Wai's film 2046 features the riots in the background and uses a few old newsreels of the riots.
- The film about modern Hong Kong history Mr. Cinema depicts the riots.

== See also ==
- 1960s in Hong Kong
- Scientia Secondary School
- Pui Kiu Middle School
- Fukien Secondary School
- Chung Ying Street
- 1966 Hong Kong riots
- Spring Garden Lane
- 1971 JVP Insurrection, in Ceylon (present-day Sri Lanka)
- 1981 Hong Kong riots
- 1989 Tiananmen Square protests and massacre, in mainland China
- United front in Hong Kong
