= Struggle Committee (Hong Kong) =

Anti-colonial group active during the 1967 Hong Kong riots

Committee of Hong Kong–Kowloon Chinese Compatriots of All Circles for the Struggle Against Persecution by the British Authorities in Hong Kong
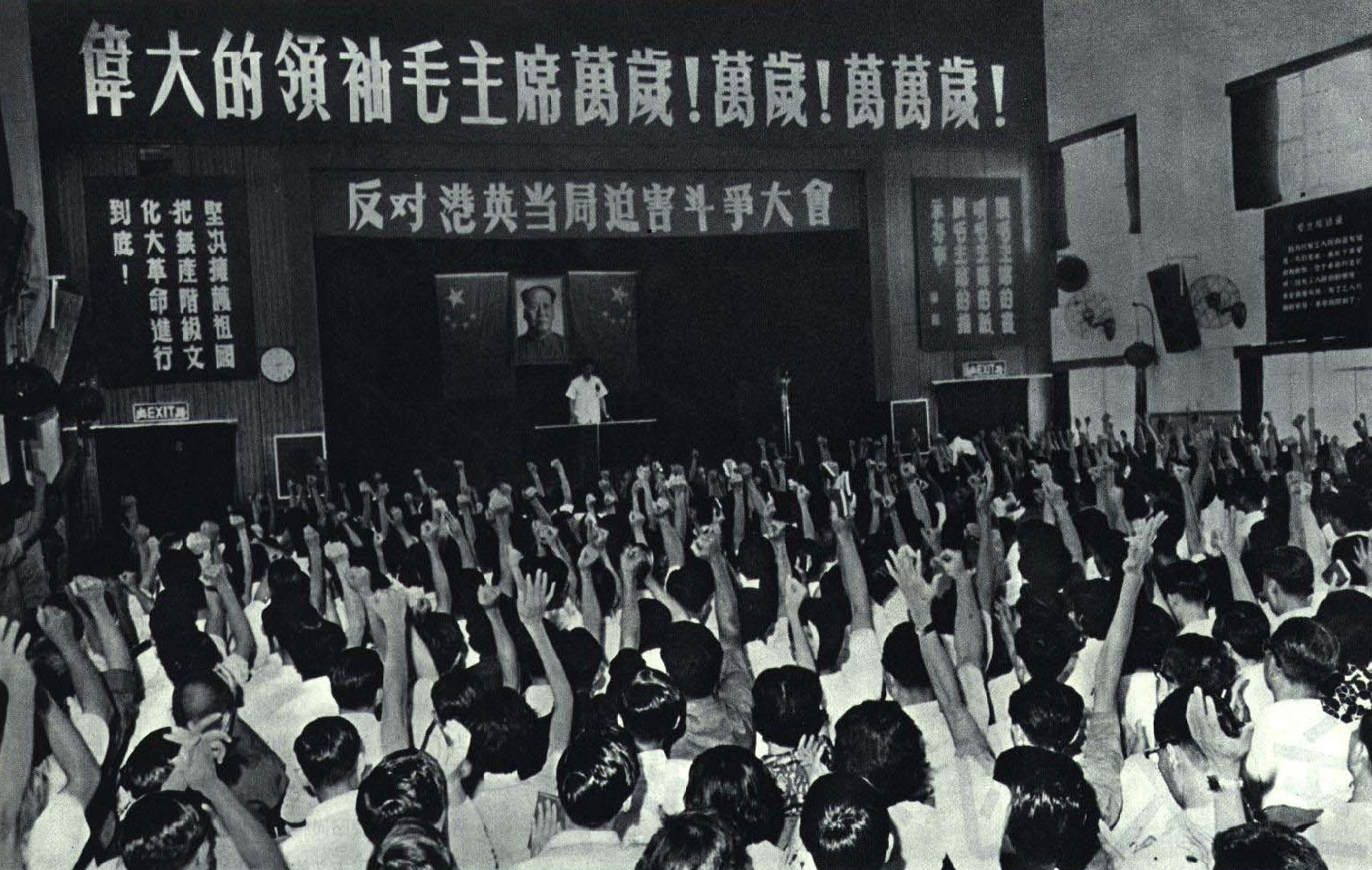
- Struggle Committee meeting, 30 August 1967
- Other name: Struggle Committee
- Leader: Yeung Kwong
- Dates active: 16 May – 12 September 1967
- Size: 104 members

Chinese name
- Traditional Chinese: 港九各界同胞反對港英迫害鬥爭委員會
- Simplified Chinese: 港九各界同胞反对港英迫害斗争委员会
Transcriptions
Standard Mandarin
- Hanyu Pinyin: Gǎng Jiǔ Gèjiè Tóngbāo Fǎnduì Gǎng Yīng Pòhài Dòuzhēng Wěiyuánhuì
Yue: Cantonese
- Yale Romanization: Góng Gáu Gokgaai Tùhngbāau Fáandeui Góng Yīng Bīkhoih Daujāng Wáiyùhnwúi
- Jyutping: Gong^{2} Gau^{2} Gok^{3}gaai^{3} Tung^{4}baau^{1} Faan^{2}deoi^{3} Gong^{2} Jing^{1} Bik^{1}hoi^{6} Dau^{3}zang^{1} Wai^{2}jyun^{4}wui^{6*2}

Abbreviation
- Traditional Chinese: 鬥委會
- Simplified Chinese: 斗委会
Transcriptions
Standard Mandarin
- Hanyu Pinyin: Dòu Wěi Huì
Yue: Cantonese
- Yale Romanization: Dau Wái Wúi
- Jyutping: Dau^{3} Wai^{2} Wui^{6*2}

The Committee of Hong Kong–Kowloon Chinese Compatriots of All Circles for the Struggle Against Persecution by the British Authorities in Hong Kong, often shortened to the Struggle Committee, was a political committee which opposed the British colonial administration in Hong Kong. It was established by pro-Chinese Communist Party (CCP) activists during the 1967 Hong Kong riots. Yeung Kwong, the then chairman of the Hong Kong and Kowloon Federation of Trade Unions, led the Struggle Committee as the chairman of a 17-member executive committee.

Although the British Hong Kong government blamed the Struggle Committee for a series of bombings during the 1967 riots, the group was dysfunctional and failed to unite the anti-colonial movement in Hong Kong. Before being banned by the colonial authorities in September 1967, the Struggle Committee held only two meetings.

== Name ==
Following the May 1967 riots in Hong Kong, the Struggle Committee published an English-language book titled The May Upheaval in Hong Kong, under the full name Committee of Hong Kong–Kowloon Chinese Compatriots of All Circles for the Struggle Against Persecution by the British Authorities in Hong Kong. However, the group's full name in its original Chinese has been translated variously. An English translation of a Radio Guangdong report broadcast on 27 May 1967 gave the name "Hong Kong and Kowloon All Circles Struggle Committee to Oppose Persecution by the Hong Kong British Authorities". Other translations include the "Hong Kong and Kowloon Struggle Committee of Chinese Compatriots from All Circles Against British Persecution" and the "Hong Kong–Kowloon All Sectors Anti-Persecution Struggle Committee".

"Struggle Committee" is the most common English-language abbreviation for the group. Other abbreviations include the "Anti-British Struggle Committee" and the "All-Circles Anti-Persecution Struggle Committee".

== Background and prelude to founding ==
Three labour strikes began in Hong Kong on 1 May 1967 (International Workers' Day), including one at Hong Kong Artificial Flower Works, a factory producing artificial flowers in San Po Kong. Locals in the neighbourhood had long endured poor living conditions and neglect from the British colonial government. John Cooper, a British writer who was living in Hong Kong at the time, spoke to San Po Kong's susceptibility to civil unrest:

Street upon street of tall dilapidated buildings vied with each other for the limited space available, hundreds upon hundreds of hostile citizens lived out their lives in human rabbit warrens, plenty of workers were available to start a riot, plenty of workers' organisations existed to support it, and plenty of students would come along to give it political backing.

On 6 May, picketing workers clashed with management at Hong Kong Artificial Flower Works, and police were subsequently brought in to forcefully end the unrest. Leftist newspapers in Hong Kong published scathing editorials about the incident the following morning. For example, an editorial by Ta Kung Pao criticised ethnic Chinese policemen for "beating [their] compatriots", describing them as "disgraceful" and urging them to "quickly repent".

The original labour disputes had morphed into city-wide political riots by 11 May. On the morning of that day, several pro-Chinese Communist Party (CCP) demonstrators marched around the city, carrying copies of Mao Zedong's Little Red Book and posters condemning the colonial government. They chanted communist slogans and sang Chinese revolutionary songs. In the afternoon, demonstrators attempted to breach into a number of factories, prompting a significant police response. In the evening, the demonstrations devolved into riots, as mobs of local youth joined the demonstrators in throwing stones and bottles at the police.

== Founding ==
The pro-CCP Hong Kong and Kowloon Federation of Trade Unions (FTU) was responsible for organising formal demonstrations against the colonial government. To consolidate the movement, the FTU established the Committee of Hong Kong–Kowloon Workers of All Industries for the Struggle Against Persecution by the British Authorities in Hong Kong on 12 May. Four days later, on 16 May, the FTU and a number of other pro-CCP groups founded the Committee of Hong Kong–Kowloon Chinese Compatriots of All Circles for the Struggle Against Persecution by the British Authorities in Hong Kong, or Struggle Committee for short. The goal of creating the Struggle Committee was to establish a central command to lead the anti-colonial demonstrations.

The government of the People's Republic of China (PRC) announced its support for the Struggle Committee on 15 May, following a series of protests at colonial government buildings in Hong Kong and neighbouring Portuguese Macau. The PRC government condemned what it called the "sanguinary brutality and fascist atrocities of the British imperialists" and listed five demands of the colonial government in Hong Kong:

1. All the just demands put forward by Chinese residents and workers in Hong Kong must be immediately accepted.
2. All arrested individuals, including workers, cameramen, and journalists, must be set free immediately.
3. All fascist measures must cease.
4. All those responsible for the sanguinary atrocities must apologise to the victims and offer them compensation.
5. A guarantee must be given that there will be no repetition of similar incidents (i.e. the police response).

The CCP Central Committee's newspaper, the People's Daily, praised the demonstrators' "dauntless mettle" and warned the colonial authorities of "going against the historical trend". Hong Kong's then governor, David Trench, became increasingly concerned that the demonstrations were a preliminary attempt by the PRC to take control of the colony. At a press conference he stated, "[the demonstrators'] aim is to Macau us", a reference to the 12-3 incident in Macau, which saw the colony being placed under the de facto control of the PRC.

== Operations ==
During the 1967 riots, the Struggle Committee led strikes in a number of industries, notably transportation, which reportedly involved up to 60,000 workers. It also organised protest marches on the Hong Kong governor's residence. To fund the group's activities, the PRC government gave US$3.3 million to the Struggle Committee through the state-controlled All-China Federation of Trade Unions. The Struggle Committee received support not only from the PRC government, but also from the mainland Chinese population at large.

The colonial authorities blamed the Struggle Committee for the bombings which took place during the 1967 riots, and the Hong Kong Bar Association designated the group as a terrorist organisation on 8 September. The colonial government officially banned the Struggle Committee and ordered the arrests of its members on 12 September.

However, former members of the Struggle Committee denied the charges and asserted that the group was non-violent and ultimately an operational failure. Wong Kin-lap, a member of the executive committee, stated that the Struggle Committee followed the principle of acting "on just grounds, to our advantage, and with restraint" (有理，有利，有節), which he understood to mean non-violence. He also commented on the group's inability to function due to the colonial authorities' strict enforcement of its ban on public assemblies:

The regulations put stringent restrictions on public assemblies. Under the circumstances, the committee could not meet at all, let alone take command of the struggle. Consequentially, everybody proceeded with the struggle in his own way without a centralised command and it did no good for the British Hong Kong authorities.

Liu Yat-yuen, another member of the executive committee, stated:

Some people thought the Struggle Committee directed the actions of the anti-British struggle, and even ordered the planting of bombs. It was a misunderstanding. People outside the leftist camp thought the struggle committee was a leading group for the riots, but it was only a nominal leading organisation or a 'united front' tool which did not even discuss the strategy for the struggle. The committee held only two meetings during the riots and had no grasp of what happened in the later stages of the disturbances.

The colonial authorities later discovered that radicals within the Xinhua News Agency's Hong Kong branch, which acted as the PRC's de facto embassy in the colony, were actually responsible for orchestrating the escalation in violence. The leadership of the Struggle Committee claimed that they had no knowledge of Xinhua's covert activities.

== Organisation ==
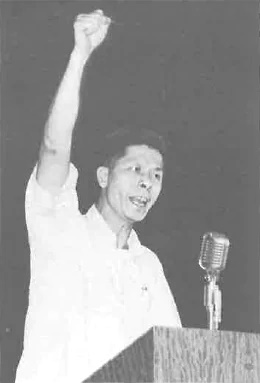
Yeung Kwong at a rally in November 1967

The Struggle Committee had 104 members who elected a 17-member executive committee. The executive committee was chaired by FTU chairman Yeung Kwong. The executive committee's members were:

- Yeung Kwong
- Fei Yimin
- Xie Honghui
- Wong Kin-lap
- Wang Kuancheng
- Hu Jiu
- Huang Yanfang
- Wu Yi
- Liu Xian
- Guo Tianhai
- Deng Chuan
- Wong Fu-wing, Dick
- Pan Desheng
- Liu Yat-yuen
- Ren Yizhi
- Chen Hong
- Tong Ping-ta

== See also ==
- Pro-Beijing camp (Hong Kong)
