= Canton Trust and Commercial Bank =

Chinese bank in Hong Kong

Canton Trust and Commercial Bank (Chinese: 廣東信託銀行) was a Chinese bank in Hong Kong.

== History ==
In 1965, bank runs occurred at branches of the bank after it suffered from heavy lending to property sector and fraud. Runs on branches of the bank in Aberdeen and Yuen Long occurred in early February 1965. The Hongkong and Shanghai Banking Corporation agreed to lend the bank HK$25 million to overcome the crisis, but despite this the bank declared bankruptcy on 8 February 1965. This caused a series of bank runs in other several small and medium banks in Hong Kong.

== See also ==
- Stock disasters in Hong Kong
