= Ming Tak Bank =

Defunct bank in Hong Kong

Ming Tak Bank (Chinese: 明德銀號) was a bank in Hong Kong.

The bank was owned and managed by Poon Kai-kwong who was also involved in construction and property businesses. And Poon was very active in investing in the property boom in the early 1960s in Hong Kong. In January 1965, the bank was taken over by the British Hong Kong Government but it later went bankrupt as a result of heavy losses from its property investment. This led to a series of bank runs in other small and medium-sized banks, and eventually a stock market crash.
