= 1981 Hong Kong riots =

Youth riots in Hong Kong

- Date: 25 December 1981 and 1 January 1982
- Location: Central, Hong Kong

Casualties
- Death: 0
- Injuries: 11
- Arrested: 27

Multiple disturbances broke out on Christmas Day of 1981 and New Year's Day of 1982 in British Hong Kong. Since most participants were young, the riots were also named as the Christmas youth riots of 1981 and New Year youth riots of 1982. The riots had a long-term impact on the government's youth policy.

== Events ==
A riot broke out in the early morning of Christmas Day, 25 December 1981 in Central, Hong Kong. In a minor road accident, a car driver accidentally hit a pedestrian near the Mandarin Oriental hotel around 1:30 am, arousing unrest among the youth in the area that eventually evolved into a riot. In the ensuing chaos, 11 people were injured and 7 cars damaged. The police deployed the Police Tactical Unit (PTU) to disperse the crowd. At 5 AM, the riot subsided and 18 people were arrested. The same day, the Government of Hong Kong increased the number of policemen patrolling major business areas and kept cars away from the Central District.

The day after the incident, Secretary for Home Affairs Denis Bray dismissed characterisations of the event as rioting, calling it "just some disturbances caused by kids who had too much to drink". He said there was no apparent motivation, attributing the disorder to "high spirits with some spirits out of bottles as well". A senior police commander also stated that the events were "definitely not a riot".

Another disturbance broke out early on New Year's Day of 1982, when crowds of youth began heckling revellers. The police had anticipated trouble, and had deployed hundreds of officers (both uniformed and plainclothes) to disperse the crowds. Nine people were arrested and released on bail.

== Aftermath ==
The Government of Hong Kong addressed the increasing "problems" with youth, citing disobedience in school and the popularity of snooker and arcade games among youth. The government channeled additional resources into youth welfare.

Two other riots in 1982 and 1984 were ignited by football fans and a tax on taxis.

== See also ==
- 1956 Hong Kong riots
- 1966 Hong Kong riots
- 1967 Hong Kong riots
- Youth in Hong Kong
