= Lee Ming-kwai =

Hong Kong law enforcement administrator

Dick Lee Ming-kwai GBS QPM CPM
- 李明逵
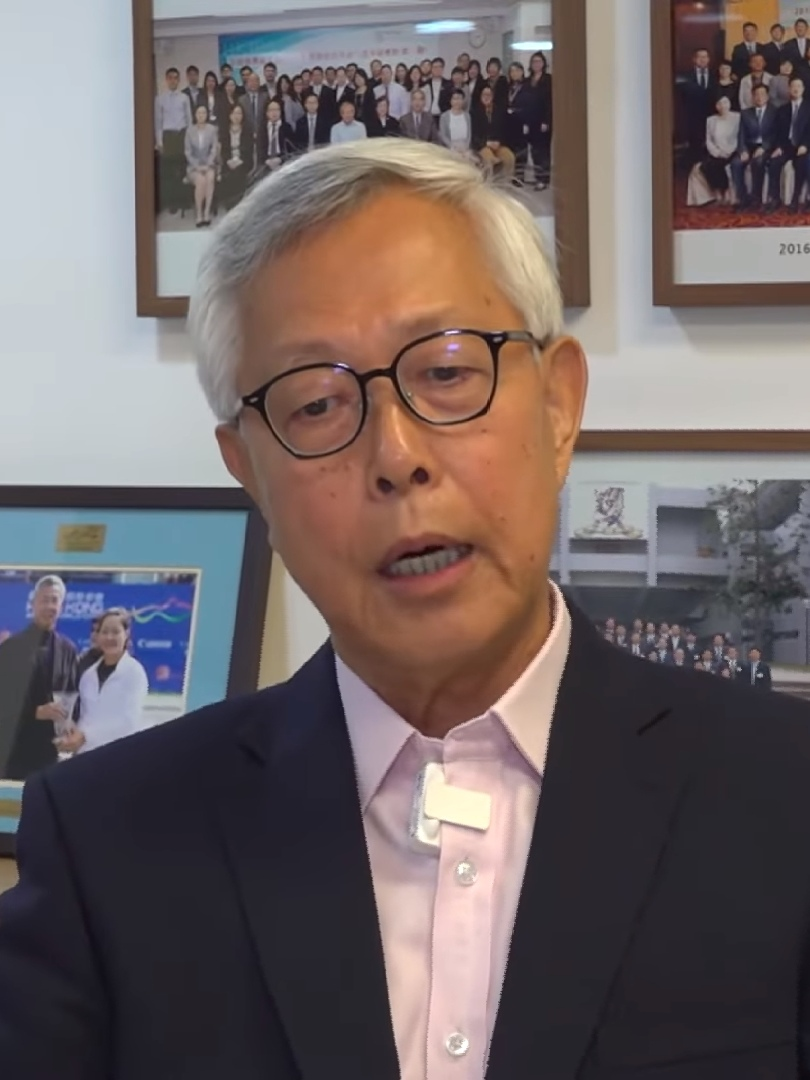

Commissioner of Police
- In office 10 December 2003 – 15 January 2007
- Preceded by: Tsang Yam Pui
- Succeeded by: Tang King Shing

Personal details
- Born: October 13, 1950 (age 76) British Hong Kong
- Spouse: Hui Ngan Fun
- Education: New Asia College, CUHK (BA)

Dick Lee Ming-kwai (Chinese: 李明逵; pinyin: Lǐ Míngkuí; Jyutping: Lei5 Ming4kwai4; born 13 October 1950) is a retired Hong Kong law enforcement administrator who formerly served as the Commissioner of Police of Hong Kong from 2003 to 2007.

== Biography ==
Lee attended The Chinese University of Hong Kong and joined the Royal Hong Kong Police Force (now Hong Kong Police Force) in December 1972 as a probationary inspector.

He served as an inspector in both uniform branches and CID in various police divisions in Hong Kong. As a superintendent, he was placed in charge briefly of training and reforming the Hawker Control Unit of the Urban Services Department (now the Food and Environmental Hygiene Department). Later, he was posted to a police school in the United Kingdom.

He was promoted to Chief Superintendent in 1992 and was the district commander of Wan Chai.

In 1995, Lee was promoted to the rank of Assistant Commissioner of Police. During this period, he was in charge of restoring order after rioting broke out at Vietnamese boat people detention centres across Hong Kong against the policy of mandatory repatriation.

Lee was in charge of the security of the Handover Ceremony in 1997. He became well known for ordering the playing of Beethoven's 5th Symphony over a PA system to cover the noise of protesters at the Hong Kong Convention and Exhibition Centre (HKCEC). He received a commendation from the Chief Executive of the HKSAR for his efforts during the handover period.

Lee was promoted to Senior Assistant Commissioner in 1998 and Deputy Commissioner in 2001. He was appointed Commissioner of Police in 2003. He is the first Chinese Commissioner of Police with a university degree.

Lee was well received by both the rank and file and senior officers of the police force. He had a reputation for being an operational commissioner, frequently visiting frontline units and participating in raids on vice premises. Lee would personally visit all colleagues injured on duty. He personally visited the scene of the fatal shooting of a police officer by another in Tsim Sha Tsui in the small hours of 17 March 2006.

Lee's handling of militant Korean protesters during the 6th Ministerial Conference of the World Trade Organisation in December 2006 earned him local and international acclaim. Over 1000 protesters were arrested after attacking police officers and police cordons at the HKCEC with minimal casualties.

Lee is related to former police commissioner Eddie Hui through marriage.

== Retirement ==
Lee formally retired as Commissioner of Police on 15 January 2007. He began a year of paid leave until January 2008. He has stated on an RTHK interview that he will no longer work for a salary after his retirement and intends to spend more time with his family and promoting local sports in Hong Kong.

== Awards ==
- 1975 – Commanding Officer's Commendation
- 1977 – Commanding Officer's Commendation
- 1990 – Colonial Police Long Service Medal
- 1994 – Colonial Police Medal for Meritorious Service
- 1997 – Queen's Police Medal for Distinguished Service
- 1997 – Hong Kong Police Long Service Medal with First Clasp
- 1998 – Chief Executive's Commendation
- 2002 – Hong Kong Police Long Service Medal with Second Clasp
- 2004 – Honorary Fellowship, Chinese University of Hong Kong
- 2005 – Hong Kong Police Long Service Medal with Third Clasp
- 2007 – Gold Bauhinia Star

Police appointments
Preceded by Tsang Yam-pui	Commissioner of Police of Hong Kong; 2003-2007	Succeeded by Tang King Shing
Order of precedence
Preceded by Sarah Liao; Recipients of the Gold Bauhinia Star	Hong Kong order of precedence Recipients of the Gold Bauhinia Star	Succeeded by Peter Kwong; Recipients of the Gold Bauhinia Star
