= Tang King-shing =

Tang King Shing GBS PDSM PMSM CPM
- 鄧竟成
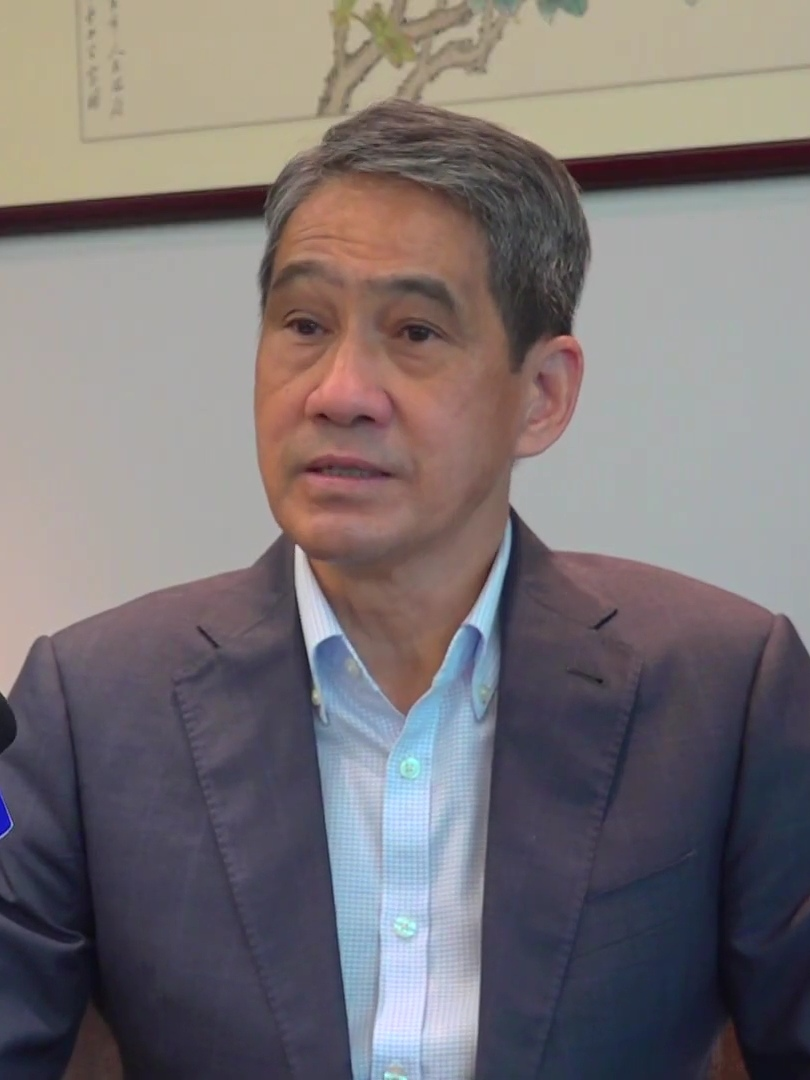

Commissioner of Police
- In office 16 January 2007 – 10 January 2011
- Preceded by: Lee Ming-Kwai
- Succeeded by: Andy Tsang

Personal details
- Born: 29 May 1954 (age 72) Hong Kong
- Education: University of Hong Kong (MPA)

Tang King Shing GBS PDSM PMSM CPM (traditional Chinese: 鄧竟成; simplified Chinese: 邓竟成; pinyin: Dèng Jìngchéng) was the Commissioner of the Hong Kong Police force until 10 January 2011.

Tang has been appointed as Chairman of the Country and Marine Parks Board for the period 1 September 2013 to 31 August 2015.

== Biography ==
Tang joined the Royal Hong Kong Police in 1976 as a Probationary Inspector. Prior to his promotion to a Superintendent in 1986, he served in divisions such as the Police Tactical Unit and the Special Duties Unit.

Tang was promoted in 1992 to Senior Superintendent and posted as District Commander Airport, Chief Superintendent Special Duty for the 1997 Handover of Sovereignty Ceremonies, District Commander of Mongkok District, as well as Deputy Regional Commander of Hong Kong Island Region. Between 1991 and 1993, Tang was seconded to the London Metropolitan Police under the Superintendent Exchange Scheme and performed the role of a Divisional Superintendent.

Tang then became Assistant Commissioner of Police (ACP) in 1999, Senior Assistant Commissioner of Police in March 2002, Deputy Commissioner of Police in December 2003, and as Deputy Commissioner of Police (Operations) took over responsibility for all aspects of the operational policing of the Force. On 16 January 2007, he succeeded Lee Ming-Kwai as the Commissioner of Police.

== Studies ==
- 1989 – Intermediate Command Course at the Bramshill Police Staff College, UK
- 1995 – Henley Management Course, UK
- 1998 – China Studies Course at the Tsinghua University, Beijing
- 1999 – Royal College of Defence Studies, UK
- 2003 – Advanced National Studies Programme at China National School of Administration, Beijing
- 2006 – FBI National Executive Institute

== Awards ==
- 1978 – The Best Team of PTU
- 1994 – Colonial Police Long Service Medal
- 1997 – Hong Kong Police Long Service Medal
- 1998 – Hong Kong Police Medal for Meritorious Service (PMSM)
- 2001 – Hong Kong Police Long Service Medal First Clasps
- 2004 – Hong Kong Police Medal for Distinguished Service (PDSM)
- 2006 – Chief Executive's Commendation for Government/Public Service
- 2007 – Bramshill International Leadership in Policing Award, National Policing Improvement Agency

Police appointments
Preceded by Lee Ming-Kwai	Commissioner of Police of Hong Kong; 2007–2011	Succeeded by Andy Tsang
Order of precedence
Preceded by Jack So; Recipients of the Gold Bauhinia Star	Hong Kong order of precedence Recipients of the Gold Bauhinia Star	Succeeded by Xu Rongmao; Recipients of the Gold Bauhinia Star
