= Raymond Siu =

Former Hong Kong police commissioner

Raymond Siu Chak-yee PDSM PMSM
- 蕭澤頤
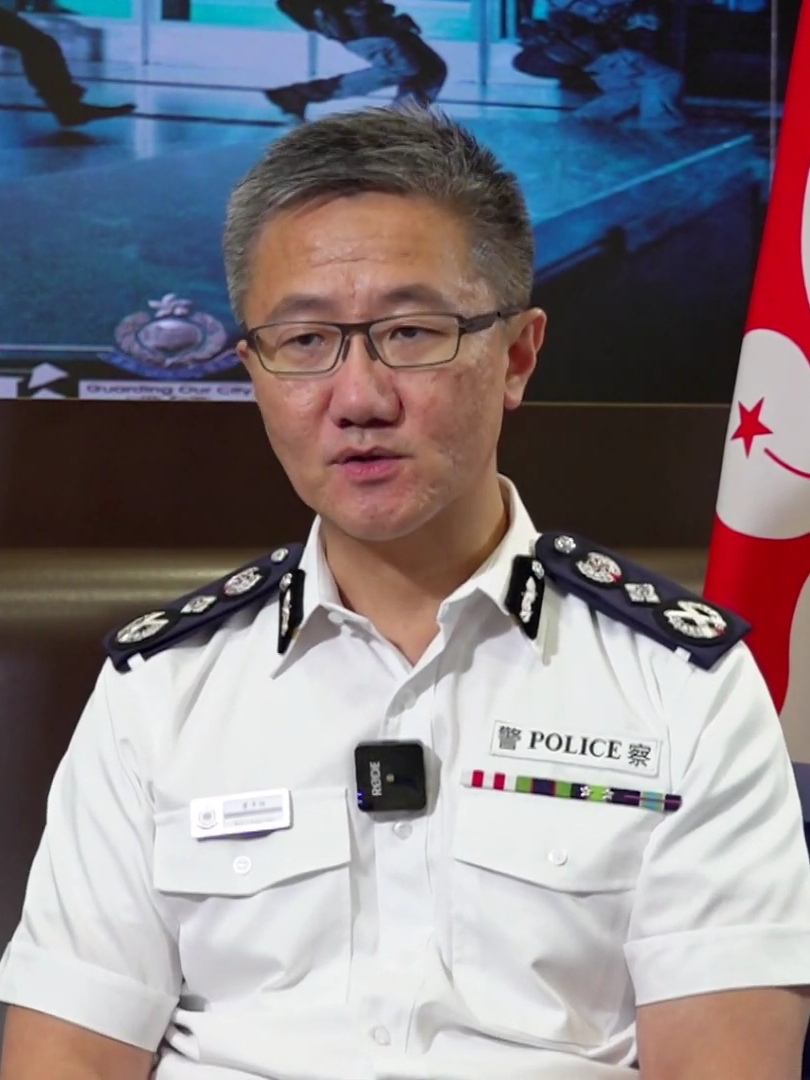

Commissioner of Police
- In office 25 June 2021 – 2 April 2025
- Chief Executive: Carrie Lam; John Lee Ka-chiu
- Preceded by: Chris Tang
- Succeeded by: Joe Chow

Personal details
- Born: Siu Chak-yee; 2 April 1966 (age 60) British Hong Kong
- Education: University of Birmingham (BS)
- Police career
- Department: Hong Kong Police Force
- Service years: 1988–2025
- Rank: Commissioner
- Awards: PDSM; PMSM

Raymond Siu Chak-yee PDSM PMSM (Chinese: 蕭澤頤; born 2 April 1966) is the former Commissioner of Police of the Hong Kong Police from 25 June 2021 to 2 April 2025. He previously served as Deputy Commissioner of Police (Operations) under his predecessor Chris Tang.

== Education ==
Siu received a Bachelor of Science with a course in chemistry from the University of Birmingham in England in 1988.

== Career ==
Siu joined the Royal Hong Kong Police Force as a probationary inspector in December 1988 and had since risen through the ranks, becoming chief superintendent in 2013, assistant commissioner (personnel) in 2017, senior assistant commissioner (director of operations) in 2018 and deputy commissioner (operations) in November 2019.

Siu has served in various posts of different job nature, mostly frontline operational units as well as criminal intelligence-related duties and Personnel Wing. During his career, Siu has attended overseas development courses at various training institutes including Tsinghua University, Stanford University, Harvard University and the Chinese Academy of Governance.

Upon promotion to Senior Superintendent in 2007, Siu served as the Deputy District Commander of Kwai Tsing District and District Commander of Airport District. In 2013, he was promoted to Chief Superintendent and took over the command of Kowloon City District. Upon completion of a tour, he then assumed the post of Chief Superintendent, Human Resources Branch, Personnel Wing.

In January 2017, Siu was promoted to the rank of Assistant Commissioner of Police when he was then assigned to command the Personnel Wing. In November 2018, Siu was promoted to the rank of Senior Assistant Commissioner of Police, taking up the post of Director of Operations. In November 2019, Siu was appointed as Deputy Commissioner of Police (Operations).

=== Commissioner of Police ===
With the nomination and recommendation of Chief Executive Carrie Lam, the State Council appointed Siu as the Commissioner of Police on 25 June 2021, succeeding Chris Tang who was promoted to serve in Carrie Lam's administration as Secretary for Security.

In October 2021, Siu declined to meet with Amber Poon's mother when she invited him to join her for a press conference.

On 5 January 2022, Lam announced new warnings and restrictions against social gathering due to potential COVID-19 outbreaks. One day later, it was discovered that Siu attended a birthday party hosted by Witman Hung Wai-man, with 222 guests. At least one guest tested positive with COVID-19, causing many guests to be quarantined. Sui later said that his attendance was part of community engagement and to meet stakeholders. He was ordered to take leave until 24 January. Later in June 2022, Siu said that he did not break any laws and that he is not interested in alcohol.

On 24 September 2022, Siu said that the threat of terrorists in Hong Kong was at a moderate level, and that there was no specific threats or intelligence that the city was targeted. However, Siu said "We cannot let our guard down. There are still some people going underground and using soft resistance tactics to try to incite people to come out. We will closely monitor our intelligence and see whether such acts are happening online."

In January 2023, Siu said that fake news about police must be corrected within 2 hours, and said that fake news had a big impact on the 2019–20 Hong Kong protests. In February, Siu disagreed with a reporter who asked if police were too focused on the national security law, after reports showed that crime had increased 10% from 2021 to 2022.

On 31 March 2025, two days before Siu's retirement, the United States Department of State announced sanctions on six Chinese and Hong Kong officials including Siu for their role in the crackdown on democracy advocates in Hong Kong. He was sanctioned by the United States for "undermining Hong Kong's protected rights and freedoms."

=== Retirement ===
Siu retired from his position as Commissioner on 2 April 2025.

On 17 July 2026, the United States Treasury deleted the sanctions on nine of the (former) officials in Mainland China and Hong Kong including Raymond Siu, following the ending of state of emergency regarding Hong Kong.

== Personal life ==
In August 2022, Siu tested positive for COVID-19.

Police appointments
Preceded by Chris Tang	Commissioner of Police of Hong Kong; 2021–2025	Next: Joe Chow
Order of precedence
Previous: Simon Peh; Commissioner, Independent Commission Against Corruption	Hong Kong order of precedence Commissioner of Police	Next: John Chu; Director of Audit
