= Chris Tang =

Hong Kong security minister (born 1965)

Chris Tang GBS PDSM JP
- 鄧炳強
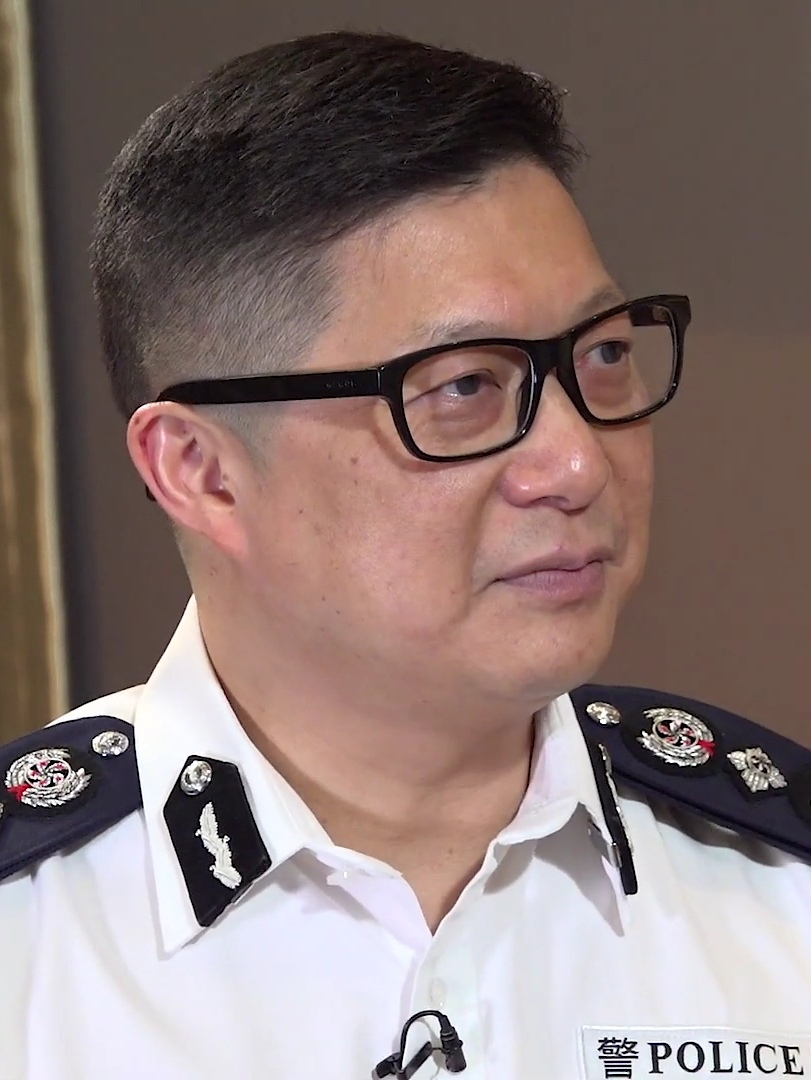

Secretary for Security
- Incumbent
- Assumed office 25 June 2021
- Chief Executive: Carrie Lam; John Lee Ka-chiu
- Preceded by: John Lee Ka-chiu

Commissioner of Police
- In office 18 November 2019 – 25 June 2021
- Chief Executive: Carrie Lam
- Preceded by: Stephen Lo
- Succeeded by: Raymond Siu

Personal details
- Born: Tang Ping-keung; 5 July 1965 (age 61) British Hong Kong
- Education: Chinese University of Hong Kong (BSocSc)
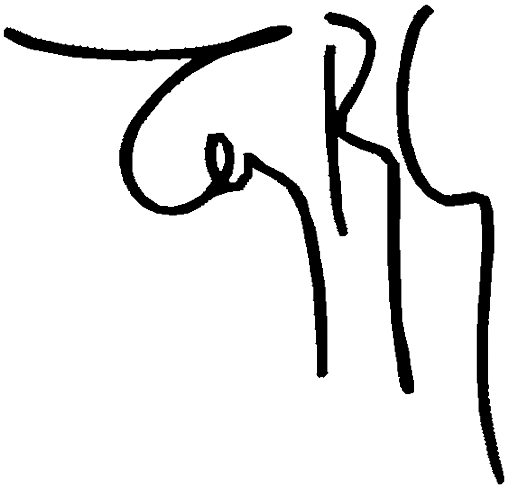
- Signature
- Police career
- Department: Hong Kong Police Force
- Service years: 1987–2021
- Rank: Commissioner
- Awards: Police Distinguished Service Medal (2018)

Chris Tang
- Traditional Chinese: 鄧炳強
- Simplified Chinese: 邓炳强
Transcriptions
Standard Mandarin
- Hanyu Pinyin: Dèng Bǐngqiáng
Yue: Cantonese
- Jyutping: dang6 bing2 koeng4

Chris Tang Ping-keung GBS PDSM JP (Chinese: 鄧炳強; born 5 July 1965) is a Hong Kong law enforcement administrator who has been serving as the Secretary for Security of Hong Kong since June 2021. Tang joined the Hong Kong Police Force in 1987 immediately after his graduation from the Chinese University of Hong Kong with a Bachelor of Social Science in social work. He previously served as the Commissioner of Police of Hong Kong from 2019 to 2021, Deputy Commissioner of Police (Operations) in 2018, and Director of Operations of the Hong Kong Police Force from 2016 to 2018. Tang is sanctioned by the US government, as he is included in the Specially Designated Nationals and Blocked Persons list, pursuant to the Hong Kong Autonomy Act of 2020 - Public Law 116-149.

== Early life and education ==
Tang was born on 5 July 1965 in Hong Kong to a family with roots in Dongguan, Guangdong. He lived in Hong Kong's Western District since he was a child and moved out when he got married.

He received a Bachelor of Social Science with a major in social work from the Chinese University of Hong Kong in 1987. Tang also holds a Master of Business Administration and a master's degree in international security and strategy.

== Career ==
He joined the Royal Hong Kong Police Force in the 1987 as an inspector. He spent many years working in the criminal investigation, international liaison and operational command. He was seconded to the Interpol General Secretariat as a specialised officer from 2006 to 2008, before he was promoted in the organisation as the head of Criminal Organisation and Violent Unit.

In 2015, Tang was appointed Assistant Commissioner of Police and discharged duties as regional commander of Hong Kong Island and Assistant Commissioner, Personnel. He was promoted to the rank of Senior Assistant Commissioner and appointed Director of Operations in January 2017, before he became Deputy Commissioner of Police (Operations) in December 2018. He was awarded the Police Distinguished Service Medal in 2018.

Tang was appointed the Commissioner of Police of Hong Kong by the State Council of China in November 2019, succeeding Stephen Lo amid the widespread 2019–20 Hong Kong protests, at a time when police were under unrelenting criticism for excessive use of force. He was in charge of the police operation code-named Tiderider in response to street protests triggered by the extradition bill since June 2019. He has stated that the police are against having an independent inquiry into allegations of police brutality, which is a key demand from the protesters, and claimed "fake news" was undermining the reputation of his police force. Following Tang's appointment as the Commissioner of Police in November 2019, the police changed its motto from "We serve with pride and care" which had been used for more than 20 years, to "Serving Hong Kong with Honour, Duty and Loyalty." According to the Taiwan News, he "is known as a hardliner in the conflict with the pro-democracy protesters." He has said the violence perpetrated by activists is "very close to terrorism."

On 3 July 2020, Xinhua, a China's national news agency, stated that the Committee for Safeguarding National Security of the Hong Kong Special Administrative Region was formally established with 10 members. As the Commissioner of Hong Kong Police Force, Tang was an ex officio member of the committee.

On 10 February 2021, Carrie Lam awarded Tang the Chief Executive's Commendation for Government/Public Service for his "significant contribution to safeguarding national security and the implementation of the Hong Kong National Security Law." In February 2021, Tang said that he was considering legislation to ban insults to both police officers and public officials.

=== U.S. sanctions ===
In August 2020, Tang and ten other Hong Kong officials were sanctioned by the United States Department of the Treasury under an Executive Order 13936 by President Trump for acts undermining Hong Kong's autonomy. Chris Tang reportedly transferred his mortgage of property in Southern District from HSBC to Bank of China (Hong Kong) three days before sanctions took effect.

Tang was on a Specially Designated Nationals and Blocked Persons list issued by the US State Department on 14 October 2020, of ten individuals who materially contributed to the failure of China to meet its obligations under the Sino–British Joint Declaration and Hong Kong's Basic Law.

== Controversies and views ==
In April 2021, Tang claimed that the United States had used its agents in Hong Kong to stir anti-governmental protests in 2019, and claimed that the protests were not caused by the now-withdrawn extradition bill. Also in April 2021, Tang criticized Apple Daily, stating that the pro-democracy newspaper was spreading fake news and inciting hatred in the city.

In January 2022, Tang claimed that foreign spies were in Hong Kong since 2019 "to foment a 'colour revolution' in Hong Kong" and that new security legislation was needed to "handle espionage acts and offences in a targeted manner to prevent incidents endangering national security".

In March 2022, Tang threatened those who were asked by government officers to isolate at COVID-19 community isolation facilities that "If they refuse to go, they can be fined HK$5,000 or given up to two months in jail. If they leave the facilities during isolation, they can be fined HK$5,000 as well, or face up to six months behind bars".

In April 2022, Chinese style goose stepping was announced to be implemented across the entire force, a year after Tang claimed that the force had "no plans" to change to it.

In August 2022, Tang said that the government will increase the propaganda for national security education.

In September 2022, Tang said that external forces were still present and actively trying to undermine the government.

In November 2022, at the Hong Kong Sevens, Tang was booed and told to "wear a mask" by the crowd.

In November 2022, Tang said that members of lion dance performances should be examined for criminal behavior.

In January 2023, Tang said that no protests had been approved in 3 years due to "health" concerns.

In February 2023, Tang said that some visitors to prisons used their visits to "corrupt" youth and instill hatred of the Hong Kong government into them.

In April 2023, Tang hailed the 100% conviction rate in national security cases. Tang also said that security risks at protests and rallies "certainly exist," after some organizers said "We sincerely urge the authorities to stop exaggerating the risk for demonstrations to be hijacked."

In July 2023, Tang said "Anyone who sees someone with weird facial expressions, muttering and looking ferocious, should notify the police as soon as possible"; the Security Bureau later said this was taken out of context.

In July 2023, Tang said that HK$13 billion budgeted for national security would be kept secret, to prevent people from knowing the government's methods to combat security risks.

In August 2023, Tang said that foreign forces have helped fuel antigovernmental protests since 2003.

In September 2023, after record-breaking floods, Tang was asked why the government waited 30 minutes before issuing a public warning; Tang said that the government was too busy helping those affected in villages, though a villager said he saw no government officials at his village, with the government's Home Affairs Bureau providing no further information when asked about it by SCMP.

=== Article 23 ===
In July 2023, Tang said that the implementation of Article 23 would address "soft resistance" to the government. In addition, after the government announced bounties on 8 democrats outside of Hong Kong, Tang said one fugitive was a "modern-day Chinese traitor" and that the police would spend "a lifetime's endeavour to catch" them. Tang also wrote a letter to The Wall Street Journal after they released an editorial condemning the government's bounties, which said "It's also a reminder that China recognizes no international boundaries to its police state." Tang said that the legislation would cover "modern-day espionage" and "internet loopholes" to combat "soft resistance."

In November 2023, Tang said that the government's security bureau was studying national security legislation from other countries, including democratic countries such as the United Kingdom, Canada, and Australia.

=== Alleged infringement of academic autonomy ===
According to Stand News, Tang sent a letter to Stephen Cheung, the president of the Education University of Hong Kong (EduHK), on 27 April 2020 requesting a follow-up to the speech of Choi Chun-wai (蔡俊威) on RTHK television programme Pentaprism II (左右紅藍綠). Choi's speech mentioned the Siege of the Hong Kong Polytechnic University and criticized the actions of Hong Kong Police, while Tang accused Choi for inciting hatred towards the Hong Kong Police. Democratic Party Legislative Council member Ted Hui expressed concern and stated that he would send a letter to Civil Service Bureau to follow up on Tang's actions. In support of Choi, Pro-democracy group Progressive Scholars Group accused Tang of infringing on academic freedom and autonomy. Choi was also supported by the student unions of 9 universities in Hong Kong, including that of Education University of Hong Kong. On the other hand, the episode received complaints from a total of 347 members of the public. The independent regulatory agency of the Broadcasting Services, Communications Authority (CA), initiated an investigation and commented that "CHOI’s remarks had apparently been distorted, inaccurate information or personal opinions on the Internet without making clear the sources of information… The CA took the view that the host’s remarks made in the programme was irresponsible, and could be regarded as a hate speech with the effect of inciting hatred against the Police, unfair to and were capable of adversely affecting the reputation of the Police." RTHK was subsequently issued a "Serious Warning" by the authority.

=== Hong Kong Journalists Association ===
In September 2021, Tang claimed that the Hong Kong Journalists Association had infiltrated schools to spread anti-governmental political ideas. Afterwards, Tang claimed that he was expressing public opinion, stating "I think I am not making any allegations. I just cast doubt, which is not just from me. I think it's from a large number (of people) of the community. They have the same doubt about the association."

=== Fake news ===
In December 2021, Tang claimed that police officers had never entered school premises during the Siege of the Chinese University of Hong Kong, and that a report was "fake news" for saying that police officers had entered the premises. Photos later showed that police did in fact enter the premises.

In August 2022, Tang said some young people had been "poisoned by fake news" and became anti-government, and suggested increasing publicity and national education to make people proud to be Chinese.

In September 2022, Tang reiterated his desire for an anti-fake news law, saying that some fake news has incited anti-government hatred. He also said that identities of some reporters were vague and there should be a way to distinguish professional reporters.

In February 2024, Tang criticized the HKJA and said "[HKJA] believes anyone can be a reporter. It has counted 13-year-old children, or even those foul-mouthed individuals who made derogatory comments while filming our female officers, as professional reporters. We found it to be unrepresentative, therefore we didn’t reach out to it."

=== Democracy ===
In January 2022, Tang claimed that "The cessation of Apple Daily impressed me the most. This newspaper was poisoning Hongkongers, especially giving the young people a wrong idea about China", and also said that "Since the newspaper has been shut down now, the society will be better and more democratic". Finally, Tang said that "The national security law and the 'patriots administering Hong Kong' principle in the new Legislative Council term marked a new milestone in Hong Kong's democracy."

=== Protest inmates ===
In September 2022, Tang said that inmates who were arrested during the 2019–2020 Hong Kong protests and later convicted were being taught to understand China's history while in prison.

=== 2022 COVID-19 protests in China ===
In November 2022, Tang said that 2022 COVID-19 protests in China that take place in Hong Kong were a "a colour revolution" using "anti-China" social media, and may violate the national security law. Tang said that using words such as "dictatorship" could be seen as endangering national security and violating the law.

=== Hong Kong Alliance in Support of Patriotic Democratic Movements of China ===
In September 2021, Tang said that the Hong Kong Alliance in Support of Patriotic Democratic Movements of China was a foreign agent, but did not provide any evidence or proof. The Alliance said that Tang's "irresponsible accusations" led to the eventual arrest and closure of the Alliance.

=== Glory to Hong Kong ===
In December 2022, Tang appealed to Google to "correct" the search results to list March of the Volunteers instead of Glory to Hong Kong when searching for the national anthem of Hong Kong, and said that the song being the top result hurt the feelings of Hong Kong people. Google refused the request from Tang. After Google explained that search results were based on algorithms, Tang said the explanation was "evasive" and "inconceivable."

=== Comics ===
In April 2023, Tang criticized a comic which discussed the government's plan to spend HK$5.2 billion for the police's Next Generation Communication System (NGCS), with Tang saying the comic was "misleading."

In May 2023, after a satirical comic was suspended following multiple complaints by the government, Tang said comics must be "based on the truth," and that the government must "speak up" to defend against "misleading accusations to incite citizens to vilify the government."

=== Protest ID tags ===
In April 2023, Tang said that a government plan to require ID tags for protestors had critics who "hope to endanger national security," and that the ID tags would be used so that protests cannot be "hijacked" by other people.

=== Tiananmen Square ===
In May 2023, Tang refused to answer a reporter's question, who asked if mourning victims of the Tiananmen Square Massacre would violate the national security law. Later in May 2023, Tang said "It will be a special occasion in a few days' time, many people will use this special occasion to commit acts endangering national security, such as promoting Hong Kong independence and intending to commit subversion," without directly naming the Tiananmen Square massacre event or the people involved with endangering national security.

In response to the Pillar of Shame, Tang in August 2023 claimed that people who seek to endanger national security usually engage in acts under the disguise of "peaceful advocacy" or "artistic creations." Tang also refused to answer when asked if the artist would be arrested upon landing in Hong Kong.

=== Republic of China / Taiwan ===
In September 2021, Tang claimed that celebrations for the Republic of China's Double Ten day could risk breaching the national security law. Tang also claimed that Taiwan is a part of China, and anybody attempting to alter that view would risk being arrested. Many precursors to the Republic of China were based in Hong Kong, including places along the Dr Sun Yat-sen Historical Trail.

==== Tony Chan Tong-kai ====
In October 2021, when the mother of Amber Poon Hiu-wing invited Tang to meet with her, Tang did not show up. Tang blamed Taiwan and said that "Taiwan is part of China. No matter how much Taiwan would like to manipulate politics, they can never change the fact that Taiwan is part of China. I hope Taiwan would stop political manipulation, bring justice to light and allow Chan Tong-kai to go to Taiwan." Poon's mother criticized Tang and said "Their salaries are paid by Hong Kong people, they should fulfil their responsibility, either put Chan Tong-kai on trial in Hong Kong, or put him on a plane for him to surrender in Taiwan."

In September 2022, Tang again blamed "political reasons" for Chan not being able to be sent to Taiwan.

== Filmography ==
In an interview with Clifton Ko, a Hong Kong director, Tang revealed that he, following his schoolmates during university time, worked as a bit part in two of Ko's films to make some money, with a daily salary of HKD700 in 1984.

- Happy Ghost (1984)
- Merry Christmas (1984)
- Special Female Force (2016)
- Guarding Our City (2021)

== Personal life ==
Tang is a voting member of the Hong Kong Jockey Club.

Political offices
Preceded by John Lee Ka-chiu	Secretary for Security; 2021–present	Incumbent
Police appointments
Preceded by Stephen Lo Wai-chung	Commissioner of Police of Hong Kong; 2019-2021	Next: Raymond Siu Chak-yee
Order of precedence
Previous: Christopher Hui; Secretary for Financial Services and the Treasury	Hong Kong order of precedence Secretary for Security	Next: Moses Cheng; Member of the Executive Council
