= Tsang Yam-pui =

Hong Kong police officer (born 1946)

Tsang Yam-pui GBS OBE QPM CPM
- 曾蔭培

Commissioner of Police
- In office 2 January 2001 - 9 December 2003
- Preceded by: Eddie Hui
- Succeeded by: Dick Lee

Personal details
- Born: 11 September 1946 (age 80) British Hong Kong
- Relations: Donald Tsang (brother)

Tsang Yam-pui (simplified Chinese: 曾荫培; traditional Chinese: 曾蔭培; born 11 September 1946) is the former Commissioner of Police of Hong Kong from January 2001 to December 2003. Tsang is also the brother of the former Chief executive Donald Tsang. Their high positions in the government has referred both of them as the "Two high officials". In addition, Tsang's father was also a former Hong Kong police officer.

== Career ==
=== Police ===
Tsang joined the Hong Kong Police in January 1966 as a Probationary Inspector. From 1987 to 1989 he was in charge of the Narcotics bureau. From 1992 to 1994 he was headed the criminal law division, including the commander for Hong Kong island region. In 1995 he was director of crime and security department. From 1996 to 1999 he was deputy commissioner of police. In January 2001, he became the HK Commissioner of Police and retired in December 2003.

=== Property director ===
In May 2004, he joined property firm NWS Holdings, a subsidiary of New World Development, as an executive director. Prior to his brother becoming Chief executive of Hong Kong, there were criticism in 2005 that Tsang Yam-pui moved from a position of highest trust (police commissioner) to an executive of a real estate firm, where the company's profit depend on the government's regulation. Tsang Yam-pui was further appointed as chief executive officer of NWS Holdings between July 2015 to December 2018. From January 2019, he became a non-executive director of the company.

== Honours ==
Tsang was awarded several honours in recognition of his services including the Queen's Police Medal, the Colonial Police Medal, the Order of the British Empire, and the Gold Bauhinia Star in 2003 upon his retirement as the Commissioner of Police.

- United Kingdom :
  - Officer of the Order of the British Empire (OBE)
  - Queen's Police Medal (QPM)
  - Colonial Police Medal (CPM)
  - Colonial Police Long Service Medal (1984)
  - Colonial Police Long Service Medal First Clasps (1991)
  - Colonial Police Long Service Medal Second Clasps (1996)
- Hong Kong :
  - Hong Kong Police Long Service Medal
  - Gold Bauhinia Star (GBS) (2003)

== Controversy ==
=== NWS deal issue ===
As early as June 2003, New World Development wanted to convert the Wan Chai Hong Kong Convention and Exhibition Centre car park into a used car venue. After Tsang Yam-pui became director, and Donald Tsang became chief executive, the demand by New World was approved. Both brothers denied any association to this deal. A NWS spokesman even had to come out to say they were not involved.

=== Hair dye court case ===
As a commissioner, he engaged in a public dispute with a female senior inspector, Sharon Lim, who refused to remove highlights from her hair, which she had dyed since 1987. Tsang's rule of not allowing dyed hair in his police department went into effect in 2001. Lim was one of four policewomen who kept their hair dyed, and the case had to be settled in court.

Police appointments
Preceded by Eddie Hui	Commissioner of Police of Hong Kong; 2001–2003	Succeeded by Lee Ming-kwai
Order of precedence
Preceded by Alice Cheng; Recipients of the Gold Bauhinia Star	Hong Kong order of precedence Recipients of the Gold Bauhinia Star	Succeeded by Eric Li; Recipients of the Gold Bauhinia Star
