= Robert Thomas Mitchell Henry =

Former Commissioner of Police

Robert Thomas Mitchell Henry CBE LVO QPM CPM MStJ

Commissioner of Police of the Royal Hong Kong Police
- In office 1979 - 1985
- Appointed by: Sir Murray MacLehose
- Preceded by: Brian Slevin
- Succeeded by: Raymon Anning

Commissioner of Police of the Fiji Police
- In office 1967 - 1973

Commissioner of Police of the Sarawak Constabulary
- In office 1964 - 1967

Military service
- Branch/service: British Army
- Years of service: 1946-1948
- Rank: Second Lieutenant

Chinese name
- Chinese: 韓義理
Transcriptions
Yue: Cantonese
- Yale Romanization: hon4 yi6 lei5

Robert Thomas Mitchell Henry CBE LVO QPM CPM MStJ (known as Roy Henry; Chinese: 韓義理) was a British Army officer and senior British colonial police administrator in multiple former British colonies, which being the Federation of Malaya, Sarawak, Fiji, and Hong Kong.

== Early military career ==
After leaving school at 18, Roy followed his family tradition by joining the British Army after the Second World War. He was commissioned as a second lieutenant in the Corps of Royal Engineers in December 1946 and was posted to Mandatory Palestine.

== Colonial police career ==
Roy left the army in 1948 and joined the Colonial Police Service as an Assistant Superintendent in the Federation of Malaya Police Force during the Malayan Emergency. Roy was awarded the Colonial Police Medal in 1954 for his services during the Emergency.

In 1956, Roy was promoted to Deputy Superintendent and was transferred to the Sarawak Constabulary in Sarawak on the island of Borneo. He was awarded the Queen's Police Medal as a Senior Superintendent and promoted to Commissioner of Police in 1964.

Roy stayed in the new Malaysia following its separation from Britain as an independent country. Roy was then made a Datuk for his services, the Malaysian equivalent of a Knighthood. In 1967, Roy left Malaysia and was made Officer of the Order of the British Empire. He was appointed as the Commissioner of Police of the Fiji Police in Fiji, where he served until 1973.

After leaving Fiji, Roy was posted to the Royal Hong Kong Police as Director of Operations in the rank of Senior Assistant Commissioner of Police in the same year, and was promoted to Deputy Commissioner of Police in the following year. On 25 March 1979, he was promoted to Commissioner of Police. Roy was later promoted to Commander of the Order of the British Empire in 1983 for his services to the Royal Hong Kong Police. Roy retired in 1985 and was succeeded by Raymon Anning.

Roy was made a Serving Brother of the Order of St John in 1991.

== Personal life ==
Roy was never married. He passed away in Surrey in May 1998.

Police appointments
Preceded by Brian Slevin	Commissioner of Police of Hong Kong; 1979 - 1985	Succeeded by Raymon Anning
