= Medal for Bravery (Bronze) =

Medal for Bravery (Bronze) 銅英勇勳章
- Image of the medal
- Awarded for: exemplary acts of gallantry of a lesser standard then the Medal for Bravery (Silver)
- Presented by: Hong Kong
- Post-nominals: MBB
- Established: 1997
- First award: 1998

Precedence
- Next (higher): Bronze Bauhinia Star
- Next (lower): Meritorious Service Medals

The Medal for Bravery (Bronze) (Chinese: 銅英勇勳章, MBB) is the third Medal for Bravery rank in the honours system of Hong Kong. It is awarded for exemplary acts of gallantry of a lesser standard then the Medal for Bravery (Silver). It was created in 1997 to replace the British honours system after the transfer of sovereignty to the People's Republic of China and the establishment of the Hong Kong Special Administrative Region (HKSAR).

== List of awardees ==
=== 1998 ===
- Mr Ho Fung-cheung, MBB
- Mr Sum Kwong-ho, MBB
- Capt. Trevor Keith Marshall, MBB
- Capt. Tang Sing-tung, Ardis, MBB

=== 1999 ===
- Mr Andrew Grant McCormack, MBB
- Mr Tsang Siu-ping, MBB
- Miss Kwong Lai-yin, MBB

=== 2000 ===
- Mr Wong Chi-fai, MBB
- Captain Barry Kevin Collier, MBB
- Mr Chan Man-tik, MBB
- Mr Cheng Ka-wah, MBB
- Mr Hui Chun-kit, Andy, MBB
- Mr Mak King-yeung, MBB
- Mr Fung Tai-kwong, MBB
- Mr Lo Shu-tsun, MBB

=== 2001 ===
- Ms Wong Suk-wah, MBB
- Ms Yeung Wai-kuen, MBB
- Mr Kwong Kwan-ming, MBB

=== 2003 ===
- Captain Tang Pui-tung, MBB
- Captain Chan Ka-to, MBB
- Mr Fung Yap-wing, MBB
- Mr Mau Yuk-fung, MBB

=== 2004 ===
- Captain Tang Sing-tung, Ardis, MBB
- Mr Choi Chiu-ming, Jimmy, MBB, GMSM
- Mr Li Kin-cheung, Edward, MBB
- Captain Wong Chun-pong, MBB
- Captain Chan Chi-pui, Michael, MBB
- Mr Tsang Chung-bun, MBB
- Mr Yeung Kwong-mo, MBB

=== 2007 ===
- Mr Li Kin-cheung, Edward, MBB
- Mr Cheng Ka-wah, MBB
- Mr Ng Wai-cheong, MBB
- Captain Lee Chun-chi, George, MBB
- Mr Li Kwok-leung, Cally, MBB
- Captain Lam Tak-kan, Dickens, MBB
- Mr Lam Lung-kwan, MBB
- Captain Yuen Yiu-keung, MBB
- Captain Leung Man-chiu, Eric, MBB
- Captain Wong Yiu-hong, MBB

=== 2008 ===
- Mr Cheung Wah-yuk, MBB

=== 2009 ===
- Mr Chan Shu-kei, Marcus, MBB

2010-2014 recipients not yet noted

=== 2015 ===
- Mr Lui Pang-hung, MBB
- Mr Tsang Chi-ho, MBB

=== 2016 ===
- Mr. CHU Wai-man, MBB
- Mr. NG Chi-hung, MBB
- Mr. CHOW Wai-hong, MBB
- Mr. CHAN Chun-yin, MBB
- Mr. TANG Peng-seng, MBB
- Mr. CHAN Ho-fung, MBB
- Mr. CHAN Hin-kei, MBB

=== 2017 ===
- Mr. LEUNG Wai-kong, MBB
- Mr. FONG Chai-chuen, MBB
- Mr. LI Wai-ming, MBB
- Mr. CHEUNG Kam-chuen, MBB
- Mr. LEUNG King-yin, MBB
- Mr. CHEN Yong-lun, MBB
- Mr. YEUNG Siu-fung, MBB
- Mr. LIU Wong-chung, MBB
- Mr. SO Wing-kwan, MBB

=== 2018 ===
- Mr. TSANG Chi-ho, MBB
- Captain WONG Yiu-hong, MBB
- Mr. FOK Wai-fung, MBB, GMSM
- Mr. LI Ngai, MBB
- Mr. LEE Shek-hei, Brian, MBB
- Mr. LIU Kwai-hing, MBB
- Mr. CHOY Chak-man, MBB
- Mr. Zachary Brian ROLFE, MBB

=== 2019 ===
- Mr. LEE Kwun-fat, MBB
- Mr. WOO Kwan-kuen, MBB
- Mr. CHEUNG Man-ho, MBB
- Mr. CHEUNG Ka-wo, MBB
- Mr. KWOK Kar-wo, MBB
- Mr. CHUM Man-kit, MBB
- Mr. CHENG Yui-kwok, Adam, MBB

=== 2020 ===
- Mr. MAN Kwun-san, MBB
- Mr. WU Sui-kit, MBB
- Mr. WAI Tsz-yin, MBB
- Mr. MA Kai-on, MBB
- Mr. CHEUNG Lik-hang, MBB
- Mr. LEUNG Kai-yip, Keith, MBB
- Mr. TSANG Chi-on, MBB
- Mr. WONG Ka-lun, MBB

=== 2021 ===
- Mr. HO Sze-chun, MBB
- Mr. NG Hoi-kin, MBB
- Mr. LEUNG Chi-hang, Janson, MBB
- Mr. CHONG Siu-lung, MBB

=== 2023 ===
- Mr. HO Siu-fai, MBB
- Mr. LI Ying-kit, MBB
- Mr. TSANG Po-ting, MBB
