= Stephen Lo =

Former Commissioner of the Hong Kong Police (born 1961)

Stephen Lo Wai-chung GBS PDSM PMSM JP
- 盧偉聰
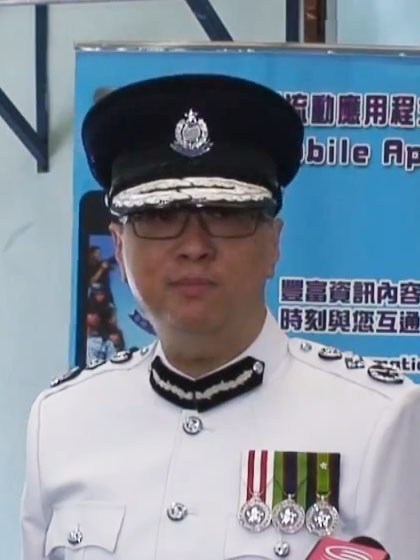

Commissioner of Police
- In office 5 May 2015 – 18 November 2019
- Chief Executive: Leung Chun-ying → Carrie Lam
- Secretary for Security: Lai Tung-kwok → John Lee
- Preceded by: Andy Tsang
- Succeeded by: Chris Tang

Personal details
- Born: 19 November 1961 (age 64) Hong Kong
- Education: University of Hong Kong (BSS)
- Awards: Police Meritorious Service Medal (2009); Police Distinguished Service Medal (2014)

Stephen Lo Wai-chung
- Traditional Chinese: 盧偉聰
- Simplified Chinese: 卢伟聪
Transcriptions
Standard Mandarin
- Hanyu Pinyin: Lú Wěicōng
Yue: Cantonese
- Yale Romanization: Lòuh Wáih chūng
- Jyutping: Lou4 Wai5 cung1

Stephen Lo Wai-chung GBS PDSM PMSM JP (Chinese: 盧偉聰; born 19 November 1961) is a Hong Kong retired law enforcement administrator. Lo joined the Hong Kong Police Force in 1984 after his graduation from the University of Hong Kong with a bachelor of social science in management. He served as the Commissioner of Police of Hong Kong from 2015 to 2019, Deputy Commissioner of Police (Management) from 2013 to 2015, Deputy Commissioner of Police (Operations) in 2013 and Senior Assistant Commissioner of Police from 2011 to 2013.

== Biography ==
Lo attended the University of Hong Kong and received a Bachelor of Social Science with a major in management studies. After his graduation, Lo joined the Royal Hong Kong Police Force on 16 July 1984 as an inspector and was promoted to Senior Inspector on 1 November 1987. He worked at the Regional Crime Unit and Organised Crime and Triad Bureau. He is specialised in "criminal investigation, international liaison, service quality management, security and operational duties," according to the government official website. He also helped the police to develop the first-generation Major Incident and Disaster Support System.

In 1999, he was seconded to the Interpol General Secretariat in Lyon, France, initially as Liaison Officer. In 2001, he was promoted to assistant director of its Asia and South Pacific Branch. Lo returned to Hong Kong in 2003 to take the position of senior superintendent in the Service Quality Wing and the Complaints Against Police Office and was then promoted to chief superintendent in the Security Wing and Deputy Regional Commander in Kowloon West. In 2009, he was promoted to Assistant Commissioner of Police of the Security Wing. He held the position for two years until he was appointed Senior Assistant Commissioner of Police of the Crime and Security Wing in 2011. On 13 August 2013, he was promoted to Deputy Commissioner of Police (Operations) in 2013 and then became Deputy Commissioner of Police (Management) in September 2013.

Lo has also completed a few overseas training programmes, including the command course for police chiefs from the Chinese People's Public Security University in 2004, a management course for senior government officials from Harvard University in 2007, and a leadership development programme from the National Executive Institute of the Federal Bureau of Investigation in the United States in 2010. He also obtained a master's degree in Risk, Crisis & Disaster Management.

He was awarded the Police Meritorious Service Medal in 2009 and the Police Distinguished Service Medal in 2014.

On 4 May 2015, the State Council of the People's Republic of China appointed Lo Commissioner of Police, succeeding Andy Tsang Wai-hung. He was criticised as "soft" and "feeble" by frontline officers after he announced an investigation into the firing of two warning shots by a police officer during the 2016 Mong Kok civil unrest.

On 15 February 2017, Lo stated that he was "saddened" by the guilty verdict of seven police officers who were found guilty of assaulting the pro-democracy activist Ken Tsang during the Occupy Central protests.

In November 2019, Lo retired as Commissioner of Police amidst criticisms of the police's handling of the 2019–20 Hong Kong protests.

In August 2020, Lo and ten other officials were sanctioned by the United States Department of the Treasury under Executive Order 13936 by President Trump for undermining Hong Kong's autonomy.

On 10 February 2021, Carrie Lam awarded Lo the Chief Executive's Commendation for Government/Public Service for his "significant contribution to combatting the social disturbance in 2019 and safeguarding national security".

On 17 July 2026, the United States Treasury deleted the sanctions on nine of the (former) officials in Mainland China and Hong Kong including Stephen Lo, following the ending of state of emergency regarding Hong Kong.

Police appointments
Preceded by Andy Tsang	Commissioner of Police of Hong Kong; 2015–2019	Succeeded by Chris Tang
