= IDSM =

IDSM may refer to:

- The Indian Distinguished Service Medal
- The Hong Kong Immigration Service Medal for Distinguished Service
