= Li Kwan-ha =

Hong Kong Commissioner of Police (1937–2017)

Li Kwan-ha CBE QPM CPM
- 李君夏
- Li as the Commissioner of Police

Commissioner of Police of the Royal Hong Kong Police
- In office 2 December 1989 – 2 July 1994
- Preceded by: Raymon Anning
- Succeeded by: Eddie Hui Ki-on

Personal details
- Born: 3 July 1937 Xinhui County, Guangdong Province, ROC
- Died: 23 January 2017 (aged 79) Queen Mary Hospital, Pok Fu Lam, Hong Kong

Li Kwan-ha (Chinese: 李君夏; 3 July 1937 - 23 January 2017) was the first ethnic Chinese to be the Commissioner of Police in Hong Kong, serving from 1989 to 1994.

== Biography ==
Li was born of Xinhui, ancestry Guangdong on 3 July 1937. He attended King's College and Queen Elizabeth School. He joined the Hong Kong Police Force in 1957 as a Probationary Sub-Inspector. In April 1971, he promoted to Superintendent. He promoted to Chief Superintendent of Police in 1978. He promoted to Assistant Commissioner of Police in 1979.

He was the first Chinese Senior Assistant Commissioner of Police in 1984 and Deputy Commissioner of Police in April 1985. He rose to the rank of Commissioner of Police following the retirement of Raymon Anning in December 1989 and served in the office until his retirement in 1994.

After retiring from the force, Li joined tycoon Li Ka-shing's Cheung Kong (Holdings) and Hutchison Whampoa in 1995 while he was still on pre-retirement leave to advise the firms on security matters, which sparked controversies and led the Hong Kong government to tighten the Civil Service regulations in seeking employment after retirement. In 1996, Li was involved in the kidnapping incident of Li Ka-shing's son Victor Li Tzar-kuoi, and Walter Kwok Ping-sheung, by notorious gangster Cheung Tze-keung, also known as "Big Spender."

During the 1997 handover period, Li became a member of the HKSAR Preparatory Committee and the Chinese People's Political Consultative Conference. He was also a member of the Selection Committee which was responsible for electing the Provisional Legislative Council and the first Chief Executive of the HKSAR in 1996.

Li's wife, whom he met at Queen Elizabeth School, died in November 2007. One of Li's children used to live in Vancouver, Canada but moved back to Hong Kong to keep Li company. The other one is living in London with Li's grandsons.

Li died on 23 January 2017 after collapsing at his home in Pok Fu Lam at the age of 79. He was certified dead after being rushed to Queen Mary Hospital.

== Honours ==
- United Kingdom :
  - Colonial Police Long Service Medal (1975)
  - Recipient of the Colonial Police Medal (CPM) (1980)
  - Colonial Police Long Service Medal first clasps (1982)
  - Recipient of the Queen's Police Medal (QPM) (1985)
  - Colonial Police Long Service Medal second clasps (1987)
  - Commander of the Order of the British Empire (CBE) (1990)

Police appointments
Preceded by Raymon Anning	Commissioner of Police of Hong Kong; 1989-1994	Succeeded by Eddie Hui
