= Andy Tsang =

Andy Tsang Wai-hung GBS PDSM PMSM JP
- 曾偉雄
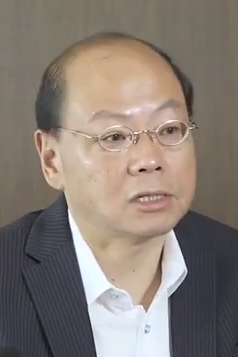

Commissioner of Police
- In office 11 January 2011 – 4 May 2015
- Preceded by: Tang King-shing
- Succeeded by: Stephen Lo

Personal details
- Born: 5 May 1958 (age 68) Hong Kong
- Education: University of Leicester (MBA)
- Nickname: The Vulture

Andy Tsang Wai-hung GBS PDSM PMSM JP (Chinese: 曾偉雄) is the current Deputy Director of the National Narcotics Control Commission of the Ministry of Public Security of China. He was former Commissioner of the Hong Kong Police Force until 4 May 2015. In November 2019, he missed out a top posting with the United Nations despite the strong support from the People's Republic of China.

== Career ==
Tsang joined the Royal Hong Kong Police Force in 1978 as a Probationary Inspector. From 1993 to 1995, he was seconded to the Metropolitan Police Service in London as a Superintendent. He was promoted to Senior Superintendent (Crime – New Territories North Headquarters) in 1996 and to District Commander (Wan Chai) in 1998 with the rank of Chief Superintendent. He was subsequently appointed head of the Organised Crime and Triad Bureau.

In 2003, Tsang was promoted to Assistant Commissioner (Information Systems Wing) in 2003. In February 2005, he was promoted to Senior Assistant Commissioner (Director of Personnel and Training). He was subsequently appointed Director of Operations. He was promoted to Deputy Commissioner (Management) in January 2008 and appointed Deputy Commissioner (Operations) in March 2010.

In January 2011, the Hong Kong government announced that Tsang was to succeed Tang King-shing as Commissioner of Police.

Tsang retired on 4 May 2015, and was replaced by Stephen Lo Wai-chung, promoted from deputy commissioner in charge of force management.

Tsang has been nominated by the Government of the People's Republic of China to fill in the position of Executive Director of the United Nations Office on Drugs and Crime (UNODC) and Director-General of the United Nations Office in Vienna (UNOV) in June 2019, upon Yury Fedotov's retirement after more than 9 years service. If he is appointed, Tsang will become the second person from Hong Kong ever leading a major United Nations component.

After his retirement from the police, Tsang joined Chen Hsong Group as a strategy officer in 2016. In 2018, Tsang was appointed as a non-executive director of Transport International, the parent company of Kowloon Motor Bus and Long Win Bus.

== Controversy ==
=== Fantasy apology ===
Soon after he became commissioner, during the 2011 anti-budget demonstration, an 8-year-old boy was pepper-sprayed in the eye, according to police, accidentally. Under pressure to make an apology on behalf of the police force, Tsang declined, saying any apology is something of a fantasy (天方夜譚).

=== 818 incident ===
On 23 August 2011 there were calls for Andy Tsang to resign following the controversy regarding the visit of Vice Premier Li Keqiang in August 2011 during which student protesters were prevented from making themselves heard in Li's vicinity and detained.

=== Strong police forces against protests ===
Known to be a hard-liner, Tsang's unpopularity is borne out by his nickname, "The Vulture" (Note: “Vulture” (禿鷹) literally means “bald hawk” in Chinese and this nickname was based on the fact that he was bald and his war hawk-style of governance.). Under Tsang, police tactics and handling have come under increased criticism for heavy-handedness; incidents of police harassment of protesters have increased. In particular, since the start of the Umbrella Revolution, police methods and tactics have led to accusations that it has been turned into a political tool by the government, and that the police impartiality is no more; thus the governance system is seeing an erosion of the rule of law in favour of "rule by law", where the police are a mechanism for oppression of citizens. Tsang was conspicuously absent following the eruption of student protests and the start of the Umbrella Revolution where many questions were raised with regard to the Hong Kong Police Force using excessive force on protesters. This prolonged absence prompted speculation that he was gravely ill. Three weeks later, on 18 October 2014, Tsang dispelled concerns that he was deceased after appearing in front of the press to comment on the Occupy Central development. Fung Wai-wah, president of the Professional Teachers' Union, remarked that "the police have made themselves enemy of the people", literally overnight.

== Notes ==
Police appointments
Preceded by Tang King Shing	Commissioner of Police of Hong Kong; 2011-2015	Succeeded by Stephen Lo
