= Francis Badeley =

British police officer (1868–1920)

Captain Superintendent of Police of British Hong Kong
- In office 1902–1913
- Preceded by: Sir Francis Henry May
- Succeeded by: Charles McIlvaine Messer

Personal details
- Born: 27 March 1868
- Died: 21 August 1920 (aged 52) Lowestoft
- Education: Jesus College, Cambridge
- Occupation: Colonial police officer

Francis Joseph Badeley (27 March 1868 – 21 August 1920) was a British colonial police officer who served as Captain Superintendent of Police of British Hong Kong from 1902 to 1913. He was also a member of the Hong Kong legislative council, and Superintendent of the Fire Brigade.

== Early life and education ==
Badeley was born on 27 March 1868 in Aldeby, Norfolk. He was educated at the Clergy Orphan School, Canterbury, and at Jesus College, Cambridge, graduating in 1889 with a degree in Mathematics.

== Career ==
After passing the Eastern cadetship examination in 1890, Badeley joined the colonial service and went to Hong Kong. As required, he studied the Cantonese and Hindustani languages for two years before passing the local examinations, and was appointed acting deputy superintendent of police in 1893. Two years later, he was confirmed as deputy superintendent of police and appointed assistant superintendent of the fire brigade. In 1897, he represented the police at the diamond jubilee celebrations in London. In 1901, he introduced new measures to regulate and control rickishamen. In addition to his police duties, he also served as assistant registrar-general, assistant postmaster-general, assistant colonial secretary and clerk of councils.

In 1902, he was appointed head of the Hong Kong police force as captain superintendent of police and head of the fire brigade. He was a member of the Hong Kong legislative council, and was later appointed to the standing law committee. He was also superintendent of the Hong Kong prison. Following the devastating 1906 Hong Kong typhoon, Badeley was commended for his response by the government. In 1908, he was faced with serious disorder when anti-Japanese rioting broke out. He introduced measures aimed at modernising the police force including finger-printing and the establishment of a register.

In 1913, Badeley resigned on pension and returned to Britain. Described as "a somewhat sudden departure", according to the China Mail commenting on the resignation, "Something drastic was obviously necessary in the organisation of the Hong Kong Police Force in view of recent happenings and disclosures. It is indeed regrettable that, however, some official whose record of service of police work would have inspired confidence in the apparent need of reform has not been appointed."

== Personal life and death ==
Badeley married and had issue. Badeley died suddenly of heart failure on 21 August 1920 at Lowestoft, aged 52.
