= Joe Chow =

Commissioner of Police, Hong Kong

Joe Chow PMSM
- 周一鳴
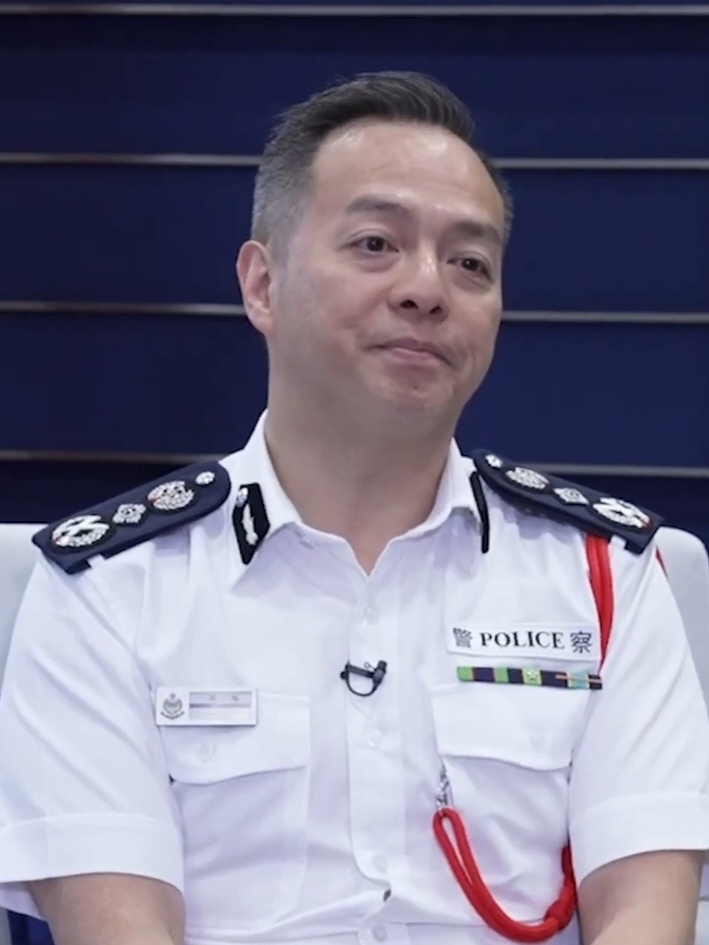
- Chow in 2025

Commissioner of Police
- Incumbent
- Assumed office 2 April 2025
- Chief Executive: John Lee Ka-chiu
- Preceded by: Raymond Siu

Personal details
- Born: 30 November 1972 (age 53) British Hong Kong
- Education: St. Paul's College Hong Kong; Chinese University of Hong Kong (BS); University of Hong Kong (MPA)

Joe Chow Yat-ming, PMSM (Chinese: 周一鳴; born 30 November 1972) is the current Commissioner of Police in Hong Kong since 2 April 2025.

== Career ==
Chow joined the Force in 1995 as an Inspector of Police. He has past experience in criminal investigation, intelligence gathering, and policy-making at many levels. In 2010, Chow was promoted to Superintendent and served in the Crime Wing Headquarters. Between 2012 and 2013, he was seconded to Interpol General Secretariat in Lyon, France as a Criminal Intelligence Officer.

In 2013, soon after Chow got promoted to Senior Superintendent, he took up the office of Criminal Intelligence Bureau as the deputy in command. He later assumed the post of Chief Superintendent and commanded the bureau from 2016.

In 2017, Chow served as the District Commander of Yau Tsim Mong District and was subsequently appointed as the Deputy Regional Commander of Kowloon West Region in early 2019. During his tenure in Kowloon West Region, he handled the Polytechnic University Siege in November 2019. He was promoted to Assistant Commissioner in February 2020 and in charge of the Operations Wing and then the Personnel Wing. In January 2021, he was promoted to Senior Assistant Commissioner and worked as the Director of Personnel and Training. In August 2021, he took up the office of the Director of Crime and Security.

In April 2022, Chow was appointed as the Deputy Commissioner of Police (Management).

On 2 April 2025, Chow was appointed by the State Council of China as the Commissioner of Police.

== Controversies and views ==
In 2019, Chow was the commander of the police operation during the siege of the Hong Kong Polytechnic University. He led officers to block all exits to Hong Kong Polytechnic University and announced that anyone leaving would be arrested for rioting. Additionally, police snipers fired tear gas from the building opposite to the Polytechnic whilst riot police worked on the ground. Rubber bullets were also shot at protesters and volunteer medics who would have otherwise assisted injured protesters had been arrested. Journalists who were leaving the campus during the siege were also lined against the walls, had their belongings searched, and had details of their identity documents and passports recorded.

Upon the end of Polytechnic University Siege, Chow stated that “the force is happy to see that the process has been conducted peacefully, and I want to reiterate that we have always followed two main principles, ‘peaceful resolution’ and ‘flexibility’”. He reiterated that “Police have zero tolerance for violence or lawbreaking, and we will continue to investigate this case”.

== Honours ==
- Hong Kong :
  - Recipient of the Police Medal for Meritorious Service (PMSM) (2021)
  - Police Long Service Medal First Claps (2020)
  - Recipient of the Police Long Service Medal (2013)
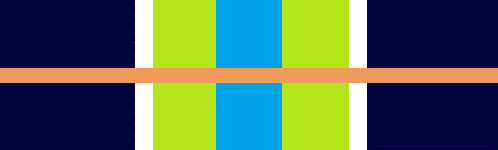
  - Tide Rider Medal Courage (2020)
  - Chief Executive's Commendation for Public Service (2020)

Police appointments
| Preceded by Raymond Siu | Commissioner of Police of Hong Kong; 2025–Present | Next: Incumbent |
