= Raymon Anning =

Commissioner of Police (1930–2020)

Raymon Harry Anning CBE, QPM, CBIM
- Anning as the Commissioner of Police

Commissioner of Police of the Royal Hong Kong Police
- In office 15 April 1985 – 1 December 1989
- Governor: David Clive Wilson
- Preceded by: Robert Thomas Mitchell Henry
- Succeeded by: Li Kwan Ha

Personal details
- Born: 22 July 1930
- Died: 20 December 2020 (aged 90)
- Education: Richmond and East Sheen County Grammar School for Boys
- Profession: Police, civil servant

Chinese name
- Traditional Chinese: 顏理國
Transcriptions
Yue: Cantonese
- Yale Romanization: ngaan4 lei5 gwok3

Raymon Harry Anning CBE QPM (Chinese: 顏理國, 22 July 1930 – 20 December 2020) was a Commissioner of Police of the Royal Hong Kong Police in Hong Kong. In the early 1970s, he was a commander of the Metropolitan Police in Greater London. He was later appointed as HM Inspector of Constabulary for West and South-West England, the British Midlands and Wales. In 1983, he was posted to Hong Kong as Deputy Commissioner of Police (Operations) until his promotion to Commissioner in 1985.

== Early life ==
As a teenager, Anning was educated in Richmond and East Sheen County Grammar School for Boys, East Sheen, Greater London.

== Police career ==
Curriculum vitæ
- 1952 Joined Metropolitan Police
- 1969 Chief Superintendent, Anguilla London contingent and Discipline Office
- 1973 Commander, A10 Branch of New Scotland Yard
- 1975 Deputy Assistant Commissioner, Criminal Investigation Department
- 1975 Received Queen's Police Medal for Distinguished Service
- 1979 HM Inspector of Constabulary for England and Wales
- 1980 Companion, British Institute of Management
- 1982 Commander of the Order of the British Empire
- 1983 Deputy Commissioner of Police (Operations), Royal Hong Kong Police
- 1985 Commissioner of Police, Royal Hong Kong Police
- 1989 Retired

Anning joined the Metropolitan Police in 1952.

He was promoted to Chief Superintendent in 1969 and placed in command of a contingent of London policemen to restore order to Anguilla, which declared itself an independent republic. On return from Anguilla he commanded the Metropolitan Police Discipline Office.

In 1973, Commissioner of the Metropolitan Police Sir Robert Mark encountered an increasing concern about police corruption and behaviour. Detectives had been offered money to ignore crimes. Anning, then promoted to Commander, was placed in charge of a complaints department in New Scotland Yard, with a codename A10, to investigate all complaints against the members of the force. Under Anning's command were 60 men (40 CID men and 20 uniformed officers) which later increased to 84. In its first sixth month, the new department investigated 451 complaints. At last, 90 officers were forced out. Fresh from his experience in New Scotland Yard, Anning was seconded to Hong Kong to advise the Government on the founding of the Independent Commission Against Corruption.

On his return from Hong Kong in 1975, Anning was promoted to Deputy Assistant Commissioner, second-in-command of the Criminal Investigation Department, Metropolitan Police.

In 1979, Anning undertook a course at the National Executive Institute of the FBI Academy and was appointed one of Her Majesty's Inspectors of Constabulary for England and Wales.

On 17 July 1983 Anning replaced Peter Moor and took up his appointment as Deputy Commissioner of Police (Operations) of the Royal Hong Kong Police.

Anning became Commissioner of Police on 15 April 1985. Prior to the end of his office, Anning faced the instability created by the 1989 Tiananmen Square Protests. On the morning of 7 June, following a slow demonstration march of trucks and lorries, rioters gathered at Mong Kok and Yaumatei and destroyed nearby vehicles and building gates. PTU officers were called to action to control the situation. Police fired about 40 shots of tear gas and arrested about 10 rioters. Anning later declared that the rioters were criminals whose actual motive was not to support the protests at Tiananmen Square.

== Retirement ==
Anning was succeeded by Li Kwan Ha under instructions from Foreign Secretary Douglas Hurd and approval of Governor Sir David Wilson in 1989. He was the last Briton in the post of Hong Kong Police Commissioner.

== Awards and honours ==
- 1975 – Queen's Police Medal for Distinguished Service
- 1980 – Companion, British Institute of Management
- 1982 – Commander of the Order of British Empire

== See also ==
- Her Majesty's Inspectorate of Constabulary
- History of Anguilla
- Hong Kong Police Force
- Metropolitan Police Service
- Robert Mark
- Tiananmen Square protests of 1989

Police appointments
Preceded by Robert Thomas Mitchell Henry	Commissioner of Police of Hong Kong; 1985–1989	Succeeded by Li Kwan Ha
