= Hong Kong 818 incident =

Police lockdown of University of Hong Kong (2011)

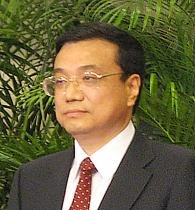
Li Keqiang, Chinese Premier. He was Vice Premier at the time of the incident.

The Hong Kong 818 incident (Chinese: 香港818事件) was a case of alleged civil rights violations that occurred on 18 August 2011 at the University of Hong Kong during a visit by Li Keqiang, the then-Vice Premier of the People's Republic of China. His arrival at the school led to a lock-down and complete takeover of the school by the Hong Kong Police force. Controversy arose as a result of claims by the media and students that their rights had been violated.

== Li Keqiang's visit ==
On 16 August 2011 Li Keqiang began a three-day visit to promote development between Hong Kong and Mainland China. His itinerary included promoting the inclusion of Hong Kong in the Communist party 12th Five Year-Plan to promote financial co-operation. Li said he came to Hong Kong to "walk around more, look around more and listen more" (多走走、多看看、多聽聽) to the local people's concerns. He first visited the Hong Kong Housing Authority headquarters and a centre for the elderly to emphasise the overpriced housing market and ageing population as the two top issues.

On 18 August, the last day of the three-day visit, Li visited the University of Hong Kong as part of the university's 100th anniversary celebrations. To provide security for the event, the Hong Kong Police, led by Commissioner Andy Tsang Wai-hung, assumed control of the school and created a core security zone that prevented anyone from approaching Li.

== Incident ==
=== School lockdown ===
During Li's visit, the school was placed into lockdown by the police. Students and alumni were kept far away during his visit. Three students who attempted to approach Li were blocked by police and thrown to the ground:

Students involved in the incident:

- Wong Kai-hing (黃佳鑫), of Hong Kong Polytechnic University
- Tang Kin-wa (鄧建華), of Lingnan University
- Samuel Li Shing-hong (李成康) of University of Hong Kong

Samuel Li in particular was dragged off and locked up in a staircase for an hour. According to Johannes Chan, the Dean of the Faculty of Law at HKU, keeping the students in the zone constituted false imprisonment and could be the basis for a civil suit against the police.

Samuel Li argued that the school president did not care about the students and demanded an apology. Before the school president Tsui Lap-chee could offer an apology, Li stormed out of the room. The Hong Kong Journalists Association accused the police of hampering media coverage and violated their freedom of expression, as journalists were kept far away from Li Keqiang.

In a statement to the HKU community, president Tsui admitted that the security arrangements could have been better planned and organised, and apologised to the university's students and alumni for not having been able to prevent the unhappy incident. He assured them that "the University campus belongs to students and teachers, and that it will always remain a place for freedom of expression".

=== The ceremony ===
At 18 Aug ceremony, Li Keqiang was seated in the Chancellor's chair, a symbol of the highest authority in the university.

David Wilson, one of the two keynote speakers (the other being Li Keqiang) and the second-to-last pre-handover governor of Hong Kong, was given a seat in the second row. In the introduction, Sir David was referred to only as an alumnus of HKU. The fact that he was both a former governor of Hong Kong and a former chancellor of HKU was not mentioned.

=== August protests ===
About 48 hours after Li Keqiang's departure, 300 members of the Hong Kong Journalists Association dressed in black and protested outside the police headquarters in Central.

On the night of 26 August, a group of 1000 teachers, students, and regular citizens gathered on the campus's Zhongshan square to protest against the 818 incident and conduct a candlelight vigil. In response, school president Tsui claimed that the liberties and freedom of HKU and its students were not violated and that he would not participate in the rally. The crowd started booing him and demanded he stepped down. Following the protest at the square, a smaller group of 200 participants marched to the West District Police Station.

About 270 HKU alumni purchased a full-page newspaper advertisement to condemn police security arrangements. The sponsors included former ICAC commissioner Fanny Law, Liberal party vice chairwomen Selina Chow, former Hospital Authority HR director Dr Ko Wing-man, and Pro-Beijing camp Democratic Alliance for the Betterment and Progress of Hong Kong member Choy So-yuk. Over 1,500 people signed another statement calling for police commissioner Andy Tsang to resign.

=== Police testimony ===
During a meeting on 29 August, Andy Tsang said the students refused to leave, lingering in the staircase, and directed profanities at the officers. As to the camera blocking incident on 17 August, Tsang said the police officer saw a "dark shadow" carrying a "black object" and the officer "instinctively" used his hands to block the object. According to Tsang, the officer's hand got "stuck" in the object, and he did not set out to block the camera deliberately. Now TV aired videos of the incident and claimed that his remarks did not match up to the footage. Legislator Lee Wing-tat called for Tsang's resignation if his claims were proven false.

=== 3 September protest ===
A march was held from Wan Chai on 3 September against the action of the police. The protest had 800 people including those who wore V for Vendetta masks. Many citizens in the march were screaming for police commissioner Andy Tsang to step down. The protest was set up by the post-80s generation. A giant 8 x 20-metre black cloth was used to cover the front of the police headquarters. This signifies the dark shadow that is being cast and to satirise Tsang's "dark shadow/hand stuck" testimony in Legco.

Further analysis said that the handling of the whole incident is a disappointment to the One country, two systems. About whether civil rights were violated Henry Tang said "it was completely rubbish". He has since been criticised about the statement made.

== Other issues ==
Confusion arose initially as to whether the school had invited Li Keqiang to its campus or if he had invited himself. School president Tsui Lap-chee later admitted in a public statement that he himself had invited Li.

On 17 August, a day prior to the 818 incident, a Laguna City resident wearing a T-shirt with the Tiananmen square 4 June protest slogan was removed by police before Li's arrival to visit a civil servant. Police later claimed the man had been arrested for jaywalking in 2006. NOW TV was filming the incident but their camera was blocked by police officers. Raymond Wong Yuk-man later threw the same T-shirt at the police commissioner's face during a meeting in the Legislative Council.

Also on 17 August, Leung Kwok-hung tried to get a demonstration going at the hotel where Li and Donald Tsang were having dinner. Li Dak-wa (李德華), the driver of the protest van was supposed to transport equipment like microphones to the hotel. He was intercepted by the police and then surrounded by 5 to 6 policemen who forced him to do a public full inspection of his car.

Between 2000 and 3000 police officers were deployed for the visit.

Asia Times Online argued that the incident had tarnished the image of the school, which was ranked No 1 in Asia and 21st in the world in 2010–11 according to the Times Higher Education World University Rankings.

After the incident the special administrative chiefs Donald Tsang and Fernando Chui met Li Keqiang in Urumqi for the China-Eurasia Expo meeting, and HK journalists were no longer allowed near Li any more.

As an official function of HKU, the centenary ceremony should have been open to all HKU alumni. Yet only pro-Beijing camp members were invited. Missing was Anson Chan, who served as Chief Secretary both before and after the 1997 handover. Another was Martin Lee, a pro-democracy advocate. Instead, the invited guests included real estate tycoons Li Ka-shing and Lee Shau-kee, as well as casino tycoon Stanley Ho, who occupied front row seats, this despite Li Keqiang naming Hong Kong's unaffordable housing as a key concern during his visit.

In October 2011, school president Tsui Lap-chee announced his intention to step down from his position, but did not give a reason related to these events.

== See also ==
- Police misconduct allegations during the 2019–2020 Hong Kong protests
- Human rights in Hong Kong
