= Edward Wolfe (police officer) =

British police officer (1875–1952)

Edward Wolfe CMG
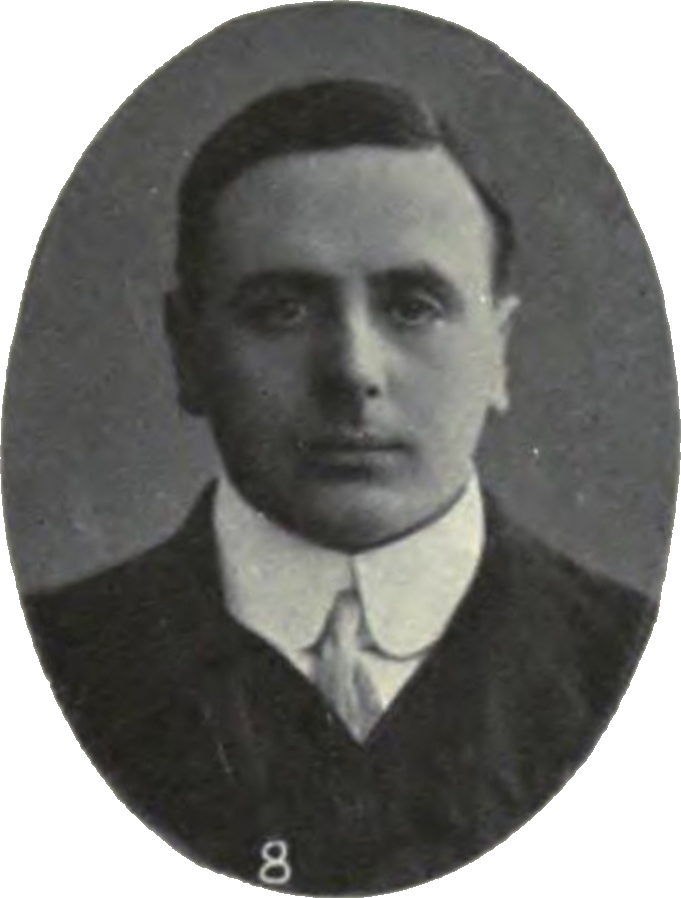

Captain Superintendent of Police-Inspector General of Police of British Hong Kong
- In office 1918–1934
- Preceded by: Charles Messer
- Succeeded by: Thomas Henry King

Postmaster-General of Hong Kong
- In office 1913–1917
- Preceded by: Charles Messer
- Succeeded by: Stewart Buckle Carne Ross

President of the Sanitary Board of Hong Kong
- In office 1909–1913

Personal details
- Born: 3 May 1875
- Died: 4 December 1952 (aged 77)
- Education: Caius College, Cambridge
- Occupation: Colonial police officer

Edward Dudley Corscaden Wolfe (3 May 1875 – 4 December 1952) was a British colonial police officer who served as Captain Superintendent of Police-Inspector General of British Hong Kong from 1918 to 1934. He was a member of the Legislative Council of Hong Kong from 1919 to 1935, and also president of the Sanitary Board, and Postmaster-General.

== Early life and education ==
Wolfe was born at Birkenhead on 3 May 1875, the son of Thomas Wolfe, a merchant of Birkenhead and Marion née Downs. He was educated at Tonbridge School and Caius College, Cambridge where he graduated in 1897.

== Career ==
Wolfe entered the colonial service in 1897, and was appointed a cadet in the Federated Malay States Police. In 1901, he was transferred to Hong Kong, and served in various posts including in succession, collector of rents; registrar of the Land Court; assistant registrar-general; and magistrate. He then spent two years on secondment in the Transvaal Colony as an emigration agent.

On returning to Hong Kong in 1907, he was appointed inspector of schools; in 1909, president of the Sanitary Board; and in 1913, Postmaster-General. From 1914 to 1916, he was acting colonial treasurer and then custodian of enemy property from 1916 to 1918.

In 1918, he was appointed head of the Hong Kong Police force as Captain-Superintendent of Police, and upon a change in title, as Inspector General of Police in 1930, a post he held until 1934. He was also Superintendent of the Hong Kong Fire Brigade for over ten years, and in 1921, was briefly acting colonial secretary. He was a member of the Legislative Council from 1919 to 1935. He retired in 1935.

== Personal life and death ==
Wolfe married in 1910, Agnes Catherine Chatham, daughter of William Chatham, director of Public Works of Hong Kong. He died on 4 December 1952, aged 77.

== Honours ==
Wolfe was appointed Companion of the Order of St Michael and St George (CMG) in the 1928 New Year Honours.

Police appointments
Preceded by Charles Messer	Captain Superintendent of Police-Inspector General of Police; 1918–1934	Succeeded by Thomas Henry King
