= Way Kuo =

Taiwanese nuclear engineer

- Born: 5 January 1951 (age 75); Taipei, Taiwan
- Education: National Tsing Hua University (BS); Kansas State University (PhD)
- Known for: President of the City University of Hong Kong
- Scientific career
- Fields: Engineering
- Workplaces: Bell Labs; Texas A&M University; University of Tennessee

Way Kuo (Chinese: 郭位; pinyin: Guō Wèi; born 5 January 1951 in Taipei, Taiwan) is the fourth President of the City University of Hong Kong and University Distinguished Professor of the City University of Hong Kong. Before joining CityU, he was University Distinguished Professor and Dean of Engineering at the University of Tennessee.

Kuo received his PhD degree in engineering in 1980 from Kansas State University and BS degree in nuclear engineering in 1972 from the National Tsing-Hua University in Taiwan.

Kuo is a foreign member of the Chinese Academy of Engineering. He was elected a member of the US National Academy of Engineering in 2000 for his contributions to reliability design for microelectronics products and systems. He is also a member of Academia Sinica in Taiwan and International Academy for Quality. He is a Fellow of the American Society for Quality (ASQ), Institute of Electrical and Electronics Engineers (IEEE), Institute for Operations Research and the Management Sciences (INFORMS), American Statistical Association (ASA), and Institute of Industrial Engineers (IIE).

Academic offices
Preceded by Richard Ho Yan-ki; Acting	President of the City University of Hong Kong; 14 May 2008 – 17 May 2023	Succeeded by Freddy Boey
