= Charles McIlvaine Messer =

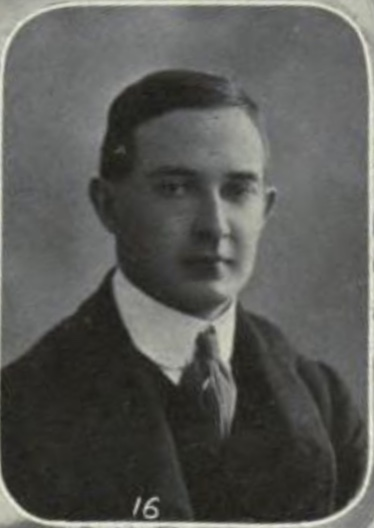
Charles McIlvaine Messer (January 1, 1908)

Charles McIlvaine Messer, OBE (11 October 1874 – 26 July 1938) was the Captain Superintendent of the Hong Kong Police Force from 1913 to 1918 and Colonial Treasurer of Hong Kong from 1918 to 1931.

He was born on 11 October 1874 in London to Josiah Messer. He was Captain Superintendent of the Hong Kong Police Force from 1913 to 1918. He was appointed Colonial Treasurer of Hong Kong in 1918. Before that he had acted as Colonial Treasurer for six occasions. He served as Colonial Treasurer until he retired in 1931.

He died on 26 Jul 1938 in Iffley, Oxford.

Police appointments
| Preceded by Francis Badeley | Captain Superintendent of Police; 1913–1918 | Succeeded by Edward Dudley Corscaden Wolfe |
Government offices
| Preceded by Alexander MacDonald Thomson | Colonial Treasurer of Hong Kong; 1918–1931 | Succeeded by Edwin Taylor |
