= Commissioner of Police (Hong Kong) =

Head of the Hong Kong police force

Commissioner of Police 警務處處長
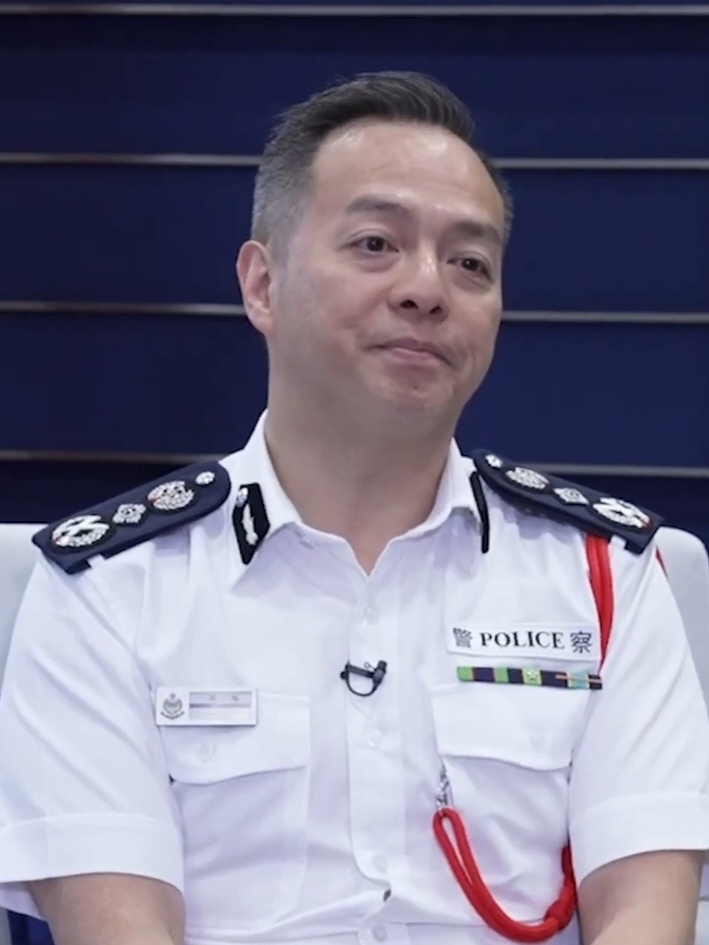
- Incumbent; Joe Chow since 2 April 2025
- Security Bureau
- Style: The Honourable
- Appointer: Central People's Government (via nomination by the Chief Executive)
- Inaugural holder: Eddie Hui
- Formation: 1 July 1997
- Website: Hong Kong Police Force

Commissioner of Police
- Traditional Chinese: 警務處處長
- Simplified Chinese: 警务处处长
Transcriptions
Standard Mandarin
- Hanyu Pinyin: Jǐngwùchù Chùzhǎng
Yue: Cantonese
- Yale Romanization: Gíng mouh chyu chyu jéung
- Jyutping: Ging2 mou6 cyu3 cyu3 zoeng2

The Commissioner of Police (Chinese: 警務處處長) heads the Hong Kong Police Force and, in accordance with Section 4 of the Police Force Ordinance, reports to the chief executive of Hong Kong and the Security Bureau. The current commissioner is Joe Chow Yat Ming, appointed by the State Council of China on 2 April 2025.

== Officers in command ==
Commissioners of Police currently are mandated to retire before they reach the age of 58, but may be extended upon exceptional circumstances.

Early heads were often military officers or had previous policing experience in the United Kingdom or other British colonies. Many joined the Force in senior command postings before their promotions. Li is the only Commissioner to rise from lower ranks (as Probationary Sub-Inspector) and Hui joined as a probationary Inspector.

List of heads of Hong Kong Police Force
Portrait	Name	Took office	Left office	Length of Tenure	Notes
Under British rule
Chief Magistrates and Chief of Police
	William Caine	30 April 1841	1844		Captain
	George Thomas Haly	Feb 1844			Captain; Acting Superintendent of Police and officer with the 41st Madras Native Infantry
	John Bruce	Mar 1844			Acting Superintendent of Police and officer with the 18th Royal Irish
Captain Superintendent of Police
	Charles May	1844/45?	1860/62?		Superintendent of A Division of the Metropolitan Police
	Edmund Haythorne	1860	1862		British Army officer
	William Quinn	1862	1866/67?		Member of Bombay Police and first police officer to head Hong Kong Police
	Walter Meredith Deane	1866/67?	1892		Cadet Officer from Britain sent to head force
	Alexander H. Adam Gordon	1892	1893		Major-General; Superintendent of Victoria Gaol
	Francis Henry May	1893	1901/02?		Cadet Officer and the Assistant Colonial Secretary
	Francis Joseph Badeley	1902	1913		Cadet Officer and Colonial civil servant
	Charles Messer	1913	1918		Cadet Officer and Colonial civil servant
	Edward Dudley Corscaden Wolfe	1918	1930		Cadet Officer and Colonial civil servant
Inspector General of Police
	Edward Dudley Corscaden Wolfe	1930	1934		
	Thomas Henry King	1934	1935/38?		Cadet Officer and Colonial civil servant
Commissioner of Police
	Thomas Henry King	1935/38?	1940/41?		
	John Pennefather-Evans	April 1940/1941?	25 December 1941		served in the police force of the Federated Malay States
Under Japanese Rule
Captain of the Hong Kong Kempeitai
	Kennosuke Noma	25 December 1941	18 January 1945		Executed as a war criminal in 1947
Under British rule
Commissioner of Police
	Charles Henry Sansom	1945	1946		Colonel; British Military Administration
	Duncan William McIntosh	1946	1954		former Deputy Commissioner of Police of Singapore
	Arthur Crawford Maxwell	1954	1959		police officer in Malaya and Commissioner of Police of Sarawak in 1947–1949; Deputy Commissioner with Hong Kong Force in 1949
	Henry Wylde Edwards Heath	1 April 1959	18 December 1966		Member of Hong Kong Force
	Edward Tyrer	19 December 1966	21 July 1967		Member of Hong Kong Force
	Edward C. Eates	22 July 1967	1969		joined force in 1963 as Assistant Commissioner following police service in Pakistan, Sierra Leone and Gambia
	Charles Payne Sutcliffe	1969	13 January 1974		previous served in Metropolitan Police, Tanganyika; joined Hong Kong Police as Assistant Commissioner in 1960
	Brian Slevin	14 January 1974	25 March 1979		formerly Deputy Commissioner
	Roy Henry	25 March 1979	15 April 1985		joined force in 1973; previous colonial police officer in Malaysia and Commissioner of Police in Fiji
	Raymon Anning	15 April 1985	1 December 1989		served with Metropolitan Police and other British forces; joined Hong Kong Police in 1983
	Li Kwan-ha	2 December 1989	2 July 1994		joined force as Probationary Sub-Inspector in 1957
	Eddie Hui	3 July 1994	30 June 1997		joined force as Probationary Inspector
Under Chinese rule
Commissioner of Police
	Eddie Hui	1 July 1997	1 January 2001	3 years and 185 days	
	Tsang Yam-pui	2 January 2001	9 December 2003	2 years and 342 days	
	Lee Ming-kwai	10 December 2003	15 January 2007	3 years and 37 days	
	Tang King-shing	16 January 2007	10 January 2011	3 years and 360 days	
	Andy Tsang	11 January 2011	4 May 2015	4 years and 114 days	
	Stephen Lo	5 May 2015	18 November 2019	4 years and 198 days	
	Chris Tang	19 November 2019	25 June 2021	1 year and 219 days	
	Raymond Siu	25 June 2021	2 April 2025	3 years and 282 days	
	Joe Chow	2 April 2025	Incumbent	1 year and 205 days	
