= Order of precedence in Hong Kong =

Relative preeminence of officials for ceremonial purposes

The Hong Kong order of precedence is a nominal and symbolic hierarchy of important positions within the Government of Hong Kong. Administered by the government's Protocol Division, the hierarchy does not determine the order of succession for the office of Chief Executive, which is instead specified by the Basic Law of Hong Kong.

As a special administrative region of the People's Republic of China, Hong Kong theoretically maintains autonomy on all affairs other than defence and foreign relations. Reflecting that status, the order of precedence does not include party and state leaders of the Chinese Communist Party (CCP). Government officials from mainland China are generally treated as special guests when attending Hong Kong government functions.

== Hong Kong SAR order of precedence ==
1. Chief Executive (John Lee, GBM, SBS, PDSM)
2. Chief Justice of the Court of Final Appeal (Andrew Cheung, GBM)
3. Former Chief Executives
  1. Donald Tsang, GBM
  2. Leung Chun-ying^{a}, GBM, GBS, JP
  3. Carrie Lam, GBM, GBS, JP
4. Chief Secretary for Administration (Eric Chan, GBS, IDSM, JP)
5. Financial Secretary (Paul Chan, GBM, GBS, MH, JP)
6. Secretary for Justice (Paul Lam, SBS, SC, JP)
7. President of the Legislative Council and Members of the Executive Council:
  1. President of the Legislative Council (Starry Lee, GBS, JP)
  2. Convenor of the Executive Council (Regina Ip, GBM, GBS, JP)
  3. Deputy Chief Secretary for Administration (Warner Cheuk, GBS)
  4. Deputy Financial Secretary (Michael Wong, GBS, JP)
  5. Deputy Secretary for Justice (Horace Cheung, SBS, JP)
  6. Other members of the Executive Council
8. Other principal officials:
  1. Commissioner, Independent Commission Against Corruption (Woo Yong-ming, SBS, CSDSM)
  2. Commissioner of Police (Joe Chow Yat-ming, PMSM)
  3. Director of Audit (Nelson Lam, JP)
  4. Director of Immigration (Au Ka-wang, IDSM)
  5. Commissioner of Customs and Excise (Chan Tsz-tat, CDSM)
9. Other members of the Court of Final Appeal and Chief Judge of the High Court:
  1. Permanent Judges of the Court of Final Appeal:
    1. Robert Ribeiro, GBM
    2. Joseph Fok
    3. Johnson Lam
  2. Non-Permanent Judges of the Court of Final Appeal:
    1. Frank Stock GBS, JP
    2. Kemal Bokhary GBM, JP
    3. Patrick Chan Siu-oi GBM
    4. Robert Tang GBM, SBS, JP
    5. The Lord Hoffmann GBS
    6. The Lord Neuberger of Abbotsbury GBS
    7. Patrick Keane AC
    8. James Allsop AC
  3. Chief Judge of the High Court (Jeremy Poon)
10. Other members of the Legislative Council
11. Consuls-General (Foreign country diplomats to Hong Kong)
12. Religious leaders:
  1. Anglican Archbishop of Hong Kong Sheng Kung Hui (Andrew Chan)
  2. President of the Hong Kong Buddhist Association (Kuan Yun, MH)
  3. Catholic Bishop of Hong Kong (Stephen Chow)
  4. President of the Confucian Academy (Tong Yun-kai, SBS)
  5. Chairman of the Chinese Muslim Cultural and Fraternal Association (Ali Tuet)
  6. Chairman of the Hong Kong Christian Council (Wong Ka-fai)
  7. Chairman of the Hong Kong Taoist Association (Leung Tak-wah, BBS, MH)
13. Recipients of the Grand Bauhinia Medal
14. Heads of universities
  1. President of the City University of Hong Kong (Freddy Boey)
  2. President and Vice-Chancellor of the Hong Kong Baptist University (Alexander Wai, JP)
  3. President of the Hong Kong Metropolitan University (Paul Lam, SBS, JP)
  4. President of the Hong Kong Shue Yan University (Henry Hu^{d})
  5. President of the Lingnan University (S Joe Qin)
  6. Vice-Chancellor and President of the Chinese University of Hong Kong (Dennis Lo)
  7. President of the Education University of Hong Kong (John Lee Chi-kin)
  8. President of the Hang Seng University of Hong Kong (Simon Ho)
  9. President of the Hong Kong Polytechnic University (Jin-Guang Teng, JP)
  10. President of the Hong Kong University of Science and Technology (Nancy Ip, SBS, MH, JP)
  11. Vice-Chancellor and President the University of Hong Kong (Xiang Zhang, JP)
15. Other members of the High Court:
  1. Justices of Appeal of the Court of Appeal
  2. Judges of the Court of First Instance
16. Public commissioners:
  1. Chairman of the Public Service Commission (Maisie Cheng, GBS, JP)
  2. The Ombudsman (Jack Chan)
17. Consuls-in-Charge/Honorary Consuls (Foreign country diplomats to Hong Kong)
18. Permanent Secretaries, Under Secretaries and Officials of Directorate Grade 6 Rank and above
19. Judges of the District Court:
  1. Chief District Judge (Justin Ko)
  2. Principal Family Court Judge (Chan Chan-kok)
  3. Other District Judges
20. Recipients of the Gold Bauhinia Star
21. Justices of the Peace
22. District Council Chairmen and other members

== Hong Kong order of precedence before 1997 ==
Office holders on 1 June 1997 in brackets:

1. Governor (Chris Patten)
2. Chief Justice (Noel Power (Acting))
3. Chief Secretary (Anson Chan, CBE, JP)
4. Commander British Forces in Hong Kong, if of the rank of major general (Major-General Bryan Dutton, CBE)
5. Heads of Churches
  1. Bishop of Hong Kong (Bishop Peter Kwong)
  2. Roman Catholic Bishop of Hong Kong (Cardinal John Wu)
6. Financial Secretary (Donald Tsang, OBE, JP)
7. Attorney General (Jeremy Fell Mathews, CMG, JP)
8. President of the Legislative Council (Andrew Wong, OBE, JP)
9. Members of the Executive Council
10. Other members of the Legislative Council
11. Diplomatic Officers
  1. Commonwealth Commissioners and Consuls-General de Carriere
  2. Acting Commonwealth Commissioners and Acting Consuls-General de Carriere
  3. Honorary Consuls-General
  4. Senior British Trade Commissioner (Francis Cornish, CMG, LVO)
12. Heads of Universities
  1. President of the Hong Kong University of Science and Technology (Woo Chia-wei, CBE)
  2. President and Vice-Chancellor of the Hong Kong Baptist University (Daniel Tse, CBE, JP)
  3. President of the Hong Kong Polytechnic University (Poon Chung-kwong, OBE, JP)
  4. Vice-Chancellor of the University of Hong Kong (Yiu-Chung Cheng, CBE, JP)
  5. President of the City University of Hong Kong (Chang Hsin-kang)
  6. Vice-Chancellor of the Chinese University of Hong Kong (Arthur Li)
13. Judges of the Supreme Court
  1. Justices of Appeal
  2. Judges of the High Court
14. Knights
15. Heads of Public service units
  1. Commissioner of police (Eddie Hui, QPM, CPM)
  2. Chairman of the Public Service Commission (Haider Hatim Tyebjee Barma, CBE, ISO, JP)
  3. The Ombudsman (Andrew So, OBE, JP)
  4. Commissioner, Independent Commission Against Corruption (Lily Yam, JP)
  5. Chairman of the Urban Council (Ronald Leung, OBE, JP)
  6. Chairman of the Regional Council (Daniel Lam, JP)
16. Consuls de Carriere who are Heads of Post
17. Honorary Consuls who are Heads of Post
18. Other Secretaries and Heads of Group I Departments
19. Chief of Staff and Senior Naval Officer (Commodore Peter John Melson, CBE)
20. Hong Kong Commissioner in London (Sir David Robert Ford, KBE, LVO, JP)
21. Other Members of the Urban and Regional Councils
22. Administrative Officer Staff Grade "A" and Heads of Departments of similar status
23. District Judges
24. District Board Chairmen
25. Companions, Commanders, Officers and Members of Orders of Chivalry
26. Justices of the Peace

== Notes ==
a.Also the Vice Chairman of the National Committee of the Chinese People's Political Consultative Conference, and will be treated as a guest at SAR functions.
b.Also a member of the Legislative Council
c.Also a District Council Chairman.
d.Henry Hu appeared in an earlier precedence as a recipient of the Grand Bauhinia Medal.
e.The most recent holder of this position, Michael Yeung, died on 3 January 2019.

== See also ==
- Order of precedence in China
- Hong Kong honours system
