= Eddie Hui =

Hong Kong Police commissioner (1943–2009)

Eddie Hui Ki-on GBS CBE QPM CPM
- 許淇安

Commissioner of Police of the Hong Kong Police
- In office 1 July 1997 – 1 January 2001
- Succeeded by: Tsang Yam-pui

Commissioner of Police of the Royal Hong Kong Police
- In office 3 July 1994 – 30 June 1997
- Preceded by: Li Kwan-ha

Personal details
- Born: 10 October 1943 Japanese occupation of Hong Kong
- Died: 3 May 2009 (aged 65) Queen Mary Hospital, Pok Fu Lam, Hong Kong

Eddie Hui Ki-on (simplified Chinese: 许淇安; traditional Chinese: 許淇安; pinyin: Xǔ Qí'ān, 10 October 1943 - 3 May 2009) was the last Commissioner of the Royal Hong Kong Police from 1994 to 1997, and the first Commissioner of Hong Kong Police from 1 July 1997 to 1 January 2001. Li Kwan-ha ran the force before him. Hui was the second ethnic Chinese person to lead the force.

== Career ==
In February 1963, at 19 years old, Hui's police career began when he joined the Hong Kong Police Force as a probationary inspector. In 1966 he was confirmed in the rank of inspector. In July 1972 he was promoted superintendent, and chief superintendent in June 1982. He was appointed Commissioner in July 1994.

In 1997's preparation for Hong Kong's handover to China on 1 July 1997, Chinese officials retained Hui as the police commissioner to maintain peace in the ranks in Hong Kong after July 1997.

== Organizations ==
Eddie Hui was on the main board for many organizations. These included as the executive director for K Wah International Holdings Ltd and an independent non-executive director for RoadShow Holdings Ltd. He also used to be the Assistant Chief Commissioner (International & Liaison) of the Scout Association of Hong Kong and the Vice-Chairman of The Football Association of Hong Kong, China.

Similar to many in his father's family, Eddie Hui was a voting member of the prestigious Hong Kong Jockey Club.

== Awards ==
Hui received the honors of the Commander of the Order of the British Empire (CBE) in 1997 and the Gold Bauhinia Star in 2001. In addition, Hui was awarded the Colonial Police Medal in 1979 Birthday Honours and Queen's Police Medal in 1988 New Year Honours.

- United Kingdom :
  - Colonial Police Medal (CPM) (1979)
  - Colonial Police Long Service Medal (1981)
  - Colonial Police Long Service Medal First Clasps (1988)
  - Queen's Police Medal (QPM) (1988)
  - Colonial Police Long Service Medal Second Clasps (1993)
  - Commander of the Order of the British Empire (CBE) (1997)
- Hong Kong :
  - Hong Kong Police Long Service Medal
  - Gold Bauhinia Star (GBS) (2001)

== Personal life ==
Hui had a wife and two sons. In 2008, Hui was diagnosed with cancer. On 3 May 2009, Hui died from liver cancer in Queen Mary Hospital in Hong Kong at the age of 65.

Police appointments
Preceded by Li Kwan-ha	Commissioner of Police of Hong Kong; 1994–2001	Succeeded by Tsang Yam-pui
