= Freddy Boey =

Singaporean academic administrator

Professor Freddy Boey
- 梅彦昌

President of the City University of Hong Kong
- In office 18 May 2023 – 24 Apr 2026
- Preceded by: Way Kuo

Deputy President (Innovation & Enterprise) of the National University of Singapore
- In office January 2018 – December 2022

Personal details
- Education: National University of Singapore (Ph.D.)

Freddy Boey (Chinese: 梅彦昌) is a Singaporean academic who formerly served as the president of the City University of Hong Kong. Boey was previously the deputy president (innovation & enterprise) of the National University of Singapore (NUS), overseeing the university's initiatives and activities in the areas of innovation, entrepreneurship and research translation, as well as graduate studies. He was previously the senior vice president (graduate education and research translation) of NUS. Before joining NUS in 2018, Boey was deputy president and provost of Nanyang Technological University (NTU) from July 2011 to September 2017. Prior to these appointments, he was the chair of NTU's School of Materials Science and Engineering from 2005 to 2010.

== Education ==
A professor of materials engineering, Boey graduated from Monash University, Australia, with a First Class Honours degree in materials engineering in 1980. He obtained his PhD in Chemistry and Engineering in 1987 from the National University of Singapore.

== Research and innovation ==
Boey's research areas are in functional biomaterials for medical devices, nanomaterials and nanostructures for cell regeneration, sensing and energy storage. A keen inventor, he has filed 25 original patents with NTU, the majority of which have been licensed. He founded several companies to patent and license his creations, such as a surgical tissue retractor which was licensed to Insightra Medical Inc., Irvine, California, and sold in the United States, India, Japan and Europe.

Boey's other inventions include a fully biodegradable peripheral cardiovascular stent, micropumps for thermal management solutions in consumer electronic gadgets, microfluidic and biomedical devices a coronary stent with drug release capability, a hernia mesh and cardiac peptides for treating heart diseases. His innovations have garnered him numerous investment funding and research grants.

Among the companies Boey founded are Amaranth Medical Inc, Adcomp Technology Pte Ltd and Electroactiv Ltd. Boey also teamed up with the renowned Mayo Clinic to develop implants for the controlled release of cardiac peptides specially designed to treat heart diseases, through a joint start-up, CardioRev Pte Ltd. This company won early-stage funding under SPRING Singapore’s Technology Enterprise Commercialisation Scheme.

Boey has published 344 top journal papers with a citation of 7436 and h-index of 44. He won about S$36 million in competitive research grants between 2008 and 2011, including a S$10 million individual National Research Foundation (NRF) Competitive Research Programme grant for his work on fully biodegradable cardiovascular implants, a S$20 million NRF Technion-Singapore grant for his research in nanomedicine for cardiovascular diseases and a S$1.25 million grant from the NRF Translational Flagship Project for his research to make cataract surgery safer.

== Teaching ==
During his tenure as chair of NTU's School of Materials Science and Engineering, Boey oversaw its transformation into one of the leading schools in the field. As an educator and mentor, Boey has supervised 33 PhD students and mentored 15 post-doctoral students. His current biomedical research team comprises 12 PhD students and more than 10 post-doctoral students and senior research fellows. About 15 of his past and current students and staff have been or are now involved in their own or his start-up companies.

As deputy president and provost, Boey has worked to enhance learning conditions for students. Among these initiatives are a S$45 million learning hub with modern study and social facilities, as well as upgraded learning spaces and resources across campus. He has also implemented new measures to ensure that teaching standards remain high, with potential faculty appointments having their teaching abilities reviewed on different levels.

== Awards and appointments ==
Boey won the President's Science and Technology Medal in 2013, the highest scientific award in Singapore. He received the gold medal from the President Tony Tan Keng Yam during September 2013.

He was awarded Singapore's Public Administration Medal (Gold) by the Government of Singapore in 2016. He was also awarded Singapore's Public Administration Medal (Silver) by the Government of Singapore in 2010. He is a director on the boards of the Intellectual Property Office of Singapore, DSO National Laboratories and Temasek Laboratories@NTU, and is a founding member of the newly set up Singapore Academy of Engineers.

He is also a member of the SPRING Singapore Technology Policy Advisory Committee and has been on the President's Science and President's Technology Award committee since 2007.

Boey is on the panel of several national funding and award panels and has chaired the National A*STAR Grants Review Committee for the past few years. He is also Honorary Professor at both the University of Indonesia and the Nanjing University of Posts and Telecommunications.

An active member of the materials engineering community, Boey is a Fellow of the Institute of Materials, Minerals and Mining (United Kingdom) and Fellow of the Institute of Engineers Singapore, and was until recently the Deputy President of the Materials Research Society, Singapore.

Boey was an ad hoc member of NTU's inaugural University Academic Advisory Committee. He was also an appointed member of both the University Blue Ribbon Commission and the Blue Ribbon Implementation Commission.

In November 2011, Boey received the Distinguished Alumni of the Year Award from Monash University at the 50th anniversary celebrations of its Faculty of Engineering. The award recognises his achievements as a teacher, researcher and innovator, including his exceptional contributions to nanomedicine, as well as his active community engagement.

In December 2011, he received the Degree of Doctor of Technology from Loughborough University for his outstanding achievements as an engineer and academic leader.

In February 2013, he was awarded the prestigious Faculty of Medicine Fellowship by Imperial College London in recognition of his achievements in the field of biomedical engineering and his outstanding contributions to the development of the Lee Kong Chian School of Medicine.

Boey was appointed the President of City University of Hong Kong on 18 May 2023, and he formally resigned from the post on 24 Apr 2026.

Academic offices
Preceded by Way Kuo	President of the City University of Hong Kong; 18 May 2023 – present	Incumbent
