= Medal for Bravery (Silver) =

Hong Kong medal for bravery

Medal for Bravery (Silver) 銀英勇勳章
- Image of the medal
- Awarded for: gallantry of an extremely high order
- Presented by: Hong Kong
- Post-nominals: MBS
- Established: 1997
- First award: 1999

Precedence
- Next (higher): Silver Bauhinia Star
- Next (lower): Distinguished Service Medals

Medal for Bravery
- Traditional Chinese: 銀英勇勳章
- Simplified Chinese: 银英勋勳章
Transcriptions
Standard Mandarin
- Hanyu Pinyin: Yín Yīngyǒng Xūnzhāng
- Wade–Giles: Yin Yingyung Hsünchang
Yue: Cantonese
- Yale Romanization: Yin^{2} Ying^{1}yung^{3} Syun^{1}jang^{1}
- Jyutping: Ngan Jingjung Fanzoeng

The Silver Medal for Bravery (Chinese: 銀英勇勳章, MBS) is the second Medal for Bravery rank in the honours system of Hong Kong.

The medal is awarded for "gallantry of an extremely high order." The Silver Medal for Bravery was created in 1997 to replace the British honours system after the transfer of sovereignty to the People's Republic of China and the establishment of the Hong Kong Special Administrative Region (HKSAR).

== List of recipients ==
=== 1999 ===
- Mr David Neil Bennet, MBS
- Mr Cheung Chi-ming, MBS
- Mr Chan Chiu-ming, MBS
- Mr Lau Wai-yan, MBS
- Mr Tam Siu-hung, MBS

=== 2000 ===
- Mr Lee Chi-wah, MBS
- Mr Choi To, MBS

=== 2001 ===
- Mr Cheung Yat-ming, MBS
- Mr To Chi-ming, MBS
- Mr Pang Yuk-wa, MBS
- Mr Choi Yu-shing, MBS
- Mr Cheng Kam-wah, MBS

=== 2002 ===
- Mr Leung Shing-yan, MBS (posthumous)

=== 2003 ===
- Ms Wong Kang-tai, MBS (posthumous)
- Mr Lau Wing-kai, MBS (posthumous)
- Ms Lau Kam-yung, MBS (posthumous)
- Dr Cheng Ha-yan, Kate, MBS (posthumous)
- Ms Tang Heung-may, MBS (posthumous)
- Mr Leung Bo-ming, MBS (posthumous)
- Mr Hui Chi-leung, MBS
- Mr Ng Ka-man, MBS

=== 2004 ===
- Mr Yip Chi-hang, Czeven, MBS

=== 2005 ===
- Mr Wong Hon, MBS
- Mr Tam Po-ming, MBS

=== 2007 ===
- Captain Chan Chi-pui, Michael, MBS, GMSM
- Captain Wu Wai-hung, MBS
- Mr Chan Siu-kei, MBS
- Mr Chak Hoi-leung, MBS
- Mr Li Yuk-wah, MBS
- Mr Lee Kwok-ming, Thomas, MBS

=== 2014 ===
- Mr. CHAK Hoi-leung, MBS
- Mr. YUEN Ka-wai, MBS

=== 2016 ===
- Mr. WAN Kin-wai, MBS

=== 2018 ===
- Mr. LEE Pak-keung, MBS
- Mr. WONG Sui-ki, MBS
- Mr. SO Chi-wing, Ran, MBS
- Mr. SO Ka-cheung, MBS

=== 2019 ===
- Mr. HUI Chun-wai, MBS
- Mr. YEUNG Chee-choi, MBS
- Mr. CHUNG Ho-man, MBS

=== 2020 ===
- Mr. CHU Ki-fung, MBS
- Mr. LING Ka-wai, MBS
- Mr. LEUNG Yat-fai, MBS
- Mr. LEUNG Siu-cheung, Wesley, MBS
- Mr. LEUNG Chun-yin, MBS
- Mr. LAU Tat-ming, MBS
- Mr. TANG Kwong-kwan, MBS

=== 2021 ===
- Ms. SUEN Wai-mei, MBS
- Mr. LUI Chun-kit, MBS
- Mr. LAI Nestor Ngo-yau, MBS
- Mr. Adam Alexander ROBERTS, MBS

=== 2022 ===
- Mr. SO King-cho, MBS

=== 2023 ===
- Mr. SZETO Chi-pang, MBS
- Mr. LUI Ka-ching, MBS

=== 2024 ===
- Mr Vinson So Yuet-leung MBS (posthumous)
