= Orders, decorations, and medals of Hong Kong =

The existing Hong Kong honours system was created after the transfer of government of Hong Kong to the People's Republic of China as a special administrative region in 1997. Before that, Hong Kong was a British dependent territory and followed the British honours system.

The Hong Kong SAR government releases an annual Honours List, which is published in the Government Gazette on Establishment Day (1 July).

== Types of awards ==
=== General Medals ===
==== The Grand Bauhinia Medal ====
The Grand Bauhinia Medal, the highest award under the HKSAR honours and awards system, is to recognise the selected person's lifelong and highly significant contribution to the well-being of Hong Kong. The awardee is entitled to the postnominal letters GBM and the style The Honourable. (Bauhinia, Bauhinia blakeana, is the floral emblem of Hong Kong.)

==== The Bauhinia Star ====
The Order of the Bauhinia Star has three classes: Gold, Silver and Bronze.

The Gold Bauhinia Star (GBS) is awarded to eminent persons who have given very distinguished services to the community or who have rendered public or voluntary services of a very high degree of merit.

The Silver Bauhinia Star (SBS) is awarded to persons who have taken a leading part in public affairs and/or voluntary work over a long period of time.

The Bronze Bauhinia Star (BBS) is awarded to persons who have given outstanding service over a long period of time, but in a more limited field or way than that required for the Silver Bauhinia Star.

==== The Medal of Honour ====
The Medal of Honour (MH) is the basic award under the honours system and is awarded in recognition of community service in a district or in a particular field over a long period of time. It is also awarded to non-directorate civil servants who have served with distinction.

=== Gallantry Medals ===
==== The Medal for Bravery ====
The Medal for Bravery is awarded for display of bravery in an incident. It too has three classes, Gold, Silver and Bronze.

The Medal for Bravery (Gold) is awarded for acts of gallantry of the greatest possible heroism or of the most conspicuous courage in circumstances of extreme danger.

The Medal for Bravery (Silver) is awarded for gallantry of an extremely high order.

The Medal for Bravery (Bronze) is awarded for exemplary acts of gallantry of a lesser standard.

=== Disciplined Services and ICAC Medals ===
The Disciplined Services and ICAC Awards are awarded to officers of the six major disciplined formations as well as the Independent Commission Against Corruption. The disciplined formations are the Hong Kong Police, Hong Kong Fire Services, Hong Kong Immigration Service, Hong Kong Customs and Excise, Hong Kong Correctional Services, and the Government Flying Service. These awards replace the colonial awards issued before July 1997 that had profile of the reigning monarch and different ribbons. There are three types of awards:

==== Distinguished service medals ====
- Hong Kong Police Medal for Distinguished Service (PDSM)
- Hong Kong Fire Services Medal for Distinguished Service (FSDSM)
- Hong Kong Immigration Service Medal for Distinguished Service (IDSM)
- Hong Kong Customs and Excise Medal for Distinguished Service (CDSM)
- Hong Kong Correctional Services Medal for Distinguished Service (CSDSM)
- Government Flying Service Medal for Distinguished Service (GDSM)
- Hong Kong ICAC Medal for Distinguished Service (IDS)

==== Meritorious service medals ====
- Hong Kong Police Medal for Meritorious Service (PMSM)
- Hong Kong Fire Services Medal for Meritorious Service (FSMSM)
- Hong Kong Immigration Service Medal for Meritorious Service (IMSM)
- Hong Kong Customs and Excise Medal for Meritorious Service (CMSM)
- Hong Kong Correctional Services Medal for Meritorious Service (CSMSM)
- Government Flying Service Medal for Meritorious Service (GMSM)
- Hong Kong ICAC Medal for Meritorious Service (IMS)

==== Long service medals and clasps ====
- Hong Kong Police long service medals and clasps
- Hong Kong Auxiliary Police long service medals and clasps
- Hong Kong Fire Services long service medals and clasps
- Hong Kong Correctional Services long service medals and clasps
- Hong Kong Immigration Service long service medals and clasps
- Hong Kong Customs and Excise long service medals and clasps
- Government Flying Service Long Service Medal
- Hong Kong Independent Commission Against Corruption Long Service Medal
- Hong Kong Auxiliary Medical Services long service medals and clasps
- Civil Aid Service long service medals and clasps

=== Other Medals ===
Other medals have been created and awarded to mainly disciplined forces personnel including:

- 境外救援行動章 (Direct translation: Overseas Rescue Operation Medal) (A star is attached for each mission)
- Operation TIDERIDER Medal (Orange Stripe for "Courage", and Purple Stripe for "Wisdom").
- Medal for Safeguarding National Security

=== General awards ===
These awards consists of a framed certificate with the Emblem of Hong Kong, name of the award in English and Chinese, name of the recipient (Chinese or English) commending their extraordinary contribution to the community, government or public service:

- Chief Executive's Commendation for Community Service
- Chief Executive's Commendation for Government and Public Service

== Order of precedence ==
The order of precedence is listed as follows in postnominals: GBM, GBS, MBG, SBS, MBS, BBS, MBB, MH, JP.

== Nomination and awarding ==
The nomination is usually made by SAR Government departments, and evaluated by the Honours Committee. The annual Honours List is published in the Gazette of the SAR Government on the Hong Kong Special Administrative Region Establishment Day (1 July)

== Orders, decorations and medals of British Hong Kong ==
List of awards available to people in Hong Kong prior to 30 June 1997:

- See Modern Honours from the United Kingdom
- See Chivalry orders from the United Kingdom
- Hong Kong Disciplined Services Medal – for long service and good conduct in the disciplined services between 1986 and 1997.

=== Recipients of colonial Hong Kong gallantry awards ===
https://www.gov.uk/guidance/medals-campaigns-descriptions-and-eligibility#decorations-gallantry-and-distinguished-conduct-medals

Orders, Decorations and Medals conferred on Hong Kong residents or in respect of Hong Kong service up to 30 June 1997:
Victoria Cross (VC)
John Robert Osborn (1941)

George Cross (GC)
Mateen Ahmed Ansari (1946)
Douglas Ford (1946)
John Alexander Fraser MC & Bar (1946)
Hector Bertram Gray AFM (1946)
Lanceray Arthur Newnham (1946)
Joseph Hughes (1946)

Distinguished Service Order (DSO)
Henry William Moncrieff Stewart OBE, MC (1946)
Wells Arnold Bishop (1946)
Ernest Hodkinson (1946)
Cecil Robert Templer (1946)
Evan George Stewart (1946)
Arthur John Dewar (1946)

Order of the British Empire (CBE) for Gallantry
Alfred Creighton Collinson (1946)
Andrew Peffers OBE (1946)

Order of the British Empire (OBE) for Gallantry
Osmonde Hedworth Farrar (1930)
Lindsay Tasman Ride (1942)
Keble Theodore Andrews-Levinge (1946)
Eustace Levett (1946)
John Herbert Price MC (1946)

Order of the British Empire (MBE) for Gallantry
Sher Singh (1945)
Victor Stanley Ebbage BEM (1945)
Hargraves Milne Howell (1945)
William Nichols (1945)
Harry Charles Spong(1945)
David Louis Strellett (1945)
Charles Gentry Turner (1945)
Feroze Khan (1945)
Sister Elizabeth Mosey (1946)
Stanley Gordon Woods (1968)
Frederick John Preston (1973)

Indian Order of Merit (IOM)
Ali Mohd (1946)
Phul Singh (1946)
Nawaz Khan (1946)
Lakhu Singh (1946)

Distinguished Service Cross (DSC)
William Morley Wright (1942)
John Christian Bolder DSC & Bar (1942)
Arthur Luard Pears (1942)
Bruce Graham Clarke (1946)

Royal Red Cross – Member (RRC)
Sister Mary Ann Lockerbie Currie (née Davies; 1946)
Sister Margaret Anna North (1946)

Military Cross (MC)
E.W.M.L. Corbally (1942)
R.H.D. Scriven (1942)
Ivan Bernard Trevor (1942)
David Ronald Holmes (1943)
K.A. Munro (1943)
P. Steyn (1944)
R.A.S. Lane (1944)
J.S. McKay (1945)
James Allan Ford (1945)
Abdul Jabaar (1945)
Khan Sherrin (1945)
Martin Pryce Weedon (1945)
John Stanley Marcus Vintner (1945)
Robert Leslie Berridge (1945)
Caesar Edward Orway (1945)
David Pinkerton (1945)
Christopher Mark Maurice Man (1945)
Frederick Temple Atkinson (1945)
Uriah Laite (1945)
Robert William Philip (1945)
Thomas Alexander Blackwood (1945)
Collison Alexander Blaver (1945)
William Francis Nugent (1945)
Francis Gavan Power (1945)
Michael George Carruthers (1945)
B.C. Field (1945)
Ivor Phillip Tamworth (1945)
E.B. Teesdale (1945)
Mehr Khan (1945)
Shah Mohamed (1945)
Kampta Phasad (1945)
Haider Rehman Khan (1945)
David Clive Crosby Trench (Solomon Islands; 1946)
G.D.M. Williams (1965)

Air Force Cross (AFC)
Danny Cheung Kwong (1965)
Richard Paul Seymour (1973)
Peter Stephen Boyland (1992)
Christopher Jeremy Spencer Fynes (1993)
Steven Derek Murkin (1993)

Royal Red Cross – Associate (ARRC)
Sister Edith Butlin (1946)
Sister Gwendoline Colthorpe (1946)
Sister Edith Freda Davies (1946)
Sister Kathleen Georgina Christie (1946)
Sister Anna May Waters (1946)

Distinguished Conduct Medal (DCM)
Kishen Singh (1917)
Rur Singh (1917)
M.J. Muldowney (1920)
Colin Alden Standish (1920)
Derek Everard Rix (1920)
Arthur David Manning (1920)
Albert Edward Miller (1920)
Thomas F. Stainton (1920)
Charles Albert Clark (1920)
Ronald John Routledge (1946)

George Medal (GM)
N.G.A. Noble (1947)
Ian P. Hyde (Malaya; 1947)
Cheung On (1947)
Chau Fook (1952)
James Hidden (1952)
Leung Yiu-tong (1953)
P. Muskett (1958)
William James Gorman (1960)
Edward Louis Hanlon (1964)
James Hall Matchett (1968)
Choi Chor (1973)
James Hogg Bruce (1973)
John Caruth Gorman (1973)
Leung Shiu-kay (1973)
Chiu Yiu-nam (1983)
Ng Hung-shek (1994)

King's Police Medal for Gallantry (KPM)
Timothy Murphy (1923)
Kenneth Andrew (1928)
Roland Henry John Brooks (1947)
David Loie Fook-wing (1947)
Duncan George MacPherson (1947)
Harold Tiplady (1949)
Wong Wai Tsoi (1949)
Li Fu (1949)
Chiu Ho-ching (1949)

Queen's Police Medal for Gallantry (QPM)
Cheng Kin Cheung (1955)

Indian Distinguished Service Medal (IDSM)
Amanat Ali (1946)

Distinguished Service Medal (DSM)
Bernard Charlie Lilley (1946)
Albert John White (1946)

Military Medal (MM)
Ghulam Mohamad (1917), Nihal Singh (1917), Lab Singh (1918), Ghulam Hussain (1918), Tika Khan (1918), A. Hutchins (1919), Patrick John Sheridan (1942), Francis Lee Yiu-piu (1942), D.I. Bosanquet (1943), W.G. Poy (1944), A.A. Iles (1944), E.G. Jones (1944), Walter Ivan Cook (1946), Charles Douglas Goddard (1946), Arthur Philip Hoxby (1946), Puran Singh (1946), Resham Khan (1946), Tularam Singh (1946), Gordon Edward Williamson (1946), Stanley Walter Wright (1946), Emile Gregory Bernard (1946), Seldon Grant Stoddard (1946), Cecil Thomas Whalen (1946), Murray Thomas Goodenough (1946), Lionel Curtis Speller (1946), Kenneth Stanley Cameron (1946), Ronald Edward Atkinson (1946), Meirion Price (1946), John Leslie Varley (1946), Ernest Irwin Bennett (1946), William Henry Morris (1946), Ban Tsan-chuen (1946), H.V. Pearse (1946), C.L. Salter (1946), C.D. Walker (1946), Victor White (1946), David William Yee (1946), Mohd Amir (1946), Alfred Thomas Goschen Lloyd (1946), Chau Sik-wah (1952), Li Hon To (1960), Lui Tong (1960).
(NOTE: Further work required for 1946; see http://www.london-gazette.co.uk/issues/37521/supplements/1672)

Air Force Medal (AFM)
Keith George Thomas Sturge (1992)

Sea Gallantry Medal (SGM) (records incomplete here)
JOHN CROPPER, Chief Officer, GEORGE REGINALD JENKINS, Third Officer, BOND HUGGINS, Apprentice, WON JAH, HONG KAM, LAM POW, and LEONG YOE, Seamen, of the SS Bowes Castle; THOMAS LLOYD WILLIAMS, Chief Officer, KENNETH HENRY STUART, Second Officer, HAROLD WAINRIGHT, GEORGE ARTHUR PARKER, STANLEY LEONARD GARRETT, JOHN EDWARD SNAITH, Apprentices, GE LING LOW, Quartermaster, SING YUNG SANG, Boatswain, CHING CHIN FONG, LIN AH YOK, LEE VAN CHAN, CHANG CHIN PAN, CHANG PAN FAH and YING AH PAN, Seamen of the SS Egremont Castle; A. LEXOW, Chief Officer, ROLF FREDERIK MOLTZAU, Second Officer, G. DAKSERHOFF, Third Officer, CHEE AH KUN, Boatswain's Mate, HAN FAT SANG, TSE TOR, and LIN CHANG CHIN, Quartermasters, fireman, and cabin boy who formed part of the boat's crew from the SS Hwah Ping (all 1923); SO HAU, Fireman of SS Paul Beau of Hong Kong (1925)

Colonial Police Medal for Gallantry (CPM)
Frederick Edward Evelyn Booker, Jack Cooper Fitz-Henry, Chan Ng, William Stirton McHardy, Christopher Stanley Pile, Tam Chung, Tang Ka, Gordon Charles Taylor, Frederick Douglas Bishop Tuckett (1939), George Allan Rodney Wright-Nooth (1946), Roland Henry John Brooks (1947), Charles William Brown (1947), Chan Sang (1947), Ho Yuk (1947), Lok So (1947), William Todd (1947), Yan Fuk (1947), Chan Wing (1948), Chiu Ho-ching (1948), Li Fu (1948), Li Hon-to (1960), Lui Tong (1960), Wong Kai-wan (1962), Cheung Tin (1964), William Roger Deane (1964), John Henry Douglas Bell (1964), Brian Gray Fender (1964), Cheng Yee Hung (1966), Cheung Kwai Chau (1966), Law Kim-chuen (1966), Wu Yun-tsung (1966), Chiu Sau-sum (1968), Trevor John Colley (1968), Kwok Chung (1968), David Pitt (1968), Edward Joseph Stevenson (1968), Tang Wong-yau (1968), Tsang Wing CPM & Bar (1968), Cheung Tin-fat (1972), Roberton James Patterson Burton (1972), Kong Yuk-sut (1972), Leung Kam-ming (1972), Choy Fut-po (1973), Chiu Yiu-chip (1973), Anthony Stuart Conway (1973), Leslie Burton (1973), Peter Michael Mullens (1973), Lun Kam-yat (1973), Luk Kai-lau (1973), Ng Kam-hung (1973), David Wilfred Frederick O'Brien (1973), John Reid (1973), Yau Shou-kit (1973), Chan Kam-ming (1974), Lau Piu (1974)

Queen's Gallantry Medal (QGM)
Yip Long-ping (1977), Ho Hing-chuen (1979), Aimansing Limbu (1979), Chan Kwai-fai (1980), Tung Chi-kan (1980), Yeung Chun-hing (1980), Nicholas Alexander McQueen (1981), Lo Wai-shing (1982), Cheung Wai-leung (1982), Chiu Shing-chau (1982), Leung Siu-lin (1984), Timothy Martin Adamson (1984), Martin John Lovatt (1986), Chiu Ka-ping (1987), Li Tam-shing (1989), Lui Tak-wah (1989), Chan Chi-choi (1989), Cheng Kwok-wai (1991), Anthony Martin Leahy (1991), Nicholas John Roberts (1991), Tsang Hung-lit (1991), Yeung Kwok-wing (1993), Nigel Mills (1993), Griffiths (1993), Chan Lun-fat (1993), Cheung Hin-yeung (1993), Yeung Chi-fai (1995), Cheung Kwok Keung (1995), Lee Man-ying (1995), WPC Leung Lai-fun (1995), Barry John Smith (1995), Andrew Mark Steeple (1996), Jason Chan Siu-kei (1997), Ma Hing-keung (1997), Ma Ka-kuen (1997)

British Empire Medal for Gallantry (BEM)
Jalal Din (1946)
Mohammed Afsar (1946)
Richard Malig (1947)
Emundo Da Silva (1947)
David John Leonard (1947) Gordon Cleaver 1953,
Peter Anderson (1955)
Yu Kwong (1960)
Tang Sai-bun (1962)
Bhimraj Rai (1962)
Lee Nai Liang (1965)
David Lawrence Birch (1965)
Anthony Charlwood (1968)
Jack Cavie (1968)
Anthony Roger Prouse (1973)

Mentions in Dispatches (MID)
Charles Cranes, Albert Archibald Bennett, William Hook, William Barker Bradley, John Edward Dunderdale, James Forsyth Ross, Arthur Beresford Scott, Maurice D'Avignon, George Stuart MacDonnell, Kenneth Edward Porter, Charles John Sharp, Leslie Robert Stickles, James Murray Thom, Charles Watson, John Joseph Fitzpatrick, Edwin Harrison, Lorne Rayburn Latimer, Ernest Charles McFarland, George William McRae, Sydney Albert Sheffer, Edwin George Smith, Frank Brown, Bernard Castonguay, Robert Damant, Morgan Isaac Davies, Aubery Peacock Flegg, Nelson Carlisle Galbraith, Norman Charles Matthews, Lloyd Logan Roblee, James Austen Wallace, Ellis Taylor Edge, Sister E.A. Hills (all 1946)
NOTE: Further work required for 1946 Posthumous MID/MID (see http://www.london-gazette.co.uk/issues/37636/start=1, http://www.london-gazette.co.uk/issues/37521/supplements/1672, http://www.london-gazette.co.uk/issues/37704/supplements/4342)

King's/Queen's Commendation for Brave Conduct (KCBC/QCBC)
Charlie Leung Chung-yee MBE (1947)

Donald William Cuthbert, Robert Esson (1954),

Lo Chow, James Steele (1955),

Arthur Checksfield, Ronald Harry George McKinlay (1960),

Wong Kam-wah (1962),

Lau Cheung (1963),

Choi Yuk-shu, Ng Wing-hang (1964),

John Samuel Barker, Peter Christopher Bickmore, Francis Michael Digby Hoyal, Douglas Ralph Humphrey, Mark Gregory Richie, Dunraj Rai, Lakhdham Rai (1968),

Terence Arthur Berrecloth, Chan Shing-tak, Chan Shing-yuk, Cheung Shu-sing, Trevor George Collins, Hung Sui-to, Paul Kennedy, Kong Kin, Leung Shing-chau, Li Chuen, Liu Chiu-kwan, Lo Shiu-kuen, John Dominic Moran, Pun Wai-cheung, Tam Wai-hung, Tsui Hin-kwing, Wong Shiu-hung, Guy Sanderson Shirra (1973),

Yip Kai (1976),

Lam Sai-kit, Lo Wing-tai, Lo Yin-hok, Miu Wa-keung (1977),

Cheung Ching, Chu Yung-san, Jiwanprassad Gurung, Li Wai-leung, Ng Choi-leung (1978),

Chau Kwong-tak, Ng Chung-hung, Dalbahadur Rai, Tang Kwok-fung, To Kwok-chiu (1979),

Leung Kam-chu, Tsui Pui-ling (1980),

Chan Shiu-fai (1981),

Mohamad Aslam, Wong Chun-fai (1982),

Chan Chung-hing, Ko Wing-wah, Robert Ying Ka-wong (1983),

Chiu Kwok-yin, Li Kei-kit, Ma Shui-lun, Yan Ping-kuen (1984),

Fu Siu-wing, Li Hoi-chin, Ng Kwan-wai (1986),

Wong Kwai-leung (1989),

Kam Man-wei, Wong Chi-hung (1990),

Andrew Richard Harrison, Lam Kong, Christopher James O'Donnell, John Jamieson Oberg Stoddart, Tam Ting-kai, Tang Yau-keung (1992),

Chau Ka-keung (1994)

Queen's Commendation for Bravery (QCB)
Brian James Morris, Stephen John Rule, Wut Chi-wai (1995)
Cham Wui-wai, Chan Chi-man, Hon Wing-sang (1996)
Wu Wai-cham, Chow Hau-leung (1997)

Queen's Commendation for Bravery in the Air (QCBA)
Raymond Chang Yao-teng (1996)
Ronald So Chi-yip (1997)

Kings/Queen's Commendation for Valuable Service in the Air (K/QCVSA)
The K/QCVSA was originally a British military award for gallantry equivalent to an MID (see above). It was later broadened to include meritorious acts and service by both military and civilian air crew. The award was replaced by the QCVS (non-gallantry) and the QCBA (see above) in 1994.

Gerald Walter Cussans 1947,
Danny Cheung Kong AFC (1962)
Argo Chow Chong Yan, Thomas Douglas Lewis, Ronald Percy Smith (1965)
Paul Henry Rosentall, Peter Dicky Yip (1983)
Edward Ho Dick Sang, Ross Law Siu-hing, Frank James Pilkington, Elton Tang Sing Chung, David Arthur Walmsley, Richard Paul Cooke, Michael William Pedrick (1992)
Grant Robertson, Raymong Chang Yao Teng, Jimmy Choi Chiu Ming, Michael Ellis, Mason Ng Wai Cheong (1993)
German Tsoi Tak-man (1994)

== Justice of the peace ==
Justice of the Peace (太平紳士; JP) is a title of honour given by the Government to community leaders, and to certain officials while they are in their terms of offices. Official Justices of the Peace (官守太平紳士) is usually refer to those who is both a government official and a Justice of the Peace. The others may be referred as Non-Official Justice of the Peace (非官守太平紳士). For a person who is related to the New Territories, the Chief Secretary for Administration may appoint him/her as a New Territories Justice of the Peace (新界太平紳士).

Justices of the Peace have no judicial functions, and their main duties include visiting prisons, administering statutory declarations, to serve any advisory panels, and other functions appointed by the Chief Executive.

== See also ==
- List of people with Hong Kong SAR honours since 1997
- Orders, decorations, and medals of the United Kingdom: formerly granted in Hong Kong and ceased after 1997. Honour members can continue to carry the titles, but not officially recognised in Hong Kong by the government after 1997.
- Hong Kong order of precedence
- Orders, decorations, and medals of Macau
