= Overseas Territories Police Medal =

Overseas Territories Police Medal Formerly Colonial Police Medal
- Ribbon bar of the CPM for Gallantry Ribbon bar of medal for Meritorious Service
- Type: Medal
- Awarded for: gallantry or distinguished service
- Country: British Overseas Territories
- Presented by: the King of the United Kingdom
- Eligibility: police officers in British Overseas Territories, Crown Colonies, and British Dependent Territories
- Post-nominals: CPM (until 2012); OTPM (from 2012)
- Status: CPM for Meritorious Service currently awarded CPM for Gallantry replaced by King's Gallantry Medal
- First award: 8 November 1938

Order of Wear
- Next (higher): Sierra Leone Fire Brigades Medal
- Equivalent: Colonial Police Medal

The Overseas Territories Police Medal (OTPM), or Overseas Territories Police and Fire Service Medal, known as the Colonial Police Medal (CPM) until April 2012, is a medal awarded for gallantry or distinguished service to all ranks of police forces and organised fire brigades in British Overseas Territories, and formerly in Crown Colonies and British Dependent Territories. Police officers in these areas can also be awarded the higher ranking King's Police Medal. The CPM was first awarded in 1938.

The most common form of the CPM was the Colonial Police Medal for Meritorious Service. The equivalent for gallantry, the Colonial Police Medal for Gallantry, which could be awarded posthumously, had not been awarded since 1974 and was effectively replaced by the King's Gallantry Medal, which has been awarded posthumously since 1977. Queen Elizabeth II made the last presentations to two recipients in 1975 while she was in Hong Kong.

Ribbon clasps could be bestowed to the gallantry medal for further acts, marked with a silver rosette on the ribbon when worn alone.

From 1938 to 1979, 482 medals for gallantry were awarded, including 17 to fire brigade members, in addition to nine second award clasps. In the same period 3,305 medals for meritorious service were awarded, including 169 to fire brigade members.

Awards are announced in The Gazette.

When worn with other decorations, the medal for gallantry is worn immediately before the King’s Gallantry Medal, the medal for meritorious service immediately before jubilee and coronation awards.

== Description ==
It is a circular silver medal, 36 mm in diameter, with the ribbon suspended from a ring. It has the following design:

- The obverse bears the profile of the reigning monarch with an appropriate inscription.
- There are different reverse designs for police and fire brigade recipients:
  Police: a vertical truncheon in front of a laurel wreath, surrounded by the words 'OVERSEAS TERRITORIES POLICE FORCES FOR GALLANTRY', or 'FOR MERITORIOUS SERVICE'. Until 2012 the wording referred to 'COLONIAL POLICE FORCES'.
  Fire brigade: a firefighter's helmet and axe superimposed on a laurel wreath. Inscribed around the edge are the words 'OVERSEAS TERRITORIES FIRE BRIGADES FOR GALLANTRY', or 'FOR MERITORIOUS SERVICE'. Until 2012 the wording referred to 'COLONIAL FIRE BRIGADES'.
- The medals are issued with the details of the recipient inscribed on the rim.
