= Hong Kong Police Force =

Principal law enforcement agency of Hong Kong

- Coloured Version of the Emblem of Hong Kong Police Force normally used on items such as flags, name tags, official documents and for vehicle display. Another Silver Metallic Version of the Emblem is often used on cap badges, buildings, social media accounts and official website.
- Abbreviation: HKPF
- Motto: Serving Hong Kong with Honour, Duty and Loyalty

Agency overview
- Formed: 1 May 1844; 182 years ago
- Annual budget: HK$20.6 billion (2019–20)
- Legal personality: Police force

Jurisdictional structure
- Operations jurisdiction: Hong Kong, China
- General nature: Local civilian police

Operational structure
- Headquarters: Police Headquarters, 1 Arsenal Street, Wan Chai, Hong Kong Island, Hong Kong
- Police officers: Disciplined officers: 33,210 (2023); Auxiliary officers: 4,501 (2021)
- Civilian officers: 4,735 (2023)
- Agency executive: Joe Chow, Commissioner of Police
- Parent agency: Security Bureau
- Units: Operations and Support; Crime and Security; Personnel and Training; Management Services; Finance, Administration & Planning; National Security; Information Systems Wing

Website
- www.police.gov.hk

Chinese name
- Traditional Chinese: 香港警務處
- Simplified Chinese: 香港警务处
Transcriptions
Standard Mandarin
- Hanyu Pinyin: Xiānggǎng Jǐngwùchù
Yue: Cantonese
- Yale Romanization: Hēunggóng Gíngmouh Chyu
- Jyutping: Hoeng1gong2 Ging2mou6 Cyu3
- IPA: [hœŋ˥.kɔŋ˧˥ kɪŋ˧˥.mɔw˨ tsʰy˧]

Hong Kong Police
- Chinese: 香港警察
Transcriptions
Standard Mandarin
- Hanyu Pinyin: Xiānggǎng Jǐngchá
Yue: Cantonese
- Yale Romanization: Hēunggóng Gíngchaat
- Jyutping: Hoeng1gong2 Ging2caat3
- IPA: [hœŋ˥.kɔŋ˧˥ kɪŋ˧˥.tsʰat̚˧]

Royal Hong Kong Police Force
- Traditional Chinese: 皇家香港警務處
- Simplified Chinese: 皇家香港警务处
Transcriptions
Standard Mandarin
- Hanyu Pinyin: Huángjiā Xiānggǎng Jǐngwùchù
Yue: Cantonese
- Jyutping: wong4 gaa1 Hoeng1gong2 Ging2mou6 Cyu3

The Hong Kong Police Force (HKPF) is the primary law enforcement, investigative agency, and largest disciplined service under the Security Bureau of Hong Kong.

Pursuant to the one country, two systems principle, the HKPF is officially independent of the jurisdiction of the Ministry of Public Security of the People's Republic of China, which under usual circumstances may not interfere with Hong Kong’s local law enforcement matters. All HKPF officers are employed as civil servants and therefore required to pledge allegiance to the Hong Kong Basic Law.

The HKPF consists of approximately 34,000 officers, including the Hong Kong Auxiliary Police Force, civil servants, and its Marine Region (3,000 officers and 143 vessels as of 2009).

== History ==
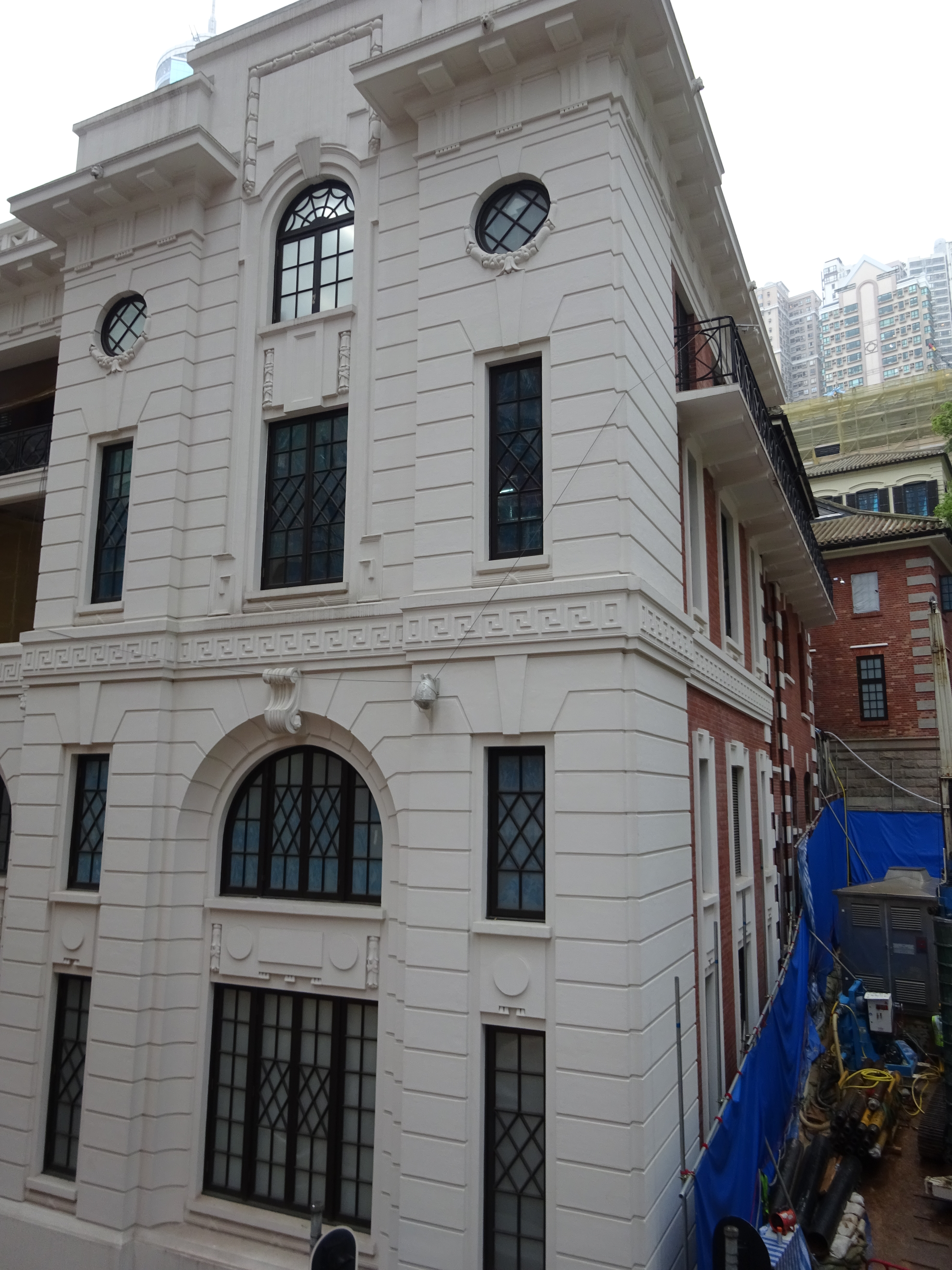
The historical Central Police Station

A police force has been serving Hong Kong since shortly after the island was established as a colony in 1841. On 30 April 1841, 12 weeks after the British landed in Hong Kong, Captain Charles Elliot established a policing authority in the new colony, empowering Captain William Caine to enforce Qing law in respect of local inhabitants and "British Police Law" for "non-natives". By October 1842, an organised police force (still under the direction of Caine who was also Chief Magistrate) was routinely bringing criminals before the courts for trial. Caine's role as head of the police force ended when its first Superintendent was appointed on 22 February 1844, Captain Haly of the 41st Madras Native Infantry. The formal establishment of the force was gazetted on 1 May 1844.

During World War II, Japan occupied Hong Kong, and the Hong Kong Police Force was temporarily disbanded. Policing duties were assumed by the Japanese Kempeitai, with Chinese officers being forced to serve alongside and officers of other ethnicities sent to Stanley Prison. Some local Chinese were also recruited as police officers, which the force retained after the liberation of Hong Kong from Japan and were given the letter designation of "J". Officers served pre-war were also reinstated into the force.

The 1950s saw the commencement of Hong Kong's 40-year rise to global prominence, during which time the Hong Kong Police tackled many issues that have challenged Hong Kong's stability. Between 1949 and 1989, Hong Kong experienced several huge waves of immigration from mainland China, most notably 1958–62. In the 1970s and 1980s, large numbers of Vietnamese boat people arrived in Hong Kong, posing challenges first for marine police, secondly for officers who were posted in the dozens of camps in the territory and lastly for those who had to repatriate them. The force was granted the use of the title ‘royal’ in 1969 for its handling of the Hong Kong 1967 riots — renaming it the Royal Hong Kong Police Force.

In 1974, the Independent Commission Against Corruption (ICAC) was created to give government wide-ranging powers to investigate corruption. At the turn of the 1980s, the Hong Kong Police Force began marketing itself as "Asia's Finest".

The recruitment of Europeans to the force ceased in 1994, and in 1995 the Royal Hong Kong Police took responsibility for patrolling the boundary with China. Prior to 1995, the British Army had operated the border patrol. The force played a prominent role in the process of the handover of Hong Kong in 1997 and continues to perform ceremonial flag-raising on each anniversary. With the change of sovereignty, the police force dropped the prefix "Royal" from its name.

In the 2010s, the police force played a prominent role in relation to the 2014 Hong Kong protests and 2019–20 Hong Kong protests. Following Chris Tang's appointment as the Commissioner of Police in November 2019, the police force changed its motto from "We serve with pride and care", which had been used for more than 20 years, to "Serving Hong Kong with honour, duty and loyalty." The Economist suggested that this change would curry favour with the central government of China. In July 2022, as part of a process to remove colonial aspects from the force, foot drills changed from British style to Chinese People's Liberation Army style with a goose step. The language spoken during drills changed from English to Chinese, and junior officers stopped addressing higher-ranking officers with "Yes Sir".

=== Controversies ===
During the 1940s, the HKPF faced a number of corruption scandals involving officers. During the 1950s and 1960s, the force struggled with corruption issues relating to bribes from syndicated drugs and illegal gambling operations. Police corruption again emerged as a major concern in the early 1970s when the Commissioner ordered investigations to break the culture of corruption, causing forty-odd officers to flee Hong Kong with more than HK$80 million cash (about HK$2 million each).

More recently, the Hong Kong Police Force has faced extensive allegations of misconduct during the 2019 protests including excessive force, brutality, torture, and falsified evidence. In particular, the police were criticised for their failure to respond during the mob attack at the Yuen Long MTR station in July 2019. Several lawsuits were filed in October 2019 against the HKPF for failure to show identification during protests.

In May 2023, the HKPF recommended that schools install CCTV cameras in school classrooms to enhance security.

From 2019 to 2022, 24 to 42 police officers were arrested per year.

== Organisation and structure ==
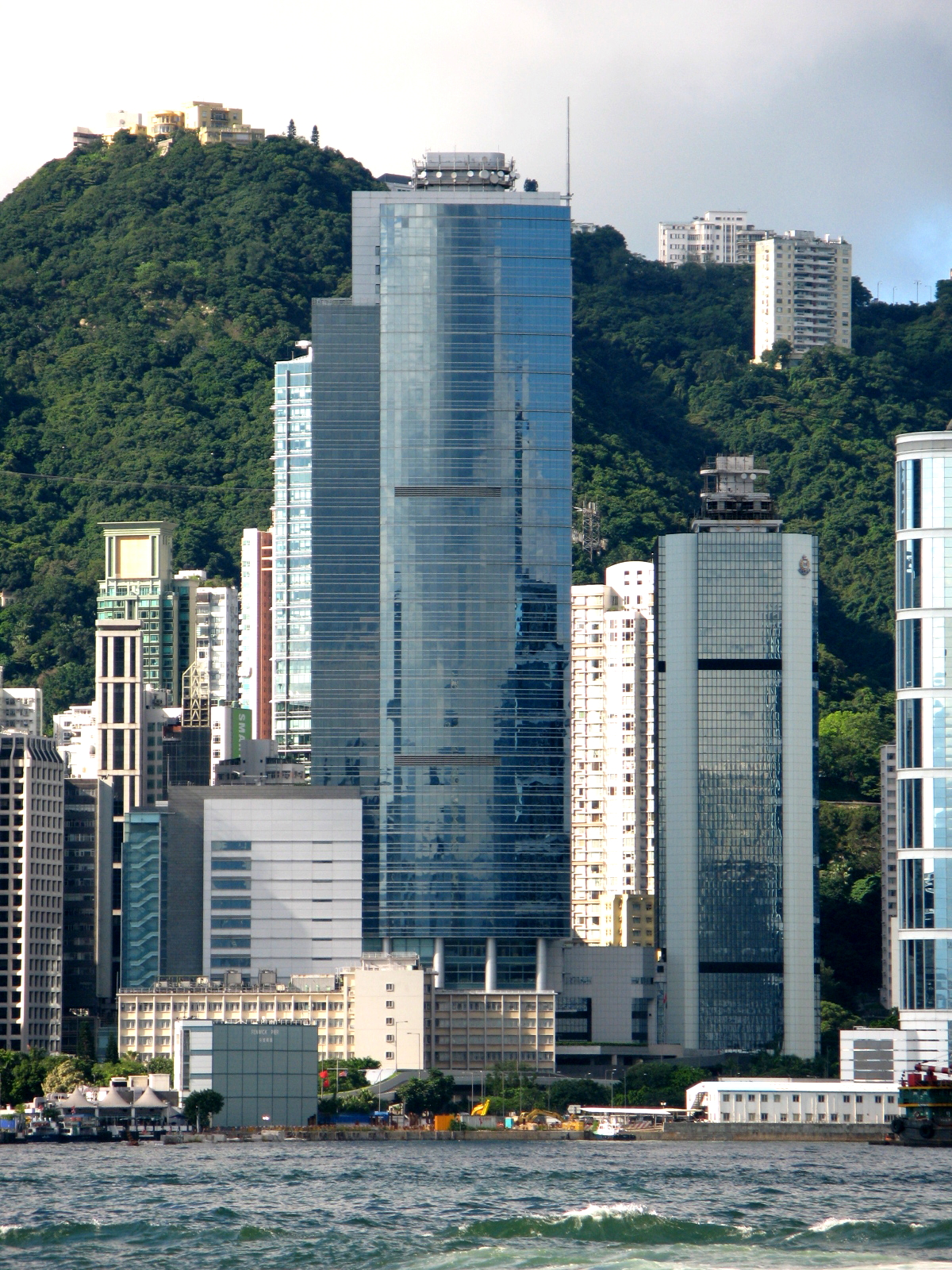
Hong Kong Police Headquarters Compound

The Commissioner of Police serves as the commander of the HKPF and reports directly to the Secretary for Security. The HKPF is divided into six primary departments: Operations & Support, Crime & Security, Personnel & Training, Management Services, Finance, Administration & Planning, and National Security.

=== Special Branch ===
The Special Branch was established by the British Colonial Government of Hong Kong in 1934 originally as an anti-communist squad under MI5 with assistance from MI6. The branch later joined the Crime Department of the Royal Hong Kong Police Force in 1946 and focussed on preventing pro-KMT rightists and pro-CCP leftists from infiltrating the colony.

== Remuneration ==
=== Salaries and fringe benefits ===
The base rate for newly recruited police constables with minimal high school education being HK$24,110 per month and that for high school matriculants being HK$42,655. In addition, all officers enjoy extensive housing benefits, free medical and dental benefits (including coverage of family members), with substantial vacation, sick and maternity leave allowances exceeding statutory minimums.

=== Police welfare fund ===
In addition, officers and their families enjoy substantial fringe benefits through the statutorily entrenched Police Welfare Fund which has current assets exceeding HK$200 million. Attracting funds in excess of HK$50 million per annum, almost entirely donations, the fund trustee, the Commissioner of Police, has unfettered freedom to choose how the funds are to be expended. The Commissioner disburses the bulk of its annual expenditure in the form of cash grants to police officers and their families.

A donation of HK$10 million by the pro-Beijing Friends of Hong Kong Association, which consists of National People’s Congress delegates and members of the Chinese People’s Political Consultative Conference national committee, in 2019, raised concern, as did a 2017 donation of HK$15 million, that fringe benefits may be inadequate.

=== Addition fringe benefits ===
Two trust funds established by statute in 1967 augment the benefits enjoyed by members of the force. The Police Children's Education Trust and Police Education & Welfare Trust disburse funds by way of scholarships, bursaries and grants for education expenses and to assist officers with needy children or in financial difficulty. These funds were also the recipients of HK$10 million in 2017 from an undisclosed donor.

== Police associations ==
Numerous associations of serving and retired police officers have been formed over the years. Currently, these include:

- Superintendents' Association
- Hong Kong Police Inspectors' Association
- Overseas Inspectors' Association
- Junior Police Officers' Association
- Royal Hong Kong Police Association

The four serving officers' associations wield significant power, controlling half of the voting rights on the Police Force Council. Government consultations with Police Force staff are formally conducted through the council and the associations figure prominently at times of controversy.

== Ranks and insignia ==
The HKPF continues to use ranks and insignia similar to those used in British police forces. Until 1997, the St Edward's Crown was used in the insignia, when it was replaced with the Bauhinia flower crest of the Hong Kong government. Pips were modified with the Bauhinia flower in the middle replacing the insignia from the Order of the Bath. The crest of the force was modified in 1997. The rank structure, organisation and insignia are similar to those used by the Metropolitan Police Service until the mid-1970s.

Rank	Abbreviation	Insignia	Description
Gazetted
Commissioner of Police (警務處處長)	CP		crest over pip over wreathed and crossed batons.
Deputy Commissioner of Police (警務處副處長)	DCP		crest over wreathed and crossed batons.
Senior Assistant Commissioner of Police (警務處高級助理處長)	SACP		pip over wreathed and crossed batons.
Assistant Commissioner of Police (警務處助理處長)	ACP		wreathed and crossed batons.
Chief Superintendent of Police (總警司)	CSP		crest over two pips.
Senior Superintendent of Police (高級警司)	SSP		crest over pip.
Superintendent of Police (警司)	SP		crest.
Inspectorate
Chief Inspector of Police (總督察)	CIP		three pips.
Senior Inspector of Police (高級督察)	SIP		two pips over bar.
Inspector of Police (督察)	IP		two pips.
Probationary Inspector of Police (見習督察)	PI		pip.
Junior police officers (JPOs)
Non-commissioned officers (NCOs)
Station Sergeant (警署警長)	SSGT		wreathed crest.
Sergeant (警長)	SGT		three downward-pointing chevrons.
Rank and file
Senior Police Constable (高級警員)	SPC		one downward-pointing chevron.
Police Constable (警員)	PC		ID number.

Up until 1997, uniforms and hats had distinctions according to their rank. For example, senior constable and sergeant ranks are plastic ranks on the sleeve of the uniform. Special Duties Unit, Marine Police, and the Counter-terrorism Response Unit have their ranks at the back of the helmet or vest. Inspector to senior superintendent ranks have an insignia on the collar of the uniform. Chief Inspectors have a wide black stripe fitted on their police hats. Superintendents also have a small white stripe fitted on the police hat. Senior Superintendents and Chief Superintendents have a wide white stripe on their hats, Assistant and Senior Assistant Commissioners have 1 row of silver oak leaves on the edge of their hats while Deputy Commissioner and Commissioner has 2 rows of silver oak leaves, a slide with a silver vertical line on the collar of the uniform, a black baton, and a red whistle or a black and white whistle on the front right pocket.

== Uniforms ==
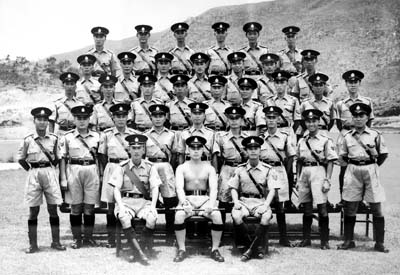
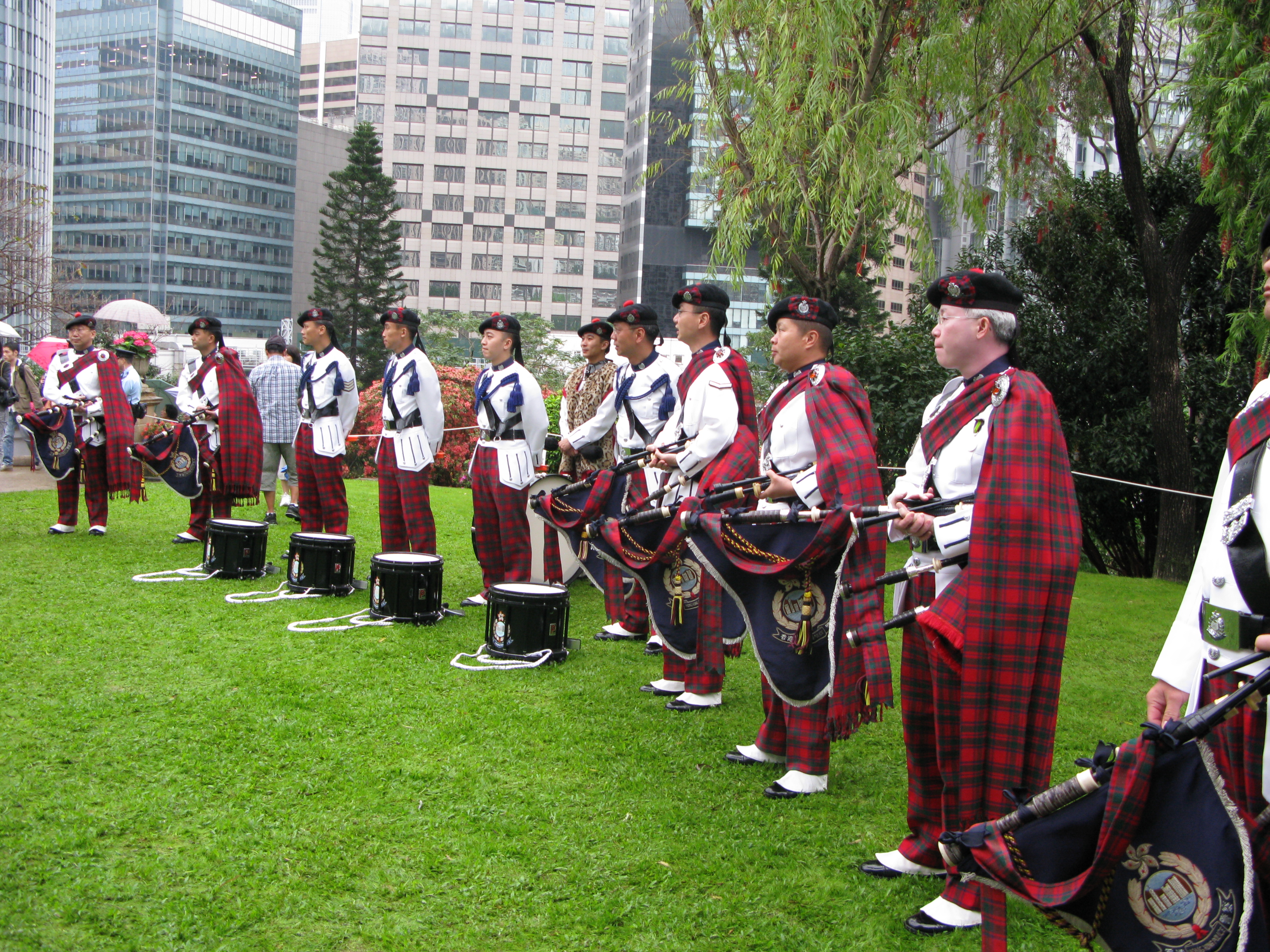
Police officers in summer uniform in 1954. Everything, except for the shorts, was used until 2005 (left), Hong Kong Police Pipe Band performance in Government House (right)

=== Current ===
The current Hong Kong Police uniform was implemented in 2005. Most front-line officers wear a light blue shirt and dark blue cargo trousers, while senior officers wear a white shirt.

A long-sleeved shirt is worn with a black necktie, while a short-sleeved shirt can be worn with an open collar in warm weather. A waist-length dark blue windbreaker can also be worn over the shirt in cooler temperatures.

Male officers typically wear a black peaked cap while female officers wear a black bowler hat with a red stripe. Dark-blue baseball caps may also be worn, which was permitted from September 2022 while the peaked cap was reserved for events or interviews. Specialized units like the PTU, Marine officers, the Driving Cadre and Emergency Unit wear berets.

The uniform also does not include shoulder patches. Instead, a silver HKPF emblem is displayed on the headgear. The only patch on the uniform reads “Police” in English and Chinese, and is sewn above the left breast pocket of the shirt. Navy blue epaulettes worn on all uniform shirts and jackets show the officer's rank insignia (if any) and unique identification number.

HKPF officers do not wear a badge, but instead carry a Warrant card for identification. Having a WC is needed for HKPF officers who identify themselves when they are not in uniform.

=== Others ===
Type	Description
Traffic Branch Motorcyclists	A heavy, bright, yellow and blue reflective jacket is worn. In warmer weather, a lightweight yellow reflective vest is an alternative. Black knee-high leather riding boots are also worn with navy blue riding trousers, along with protective gear such as gloves and a white helmet. A blue baseball-style cap is worn when not riding.
Rural Patrol Unit	Cargo shirt and trousers in olive green are worn with either a dark blue baseball-style cap or a navy blue beret. Cargo shirt and trousers in Disruptive Pattern Camouflage is also sometimes worn.
Other specialized units	In some specialized units, a cargo shirt is worn in either olive green, dark blue, or disruptive pattern camouflage (depending on the unit), along with matching cargo trousers, and a navy blue beret or a dark blue baseball-style cap.

=== Ceremonial ===
Ceremonial uniforms include either a white (similar to No.3 Warm weather ceremonial uniform) or navy blue tunic (similar to the old winter uniform). Sword design was based on 1897 pattern British Army infantry officer's sword and used for formal occasions such as parade out or Legal Opening Day.

They are fitted with a black whistle on the front right pocket and insignia on the collar for commissioned officers. A Sam Browne belt is also worn.

=== Retired variants ===
The previous uniforms were reminiscent of the British colonial era from 1973. They were replaced with what were intended to be more modern, international, and cosmopolitan uniforms in 2005.

Type	Description
Retired summer uniform	A short-sleeved olive green tunic-style tropical field shirt, and olive green trousers worn with a black Sam Browne belt with shoulder strap. Female officers wore a short-sleeved beige shirt with a knee-length skirt until 1995 when they were given the same uniform as male officers (without the shoulder strap). Bermuda shorts were worn by male officers instead of trousers from the early 20th century until 1977.
Retired winter uniform	A cornflower blue (or white, for commissioned officers) shirt with a blue and red striped necktie, worn under a heavy navy blue tunic coat and a Sam Browne Belt with shoulder strap, and navy blue trousers. The tunic may be removed and shirt sleeves folded up to the elbows when working indoors or in warmer weather.
Retired headgear	In some specialized units, a cargo shirt is worn in either olive green, dark blue, or disruptive pattern camouflage (depending on the unit), along with matching cargo trousers, and a navy blue beret or a dark blue baseball-style cap.

Until 1998, all officers wore a black whistle lanyard over the left shoulder running under the epaulet with the double cord attached to a whistle tucked in to the left breast tunic pocket. Officers who had received a Commissioner of Police Commendation or HE Governor's Commendation were issued a plaited black, yellow and red lanyard for CP's Commendation, or red for Governor's.

== Equipment ==
Uniform officers wear a utility belt which holds a sidearm, extra ammunition, a handcuff, an extendable baton, a pepper spray, a Motorola radio with a connected remote speaker microphone attached to the shoulder and a body-mounted camera.

While the HKPF had initially continued to procure equipment from Western countries, following the US and EU arms embargo imposed after the passing of the National Security Law in 2020, the HKPF had started importing firearms from mainland China to refresh their inventory.

Model	Type	Origin	Status	User	References
Smith & Wesson Model 10	Revolver	United States	Under replacement	Uniformed officers, including Police Tactical Unit and Police Dog Unit	
CF98A	Semi-automatic pistol	China	Future standard issue	Uniformed officers, including Police Tactical Unit and Police Dog Unit	
SIG Sauer P250	Semi-automatic pistol	United States	Under replacement	Criminal Investigations detectives	
CS/LP5	Semi-automatic pistol	China	Future standard issue	Criminal Investigations detectives	
Glock 17	Semi-automatic pistol	Austria	Current	Special Duties Unit, Airport Security Unit, Special Tactical Squad, Counter Terrorism Response Unit, VIP Protection Unit, Witness Protection Unit, Small Boat Division, CIB Hit Team	
Glock 19	Semi-automatic pistol	Austria	Current	Special Duties Unit, Airport Security Unit, Special Tactical Squad, Counter Terrorism Response Unit, VIP Protection Unit, Witness Protection Unit, Small Boat Division, CIB Hit Team	
Heckler & Koch MP5	Submachine gun	Germany	Current	Special Duties Unit, Airport Security Unit, Special Tactical Squad, Counter Terrorism Response Unit, VIP Protection Unit, Witness Protection Unit, Marine Region, Criminal Investigations detectives, Emergency Unit	
SIG Sauer MPX	Submachine gun	United States	Current	Counter Terrorism Response Unit, CIB Hit Team	
CS/LS7	Submachine gun	China	Current	Counter Terrorism Response Unit, Airport Security Unit	
Remington 870	Shotgun	United States	Current	Police Tactical Unit, Emergency Unit, Criminal Investigations detectives, VIP Protection Unit, Witness Protection Unit, Special Duties Unit, Special Tactical Squad	
Kel-Tec KSG	Shotgun	United States	Current	VIP Protection Unit, Witness Protection Unit	
Colt AR-15	Semi-automatic rifle	United States	Current	Police Tactical Unit, Emergency Unit	
SIG Sauer SIG516	Assault rifle	United States	Current	Special Duties Unit, Special Tactical Squad, Counter Terrorism Response Unit, Small Boat Division, CIB Hit Team	
SIG Sauer MCX VIRTUS	Assault rifle	United States	Current	Special Duties Unit	
KAC SR-16 M4	Assault rifle	United States	Current	Airport Security Unit	
Type 56	Semi-automatic rifle	China	Current	Ceremonial purposes only	
QBZ-95-1	Assault rifle	China	Current	Ceremonial purposes only	
QBZ-191	Assault rifle	China	Current	Ceremonial purposes only	
Accuracy International AX308	Sniper rifle	United Kingdom	Current	Special Duties Unit	
SIG Sauer SSG 3000	Sniper rifle	Germany	Current	Special Duties Unit	
CS/LR4	Sniper rifle	China	Current	Special Duties Unit	
CS/LR35	Sniper rifle	China	Current	Special Duties Unit	
KAC SR-25	Sniper rifle	United States	Current	Special Duties Unit	
Accuracy International AS50	Sniper rifle	United Kingdom	Current	Special Duties Unit	
Federal Riot Gun	Grenade launchers and riot guns	United States	Current	Police Tactical Unit, Special Tactical Squad	
Penn Arms GL1	Grenade launchers and riot guns	United States	Current	Police Tactical Unit, Special Tactical Squad	
ARWEN 37	Grenade launchers and riot guns	United Kingdom	Current	Special Duties Unit, Special Tactical Squad	
Brügger & Thomet GL06	Grenade launchers and riot guns	Switzerland	Current	Special Duties Unit, Special Tactical Squad	
M320 GLM	Grenade launchers and riot guns	USA	Current	Special Duties Unit, Special Tactical Squad	
Variable Kinetic System	Grenade launchers and riot guns	USA	Current	Special Tactical Squad	
Tippmann 98 Custom Plantinum	Grenade launchers and riot guns	USA		Special Tactical Squad	
Byrna HD	Grenade launchers and riot guns	South Africa	Police Tactical Unit		

== Vehicles ==
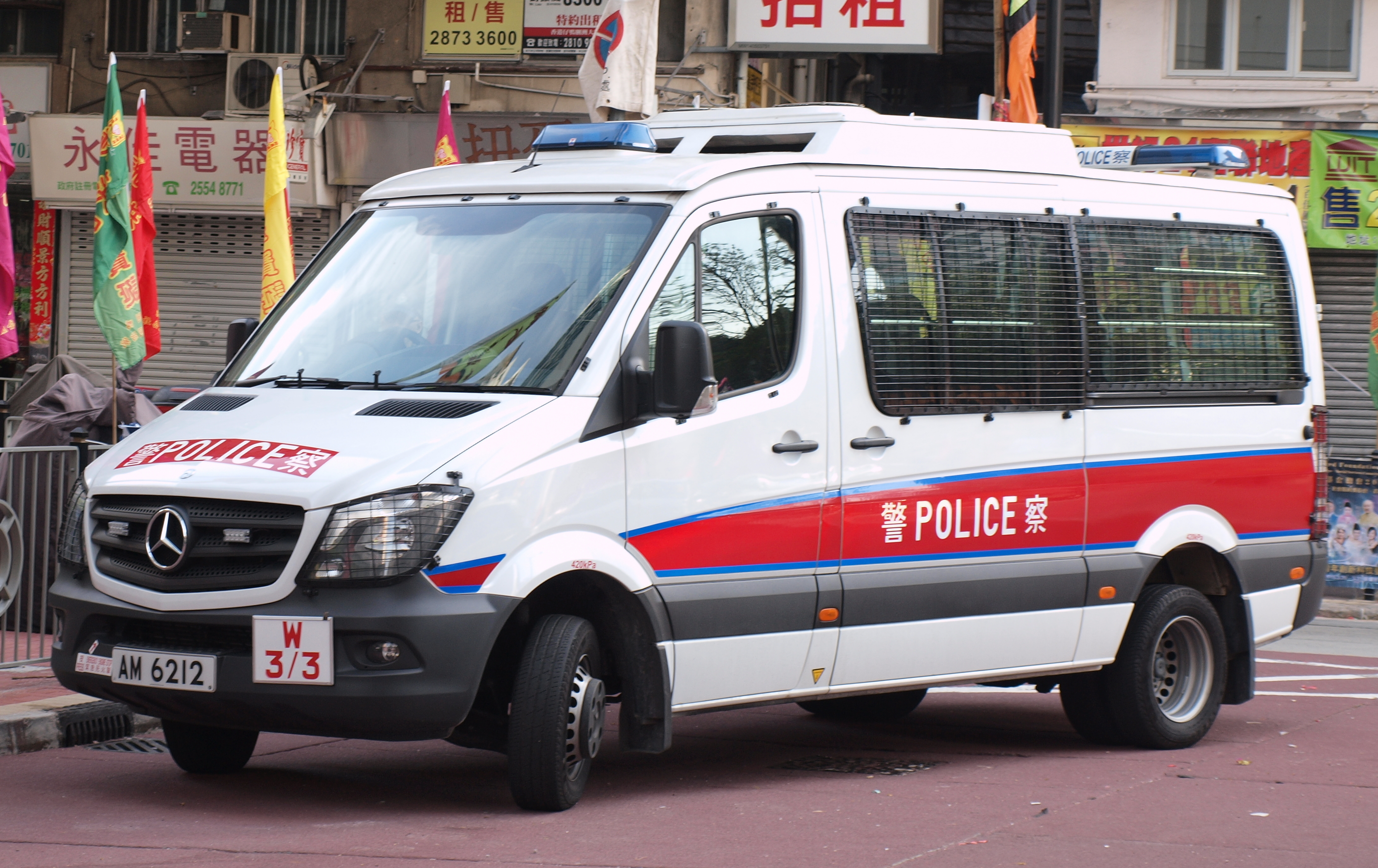
A police van

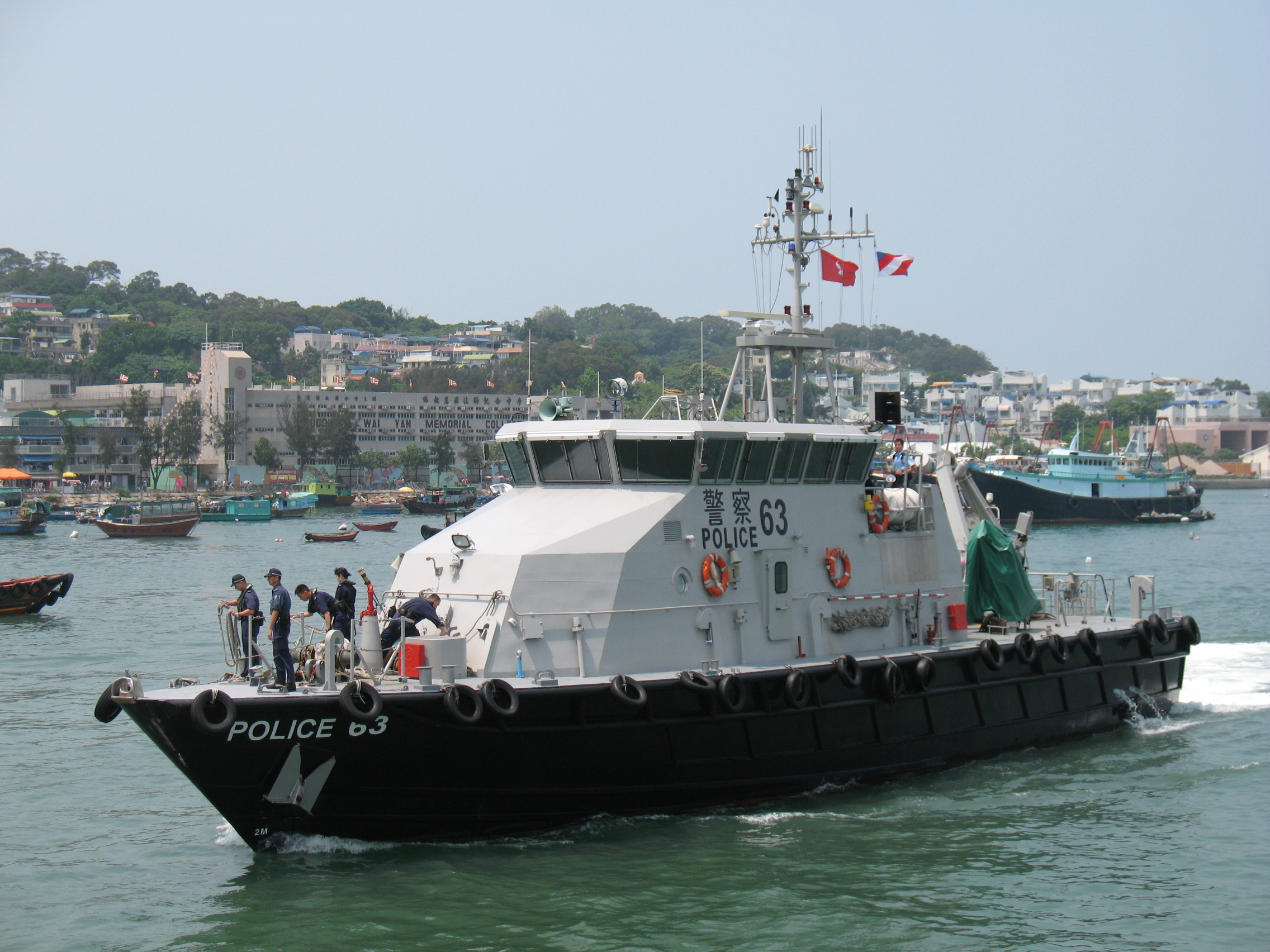
HKPF Police Patrol Boat

Most police vehicles in Hong Kong are white, with a blue and red 3M retroreflective stripe around on the sides of the vehicle with wording "警 POLICE 察" in white, the only exception being the armoured personnel carriers specially designed for the Police Tactical Unit, which are wholly dark blue and with wording "警 POLICE 察" on a light blue background in white on the sides of the vehicle. Most police vehicles in Hong Kong are equipped with both red and blue emergency vehicle lighting. The vehicles which are assigned to airport duties have additional yellow emergency vehicle lighting and yellow rooftops required for all airport vehicles. All police vehicles are government property and so bear license plates starting with "AM".

Since 2008, the Hong Kong Police Force have brought in the use of Battenburg markings for new police vehicles of the Traffic Branch for better visibility on the roads. In addition, these new vehicles show the Force crest on the front part of the vehicle, which the Force has not used in the design of new vehicles for the last two decades.

The Hong Kong Police Force has ordered 10 new electric scooters for their officers to help reduce pollution in central Hong Kong. Emergency Unit, Police Tactical Unit, and Traffic Police have identification markings on the back of the car. For example, PTUD 1/3 means PTU D Team 1st Team 3rd car; EUKW 23 means Emergency Unit, Kowloon West region, 23rd car; and TKW 2 means Traffic unit, Kowloon West region, second car. Until 2007, EU, PTU, and TP vehicles had identification markings in a slightly different format. For example, “1/3 PTUD”, “23 EUKW”, and “2 TKW”.

== In popular culture ==
The Hong Kong Police Force and its previous incarnation have been the subject of many films and television shows, including the locally produced Police Story film series, The Criminal Investigator, Infernal Affairs film series, Cold War, and OCTB. English language films featuring the HKPF include Rush Hour and Skyscraper. A 9 episode documentary series called the Hong Kong Beat was also produced by the BBC in the late 1970s.

The Hong Kong Police Force and Special Duties Unit have also appeared in popular video game series such as Tom Clancy's Rainbow Six Siege and Sleeping Dogs.

== Notable personnel ==
- Eric Blackburn OBE, QPM, CPM Deputy/Acting Commissioner
- John Lee Ka-chiu, Chief Executive of Hong Kong
- William Caine, first Head of Police
- Nick Cheung, actor and director
- Peter Godber Chief Superintendent serving as Deputy District Commander of Kowloon who was embroiled in a bribery scandal in 1973 and absconded
- Eddie Hui, last Commissioner of the Royal Hong Kong Police Force and first Commissioner of the Hong Kong Police Force
- Raymon Anning Last Briton Commissioner of the Hong Kong Police Force from 1985 to 1989
- Li Kwan-ha, first ethnic Chinese Commissioner of the Hong Kong Police Force
- Stephen Lo Wai-chung, Commissioner of the Hong Kong Police Force from 2015 to 2019
- Lui Lok, notorious corrupt police officer
- Joe Ma Tak-chung, actor
- Rupert Dover, English-born officer
- David John Jordan, English-born officer
- Tsui Po-ko, murderer and bank robber
- Lord Sharpe, British politician
- Lai Ka-ying, former superintendent and first Hong Kong astronaut

== See also ==
- Crime in Hong Kong
- Law enforcement in Hong Kong
- Police misconduct allegations during the 2019–2020 Hong Kong protests
- Public Security Police Force
- People’s Police of China
- Hong Kong Police College
