= Counter Terrorism Response Unit =

Hong Kong police tactical unit

- 反恐特勤隊 (Chinese)
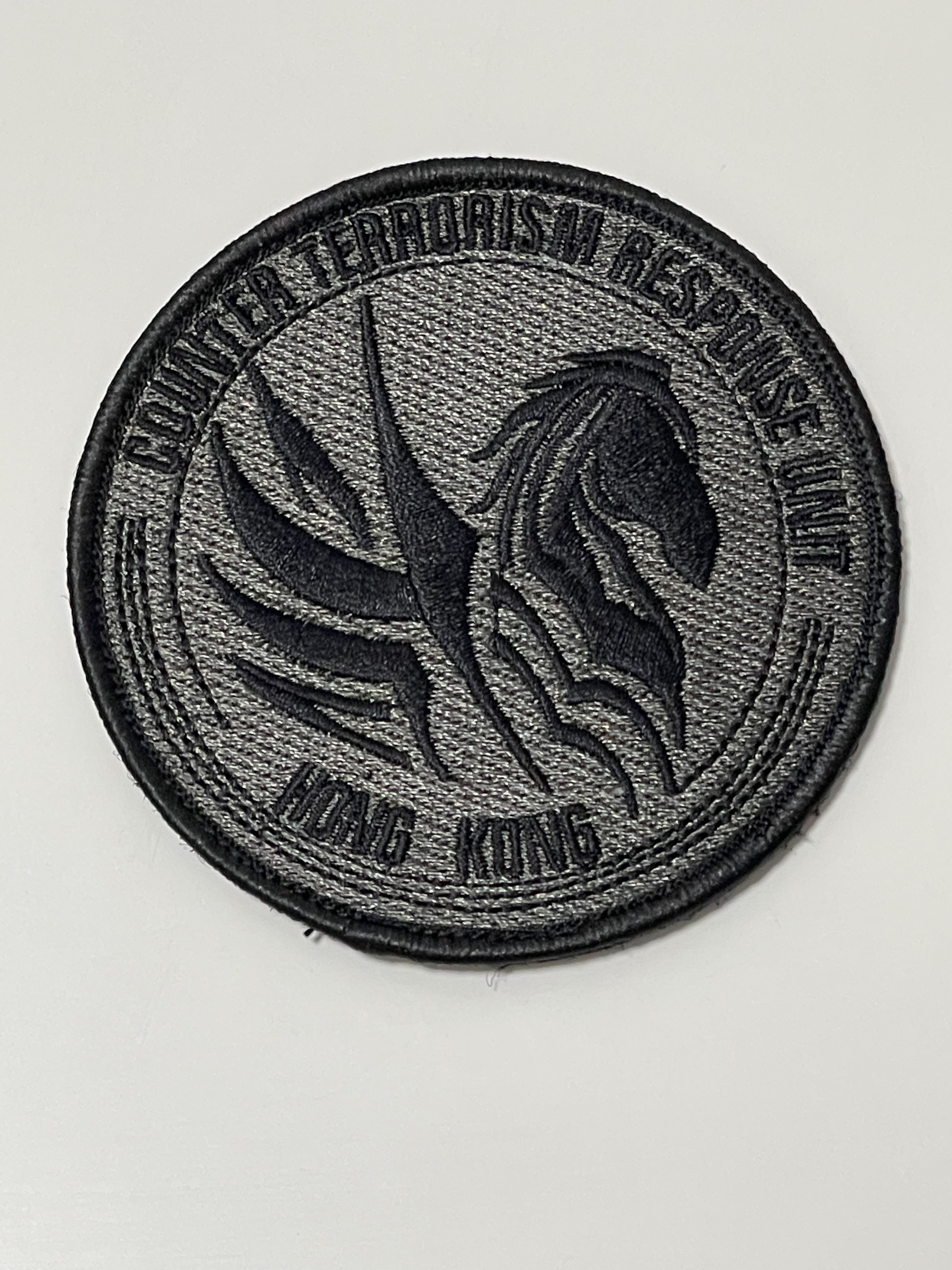
- Current CTRU patch
- Active: July 2009 – present
- Country: Hong Kong; China
- Agency: Hong Kong Police Force
- Type: Police tactical unit
- Role: Counter-terrorism; Law enforcement
- Part of: Counter Terrorism and Major Incidents Bureau
- Motto: 關懷與勇毅; Cares and Dares
- Abbreviation: CTRU

Structure
- Officers: 141 (2011)

The Counter Terrorism Response Unit (CTRU) (Simplified Chinese: 反恐特勤队; Traditional Chinese: 反恐特勤隊) is a police tactical unit of the Hong Kong Police Force (HKPF). It was the first police unit in Asia dedicated to counterterrorism and hostage rescue patrols.

== History ==
The CTRU was established in July 2009 with support from the HKSAR government. In December 2010, the CTRU was deployed on its first operation to protect the East Asian Games with the SDU and VIP Protection Unit.

In June 2022, the police force publicly unveiled a grey-blue uniform for the CTRU.

In May 2024, the HKPF announced that the Railway Response Team (RRT) would be absorbed into the CTRU. The RRT had been established in 2018.

== Duties ==
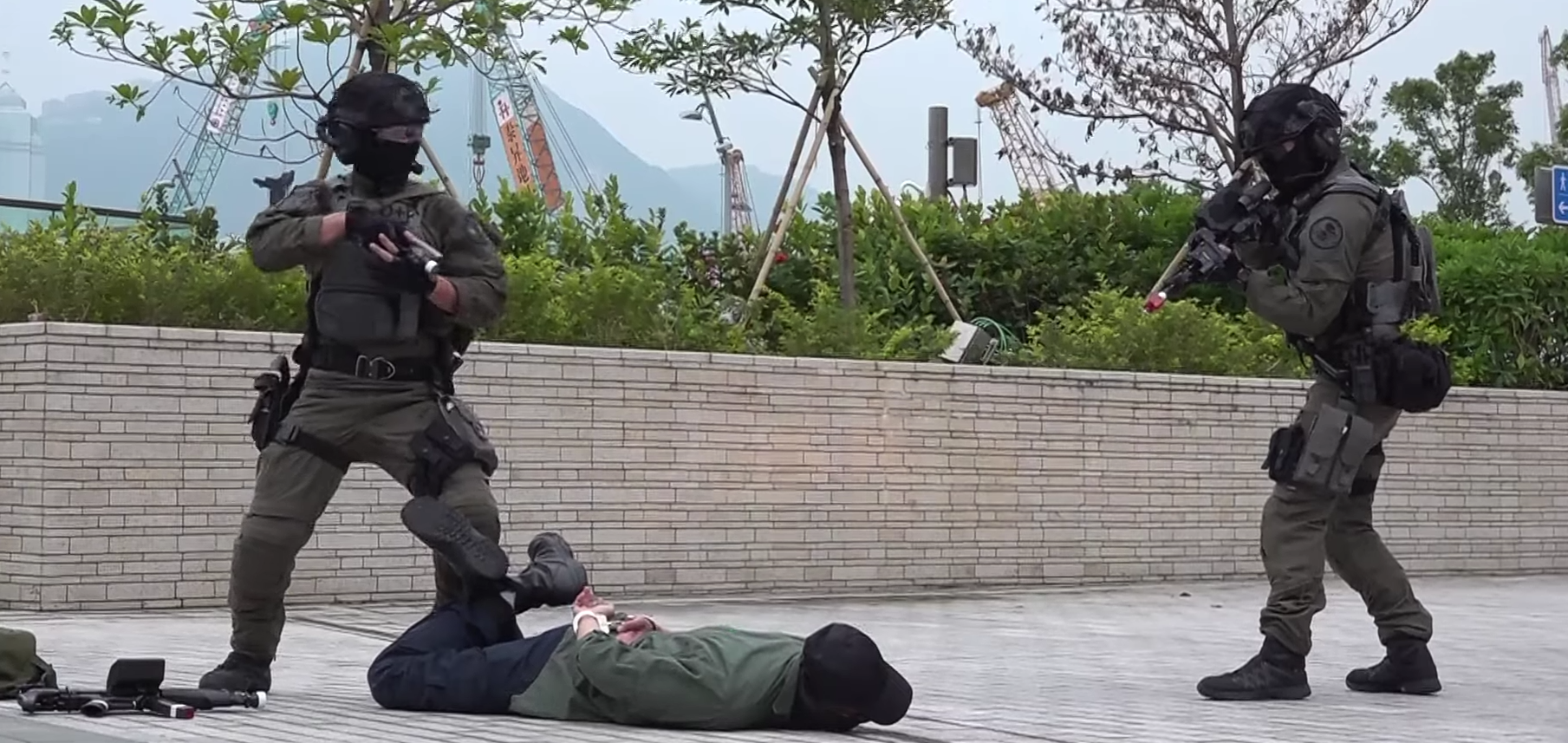
CTRU operators arrest a suspect during a public event in 2021.

The jurisdiction of the CTRU covers the whole of HKSAR, except for the Hong Kong International Airport which is under the protection of Airport Security Unit. The CTRU executes tasks by the counterterrorism strategies, which is 'Defense, protection, guard, investigation and restoration', of the Police Force and assists the SDU if necessary.

The CTRU is responsible for the security of government buildings, LOCPG, Diplomatic missions, infrastructures, ports, railways, gathering places (including HKCEC) and any structures with potential terrorist threats. The unit is tasked "to handle bomb threats, escort explosives or CBRN materials".

== Organization ==
The CTRU's structure is reportedly based on the NYPD's Hercules Team.

- CTRU Headquarters: receiving direct orders from the Counter-terrorism Department.
  - Operation: At the beginning of CTRU's establishment, the number of the force is projected to reach 141 (reached in 2012)
    - Action Squad (Cougar)
    - Action Squad (Trooper)
    - Action Squad (Ranger)
    - Action Squad (Unicorn)
  - Training and development

=== Training ===
Prospective CTRU recruits must attend 10 weeks of intensive training courses.

== Equipment ==
=== Personal equipment ===
- Combat helmet
  - Team Wendy Exfil LTP Ballistic
  - Garanti Kompozit Ballistic Protective Helmet (ACH HIGH-CUT MODEL)
  - Ops-Core FAST XP High Cut (For former RRT members)
- Noise-cancelling headphones
  - 3M Peltor Tactical 6 Headset
  - Safariland LIBERATOR IV Headset
  - Ops-Core AMP Headset
  - EARMOUR M31 Series Headset (For former RRT members)
- Gas mask
  - Avon S10
  - Avon fm54
- Tactical vest
  - ESKI custom made Plate Carrier
  - C2R-MOR Ultralite Plate Carrier
  - Ops Rapid Responder Armor Plate Carrier (For former RRT members)
- Danner 15404, LOWA
- Ballistic shield
  - BAKER BALLISTIC custom-made Ballistic Shield
  - ATFY custom made Ballistic Shield
- Axe
- Mark 3 Knife

=== Communication equipment ===
- Motorola MTP850Ex
- Survival lamps
- NV goggles
- Thermal scopes

=== Rescue equipment ===
- Tactical Axe
- Ladder

=== Medical equipment ===
- First aid
- Powerheart AED G3
- Pulse oximeter

=== Weapons ===
Name	Country of origin	Type	Notes	References
Glock 17	Austria	Semi-automatic pistol	Standard issue	
Glock 19	Austria	Semi-automatic pistol	Used by female members and during plainclothes duties	
Heckler & Koch MP5	Germany	Submachine gun	Standard issue	
SIG MPX	United States	Submachine gun	Inherited from the now merged Railway Response Team	
CS/LS7	PRC	Submachine gun	Issued since 2026	
SIG 516	United States	Assault rifle	Issued since 2017	

=== Vehicle ===
- Mercedes-Benz Sprinter 518CDI
- Toyota HiAce
- Toyota Land Cruiser
