= CS/LS7 =

QCQ-171 (CS/LS7)
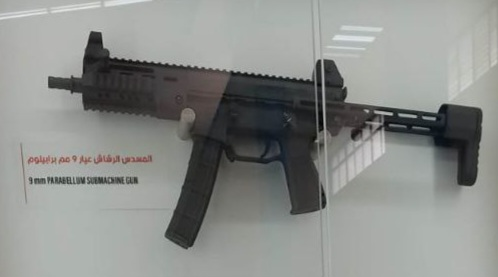
- CS/LS7 in Algeria
- Type: Submachine gun
- Place of origin: China

Service history
- In service: 2016–present
- Used by: See Users

Production history
- Designer: Jianshe Industry (Group) Corporation
- Designed: 2010s
- Manufacturer: China South Industries Group
- Produced: 2016–present
- Variants: See Variants

Specifications
- Mass: CS/LS7A: 2.8 kg (6.2 lb); CS/LS7B: 2.6 kg (5.7 lb); CS/LS7C: 2.8 kg (6.2 lb); CS/LS7D: 2.1 kg (4.6 lb); with empty magazine
- Length: CS/LS7A: 650 mm (26 in); CS/LS7B: 670 mm (26.4 in) stock extended / 432 mm (17.0 in) stock folded; CS/LS7C: 680 mm (26.8 in) stock extended / 480 mm (18.9 in) stock collapsed; CS/LS7D: 340 mm (13 in)
- Barrel length: 216 mm (8.5 in)
- Cartridge: 9×19mm DAP92-9; 9×19mm Parabellum
- Action: Blowback, closed bolt
- Effective firing range: 200 m (656 ft)
- Feed system: 20- or 30-round detachable box magazine, and 100-round drum magazine
- Sights: Picatinny rail-mounted front and rear iron sights with space for various optics

The CS/LS7 is a Chinese submachine gun developed by the Jianshe Industries (Group) Corporation of Chongqing, chambered in the 9×19mm DAP-92-9 or 9×19mm Parabellum ammunitions.

== History ==
The CS/LS7 is part of a weapon development program initiated by the Ministry of Public Security to acquire a new type of submachine gun, replacing the older Type 79 submachine gun.

After trials, the CS/LS7 was selected to be the next-generation submachine gun for the Chinese police force, and was first showcased on the 70th anniversary of the People's Republic of China parade in 2019. Initially, the Chinese military had no request of any submachine gun, thus initially the CS/LS7 has no official military designation from the People's Liberation Army (PLA).

In 2021, CS/LS7 was reportedly to replace QCW-05 submachine guns in the PLA service.

== Design ==
The CS/LS7 uses blowback, closed bolt operation. The upper receiver is made of metal, while the lower receiver is made of polymer material. The weapon has an ambidextrous charging handle, fire selector, and lengthened magazine release lever located in front of the trigger guard. The telescopic stock can be removed and replaced with a fixed stock. The bolt release is located on the left side above the magazine well.

The weapon features a full-length picatinny rail on top of the upper receiver and handguard. Three short Picatinny rails are mounted on the 3, 6, and 12 o'clock positions of the handguard. A secondary handguard option has a Picatinny rail only on the receiver and the 6 o'clock position of the handguard. The third option, seen in the hands of PLA soldiers on the 70th anniversary parade, features short Picatinny rails mounted on 6 and 9 o'clock positions, but not on 3 and 12. It's possible that handguard configurations can be changed upon customer requests. The handguard can also be replaced with an integrated front grip, similar to that of MP5K. The weapon can be fitted with a QMQ-171 holographic sight, silencer, and other attachments.

== Variants ==
CS/LS7A
Variant of the CS/LS7 with a fixed stock.

CS/LS7B
Variant of the CS/LS7 with a folding adjustable stock.

CS/LS7C
Variant of the CS/LS7 with a retractable stock.

CS/LS7D
Compact variant of the CS/LS7 with a shorter barrel, no stock, and handguard featuring an integral foregrip.

QCQ-171
Variant of the CS/LS7 used by the People's Liberation Army and some Chinese Special Police (SWAT) units. Its hanguard only allows for a right-side charging handle and lacks Picatinny rails along its top and sides. Some are seen with a Picatinny rail along the underside of the handguard, often used to mount a foregrip.

== Users ==
- Algeria: Manufactured locally by ECMK for the Algerian Army
- China
  - People's Liberation Army
    - People's Liberation Army Rocket Force
    - Special forces of all branches
  - Ministry of Public Security
    - National Immigration Administration
    - Public Security SWAT in Fuzhou, Hainan, Kashgar, Shanghai, Wuhan, and Zhejiang
  - People's Armed Police
  - Hong Kong
    - Hong Kong Police Force
      - Counter Terrorism Response Unit
      - Airport Security Unit
- Iraq: Manufactured or assembled locally
- Mali
- Venezuela: Used by the Venezuelan Army, including special forces

== See also ==
- CS/LS5
- CS/LS6
