= Special Duties Unit =

Hong Kong Police tactical unit

- 特別任務連 (Chinese)
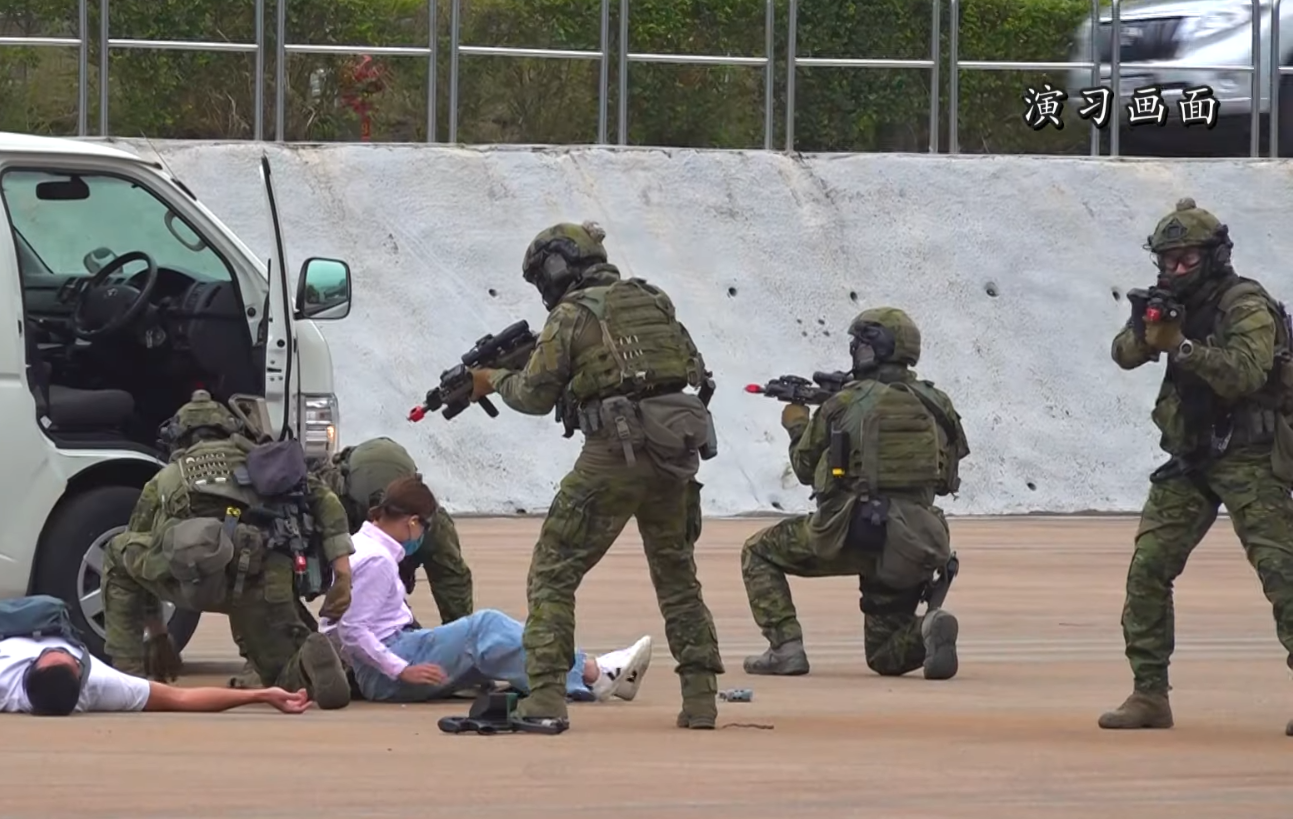
- Special Duties Unit in 2021
- Active: 23 July 1974 – present
- Country: Hong Kong (1974-1997); Hong Kong (1997-Present); China
- Agency: Hong Kong Police Force
- Type: Police tactical unit
- Role: Counter-terrorism; Law enforcement; Underwater search and recovery
- Part of: Counter Terrorism and Major Incidents Bureau
- Headquarters: 1 Wu Tip Shan Road, Fanling
- Motto: "Strength, Discipline, Unity"
- Common name: Flying Tigers
- Abbreviation: SDU

Structure
- Officers: Over 120
- Subunits: See Organisations

Notables
- Significant operation(s): See Known operations

The Special Duties Unit (SDU; Chinese: 特別任務連), nicknamed the "Flying Tigers" (Chinese: 飛虎隊), is a police tactical unit of the Hong Kong Police Force tasked with countering terrorist attacks, hostage rescue, underwater search and recovery, and tackling serious crime involving firearms.

The Hong Kong Police Force (HKPF) comprises two other tactical units, the Airport Security Unit and the Counter Terrorism Response Unit; the SDU is the primary tactical unit of the HKPF.

In 2024, the SDU was placed under the command of the Counter Terrorism and Major Incidents Bureau which is part of 'A' Department Operations Wing. The SDU is based in Fanling.

== History ==
=== Prior ===
In the aftermath of a hijacking of a Philippine Airlines jet in 1971, the British Hong Kong government decided to raise a police tactical unit within the RHKP. The unit was known as the Marksman Unit (Chinese: 神槍手隊). Officers recruited to MU received British training at the time.

MU officers were deployed in 1973 in the hijacking of a Thai Airways jet and on 24 May 1974 during an armed robbery incident at Po Sang Bank. In 1974, the MU was renamed to the SDU and became a dedicated full-time unit to deal with terrorist attacks and serious crimes involving firearms.

=== SDU activation ===
The SDU was established in 1974 by the British Hong Kong Government, taking over MU’s role. The SDU, then consisting of ten odd members, used existing police weaponry and devised their own tactics.

In early 1978, the British Special Air Service sent an advisory team to Hong Kong, which was initially to evaluate the SDU and subsequently trained two land assault teams resulting in considerable changes to SDU equipment and tactics. In 1982, the British Special Boat Service sent an advisory team to Hong Kong to establish a water assault team including training in military diving.

=== Known operations ===
- 1992: During a raid, the Unit was met with heavy resistance by four jewel robbers armed with AK assault rifles and hand grenades. Seven officers, including members of the Unit, were severely injured from a grenade blast. As a result of the incident, the Unit's Close Quarters Battle techniques were further refined to fit Hong Kong's unique urban environment and new equipment was added to the unit's arsenal. All suspects were apprehended.
- 2003: Kwai Ping-hung, the most wanted person in Hong Kong, was arrested in his flat in a raid by the Unit with no shots fired. This was the most high-profile arrest made in Hong Kong's history.
- 2005: During the World Trade Organization Ministerial Conference of 2005 in Hong Kong, the Unit was deployed to protect WTO delegates.
- 2014: In a heavily televised standoff, the Unit was deployed to a flat in a residential skyscraper in Kowloon Bay after a disgruntled man armed with a heavy calibre pistol shot and killed another man in the building and barricaded himself in the flat. Multiple shots were exchanged, along with the use of flashbang grenades, which were clearly seen and heard on live television. Several SDU officers breached the flat through the front door while others rappelled from the roof of the skyscraper and entered the flat through the windows. By the time the officers reached the man, he had shot himself. The man later died from suicide.
- 2019: During the Christchurch mosque shootings, two members of the Unit training in Christchurch helped respond to the shooting alongside local police by providing medical treatment to victims of the attacks.
- 2019-2020: During the anti-extradition protests, SDU operators as part of the Special Tactical Contingent (STC) took part in riot control duties. Amnesty International accused the STC of excessive force, claiming that the STC was responsible for "the worst violence" by the police force. Apple Daily reported that SDU operators disguised as protesters provoked fights with protestors in order for them to be arrested. Newtalk reported that SDU operators disguised as protestors committed illegal acts such as setting fire on the street as part of a false flag operation. Police arrested a Hong Kong Museum of History employee for obstruction who uploaded photos to social media of a SDU observation post in the museum that was observing the Hong Kong Polytechnic University.

== Organisation ==
The Special Duties Unit consists of a support group, administration group, and the action group. The action group is the core of the SDU, further categorized into the assault team and the sniper team.

The SDU structure consists of the following as of 2014:

- Administration Group (Headquarters) which is responsible for all administrative works, as well as providing intelligence to operations
- Action Group
  - Assault Teams
    - Team A, Team B, Team C (Training of SDU officers)
    - Sniper Team
  - Boat Team: Provides sea transportation for the assault team, and maintains the SDU fleet of small vessels
- Support Group
  - Medical Support Team: Consists of combat medics who perform operations along the assault team
  - Transportation Team: Maintains the SDU fleet of land vehicles

The SDU has five Belgian Shepherd dogs.

== Selection and training ==
A volunteer for the SDU has to successfully complete an 11-day selection course known as Hell Week which is held annually that has a success rate of only 25%. After successfully completing selection, the applicant is required to complete a nine-month training course that includes weapons handling and marksmanship, tactical movement, unarmed combat, breaching, climbing and roping, chemical, biological, radiological and nuclear incidents, and combat medicine. Applications are open to women officers, with no female officers to date. Between 1974 and 2014, 383 officers had served in the SDU.

Prior to 1998, the SDU selection course was 10 to 14 days in length with most of the emphasis placed on physical endurance. In 1998, this changed to a basic four-day selection course with more emphasis on mental attributes than physical ones. Those who successfully passed the basic selection course were given a five-week build-up course followed by a week-long advanced selection course. The course concentrated on weapons handling and use, elementary close-quarter battle, camouflage and concealment, physical fitness, observation and commentary, first aid, and map reading. For the period 1998–99, 44 officers applied with 14 selected.

In a 2024 documentary, Commissioner Raymond Siu said that the SDU "conduct regular exchanges with other counter terrorism teams from around the world".

== Vehicles ==
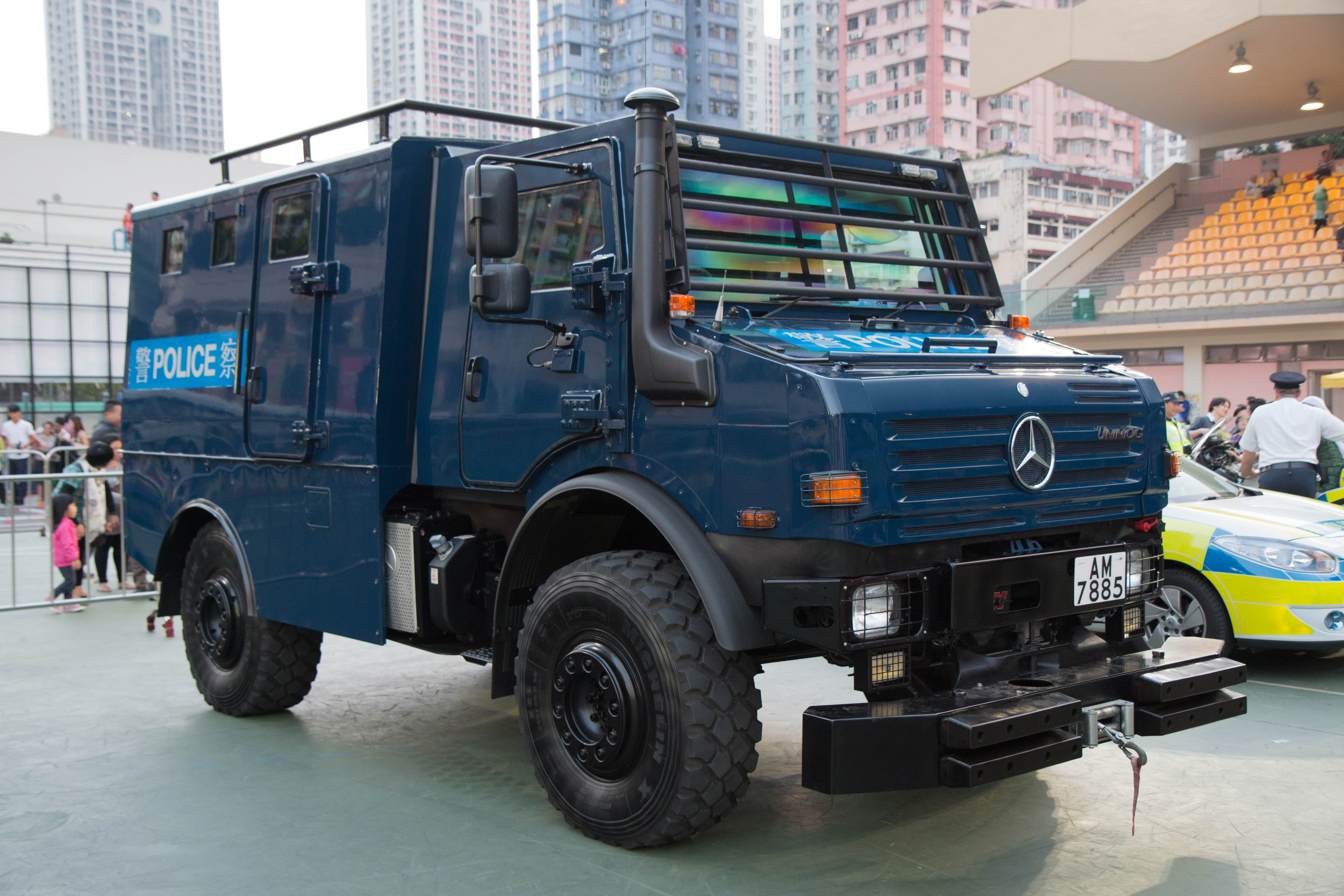
Mercedes-Benz Unimog armoured vehicle used by the SDU

The SDU has several ground vehicles including the Mercedes-Benz Unimog U5000 armoured personnel carrier, the Jankel Guardian Tactical Intervention Vehicle based on a Ford F-450 chassis, Mercedes-Benz Vario van and Man LE14.224 truck.

The SDU has two types of watercraft to support its maritime operations; the FB Design RIB 55 feet (17 m) high speed interceptor and Zodiac inflatables.

The Government Flying Service provides aviation support with Eurocopter AS332 Super Puma and Eurocopter EC155 helicopters.

== Equipment ==
SDU officers deploy in Crye Precision G3 combat dress of various camouflage patterns depending on the environment. Officers may also deploy in plain clothes during a rapid response when there is no time to change.

Armor and accessories include Ops-Core FAST ballistic helmets with attachable night-vision scopes and ear protection, MSA Advantage 1000 CBA-RCA respirators, and Dräger LAR V rebreathers (for tactical diving).

Unlike many similar units around the world, most of the SDU officers do not display the word "Police" on their uniforms.

=== Weapons ===
The SDU mainly uses firearms manufactured in the United States and Europe, and its latest equipment include but are not limited to:

Name	Country of origin	Type	Notes
Glock 17	Austria	Semi-automatic pistol	Standard issue
Glock 19	Austria	Semi-automatic pistol	Standard issue
Heckler & Koch MP5	Germany	Submachine gun	Standard issue
SIG Sauer SIG516	United States	Assault rifle	Standard issue
SIG Sauer MCX VIRTUS	United States	Assault rifle	Acquired in limited quantities before the arms embargo
Remington 870	United States	Shotgun	M870 MCS Breacher variant is also in used
Benelli M1 Super 90	Italy	Shotgun	Status unknown
Franchi SPAS-15	Italy	Shotgun	Status unknown
Remington 700	United States	Sniper rifle	Status unknown
KAC SR-25	United States	Sniper rifle	Current issue
Accuracy International AX308	United Kingdom	Sniper rifle	One of the standard sniper rifles since the 2010s
Accuracy International AS50	United Kingdom	Sniper rifle	Revealed in 2021
CS/LR4	China	Sniper rifle	Status unknown
QBU-203	China	Sniper rifle	One of the standard sniper rifles since 2024
SIG Sauer SSG 3000	Switzerland	Sniper rifle	Used in training.
Brügger & Thomet GL-06	Switzerland	Grenade launcher	Revealed in 2019, used in riot control
M320 Grenade Launcher Module	Germany	Grenade launcher	Revealed in 2019, used in riot control
ARWEN 37	United Kingdom	Grenade launcher	Revealed in 2019, used in riot control

== See also ==
- Counter Terrorism Response Unit
- Police Tactical Unit (Hong Kong Police Force)
- Airport Security Unit
- Special Tactical Squad
- Emergency Unit
