= Police Tactical Unit (Hong Kong) =

Unit within the Hong Kong Police Force

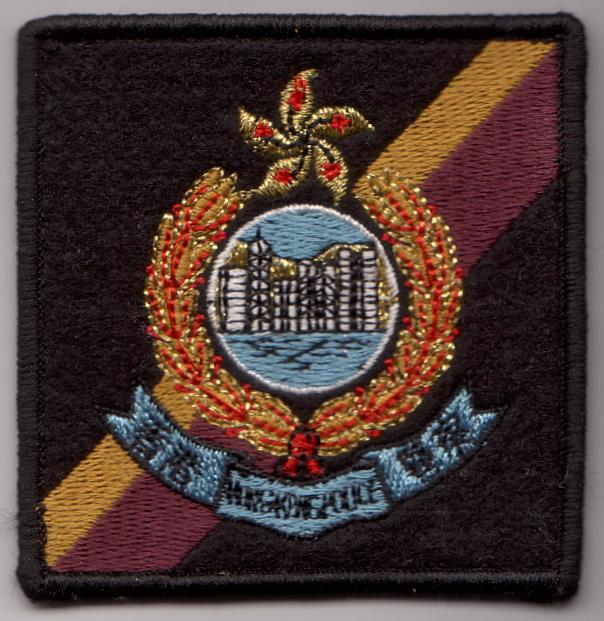
- PTU patch
- Active: 1958 - present
- Country: Hong Kong (1958-1997); Hong Kong (1997-Present); China
- Agency: Hong Kong Police Force
- Type: General Safety Control; Anti-crime
- Role: Internal security; Crowd control; Anti-crime operations; Disaster response; Riot control
- Part of: Operations Wing
- Headquarters: 1 Wu Tip Shan Road, Fanling
- Motto: Failing to plan is planning to fail
- Common name: Blue Berets
- Abbreviation: PTU

Structure
- Officers: ~2,000 regulars ~1,000 echelon

The Police Tactical Unit (PTU; Chinese: 警察機動部隊) is a unit within the Hong Kong Police Force which provides an immediate manpower reserve for use in large-scale emergencies. Unit companies are attached to all land Regions and are available for internal security, crowd control, anti-crime operations, disaster response and riot control throughout Hong Kong.

The PTU is the parent unit for the Special Tactical Contingent (STC), which specializes in riot control drawing members from other units including the PTU Headquarters and the Special Duties Unit (SDU) for temporary ad hoc tasks.

The PTU base and training camp is located in Fanling.

== History ==
The PTU was established in 1958, known then as the Police Tactical Contingent (PTC). The PTC's name changed to the PTU in 1968.

In 1969, the PTU was allowed to wear the beret as their standard headgear, which lead to the unit being known locally as the "Blue Berets".

According to a list of Refurbishment of Government Building projects released online by the Architectural Services Department, the PTU HQ's gymnasium, toilets and store room at Block M is proposed to be renovated for HK$5 to 10 million.

== Duties ==
The PTU is responsible for training HKPF officers stationed within the Emergency Unit.

== Organization ==
The PTU is made up of eleven companies, comprising in total about 2,000 officers. Each company (under the command of a Superintendent) is made up of 4 platoons, each led by an Inspector or Senior Inspector. A platoon comprises 32 Officers with 1 Station Sergeant (senior NCO) and 8 Sergeants.

The unit consists of the Training Division, Support Division and Research and Development Division.

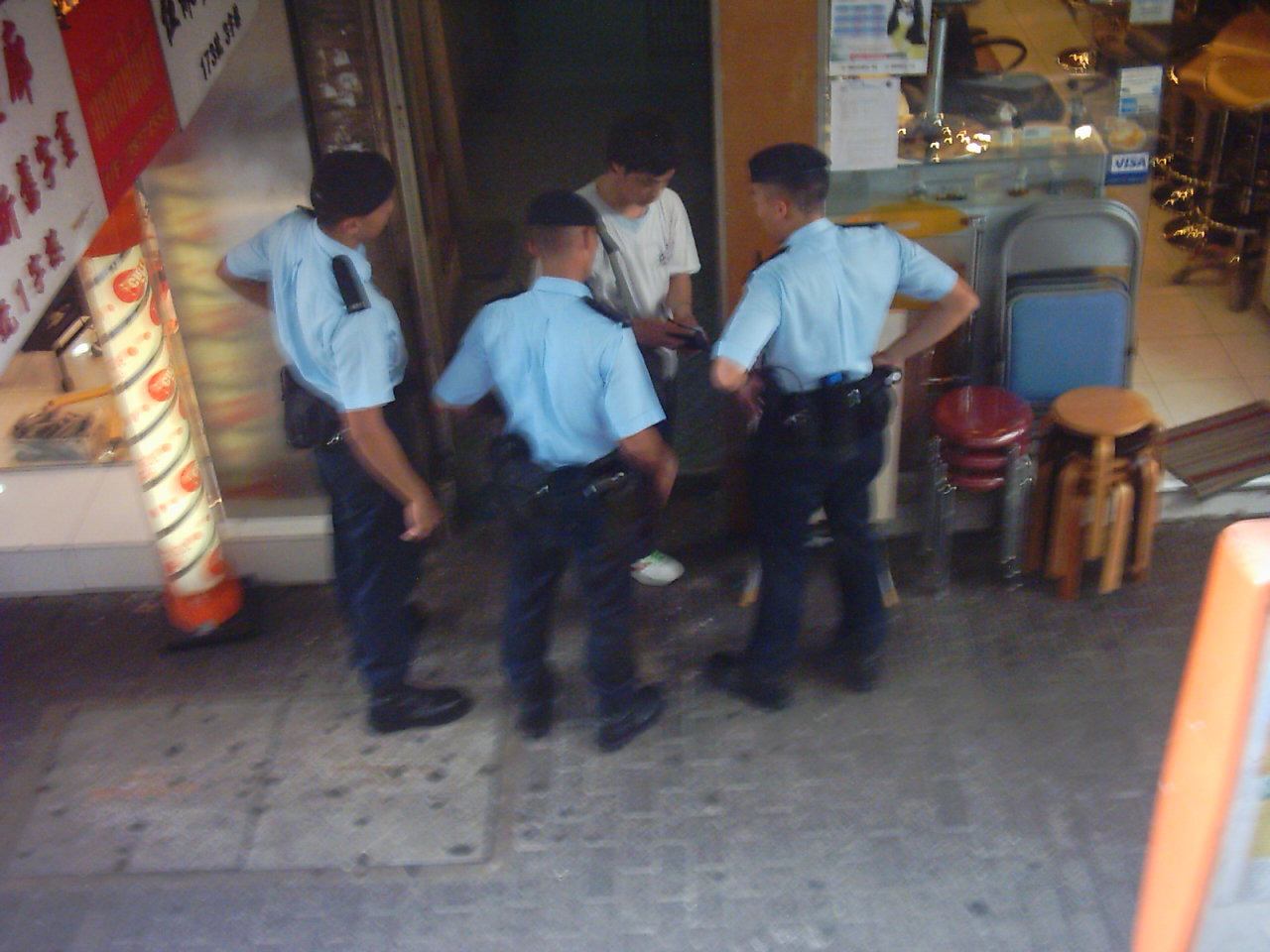
Police Tactical Unit officers stop to check a suspect.

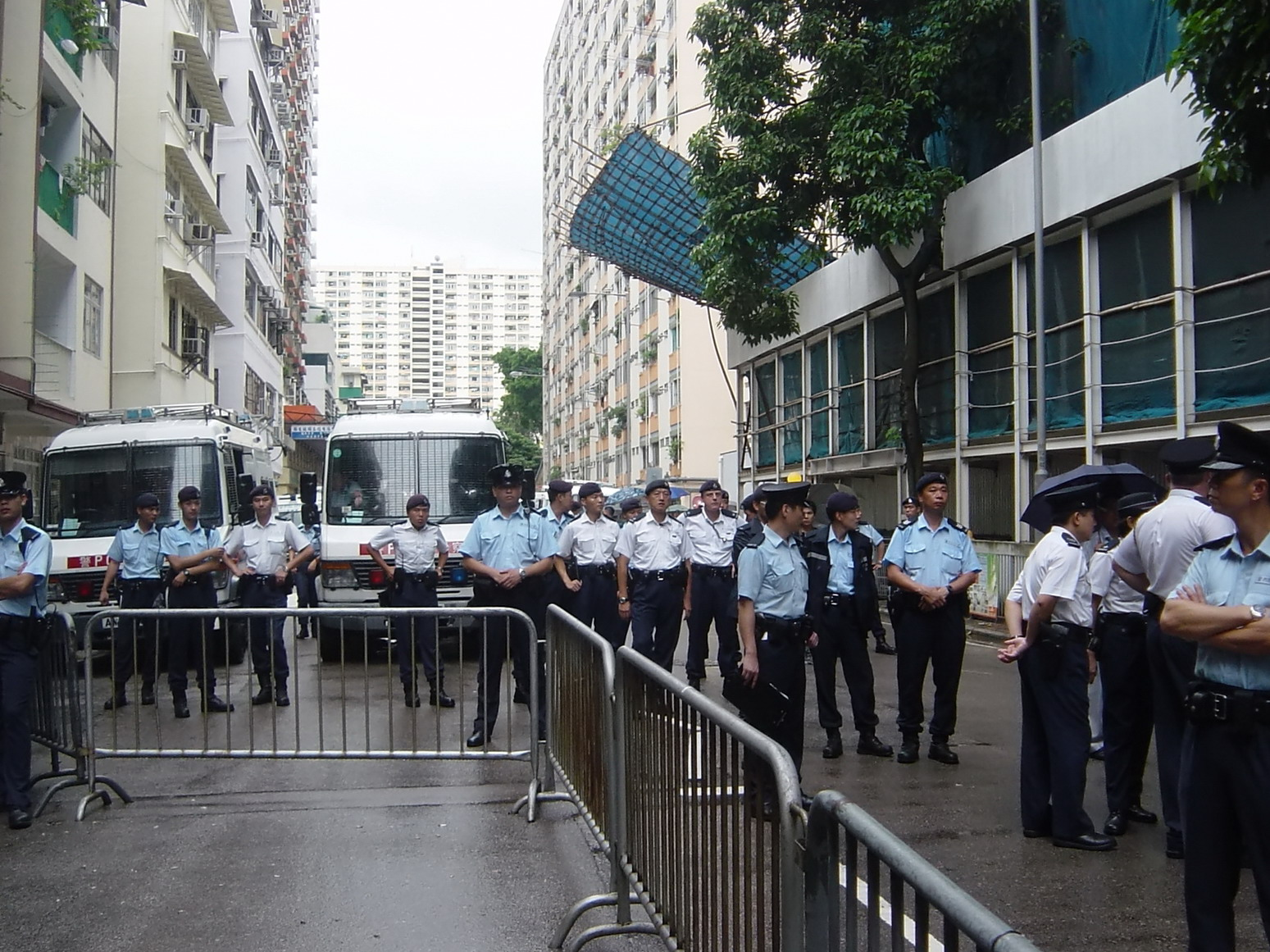
PTU officers on duty during Aug 2007 metalworkers' protests.

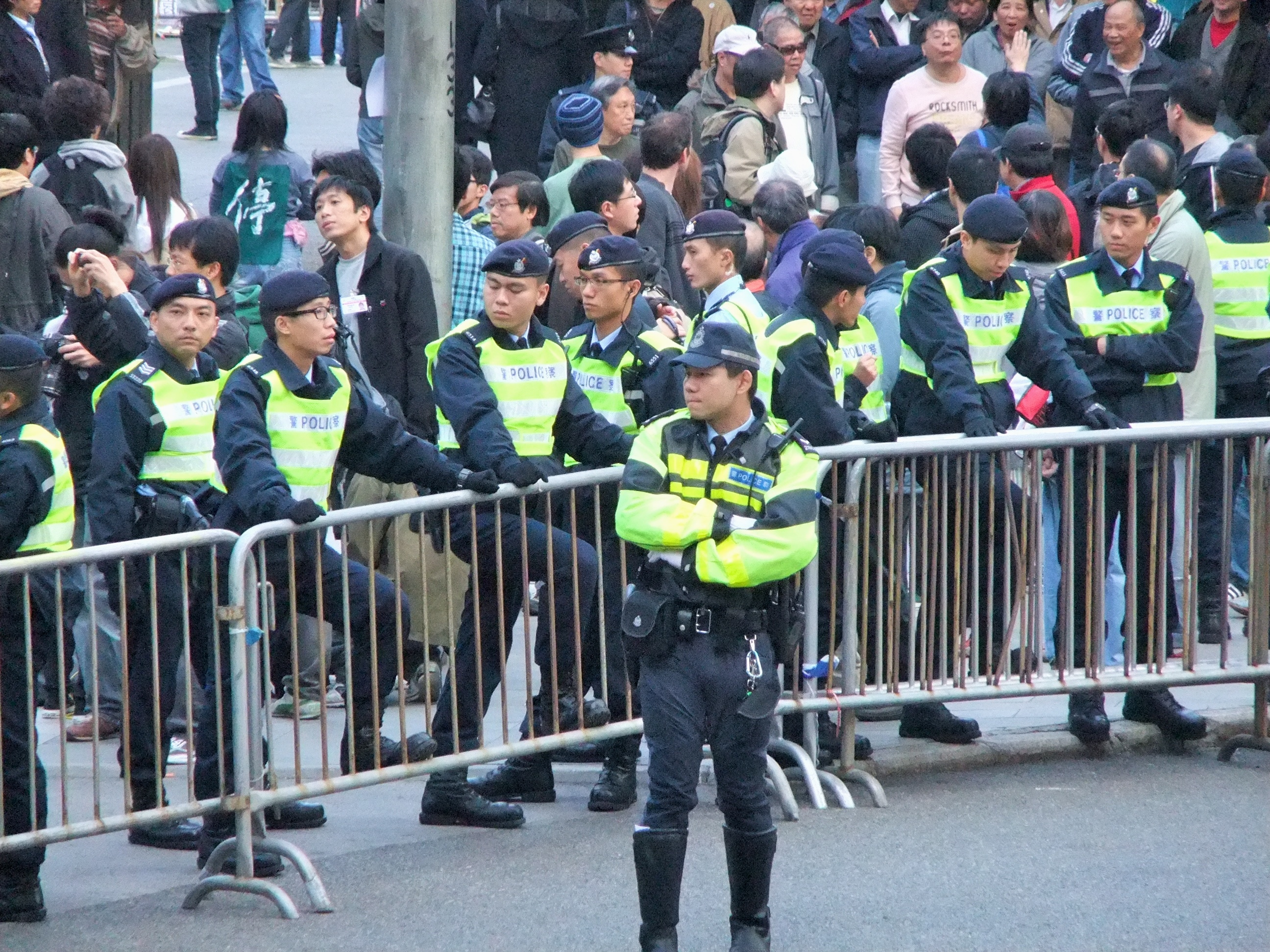
PTU officers stand guard behind a barricade.

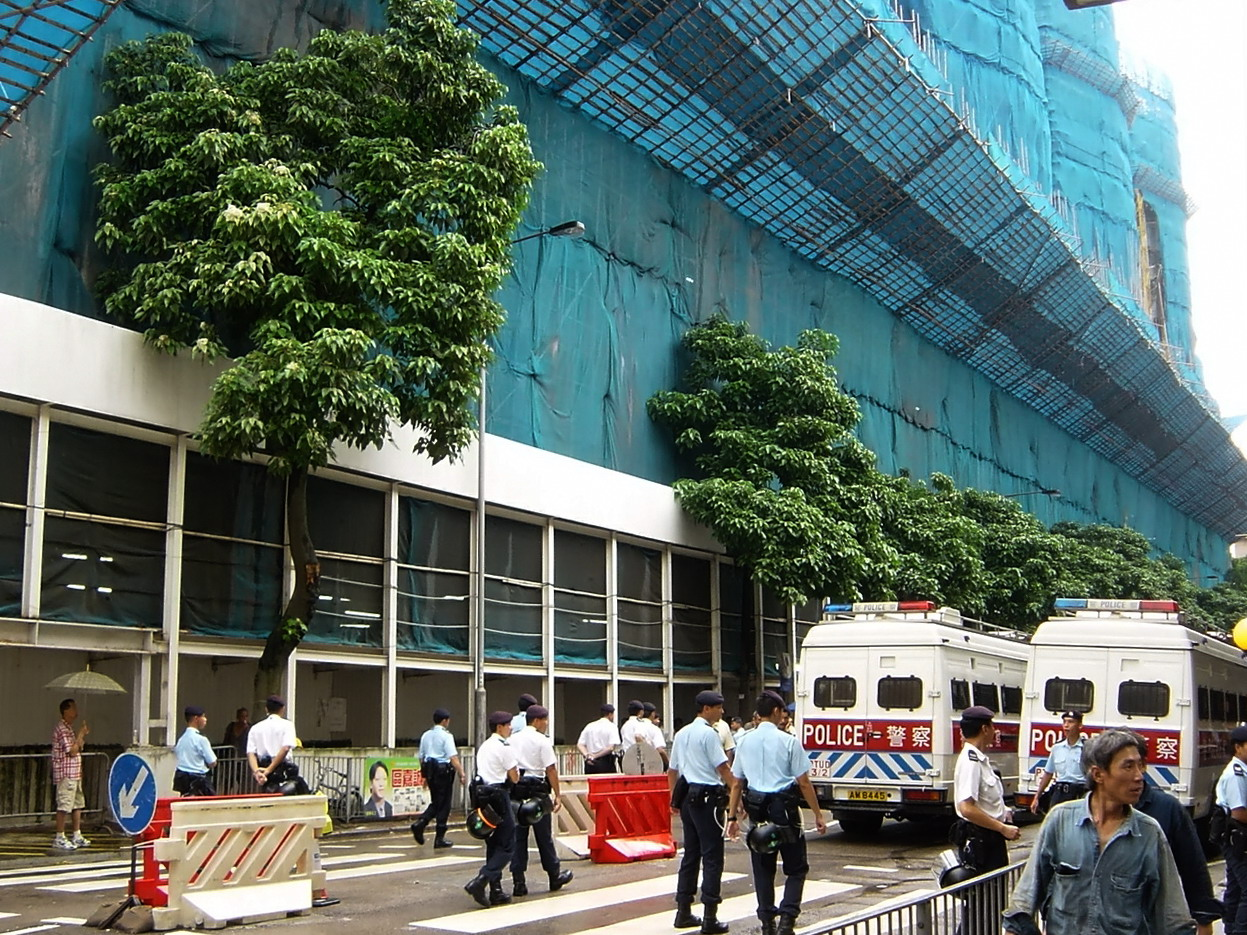
PTU officers on duty during Aug 2007 metalworkers' protests.

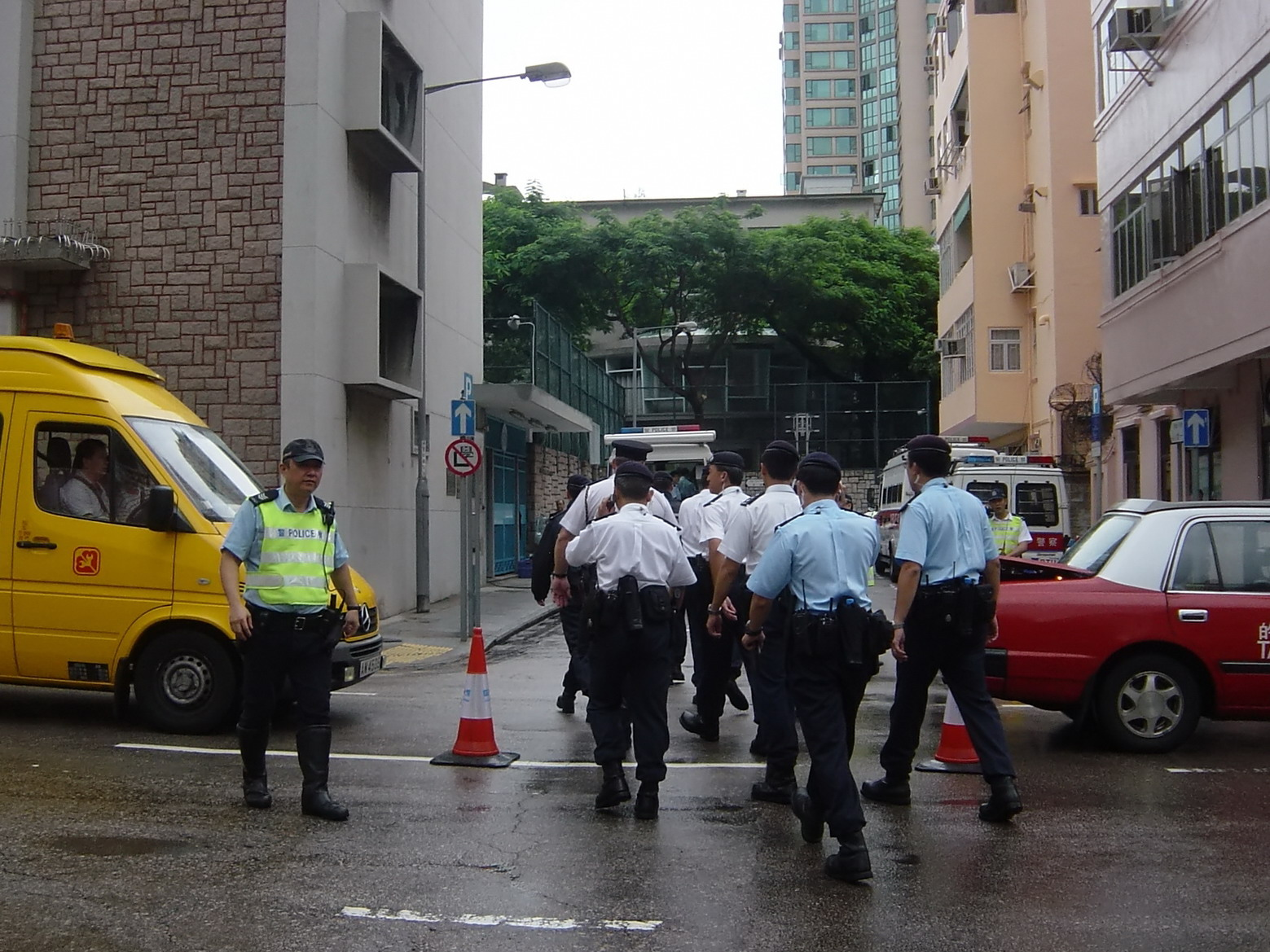
PTU officers cross a street toward police vans.

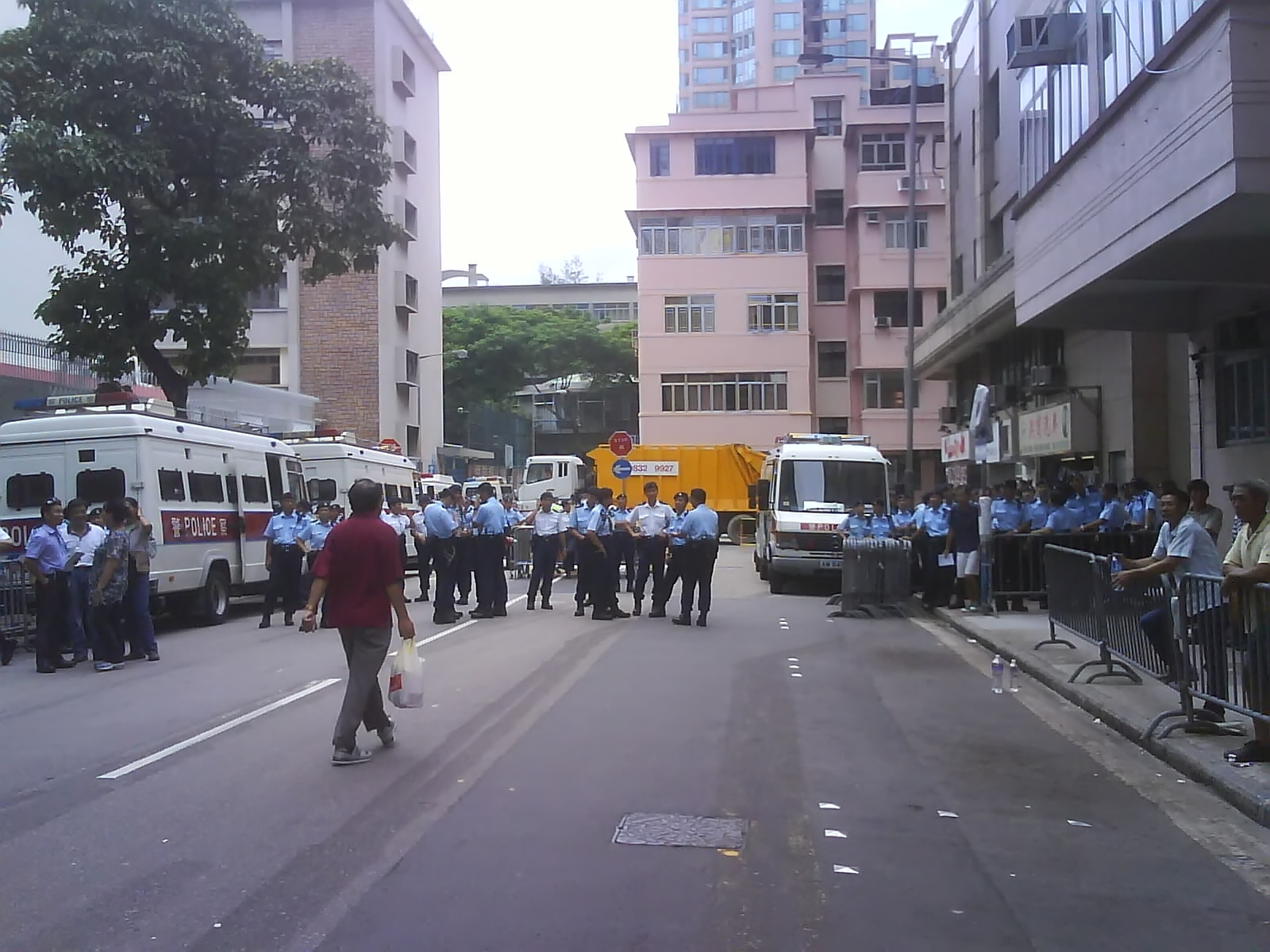
PTU operating at an intersection during Aug 2007 metalworkers' protests.

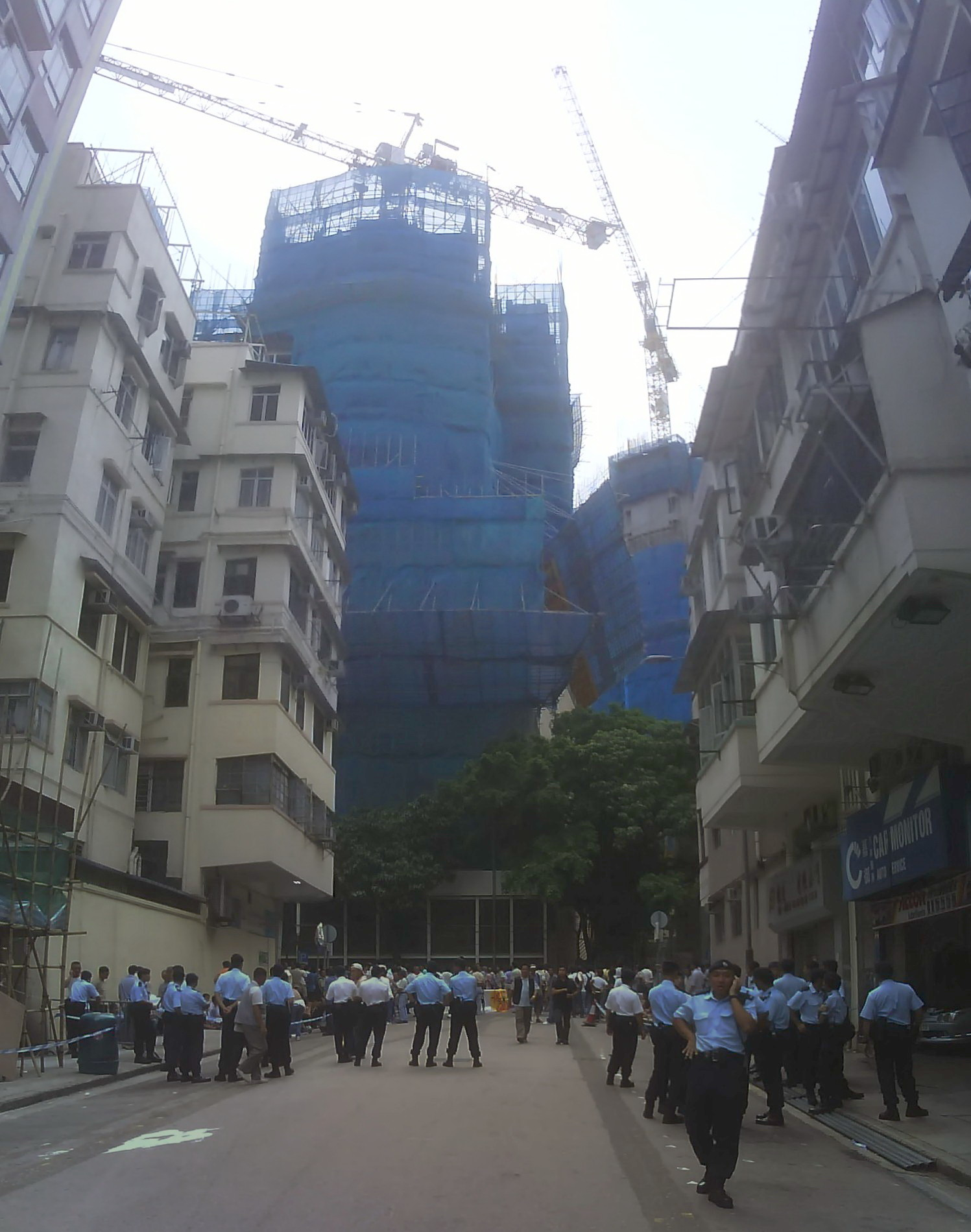
PTU operating during Aug 2007 metalworkers' protests.

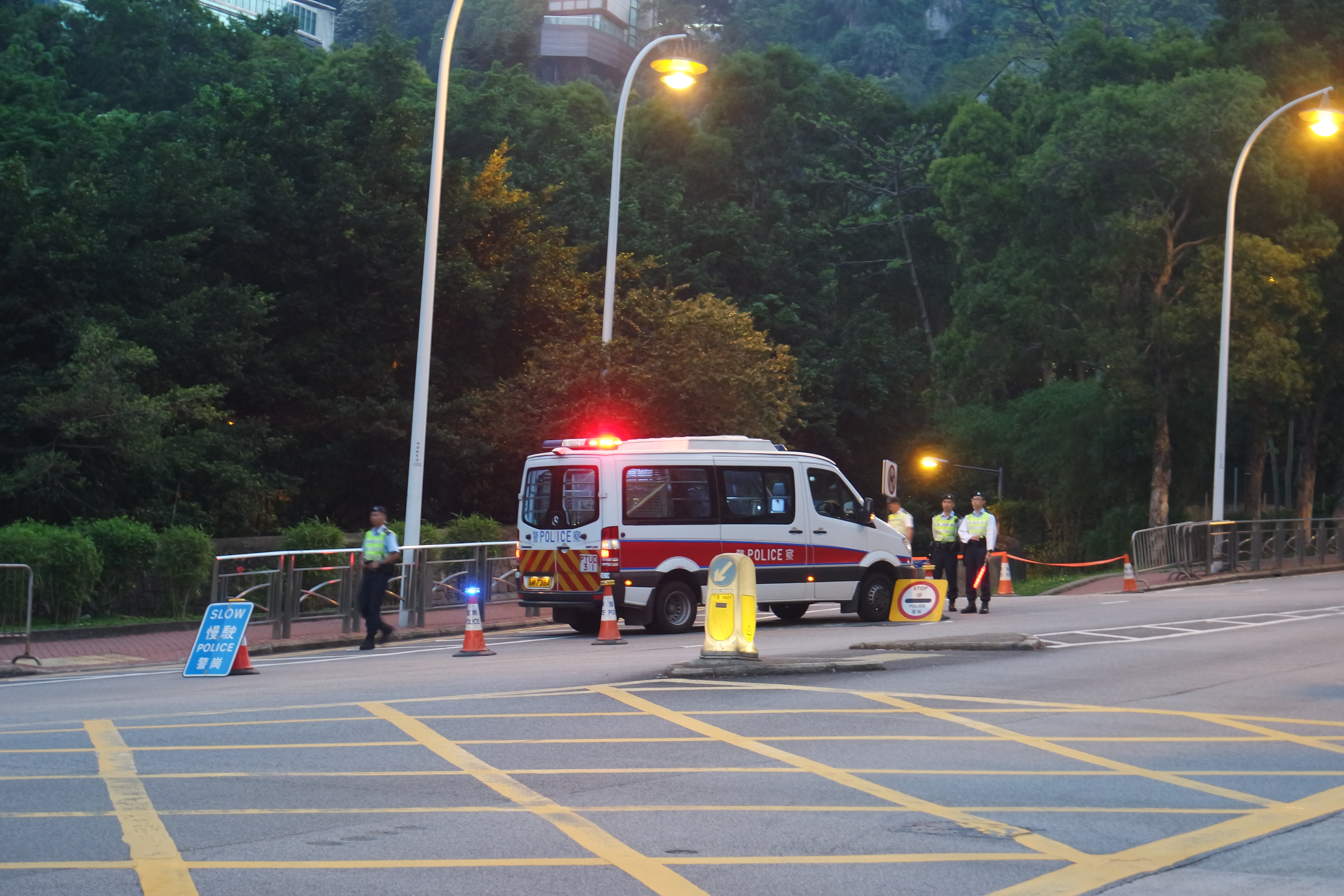
PTU officers deploying roadblock at Admiralty

== Vehicles ==
=== Current ===
- Toyota Coaster
- Mitsubishi Fuso Rosa
- Mercedes-Benz Atego
- Mercedes-Benz Sprinter
- Ford F550; made in China and named Sabertooth

=== Former ===
- Isuzu NPR
- Bedford TJ
- Toyota Dyna
- Saxon (vehicle)
- Alvis Saracen
- Mercedes-Benz Vario
- Mercedes-Benz Unimog U5000

== Equipment ==
=== Personal gear ===
- Baton
- Pepper spray
- S10 respirator
- Green Load Bearing Vest
- 5.11 Tactical Load Bearing Vest

=== Firearms ===
Name	Country of origin	Type	Notes
Smith & Wesson Model 10	United States	Revolver	Standard Issue
CF98A	PRC	Semi-automatic pistol	Issued since 2024
Remington 870	United States	Shotgun	Standard Issue
Colt AR-15	United States	Semi-automatic rifle	Standard Issue
Federal Model 201-Z Riot Gun	United States	Less lethal option	Standard Issue
Penn Arms GL-1 Compact	United States	Less lethal option	Revealed in 2019
Pepperball	United States	Less lethal option	VKS, FTC/Tippmann 98 and TCP variants in use
Byrna HD	South Africa	Less lethal option	Pepper projectile pistol
Piexon JPX4	Switzerland	Less lethal option	Pepper projectile pistol
QBZ-191	China	Assault rifle	Ceremonial use only

== In popular culture ==
- Tactical Unit (film series)
- On the First Beat

== See also ==
- Airport Security Unit (Hong Kong)
- Special Duties Unit
