= VIP Protection Unit (Hong Kong) =

Unit of the Hong Kong Police Force

- 要員保護組 (Chinese)
- Active: 1974; 52 years ago – Present
- Country: Hong Kong (1974-1997); China (1997-Present); Hong Kong
- Agency: Hong Kong Police Force
- Type: Protective security unit
- Operations jurisdiction: Hong Kong
- Part of: 'B' Department - Crime and Security Wings
- Common name: G4; VIPPU

Structure
- Officers: 100 (1997)

Commanders
- Current commander: Senior Superintendent Lu Shilong
- Notable commanders: Craig Foster

The VIP Protection Unit (Abbreviation: VIPPU; Chinese: 要員保護組), otherwise known as G4 (originally Section G, Division 4), is a protective security unit branch of the Hong Kong Police Force (HKPF).

== History ==
The unit was established in 1974 in the wake of tragic events that took place in the Munich Massacre in 1972. The original name had been given to the VIPPU since it is the 4th division of the former Royal Hong Kong Police Force's Special Branch (RHKPF Special Branch).

Following the disbanding of the RHKPF Special Branch in 1995, the VIPPU was reassigned under the Security Wing of the HKPF after the handover in 1997.

=== Known operations ===
In 1997, VIPPU was involved in protecting delegates attending the World Bank-IMF Meeting and the Hong Kong handover ceremony.

The VIPPU was involved in policing demonstrations at the 2008 Summer Olympics in Hong Kong.

In August 2012, the VIPPU was deployed to protect the crew of the Shenzhou 9 when they visited Hong Kong.

In January 2019, the unit protected Donald Tsang, who was the former Chief Executive after his release from prison.

On May 29, 2025, the VIPPU provided protection for Wang Yi and foreign VIPs in Hong Kong to attend a ceremony of the launching of the International Organization for Mediation.

== Organization ==
The VIPPU is currently under the HKPF's Crime and Security Department under the Security Wing. It is under the command of a HKPF officer with the rank of Senior Superintendent. Contact details for the VIPPU and the exact number of officers working in the unit are classified due to security concerns that require confidentiality.

The unit primary responsibility for the personal safety of HKSAR Chief Executive and his/her core family (previously, the Governor and his family before the handover in 1997), high-rank government officials, VIPs and visiting dignitaries to Hong Kong. They are also deployed to protect Chief Executive candidates during public events. For female VIPs, female VIPPU officers are deployed to protect them.

The VIPPU is also trained to conduct stealth-based protection in case the VIP wants them to keep a low profile. In case a VIP refuses VIPPU protection, they will assess the situation and increase police presence to ensure their safety.

=== Training ===
All prospective VIPPU officers are trained to counter sudden attacks, hostage rescue, VIP protection, and unarmed combat with English/Putonghua courses. They are also trained to provide Basic Trauma Life Support in case the VIP suffers wounds or injuries. The unit conducts joint exercises with the PTU, SDU and the ASU.

Basic training lasts for 10 weeks, followed by a probationary period for six months. Candidate are required to run with 50 kgs. sandbags to simulate carrying VIPs when under fire. Selection lasts for three days and two nights, which includes physical fitness, fighting and swimming exercises. In the VIP protection course, candidates are required to be trained in firearms, self-defense and first aid. For prospective candidates who qualify, but are deemed not to be physically fit under VIPPU standards are placed under the "Physical Fitness Enhancement Course".

All serving HKPF officers are qualified to attend training with Constable, NCO and Inspector ranks.

== Equipment ==
The VIPPU uses the Glock 17 and 19, the Remington Model 870 and the Heckler & Koch MP5K-PDW. They also used stun, smoke and flash grenades with batons. For protection, the unit has access to bulletproof blankets.

A BMW 7 Series F03 acquired by VIPPU in 2012 has a removable bulletproof windshield, armored tires and roof. Sensors are built in the vehicle to determine change in air composition with the windows/vents automatically closing in case of an incident involving WMDs, including toxic and biological.
