= Drug abuse in Hong Kong =

Legal drug abuse is the action of using drugs that are allowed by the government or not controlled by means of prescription to alter one's consciousness and emotions. The Hong Kong government has tolerate policy against legal drug use. Drugs such as cannabis and ecstasy, which can be considered recreational drugs in other countries are all illegal in Hong Kong.

Legal drug use remains high among adolescents in Hong Kong. This trend dropped in the mid-1990s, but reappeared in the beginning of the 21st century. The increase of consumption of illegal drugs among adolescents in Hong Kong can be attributed to the global trend of recreational drug use at nightclubs and rave parties. Following the popularisation of nightclubs and rave culture in Hong Kong, the abuse of party drugs such as ecstasy and ketamine has been on the rise since 2000.

Despite Hong Kong being a relatively safe city, and the Hong Kong government's efforts in controlling the use of illegal substances, drug abuse is still a prevailing issue in Hong Kong. Each year, more than 2000 people are reported to have taken illicit drugs for the first time. This can be attributed to Hong Kong's relatively lenient punishment for those found to have possessed illegal drugs and adolescent's receptive viewpoint regarding drug use as a normal part of leisure, as well as easy access of party drugs in club settings. Sometimes, the judge will only ask the offender to bind over or charge the offender with a fine after they are convicted.

== Popular illegal drugs in Hong Kong ==
The following substances listed, all considered illegal in Hong Kong, are in order of popularity:

- Ketamine- a general anaesthetic used in intensive care by doctors for its pain relieving and sedative qualities.
- Cannabis- Cannabis often referred to as marijuana, weed or pot is often used for its psychoactive and physiological effects.
- MDMA- also known as ecstasy, is a psychoactive drug that induces hallucinogenic properties. Ecstasy became popular in the mid-1990s because of its association with Western club culture and raves.
- Cocaine- a white powdery substance extracted from the leaves of the coca plant, and is considered the strongest natural stimulant.
- Methamphetamine- a strong central nervous system stimulant in the amphetamine class used to treat ADHD.
- Heroin- an opioid analgesic, derived from the opium poppy, a narcotic drug that is four times stronger than morphine.
- GHB- a central nervous system suppressant with anti-anxiety effects at lower doses. In higher doses, the sedative effects of GHB can induce sleep, which can potentially lead to a coma. GHB is also known as a date rape drug.

== Penalties ==
Illegal drug use in Hong Kong is regarded as a narcotics offence, and if caught penalties include imprisonment for seven years and a fine of HK$1,000,000. From the statistics of drug offences in 2015 released by The Secretary for Security, Lai Tung-Kwok, there are 1855 serious drug offences in total, 414 offences less compared to 2013. Nearly 450 young adults were arrested because of serious offences, such as possession and use of illegal drugs.

== Prevention ==
There is no sufficient evidence suggesting that behavioural intervention can prevent illegal drug use. To prevent people from taking drugs in Hong Kong, there are numerous agencies such as non-government organisations and anti-drug organisations funded by the government set up to help educate the general public about the dangers of substance abuse and to help people with substance abuse problems. The Narcotics Division launched anti-drug policies and measures providing programs to strengthen Hong Kong citizens awareness of hidden problems of drug abuse. It also set up a 24-hour hotline to provide services and professional social workers to give suggestions to those in need. The Caritas Youth and Community Service, and Play Safe Healthy Life Service strive to help adolescents with substance abuse problems through providing crisis intervention services and drug education.

== Recreational drug use ==
Recreational drug use is characterised by the use of drugs with psychoactive effects without medical justification for personal enjoyment. Recreational drug use in Hong Kong among young adults has been in the rise in recent decades, popularised by the introduction of club culture in the West and adolescents open-minded attitude towards illegal drug use as a normal part of leisure. The revival of this trend is connected to the change in drug abuse pattern of adolescents, mainly from party drugs such as ketamine and MDMA. The popularisation of party drugs in nightclubs and raves are due to its ability to elevate moods, promoting the dancing atmosphere and a sense of euphoria. Along with MDMA and ketamine, cannabis, cocaine and GHB is considered the more popular illegal drug of choice for adolescents. 78% of adolescents attending nightclubs chose ketamine and 66% would use MDMA, and less than 12% would use other drugs such as cannabis and methamphetamine.
