= Special Branch (Hong Kong) =

Royal Hong Kong Police intelligence unit

Special Branch 政治部
- Abbreviation: SB

Agency overview
- Formed: 1934
- Dissolved: 1 July 1995

Jurisdictional structure
- Operations jurisdiction: British Hong Kong
- General nature: Secret police

Operational structure
- Parent agency: Royal Hong Kong Police Force

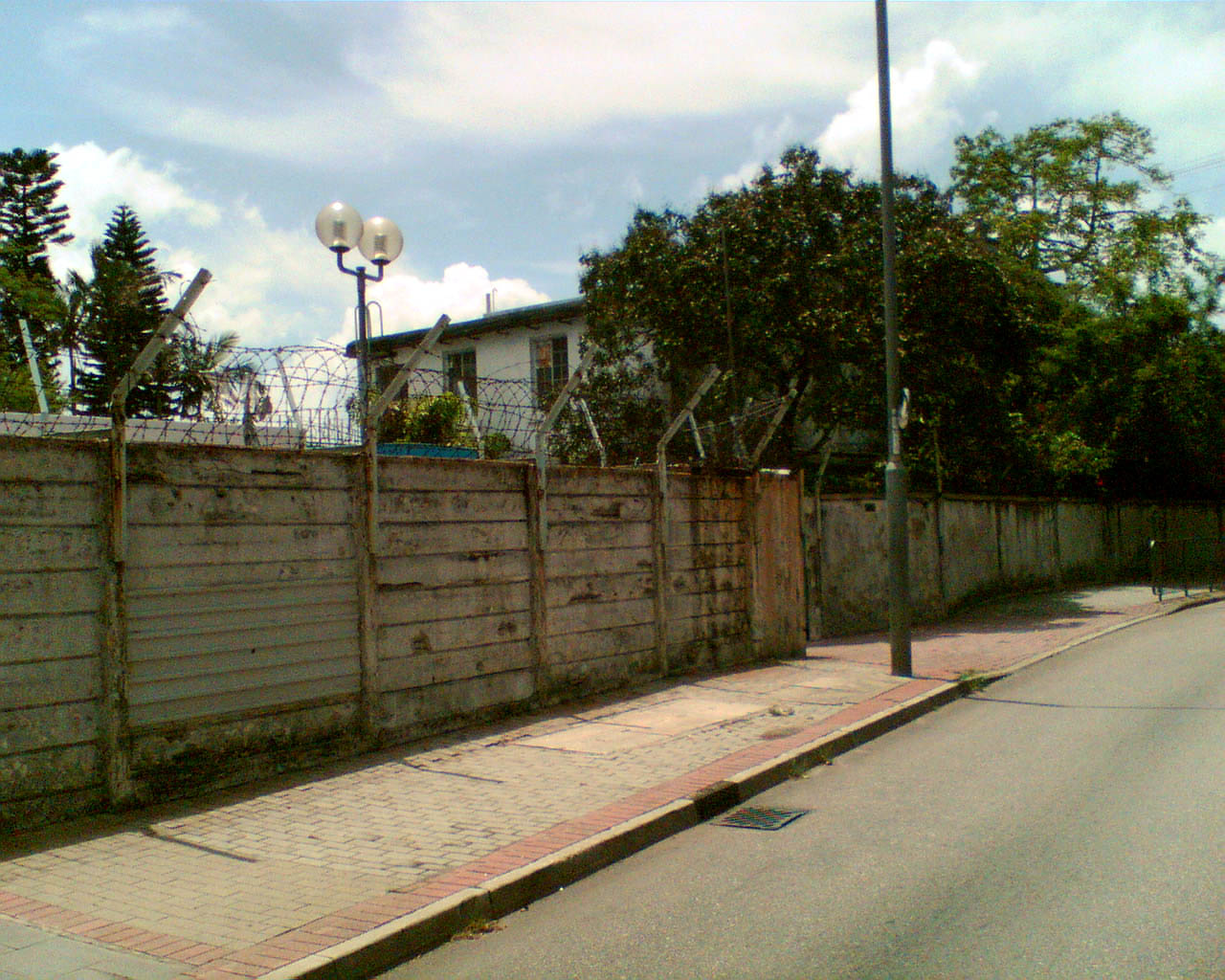
Victoria Road Detention Centre was used by the Special Branch

Special Branch (Chinese: 政治部; lit. 'Political Department'), abbreviated as SB, was established in 1934 under the Crime Department of the Royal Hong Kong Police Force. The SB was an intelligence/counter-intelligence unit in the RHKP. The Branch disbanded in 1995 in the final days of colonial period.

They used to be stationed at the Victoria Road Detention Centre prior to SB being disbanded, which was also used as a training site for potential SB officers.

== History ==
=== Early days ===
In the face of a perceived direct Communist threat to Hong Kong, an Anti-Communist Squad was established in the Criminal Investigation Department of the then colonial Hong Kong Police by 1930. It was named the Political Department in Chinese (政治部). In 1933 (some sources said 1934), the squad's English name became "Special Branch" while its Chinese name remained unchanged. The Branch was said to be under MI5 with assistance from MI6, and became part of the Hong Kong police in 1946, focusing on the prevention of pro-CCP leftists and pro-KMT rightists infiltrating Hong Kong.

In addition to anti-subversion operations, its role during its first two decades also included immigration, passport control and registration of persons. SB officers were taken to enforce the Registration of Societies Ordinance aimed at controlling triad gangs.

By 1949, then an elite division of the Criminal Investigation Division, Special Branch was manned by a large cohort of British officers brought in that year by Deputy Commissioner Peter Erwin, the Director Special Branch (DSB), to replace remnants of the prewar Shanghai Settlements police. Under DSB John Prendergast (later Sir John), appointed Deputy Commissioner in 1960 to lead the division, Special Branch was considered a highly professional security apparatus, pursuing anti-corruption and anti-Triad duties in addition to intelligence and counter-subversion operations. By 1977, the branch strength had reached almost a thousand.

SB officers assigned to work in Hong Kong were encouraged to work alongside MI6 agents in penetrating mainland China due to a lack of intelligence success with their Far East Controller.

In the 1960s, HKP SB officers utilised the Victoria Road Detention Centre, known as 'White House', and more colloquially as 'The Farm', to interrogate pro-communist agitators, and pro-KMT agents. Among the cases involving the SB included the arrest of Tsang Siu-fo, who was a superintendent in the RHKP for being a pro-communist agent.

By 1961, SB responsibilities to handle immigration and passports were handed over to the newly established British Hong Kong Immigration Department.

=== 1980s and 1990s ===
SB descriptions from 1983 did not mention its role of monitoring subversive activities due to the then ongoing Sino-British negotiations on returning Hong Kong back to China. In 1988, the SB stopped accepting new recruits.

The Branch provided help in Operation Yellowbird, rescuing student activists following the 1989 Tiananmen massacre.

As the handover of Hong Kong was approaching, the Intelligence Wing was gradually dismissed, with the officials being settled in the United Kingdom after signing life-long non-disclosure agreements. The division was disbanded in 1995, prior to the transfer of sovereignty over Hong Kong in 1997. Units of SB were reassigned under the Security Wing (Department B) – Crime and Security.

The Security Wing, on the other hand, was merged to the Crime and Security Department (CSD) on 1 July 1995, The CSD is now responsible for the VIP Protection Unit. It took charge for continuing the work of the SB. The Intelligence Wing was eliminated and all related information was deleted to prevent it from being transferred to Chinese hands, although some files were sent back to London. The RHKP Special Branch did not leave any record of their work, owing to their intelligence duties. Some of them were turned over to the Hong Kong SAR government after it was established.

In 2012, declassified documents showed that the RHKP Special Branch was infiltrated by the intelligence service of the government of the Republic of China during the Cold War.

== Organisation ==
The Branch was consisted of two Wings: Intelligence Wing and Security Wing, and led by the Deputy Commissioner of Police, Senior Assistant Commissioner of Police, Assistant Commissioner of Police, and a Chief Superintendent of Police. It was formerly based at the Victoria Road Detention Centre.

Eight divisions were established, handling political vetting, anti-terrorism, intelligence, espionage, bugging socialists in Hong Kong, and preventing spies from China.

In 1986, it was documented by Michael Ng-Quinn that 70% of officers who are of senior rank in the SB were made up of expat officers.

- Special Branch
  - Intelligence Wing
    - Intelligence Division: preventing the infiltration of communists, gathering intelligence over socialist states.
    - Support Division: providing technical support for counterintelligence, translation and intelligence analysis
  - Security Wing
    - Operations Division: monitoring communists across the globe and deal with subversions by CCP
    - Counterintelligence Division: monitoring communists in Hong Kong, vetting police and protecting VIPs in Hong Kong

== See also ==
- National Security Department
