= Airport Security Unit =

Unit of the Hong Kong Police Force

- 機場特警組
- Active: 14 November 1977 - present
- Country: Hong Kong (1977-1997); Hong Kong China
- Agency: Hong Kong Police Force
- Role: Airport police
- Operations jurisdiction: Hong Kong International Airport
- Headquarters: Chek Lap Kok Police station, 8 Catering Road West, Chek Lap Kok
- Abbreviation: ASU

Structure
- Officers: 130

Commanders
- Current commander: Chief Inspector Hung Yat Na

Website
- police.gov.hk

Airport Security Unit
- Traditional Chinese: 機場特警組
- Simplified Chinese: 机场特警组
- Literal meaning: Airport Special Police Group
Transcriptions
Standard Mandarin
- Hanyu Pinyin: Jīchǎng Tèjǐng Zǔ
Yue: Cantonese
- Yale Romanization: Gēi chèuhng dahk gíng jóu
- Jyutping: Gei1 coeng4 dak6 ging2 zou2

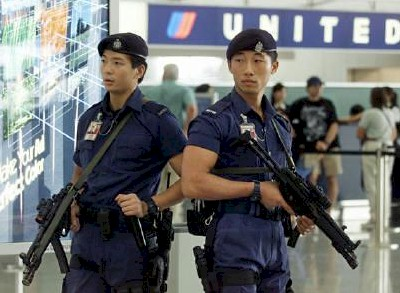
Airport Security Unit officers on duty.

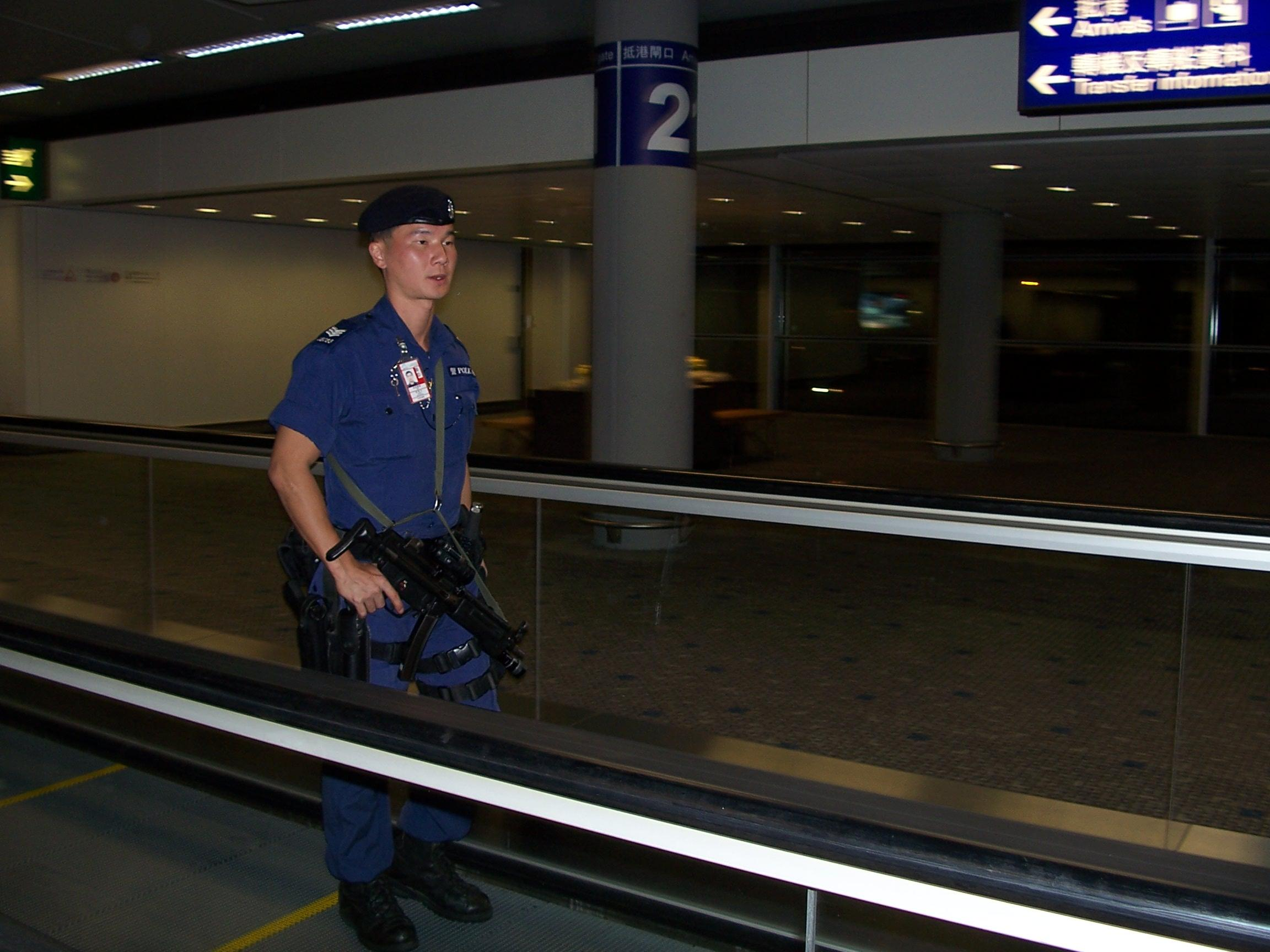
Airport Security Unit officer on patrol with an MP5.

The Airport Security Unit (ASU; Chinese: 機場特警組) is the airport police of the Hong Kong Police Force (HKPF) tasked with the security of the Hong Kong International Airport. ASU officers can be identified by their distinctive deep blue uniform and are armed with sub machine guns as well as semi-automatic pistols. They also have different patches.

== History ==
The ASU was originally formed in 1977 as the Special Action Squad on standby for security at Kai Tak Airport. In 1978, following a review it was renamed as the Airport Security Unit and commenced patrolling the airport.

In 1998, the ASU moved to the Chek Lap Kok Airport. Prior to the airport being opened to the public, the unit conducted anti-terrorist exercises in the facility.

The unit recruited the first woman, who joined in 2003. In May 2003, the ASU started to train in a new training facility, the Airport Security Unit FX Training Range, created by Cathay Pacific and the Hong Kong Aircraft Engineering Company at the Chek Lap Kok Police Station.

== Duties ==
ASU is responsible for airport security at primarily targeting terrorist situations such as aircraft hijacking and sabotage. In urgent situations, is used as a backup force for situations outside of the airport. The unit is also responsible for supporting the capture of criminals attempting to flee the country via Hong Kong International Airport, including supporting the protection of VIPs traveling to the Hong Kong International Airport.

== Training ==
Applicants for the ASU need to complete a two phase selection course the first phase is a one-day fitness test and the second phase is over four days and then complete a ten-week training course.

The ASU has a training range for firing simunition with corridors, rooms and check-in counters to simulate the airport terminal and also a mock-up of an aircraft interior to simulate a plane.

== Weapons ==
| Name | Country of origin | Type | Notes |
|---|---|---|---|
| Browning Hi-Power | Belgium | Semi-automatic pistol | Used from 1977 to 2001 |
| Glock 17 | Austria | Semi-automatic pistol | Standard issue sidearm |
| Sterling SMG | United Kingdom | Submachine gun | Retired from service |
| Heckler & Koch MP5 | Germany | Submachine gun | Standard issue SMG deployed in A3 and RAS variants |
| CS/LS7 | China | Submachine gun | |
| Colt AR15 | United States | Semi-automatic rifle | Retired from service |
| KAC SR-16 M4 | United States | Assault rifle | Standard issue rifle of ASU |
| Remington 870 | United States | Shotgun | |
| Benelli M1 | Italy | Shotgun | Status unknown |
| Heckler & Koch PSG1 | Germany | Sniper rifle | Status unknown |
| Remington Model 700 | United States | Sniper rifle | Status unknown |

== In popular culture ==
Compared to other units, the Airport Security Unit rarely appeared in the mass media, and there has yet to be any movie or television dedicated to them. However, the Unit was featured occasionally as part of films typically of the Cantonese-action genre:

Film

- Fatal Termination (1990)
- Knock Off (1998)
- Purple Storm (1999)
- Gen-Y Cops (2000)
- 2000 AD (2000)
- Connected (2008)
- New Police Story movies
- Rush Hour movies

Television

- Sergeant Tabloid (2012)

== See also ==
- Police Tactical Unit (Hong Kong)
- Special Duties Unit
- Special Tactical Squad
