= Hong Kong new year marches =

Political marches in Hong Kong

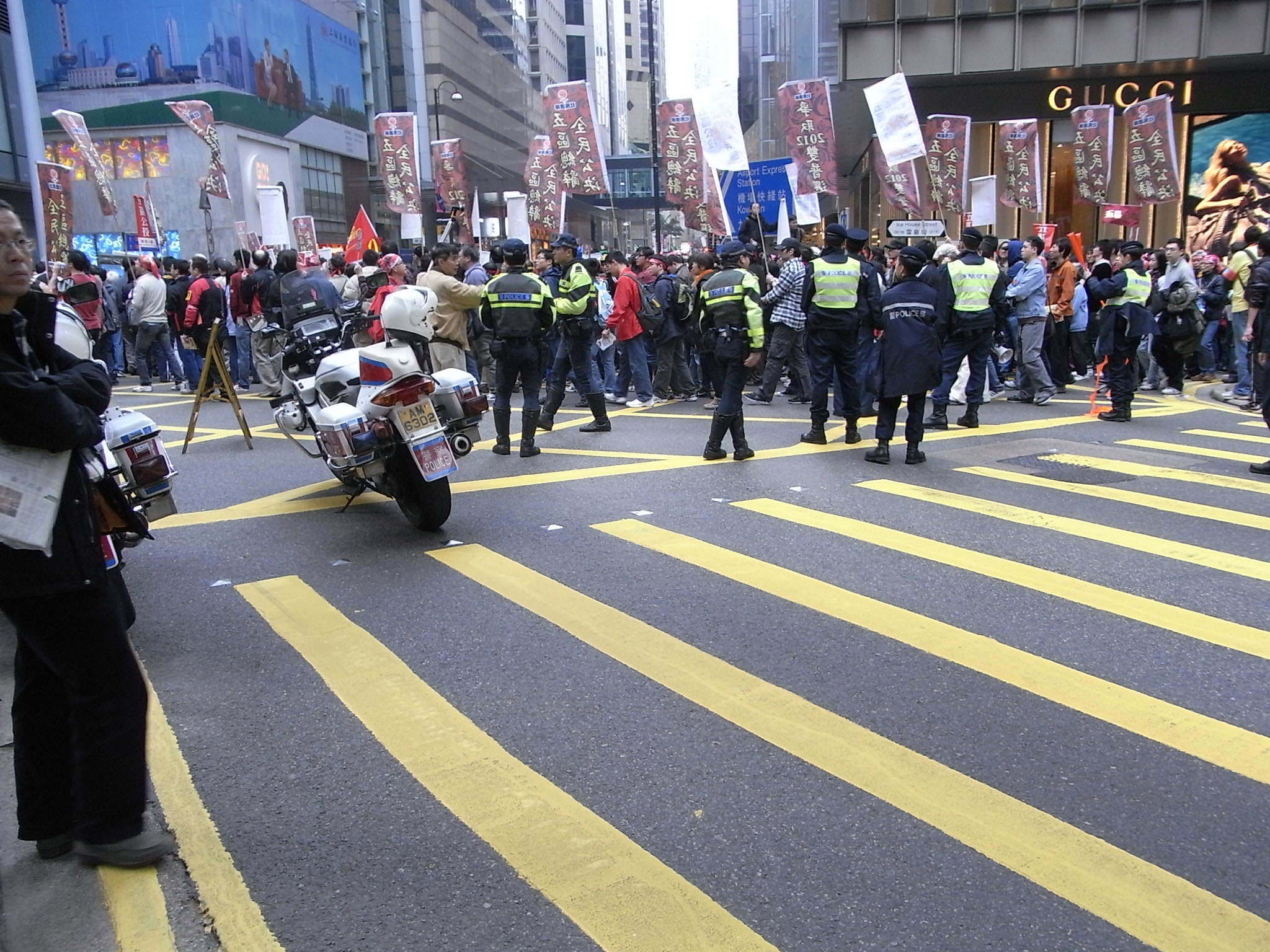
Protest on 1 January 2010

The New Year marches (Chinese: 元旦大遊行) were a fixture on the political calendar in Hong Kong. Thousands took to the streets demanding universal suffrage as part of the ongoing democratic development as well as to protest against further influence of mainland China in Hong Kong. Lead organiser for marches was the Civil Human Rights Front (CHRF). The Front disbanded in August 2021, following accusations by police in April that it was suspected of operating illegally due to not having been registered as organisation; its last remaining spokesperson Figo Chan had been jailed in May in relation to the 2019–2020 Hong Kong protests.

== 2010 march ==
In a 2009 directive from Beijing, the Hong Kong government said direct elections for the chief executive would come in 2017, and the legislature would not be fully elected until 2020. Five pro-democracy camp legislators planned to resign en masse from Legislative Council of Hong Kong. In December 2009, HK launched a proposal to increase the election committee seats for the chief executive from 800 to 1,200 individuals. On 1 January 2010, protesters called for the release of Chinese activist Liu Xiaobo, drafter of Charter 08, who had been sentenced to 11 years in prison just a month earlier. The protest also came four days after Donald Tsang, Hong Kong's chief executive, was given a warning by China’s leadership to resolve deep-rooted conflicts.

Police security was put up around the Beijing liaison office in HK. Layers of railings and human chains were set up protecting the building, and more than 1,000 police officers were deployed. About 10 activists, mostly supporters of the League of Social Democrats, broke through a cordon and stormed into the liaison office. Des Voeux Road was forced to close for an hour. Two police officers and one protester was injured. The protesters did not leave until 7:45pm when league members were allowed to lay a mock coffin at the building's back entrance.

=== Attendance ===
A mix reporting of different statistics on the number of people who participated. March organizers said more than 10,000 protesters turned out. Police put the number at 4,000. Pro-democracy camp said they attracted more than the expected 30,000 people. Other sources also suggest 30,000 protesters in participation with 9,000 reported by the police.

== 2013 march ==
Up to 130,000 people have held rival marches on 1 January 2013 in Hong Kong both for and against the city's chief executive CY Leung. Those protesting against him said he should step down over allegations he lied about illegal renovations and extensions to his mansion. Leung secretly extended his $64 million home without getting government planning permission or paying real estate fees. He is accused of lying about it during last year's election campaign. In response, Leung immediately erected a false wall to block access to the unauthorised extension, before awaiting official investigation. Leung claimed he had solved the problem as the illegal extension "did not exist anymore", but the action led to suspicion of destroying evidence. Leung had also been widely accused of hypocrisy over the issue, as he won the election on 1 July last year by criticising his opponent, Henry Tang for the unauthorised building of a huge basement for a villa held in the name of his wife. Other reasons included universal suffrage, greater democracy, the widening wealth gap and Beijing's meddling in Hong Kong affairs. Organisers of the march calling for Leung's impeachment estimated their numbers at 130,000, although police put the figure at a lower 26,000 at the march's peak.

Supporters of Leung who organised a follow-up march argued that he was beginning to address deep-rooted social issues. They also suggested that democracy is a Western concept, which is not compatible with fast economic development or Chinese culture. Supportive rally organisers reported that over 60,000 turned out, although police again reported a lower figure of 8,000.

== 2018 march ==
The march was organized by the Civic Human Rights Front. More than 10 pro-democracy groups and the camp's co-location concern group joined the march, as well as four disqualified lawmakers and Occupy movement leader Benny Tai Yiu-ting. The marchers protested seven social issues, including the West Kowloon co-location arrangement, the recent amendments to the Legislative Council's rules of procedure and the potential enactment of Basic Law Article 23. Organizers said 10,000 joined the march, while police said the turnout was 6,000.

== 2019 march ==
Approximately 5,500 protesters joined the rally, or 3,200 according to the police. They were joined by about 100 pro-independence activists including Wayne Chan and Baggio Leung, as well as Nathan Law and Joshua Wong of Demosisto. The organizer, the Civil Human Rights Front, had refused to comply with a request by authorities to stop people from carrying pro-independence banners outside government headquarters.

== See also ==
- Hong Kong 1 July marches
