= Sing Pao Daily News =

Hong Kong Chinese newspaper

- Type: Daily newspaper
- Format: Print, online
- Owner: Gu Zhuoheng
- Founded: 1939
- Political alignment: Pro-Beijing Leftist, but anti-LOCPG, anti-CY Leung and anti-Carrie Lam
- Website: www.singpao.com.hk

Sing Pao Daily News (Chinese: 成報) is one of the oldest Chinese newspapers in Hong Kong, first published on 1 May 1939 by the Sing Pao Newspaper Company Limited (成報報刊有限公司) under Ho Man-fat. It was initially published every three days, later becoming a daily.

By the 1950s, Sing Pao accounted for almost half of the market.

In 2003, the paper had a circulation of 100,000, reaching over 220,000 readers, the company says.

== Sections ==
Sing Pao consists of various sections:

- Local – This section contains Hong Kong headlines, an editorial column, local news and related softnews, as well as a complaints board.
- International (including PRC and Taiwan) – This section consists of international news, news from China, amusing international softnews, and profiles of international leaders.
- Economics – In this section, one can find Economic headlines, news on Chinese Business, finance information, investment tips, and information on the property market.
- Entertainment – In this section, there is wide coverage of local and international entertainment news.
- Sports – This section focuses on football news, including football-gambling, NBA, and other news.
- Horse-racing
- Supplementary sections, including Holiday, Foods and Drinks, Cars, Mobile phones, Computers and Software, Fashion and Beauty, Health, and Education.

Sing Pao especially targets teenagers and it has many school subscriptions. It has an editorial section for students, where young readers can summit their essays. The Teacher and Student Corner covers education in Hong Kong, ranging from kindergarten to tertiary institutions.

The paper includes Weekly International News Highlights and a Corner about the Hong Kong Legislative Council, giving a quick overview of current affairs and offering a space for readers to express their views.

== Improvement in technology ==
Sing Pao's PDA Channel allows download the latest news (including politics, current affairs, international affairs, entertainment, and even horse-racing information) from the official Sing Pao website.

== Financial problems and ownership ==
In 2000, amid declining sales, founder Ho Man-fat sold Sing Pao to Optima Media Holding (the purchaser was also stated as StarEastNet Limited (東魅網) and China Strategic Holdings Limited (中策集團)) for HK$150 million. In 2004, that company was itself bought and renamed Strategic Media International. At the time of the sale, it was announced that the reporting style would remain the same, but the main focus would shift to entertainment news and advertising. Chief executive officer Ng-Ching is targeting the Chinese market to expand its advertising revenue.

The newspaper was in financial troubles again in early 2006, during which it was unable to pay employee salaries on time. Eventually, in May 2004, twenty-three of its reporters – led by Kwok Yin-Ling (?) (郭燕玲), the assistant chief editor – took sick leave together as a measure/protest against the management. However, no agreement could be reached and the reporters ultimately resigned. Some top-level executives (and board members?) resigned after this incident. As of June 2006, at least 60 employees have left Sing Pao, the Mandatory Provident Fund Schemes Authority is suing Sing Pao because of all the MPF Sing Pao has not paid, and the Labour Department is suing Sing Pao because of the unpaid wages.

The Labour Department won and on 3 January 2007, Sing Pao was fined HK$4200. The media and the head of the Labour Department criticised the punishment as being too light. In face of the criticism, the magistrate reopened the case on his own initiative the next day, as authorised by law (Chapter 227, Section 104(5)). With the Magistrates' Courts, there is no functus officio: a magistrate can reopen his own case within 14 days. This led to other people criticising the magistrate's decision to reopen, saying it gives the impression of popular and executive interference in the judiciary.

In April 2015, the paper faced further difficulties, as creditor Korchina Culture filed a 'statutory demand notice' leading Sing Pao to seek a loan of HK$110 million. Amid the troubles, the paper ceased publication for several weeks from 17 July, and on 12 August the High Court ruled that the paper's indebted parent company, Sing Pao Media Enterprises, must be liquidated. With this move, the paper's immediate future was secure and publication continued.

== Criticism ==
On 4 February 2003, a reader complained to the Hong Kong Journalists Association (HKJA) that Sing Pao published the full name, address and picture of a victim in their paper, which violated their personal privacy.

Near the end of the 2012 Hong Kong Chief Executive election, Johnny Lau Yui-siu (劉銳紹), a pundit who wrote a critique of both Henry Tang and Leung Chun-ying for the Sing Pao Daily News, complained that the journal of "unfairly editing and distorting his column", turning his article into one favouring Leung. Lau said that his intended piece was entitled "Neither Tang nor Leung is worthy of support". In the piece, he opined that "supporting either party would not be conducive to the situation", but the published version read: "If there is really a need to make a choice, then, let's choose Mr Leung Chun-ying." Lau alleged that his conclusion was similarly distorted: "neither Mr Tang nor Mr Leung is worthy of support. They do not deserve sympathy either" was changed to read: "Mr Tang is not worthy of support. Nor does he deserve sympathy." Ngai Kai-kwong, editor-in-chief of Sing Pao said: "the editing might have been too carelessly done." He denied the paper had exercised censorship, nor that it had come under pressure from the central government's liaison office. Citing format and budget reasons, Sing Pao dropped Lau's column alone in April. However, the HKJA rejected this explanation, and suggested that the cause was Lau's mourning of a deceased Chinese dissident Fang Lizhi in his column, which triggered a blockage of access to Sing Pao's online version in mainland.

== See also ==
- Media in Hong Kong
- Newspapers of Hong Kong
