= 2011 Hong Kong Election Committee Subsector elections =

2011 Election Committee subsector elections
- 11 December 2011

1,044 (of the 1,200) seats in the Election Committee 601 seats needed for a majority
- Registered: 249,450 ▲13.23%
- Turnout: 65,565 (27.60%) ▲0.17pp
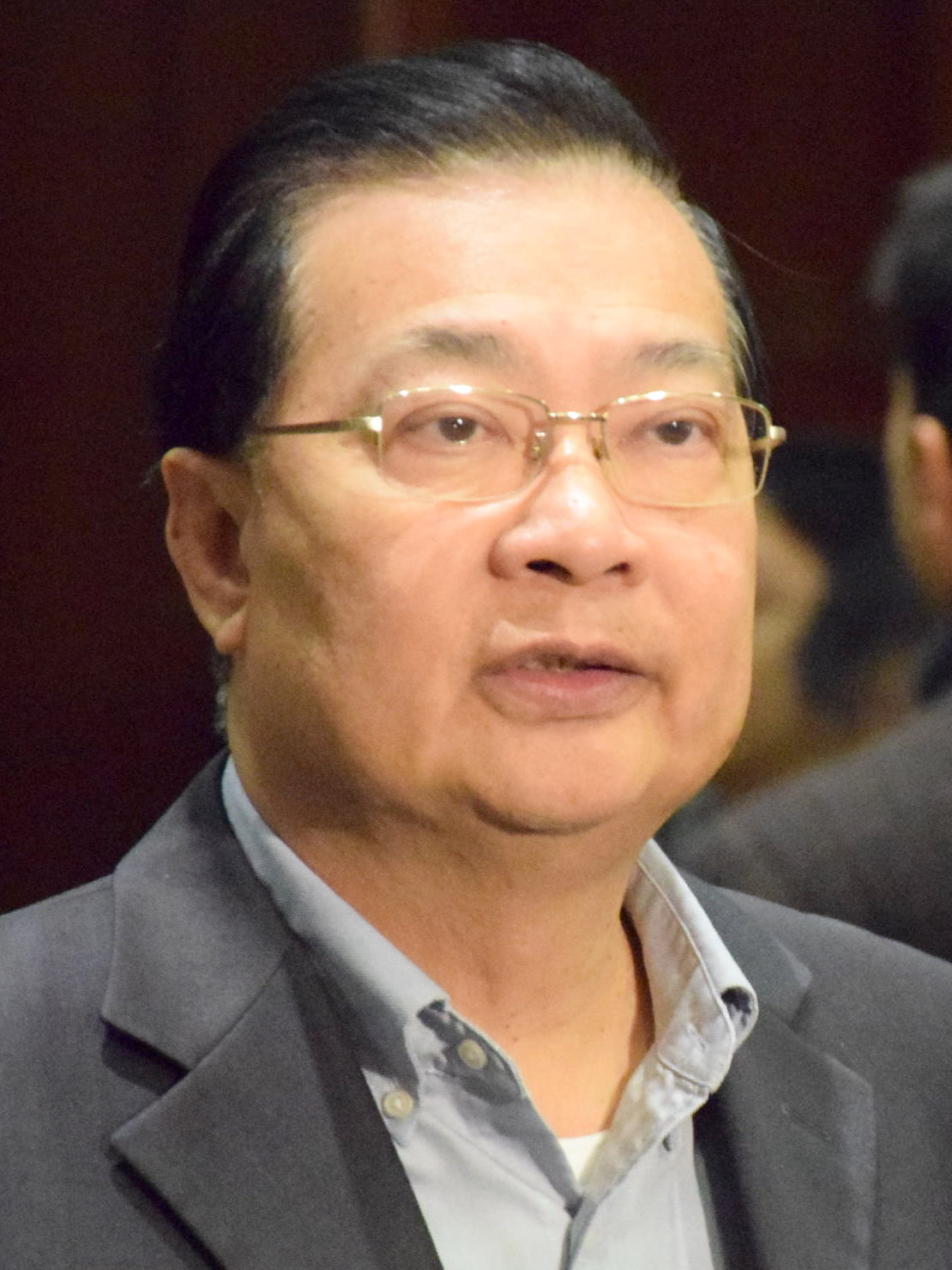

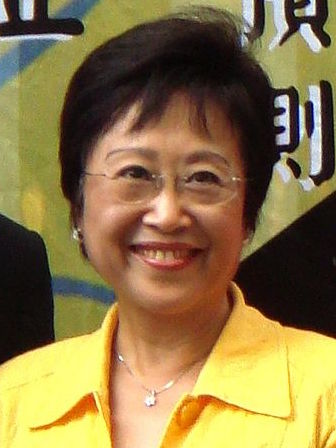

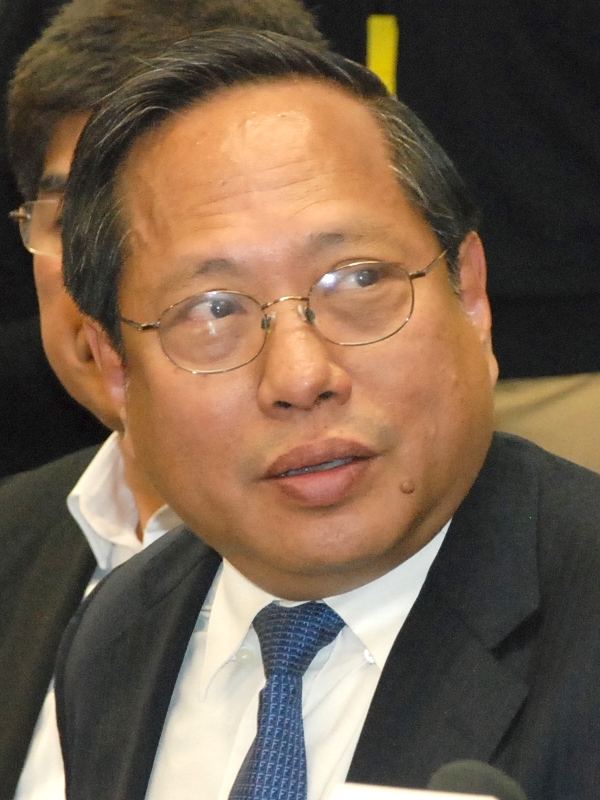

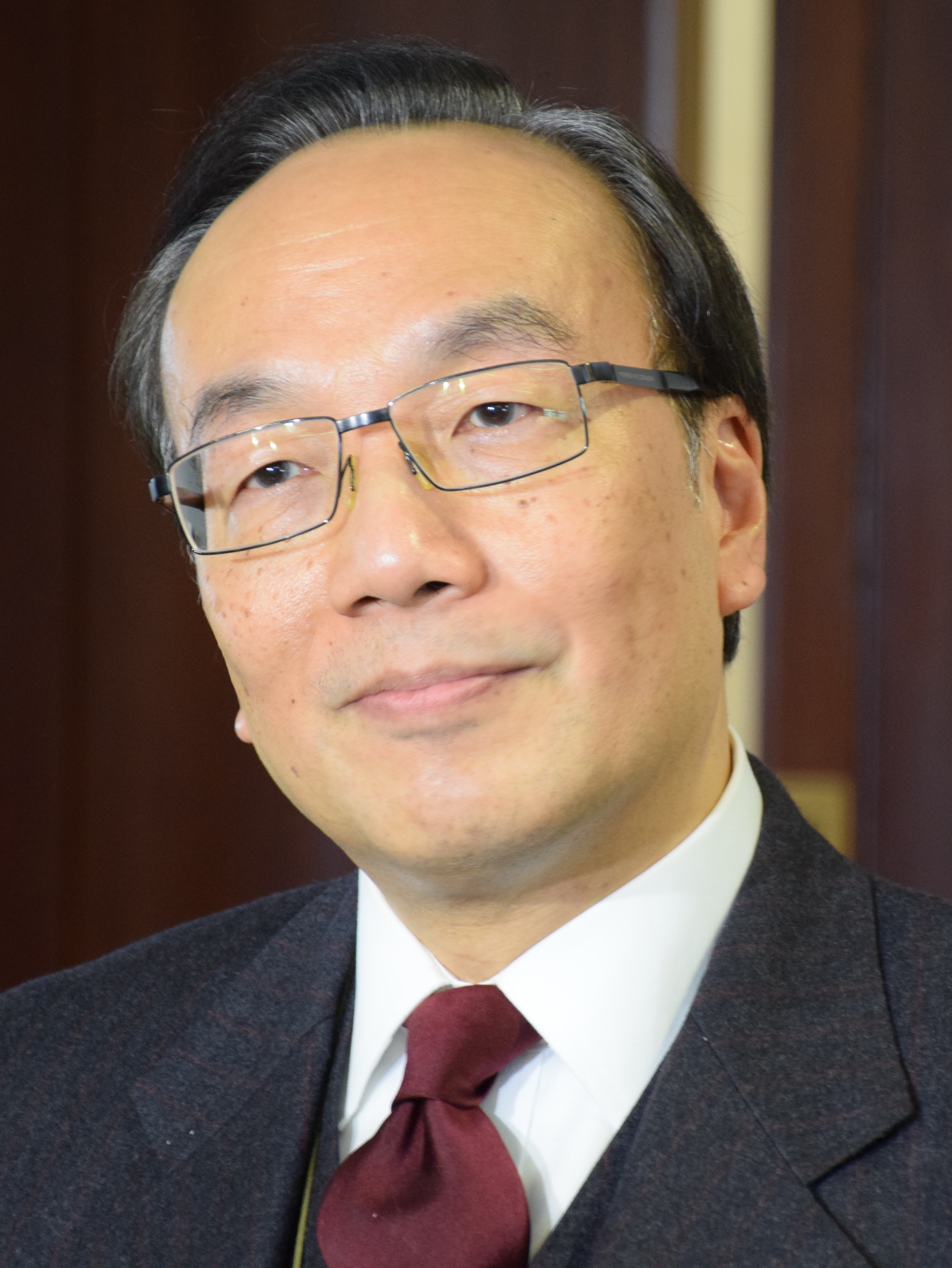
	First party	Second party
Leader	Tam Yiu-chung	Miriam Lau
Party	DAB	Liberal
Alliance	Pro-Beijing camp	Pro-democracy camp (Hong Kong)
Seats won	78	19
	Third party	Fourth party
Leader	Albert Ho	Alan Leong
Party	Democratic	Civic
Alliance	Pan-democracy camp	Pan-democracy camp
Seats won	14	13

The 2011 Election Committee subsector elections took place between 7:30 am and 10:30 pm on 11 December 2011. The Election Committee sub-sector elections are a part of the contemporary political process of Hong Kong. The election's purpose is to decide the 1,044 members of the Election Committee of Hong Kong. The resulting Election Committee is then responsible for electing the Chief Executive of Hong Kong Special Administrative Region (SAR) in the 2012 Election.

== Background ==
The breakthrough of the electoral reform in 2010 changed the membership of the Election Committee for the first time which expanded the size of the Election Committee from 800 members to 1,200 members. Each sector were allocated 100 more seats proportionally and the 10 Special Members were elected to fill the vacancy of the 10 new ex officio members Legislative Council which was also expanded from 60 to 70 seats in the electoral reform but was to be elected in the following September election. The Special Members were 4 in the Chinese People's Political Consultative Conference sub-sector and 2 in the Heung Yee Kuk, the Hong Kong and Kowloon District Councils, and the New Territories District Councils respectively.

== Composition ==
The Election Committee consisted of 1,044 [1,034] members elected from 35 subsectors, 60 members nominated by the Religious sub-sector and 96 [106] ex officio members. (Hong Kong deputies from the National People's Congress and Legislative Council of Hong Kong members). As the term of office commenced on 1 February 2012, the 1,200 member Election Committee was formed by 38 Election Committee Sub-sectors:

1. Heung Yee Kuk (28) [26]
2. Agriculture and Fisheries (60)
3. Insurance (18)
4. Transport (18)
5. Education (30)
6. Legal (30)
7. Accountancy (30)
8. Medical (30)
9. Health Services (30)
10. Engineering (30)
11. Architectural, Surveying and Planning (30)
12. Labour (60)
13. Social Welfare (60)
14. Real Estate and Construction (18)
15. Tourism (18)
16. Commercial (First) (18)
17. Commercial (Second) (18)
18. Industrial (First) (18)
19. Industrial (Second) (18)
20. Finance (18)
21. Financial Services (18)
22. Sports, Performing Arts, Culture and Publication (60)
23. Import and Export (18)
24. Textiles and Garment (18)
25. Wholesale and Retail (18)
26. Information Technology (30)
27. Higher Education (30)
28. Hotel (17)
29. Catering (17)
30. Chinese Medicine (30)
31. Chinese People's Political Consultative Conference (55) [51]
32. Employers' Federation of HK (16)
33. HK and Kowloon District Councils (59) [57]
34. New Territories District Councils (62)
35. HK Chinese Enterprises Association (16)
36. National People's Congress (36)
37. Legislative Council (60) [70]
38. Religious (60)

Note: Figures in brackets denotes the number of members and figures in square brackets denotes the number of members commencing in October 2012.

Number of members nominated by the six designated bodies of the religious sub-sector:

- Catholic Diocese of Hong Kong (10 members)
- Chinese Muslim Cultural and Fraternal Association (10 members)
- Hong Kong Christian Council (10 members)
- The Hong Kong Taoist Association (10 members)
- The Confucian Academy (10 members)
- The Hong Kong Buddhist Association (10 members)

== Nominations ==
The nomination period for the elections was between 8 and 15 November 2011 (The Hong Kong and Kowloon District Councils, and the New Territories District Councils Sub-sectors had a nomination period between 18 and 24 November 2011).

== Forums ==
Two candidate forums were arranged for all candidates and each forum was divided into two sessions. Candidates numbered 1–21 attended the first session on 23 October 2011, whilst candidates numbered 22–42 attended the second session on 20 and 23 October 2011.

== Election results ==
=== Results by subsectors ===
Statistics are generated from the official election website:

Sector	Sub-sector	Registered voters	Candidates	Elected	Votes	Turnout
I	Catering	7,895	34	17	1,126	14.26
I	Commercial (First)	817	21	18	454	55.57
I	Commercial (Second)	1,783	18	18	uncontested	
I	Employers' Federation of Hong Kong	122	16	16	uncontested	
I	Finance	125	18	18	uncontested	
I	Financial Services	539	29	18	372	69.02
I	Hong Kong Chinese Enterprises Association	321	16	16	uncontested	
I	Hotel	99	19	17	75	75.76
I	Import and Export	1,434	18	18	uncontested	
I	Industrial (First)	610	18	18	uncontested	
I	Industrial (Second)	695	18	18	uncontested	
I	Insurance	121	19	18	90	74.38
I	Real Estate and Construction	754	18	18	uncontested	
I	Textiles and Garment	3,188	18	18	uncontested	
I	Tourism	1,063	25	18	616	57.95
I	Transport	196	21	18	157	80.10
I	Wholesale and Retail	6,733	23	18	1,960	29.11
I	Sub-total for First Sector	26,828	349	300	4,850	27.77
II	Accountancy	24,630	65	30	7,617	30.93
II	Architectural, Surveying and Planning	6,778	78	30	2,746	40.51
II	Chinese Medicine	5,864	71	30	2,273	38.76
II	Education	86,618	65	30	20,084	23.19
II	Engineering	9,052	49	30	3,856	42.60
II	Health Services	39,128	67	30	5,784	14.78
II	Higher Education	9,106	46	30	2,829	31.07
II	Information Technology	5,522	61	30	2,264	41.15
II	Legal	6,583	66	30	2,329	35.38
II	Medical	11,118	83	30	3,787	34.06
II	Sub-total for Second Sector	204,399	651	300	53,569	26.21
III	Agriculture and Fisheries	159	60	60	uncontested	
III	Labour	591	78	60	432	73.10
III	Religious	N/A	60	60	no election	
III	Social Welfare	14,415	164	60	6,100	42.32
III	Sports, Performing Arts, Culture and Publication	2,358	60	60	uncontested	
III	Sub-total for Third Sector	17,523	422	300	6,532	43.53
IV	National People's Congress	N/A	36	36	ex officio	
IV	Legislative Council	N/A	60	60	ex officio	
IV	Chinese People's Political Consultative Conference	141	55	55	99	70.21
IV	Heung Yee Kuk	147	30	28	130	88.44
IV	Hong Kong and Kowloon District Councils	200	65	59	188	94.00
IV	New Territories District Councils	212	66	62	197	92.92
IV	Sub-total for Fourth Sector	700	312	300	614	87.71
	TOTAL	249,450	1,734	1,200	65,565	27.60

=== Result by affiliations ===
The election results are generated from the official election website. The political affiliations are according to the candidate's self-proclaimed affiliations shown on the election platforms, as well as from the news. (Note: Note 1: Candidates who are members of political party but do not state in their platforms may not be shown in this table, for example Elizabeth Quat in the Information Technology Subsector election who did not state her Democratic Alliance for the Betterment and Progress of Hong Kong membership is not counted as DAB candidate in this table.)

Summary of the 11 December 2011 Election Committee Subsector election results
Affiliation	1st Sector		2nd Sector		3rd Sector		4th Sector		Total	
Affiliation	Standing	Elected	Standing	Elected	Standing	Elected	Standing	Elected	Standing	Elected
Democratic Alliance for the Betterment and Progress of Hong Kong	12	10	2	2	9	5	61	61	84	78
Liberal Party	14	13	2	1	–		5	5	21	19
A16 Alliance	–		16	15	–		–		16	15
ICT Energy	–		24	8	–		–		24	8
Federation of Hong Kong and Kowloon Labour Unions	–		–		10	8	–		10	8
Hong Kong Federation of Trade Unions	2	1	–		2	2	3	3	7	6
Civil Force	–		–		–		5	5	5	5
New Territories Association of Societies	–		–		–		4	4	4	4
Education Convergence	–		6	3	–		–		6	3
New People's Party	–		1	1	–		2	2	3	3
Action 9	–		9	2	–		–		9	2
Your Vote Counts	–		6	2	–		–		6	2
Y5 Give Me Five	–		5	2	–		–		5	2
Hong Kong Federation of Education Workers	–		3	1	–		–		3	1
Government Disciplined Services General Union	–		–		2	1	–		2	1
Hong Kong Women Teachers' Organisation	–		2	1	–		–		2	1
New Century Forum	1	1	–		–		–		1	1
Welfare Empower Hong Kong	–		–		23	0	–		23	0
Vox Pop	–		12	0	–		–		12	0
Estimated pro-Beijing individuals and others	317	275	386	131	245	165	130	124	1,078	695
Total for pro-Beijing camp	346	300	484	177	281	173	210	204	1,321	854
Demo-Social 60 (Note: Note 2: Democratic Party's candidate in this group will be counted as the Demo-Social 60 members in this table as they state in their election platforms.)	–		–		31	29	–		31	29
Hong Kong Social Workers' General Union	–		–		29	28	–		29	28
ProDem22	–		22	22	–		–		22	22
IT Voice 2012 (Note: Note 3: The group had total of 20 candidates in total but one of them, Sin Chung-kai, is counted as Democratic Party's candidate in this table as he states in his election platform.)	–		19	19	–		–		19	19
Hong Kong Professional Teachers' Union (Note: Note 4: The group had total of 25 candidates in total but 7 of them are counted as Democratic Party's candidates and one is counted as Civic Party's candidate in this table as they state in their election platforms.)	–		17	17	–		–		17	17
Democratic Party	–		18	14	–		5	0	23	14
Civic Party	–		14	13	–		1	0	15	13
Academics In Support of Democracy (Note: Note 5: The group had total of 24 candidates in total but 11 of them are counted as their party's candidates in this table as they state in their election platforms.)	–		13	13	–		–		13	13
Democratic Accountants	–		9	9	–		–		9	9
Progressive Social Work	–		–		8	2	–		8	2
Hong Kong Association for Democracy and People's Livelihood	–		2	2	–		–		2	2
Neo Democrats	–		2	2	–		–		2	2
Engineers for Universal Suffrage (Note: Note 6: The group had total of 8 candidates in total but two of them are counted as Civic Party's candidate in this table as they state in their election platforms.)	–		6	1	–		–		6	1
Hong Kong Chinese Medicine Practitioners' Rights General Union	–		11	0	–		–		11	0
Pro-democratic individuals and others	3	0	2	2	–		–		5	2
Total for pro-democracy camp	3	0	135	114	68	59	6	0	212	173
Hong Kong Medical Association	–		30	15	–		–		30	15
Public Surgeons' United	–		8	2	–		–		8	2
Hong Kong Public Doctors' Association	–		4	0	–		–		4	0
Hong Kong and Kowloon Trades Union Council	–		–		3	0	–		3	0
Total (turnout 27.60%)	349	300	651	300	362	240	216	204	1,578	1,044

== Overview of outcome ==
There were total of 11 subsectors being uncontested, most of them are in the First Sector where the business interests are rooted. Nevertheless, the election became much more competitive as supporters of both Henry Tang and Leung Chun-ying, the two potential candidates for the 2012 Chief Executive race, tried to gain as much seats. The pan-democracy camp secured the 150-member threshold to nominate a candidate to challenge to pro-Beijing dominated Chief Executive election in the following year.

=== Catering sub-sector ===
The Catering sub-sector was contested by two candidate lists the Cater17, led by the Catering Legislative Councillor Tommy Cheung Yu-yan and considered Henry Tang's supporters, and 星火行動, led by Simon Wong Ka-wo and considered Leung Chun-ying's supporters. Total of 34 candidates from the two lists equally contested for 17 seats. The Cater17 list won all 17 seats. Notable elected candidates include Allan Zeman, chairman of the Ocean Park Hong Kong.

=== Accountancy sub-sector ===
Many groups contested in the Accountancy sub-sector. The A16 Alliance was formed by accountants from the Big Four firms, the group was considered as Henry Tang's camp. 15 of the 16 candidates were elected with Eric Li got the highest votes.

Two groups called "Your Vote Counts" and "Y5 Give Me Five" were supported by member of the Leung Chun-ying's election campaign office and Accountancy Legislative Councillor Paul Chan. "Your Vote Counts" got two of the six candidates elected and "Y5 Give Me Five" got two of the five.

The Action 9 group was formed with 9 candidates with the election platform of increasing supply of public housing, solving the disparity between the rich and poor and implementing universal suffrage. The group stated that they would not rule out to nominate a pan democrat candidate but also said they were open on the idea of nominating Leung Chun-ying. The group got two members elected.

9 candidates from the pan-democracy were all elected to the Accountancy sub-sector.

=== Chinese Medicine sub-sector ===
The Hong Kong Chinese Medicine Practitioners' Rights General Union challenged the pro-Beijing groups' dominance in the Chinese Medicine sub-sector but all 11 candidates failed to get elected.

=== Education sub-sector ===
The Education sub-sector has been the stronghold of pan-democracy camp. The pro-democratic Hong Kong Professional Teachers' Union put out a 25-candidate list for the 30 seats in the sub-sector in which five of them are also the Democratic Party members. All candidates were elected including Ip Kin-yuen, who won the Education functional constituency seat in the Legislative Council election in the following year.

The pro-Beijing Hong Kong Federation of Education Workers got only one seat. The Education Convergence had 6 candidates and 3 of them were also elected. One of the two candidates from the Hong Kong Women Teachers' Organisation were also elected.

=== Engineering sub-sector ===
Sponsored by the Professional Commons, the pro-democratic group "Engineers for Universal Suffrage" (E4US) put out an 8-candidate list in which two of them are Civic Party members including Albert Lai. Only Albert Lai and one other pan democrat were elected. Other elected members included Lo Wai-kwok who won the Engineering functional constituency in the Legislative Council in September 2012, and Mak Chai-kwong who was appointed Secretary for Development in July 2012 by Leung Chun-ying.

=== Higher Education sub-sector ===
In succession to the 15 candidates group "Academics In Support of Democracy" in 2006 for the previous Election Committee sub-sector election, the group had 24 candidates running for 30 seats in this election. Many of them are with party membership such as Joseph Cheng Yu-shek, Kenneth Chan Ka-lok, and Kuan Hsin-chi are from the Civic Party, Helena Wong Pik-wan from the Democratic Party, and two from the Neo Democrats including Chan King-ming.

=== Information Technology sub-sector ===
IT Voice 2012 is an election coalition for the Information Technology sub-sector election formed by a group of pan democrats including Sin Chung-kai and Charles Mok. All 20 candidates were elected. The pro-Beijing ICT Energy including DAB member Elizabeth Quat got only 8 of the 24 members elected. The Other two elected candidates without affiliation included Ricky Wong.

=== Legal sub-sector ===
22 pro-democratic independent candidates led by former chairman of the Hong Kong Bar Association Edward Chan King-sang formed the "ProDem22" and 8 candidates from the Democratic Party, Civic Party, and the Association for Democracy and People's Livelihood formed the "PanDem8" while the vice-chairman of the Law Society of Hong Kong Ambrose Lam San-keung led another 12 candidates group "Vox Pop" which was considered pro-Beijing. The 30 pan democrat candidates were able to collect all seats while "Vox Pop" failed to get any seat.

=== Medical sub-sector ===
The Medical sub-sector was the most competitive subsector in the election with total 83 candidates running for 30 seats. The Hong Kong Medical Association filled in 30 candidates and half of them got elected. A list led by Ko Wing-man got 2 of the seven candidates elected. The Public Surgeons' United also got 2 of the 8 candidates elected while the Hong Kong Public Doctors' Association failed to win a seat. The 5 members pro-democratic group won 2 seats including the former Legislative Councillor for the Medical functional constituency Kwok Ka-ki.

=== Religious sub-sector ===
10 Election committee members are nominated by the Hong Kong Christian Council (HKCC), which was enlisted as the designated body for the Christian (Protestant) Sub-subsector. HKCC decided to adopt the "one Christian, one vote" method. The voting date was 30 October 2011. A total of 42 candidates were nominated. 17,380 of the 18,051 votes were counted as effective while there were 554 void votes and 117 blank votes. The result was considered as a landslide victory of the pro-Beijing faction.

=== Social Welfare sub-sector ===
The Social Welfare sub-sector was another stronghold of the pan-democracy camp. The Demo-Social 60 filled in 31 candidates in which many of them are the Democratic Party members such as Law Chi-kwong and Yeung Sum. 29 candidates were elected. The pro-democratic social workers' union Hong Kong Social Workers' General Union also had 29 candidates in which 28 of them were elected. A smaller pro-democratic group Progressive Social Work also had 2 of the 8 candidates elected.

The pro-Beijing Welfare Empower Hong Kong failed to win any seat.

=== District Councils sub-sectors ===
The pro-Beijing camp won a landslide victory in the Hong Kong and Kowloon District Councils sub-sector and the New Territories District Councils sub-sector following the major success in the District Council elections in November. The DAB became the largest winner with 55 seats, 26 in the Hong Kong and Kowloon District Councils sub-sector and 29 in the New Territories District Councils sub-sector. The pan-democracy candidates list failed to win any seat.

== See also ==
- 2012 Hong Kong Chief Executive election
- Politics of Hong Kong
