= Edward Wong Ching-yu =

Hong Kong Magistrate

- 王證瑜
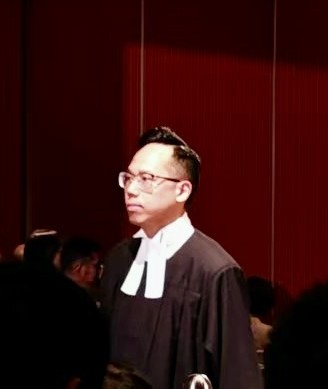

Personal details
- Born: 1982 (age 43–44) Hong Kong
- Education: City University of Hong Kong; Chinese University of Hong Kong; University of Hong Kong; University of Cambridge; University of Oxford
- Occupation: Permanent Magistrate
- Profession: Judiciary

Edward Wong
- Traditional Chinese: 王證瑜
- Simplified Chinese: 王证瑜
Transcriptions
Standard Mandarin
- Hanyu Pinyin: Wáng Zhèngyú
Yue: Cantonese
- Jyutping: Wong4 Zing3 Jyu4

Edward Wong Ching-yu (Chinese: 王證瑜; born 1982) is a Hong Kong permanent magistrate who was previously a practising barrister.

== Early life and education ==
Wong was born in Hong Kong in 1982. He attended St Joseph's Primary School and St Joseph's College.

In 2001, he began reading law at the City University of Hong Kong (CityUHK). In 2002, he was elected President of the Law Students' Society, CityUSU.

Wong earned a Bachelor of Laws with Honours in 2004, Postgraduate Certificate in Laws at CityUHK in 2005, a Master of Arts in Philosophy at the Chinese University of Hong Kong in 2016, a Master of Public Administration from the University of Hong Kong in 2018, a Master of Studies in International Relations at the University of Cambridge in 2023, and a Master of Studies in Practical Ethics at the University of Oxford and Doctor of Philosophy (PhD) in Law at City University of Hong Kong, both in 2026.

== Private practice ==
Wong completed his pupillage and began practising as a barrister at The Chambers of Anthony Francis Neoh, QC, SC, JP in 2006. Over the years, he handled several notable cases, including HKSAR v Tse Sui Luen (謝瑞麟) (DCCC 350/2006) concerning conspiracy to offer advantages to travel agents, HKSAR v Jockey Club Kau Sai Chau Public Golf Course Co Ltd (HCMA 641/2009), HKSAR v Lew Mon-hung (劉夢熊) concerning perverting the course of justice (DCCC 819/2013), HKSAR v Au Yeung Lai Hung Doris [2013] 3 HKLRD 576 in which the Court of Appeal laid down guiding principles on costs in criminal cases, and HKSAR v Lau Shing Chung Simon (2015) 18 HKCFAR 50 in which the Hong Kong Court of Final Appeal ruled on the admissibility of hearsay evidence.

In addition to his private practice, Wong served as a Deputy Magistrate of the Judiciary of Hong Kong from 2014 to 2017.

== Judicial career ==
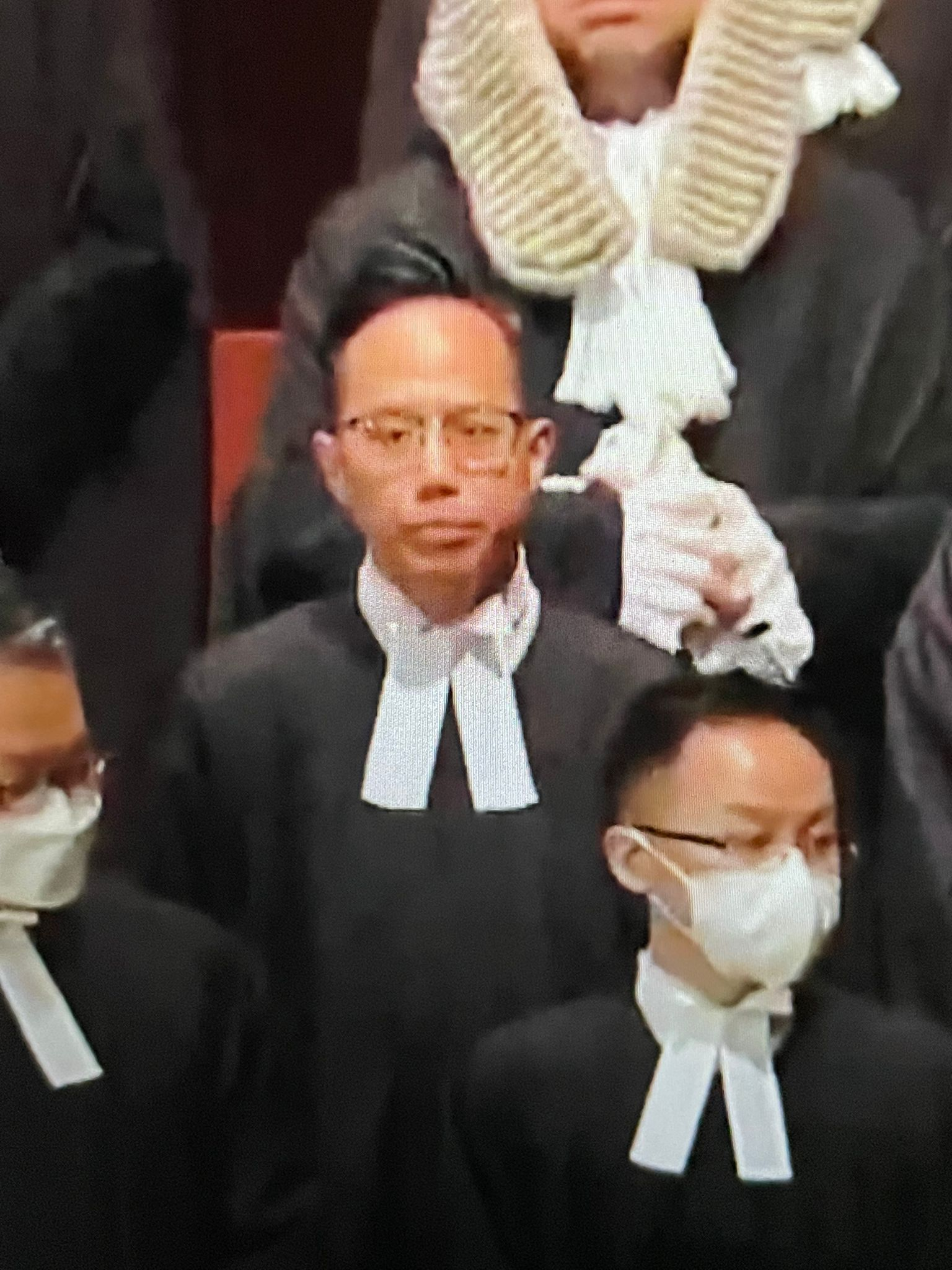

Wong was appointed as a Permanent Magistrate of the Judiciary of Hong Kong in 2017 and has since presided in all seven Magistrates' court (Hong Kong). In 2023 and 2025, he was appointed as a Deputy District Judge of the District Court (Hong Kong).

Cases presided over by Wong include: a former HSBC vice president receiving advantages, sentenced to 9 months’ imprisonment; a police officer possessing dangerous drugs, sentenced to 8 months’ imprisonment; a postman defrauding for overtime allowances; an industrial accident at the Hong Kong–Zhuhai–Macao Bridge construction site resulting in one death and four injuries; a Labour Department inspector committing cruelty to animals, sentenced to 3 weeks’ imprisonment; two quarantine-exempt flight attendants who went out in violation of rules after returning to Hong Kong, sentenced to 8 weeks’ imprisonment; and four Food and Environmental Hygiene Department health inspectors charged with conspiracy to steal food testing samples.

=== Attempted knife attack ===
On November 4, 2024, a man was involved in an attempted knife attack at the Kowloon City Magistrates' Courts. He was swiftly subdued by on-site police officers. The individual had previously been convicted of indecent assault and sentenced to three weeks in prison by Wong in 2021. His appeals against the conviction were dismissed by the Court of First Instance (Hong Kong) of the High Court in April 2024 and Hong Kong Court of Final Appeal in October 2024.

The individual has been charged with attempted wounding with intent and was remanded in Siu Lam Psychiatric Centre under special watch.

In the aftermath of the incident, the Judiciary of Hong Kong, the Department of Justice (Hong Kong), and the Hong Kong Bar Association issued strong condemnations of any attacks on judicial officials.

As a result, the Judiciary of Hong Kong has begun implementing enhanced security measures at Magistrates' Courts, which include increased security screenings and additional personnel. Furthermore, the Judiciary of Hong Kong is collaborating closely with the Police to bolster patrols and other safety protocols, ensuring the protection of judges, judicial staff, and court users.

An editorial in the South China Morning Post underscored that the rule of law hinges on the safety of Hong Kong's judges. It emphasized that attacks on judges are unacceptable, noting that in recent years, some judges in the Region have faced threats, including death threats and harmful substances sent in letters. While safeguarding the courts requires balancing security with operational efficiency, ensuring the safety of judges should remain a top priority.
