= 2012 Hong Kong Chief Executive election =

Election in Hong Kong

- 25 March 2012

All 1,193 votes of the Election Committee 601 votes needed to win
- Opinion polls
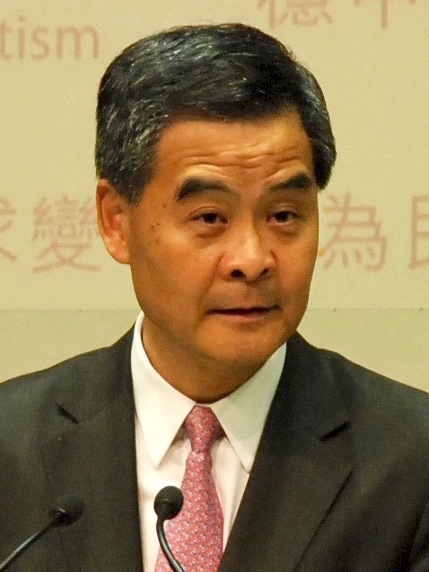

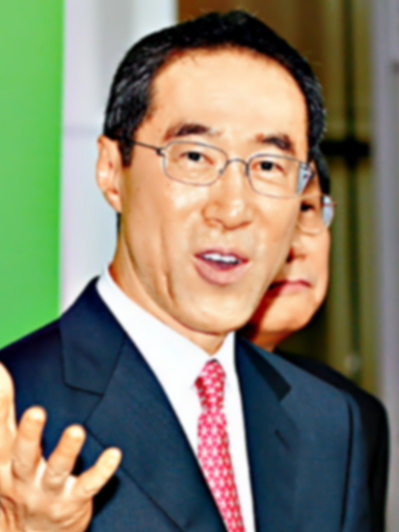

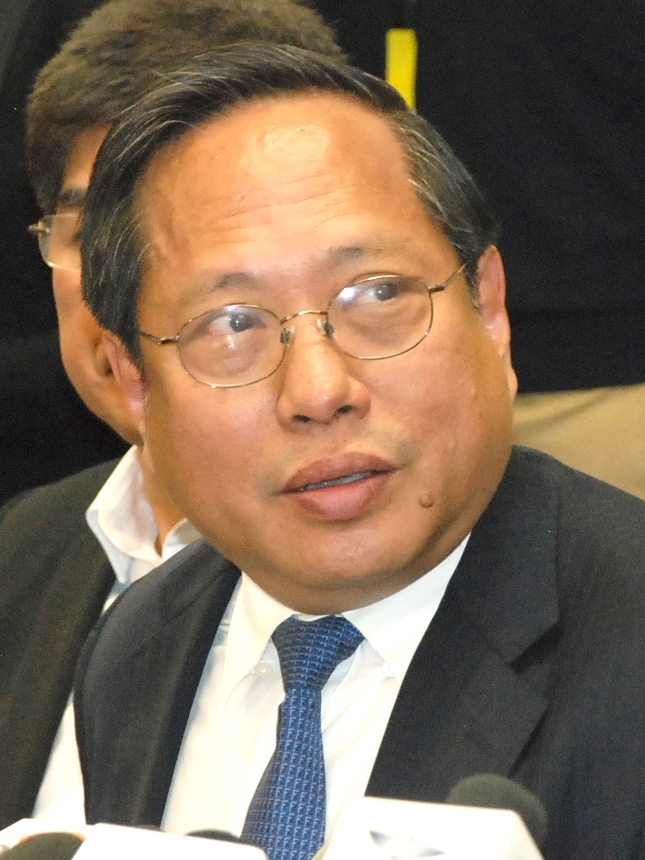
Nominee	Leung Chun-ying	Henry Tang	Albert Ho
Party	Nonpartisan	Nonpartisan	Democratic
Alliance	Pro-Beijing	Pro-Beijing	Pan-democracy
Electoral vote	689	285	76
Percentage	65.62%	27.14%	7.24%
Chief Executive before election
Donald Tsang
Nonpartisan
Elected Chief Executive
Leung Chun-ying
Nonpartisan

The 2012 Hong Kong Chief Executive election was held on 25 March 2012 to select the Chief Executive of Hong Kong (CE), the highest office in the Hong Kong Special Administrative Region (HKSAR), by a 1,193-member Election Committee (EC) to replace the incumbent Chief Executive. Won by the former non-official convener of the Executive Council of Hong Kong Leung Chun-ying, the election was the most competitive as it was the first election with more than one pro-Beijing candidate since the 1996 election.

The incumbent Chief Executive, Donald Tsang, had been elected to serve the remainder of the five-year term which was left unserved, due to the midterm resignation of his predecessor, Tung Chee-hwa. He had served his own full five year term and was ineligible to run for a re-election to a full third term as stated in the Basic Law. Leung Chun-ying ran a successful campaign against Chief Secretary for Administration, Henry Tang, who was seen as the favorite candidate by Beijing officials and business tycoons. The pan-democrats also successfully fielded their own candidate, The Democratic Party chairman, and Legislative Councilor Albert Ho, who won the primary against another pan-democrat legislator Frederick Fung, former chairman of the Association for Democracy and People's Livelihood (ADPL) on 8 January 2012.

The campaign was marked by scandals, dirty tactics, and smears from both Tang's and Leung's sides, notably Henry Tang illegal basement controversy. In the wake of the scandals which damaged Tang's popularity, the election was ultimately won by Leung Chun-ying, who received 689 electoral votes in the Election Committee with the help of the central government's Liaison Office.

== Eligibility, affiliation and election mechanism ==
According to Article 44 of the Basic Law, the Chief Executive must be a Chinese citizen who is a permanent resident of the HKSAR with no right of abode in any foreign country. The individual must be at least 40 years old and has been residing in Hong Kong for a continuous period of no less than 20 years. Article 47 further requires that the Chief Executive be a person of integrity, dedicated to his or her duties. The 1,200-member Election Committee which was elected in the 2011 Election Committee Subsector Elections, which commenced its term of office on 1 February 2012, is composed of 1,044 members elected from 35 sub-sectors, 60 members nominated by the religious sub-sector and 96 ex-officio members, who are members of the Legislative Council or Hong Kong deputies to the National People's Congress. The election committee has no legitimacy in the eyes of the general public, according to Christine Loh.

Nominations for the 2012 election opened on 14 February and closed on 29 February. Each candidacy for Chief Executive must be supported by at least 150 nominations from members of the Election Committee; no EC member may nominate more than one candidate. The election proper takes place by secret ballot, with each EC member having one vote, on 25 March 2012. The successful candidate shall have secured valid votes from more than half the total stipulated number of members, namely 601 votes. If the first round of voting fails to give rise to an outright winner, a second round of voting shall be held the same day after eliminating the lowest-scoring candidate. If a second round still fails to produce an outright winner, the election will be re-run. For this, nominations will reopen, and balloting will take place six weeks later – in this case on 6 May.

Under current laws, candidates are not required to disclose their political affiliations; however, section 31 of Chief Executive Election Ordinance (Cap 569) stipulates that a person elected as the Chief Executive must "publicly make a statutory declaration to the effect that he is not a member of any political party".

== Candidates ==
=== Nominees ===
Candidate	Born	Party	Most recent position	Campaign	Nominations received
Henry Tang 唐英年	6 September 1952 (age 59)	Nonpartisan (Pro-Beijing)	Chief Secretary for Administration (2007–2011)	Announced: 26 November 2011; Nominated: 20 February 2012	390 / 1,193 (33%)
Leung Chun-ying 梁振英	12 August 1954 (age 57)	Nonpartisan (Pro-Beijing)	Non-official Convenor of the Executive Council (1999–2011)	Announced: 27 November 2011; Nominated: 23 February 2012	305 / 1,193 (26%)
Albert Ho 何俊仁	1 December 1951 (age 60)	Democratic Party (Pan-democracy)	Member of the Legislative Council and Democratic Party Chairman (1998–2016; 2006–2012)	Announced: 4 October 2011; Won primary: 8 January 2012; Nominated: 14 February 2012	188 / 1,193 (16%)

=== Withdrawn ===
Candidate	Born	Party	Most recent position	Campaign	Nominations received
Regina Ip 葉劉淑儀	24 August 1950 (age 61)	New People's Party (Pro-Beijing)	Member of the Legislative Council and New People's Party; Chairwoman (2008–present; 2011–present)	Announced: 20 February 2012; Withdrew: 29 February 2012	Withdrawn
Frederick Fung 馮檢基	17 March 1953 (age 59)	Hong Kong Association for Democracy and People's; Livelihood (Pan-democracy)	Member of the Legislative Council (2000–2016)	Announced: 8 December 2011; Withdrew: 8 January 2012; Lost the pan-democracy primary	Withdrawn

Other minor candidates included Kan Kit-hung (簡傑鴻), Yu Wing-yin (余永賢), consultant of the Hong Kong Applied Science and Technology Research Institute, Wu Sai-chuen (胡世全), a former DAB member and Roger Chan Yuet-tung (陳乙東). None of them was successfully nominated.

=== Expressed interest but did not run ===
- Rita Fan Hsu Lai-tai, member of the National People's Congress Standing Committee
- Jasper Tsang Yok-sing, President of the Legislative Council
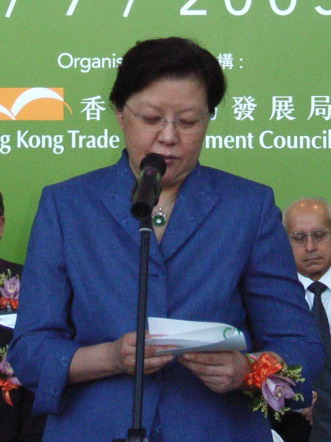
Member of the NPCSC
Rita Fan

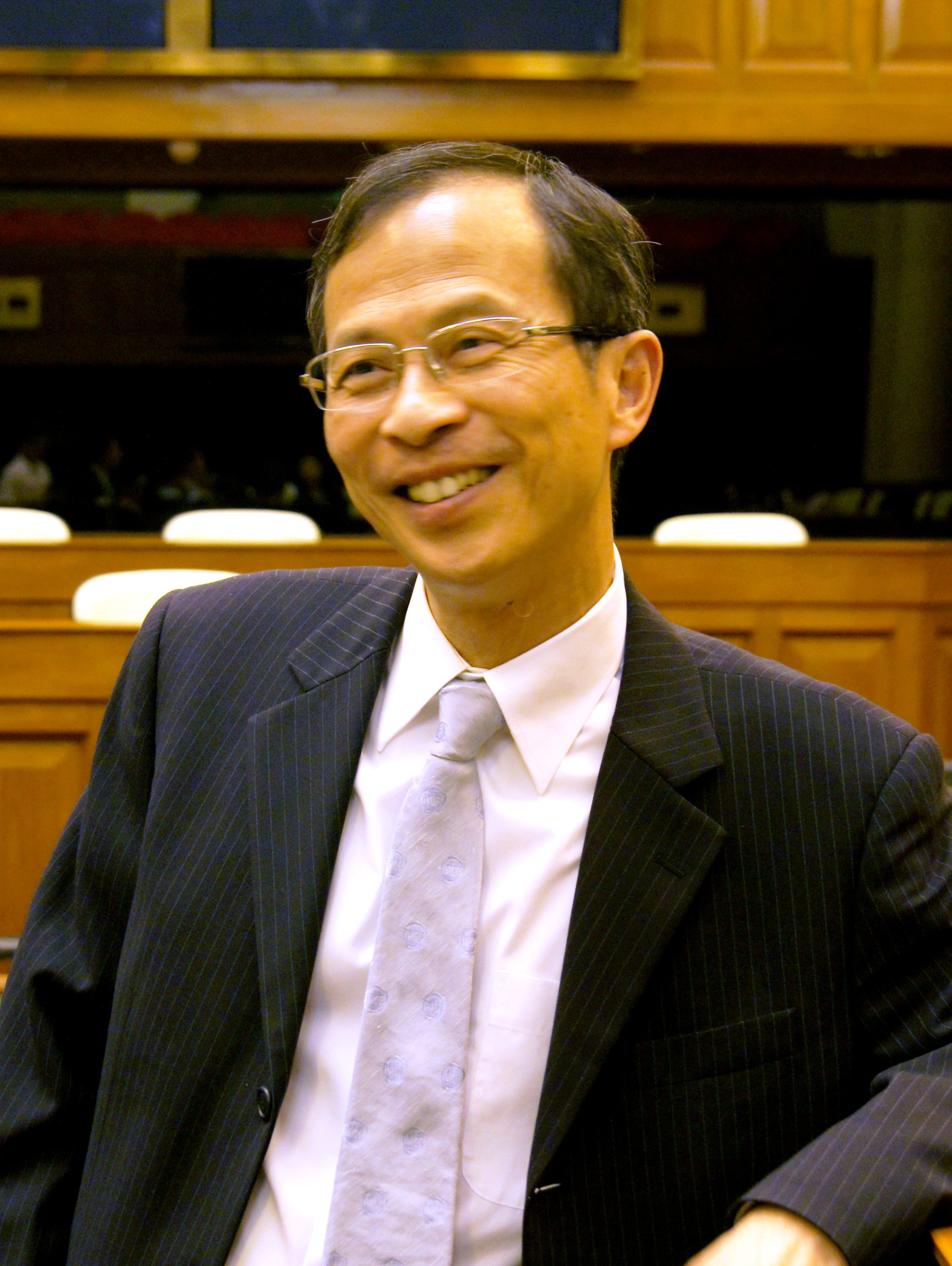
Legislative Council President
Jasper Tsang

== Pre-nomination events ==
The non-official convenor of the Executive Council Leung Chun-ying announced his plan to run on 9 September and resigned from his post in the government in mid-September 2011. Chief Secretary for Administration Henry Tang, considered the first choice of Beijing, resigned from the government in late September 2011. Rita Fan and Regina Ip also said they were considering running for the post, but dropped out on 15 December. Fan lost a lot of public support and respect by taking six months to consider her candidacy. After much prevarication-induced speculation, Fan announced that she would not participate because her age and health would become concerns into the CE term; and she endorsed Henry Tang instead.

=== Pan-democrats' primary ===
Civic Party legislator Alan Leong who contested the 2007 Chief Executive election expressed an interest in standing again but later announced that the Civic Party would not join the election. Albert Ho, the chairman of the Democratic Party decided to run for the post on 4 October 2011. Frederick Fung, former chairman of the Association for Democracy and People's Livelihood (ADPL), also expressed his interest in running for the post, and officially announced his decision to participate in the election on 8 December 2011.

After winning over 150 seats in the Election Committee subsector elections, the pan-democrats conducted the "Pan-dem Chief Executive Primary Election" to decide on a unified candidate for the pan-democrat camp on 8 January 2012. The organising committee consisted of 7 members, representing the Democratic Party, the Civic Party, the ADPL, the Neo Democrats, the Professional Commons, the Power for Democracy and the Hong Kong Democratic Development Network respectively. The 4 co-organising political parties agreed to nominate the winner of the primary election. However, some pan-democratic parties, including the League of Social Democrats, the People Power and the Labour Party, were against the primary election and the "small-circle election" at all. All Hong Kong permanent residents aged 18 or over were eligible to vote at the 74 polling stations; 33,932 votes were cast. The result combined the public voting and the poll conducted by the University of Hong Kong Public Opinion Programme between 3 and 6 January with equal weights. Albert Ho won with 67.2% in the voting and 54.6% in the poll.

Chief Executive pro-democracy primary results
Party	Candidate	Ballots		Polls		Total scores
Party	Candidate	Results	%	Results	%	Total scores
Democratic	Albert Ho	22,148	67.24	217	54.66	60.9
ADPL	Frederick Fung	10,791	32.76	180	45.34	39.1
Abstain		993		611		
Total		33,932		1,008		

=== Early 2012 ===
After Henry Tang became embroiled in an unauthorised building works scandal in February 2012, the field of potential pro-Beijing candidates once again opened up: New People's Party legislator Regina Ip re-announced her interest in running for the post on 20 February; at the same time, Legislative Council president Jasper Tsang of the Democratic Alliance for the Betterment and Progress of Hong Kong (DAB) also said he was "seriously considering" running for the post. In addition to Rita Fan, Financial Secretary John Tsang and Secretary for Development Carrie Lam, businessman Victor Fung and Joseph Yam were touted by pundits as possible candidates. Tsang's final decision not to stand, after ten days of deliberations, was influenced by concerns about the intrusion of party politics into the chief executive race, and the effect of his candidature (and potential success in getting elected) for the DAB in the forthcoming Legislative Council elections in September. Ip failed to receive enough nominations before the deadline and thus did not qualify to stand for the election.

== Nominations ==
The nomination period ran from 14 to 29 February 2012, which Albert Ho was the first declared candidate to submit his nomination, having secured 184 votes (including his own) from Election Committee members. He failed to capture 21 of the known pan-democrat votes.

Nominations by candidate
1. Henry Tang (32.7%)
2. Leung Chun-ying (25.6%)
3. Albert Ho (15.8%)
4. Did not nominate (26.0%)

Henry Tang was the second to submit his nomination; he did so earlier than planned on 20 February after having secured 379 nominations, days after his implication in an illegal structure scandal and on the day the press published allegations of yet another of his extra-marital liaisons. Tang's nominees included most of the major local property magnates: Li Ka-shing, Lee Shau-kee of Henderson Land Development, New World Development's Henry Cheng and Sun Hung Kai Properties' Raymond and Thomas Kwok, Chinese Estates Holdings chairman Joseph Lau, Robert Ng of Sino Group, Hopewell Holdings chairman Gordon Wu; Tang is also endorsed by Heung Yee Kuk chairman Lau Wong-fat and film director Stephen Chow.

Tang's early nomination was seen by some pundits as a strategic move to lock in his gains early; others suggest that it was a pre-emptive move ahead of pronouncements from Beijing.

"Inevitably, [Tang's] refusal to quit has put Beijing in a difficult position as signs of unwavering support will be taken as evidence that the election has a pre-determined winner. Worse, it risks provoking the public further and triggering a crisis if he is allowed to govern with his integrity in shreds."

— Leader, South China Morning Post, 22 February 2012

According to an analysis by the South China Morning Post, support for Tang amongst 12 major property conglomerates accounting for at least 64 seats on the Election Committee was by no means unequivocal: they pledged 38 of these votes to Tang. Three had given more than half of their nominations to Tang, while four gave only half; Wharf Holdings and Swire gave only their chairmen's votes to Tang.

Leung Chun-ying submitted his candidature on 23 February; he received 293 nominations. Leung obtained nominations from 57 of the 60 representatives from the agriculture and fisheries sub-sector, 29 nominations from the labour sub-sector, 25 from the engineering, architectural, surveying and planning sub-sectors, and 12 from the finance and financial services sub-sectors. He also secured 20 nominations from Hong Kong Federation of Trade Unions and about 30 from members of the DAB. Heavyweights who support Leung included former executive councillor Arthur Li, former chairman of Sun Hung Kai Properties Walter Kwok, Shui on Group chairman Vincent Lo and former Broadcasting Authority chairman Daniel Fung. Leung admitted that it was difficult securing the prerequisite 150 votes to enter the race; The Standard cited a source saying that Leung had secured those nominations through efforts of officials of the Central Government Liaison office (CLO).

Pundits reckoned that Tang lost around 100 votes to Leung as a result of Tang's scandals. As Tang enjoyed an advantage over Leung of EC members belonging to the commercial and property development sectors, Leung pledged to serve "all the seven million people in Hong Kong." The DAB and a number of others hinted that they were holding back on their nominations to allow Jasper Tsang to enter the fray should he so wish.

== "Two-horse race" ==
Tang has a reputation of being lazy and unintelligent; Leung is a surveyor with business acumen but who seems to appear cold and brutal. Hence, the Chief Executive election was dubbed as a contest between "the wolf" (referring to Leung) and "the pig" (referring to Tang). Tang's status as the front-runner among those that mattered stems from the fact Tang's father, who originates from Jiangsu, not Guangdong province, is closely connected to a faction close to Jiang Zemin. In early 2012, it emerged that support for Tang may have been played up by people close to Liao Hui, director of the Hong Kong and Macau Affairs Office from 1997 to 2000, to the detriment of Leung, who is an equally acceptable candidate to top leaders. Leung's patriotism and his contributions to Hong Kong – including his involvement in the drafting Hong Kong's Basic Law – are noted, although he remains distrusted by business magnates. Albert Ho, leader of the Democratic Party, is not expected to receive support of any members of the Election Committee apart from those who were popularly elected, and is thus a token candidate in the "small-circle election". Tsang Yok-sing's exit from the forefront on 27 February reaffirmed the two-horse race that Beijing had endorsed.

Top Chinese leaders have stipulated that the next CE would have to be patriotic in the eyes of both Beijing and Hong Kong, have governing and management skills, and command wide public acceptance. Li Jianguo, vice-chairman of the Standing Committee of the National People's Congress, informed local NPC deputies in January 2012 that Leung and Tang were both "acceptable" to Beijing as chief executive candidates, adding that he hoped to see a fair fight in the race. Speaking at a press conference after the close of the fifth plenary session of the 11th National People's Congress, premier Wen Jiabao reiterated the government's position.

"I believe that as long as the principle of openness, justice and fairness is observed and relevant legal procedures are complied with, Hong Kong will elect a chief executive who enjoys the support of the vast majority of Hong Kong people"
Wen Jiabao, 14 March 2012

Analysts said that the fight between the two candidates has upset the political consensus Beijing has sought to cultivate, and caused the leaders embarrassment. Willy Lam of the Jamestown Foundation said: "Beijing felt it has lost face because the two people they have groomed for so long have failed to stand up to the test." Pundit Michael DeGolyer observed that reformists strongly back Leung, and says the contest has implications for the balance of power between reformist vs conservatives in the rest of China.

== Election debate and forum ==
=== Election debate ===
A televised election debate was jointly organised by 11 mass media organisations at RTHK's Broadcasting House in Kowloon Tong on 16 March 2012. 150 guests were randomly invited by the University of Hong Kong and the Lingnan University. During the 2-hour debate, the candidates answered questions raised by the mass media organisations and randomly drawn guest audience, and were allowed to raise questions to other candidates. The hosts were Joseph Tse Chi-fung of RTHK and Hui Fong-fai of TVB.

Afterwards, public concern was raised about Henry Tang's accusations during the debate that Leung had proposed suppressing freedom of speech by shortening the licence renewal term for Commercial Radio in 2003; Tang also alleged that Leung had said in a "top-level meeting" that the government would have to deploy the anti-riot police and use tear gas to handle protests after the massive peaceful demonstration on 1 July 2003 opposing the legislation of Hong Kong Basic Law Article 23. Leung denied both claims immediately, adding that the only "top-level meeting" he had attended was the Executive Council. Arthur Li Kwok-cheung stated that he had not heard Leung making such remarks during ExCo meetings.

Albert Ho used the platform to demand Tang and Leung to state their positions on universal suffrage, in particular the abolition of functional constituencies in the Legislative Council, and on vindication of the Tiananmen protests of 1989. However, neither Tang nor Leung responded directly.

=== Election forum ===
A televised election forum was held at the Kowloonbay International Trade & Exhibition Centre on 19 March 2012. Unlike the debate, the candidates were not allowed to raise questions to each other and no guests from the public were invited. They answered questions raised by a few randomly selected election committee members as well as those previously collected from the public. The host was Ng Ming-lam, who also hosted the debate on political reform between Donald Tsang and Audrey Eu in 2010.

== Scandals and controversies ==
=== Henry Tang infidelity ===
In October 2011 affairs were publicised involving Henry Tang and Shirley Yuen, Hong Kong General Chamber of Commerce CEO and his former administrative assistant, and Elizabeth Chan, Tang's personal assistant in the 1990s; both denied liaisons with him. His wife said in statement to the media that there had been difficult times in their relationship and that he has faults, but that she also appreciated his strengths. According to one media report, the revelations caused Beijing to drop their opposition to Leung standing as a candidate as a safeguard against more scandals involving Tang.

=== Indecision ===
In mid October 2011 there were complaints that the Pro-Beijing candidates had not officially declared to run for Chief Executive. Pan-democrat Emily Lau specifically said Leung Chun-ying and Henry Tang were inviting 10,000 people out to wine and dine on public expenses, and that this was unfair and irresponsible when neither appeared to want to run for chief executive. Rita Fan also flip flopped multiple times. While she wanted to run when she was the most popular, when Tang showed his intention to run, she stepped back and said Tang was an acceptable candidate. However, when the extramarital affair of Henry Tang was exposed, Fan withdrew her support for him.

=== Baptist University poll scandal ===
On 14 January 2012 Zhao Xinshu, dean of Hong Kong Baptist University School of Communication, prematurely presented a survey result showing candidate Leung Chun-ying with only a small lead (6.5% points) over Henry Tang out 836 people surveyed. By the time the survey was completed with the 1000 sample, Leung led Tang by an 8.9% point margin. This caused speculations whether the poll was rigged. On 19 January Henry Tang admitted his communications advisor Lucy Chan Wai-yee had made a call to the Baptist University prior to the announcement of the unfinished result, but denied that he interfered with the poll.

Zhao Xinshu took on the blame, and explained that the early announcement was to avoid losing media coverage to the Republic of China presidential election. The school denied having any political stance. Zhao resigned from the school dean position, but retained his teaching post. School staff, students and alumni were dissatisfied with the short investigation, which lasted only 10 days involving 16 internal school members. Zhao may face further investigation by the ICAC.

=== Leung Chun-ying's conflict of interest allegations ===
In an exclusive in early 2012, East Week magazine said Leung was one of 10 judges in the 2001 concept planning competition for the West Kowloon Cultural District despite his company acting as a consultant for one of the competitors. Leung had declared on 25 February 2002, that he was in no way interested in the competition, whether in a personal or professional capacity.

Upon questioning following the press report, he reiterated: "There was no business relationship, or conflict of interest. I have already reported the case to the jury committee chairman and government bodies ... One quantity surveyor under a particular professional team asked our company about related comments and information on land prices in West Kowloon. But we did not take any money in return." The contestant in question, Malaysian company LWK & Partners, named DTZ Holdings – Leung's company – as a "consultant" in its competition entry. Leung said that he immediately questioned his staff upon learning about it, and had in fact written an explanatory letter to the jury upon being aware.

As the row continued, the government generated further controversy on 8 February when it issued two statements, one explaining the failure of candidate Leung to declare a possible conflict of interest in the West Kowloon Reclamation Concept Plan Competition, and other that cleared Henry Tang Ying-yen of any conflict of interest relating to his decision to lower wine duties when he was financial secretary. A government spokesman insisted it was impartial in issuing the two statements. However, Asia Sentinel suggested the selective leak of such allegations by the government who then refused to make public all the documents relating to the issue as requested by Leung himself was a smear originating from the Tang camp. Leung said he welcomed full disclosure of all the facts and documents relating to his involvement in the contest, including "minutes of judges' panel meetings." The government said that had written to seek consent from both Leung Chun-ying and the contestant's architects TR Hamzah & Yeang to release information concerning their respective roles in the West Kowloon Reclamation Concept Plan.

=== Illegal structures at Henry Tang's home ===
Media-hired cranes stooping over 5 and 7 York Road – Henry Tang's residence – following revelations of illegal structures there.

"As a man, one needs to have shoulders and as a public officer, one needs to have backbone," – Henry Tang, 13 February 2012 (statement in response to press alleged illegal structures at his properties)

Following media allegations of illegal structures at the Kowloon Tong residence of the leading contender, Tang admitted on 13 February that there was an unauthorised structure at his home at No 5A York Road in the form of a canopy above the garage. He also said that there was already an underground garage at his family's adjacent property (7 York Road) at the time of purchase, which had since been deepened "for storage". He said it was not used as a wine cellar.

On 15 February, Chinese-language newspaper Sharp Daily published a set of floor plans purporting to be of the 2,400-square-foot illegal basement at one of Tang's properties comprising a store room, fitness room, changing room, cinema and wine-tasting room dating from 2003. Tang said the drawing "does not match. [The basement] is basically used for storage." The Buildings Department said that the property was inspected on 22 January 2007, and no unauthorised structures were found. Experts believe that the secret basement standing larger than the footprint of the house was no afterthought: engineers have largely discounted the possibility of building such a large underground structure after completion of the main house. The filed building plan showed foundation piles were driven five metres deep, enough space to harbour at least one storey underground. A media and political circus gathered in York Road as inspectors made a site visit on 16 February: media hired building cranes to gain vantage over the property; Leung Kwok Hung led a protest outside Tang's residence. In a press conference, Tang's wife took responsibility for the illegal basement facility. Tang refused media requests to tour the house. He said: "An illegal structure is an illegal structure. It doesn't matter what the facilities inside are." Tang was widely criticised for hiding behind his wife, and was then under pressure to quit the race.

In a poll conducted on 16 and 17 February by the University of Hong Kong on behalf of the South China Morning Post, 51.3% of those polled said Tang should withdraw. Opposition to Tang was 23.5 percentage points higher one week later. Commentators observed that Tang's self-inflicted damage has embarrassed Beijing and made it lose control of the election process.

=== Accusation of "black gold politics" ===
Leung Chun-ying was suspected of being involved with "black gold politics" after the March 2012 issue of East Week reported that his supporter, Lew Mon-hung (Chinese: 劉夢熊), and his campaign officers met with Rural committee members and a Triad member over a dinner at Lau Fau Shan. Attendees from different camps gave different accounts, especially of the appearance of Kwok Wing-hung, nicknamed "Shanghai Boy", who has known associations with Wo Shing Wo. Denying any personal connections with Leung, however, Kwok claimed he met Henry Tang in Tokyo, Japan in 2002 and held a few photos of him. Tang then lodged a complaint to the police, stating that he felt threatened by Kwok's comments. The case is under ICAC and police investigation.

=== Alleged protocol breach ===
Henry Tang's claims during the televised debate on 16 March about what was said during "high-level meetings" set off a storm. During later interviews, he elaborated on the situations where the remarks attributed to Leung Chun-ying were heard. Tang said that the disclosures were made because of the public's right to know, but that the disclosures were impromptu as he was angered by Leung's mention of the sofa in Tang's office allegedly used in Tang's extra-marital affairs.

Five former Exco members stated that they had not heard, or did not remember hearing Leung making such remarks during ExCo meetings. Tang was widely criticised, by pro-Beijing figures, for breaching the confidentiality rule: Chairman of the DAB, Tam Yiu-chung, said no-one had the right to breach confidentiality rule of ExeCo, for whatever reason. Regina Ip, responsible for the legislation of Article 23, questioned the accuracy and appropriateness of Tang's disclosures, saying that she had "no recollection" that such a comment was made. She also criticised Tang for breaching the confidentiality rule, even should his claim be true. Former Secretary for the Civil Service Joseph Wong also said Tang should be condemned but "Tang [must] justify the breach based on the principle of public interest" Senior politician and former Secretary of Justice Elsie Leung rebuked Tang, saying: "The CE election should be conducted in a fair, open and just manner ... If the rule is not properly observed and protected, no one will be willing to join the government or say anything during internal meetings in future." Leung added that "running for the CE is not an excuse to breach this important rule. James Tien, whose resignation from the ExCo forced the government to withdraw the Article 23 bill, said that the confidentiality rule should not be overridden by public interest, otherwise "the government should just make all Exco meetings public". Pan-democrat politicians urged the government to go public on the facts because the public had the right to know what went on.

In response to pressure to clarify the principle of confidentiality, the Executive Council issued a statement that any breach of its confidentiality principle may result in punitive and "legal action" against any offender. The statement, unanimously endorsed by all Exco members, said: "[the principle] must be sternly upheld and respected, and should not be violated." The South China Morning Post cites a reliable source that Beijing was "surprised and disappointed" by Tang's violation of a basic principle, and that his chances were over from that moment.

=== Allegations of Leung Chun-ying's Communist Party membership ===
During the Hong Kong Chief Executive election, 2012, persistent rumours resurfaced of Leung's undeclared membership of the Chinese Communist Party (CCP). Leung constantly dismissed such claims as ungrounded.

In March 2012, former underground communist Florence Leung (梁慕嫻), launched her memoir My Time in Hong Kong's Underground Communist Party (我與香港地下黨), in which she pointed out Leung Chun-ying had to have been an underground communist in 1985 in order for him to have become the Secretary General of the Hong Kong Basic Law Consultative Committee, according to party protocol. She also cited Leung's vague remarks about the 1989 Tiananmen Massacre as a clue to his membership. According to the South China Morning Post, Leung's campaign office said Leung was "not a Chinese Communist Party member and had never requested or been invited to join the party." The pro-Beijing Ta Kung Pao dedicated its entire front page of 24 March to attacking the author and her allegations.

=== Allegations of interference in political reporting ===
Local press has been avidly reporting on efforts of the central government's Liaison Office to rally support behind Leung, but said reports have been creating discomfort for officials. Albert Ho relayed complaints he has received about Liaison Office attempts to intimidate editors and media bosses. Media widely reported that Richard Li had received calls from CLO propaganda chief Hao Tiechuan (Chinese: 郝鐵川) dissatisfied at the reporting at his Hong Kong Economic Journal (HKEJ). Ho said the CLO's actions were creating "an atmosphere of terror" in the territory. The Hong Kong Journalists Association, which noted that the HKEJ had received complaints about its coverage from central government's liaison office, and condemned the "open violation" of the one-country two-systems principle. The International Federation of Journalists (IFJ) has confirmed these allegations and expressed its concern. The IFJ cites an anonymous senior journalist for a Hong Kong newspaper saying that the Liaison Office had called several times "during the last two weeks" criticising the newspaper for alleging that the CLO had attempted to influence EC members; One publisher who is member of the EC also reportedly received calls from the Liaison Office with coded references to the preferred candidate: in line with the shift in reported preference from Tang to Leung, he said that initial emphasis was on 'experience' and 'temperament', but later switched to 'popularity'.

Local media reported that pundit Johnny Lau, who wrote a critique of both Tang and Leung for the Sing Pao Daily News, complained that the journal turned his article into one favouring Leung. Lau said that his intended piece was entitled "Neither Tang nor Leung is worthy of support". In the piece, he opined that "supporting either party would not be conducive to the situation", but the published version read: "If there is really a need to make a choice, then, let's choose Mr Leung Chun-ying." Lau alleges that his conclusion was similarly distorted: "neither Mr Tang nor Mr Leung is worthy of support. They do not deserve sympathy either" was changed to read: "Mr Tang is not worthy of support. Nor does he deserve sympathy." Ngai Kai-kwong, editor-in-chief of Sing Pao said: "the editing might have been too carelessly done." He said the paper had neither exercised censorship, nor had come under pressure from the central government's liaison office.

== Newspaper endorsements ==
Newspaper	Endorsement
Sing Tao Daily	Henry Tang
Ming Pao	Leung Chun-ying
Hong Kong Economic Journal	Henry Tang
Apple Daily	Blank vote
Oriental Daily	Leung Chun-ying
The Sun	Leung Chun-ying
Wen Wei Po	Leung Chun-ying
Ta Kung Pao	Leung Chun-ying
Sing Pao Daily	Leung Chun-ying
AM730	Blank vote

== Polling ==
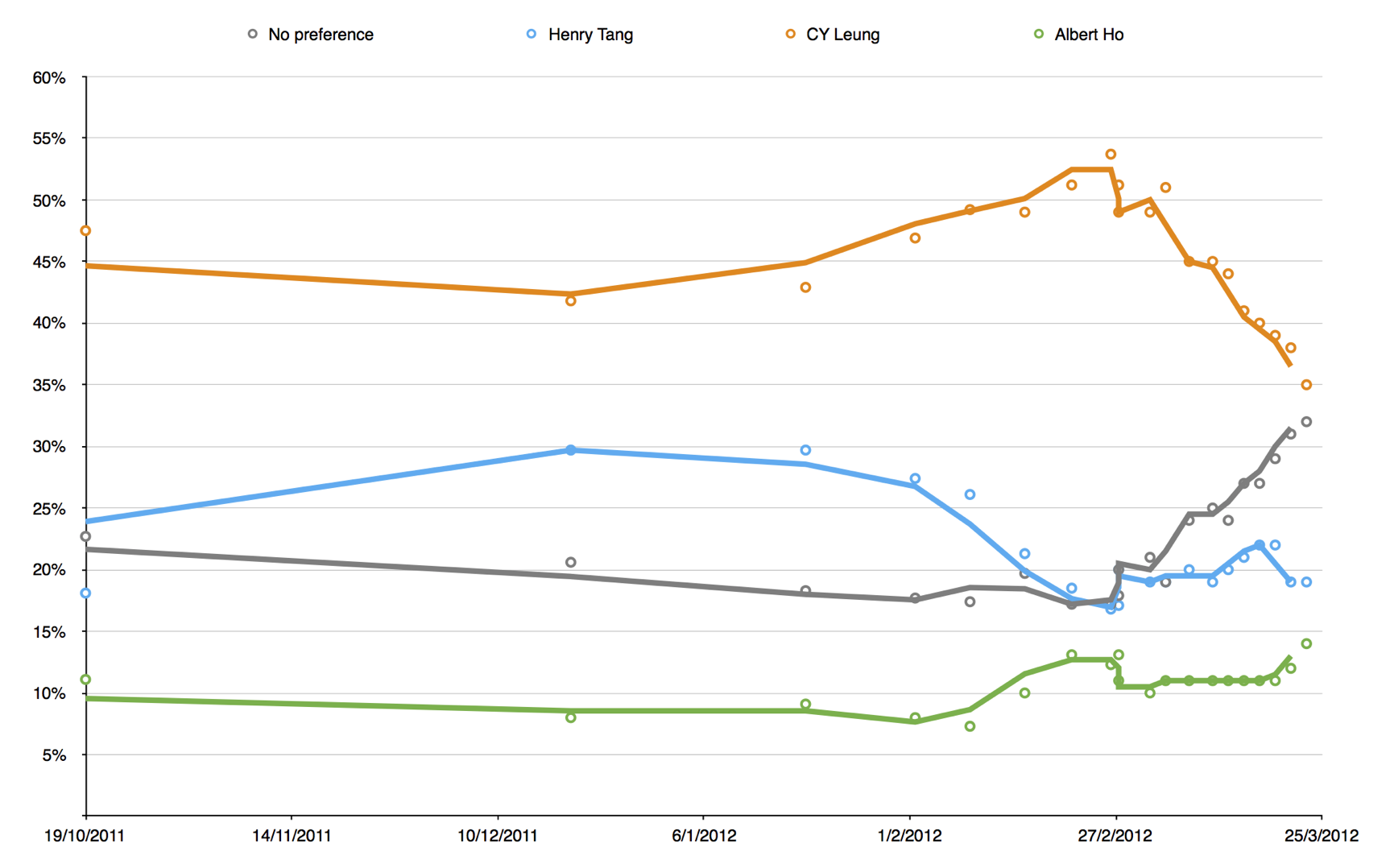

Date(s) conducted	Client/Polling organisation	Sample size	No preference	Henry Tang	CY Leung	Albert Ho	Alan Leong	Rita Fan	Regina Ip	Jasper Tsang	Lead (percentage points)
2012
20–23 Mar	Cable TV/HKU POP	1,031	32%	19%	35%	14%					16%
18–21 Mar	Cable TV/HKU POP	1,018	31%	19%	38%	12%					17%
16–19 Mar	Cable TV/HKU POP	1,026	29%	22%	39%	11%	During the Election Debate and Forum on 16 and 19 March.				17%
14–17 Mar	Cable TV/HKU POP	1,025	27%	22%	40%	11%					18%
12–15 Mar	Cable TV/HKU POP	1,021	27%	21%	41%	11%					20%
9–13 Mar	Cable TV/HKU POP	1,031	24%	20%	44%	11%					24%
6–11 Mar	Cable TV/HKU POP	1,008	25%	19%	45%	11%					26%
3–8 Mar	Cable TV/HKU POP	1,012	24%	20%	45%	11%					25%
29 Feb – 5 Mar	Cable TV/HKU POP	1,005	19%	19%	51%	11%	After the Nomination Period ended on 29 February.				32%
27 Feb – 3 Mar	Cable TV/HKU POP	1,015	21%	19%	49%	10%	−	−	−	−	30%
27–28 Feb	Cable TV/HKU POP	518	20%	20%	49%	11%	−	−	−	−	29%
27–28 Feb	HKU POP	501	17.9%	17.1%	51.2%	13.1%	−	−	−	−	34.1%
27–28 Feb	HKU POP	501	9.4%	14.4%	37.0%	9.8%	−	−	29.4%	−	7.6%
25–27 Feb	HKU POP	500	17.2%	16.8%	53.7%	12.3%	−	−	−	−	36.9%
25–27 Feb	HKU POP	500	8.4%	12.0%	33.8%	4.6%	−	−	27.4%	13.9%	6.4%
20–22 Feb	HKU POP	1,006	9.3%	12.5%	31.2%	6.9%	−	−	27.7%	12.3%	3.5%
20–22 Feb	HKU POP	1,006	17.2%	18.5%	51.2%	13.1%	−	−	−	−	32.7%
20–21 Feb	SCMP/HKU POP	506	14.6%	16.0%	63.9%	−	−	−	−	−	47.9%
13–16 Feb	HKU POP	1,007	19.7%	21.3%	49.0%	10.0%	−	−	−	−	27.7%
6–9 Feb	HKU POP	1,001	17.4%	26.1%	49.2%	7.3%	−	−	−	−	23.1%
30 Jan – 2 Feb	HKU POP	1,002	17.7%	27.4%	46.9%	8.0%	−	−	−	−	19.5%
16–19 Jan	HKU POP	1,022	18.3%	29.7%	42.9%	9.1%	−	−	−	−	13.2%
2011
19–20 Dec	Ming Pao/HKU POP	500	20.6%	29.7%	41.8%	8.0%	−	−	−	−	12.1%
6–7 Dec	Apple Daily/HKU POP	513	23.1%	18.2%	34.7%	6.2%	−	−	17.8%	−	16.5%
28 Nov – 1 Dec	SCMP/HKU POP	1,012	25.0%	23.8%	47.3%	3.7%	−	−	0.2%	−	23.5%
25–28 Oct	Apple Daily/HKU POP	503	15.9%	9.9%	35.3%	2.7%	11.2%	12.3%	12.6%	−	22.5%
17–19 Oct	Ming Pao/HKU POP	505	22.7%	18.1%	47.5%	11.1%	−	−	−	−	29.4%
17–19 Oct	Ming Pao/HKU POP	505	17.2%	14%	40.8%	9.3%	−	18.7%	−	−	22.1%
11–12 Oct	SCMP/HKU POP	533	29.4%	14.0%	29.1%	4.4%	−	19.2%	13.8%	−	15.1%
26–28 Sep	Apple Daily/HKU POP	500	10.5%	16.3%	20.5%	1.3%	10.0%	24.4%	17.1%	−	3.9%
23–25 Aug	Ming Pao/HKU POP	504	15%	15%	14%	−	15%	34%	−	5%	19%
23–25 Aug	Ming Pao/HKU POP	504	23.7%	27.4%	27.9%	−	20.9%	−	−	−	0.5%
21–22 Jun	SCMP/HKU POP	512	25.5%	10.2%	8.3%	−	13.3%	32.9%	9.1%	−	19.6%
16–18 May	Ming Pao/HKU POP	537	16%	10%	6%	−	14%	42%	12%	−	28%
16–18 May	Ming Pao/HKU POP	537	31.5%	24.2%	19.2%	−	25.0%	−	−	−	0.8%
14–15 Jan	Ming Pao/HKU POP	567	29.2%	28.5%	14.5%	−	27.8%	−	−	−	0.7%
2010
17–24 Nov	Ming Pao/HKU POP	576	18.7%	43.2%	13.1%	−	25.0%	−	−	−	18.2%
10–12 Aug	Ming Pao/HKU POP	551	23.3%	31.5%	10.7%	−	24.5%	−	−	−	7.0%
18–19 May	Ming Pao/HKU POP	521	22.9%	32.9%	16.2%	−	28.0%	−	−	−	8.9%
22–25 Feb	Ming Pao/HKU POP	517	26.5%	38.2%	13.3%	−	22.0%	−	−	−	6.2%
2009
19–22 Nov	Ming Pao/HKU POP	503	15.4%	41.9%	14.6%	−	28.1%	−	−	−	13.8%
25–28 Aug	Ming Pao/HKU POP	504	33.0%	40.7%	8.8%	−	17.5%	−	−	−	23.2%

=== Mock polls ===
The Public Opinion Programme of the University of Hong Kong set up a mock "civic referendum" for 23 March dubbed 'PopVote 3.23' funded by public donations. The voting platforms were 15 physical polling stations, and online voting by Internet and smartphone, and was open from 00:01 to 20:00 on 23 March 2012. Organisers expected a participation of 50,000 citizens. POP also set up polls for students at 155 schools in conjunction with the Boys and Girls Association of Hong Kong.

The servers for the on-line voting at popvote.hk were receiving in excess of a million hits each second since several days before polling began. As only IP numbers from abroad were allowed access, organisers believe it was "systematic hacking" from within Hong Kong, seeking to prevent people from voting. Voting at physical polling stations were forced to downgrade to paper methods. Organisers advised citizens to go to the physical polling stations. Civic Party leader Audrey Eu blamed the attacks on "powerful interests who want to prevent others expressing their views". Pollster Robert Chung said 45,000 people were still able to vote despite the disruption. It was announced that voting times were being extended, with 17 polling stations across the territory opening again on the day before the real poll until 16:00. Two HK males, aged 17 and 28, were detained by the police suspected of hacking the election.

There were 222,990 votes cast: there were 85,154 internet, 71,831 Smartphone and 66,005 physical voters over the two-day polling period. The poll results were as follows.

Date conducted	Blank	Leung Chun-ying	Henry Tang	Albert Ho
23–24 Mar	121,580 (54.6%)	39,614 (17.8%)	36,226 (16.3%)	25,452 (11.4%)

== Election ==
=== Tea leaves, central government and voting intentions ===
The PRC leadership has repeatedly outwardly expressed their hope to see "a candidate with strong public support elected smoothly." During the 11th National People's Congress, media interpreted top leaders' support for Leung when Xi Jinping shook hands with Leung supporters, seated in the second row, ahead of Tang supporters seated in the first row. Premier Wen Jiabao's comments were taken by some to indicate a preference for Leung, who was more popular according to opinion polls, although other pundits believed those remarks were neutral.

In the final week before the election Beijing, fearing a deadlock, had thrown its support behind Leung. The South China Morning Post cites a source that central government had informed heads of three Beijing-loyalist newspapers in Hong Kong – Wen Wei Po, Ta Kung Pao and Commercial Daily – in mid March that Leung had won the blessing of the central government. The SCMP noted that the journals, which had scrupulously given both candidates equal treatment up to that point, subtly shifted prominence to Leung in their coverage. The SCMP cites other sources that the central government had mobilised to lobby undecided Election Committee members, or those who nominated Tang, to support Leung. More than 40 EC members who had nominated Tang confirmed that they had been approached by the central government's liaison office in Hong Kong to switch their support to Leung. Other EC members had been summoned to Shenzhen to meet with a state leader, identified as politburo member Liu Yandong, the highest-ranking female politician in the PRC.

Among the 1200 EC members, there have been temptation to cast a blank vote to force a new round of campaign. The front page of the Ta Kung Pao on 22 March stated that casting a null vote was "not an option", Its editorial extolled the virtues of both candidates, whilst stating that a blank vote would be no different from the politicking of "the [democratic] opposition". The same day, Oriental Daily News reported that Tang's campaign had all but imploded amidst a flurry of activity by political heavyweights and kingmakers. Liaison Office deputy head Li Guikang (黎桂康) was reported to have met the representatives of the five leading business organisations for one and a half hours; they did not reveal the content of their discussions. Andrew Leung and Jeffrey Lam, two people considered to be the 'inner core' of the Tang camp, were "in detention" for one more hour. Anson Chan questioned whether "one country, two systems" was being upheld, since the central government liaison office was "very busy getting everybody to put the vote for CY". Albert Ho suggested that many EC members were feeling the pressure from the Liaison Office, and feared repercussions for not voting for Leung. He also said that press reports of the Liaison Office's whipping was subject of Liaison Office complaints to editors and media bosses.

The Liberal Party declared, with two days to go, that ideologically it was unanimously opposed to Leung, and that its EC members would be allowed to vote freely. Although it had originally nominated Tang, many members could not bring themselves to vote for Tang any more. Chairman Miriam Lau and Selina Chow defended their null vote as "the responsible decision" as they could not with all conscience vote for either Tang or Leung; their internal poll of 1,900 people showed 30 percent would cast blank votes. The pan-democrats reached a consensus that they would not support either of the pro-Beijing candidates. They would either vote for Albert Ho, cast a null vote, or abstain from the vote. And should the election go to a second round, pan-democrat EC members would leave the vote en masse in protest against the "small-circle election". The Hong Kong Federation of Trade Unions announced that its block of 60 votes would go to Leung. The Democratic Alliance for the Betterment and Progress of Hong Kong also suggested its 147 electors vote for Leung.

Voting intentions
Organisation/Election Sector	Votes	Leung	Ho	Tang	Blank	Abstention	Type	Source
Pan-democracy camp	appro. 200	No	Yes	No	Yes	Yes	Unbundled	
Liberal Party	29	No	No	Yes	Yes	No	Unbundled	
Hong Kong Federation of Trade Unions	60	Yes	No	No	No	No	Bundled	
Democratic Alliance for the Betterment and Progress of Hong Kong	147	Yes	No	No	No	No	Unbundled	
New People's Party	7	Yes	No	No	No	No	Unbundled	
Hong Kong Professional Teachers' Union (Education and Higher Education sectors)	49	No	Yes	No	Yes	No	Unbundled	
Hong Kong Federation of Education Workers (Education and National People's Congress sectors)	2	Yes	No	No	No	No	Bundled	
Social welfare sector	28	No	No	No	No	Yes	Bundled	
Agriculture and fisheries sector	60	Yes	No	No	No	No	Bundled	
Hong Kong Medical Association (Medical sector)	15	Yes	No	No	No	No	Bundled	
Chinese General Chamber of Commerce (Commerce (second) sector)	18	Yes	No	No	No	No	Bundled	

- Note: Some election committee members belong to two or more categories in the table.

=== Election day ===
A protest occurred on 24 March at Central involving about 100 people complaining about the small circle election committee representing all of the citizens. When EC members arrived to cast their votes on the morning of 25 March, they were greeted by protesters outside the Hong Kong Convention and Exhibition Centre, the venue of the election.

During the election 1,132 votes were cast, CY Leung received 689; Henry Tang received 285, and Albert Ho received 76. Thus, Leung was declared duly elected by the Returning Officer. There were 82 papers declared invalid for various reasons: seventy-five were blank, four papers were marked for both Leung and Tang; One was marked for all three. After the election result was endorsed by the Central Government of the PRC on 28 March, Leung took office on 1 July, for a term of five years.

== Results ==
The election turnout is 94.89%. Of the 1,132 votes cast, 7 votes were invalid and 75 were blank. Leung Chun-ying, winning 65.6% of votes, was declared the winner and the next Chief Executive.

25 March 2012 Hong Kong Chief Executive election results
Party	Candidate	Votes	%	±%
Nonpartisan	Leung Chun-ying	689	65.62	
Nonpartisan	Henry Tang	285	27.14	
Democratic	Albert Ho	76	7.24	
Total votes		1,050	100	
Total valid votes		1,050	92.76	
Rejected ballots		82	7.24	
Turnout		1,132	94.89	–4.23
Registered electors		1,193		

== Aftermath ==
=== Protests ===
After the election results were announced, some of the 2,000 protesters demonstrating against the "small-circle election" attempted to storm and clashed with the police; pepper spray was used. Labour Party chairman Lee Cheuk-yan, who was among the protesters sprayed, said "What I [fear] is white terror, to be upheld by Leung soon after he takes office. People should be aware of that and fight him to the end."

The first big protest after Leung's election took place the next Sunday, in which 15,000 people marched from Central to Sai Wan, where the Central Government Liaison Office (CLO) is located. The Civil Human Rights Front demanded that the CLO stop its political interference in Hong Kong and that Leung Chun-ying should "step down". Commentators pointed out that the unusually large scale of the protest before Leung actually took office displayed public anger at the CLO interfering in Hong Kong elections and fear for the office being the de facto ruler of Hong Kong.

=== Election petition ===
Three months after the election, candidate Albert Ho stated that he would file an election petition, based on the false statements made by Leung during the election period. On the televised election debate, Leung challenged the credibility of Tang, stating that he did not have any illegal constructions in his house; nevertheless, an illegal basement was discovered by a local press at Leung's house in June. Although Leung apologised and restated his negligence, his claim was widely doubted as he was a professional surveyor. An election petition should be filed within 7 days of the election, but Ho intended to apply for an extension of the petition period. Along with an election petition, complaints were filed to the ICAC and a motion of no confidence against the CE-elect would also be moved in the LegCo.
