= Lew Mon-hung =

Chinese politician

- 劉夢熊
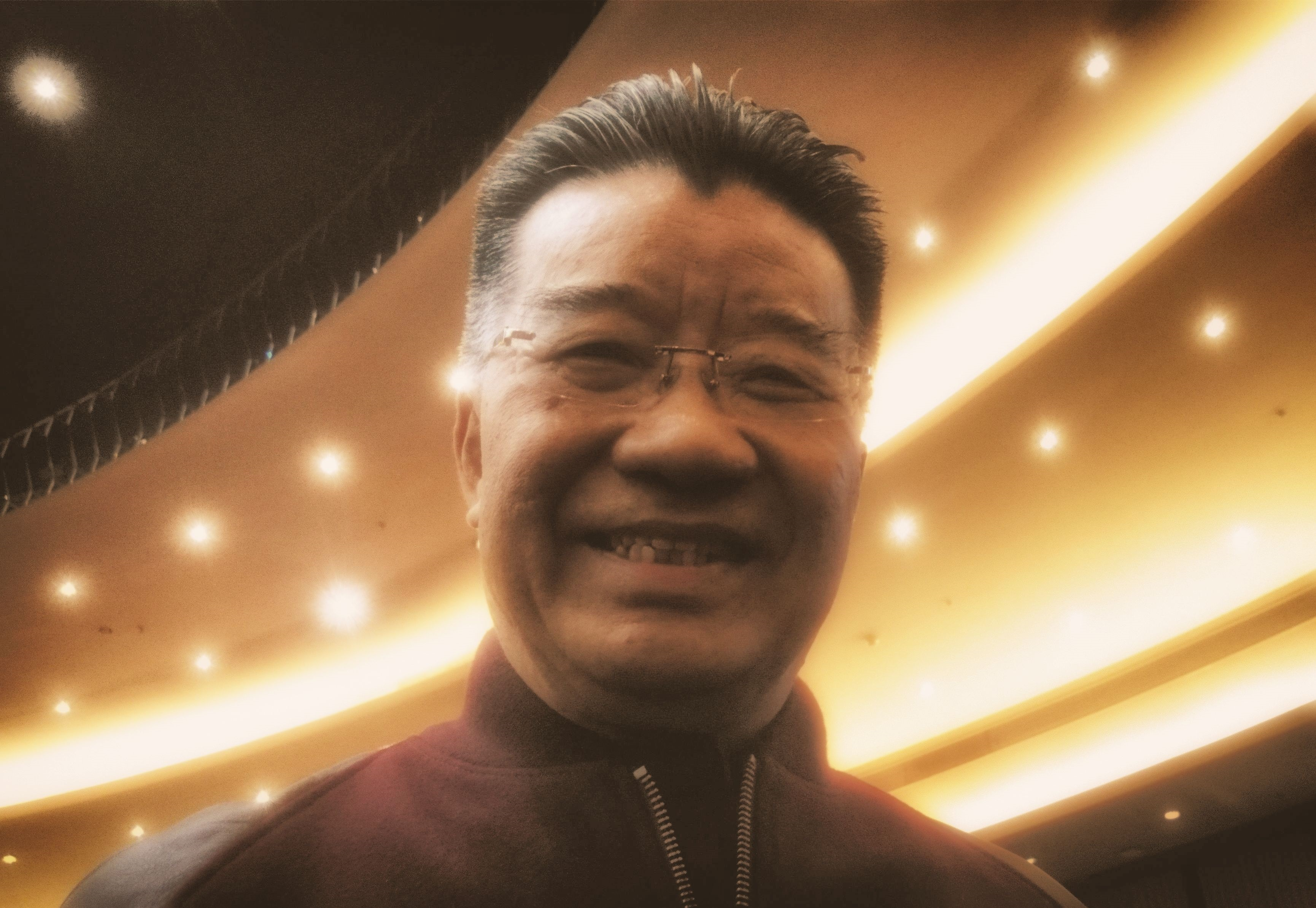

Member of the 11th Chinese People's Political Consultative Conference
- In office March 2008 – March 2013

Personal details
- Born: 11 December 1948 (age 77) Taishan, Guangdong, China
- Education: Affiliated High School of South China Normal University
- Occupation: Businessman and politician

Lew Mon-hung
- Traditional Chinese: 劉夢熊
- Simplified Chinese: 刘梦熊
Transcriptions

Lew Mon-hung (Chinese: 劉夢熊; born 11 December 1948), nicknamed "Dream Bear" based on his Chinese name, is a pro-Beijing Hong Kong businessman, formerly deputy chairman and executive director of Pearl Oriental Oil Limited. Lew was a member of the National Committee of the Chinese People's Political Consultative Conference from 2008 to 2013 and was outspoken as a high-profile supporter of Leung Chun-ying during the 2012 Hong Kong Chief Executive election. The relationship between the two soured after the election and he turned against Leung. In 2016, he was found guilty and imprisoned after being found guilty of perverting the course of justice by asking Leung, in letters and emails, to stop the Independent Commission Against Corruption (ICAC) from investigating him.

== Early life and business career ==
Lew was born in Taishan in Guangdong in 1948. In 1973, he swam to Hong Kong with nothing more than swimwear and took a job at a stainless steel factory and became its head. In 1976, he joined a Japanese futures contract company as a broker. He rose to the chief advisor for the C.A. Pacific Forex Limited (CAPFL). He later moved into the energy industry and became the executive director of the Smart Rich Energy Finance (Holdings) Limited. In 2009, he became the deputy chairman and executive director of Pearl Oriental Oil Limited.

== Political ventures ==
Lew was active in the defending Diaoyu Islands movement. He was a part-time member of the Central Policy Unit from 2006 to 2008 and Commission on Strategic Development from 2009 to 2012. He was appointed a national committee member of the Chinese People's Political Consultative Conference representing Hong Kong, serving in that post from 2008 until 2013, when he lost his seat. He was seen as an outspoken pro-Beijing figure. In 2011, he compared the Hong Kong Autonomy Movement to the Taiwan Independence Movement, and believes that the Hong Kong Autonomy Movement is covertly instigated and planned by Stephen M. Young, who was the then Consulate General of the United States in Hong Kong, in an attempt to split Hong Kong away from China.

From 2011, Lew was a member of the Election Committee through the Religious Sub-sector. He was a high-profile supporter of Leung Chun-ying early in the 2012 Hong Kong Chief Executive Election. His support for Leung began in 2010, when Leung approached him in Beijing to ask him if he could help sway public opinion to his side. Lew pitched Leung to Ma Ching-kwan, then chairman of the Oriental Press Group, publisher of Oriental Daily and The Sun. During the Chief Executive campaign, Leung's chief rival Henry Tang was exposed by the media with a series of scandals, including his illegal basement at his residence. Lew even went to Tang's doorstep, to hand out flyers urging Tang to withdraw from the election. As Tang's popularity suffered severely in wake of the scandals, Beijing eventually turned its favourite to Leung. Lew was also involved in setting up an infamous dinner in Lau Fau Shan between Leung's campaign office and Heung Yee Kuk leaders as well as alleged former triad head Kwok Wing-hung during the election campaign in March 2012.

However, after Leung was elected, Lew made a series of allegations against Leung, including that Leung had failed to honour his promise to nominate Lew as a vice-chairman of the Chinese People's Political Consultative Conference, and that Leung had reneged on appointing Lew to the Executive Council. In 2013, Lew revealed in an interview with iSun Affairs details of Leung’s alleged broken promises and his alleged illegal structures at his home on The Peak.

He became more critical of the Hong Kong government and also some policies of the mainland government. He attended the July 1 march in 2014 opposing Beijing’s controversial white paper on Hong Kong’s autonomy and a demonstration against the abduction of Causeway Bay Books publisher Lee Po. He also endorsed Alvin Yeung of the pan-democrat Civic Party in the 2016 New Territories East by-election. He said that "I will help improve one country, two systems ... by neither allowing Hong Kong to turn into a sovereign state nor one country, one system."

In August 2022, he warned against the Hong Kong government treating the United States and other western countries as enemies, saying that turning Hong Kong into an "anti-U.S. battlefront" would not help the city. He also criticised government officials, such as John Lee, for condemning Nancy Pelosi's visit to Taiwan, saying that the Basic Law stipulates that foreign affairs should be taken care of by the Chinese foreign ministry.

== Charges and conviction ==
Lew was arrested by the Independent Commission Against Corruption (ICAC) on 25 February 2013 on charges of perverting the course of justice when he was alleged to have sent a letter to Leung, asking him to stop the ICAC from investigating him in a fraud case.

In October 2013, Lew was charged with conspiracy to defraud and money laundering, as were two other executives of Pearl Oriental Oil and a third person. In March 2015, he was found not guilty.

However, in February 2016, he was found guilty of perverting the course of justice over the letters and emails he sent to Leung Chun-ying attempting to stop the earlier case. He was found guilty and sentenced to 18 months imprisonment. A year later, on 27 February 2017, he was released from prison after serving two-thirds of his sentence, the norm for good behaviour.

== Awards ==
- Lew was awarded the Bronze Bauhinia Star in 2010 but then stripped of the honour on 3 April 2020.
