= Henry Tang illegal basement controversy =

- Alleged floor plan that surfaced in February 2012 of illegal basement at 7 York Road – Henry Tang's residence.
- Date: February 2012 –
- Location: 7 York Road, Kowloon Tong, Hong Kong; 22.334789°N 114.177822°E
- Participants: Henry Tang, Lisa Kuo (Tang's wife), Government of Hong Kong

The Henry Tang illegal basement controversy (Chinese: 唐英年大宅僭建風波) was an event that began on 13 February 2012 over the unapproved basement extensions of two adjoining residences in Kowloon Tong owned by Henry Tang, a 2012 Hong Kong Chief Executive election candidate. Despite the impact on Tang's credibility, the scandal did not prevent his nomination on 20 February that year.

== Overview ==
=== Wine-cellar rumours ===
Questions asked by the Ming Pao newspaper the previous October met with Tang's denial that he had a basement wine cellar at this residence. On 13 February 2012, he admitted that there was an unauthorized structure at his luxury residence at No. 5A York Road, in the upscale Kowloon Tong district, which he identified as a canopy above the garage. According to Tang, an underground garage on his family's adjacent property (7 York Road) existed at the time of purchase, and had since been excavated "for storage" but not as a wine cellar.

=== Alleged floor plan ===
On 15 February, Chinese-language newspaper Sharp Daily published a set of floor plans purporting to be of the 2,400-square-foot illegal basement at one of Tang's properties comprising a store room, fitness room, changing room, cinema and wine-tasting room dating from 2003.

Tang said the drawing "does not match. [The basement at No. 7 York Road] is basically used for storage." The Buildings Department said that the property was inspected on 22 January 2007, and no unauthorized structures were found. The property was held through a British Virgin Islands company in which he once held shares; Tang had transferred full ownership to his wife in 2010.

A media circus gathered at York Road on 16 February as inspectors made a site visit. Some media organisations hired cranes to get a bird's-eye view of the property while photographers climbed onto the wall to photograph inside the compound. Democrat Leung Kwok-hung led a protest outside Tang's residence and urged him to withdraw from the election.

=== Tang's response ===
On 15 February, having acknowledged the existence of the basement, Tang rejected demands by media organisations to inspect it on grounds of privacy, saying "It doesn't matter what the facilities inside are." In a press conference on 16 February, Tang's wife took responsibility for the illegal basement facility. Tang also apologised for mishandling the issue and for not properly addressing the furore generated. Tang refused to withdraw from the election, and said he had "realized that there was an illegal underground basement in my residence." He blamed the mishandling on the marital problems he was facing at the time. He has been criticised as "hiding behind his wife". On his election website, Tang blamed his woes on "unprecedented attacks, which are wolf-like and fierce".

== Responses ==
=== Media and public opinion ===
The leader of the South China Morning Post of 17 February was highly critical. It asserted that Tang had no option but to quit. It said: "One oversight is perhaps not fatal. But attempts to cover up one's mistakes are political suicide. The chief executive hopeful has given the impression that he has not been telling the truth as the fiasco continues to unfold ... Instead of giving a straightforward answer, he appeared to have played with words and repeatedly dodged the key question to play down the controversy. But his statements have been unconvincing and his explanations have only raised more questions."

Experts commented that the secret basement, standing larger than the footprint of the house, was no afterthought and engineers commented on the near impossibility of building such a large underground structure after completion of the main house. The building plan filed with the Buildings Department showed over-engineered foundations: piles driven five metres deep, sufficient to permit at least one storey underground.

Pundits said Tang, with his privileged background and his tycoon backers, embodied Hong Kong’s political and economic elite which the general public felt was out of touch with the rest of the population. A poll conducted by the University of Hong Kong showed a sharply declining level of support for Tang to stay in the race over the two days of the breaking scandal. Tang's support level among the public continued to nosedive: 66% believed he should quit the race. Opposition to Tang was 72.2 per cent (23.5 percentage points higher) one week after the initial poll.

=== Pro-establishment parties ===
Tang's support from pro-establishment political parties showed signs of softening: the Liberal Party indicated that, although it would not seek the return of its 62 election committee nominations, its members might not vote for him in the election. The Democratic Alliance for the Betterment and Progress of Hong Kong said it would "carefully consider the saga and Tang's personal integrity to determine whether they will nominate and support him in the chief executive election." Despite the scandals, some, such as Peter Woo of Wharf Holdings, continued to support Tang.

Regina Ip, another potential candidate, called on Tang to withdraw from the race, saying that his "integrity and credibility have been tarnished."

== Remedial work ==
The government declined to issue a demolition order on the house, as the owners agreed to remedy the problem. Gregory Wong, former president of the Hong Kong Institution of Engineers, described the work as relatively simple and could be completed within two weeks at a cost of about HK$300,000 (US$38,500).

== Legal and political implications ==
Then Secretary for Development Carrie Lam said that the Buildings Department investigation into Tang's illegal construction would be a drawn-out process. She warned of criminal proceedings against Tang and his wife if there was evidence that drawings submitted to the Buildings Department in 2007 had "knowingly" been misrepresented. Property owners found guilty of knowingly undertaking construction work without government approval may face two years in jail and a fine of up to HK$400,000; owners misrepresenting any drawings submitted to the Buildings Department are liable to a fine of HK$1 million and three years in prison. As the chief executive is not immune from criminal prosecution, representatives of the legal profession on the Election Committee pointed out that such an eventuality could bring the office of chief executive into disrepute, and precipitate a governance crisis.

Commentators observed that Henry Tang had embarrassed Beijing and made it lose control of the election process. Liberal Party chairman James Tien said his party would not support Tang if 50% or more of the public continued to oppose his candidacy, as he feared Hong Kong could "face a governance crisis". He warned that if Tang succeeded in becoming Chief Executive despite his unpopularity, a hundred thousand people might "take their anger onto the streets."

The illegal basement was filled in during March 2013.

In July 2013, Lisa Kuo appeared in court, where she pleaded guilty to one charge of "building an illegal basement", and not guilty to a second charge of "knowingly commencing building works without obtaining approval". The second charge was subsequently dropped. Tang was not charged with any offence. In November, the court fined Kuo a total of HK$110,000. Tang complained about the magnitude of the fine, saying that the heaviest such penalty in the past decade was HK$15,000.
