= John B. Mortimer =

Judge in Hong Kong (born 1931)

The Honourable Mr Justice John Barry Mortimer GBS, SPMB, OBE, KC

President of the Court of Appeal of Brunei Darussalam
- In office 2010–2018
- Preceded by: Sir Noel Power
- Succeeded by: Michael Burrell

Judicial Commissioner of the Supreme Court of Brunei Darussalam
- In office 2005–2010

Non-Permanent Judge of the Court of Final Appeal of Hong Kong
- In office 1997–2015

Vice President of the Court of Appeal of Hong Kong
- In office 1997–1999

Justice of Appeal of the Court of Appeal of Hong Kong
- In office 1993–1997

Judge of the High Court of Hong Kong
- In office 1985–1993

Personal details
- Born: 7 August 1931 (age 95) United Kingdom
- Education: Emmanuel College, Cambridge

John Barry Mortimer, GBS, SPMB, OBE, KC (Chinese: 馬天敏; born 7 August 1931) is a British barrister who has held senior judicial appointments in Hong Kong and Brunei Darussalam.

== Early life and education ==
Mortimer was born in the United Kingdom in 1931. He was educated at St Peter's School, York. He graduated from Emmanuel College, Cambridge with a BA in 1955.

== Legal career ==
Mortimer was called to the Bar at the Middle Temple in England in 1956. He took silk in 1971. He was elected a Bencher of the Middle Temple in 1981.

== Judicial career ==
In 1985, Mortimer was appointed a Judge of the High Court of Hong Kong.

In 1987, Mortimer was brought in to Brunei to hear the case of the National Bank of Brunei.

From 1989 to 1995, Mortimer was a member of the Law Reform Commission of Hong Kong.

In 1993, Mortimer was appointed a Justice of Appeal, and in 1997 became Vice President of the Court of Appeal of Hong Kong (a position in which he served until he retired from the Court of Appeal in 1999). Between 1997 and 2015, he was a Non-Permanent Judge of the Hong Kong Court of Final Appeal.

In 2002, Mortimer was elected as a Senior Bencher of the Middle Temple.

In 2005, Mortimer was appointed as a Judicial Commissioner of the Supreme Court of Brunei Darussalam. Between 2010 and 2018, Mortimer served as President of the Court of Appeal of Brunei Darussalam.

=== Honours ===
In 1999, Mortimer was awarded the Golden Bauhinia Star by the Chief Executive of Hong Kong.

On retirement from the bench in 2018, Mortimer was awarded the Order of Seri Paduka Mahkota Brunei (First Class) by the Sultan of Brunei.

In the 2019 New Year Honours, Mortimer was appointed OBE for services to law by Queen Elizabeth II.

Order of precedence
Previous: Michael Suen; Recipients of the Gold Bauhinia Star	Hong Kong order of precedence Recipients of the Gold Bauhinia Star	Succeeded by Antony Leung; Recipients of the Gold Bauhinia Star
