= Antony Leung =

Hong Kong politician and businessman

Antony Leung Kam-chung GBS OBE JP
- 梁錦松
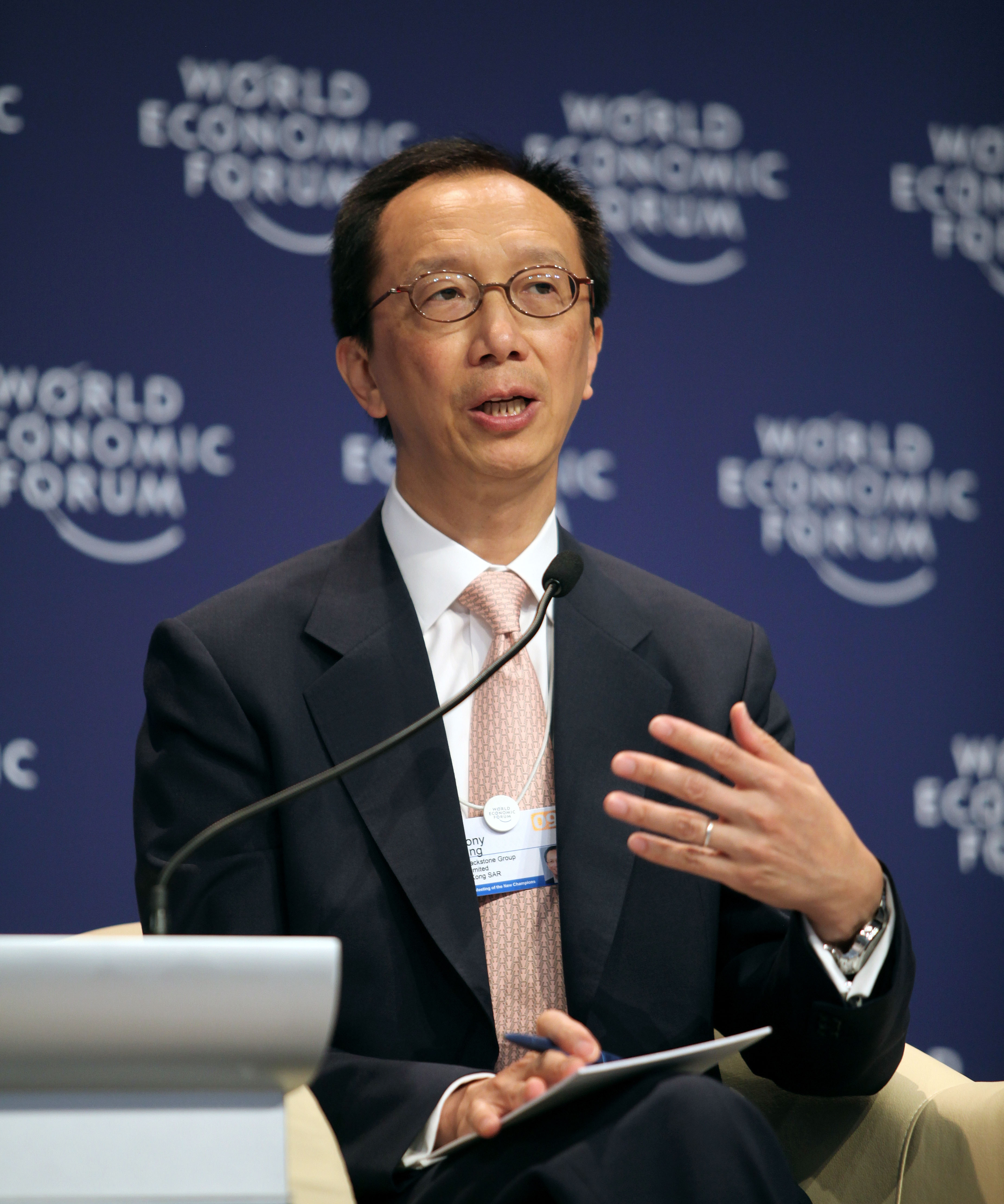

2nd Financial Secretary of Hong Kong
- In office 29 May 2001 – 16 July 2003
- Preceded by: Donald Tsang
- Succeeded by: Henry Tang

Non-official Member of the Executive Council
- In office 1 July 1997 – 30 April 2001
- Appointed by: Tung Chee-hwa

Personal details
- Born: 29 January 1952 (age 74) British Hong Kong
- Spouse: Fu Mingxia
- Education: Ying Wa College; University of Hong Kong
- Occupation: Politician, investment banker

Antony Leung
- Traditional Chinese: 梁錦松
- Simplified Chinese: 梁锦松
Transcriptions
Standard Mandarin
- Hanyu Pinyin: Liáng Jǐnsōng
Yue: Cantonese
- Jyutping: Loeng4 Gam2 Cung4

Antony Leung Kam-chung GBS OBE JP (born 29 January 1952) is a businessman who served as Financial Secretary of the Hong Kong Special Administrative Region (HKSAR), from 29 May 2001 until his resignation on 16 July 2003.

He was embroiled in a financial scandal in early 2003 after it was revealed he had bought an expensive Lexus car shortly before imposing a new car tax, creating a controversy over conflict of interest that earned him the nickname "Lexus Leung" and which ultimately led to his resignation in July of that year.

Leung is currently the Chairman of Nan Fung Group and chairman and co-founder of New Frontier Group.

== Early life and Education ==
Antony Leung was born on 29 January 1952 in Hong Kong. His family has roots in Shunde, Guangdong. He received his secondary education in Ying Wa College and holds a Bachelor of Social Sciences degree, majoring in economics and statistics, from The University of Hong Kong. During his university studies, he actively participated in student activities and was concerned with political issues. He was also a resident of St. John's College. It had been a long-term goal of Leung to be Financial Secretary, according to some classmates. He completed Harvard Business School's Programme in Management Development in 1982 and the six-week Advanced Management Programme in 1999. He received an honorary Doctor of Laws at The Hong Kong University of Science and Technology in 1998.

== Career ==
Leung started his banking career as a currency trader and spent 23 years with Citicorp where he took up regional management positions in investment, corporate and private banking in Hong Kong, New York, Singapore and Manila. Leung rose to senior management positions at big international banks in Hong Kong. He joined Chase Manhattan Corporation in 1996, where he rose to the rank of Asia-Pacific chairman. He oversaw the Asia-Pacific operation of J.P. Morgan Chase & Co., which became the No. 2 U.S. bank when commercial bank Chase Manhattan bought Wall Street investment firm J.P. Morgan & Co. in 2000. He relocated to Singapore shortly before he resigned from JPMorgan to become Financial Secretary.

Prior to becoming Financial Secretary, he was actively involved in public services. He was an unofficial member of the Executive Council (1997–2001 April) and was responsible for Education Reform when he was the Chairman of Education Commission (1998–2001 April). The Chair of the Commission was succeeded by Dame Rosanna Wong Yick-ming, the former Chairperson of the Housing Authority who resigned before a vote of no confidence in the Legislative Council of Hong Kong following a scandal concerning the improper construction of housing estates under the Home Ownership Scheme.

== Financial Secretary ==
Leung became the Financial Secretary on 1 May 2001.

When in office, he proposed, in 2001, to cut the salaries of civil servants by 4.5%. However, in the face of strong opposition, the cut was reduced to 1.8–2.3% and enacted through legislation. After that, the government proposed a further 3% in salary cuts over the following 2 years, 2005 and 2006.

He also stated that the government should succeed in balancing the budget by the 2006–07 fiscal year due to the recovery of the economy and further cuts in government expenditure. He claimed that it was necessary to balance the budget as quickly as possible so as to maintain the stability of the economy. He suggested expenditure cuts in different sectors, including university funding.

In September 2002, new HK$10 notes were co-issued by the Hong Kong Monetary Authority and the Hong Kong government in response to the problem of fake 10-dollar coins. About 10 special features were applied to the new notes.

By the end of 2002, in response to the "penny stock" incident, he set up a 2-person commission, which he was in charge of, to investigate the incident.

=== Harbour Fest ===
After the outbreak of SARS, Leung was responsible for taking action to reinvigorate Hong Kong's economy. After receiving funding of HKD 1 billion from the Legislative Council, Leung was able to launch several initiatives including the "Harbour Fest". Following his resignation, however, the Fest became mired in controversy regarding the chaotic arrangements made with overseas artists like the Rolling Stones, and the financial relationship between the government and the American Chamber of Commerce in Hong Kong to which inexperienced body had been entrusted the Fest's organisation.

Henry Tang, who became Financial Secretary after Leung, said in a TV interview on 29 October 2008 that the contracts between the government and AmCham were signed when Leung was still in office. "AmCham came up with this creative idea for a musical event,... [which] required us to grant it five years' custodial rights, I believe then financial secretary [Leung] thought it was reasonable."

Tang later clarified that the contracts were signed by Rowse and not Leung. Tang said Rowse was a civil servant and as such was not required to be held politically responsible.

=== CEPA ===
Before his resignation, he signed the Closer Economic Partnership Arrangement (CEPA) with China, which, it was believed, could help Hong Kong get out of a prolonged economic downturn.

=== The "Lexusgate" scandal and resignation ===
Leung came under severe criticism in January 2003 when he bought a HK$790,000 (US$101,282) Lexus LS 430, just weeks before he raised the tax on new vehicles in his March budget. Although Leung claimed that he had decided on the tax increase after buying the car, which he said his family needed because of the arrival of his first-born in February. Leung denied that he was trying to avoid the new tax, which would have cost him an additional HK$180,000. (US$23,000). However, unlike other members of the Executive Council, Leung had failed to disclose the purchase to the council. News of the car purchase dealt a blow to the Hong Kong government's credibility as well as to the effectiveness of the newly introduced Principal Officials Accountability System (POAS).

In view of the public outcry, he tried to defuse the controversy by donating money to the Community Chest, a local charity. He also submitted his resignation in March, which Chief Executive of Hong Kong Tung Chee-hwa refused to accept at the time. The government's unwillingness to take action after the scandal broke brought into question the sincerity of Tung's commitment to establishing an accountable government.

Hong Kong's Department of Justice said in July 2003, after receiving a report from the Independent Commission Against Corruption (ICAC), that it was considering whether to charge Leung over the car controversy, which came to be known as Lexusgate.

On 16 July 2003 Leung resigned with immediate effect in the wake of mass protests over the government's handling of a controversial anti-subversion bill, having failed to reduce record high unemployment and revive battered consumer confidence. His resignation came just hours after Secretary for Security Regina Ip said she was stepping down, for personal reasons.

On 15 December 2003, the Department of Justice announced that it was dropping the case against Leung.

== Return to private sector ==
He served as the chairman of Blackstone Group's Asian office in Hong Kong. He continues to serve as a senior adviser to Blackstone and a member of its international advisory board.

Leung has served as chairman at Nan Fung Group, the Hong Kong-based property and finance conglomerate, since February 2014.

Leung is currently the chairman and co-founder of New Frontier Group, an investment holding company with activities in healthcare, education and internet business.

He is also actively involved in charities, serving as chairman of the board of directors of Heifer International's Hong Kong branch.

== See also ==
- List of graduates of University of Hong Kong
- Politics of Hong Kong

== Sources ==
- "How events unfolded", Hong Kong Standard, 16 December 2003.

Political offices
Preceded by Donald Tsang	Financial Secretary of Hong Kong; 2001–2003	Succeeded by Henry Tang
Order of precedence
Preceded by John B. Mortimer; Recipients of the Gold Bauhinia Star	Hong Kong order of precedence Recipients of the Gold Bauhinia Star	Succeeded by John Chan; Recipients of the Gold Bauhinia Star
