= Hong Kong Applied Science and Technology Research Institute =

Hong Kong Applied Science and Technology Research Institute (ASTRI)
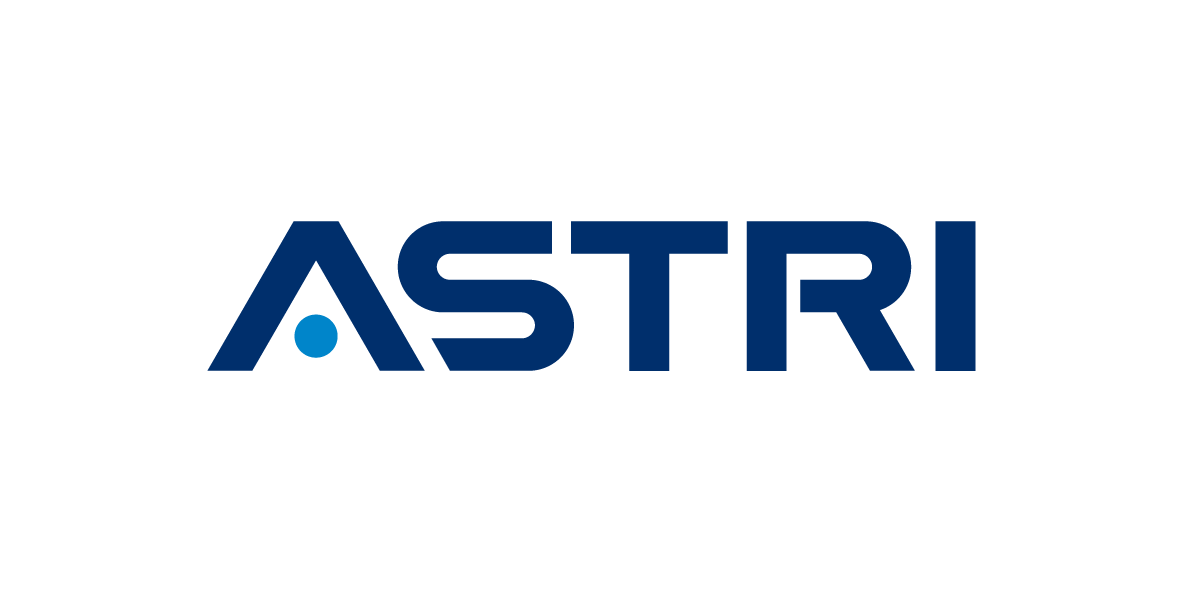
- Native name: 香港應用科技研究院
- Company type: public research institute
- Industry: information and communication technology
- Founded: 2000
- Founder: Government of Hong Kong
- Headquarters: Hong Kong
- Area served: Hong Kong; South China
- Website: www.astri.org

Hong Kong Applied Science and Technology Research Institute (ASTRI) was founded by the Government of the Hong Kong Special Administrative Region in 2000 with the mission of enhancing Hong Kong’s competitiveness through applied research. ASTRI’s core R&D competence in various areas is grouped under five Technology Divisions: Advanced Electronic Components and Systems; Artificial Intelligence and Trust Technologies; Communications Technologies; Intelligent Perception and Control Technologies, and IoT Sensing and AI Technologies. It is applied across six core areas which are Smart City, Financial Technologies, New Industrialisation and Intelligent Manufacturing, Digital Health, Application Specific Integrated Circuits and Metaverse.

Over the years, ASTRI has nurtured a pool of research, I&T talents and received numerous international awards for its pioneering innovations as well as outstanding business and community contributions. ASTRI has transferred about 1,600 technologies to the industry and has been granted close to 1,200 patents in the Mainland, the United States, and other countries. For further information, please visit www.astri.org.

== Board of directors ==
ASTRI is headed by the chief executive officer and is governed by a board of directors from the business and academic worlds of Hong Kong and Hong Kong SAR government representatives. The Board of Directors has established three functional committees, namely the Finance and Administration Committee, the Science and Technology Committee and the Audit Committee to assist the board of directors in governing the academy.

The current chairman of the board is Ir Sunny Lee Wai-kwong, JP. The Permanent Secretary for Innovation and Technology and the Commissioner for Innovation and Technology represent the Hong Kong Government in the Board.

== Senior executives ==
- Chief Executive Officer: Ir Dr Ted Suen, MH
- Chief Technology Officer: Dr Ying Huang
- Chief Operating Officer: Ir Chris Chong
- Chief Financial Officer: Ms. Cammy Yung
