= Sharp Daily =

- Type: Free daily newspaper
- Format: Tabloid
- Owner: Next Digital
- Founded: October 24, 2006
- Ceased publication: August 31, 2018
- Headquarters: 141 Sing-Ai Road; Neihu Industrial Park, Taipei City 114; Taiwan

Sharp Daily
- Traditional Chinese: 爽報
- Simplified Chinese: 爽报
Transcriptions
Standard Mandarin
- Hanyu Pinyin: Shuǎng Bào
- Wade–Giles: Shuang^{3} Pao^{4}
Yue: Cantonese
- Yale Romanization: Sóng Bou
- Jyutping: Song2 bou3

Sharp Daily was a Chinese-language free daily tabloid newspaper, previously published in Taipei, Taiwan and Hong Kong by Next Digital.

== Taiwan edition ==
Launched on 24 October 2006 as a rival to Cola News (Chinese: 可樂新聞; pinyin: Kělè xīnwén), another free tabloid, published by United Daily News, Sharp Daily shares news content with the Taiwanese Apple Daily. According to Forbes each copy costs 2.8 New Taiwan dollars to produce and its target readership is "the train-riding working class". Sharp Daily ceased publication on August 31, 2018.

== Hong Kong edition ==
Sharp Daily was launched in Hong Kong on 19 September 2011 with a stated aim of 1 million copies per day. It was also the first free tabloid newspaper in Hong Kong to have an evening edition, although this was dropped in March 2012. The Hong Kong edition of Sharp Daily was closed down on 21 October 2013 after the owner Jimmy Lai revealed that the newspaper had lost several hundred millions of Hong Kong dollars in two years.
