= Lavender (disambiguation) =

Lavender is a genus of flowering plants, especially the species Lavandula angustifolia.

Lavender may also refer to:

== Film and television ==
- Lavender (1953 film), an Austrian-German film directed by Arthur Maria Rabenalt
- Lavender (2000 film), a Hong Kong film starring Takeshi Kaneshiro, Kelly Chen and Eason Chan
- Lavender (2015 film), a Malayalam film
- Lavender (2016 film), an American drama film
- Lavender (2019 film), an American short LGBT romantic drama film directed by Matthew Puccini
- Lavender (TV series), a 2002 Taiwanese television drama starring Tammy Chen and Ambrose Hsu
- "Lavender" (Ted Lasso), a television episode

== Music ==
- Lavender (album), by Machiko Yamane and Paul Christopher Musgrave
- "Lavender" (BadBadNotGood song), a 2016 song by Canadian rock band BadBadNotGood
- "Lavender" (Marillion song), a 1985 hit single by Marillion based on the folk song
- "Lavender (Nightfall Remix)", a 2017 single by hip-hop rapper Snoop Dogg
- "Lavender", a song on the 1991 Beach Boys compilation album Lost & Found (1961–62)
- "Lavender", a song by Disclosure from Energy
- "Lavender", a song by Two Door Cinema Club from Gameshow

== Places ==
=== United States ===
- Lavender, Georgia, an unincorporated community
- Lavender Peak (Colorado), a mountain in the La Plata Mountains
- Lavender Mountain, Georgia
- Lavender Creek, Georgia

=== Elsewhere ===
- Lavender, Singapore, a sub-zone of Kallang
  - Lavender MRT station
- Lavender (Merton ward), a former electoral ward of Merton London Borough Council 1978–2002
  - Lavender Fields (ward), created in 2002
- Lavender (Wandsworth ward), an electoral ward of Wandsworth London Borough Council created in 2022
- Lavender Peak (British Columbia), Canada, a mountain in the Coast Mountains

== Ships ==
- HMS Lavender, two Royal Navy ships
- USS Lavender, a Union Navy steamer in the American Civil War

== Other uses ==
- Lavender (given name)
- Lavender (surname)
- Lavender (chicken plumage)
- Lavender (color)
- Lavender (AI-powered database), an AI-powered database used by Israel in the Gaza war for target recommendation
- Lavender List, nickname for Prime Minister Harold Wilson's 1976 resignation honors list
- The Lavender List, BBC docudrama about the above list
- Lavender Line, a heritage railway in East Sussex, England
- Lavender (magazine), published in Minneapolis, Minnesota, United States
- Lavender Brown, a fictional character in the Harry Potter books
- Lavender Town, a fictional town in Pokémon Red and Blue

== See also ==
- Lavender linguistics, the study of languages developed among LGBTQ people
- Lavender revolution, sociopolitical movement for gay liberation starting in 1969
- Lavender scare, moral panic about homosexuals in the U.S. government, in parallel with McCarthyism
- Lavanda (disambiguation)
