= Lavender (given name) =

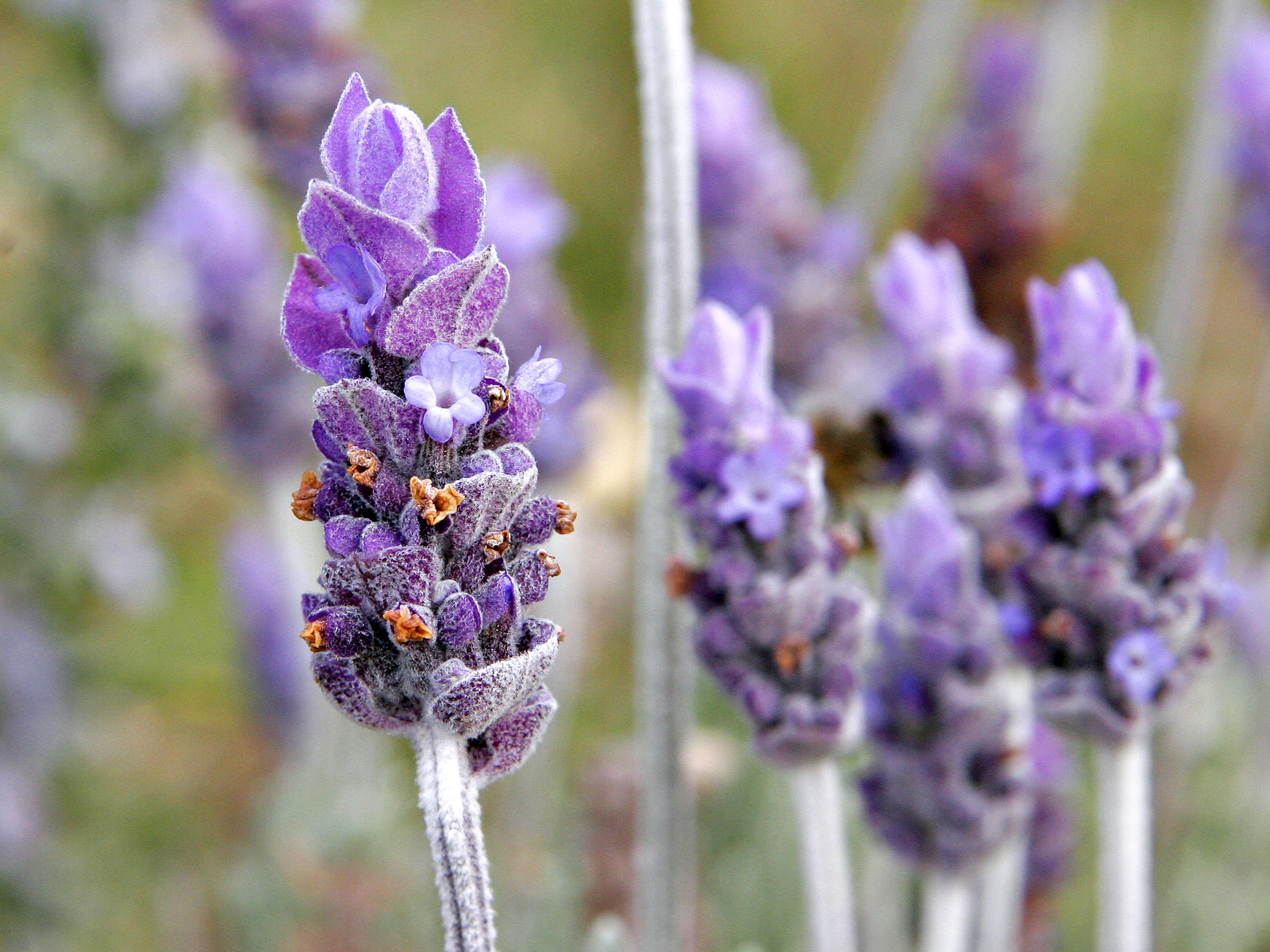
- The name Lavender is most often used in reference to the flowering plant.
- Gender: Primarily feminine
- Language: English

Origin
- Meaning: lavender

Lavender is a given name often given in reference to the flowering plant or to the light purple color. It is derived from the Old French word lavendre from the Latin lavendula. In some instances, it might also be a transferred use of the surname, which originated as an occupational name for a person who worked in a laundry or was a camp follower.

== Usage ==
The name has been in rare, but steady, use in the Anglosphere along with other botanical names since the 1800s. It is currently more often used for girls but was historically also in use for boys. Lavender was among the 1,000 most popular names for newborn American girls in 2024. Lavender debuted in 997th place on the U.S. popularity chart and was given to 258 American girls who were born in 2024. It may refer to:

== People ==
- Lavender "Pinkie" Barnes (1915–2012), English international table tennis champion
- Lavender Cheung, (born 1970) Chinese journalist from Hong Kong
- Lavender Patten (born 1944), British writer and diplomat

== Fictional characters ==
- Lavender, a character in Matilda, a children's novel by Roald Dahl
- Lavender, a character in the Canadian animated children's television series Little Charmers
- Lavender Brown, a character in the Harry Potter novels by JK Rowling and movies based on the books
- Lavender Shade Johnson, a male character in Three Times Lucky, a 2013 adolescent novel by Sheila Turnage
- Lavender Rolt, the main character of Sweet Lavender, a play by Arthur Wing Pinero, first performed in 1888
- Lavender "Popeye" Wolfmeyer, a character in the 2005 American film The Upside of Anger
