= Lavender Peak =

Lavender Peak may refer to:

- Lavender Peak (British Columbia), Canada, a mountain in the Coast Mountains
- Lavender Peak (Colorado), United States, a mountain in the La Plata Mountains
