= Jovica Zarkula =

Serbian politician

Jovica Zarkula (Serbian Cyrillic: Јовица Заркула; born 2 November 1959) is a politician in Serbia. He served for two terms as mayor of Vršac, was a member of the Assembly of Vojvodina from 2008 to 2011, and was a state secretary in the Government of Serbia from 2008 to 2012.

Zarkula joined the Socialist Party of Serbia (Socijalistička partija Srbije, SPS) on its founding in 1990. He was later the leader of the Movement of the Vršac Region–European Region political organization, and in 2016 he joined the Serbian Progressive Party (Srpska napredna stranka, SNS).

== Early life and career ==
Zarkula was born in Bela Crkva, in what was then the People's Republic of Serbia in the Federal People's Republic of Yugoslavia. Raised in the community, he later graduated from the University of Novi Sad Faculty of Law and passed the master's exam at the University of Belgrade Faculty of Law in 1996. He was secretary of Vršac Vineyards for ten years and served as chief of police in Vršac prior to his first term as mayor.

== Politician ==
=== Socialist Party of Serbia ===
Zarkula was elected to the Vršac municipal assembly in the 1996 Serbian local elections. The Zajedno (English: Together) coalition won a narrow majority victory in the municipality, and he initially led the SPS's group in opposition. In September 1997, the Serbian Renewal Movement (Srpski pokret obnove, SPO) assembly group withdrew from Zajedno, and the Socialists were able to form a new administration with Zarkula as assembly president, a position that was at the time equivalent to mayor.

SPS leader Slobodan Milošević was defeated by Vojislav Koštunica of the Democratic Opposition of Serbia (Demokratska opozicija Srbije, DOS) in the 2000 Yugoslavian presidential election, a watershed moment in the political culture of Yugoslavia and Serbia. The DOS also won a landslide victory in Vršac in concurrent the 2000 local elections, and Zarkula's first term as mayor came to an end. After the election, he became director of the Millennium Center in the community.

=== Movement of the Vršac Region ===
Zarkula joined the local Movement for the Vršac Region–European Region political organization after 2000. This group was described as "close to the SPS," and Zarkula continued to hold a membership in the Socialist Party for several years afterward.

Serbia introduced the direct election of mayors for the 2004 Serbian local elections and also separated the positions of mayor and assembly president. Zarkula ran for another term as mayor of Vršac and won a narrow victory over incumbent Milorad Đurić of the Democratic Party (Demokratska stranka, DS). In 2005, Zarkula signed a major agreement on road reconstruction in the community with the Serbian government and the European Agency for Reconstruction.

The direct election of mayors was ultimately a short-lived experiment; with the 2008 local elections, Serbia adopted a system in which mayors were chosen by the elected assembly members. Zarkula was re-elected to the Vršac assembly that year on the electoral list of the Movement for the Vršac Region. He was not chosen for another term as mayor. Zarkula was also elected to the Vojvodina assembly in the concurrent 2008 provincial election and served with the assembly group of the Socialist Party, becoming its deputy leader. The SPS joined a coalition government led by the For a European Vojvodina alliance after the election, and Zarkula was a supporter of the administration. He was also appointed as a state secretary as Serbia's ministry of infrastructure, serving under SPS minister Milutin Mrkonjić. After Vojvodina's conflict-of-interest laws were reformed in 2011, he was required to resign both of his assembly seats to continue as a state secretary. He continued in office after the ministry was given additional responsibility for energy in April 2011.

Zarkula was expelled from the SPS in 2012 and stood down as a state secretary in that year. He appeared in the second position on the electoral list of the Movement of the Vršac Region in the 2012 local elections and was re-elected when the list won a plurality victory with fifteen out of forty-five seats. When the new assembly convened, he was chosen as its president.

In November 2015, he became the leader of the Movement for the Vršac Region. He appeared in the lead position on its list for the 2016 local elections and was re-elected when the list won seven seats. He was confirmed for another term as assembly president after the election.

=== Serbian Progressive Party ===
The Movement for the Vršac Region voted to dissolve itself in late 2016, and in October of that year Zarkula joined the Progressive Party (which already had a majority in Vršac assembly). He stood down as assembly president in September 2017 and served the remainder of his term as an SNS delegate. He was not a candidate in the 2020 local elections.

== Electoral record ==
=== Local (Vršac) ===
2004 Municipality of Vršac local election: Mayor of Vršac (second round results)
Candidate	Party	Votes	%
Jovica Zarkula	Movement of the Vršac Region–European Region	9,869	50.44
Milorad Đurić (incumbent)	Democratic Party	9,695	49.56
Total		19,564	100.00

=== Provincial (Vojvodina) ===
2008 Vojvodina provincial election: Vršac
Candidate	Party	First round		Second round	
Candidate	Party	Votes	%	Votes	%
Jovica Zarkula	Citizens' Group: Movement of the Vršac Region–European Region	8,694	32.99	7,669	55.16
Mirko Dobrosavljević (incumbent)	For a European Vojvodina, Democratic Party–G17 Plus, Boris Tadić (Affiliation: Democratic Party)	6,406	24.31	6,233	44.84
Milovan Milišin	Serbian Radical Party	2,759	10.47		
Dragislav Biočanin	Socialist Party of Serbia–Party of United Pensioners of Serbia	2,692	10.21		
Slavko Timotijević	Together for Vojvodina–Nenad Čanak	1,795	6.81		
Zoran Velimirović	Vojvodina's Party	1,544	5.86		
Duško Solarević	Democratic Party of Serbia	964	3.66		
Todor Groza	Green Party	771	2.93		
Dragan Tikić	Liberal Democratic Party	729	2.77		
Total		26,354	100.00	13,902	100.00
Valid votes		27,695	95.38	13,902	97.36
Invalid/blank votes		1,341	4.62	377	2.64
Total votes		29,036	100.00	14,279	100.00
