= European Agency for Reconstruction =

- Formation: 1 February 2000
- Dissolved: 31 December 2008
- Headquarters: Thessaloniki, Greece
- Location: Operational Centres: Pristina (Kosovo), Belgrade (Serbia), Podgorica (Montenegro), Skopje (North Macedonia)
- Director: Hugues Mingarelli from February 2000 to July 2002 Richard Zink from July 2002 to July 2007 Adriano Martins from July 2007 to December 2008
- Website: ear.europa.eu

The European Agency for Reconstruction (EAR) was created under the mandate of Chris Patten as Europe's Commissioner for External Relations: “the first big test of our ability to run things competently and we passed it, was speeding up delivery by cutting corners where we could, setting up the European Agency for Reconstruction and giving it delegated authority and political cover” (Chris Patten, “Not Quite the Diplomat” ).

The Agency was established by Council Regulation (EC) No 1628/96, as last amended by Council Regulation (EC) No 1756/2006 of 28 November 2006. When it was set up in 2000, the Agency was responsible for managing the EU’s aid programmes in Kosovo.

See video: https://www.youtube.com/watch?v=WfrX5hceRHo&t=6s.

General objectives set for 2000

36. The 2000 work programme for the reconstruction of Kosovo approved by the Commission and the Governing Board concentrated the bulk of the resources available in 2000 on five areas: energy, housing, transport, environment and economic development/agriculture. The Commission and UNMIK considered these sectors to be essential building blocks for the wider reconstruction effort. Considering that progress in energy, housing, transport and agriculture was season-sensitive, the Agency wanted to launch the projects in these areas quickly and accordingly set very ambitious objectives, to be reached before the winter 2000-2001. The Court examined whether these objectives were being achieved at the end of 2000.

Energy

Objectives

37. The 2000 energy programme amounted to 60 million euro. Its general objective was to allow the energy sector to move away from the quasi-emergency holding and stabilisation phases towards making energy generation more stable and productive as a first step to assuring the self-sustainability of the sector. In parallel with this programme, the Agency allocated 28 million euro to UNMIK for energy imports under the 2000 reconstruction programme.

38. To increase the power generation capacity and, crucially, the reliability of the electricity supply, urgent and extensive overhauls to the two power stations were needed. As a result of consultations with UNMIK and other donors, the intervention of the Agency focused on the newer of the two power stations (Kosovo B). As an integral part of the overall effort in the sector, the Agency had also to support the rehabilitation of the lignite coal mines that feed the two power stations. The expected increased production from the mines aimed to match the increased demand for fuel for the newly overhauled units at the power stations.

Results at the end of 2000

39. At the end of 2000, 96% of the funds committed for this sector during the year up to December were contracted, and 59% of that was paid. The overhaul of unit 2 at Kosovo B power station was completed at the beginning of December 2000 before the onset of winter. Unit B1 was running, with some unplanned power cuts, and the repairs continued during the winter. Although the level of production in the lignite mines had increased, it had not yet reached two thirds of the objective (9 000 tonnes a day compared to an objective of 15 000 tonnes) at the end of 2000, but production was still increasing (12 000 tonnes in April 2001). Although power cuts were still occurring, the output of the two power stations ensured that there was usually sufficient electricity, thanks also to EU-funded energy imports, mainly from Bulgaria, the Former Yugoslav Republic of Macedonia (FYROM) and Montenegro.

Housing

Objectives

40. The overall objective of the programme amounting to 55 million euro was to support the Kosovars in reconstructing some 8 000 war damaged houses in the year 2000. This had to be done with grant assistance targeted at the most vulnerable households, especially poorer families and those in temporary accommodation. Reconstruction work on the houses was normally to be undertaken by the beneficiaries on a ‘self-help’ basis, with quality control and any necessary technical support coming from the NGO implementing partners. Where it was deemed necessary to supplement the self-help approach, a beneficiary could also be allocated labour support, or a works contractor for the most vulnerable, especially in the case of completely destroyed homes.

41. In December 2000 an additional amount of 5 million euro was allocated to this programme because the project was focusing increasingly on the most severely damaged houses (56% of the total number assisted), thus requiring additional materials. The supplementary funding also allowed the target to be increased to 8 400 houses.

42. At the same time the Agency also continued with the implementation of the 1999 housing programme amounting to 14 million euro. This programme for the rehabilitation of 3 600 houses (usually without a roof) was initiated by the task force in 1999, but most of the work was carried out during the first half of 2000.

Results at the end of 2000

43. Out of the 60 million euro committed in 2000, nearly 100% was contracted and 54% paid at the end of the year. The programme was initially delayed because municipalities were slow to identify the most vulnerable families who were to benefit from the programme. Often this problem could have been reduced both through a stronger presence by UNMIK and more professionalism on the part of some NGOs. At a later stage the programme also suffered from border-related bottlenecks in the supply of building materials coming from or through FYROM.

44. At the end of December 2000, activity had commenced on some 7700 construction sites in 23 of the 30 municipalities. More than 50% of the 8000 houses initially foreseen were fully completed, more than 65% were weatherproof and habitable. In early April 2001, according to monitoring reports, all the houses already had roofs on. Of the combined target of 12000 houses to be reconstructed with 74 million euro of funding, a total of 8170 homes had already been completed by the Agency during the year 2000. According to NGOs’ progress reports, a further 2000 houses already had roofs on and 1530 were at earlier stages of reconstruction, leaving just 300 more to be started.

45. The pace at which the Agency managed to rebuild houses contrasts with the slow implementation of similar programmes in Bosnia before their management was devolved to the Delegation in Sarajevo. In a letter dated 31 October 2000 the head of UNMIK pillar IV (dealing with reconstruction) said he had been ‘most impressed by the speed with which the European Agency for Reconstruction has disbursed funds, both in comparison with other EU programmes and with other multilateral agencies in Kosovo, and also the low administrative costs and value for money [that the Agency has]’.

46. The Agency drew the lessons from past experience in Bosnia and Herzegovina. It gave priority to the most disadvantaged people, exercised stronger control over the NGOs appointed and ceased to entrust the purchase of building materials to the NGOs, using instead private sector suppliers managed by a procurement specialist appointed by the Agency.

Transport

Objectives

47. An effective transport infrastructure is essential for Kosovo’s reconstruction. The road network is overloaded and in a poor condition and the railway network was under-utilised, mainly due to a lack of appropriate rolling stock. The Agency had to face the constraints presented by limited time for the work, the logistical issues related to supplies and the limited resources. The 2000 programme (15 million euro) therefore focused on the resurfacing of three of the main roads in Kosovo (the Pristina– Skopje road to the Blace border being the top priority), as well as the repair of two important road bridges destroyed by NATO bombing in 1999.

Results at the end of 2000

48. At the end of 2000, 79% of the funds committed in this sector in 2000 were contracted, of which 61% were paid. Most of the work foreseen was completed or on schedule, except the Blace border crossing.

Agriculture

Objectives

49. In 2000 the Commission approved a financing proposal for fostering the economic development of Kosovo amounting to 25 million euro. Among other measures, an amount of 10 million euro was earmarked to boost the rural economy. Agriculture is the most important sector in the Kosovo economy, representing about 50% of GDP in 1999/2000. Yields fell, together with GDP, throughout the 1990s mainly because of reduced access to fertilisers and a decline in agricultural services.

50. The main task for the Agency in this sector was to ensure the availability of 37500 tonnes of fertiliser, or 40% of overall requirements, for the winter wheat and spring cropping season, benefiting at least 30000 farmers, or 40% of all farm households. The objectives were to ensure increases in the production and yields of major crops for the domestic market by restoring soil fertility.

To strengthen the involvement of private sector wholesalers, distributors and retailers in the distribution and sale of farm inputs, in particular fertiliser, it was proposed to provide dealer credit.

Results at the end of 2000

51. As at 31 December 2000, 97% of the funds committed to this programme in 2000 were contracted, of which 53% was paid. The planting fertilisers (NPK) were delivered in September 2000 in time for winter planting. Part of them (2000 tonnes) was delivered free of charge to vulnerable farmers, including minorities, under the supervision of the FAO. The rest was auctioned and contracts were signed with more than 100 dealers.

52. The Agency managed to offer farmers planting fertiliser at an affordable price. The planting fertiliser delivered was widely used and an improved winter crop was expected. According to research carried out at farm level by the University of Pristina, farmers all over Kosovo had access to the product at an average price that was 30% lower than the market price in 1999, and 86,6 % of them purchased planting fertiliser imported by the Agency. The provision of fertiliser was crucial for the resumption of commercial agricultural production and for reversing the decline in overall agricultural output.

53. The auctioning of the fertilisers also contributed to the development of market economic practices. It initiated competition, while at the same time contributing to sustained growth by enabling the private sector to resume the primary role in the supply of fertilisers as well as other agri-inputs. The credit facility allowed suppliers to restore and refurbish warehouses, to replenish stocks and to increase warehouse capacity.

54. At the end of 2000, 83 out of 103 dealers had paid the first instalment into the revolving fund and others who had partially paid the instalment had to pay the remaining amount plus a penalty before mid-April 2001. Six dealers who did not pay used false documents and gave false information about their business in order to gain access to the credit. They resold the fertilisers immediately at a lower price than cost. Investigation was still going on in September 2001.

55. As for the selling of urea fertiliser, the Agency had to cancel the auction because the prices were so high that the fertiliser would have been unaffordable for the beneficiary farmers. The Agency subsequently fixed a lower sales price and distributed it on a pro-rata basis to those dealers selected for the earlier planting fertiliser distribution who had performed satisfactorily. According to the Agency the farmers received most of the fertilisers in time for the spring planting. However, part of the delivery was delayed until April 2001 because transport had to be re-routed through Serbia after the closure of the FYROM/Kosovo border.

Economy of the Agency’s operations

56. In general, the Agency followed the principles of competitive tendering aimed at securing the economically most favourable terms and conditions in its procurement. For reasons of urgency, the Agency sometimes preferred to launch a restricted tender instead of an open international tender. It was often compelled by the special circumstances to reduce the standard period between the date of publication of the tender notice and the deadline for the receipt of bids. This may have reduced competition, but it contributed to the Agency’s achieving most of its objectives.

57. On the other hand, by adapting the standard tendering procedures to allow local suppliers to tender, the Agency managed to keep prices low (see second box, paragraph 34).

The average cost of reconstruction per house was estimated at 6167 euro for the 1999 and 2000 programmes and 7143 euro for the 2000 programme which focused on the most heavily damaged houses. This compares favourably with the average cost of about 10000 euro in Bosnia and Herzegovina.

58. In Bosnia and Herzegovina, however, the reconstruction of houses was intended to encourage the return of refugees or displaced persons. In Kosovo the refugees had already returned and, therefore, the Agency could more often ask the beneficiaries to contribute to the reconstruction. Moreover, in Bosnia and Herzegovina about 80% of the 450000 houses to be repaired ranged from badly damaged to totally destroyed compared to 70% of the 120000 houses to be repaired in Kosovo. Furthermore, in Kosovo, the traditional housing construction standards are lower than in Bosnia and Herzegovina, even if the houses rebuilt by the Agency are often of better standard than the original ones, and labour costs are 30% lower than in Bosnia and Herzegovina.

59. According to data collected by the Court the average house reconstruction costs of the Agency appear to be lower than those of other donors in Kosovo. The cost per house of another major international organisation is reported to be 40% to 45% higher than Agency unit costs.

Effectiveness of the Agency

Short-term impact of the investments

60. According to the Commission, the reconstruction programmes had a positive impact on the economy of neighbouring countries that suffered from the embargo imposed on the Federal Republic of Yugoslavia during the previous years.

Sustainability of investments

61. Although the ambitious objectives had largely been achieved at the end of 2000, there are some major risks as regards the sustainability of the investments made in the various sectors, mainly because of a lack of medium and long-term strategy for the province. UNMIK still had a crisis management approach until mid-2000 and it took nearly a year to develop a medium-term policy.

62. The main question in the energy sector is whether the Kosovo power station will one day be able to work without the help of external donors. The power stations have to become economically viable enterprises. No real strategy was developed for the Kosovo Electricity Company. The majority of consumers do not pay for electricity. A valid revenue structure with a sound electricity tariff system and a proper management accounting system are needed. In the medium term the Agency intends to reorient its efforts from emergency aid towards normal development aid but, in the meantime, a stronger commitment by UNMIK to restructuring the energy sector is required.

63. The sustainability of investments in the transport sector raises some concern. Roads were overloaded, mainly because of the heavy military traffic. The maintenance of the roads is not assured. There is no funding mechanism and there are no plans for the establishment of a road maintenance system. At the end of 2000 UNMIK had not yet defined a transport policy. For the railway sector a master plan was also still missing.

64. In October 1999, UNMIK imposed a set of customs duties and sales taxes collected at the border at a combined rate of 26,5 %. The application of these high rates to agricultural inputs tends to discourage agricultural output, development of food processing, technological change in agriculture and the development of an articulated network of agricultural input suppliers. However, as of the end of 2000, UNMIK had not modified those taxes.

Coordination

65. The Council insisted on coordination with UNMIK, and the international financial institutions, the EIB, the UNHCR and the NGOs. The Agency organises meetings with UNMIK, the Member States represented in Pristina and other main donors on a weekly basis and more often if necessary. At the end of 2000 the EIB, which is also represented on the Governing Board, and the EBRD had not yet started to implement projects in Kosovo, mainly because of the lack of a legal framework.

66. When contracting with NGOs in the framework of the housing programme the Agency applied the same fee rates as ECHO in order to avoid competition between the two sources of EU funding. The phasing out of ECHO activities in Kosovo in the fields of housing/shelter, health, agriculture, water and sanitation was well coordinated

with the activities carried out by the Agency in those sectors.

Efficiency of the Agency

69. The efficiency of the Agency’s administration is high, although the low ratio of the number of employees to the total value of aid managed could also be considered to be a risk factor affecting sustainability. In both contracting and payments for operational activities the Agency has been very fast. Moreover, as regards programme implementation the Agency managed to achieve most of its ambitious objectives set for the year 2000 in the fields of energy, housing, transport and agriculture. The Agency’s efficiency was largely due to the high level of commitment of its staff.

70. Although the usual period for tendering was often reduced and might have affected competition, the Court did not find any evidence that a longer period would have allowed lower prices to be obtained without jeopardising the implementation deadlines. The favourable average cost of reconstruction of houses funded through the Agency compared with other donors is a good indicator that not only efficiency considerations but also those of economy were taken into account.

71. The very flexible application of the rules in force, which involved the Agency taking risks, also allowed many local and regional companies to take part in the reconstruction process. This contributed to reducing the reconstruction costs and to stimulating the recovery of the economy in the Balkan countries which have been severely affected by the conflicts in the region during the last decade.

72. The outstanding performance of the Agency is also due to the fact that in 2000 it focused its human and financial resources on a limited number of priority areas.

Source: European Court of Auditors report about the work of the EAR in Kosovo. (full report: https://eur-lex.europa.eu/legal-content/EN/TXT/PDF/?uri=OJ:C:2001:355:FULL

The mandate of the European Agency for Reconstruction was later extended to manage also the EU's main assistance programmes in Serbia, Montenegro and North Macedonia. The Agency was headquartered in Thessaloniki, Greece, with operational centres in Pristina (Kosovo), Belgrade (Serbia), Podgorica (Montenegro) and Skopje (Republic of Macedonia).

In 2007, a report of the European Court of Auditors to the region stated that “as of November 2006, the EAR has in Kosovo managed over 1 100 million euro on behalf of the Commission, some 91 % of that money has been contracted and some 86 % disbursed. Along with the KFOR troops, the EU's assistance helped normalise life in Kosovo.” (52007SA0005)

In December 2008, the EAR officially closed its doors as its mandate came to an end. Since its creation in the aftermath of the Kosovo War, the agency handled a portfolio of almost three billion euros.

On 24/4/2007, The European Parliament adopted a Resolution, addressing the future of the EAR.

https://www.stradalex.eu/en/se_src_publ_leg_eur_jo/document/ojeu_2008.187.01.0182.01

Council Regulations related to the European Agency for Reconstruction

Council Regulation (EC) No 1628/96 of 25 July 1996 relating to aid for Bosnia and Herzegovina, Croatia, the Federal Republic of Yugoslavia and the former Yugoslav Republic of Macedonia

Official Journal L 204, 14/08/1996 P. 0001 – 0005, 31996R1628

Council Regulation (EC) No 2454/1999 of 15 November 1999 amending Regulation (EC) No 1628/96 relating to aid for Bosnia and Herzegovina, Croatia, the Federal Republic of Yugoslavia and the former Yugoslav Republic of Macedonia, in particular by the setting up of a European Agency for Reconstruction

Official Journal L 299, 20/11/1999 P. 0001 – 0008, 31999R2454

Council Regulation (EC) No 2666/2000 of 5 December 2000 on assistance for Albania, Bosnia and Herzegovina, Croatia, the Federal Republic of Yugoslavia and the Former Yugoslav Republic of Macedonia, repealing Regulation (EC) No 1628/96 and amending Regulations (EEC) No 3906/89 and (EEC) No 1360/90 and Decisions 97/256/EC and 1999/311/EC

Official Journal L 306, 07/12/2000 P. 0001 – 0006, 32000R2666

Council Regulation (EC) No 1756/2006 of 28 November 2006 amending Regulation (EC) No 2667/2000 on the European Agency for Reconstruction

Official Journal L 332, 30.11.2006, p. 18–18, 32006R1756
