= Lavender Patten =

English barrister

The Right Honourable The Lady Patten of Barnes
- Born: Mary Lavender St Leger Thornton; September 19, 1944 (age 81); London, England
- Other names: Hong Kong's First Lady
- Education: St Hilda’s College, Oxford
- Spouses: John Filmer Millen (m. 1966; div. 1968); Chris Patten (m. 1971)
- Children: 3, including Alice Patten
- Family: Sir Jonah Walker-Smith, grandfather Derek Walker-Smith, Baron Broxbourne, uncle

Lavender Patten, Baroness Patten of Barnes (née Thornton; born 19 September 1944) is the wife of Chris Patten. From 1992 to 1997 she was the final British "First Lady" of Hong Kong. During her time in Hong Kong, she patronised 67 charities and organisations. She was the author of Hong Kong Journal in 1997.

== Early life and education ==
Mary Lavender St. Leger Thornton was the third child of father Major John St. Leger Thornton (1911–1944), who was killed in action one month before she was born, and mother Joan Coulton Walker Smith (1907–1961), editor of The Builder magazine. Lavender was christened by the Bishop of Ripon at Ripon Cathedral. Her mother remarried in 1949. She had two older brothers, one step-brother and one step-sister. She attended Roedean School from 1955 to 1961.

When Lavender was 16, her mother died in a car crash. Soon afterwards, her step-family moved to South Africa, leaving Lavender in England. She went on to develop a close relationship with the cartographer Phyllis Pearsall, who had lived with Lavender's mother in Golders Green during the Blitz. Phyllis, known by her family as "Auntie Pig", had helped with Lavender's birth. During Lavender's time in Hong Kong, Pearsall would visit Lavender at Hong Kong's Government House every November.

Lavender read classics at St Hilda’s College, Oxford, but changed to law. She graduated in 1962 and completed her Bar finals via a correspondence course. While at Oxford, Lavender began to date Chris Patten, a student at Balliol College. Howard Marks, a contemporary of Patten at Balliol, wrote in his memoir that he would "let [Chris] sneak his girlfriend, Lavender, through my window".

After graduating, Chris moved to America and Lavender called off their engagement, marrying another Oxford student, John Millen, in 1966. They divorced two years later. She resumed her relationship with Chris, and they married in London on 11 September 1971. They have three daughters, including the actor Alice Patten. In the 1970s, Lavender Patten was "famous for her un-Toryish dress sense".

== Pre-Hong Kong ==
After completing bar school, Lavender moved to London where she worked as an editor for a legal publishing company, going on to become a clerk of the court for the Inner London Crown Court. She was called to the Bar as a family law barrister in 1969. In 1988, after raising her daughters, she started practising as a barrister, specialising in family law at 1 Garden Court Chambers, Temple.

Lavender supported her husband during his political career, including campaigning on his behalf in his Bath constituency, while he was in London running the Conservative Party's 1992 election campaign. At this time, the Pattens lived in Morpeth Terrace in Pimlico and a small cottage in Conkwell, Bath.

== Hong Kong ==
In 1992, Chris Patten accepted the post of Governor in Hong Kong. Patten would hold "little-publicized parties" for children and elderly people at Government House plus "at least 70 full-scale charity balls" throughout their tenure. Of her role as Governor's wife, Jonathan Dimbleby, a close friend, wrote that her "public performance as the governor's wife earned her plaudits throughout Hong Kong and across the political spectrum." Patten redecorated Government House, bringing in Chinese furniture so that "for the first time in 140 years" the house was decorated in a Chinese style.

== Hong Kong patronage ==
During her time in Hong Kong, Patten was patron of at least 67 charities and organisations. Of her work, she said: "I found I could be quite helpful to the community groups by putting a word in the right ear." She was instrumental in altering some traditionally held views, saying: "When we arrived, the authorities there did not have much sympathy for battered wives." By the time she left, this had changed, and "the Government had taken the problem on board; the same with child abuse." She also spoke out over the treatment of people with intellectual disabilities, saying in 1993: "I am confident that sustained public education will bring a better understanding of disabled people."

In January 1995, Patten met Mike Sinclair, a British dentist who was one of only two people in Hong Kong to have gone public with an AIDS diagnosis at the time. The photographs of the two of them together were "compared in the [local] press to the picture of Diana, Princess of Wales with Ivan Cohen, an AIDS patient, in April 1987". Sinclair died a month after their meeting.

When the residents of a housing estate protested about the establishment of a home for people with Down's Syndrome locally, David Tang asked Patten to come to "demonstrate her support", which she did, even though there had been threats to "throw bags of excrement and urine in protest".

Hong Kong charities and organisations of which she was patron include:

- AIDS Hospice
- AIDS Trust Fund
- Cheshire Home, Chung Hom Kok
- Chinese University of Hong Kong
- The Community Chest of Hong Kong, President
- Down's Syndrome Association
- Heep Hong Society
- Helping Hand
- HIV Drop-In Centre, St John's Cathedral
- Hong Kong Advisory Council on AIDS she was patron of Hong Kong's first conference on AIDS in November 1996
- Hong Kong Alzheimer's Disease and Brain Failure Association
- Hong Kong Ballet
- Hong Kong Childhealth Foundation
- Hong Kong Council of Early Childhood Education and Services
- Hong Kong Youth Arts Festival
- Hong Kong Marrow Match Foundation
- The Ladies Lawn Bowls Association of Hong Kong
- Life Education Activity Programme (LEAP)
- Youth Outreach
- Zonta Club – Chair

== Post-Hong Kong ==
After Chris Patten's role in Hong Kong came to an end in July 1997, Patten was keen for him to leave his political career behind, saying: "Quite frankly, I fear for our family life if Chris pursues a political career." The Pattens bought a farmhouse in Tarn, southwest France, in which they lived for a year after leaving Hong Kong. Patten accompanied Chris on a tour of Asia to promote his 1998 book East and West, which he dedicated to her.

Upon her return to England, Patten retrained as a mediator and worked for MiD Mediation and Counselling in Twickenham. In 2000, she was working as a mediator for the Surrey Family Mediation Service. The Pattens' home in England is a mid-19th century house in Barnes, London. In 2005, Chris Patten was created a life peer, Baron Patten of Barnes, with Patten becoming Lady Patten of Barnes.

In the UK, Patten has been involved with the following organisations:

- Support for the Sick Newborn and their Parents
- The Healing Foundation
- Oxford Mindfulness Centre
- Roedean School – President of the Council
- Godolphin and Latymer School – Director (1999–2010)

== Publications ==
- Francis, Elizabeth and Warren, Sarah Divorce and Separation in Hong Kong: You Guide to the law and procedure (1995) Pub: OUP ISBN 978-0195865974 Foreword
- Hartley, Sarah Mrs P's Journey: The Remarkable Story of the Woman who Created the A-Z map (2002) (Pub. Pocket Books) ISBN 978-0743408769 Contributor
- Monk, Lorraine, Liu Jian: Recent paintings on wood/paper (1994) Pub: Alisan Fine Art Foreword
- O’Brien, Charles, Cheng Chung Yau Ling and Rhind, Nancy Responding to Child Abuse: Procedures and Practice for Child Protection in Hong Kong (1997) Pub. Hong Kong University Press ISBN 978-962-209-429-1 Foreword
- Patten, Lavender Hong Kong Journal (1997) Pub. Anova Books ISBN 978-1857933666
