= Armuchee, Georgia =

- Unincorporated community
- Armuchee Community

- Location within Georgia
- Coordinates: 34°23′20″N 85°10′55″W
- Country: United States
- State: Georgia
- County: Floyd, Chattooga
- Elevation: 623 ft (190 m)
- Time zone: UTC-5 (Eastern (EST))
  - Summer (DST): UTC-4 (EDT)
- ZIP code: 30105
- Area codes: 706/762
- GNIS feature ID: 354390

Armuchee (/ɑːrˈmɜːrtʃiː/ ar-mur-chee) is an unincorporated community in both Floyd County and Chattooga County, Georgia, United States. The community is located along U.S. Route 27, 9 miles (14 km) north of Rome.

Armuchee has a post office with ZIP code 30105. The Richard B. Russell Airport is in Armuchee.

== History ==
The community takes its name from the nearby Armuchee Creek, with the word "Armuchee" thought to be of Cherokee or Choctow origin. The exact meaning is contested, as Kenneth Krakow writes that "the name is a Cherokee word that is thought to mean 'hominy,' or may be from the Choctaw, alurnushi, 'hiding place.' Sartain stated that it means 'land of the flowers.' Brinkley says it was named for Am ma choo, an old Cherokee warrior who was protected by a land grant in the 1817 treaty."

A post office called Armuchee has been in operation since 1837.

On November 1, 2020, Donald Trump, the 45th President of the United States, hosted a campaign rally at the airport. Trump would fly to this airport again on March 9, 2024 to hold a rally in nearby Rome, Georgia. He would fly to the airport a final time on February 19, 2026, where he visited local businesses as part of a campaign tour to promote the economy.
