= Not Quite the Diplomat =

2005 book by Chris Patten

Not Quite the Diplomat: Home Truths About World Affairs
- Author: Chris Patten
- Subject: World politics
- Publisher: Penguin Books
- Publication date: September 2005
- ISBN: 0-7139-9855-5
- OCLC: 60668040
- Followed by: Cousins and Strangers: America, Britain, and Europe in a New Century

Not Quite the Diplomat: Home Truths About World Affairs is a book by British politician and former Hong Kong governor Chris Patten. The book was published by Penguin Books in September 2005. The book serves as a pseudo successor to Patten's previous book, East and West. Not Quite the Diplomat was later rewritten for the American market under the title of Cousins and Strangers: America, Britain, and Europe in a New Century.

== Background ==
Patten was the last person to serve as Governor of Hong Kong and later became the European Commissioner for External Relations.

Not Quite the Diplomat serves as an informal successor to Patten's previous book, East and West.

== Synopsis ==
In the book, Patten attempts to provide insights into the world of diplomacy and discusses the position of a unified Europe in relation to the United States and emerging powers such as India and China. The book is critical of the foreign policy of the George W. Bush administration.

== Release ==
Not Quite the Diplomat: Home Truths About World Affairs was released by Penguin Books in September 2005.

A revised version of the book for American audiences was produced titled, Cousins and Strangers: America, Britain, and Europe in a New Century. The book was centered around American politics as opposed to British ones.

=== Critical reception ===
Writing for The Independent, Denis MacShane criticized the book for its various omissions including British support for Apartheid and the alleged interference in the 1992 United States presidential election. Writing for The Observer, Ian Black noted that Patten's best work was on topics unrelated to Britain. Writing for The Guardian, Martin Jacques praised the book, labeling its stances as refreshing writing, "if only his outlook informed the present government's foreign policy".
