= Youth Outreach =

Non-profit organization in Hong Kong

Youth Outreach Hong Kong
- Founded: 1991
- Founder: Dr. Peter Newberry
- Location: Hong Kong, China
- Key people: Mr M. Y. Wan JP (Executive Director), Mr T.H. Chan (Deputy Executive Director)
- Website: youthoutreach.org.hk

Youth Outreach (Chinese: 協青社) is a non-profit organization in Hong Kong established in November 1991 as a crisis intervention center for youth. In the years since its establishment, the organization has been devoting its services to help youth in critical condition or those who face major crisis in their life.
The Chinese name of Youth Outreach is special where the second character "青", meaning green or youth, symbolizes youthfulness and liveliness, and its character position between "協", meaning aid, and "社", meaning society, creates the picture of youth being supported and cared for.

== Background of the organization ==
Youth Outreach was formed in 1991 due to the proposal of the Hong Kong Council of Social Service (HKCSS) to work for youth life crisis prevention and youth healthy development. It provides professional counselling services to the youth as well, who are incapable of handling life crisis incidents on their own.

=== History ===
In 1991, the minute center of Youth Outreach situated in the quarters of Mong Kok was intended to become a one-stop crisis prevention service center under the initiative by Professor Peter Newbery.

In 1992, services were expanded to include a Women's Center in Wan Chai, and a Men's Center in the neighboring district.

In 1993, after the establishment of the "Outreaching Team (Program)”, Youth Outreach was able to extend its service scope to directly find and provide assistance to needy adolescents.

In 1997, the "Men’s Center" was expanded to include independent living dorms in order to accommodate and help find work opportunities to the growing number of older adolescent members in the organization.

In 2002, a new service of Youth Outreach, the "Hang Out" was opened.

In 2004, a new complex building was built in Sai Wan Ho. The complex now serves as the headquarters of Youth Outreach.

=== Organization structure (2009) ===
Patrons	Executive director	Deputy executive director	Assistant executive directors
Lavender Patten	Mr W. Y. Wan JP	Mr T.H. Chan	Ms W. Z. Liu (General Administration & Headquarters)
Ms Betty Tung			Ms X. K. Yip (Outreaching service)
			Mr Y. S. Shum (Crisis Prevention Center)

The organization consists of assistant teams responsible for administration, outreaching, crisis prevention and adolescent development. Under the administration umbrella are public relations, I.T services and headquarter departments. Hangout bar, outreaching teams and customer service fall under the branch of Outreaching. Crisis prevention consists of male & female centers, male transitional housing, and psychological counseling. City Challenge and School of Hip-hop go under the branch of adolescent development.

== Service Units ==
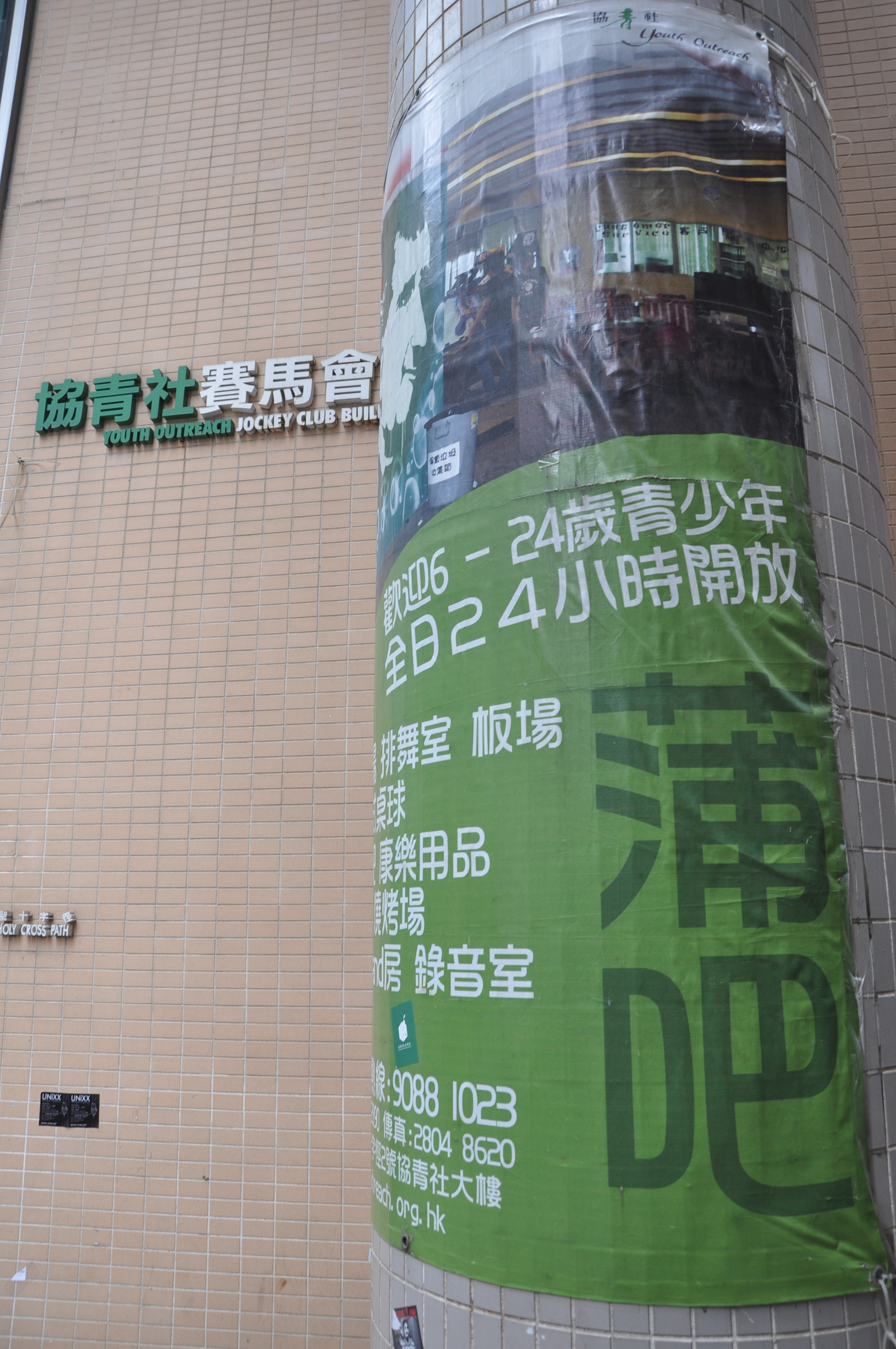
Outside of the Youth Outreach headquarters in Sai Wan Ho, HK

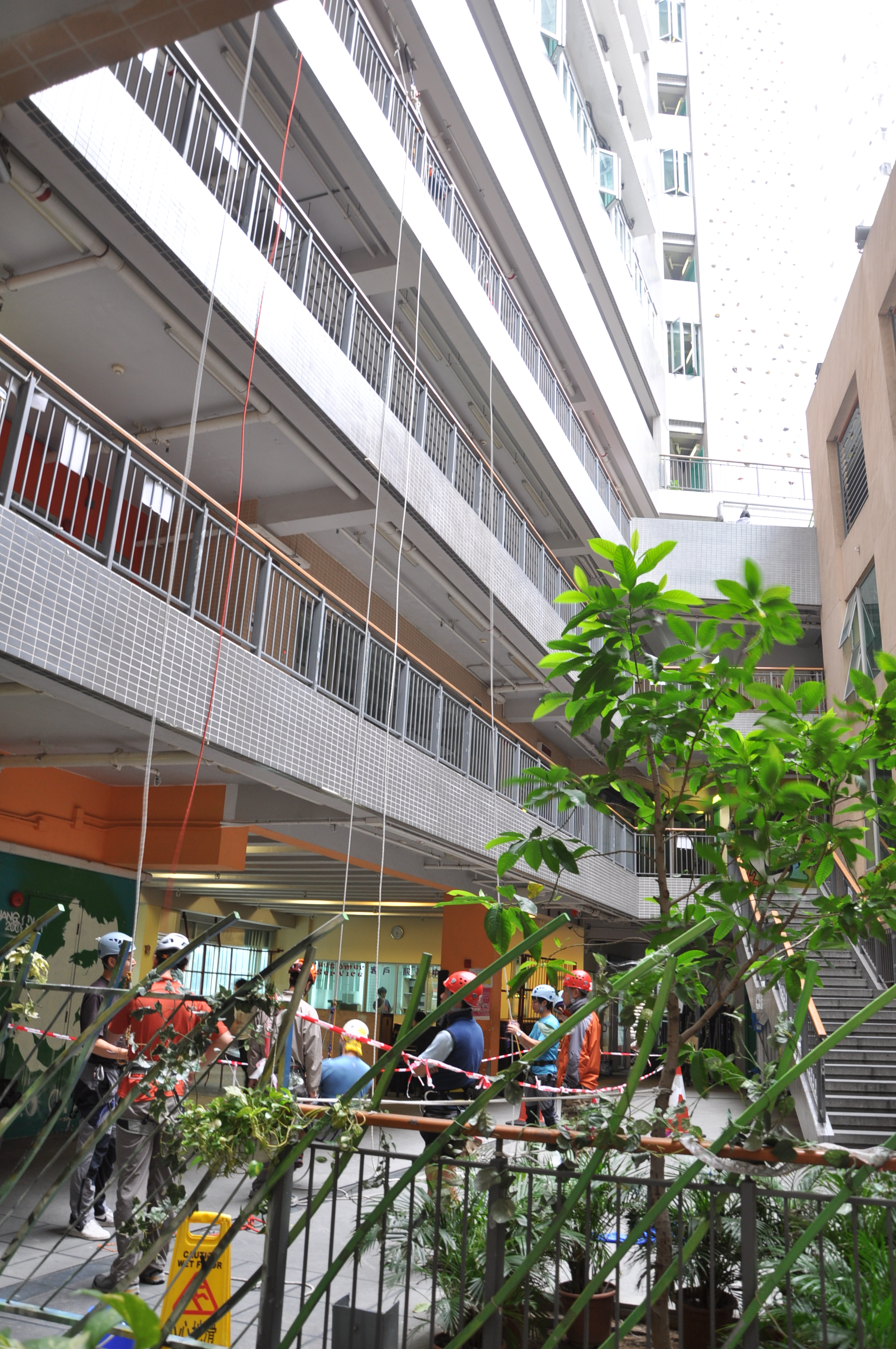
Interior of Youth Outreach headquarters in Sai Wan Ho, HK.

=== The Hang Out ===
The Hang Out occupies most of the floors of the Youth Outreach headquarters. It is open 24 hours a day, seven days a week to young people aged 6 to 24. In addition to providing young people with a place to chill out safely, the Hang Out organizes regular activities for its members with social workers present to provide appropriate help when needed. Its facilities range from band rooms to barbecue courts.

==== Street Rover ====
Youth Outreach established an all-night outreaching supporting team which is an external branch of the Hang Out in 1992. Everyday from 10pm until 6am the next day, the team of social workers drive along streets in this 5.5 ton multi-facility 'teen' friendly lorry searching and offering assistance to suspected street wandering youth. A wide range of entertainment equipment is carried on board the rover, providing youth with a safe leisure environment.

=== Crisis Prevention Centers ===
The center is a free, 24-hour temporary family styled residential center offered by the organization to house youth between the ages of 8 and 18 who have left their homes. In the centers, homeless youths are trained with skills of independence and self-sufficiency. There are 20 beds for boys and 20 beds for girls. Residential application is based on the individuals' situation as well as direct referrals from teachers, churches and other non-profit organizations. Social workers under the organization are responsible for helping to solve conflicts between teenagers and their parents. The centre allows teenagers to stay at most up to two months, then they are either sent to long-term residential or to other relatives. Both of the male and female centers provide youths staying full recreational services and daily provisions. Once they leave, the organization conducts follow up work that lasts for three to six-month, aiming to assess the adjustment of the youth.

Special services in the female centers cover the physical, intellectual and psychological training for young women. The teenagers have access to academic tutoring, group counseling, family therapy.

=== Transitional Housing Project ===
This project is similar to Crisis Prevention Centers. Its purpose is to help older teenagers of age 16-20 who are employed but reluctant to return home due to dysfunctions in parent-child relationships, rebelliousness or other personal and familial conflicts. Under a three-month contract, youth are giving temporary housing, whilst helped to establish self-reliance and a stronger sense of self-identity and what their purpose of life is.

==== Independence Hall (Boys) ====
Independence Hall (Boys) provides transitional housing services to male adolescences aged 15 to 21 years old. The occupants go out for work or study in daytime, and stay in the hall at night. The aim of the Hall is to help teenagers developing a healthy lifestyle to prepare them to stand on their own feet in the future. Each hall operates under a "OIC" duty system in which social workers or staff live together with the teenagers to help them to tackle daily living problems. For more proper care, each teenager is paired with a social worker with the aim of providing individual care and assistance when needed. The hall has a capacity of holding 40 teenagers in total.

A wide range of services are provided in the hall which include occupation and school referral, homework tutoring, individual/family counseling and psychological healing activities.

==== Independence Hall (Girls) ====
It provides girls aged 15–25 with similar services as Independence Hall (Boys).

=== School of Hip Hop ===
The School was established in October 2004 under the principle of using Hip Hop culture, especially Hip Hop dance, as an intervention method to serve young people. The School teaches young people the 4 elements in Hip Hop, including Street Dance, Disc Jockeying, Microphone Controller and Graffiti Writing(Oriental Daily News, 2010). It emphasizes a Hip Hop spirit of mutual respect, creativity, and positive attitude in learning.

The School's objectives are:

1. To raise youngsters' motivation to study or work, resume their studies or take up employment;
2. To build up the self-confidence and the self-image of youngsters;
3. To develop youngsters' potential;
4. To provide youngsters with training in the knowledge and skills off the creative and cultural industries.

In the attempt to broaden the sphere of services, the Schools also provides services to Youth Outreach Women's Homes, anti-drug rehabilitation houses and children with special needs. Often, the School holds performances to the public, including dance, band (music), Graffiti and skating in shopping malls or other public areas.

=== Hong Kong Institute of Youth Studies ===
The institute was established in July 2003, subsidized under the Organization. The institute offers a formal training program with lectures and supervised fieldwork, to students of social work or related disciplines at the undergraduate and graduate level as well as teachers and other workers who are involved in working with young people from the Hong Kong, China, Macau and Taiwan areas. They are trained to serve the marginal adolescents.

During the training program, trainees will live at Youth Outreach (with the accommodation provided by Youth Outreach Training Unit), and have fieldwork under the supervision of qualified social workers and clinical psychologists, attending lectures including theory and practice. Each trainee is assigned to a Mentor who assists the trainee with the practical problems of day to day living in Hong Kong.

The research interest of the institute lies in adolescence related issues. Research reports such as 'Report on Popular Teen Hang-out Spots' and 'Youth Internet Social Life Survey'' have been released.

=== I.T. Development Workshop ===
The I.T. Development Workshop includes courses designed to enhance teenager's computer knowledge and skills and provide practical training and working environment for the teenagers to start their career in the IT field.

Its two main services include:

Webpage Design: Web design training for teenagers to build up their own webpage and subsequently held Small and medium enterprises (SME), as well as Small office/home office (SOHO) to start their business on the internet.

Computer Troubleshoots: Training teenagers on the repairing and inspection of computer systems.

=== Youth Employment Start-up Program (Y.E.S.) ===
The program aims at providing a stable working platform for marginalized youths aged 15 to 24 who neither have skills of any kind, nor acquiring qualifications that help them to hunt for a decent job . Assigning them to the organization's designated workplace, the program helps equip them with basic skills and help them to regain their interest and spirit for work as a stable job can also prevent the marginalized youths from straying on streets all night. Y.E.S. also trains their interpersonal skills in business environment. If progress is seen in their work performance, Youth Outreach would assist them in getting a permanent placement so that they can stand on their own.

The work training platform of Y.E.S. includes:

- 7-Eleven (Kwun Tong & Sai Wan Ho Store): Training in retail industry
- Hair Salon: Hair styling training
- School of Design: Training in marketing and clerical work, or the retail industry
- Restaurant: Training, customer service training in particular, in food and beverages industry
- I.T. Development Workshop: Computer training, web page design and system trouble shooting services

The teenage vocation training center is part of the organization's efforts to provide the 5 million or so youth on the streets with vocational and skill training and connect them with potential employers, in order to enhance their competitiveness in the market.

=== Concorde Psychological Services ===
Concorde Psychological Services is a subunit of Youth Outreach including clinical psychologists, social workers, senior counselors and doctors, dedicated to provide one-stop services to the people concerned about psychological health. Under the main theme of "Care for the youth, families and society" services include:

- Youth service: Helping people cope with various mood and anxiety problems and improve social and interpersonal skills
- Family services: Marital and pre-marital counseling as well as parent skills training targeted at promoting better communication among family members
- Working women service: Providing stress alleviation advice to working women in Hong Kong, teaching them how to balance the load of home and work.
- Individual and community services: Psychological treatment to individuals suffering from various mood and anxiety disorders and community psychological health advocacy

=== Volunteer Services ===
The Youth Outreach currently has 2 volunteer groups: Fire Fly Group (Chinese: 螢火蟲)and Green Friends(Chinese:青知音). The Fire Fly Group was established in 1998 and was originally dedicated to support the Outreaching Team to serve the youth. Volunteers in the group are given first-hand experience in dealing with the problems and needs of youth. Green Friends also acts as a supporting team to help in different activities held by the organization such as Charity Milk Tea Rally 2009. GreenFriends also acts as a supporting team to help in different activities held by the organization such as Charity Milk Tea Rally 2009.

=== Online Services ===
E-shop: It is an on-line bookstore in which publication and souvenirs of the center are sold. Products are mainly related to young adolescents and include titles which help teenagers, including how to tackle common problems and ideas for school teachers to better deal with teenagers.

== Social Enterprise ==
Youth Outreach has established several social enterprises dedicated to provide working and learning opportunities to youngsters in need, while operating their daily business.

=== Youth Outreach Building Management Service ===
This is a vocational training service for youth to gain skills on building and public service facility management in which youth work inside the main headquarters of Youth Outreach. The facilities covered by the youth include inspection and maintenance of all facilities.

=== Co1 Infinity ===
Co1 Infinity (Chinese: Co1設計學校), established in 2001, is a school of creative arts situated in the urban area of Hong Kong and is a social enterprise in collaboration with Youth Outreach. It is aimed especially for young school dropouts, or those who struggle with the pursuit of their academics Youth with potential in the arts are referred to this school which helps them develop their creative future. During March to August every year, the school offers a design employment program which provides opportunities for students at the school to start internships at design companies.

=== 7-ELEVEN ===
7 Eleven is a large convenience chain store which works jointly with Youth Outreach to give youngsters the chance to learn customer service and management skills.

=== Fullness Hair ===
Established in 1986 by a group of church ministries to prevent ex-prison convicts from reverting to their old lifestyles, Fullness Hair (Chinese:豐盛髮廊) today is a non-profit organization which provides professional training in hair dressing and also car repairing services to adolescent drug abusers. At the company, youth are given formal and systematic training and practice are conducted by professional hair stylists so that they can be equipped with basic skills of hair-washing, hair-perm haircut and hair-styling. According to an article in the Hong Kong Economic Journal (2007), daily routine of the youth includes participation in worship and praise sessions before work, and bible study group every Thursday. If interns decide to stay, they are offered subsidies of $2000.

=== mIN+ Cafe & Kitchen ===
mIN+ Cafe & Kitchen (Chinese: 民家餐廳)is a cafe run as a social enterprise. It was established to offer internships to youngsters who are interested in the catering services industry.

=== Arts Alive and Studio 365° ===
The studio (Chinese: 表演藝術到會 全天候創作室) was established to provide performing arts service and internships for talented youth so that those who were struggling with difficulties in their lives could earn their livelihood and pursue their interests in art.

=== City Challenge (Adventure Professionals) ===
City Challenge (Chinese: 城市之峰) was founded in September 2005 under the funding of Rotary Club of Peninsula South. Its program content includes Abseiling, Sport Climbing, and is aimed at promote the vigor of youth as well as physical and psychological growth.

=== School of Hip Hop ===
See School of Hip Hop under Service Units.

=== IT Workshop ===
See IT Workshop under Service Units.

== Overview of Major Events ==
=== Youth Outreach Family Day ===
The Youth Outreach Family Day one of the organization's major annual events and the recent Family Day was held successfully in February 2010. The day is designed for parents and children from the local community to get a taste of activities offered by the organization and also provide a platform for members to share their stories and experiences.

Activities in Youth Outreach Family Day 2010 included: lantern riddles, singing performance, sharing sessions, street hip-hop performance, and center tour.

=== Team Fear - Junior Challenge ===
Team Fear is another major annual event held by Youth Outreach which aims to create opportunity for children aged between 8 and 18 team up and participate in an Adventure Race worldwide. The events are designed specifically for the young participants and focus on safety issues that youth might encounter in their daily lives.

== Organization updates ==
=== OLE courses ===
In response to the new academic structure 334 Scheme announced by the Education Bureau in the past few years, Youth Outreach's deputy executive director, Ben Chan (Chinese:陳達湘), expressed interest in providing OLE (Other Learning Experiences) courses to interested schools. The new course covers graffiti, drums, hip hop, musical instruments and dancing in order to broaden the extracurricular profile of youth and decrease their chances of finding fun in risky behaviour such as joining triads and drug abuse.

== Research Publications ==
Aside from newsletters, articles, annual reports and HangOut publications, the organization works alongside The Hong Kong Institute of Youth Studies to produce research reports on certain youth problems.

- "Youth Outreach" - Crisis Intervention With Marginal Adolescents(1993)):

It was found that most of the runaway population were from relatively low income suburban areas and public housing estates such as Tai Po, Yuen Long or Tuen Mun. Negative family and school environment constitute were among the two largest triggers for youth to wander on the streets. The study cautioned that marginal adolescents are prone to many risks such as premature and unsafe sexual activity and the infection of sexually transmitted diseases such as AIDS.

- Good peers, Bad peers - Survey report on teenager drug abuse (2009)

This survey was conducted on children aged 6 to 25.It was found that over 70% of respondents in the survey were youth who spent their nights on the streets, and 4 out of 10 youth would be prone to drug abuse. Implications of this research are that to solve the problems of drug abuse, social workers first need to focus on combating the frustrations, peer pressures, and rebelliousness harboring inside the teenagers.

- Internet social life survey (2008):

Conducted together with Hong Kong Institute of Youth Studies, the survey interviewed 184 teenagers aged between 13 and 18 on their internet lifestyle including online dating, friendship networks and found that more than 87% of teenagers befriend people of the opposite sex via the internet, and that over 72% of youth would participate in sexual activity upon meeting with their date. The survey suggests that internet dating and subsequent unsafe sexual activity poses psychological and mental damages to teenagers.

- Top 10 Teenage Hangout Places Survey Analysis (2006):

Owing to lack of research on the night behavior and leisure behavior of teenagers in Hong Kong, Youth Outreach conducted a survey aimed to find out the top ten most common hangout sites for youth in order to further improve their services accordingly. Findings indicated that Mong Kok, Causeway Bay and Tsim Tsa Tsui attracted most youth, whilst the variety of shops in shopping malls make it the most ideal place for youth to 'hangout' in.

- Teenagers' night activity survey (2007)----Youth addicted to internet bar and stay outdoors late:

As Hong Kong has many youth stay overnight in Internet bars and many stay overnight, Youth Outreach conducted a questionnaire survey to understand the young group, their entertainment model in order to explore the interests and habits of the young night drifters. Results confirmed the growing trend of youth in internet bars is due to social pressures and feelings of excitement.

== Funding (2005) ==
Youth Outreach spends around 400 million HK Dollars on services and other additional expenses, and as it is a non-governmental organization, most of the funding comes from private donors and the business sectors although the government also has provided support to this registered charity. Up until 2005, the organization has received around $19,421,527 of donations and grants

== Awards and Criticisms ==
Youth Outreach holds the 'Worker for Peace' (Servitor Pacis) award in its dedication to helping Hong Kong teenagers on the streets

In 2009, the organization received recognition by Hong Kong Eastern District councilor Chong Shu Kan for its efforts in combating district teenage drug abuse, outreaching to 30,000 teenagers with such problems in the past year (Ming Pao Daily, 2009)

There has however been concerns about the arrangement of transitional housing. According to Apply Daily, in 2008, an incident of injuries caused by a fight between two male tenants at the housing, who were aged 15 and 8 respectively, over video game playing led to minor public criticism of the organization's lack of consideration of possible conflicts due to the wide age gap of transitional housing residents.
