= Lavender Creek =

Stream in Georgia

Coordinates: 34°22′37.32″N 85°10′48.82″W

Lavender Creek is a stream in the U.S. state of Georgia. It is a tributary to Armuchee Creek.

Lavender Creek was named after George Michael Lavender, a local merchant.
