= Chris Patten =

British politician (born 1944)

The Right Honourable The Lord Patten of Barnes KG CH PC
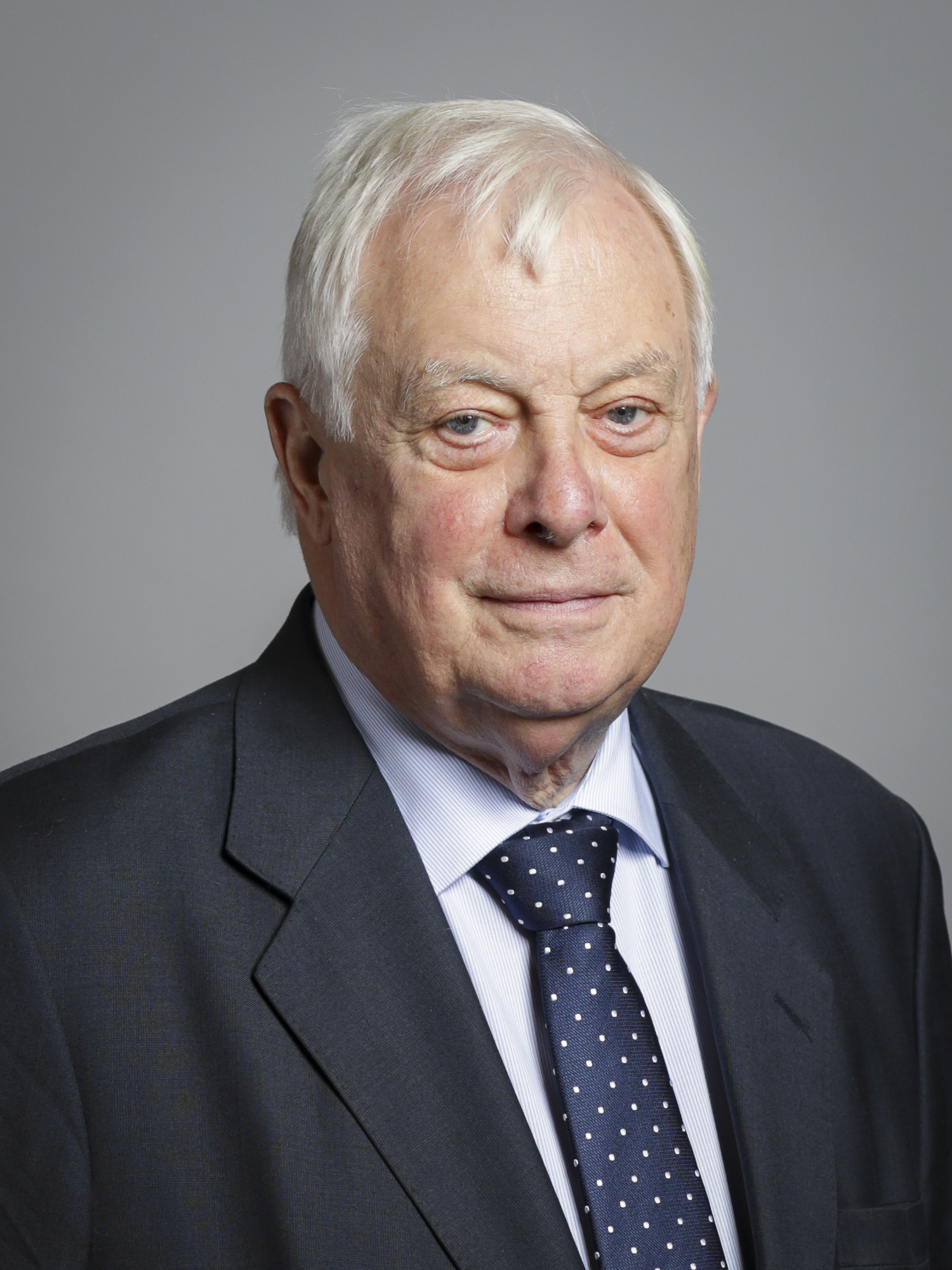
- Official portrait, 2019

Chancellor of the University of Oxford
- In office 20 September 2003 – 31 July 2024
- Vice-Chancellor: Sir Colin Lucas; Sir John Hood; Andrew D. Hamilton; Louise Richardson; Irene Tracey
- Preceded by: Roy Jenkins
- Succeeded by: William Hague

European Commissioner for External Relations
- In office 16 September 1999 – 22 November 2004
- Nominated by: Tony Blair
- President: Romano Prodi; José Manuel Barroso
- Preceded by: Leon Brittan
- Succeeded by: Benita Ferrero-Waldner

28th Governor of Hong Kong
- In office 9 July 1992 – 30 June 1997
- Monarch: Elizabeth II
- Chief Secretary: Sir David Ford; Anson Chan
- Preceded by: David Wilson
- Succeeded by: Office abolished Tung Chee-hwa (as Chief Executive of Hong Kong)

Chairman of the Conservative Party
- In office 28 November 1990 – 11 May 1992
- Leader: John Major
- Preceded by: Kenneth Baker
- Succeeded by: Norman Fowler
Ministerial offices
Chancellor of the Duchy of Lancaster
In office 28 November 1990 – 10 April 1992
| Prime Minister | John Major |
| Preceded by | Kenneth Baker |
| Succeeded by | William Waldegrave |
Secretary of State for the Environment
In office 24 July 1989 – 28 November 1990
| Prime Minister | Margaret Thatcher |
| Preceded by | Nicholas Ridley |
| Succeeded by | Michael Heseltine |
Minister for Overseas Development
In office 10 September 1986 – 24 July 1989
| Prime Minister | Margaret Thatcher |
| Preceded by | Timothy Raison |
| Succeeded by | Lynda Chalker |
Parliamentary offices
Member of the House of Lords
Lord Temporal
Life peerage 11 January 2005
President of the Legislative Council of Hong Kong
In office 9 July 1992 – 19 February 1993
| Monarch | Elizabeth II |
| Deputy | Sir John Joseph Swaine |
| Preceded by | David Wilson |
| Succeeded by | Sir John Joseph Swaine |
Member of Parliament for Bath
In office 3 May 1979 – 16 March 1992
| Preceded by | Edward Brown |
| Succeeded by | Don Foster |
Academic positions
Chancellor of Newcastle University
In office 5 October 1999 – 5 October 2009
| Vice Chancellor | James Wright; Christopher Edwards; Chris Brink |
| Preceded by | Matthew White Ridley |
| Succeeded by | Liam Donaldson |

Chairman of the BBC Trust
- In office 1 May 2011 – 6 May 2014
- Preceded by: Sir Michael Lyons
- Succeeded by: Diane Coyle (acting); Rona Fairhead, Baroness Fairhead

Personal details
- Born: Christopher Francis Patten; 12 May 1944 (age 82) Cleveleys, Lancashire, England
- Party: Conservative
- Spouse: Lavender Thornton (m. 1971)
- Children: 3, including Alice
- Education: Balliol College, Oxford (BA)
- Awards: Order of the Companions of Honour (1998); Commander of the Legion of Honour (2016); Order of the Garter (2023)

Chinese name
- Chinese: 彭定康
Transcriptions
Standard Mandarin
- Hanyu Pinyin: Péng Dìngkāng
Yue: Cantonese
- Yale Romanization: paang4 ding6 hong1
- Jyutping: paang4 ding6 hong1

Christopher Francis Patten, Baron Patten of Barnes (Note: Chinese: 彭定康; pinyin: Péng Dìngkāng) (born 12 May 1944), is a British politician who was the Chairman of the Conservative Party from 1990 to 1992, and the 28th and last Governor of Hong Kong from 1992 to 1997. He was made a life peer in 2005 and served as Chancellor of the University of Oxford from 2003 to 2024. He is one of the two living former governors of Hong Kong; the other is David Wilson.

Patten was born in Thornton-Cleveleys in Lancashire and subsequently raised in west London. He studied history at Balliol College, Oxford, and, after graduating in 1965, he began working for the Conservative Party.

Patten was elected Member of Parliament for Bath in 1979. He was appointed Secretary of State for the Environment by Margaret Thatcher in 1989 as part of her third ministry, becoming responsible for implementation of the unpopular poll tax. On John Major's succession as Prime Minister in 1990, Patten became Chairman of the Conservative Party and Chancellor of the Duchy of Lancaster. As party chairman, he successfully orchestrated a surprise Conservative electoral victory in 1992, but lost his own seat.

Patten was then appointed the last governor of Hong Kong, to oversee the final years of British administration in the colony and prepare for its transfer to China in 1997. During his tenure, his government significantly expanded the territory's social welfare programmes and introduced democratic reforms to the electoral system.

Following his governorship, Patten led the Independent Commission on Policing for Northern Ireland, a major implementation step of the Northern Ireland peace process pursuant to the Good Friday Agreement from 1998 to 1999. He was European Commissioner for External Relations from 1999 to 2004 and Chairman of the BBC Trust from 2011 to 2014.

== Early life and education ==
Patten was born in Thornton-Cleveleys in Lancashire, where his mother had fled to from Exeter, which had recently been significantly damaged by the Baedeker raids. Patten grew up in an Irish Catholic family in west London, the son of an unsuccessful music publisher whose ancestors had come to England from County Roscommon, Ireland. Patten's father, Frank, dropped out of university to become a jazz drummer, and later a publisher of popular music. Frank and his mother Joan sent him to a Catholic primary school, Our Lady of the Visitation, in Greenford, and later awarded a scholarship to the independent St Benedict's School in Ealing, west London, where he won an exhibition to read Modern History at Balliol College, Oxford.

After graduating with a second-class honours degree in 1965 and winning a William Coolidge Pathfinder Award travelling scholarship to the US, Patten worked for the campaign of then-Republican New York Mayor John Lindsay, where he reported on the television performance of rival William F. Buckley Jr. He worked for the Conservative Party from 1966, first as desk officer and then director (from 1974 to 1979) of the Conservative Research Department.

== Member of Parliament: 1979–1992 ==
Patten was the Conservative Party candidate for Lambeth Central at the February 1974 general election, but lost to the Labour Party candidate, Marcus Lipton. He was elected as the Member of Parliament for Bath in 1979, and served until he was unseated in 1992.

=== In government ===
Patten was appointed Parliamentary Under-Secretary for the Northern Ireland Office in June 1983. He was promoted to be a Minister of State in the Department of Education and Science in September 1985, and was named Minister for Overseas Development at the Foreign and Commonwealth Office in September 1986.

In 1989, he was promoted to the Cabinet as Secretary of State for the Environment and became responsible for the unpopular Community Charge (or so-called "Poll Tax"). Though he robustly defended the policy at the time, in his 2006 book Not Quite the Diplomat (published in the United States as Cousins and Strangers: America, Britain and Europe in the New Century) he claims to have thought it was a mistake on Margaret Thatcher's part. He also introduced, and steered through Parliament, the major legislation that became the Environmental Protection Act 1990.

In 1990, John Major made Patten Chancellor of the Duchy of Lancaster and Chairman of the Conservative Party, with responsibility for organising the Conservative Party's re-election campaign for the upcoming general election. As party chairman, he was widely considered to be the main architect of the somewhat unexpected Conservative victory at the 1992 general election. However, he lost his marginal seat of Bath to the Liberal Democrat candidate Don Foster at that election. Patten's defeat was attributed to factors such as the Poll Tax.

== Governor of Hong Kong: 1992–1997 ==
Viceregal styles of Christopher Patten (1992–1997)
- Reference style: His Excellency the Right Honourable
- Spoken style: Your Excellency

If Patten had been re-elected in 1992, sections of the media thought he would have been rewarded by appointment as Foreign Secretary, although in his autobiography John Major said that he would have made Patten Chancellor of the Exchequer.

Patten turned down offers of a new post and instead, in July 1992, he became the 28th and the last governor of Hong Kong until its transfer of sovereignty to China on 30 June 1997. He was given an official Chinese name, Pang Ting-hong (Chinese: 彭定康), a name with an etymology based on the words "stability" and "calm; joyous; healthy". Unlike most previous Hong Kong governors, he was not a career diplomat from the UK Foreign Office although he was not the first former MP to become a governor of Hong Kong.

Patten meeting U.S. President Bill Clinton at the White House in 1993

Patten's tenure faced several different challenges, as many in Hong Kong were still reeling from the Tiananmen Square massacre a few years earlier. However the general public regarded him positively. He took steps to get in touch with the people of the colony, and was known for his penchant for taking public strolls around Hong Kong as well as in the media limelight. Hongkongers nicknamed him Fat Pang (Chinese: 肥彭), making him the only governor to have a widely recognised Chinese nickname.

In contrast to his predecessors, Patten decided not to wear the official Court uniform on formal occasions. Patten's approval rating in Hong Kong in April 1992 was 53% and ended his tenure with an approval rating of 59.7%.

Patten's most controversial actions in Hong Kong are related to the 1994 electoral reform. LegCo members returned in 1995 were originally to serve beyond the Handover, thereby providing institutional continuity across the transition of Hong Kong to the PRC. Beijing had expected that the use of functional constituencies with limited electorates would be used to elect this council, however Patten extended the definition of functional constituencies and thus virtually every Hong Konger was able to vote for the so-called indirectly elected members (see Politics of Hong Kong) of the Legislative Council.

The Legislative Council became a fully elected legislature for the first time in 1995 and extensively expanded its functions and organisations throughout the last years of colonial rule.

Patten's actions were strongly criticised by the pro-Beijing political parties of Hong Kong. Patten was also denounced by some Chinese media and politicians as the "whore of the East" and a "serpent", and was most famously called a "sinner who would be condemned for a thousand generations" (Chinese: 千古罪人) by Lu Ping, the head of China's Hong Kong and Macau Affairs Office. The legislative council which was elected under Patten's governorship was dissolved upon the handover of Hong Kong to the PRC and replaced by a Provisional Legislative Council which did not have any democratic functions until elections were held under the previous rules in 1998.

At midnight Hong Kong Time 1 July 1997 (16:00 GMT, 30 June 1997), he sent the telegram: "I have relinquished the administration of this government. God Save The Queen. Patten." This marked the end of British rule in Hong Kong. After the handover ceremony he left the city, together with Prince Charles, on board the British royal yacht, HMY Britannia. Patten was noted to be in tears throughout the day, notably after his speech at Tamar. He has since commented that his governorship of Hong Kong was a happy time for him personally as he shared this experience with his wife and children.

=== Patten government ===
| Portfolio | Minister | Took office | Left office | Party |
|---|---|---|---|---|
| Governor | Chris Patten | 9 July 1992 | 30 June 1997 | Conservative |
| Chief Secretary | David Ford | 12 February 1987 | 28 November 1993 | Nonpartisan |
| Chief Secretary | Anson Chan | 29 November 1993 | Tung I | Nonpartisan |
| Financial Secretary | Hamish Macleod | 12 August 1991 | 31 August 1995 | Nonpartisan |
| Financial Secretary | Donald Tsang | 1 September 1995 | Tung I | Nonpartisan |
| Attorney General | Jeremy Mathews | 1 April 1988 | 30 June 1997 | Nonpartisan |
| Secretary for Broadcasting, Culture and Sport | James So | 8 June 1991 | November 1995 | Nonpartisan |
| Secretary for Broadcasting, Culture and Sport | Brian Chau | 20 November 1995 | Tung I | Nonpartisan |
| Secretary for the Civil Service | Barrie Wiggham | April 1990 | April 1993 | Nonpartisan |
| Secretary for the Civil Service | Anson Chan | 19 April 1993 | October 1993 | Nonpartisan |
| Secretary for the Civil Service | Michael Sze | 1 February 1994 | 11 February 1996 | Nonpartisan |
| Secretary for the Civil Service | Lam Woon-kwong | 12 February 1996 | Tung I | Nonpartisan |
| Secretary for Trade and Industry | Chau Tak-hay | 20 May 1991 | November 1995 | Nonpartisan |
| Secretary for Trade and Industry | Denise Yue | November 1995 | Tung I | Nonpartisan |
| Secretary for Constitutional Affairs | Michael Sze | 30 October 1991 | 27 January 1994 | Nonpartisan |
| Secretary for Constitutional Affairs | Nicholas Ng | 28 January 1994 | Tung I | Nonpartisan |
| Secretary for Economic Services | Anson Chan | 23 March 1987 | April 1993 | Nonpartisan |
| Secretary for Economic Services | Gordon Siu | 28 April 1993 | June 1996 | Nonpartisan |
| Secretary for Economic Services | Stephen Ip | June 1996 | Tung I | Nonpartisan |
| Secretary for Education and Manpower | John Chan | 1991 | 1993 | Nonpartisan |
| Secretary for Education and Manpower | Leung Man-kin | October 1984 | January 1987 | Nonpartisan |
| Secretary for Education and Manpower | Joseph Wong | August 1995 | Tung I | Nonpartisan |
| Secretary for Planning, Environment and Lands | Anthony Gordon Eason | 1 April 1992 | May 1995 | Nonpartisan |
| Secretary for Planning, Environment and Lands | Bowen Leung | 15 May 1995 | Tung I | Nonpartisan |
| Secretary for Financial Services; Secretary for Monetary Affairs before April 1993 | Michael David Cartland | January 1993 | 1995 | Nonpartisan |
| Secretary for Financial Services; Secretary for Monetary Affairs before April 1993 | Rafael Hui | 4 September 1995 | Tung I | Nonpartisan |
| Secretary for Health and Welfare | Elizabeth Wong | January 1990 | September 1994 | Nonpartisan |
| Secretary for Health and Welfare | Katherine Fok | September 1994 | Tung I | Nonpartisan |
| Secretary for Home Affairs | Michael Suen | 7 November 1991 | Tung I | Nonpartisan |
| Secretary for Housing | Dominic Wong | 15 December 1994 | Tung I | Nonpartisan |
| Secretary for Security | Alistair Asprey | February 1990 | February 1995 | Nonpartisan |
| Secretary for Security | Peter Lai | February 1995 | Tung I | Nonpartisan |
| Secretary for Transport | Michael Leung | 9 February 1987 | May 1993 | Nonpartisan |
| Secretary for Transport | Yeung Kai-yin | June 1993 | September 1993 | Nonpartisan |
| Secretary for Transport | Haider Barma | October 1993 | June 1996 | Nonpartisan |
| Secretary for Transport | Gordon Siu | June 1996 | Tung I | Nonpartisan |
| Secretary for the Treasury | Yeung Kai-yin | 2 May 1991 | 6 May 1993 | Nonpartisan |
| Secretary for the Treasury | Donald Tsang | 7 May 1993 | 31 March 1995 | Nonpartisan |
| Secretary for the Treasury | Kwong Ki-chi | 1 April 1995 | Tung I | Nonpartisan |
| Secretary for Works | Ronald James Blake | 1 April 1992 | May 1995 | Nonpartisan |
| Secretary for Works | Kwong Hon-sang | 15 May 1995 | Tung I | Nonpartisan |

== After the governorship ==
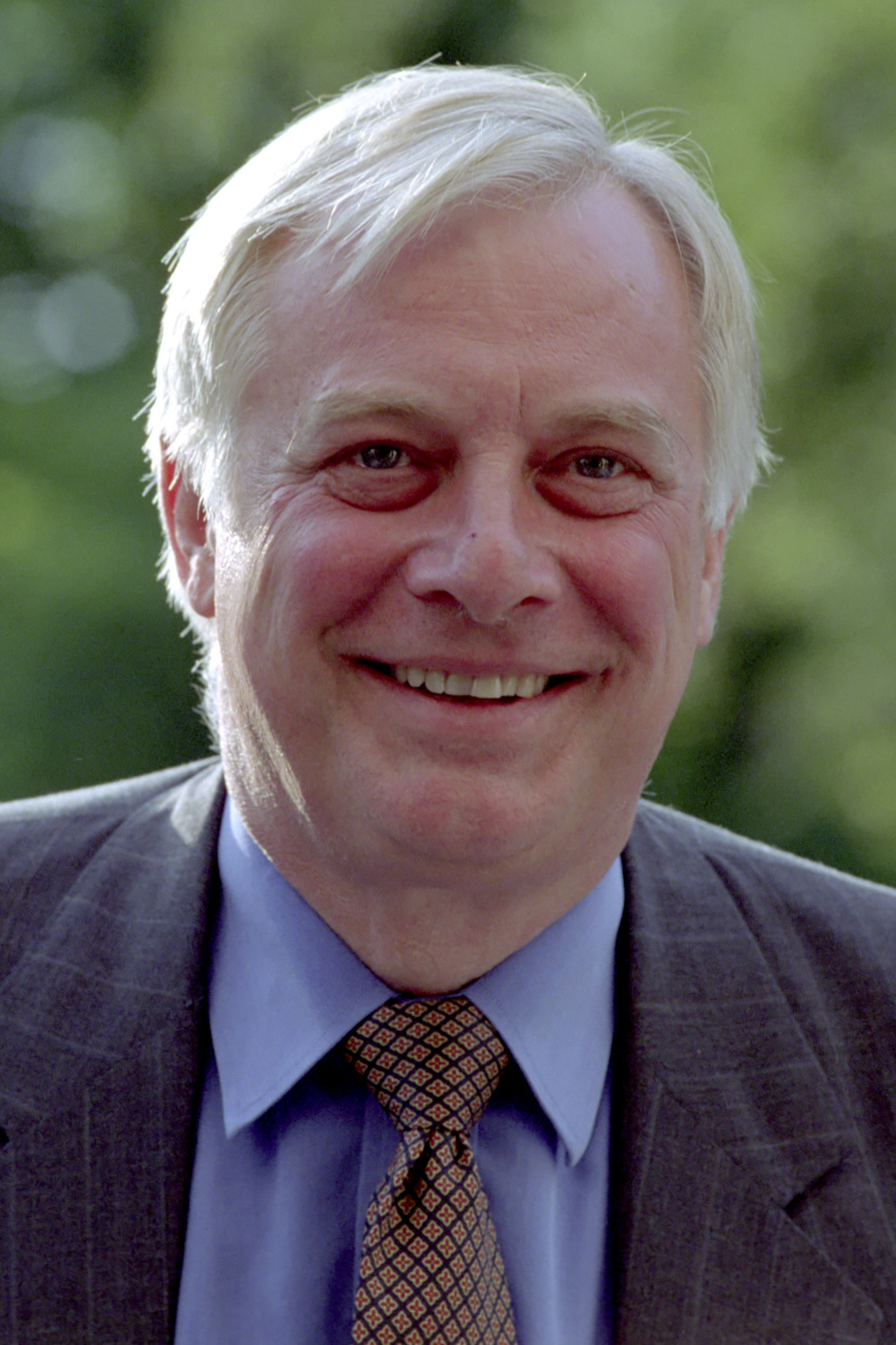
Patten in 1999

From 1998 to 1999, he chaired the Independent Commission on Policing for Northern Ireland, better known as the Patten Commission, which had been established in 1998 as part of the Belfast Agreement. On 9 September 1999, the Commission produced its report, entitled A New Beginning: Policing in Northern Ireland and popularly known as the Patten Report, which contained 175 symbolic and practical recommendations. This report led to the disbanding of the Royal Ulster Constabulary and establishment of the Police Service of Northern Ireland. He is the co-chair of International Crisis Group, overseeing many international operations. He is also a member of the Global Leadership Foundation, an organisation which works to promote good governance around the world. On 23 May 2005 he was appointed by Cadbury as a non-executive director.

=== European Commissioner: 1999–2004 ===
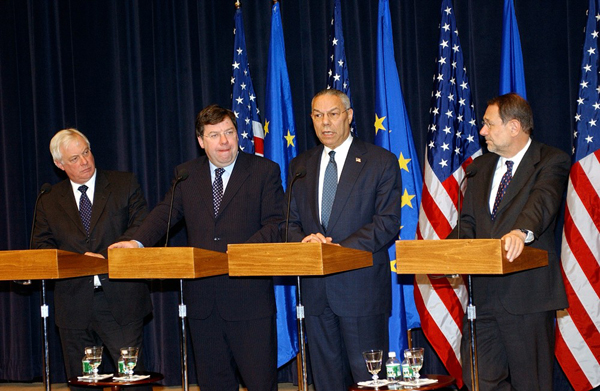
Patten (left) with Brian Cowen, Colin Powell and Javier Solana in March 2004

In 1999, he was appointed as one of the United Kingdom's two members to the European Commission as Commissioner for External Relations where he was responsible for the Union's development and co-operation programmes, as well as liaison with Javier Solana, the High Representative of the Common Foreign and Security Policy. He held this position within the Prodi Commission from 23 January 2000 until 22 November 2004. Patten oversaw many crises in the area of European foreign policy, most notably the failure of the European Union to come up with a common unified policy before the Iraq War in 2003. Although nominated for the post of President in the next Commission in 2004, he was unable to gain support from France and Germany.

According to information from WikiLeaks, Patten was in Moscow in April 2004 and had concluded EU–Russia ministerial consultations in Brussels. He considered that the EU had become overly dependent on Russian energy supplies, and should become more engaged with the countries of the Caucasus and Central Asia in order to diversify supplies.

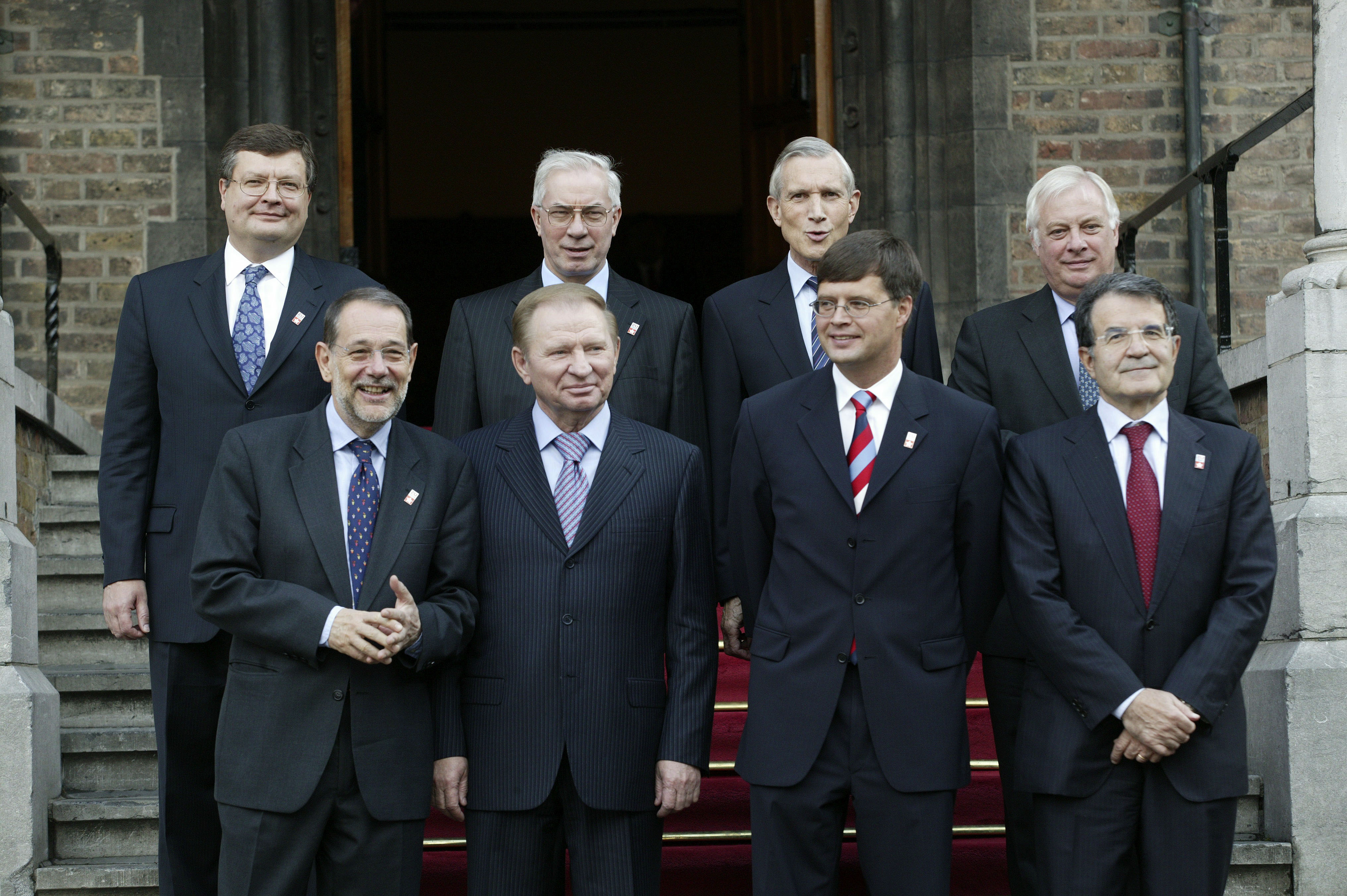
From left to right: Kostyantyn Gryshchenko, Mykola Azarov, Bernard Bot, Patten; Javier Solana, Leonid Kuchma, Jan Peter Balkenende & Romano Prodi (2004)

Patten was the biggest proponent in the commission for Turkey's accession to the European Union.

According to information from the US Embassy in Brussels (published by WikiLeaks in November 2010): Patten said in April 2004 that Russian President Vladimir Putin has done a good job for Russia mainly due to high world energy prices, but he had serious doubts about the man's character. Cautioning that "I'm not saying that genes are determinant," Patten then reviewed the Putin family history – grandfather part of Lenin's special protection team; father a communist party apparatchik, and Putin himself decided at a young age to pursue a career in the KGB. "He seems a completely reasonable man when discussing the Middle East or energy policy, but when the conversation shifts to Chechnya or Islamic extremism, Putin's eyes turn to those of a killer."

=== University roles and elevation to the peerage ===
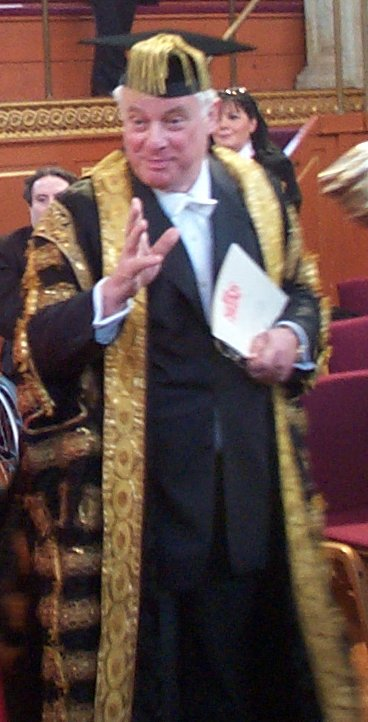
Patten in ceremonial dress as the Chancellor of the University of Oxford

Patten was Chancellor of Newcastle University from 1999 to 2009. In 2003, he was elected Chancellor of the University of Oxford.

In 2016, in the wake of a student movement to remove the statue of Cecil Rhodes from a college in Oxford, as had happened in South Africa, Patten said that Oxford students who were not "prepared to show the generosity of spirit which Nelson Mandela showed towards Rhodes and towards history ... should think about being educated elsewhere".

Patten retired as chancellor of the University of Oxford on 31 July 2024, ahead of his 80th birthday and after 21 years in post. The election of his successor (William Hague), to a ten-year term, was scheduled to take place in late October and early November.

On 11 January 2005 Patten was created a life peer as Baron Patten of Barnes, of Barnes in the London Borough of Richmond.

=== Chairman of the BBC Trust: 2011–2014 ===
On the advice of the Conservative–Liberal Democrat coalition government led by Prime Minister David Cameron, Patten was appointed by the Queen-in-Council as Chairman of the BBC Trust, and he took office on 1 May 2011, in the place of Sir Michael Lyons whose contract was not renewed. During this time, Patten sat as a crossbencher.

==== BBC royal river pageant outside broadcast ====
As Chairman of the BBC Trust, Patten joined the Prince of Wales and other members of the royal family in the royal box for the Queen's Diamond Jubilee Concert. It came, however, immediately in the wake of widespread criticism of the BBC's live outside-broadcast coverage of the Queen's Diamond Jubilee River Pageant on 3 June 2012, which was castigated in the press and was the subject of 1,830 formal complaints by viewers. Patten said afterwards the Royal Pageant had not been the BBC's "finest hour" and admitted that "The tone was wrong."

==== Resignation ====
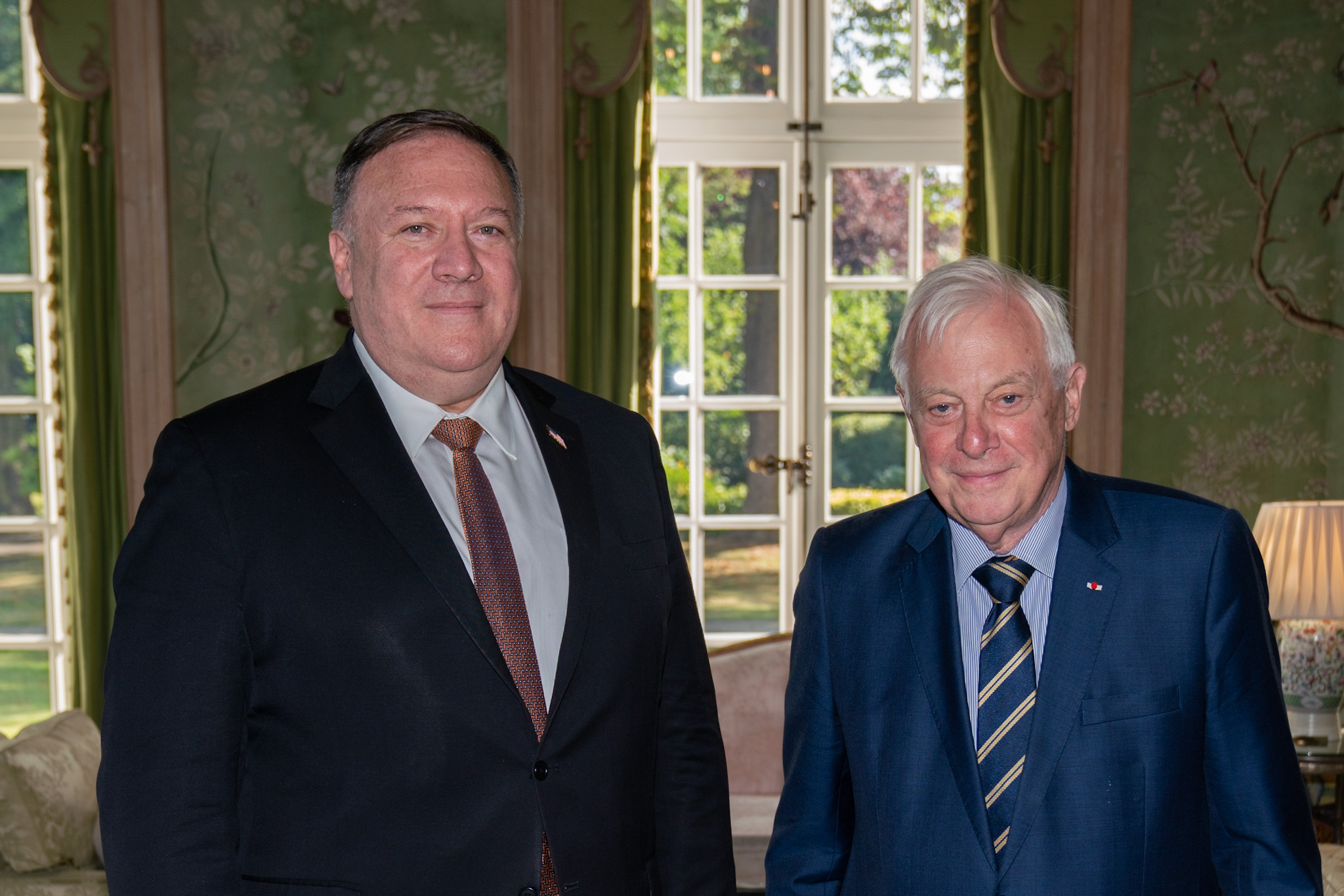
Patten (right) with U.S. Secretary of State Mike Pompeo in July 2020

Patten submitted his letter of resignation as BBC Trust Chairman to the Secretary of State on 6 May 2014, citing health reasons following his heart bypass surgery on 28 April. BBC Trust Vice Chairman Diane Coyle took over as Acting Chairman until the appointment of a new chairman. He returned to sit with the Conservative Party in the House of Lords in September of that year.

In May 2016, Patten said that the BBC had "lost some of its ambition" in its coverage of science, philosophy and history, and should "stretch" audiences more. Patten bemoaned the fact that much of the corporation's high-brow programming had been moved to BBC Four, the digital channel, and given low budgets that meant shows were "sometimes made with glue and string". In a speech on the future of the BBC, which he said was "one of this country's greatest institutions", Patten called on ministers to respect the "besieged" broadcaster's independence, and set in place measures to stop it becoming "the plaything of the government of the day".

=== On China ===
In September 2020, he wrote that "Chinese Communist Party general secretary Xi Jinping's dictatorship is certainly thuggish. Consider its policies in Xinjiang. Many international lawyers argue that the incarceration of over one million Muslim Uyghurs, forced sterilisation and abortion, and slave labour meet the UN definition of genocide." Patten said that Chinese company Huawei "is an agent of an unpleasant Chinese state."

In May 2020, Patten said that there was a case for a multilateral mission to travel to Wuhan to investigate the origins of the COVID-19 outbreak. He argued the Chinese government had breached its obligations as a member of the World Health Organization and the 2005 International Health Regulations treaty. He also added that Britain and other countries were not against the Chinese nation or people, praising China's medical workers who first responded to the virus, but stated "It is our relationship with the dangerous and immoral Communist Party. In Wuhan the Communist party used the police to try and shut the doctors up. Totalitarian regimes always rely on secrecy and mendacity."

=== On Hong Kong ===
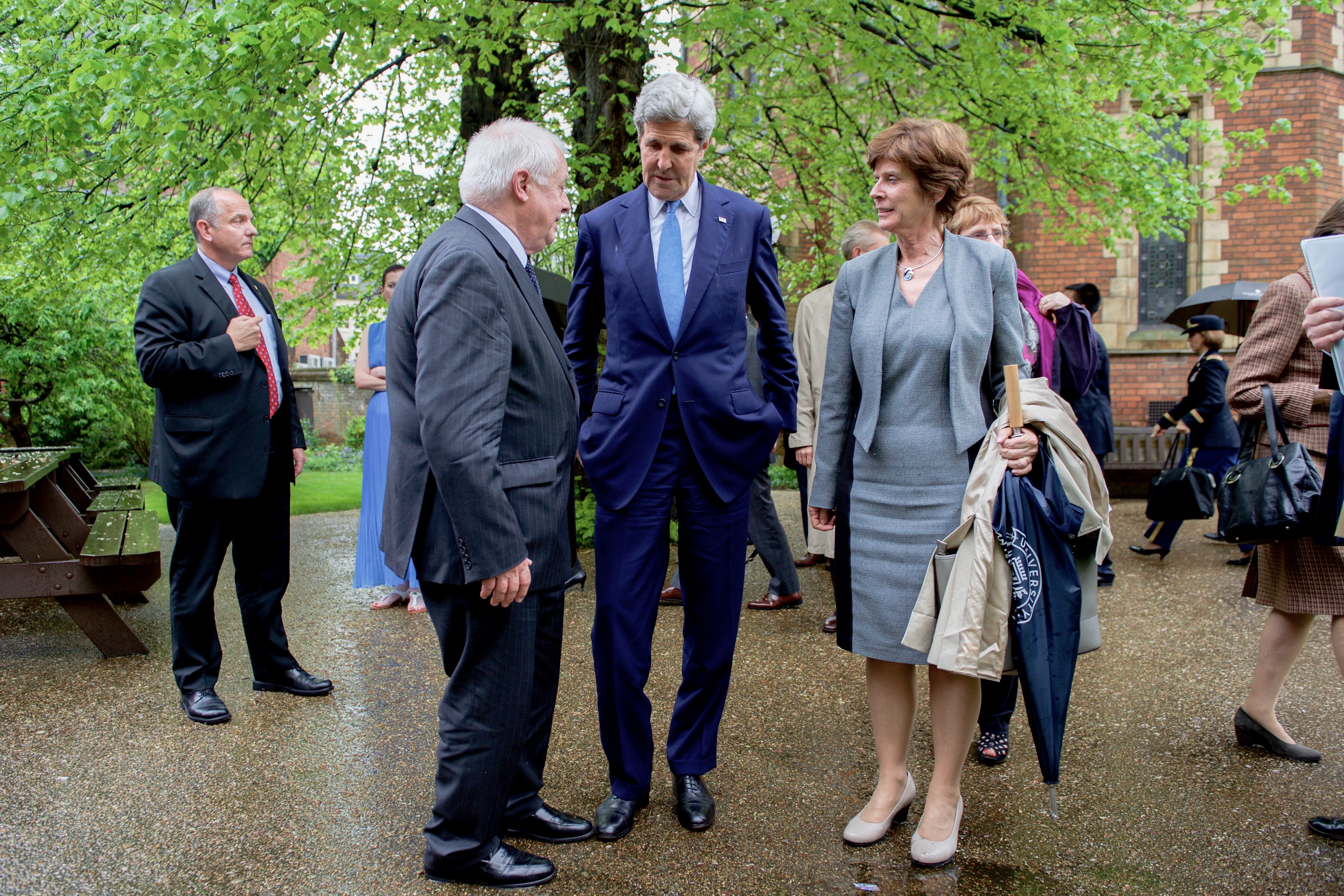
Patten with John Kerry (2016)

In the initial years after his tenure as Governor of Hong Kong ended Patten, by his own admission, chose not to directly comment on Hong Kong's affairs but in recent years has increasingly shared his views on Hong Kong in public talks and press interviews since the handover.

During an interview with The Wall Street Journal in 2013, he expressed the belief the Government of the Hong Kong Special Administrative Region would inevitably give citizens a greater say in public policy. He argued "You can't just give citizens the right to decide on economic and social policies, but on the other hand, you can't allow them to decide who will clean up the garbage, how their children will be educated, and how the health care policy will be implemented" and "anyone who tries to block the development of democracy will only be spitting in the wind." He reiterated that the Sino-British Joint Declaration stipulated that Hong Kong and the United Kingdom need to maintain economic and cultural ties, emphasising that "the United Kingdom has this interest and responsibility, and we must never forget it."

On March 20, 2014, Patten gave a talk at the Hong Kong Maritime Museum co-organised by Oxford University where he expressed his views on Hong Kong Basic Law and the "one country, two systems" principle. He opined that the situation in Hong Kong was good but not perfect but believed that the British people could have done more for political reform before leaving Hong Kong. He emphasised that political and economic freedoms are closely linked, and that when one freedom is eroded, the other will be affected.

In July 2014, Patten criticised The Practice of the 'One Country, Two Systems' Policy in the Hong Kong Special Administrative Region white paper issued by the People's Republic of China for interfering with Hong Kong's judicial independence. In an interview with the Financial Times, he stated "In a system of rule of law, judges are independent and should not be questioned for instructions or forced to abandon their views on procedural fairness and what is legal due to certain political considerations." Patten also added that the Sino-British Joint Declaration signed that year was an international agreement between China and the United Kingdom, which guaranteed that Hong Kong would remain unchanged for 50 years, including the freedoms and civil liberties enjoyed by Hong Kong people. He said that if Hong Kongers believe that the Sino-British Joint Declaration has been undermined, it is completely reasonable to express concerns to China and Britain and lodge a peaceful protest.

In a 2014 article for the Financial Times, Patten argued the British government should not stay silent on China interfering with Hong Kong's judiciary and politics, arguing that the UK had a moral and political responsibility to speak out on the issue of universal suffrage in Hong Kong and ensure that China fulfilled its promises in the Sino-British Joint Declaration, reiterating that the agreement was international. The Chinese government had criticised Britain in harsh terms for interfering in China's internal affairs and Hong Kong's political reform, but Patten stressed that the UK should not fear economic consequences for speaking out against China as Britain was also obligated to ensure the Joint Declaration was respected and that China itself would suffer economic repercussions if it cut ties with the West.

While commenting on the Umbrella Revolution protests in 2014, Patten called on the SAR government to conduct real consultation on political reform issues and engage in dialogue with the protestors. He also criticised the Beijing government for reneging on its promise to allow Hong Kong autonomy. Despite condemning actions undertaken by the Chinese authorities and Hong Kong police, he expressed the view that a Chinese invasion of Hong Kong and a Tiananmen Square-style crackdown would not happen because the Chinese government is concerned about its relations with other countries and its international image.

In November 2014, Patten gave evidence to a hearing of the Foreign Affairs Select Committee on the implementation of the "Sino-British Joint Declaration" in Hong Kong. Patten said that the Hong Kong Police Force is one of the top police forces in the world, but they had become a basis for politics. Patten argued that Hong Kong's problem is a serious lack of leadership and the chief executive and the SAR government have the ability to pressure and convince demonstrators to negotiate, temporarily end protest, and return to school or work. Citing words by Joshua Wong, Patten believed that young Hong Kong people are afraid of having their future stolen.

In June 2015, Chris Patten was interviewed by Hong Kong newspaper Apple Daily. He expressed the belief that even if a political reform plan is rejected, Hong Kong's democracy will not reach a dead end and was confident that Hong Kong will one day have democracy.

In 2016, Patten expressed opposition to hypothetical Hong Kong independence, arguing such a move "dilutes support for democracy" and that moves towards universal suffrage in Hong Kong should not be conflated with independence.

Patten undertook a tour of Hong Kong in November 2016 where gave a public lecture at the Foreign Correspondents' Club and later spoke at a student forum organised by the University of Hong Kong. He emphasised that the cornerstone of Hong Kong's success lies in the rule of law, which is guaranteed by the Sino-British Joint Declaration. He also addressed the Causeway Bay Books disappearances, saying he was saddened such an incident had happened in Hong Kong and asked why the international community paid so little attention. He did not directly comment on the performance of Chief Executive Leung Chun-ying, but argued Hong Kong's Chief Executive should face Beijing on behalf of Hong Kong people, not Hong Kong people on behalf of Beijing.

In a 2017 interview with BBC's Newsnight Patten expressed regret that many Hong Kong people do not feel that Britain has ever truly stood up for its commitments and responsibilities but also criticised the idea that Britain was "kowtowing to China" politically for the sake of trade. He argued that during the last ten to fifteen years of British rule in Hong Kong, more democracy should have been promoted and that if Hong Kong had more years of democratic experience, it would be more difficult for the Chinese government to reverse Hong Kong's democratic process and all Hong Kongers would have openly noticed any democratic backsliding.

In 2020, he criticised the new Hong Kong national security law as an "outrageous act" and accused the Chinese Communist Party of seeking to "destroy" Hong Kong. He also said the British government should not see trade as a reason to avoid condemning the law and demand that China respect its end of the Joint Declaration, stating "we keep on kidding ourselves that unless we do everything that China wants we will somehow miss out on great trading opportunities. It's drivel."

In a July 2020 interview with CNBC, he referred to Hong Kong Chief Executive Carrie Lam as a "lamentable and quisling figure in Hong Kong history" for her handling of the political crisis in Hong Kong which led to the national security law, which Patten argued undermined Hong Kong's independence judiciary and political freedoms.

In a 2022 interview with London-based Hong Kong YouTube channel Green Bean Media Patten expressed that he was angry and sad about the current situation in Hong Kong. He said "Hong Kong should have been an extraordinary place, but we saw it destroyed by a brutal ideology and a group of traitors" and described the situation as "very frustrating." He also praised Hong Kong citizens who immigrated to the UK for their contributions to British life.

In March 2023, Patten was one of 47 British lawmakers to sign an open letter urging the Hong Kong authorities to release Claudia Mo on humanitarian grounds to visit her critically ill husband in hospital.

=== On Northern Ireland ===
Patten contributed to post-conflict reform in Northern Ireland, most notably as the architect of the Patten Report which laid the foundation for modernising the region's policing service following the Good Friday Agreement. Appointed to lead the Independent Commission on Policing for Northern Ireland in 1998, Patten oversaw a comprehensive review that culminated in recommendations for the creation of the Police Service of Northern Ireland to replace the Royal Ulster Constabulary. Patten stated: "The report took about a year or a year and a half but it's the bit of work I'm proudest of. I loved the job in Northern Ireland. I loved being a European Commissioner — but the job of which I'm proudest is Northern Ireland. In a way that some people would think was a bit self-regarding, I sort of think of it as part of my genuflection to my past".

== Personal life ==
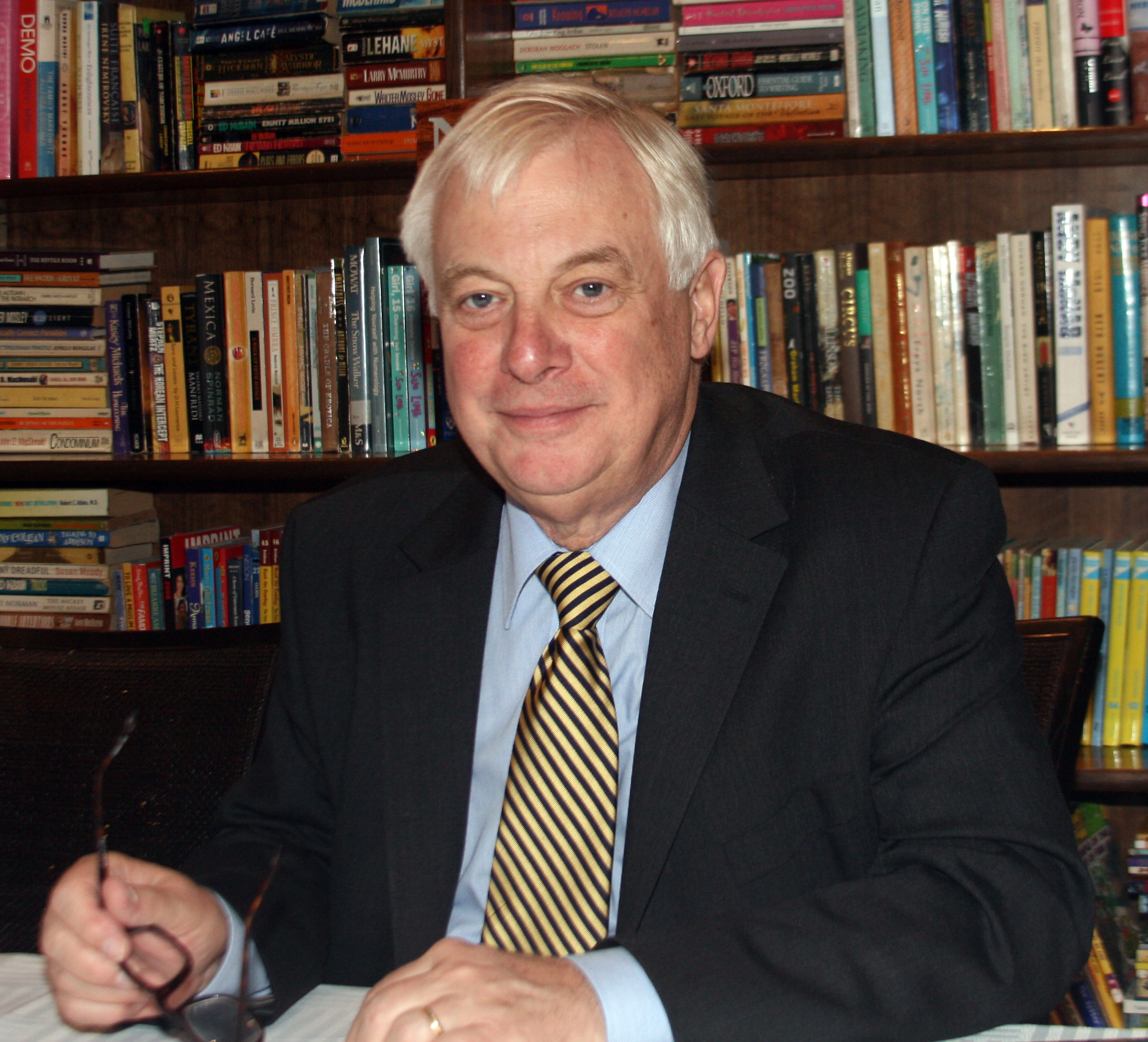
Patten (2008)

Patten married Lavender Thornton, a barrister, on 11 September 1971. They have three daughters, including the actress Alice Patten.

On 29 September 2005, he published his memoirs, Not Quite the Diplomat: Home Truths About World Affairs.

In October 2009, Patten was Chief Guest at The Doon School, a boarding school in Dehradun, India, which is a member of the United Kingdom's Headmasters' and Headmistresses' Conference.

Patten is a Catholic and oversaw Pope Benedict XVI's visit to the United Kingdom in September 2010. In 2010, The Tablet named him as one of Britain's most influential Catholics.

In February 2010, Patten was appointed President of Medical Aid for Palestinians, but he stepped down in June 2011.

In 2014 Pope Francis appointed Patten to head a body to advise the Vatican on media strategy and on how to handle the press, which he remained on until 2016.

== In the media ==
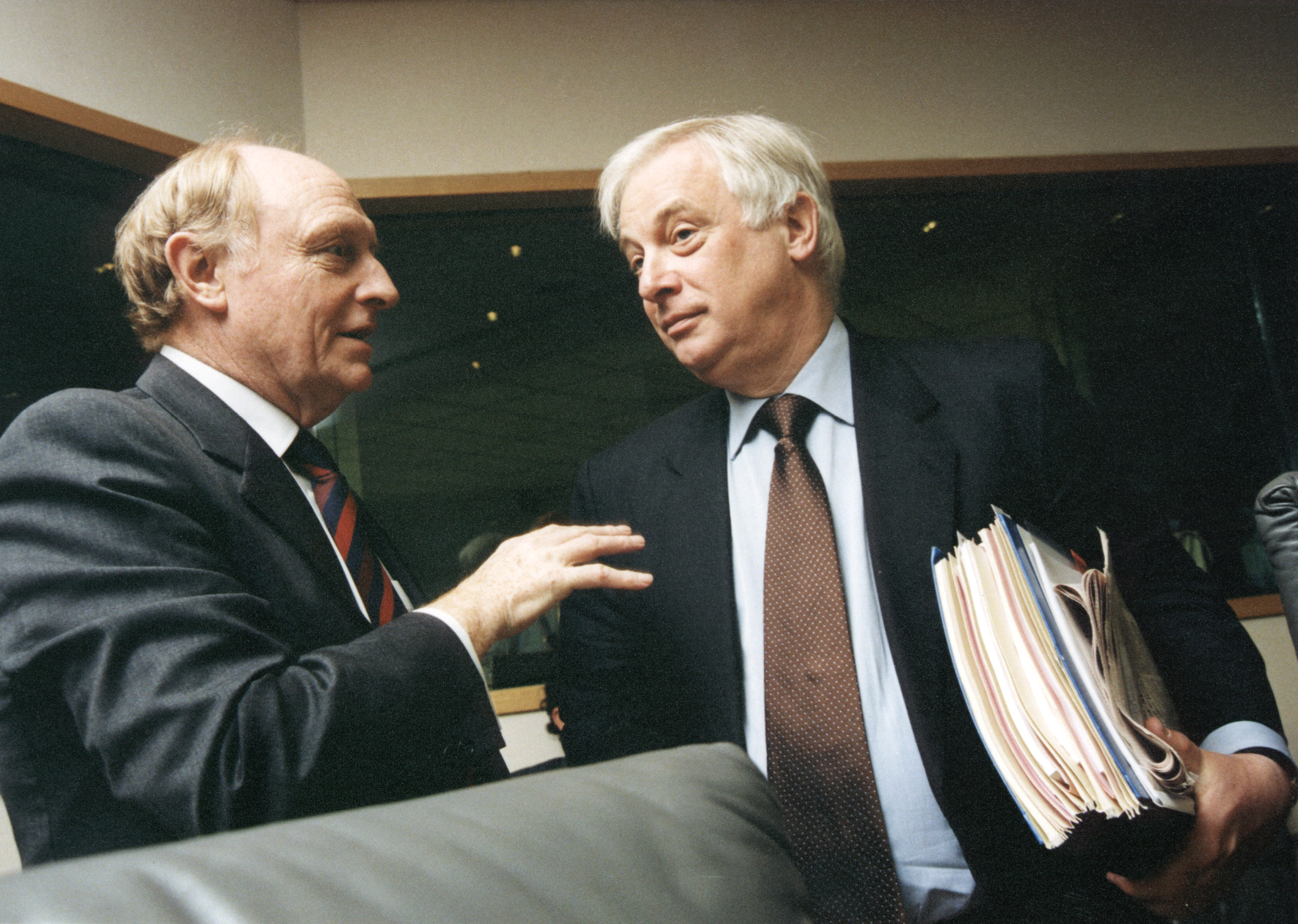
Patten with Neil Kinnock (2001)

Patten was interviewed about the rise of Thatcherism for the 2006 BBC TV documentary series Tory! Tory! Tory!

Patten and his time in Hong Kong was the subject of the 5-part documentary series The Last Governor, which was filmed throughout his time in Hong Kong, including his arrival, key moments of his government such as the 1995 elections and his final day in office, ending as he departs Government House for the last time.

The 1996 Hong Kong parody film Bodyguards of the Last Governor, presents 'Christ Pattern' as the Governor of Hong Kong. In addition to the name, Pattern appears to be based heavily on Patten, matching his appearance, political affiliation (Conservative) and family (a wife and two daughters with him in Hong Kong). His role however is minor as the film depicts him being replaced with one month to go before the handover. He is portrayed by Noel Lester Rands.

Patten is portrayed the video game Hong Kong 97 as ordering Chin, an unspecified relative of Bruce Lee, to massacre the entire population of mainland China.

== Honours ==
Arms as displayed at St George's Chapel, Windsor

In the 1998 New Year Honours, Patten was appointed a member of the Order of the Companions of Honour (CH). Patten was appointed Knight Companion of the Order of the Garter (KG) in April 2023 by King Charles III.

In 2004, he was awarded the insignia of Grand Officer of the Order of the Star of Romania. In 2005, he was bestowed the First Class of the Order of the Cross of Terra Mariana of Estonia. In November 2016, Patten was made a Commander of the Legion of Honour, and was presented with the insignia by Sylvie Bermann, the French ambassador to the United Kingdom, at Kensington Palace Gardens.. In 2025, he was conferred the Grand Cordon of the Order of the Rising Sun in recognition of his distinguished contribution to strengthening relations between Japan and the United Kingdom.

== Awards ==
In 2003, Patten was awarded an honorary Doctor of Laws (LLD) degree from the University of Bath. In September 2005, he was elected a Distinguished Honorary Fellow of Massey College in the University of Toronto (the only person so elected except Prince Philip, Duke of Edinburgh; he also received an honorary Doctor of Sacred Letters (DSLitt) degree from the University of Trinity College, Toronto, and an honorary Doctor of Letters (DLitt) degree from the University of Ulster. In March 2009, Patten received the title Doctor honoris causa from South East European University.

== Bibliography ==
=== Books ===
- Patten, Chris (1983). The Tory Case. Longman Higher Education. ISBN 0-582-29612-9.
- — (1997). Letters to Hong Kong. Hong Kong: Information Services Department.
- — (1998). East and West: The Last Governor of Hong Kong on Power, Freedom and the Future. Macmillan. ISBN 978-0-3337-4787-2.
- — (2005). Not Quite the Diplomat: Home Truths About World Affairs. Allen Lane. ISBN 0-7139-9855-5.
- — (2006). Cousins and Strangers: America, Britain, and Europe in a New Century. Times Books. ISBN 0-8050-7788-X.
- — (2008). What Next? Surviving the Twenty-First Century. Allen Lane. ISBN 978-0-7139-9856-6.
- — (2017). First Confession: A Sort of Memoir. Allen Lane. ISBN 978-0-241-27559-7.
- — (2022). The Hong Kong Diaries. Allen Lane. ISBN 978-0-241-56049-5.

=== Critical studies and reviews of Patten's work ===
What Next?

- Sumption, Jonathan (4 October 2008). "The pragmatic approach". The Spectator. 308 (9397): 38. Archived from the original on 12 January 2009.

== Bibliography ==
- Jonathan Dimbleby (1997). The Last Governor. Little, Brown. ISBN 0-316-18583-3.
- Chris Patten (2005). Not Quite the Diplomat: Home Truths About World Affairs. Allen Lane. ISBN 0-7139-9855-5.

Parliament of the United Kingdom
| Preceded by Edward Brown | Member of Parliament for Bath; 1979–1992 | Succeeded by Don Foster |
Legislative Council of Hong Kong
| Preceded by Sir David Wilson | President of the Legislative Council; 1992–1993 | Succeeded by John Joseph Swaine |
Political offices
| Preceded by Timothy Raison | Minister for Overseas Development; 1986–1989 | Succeeded by Lynda Chalker |
| Preceded by Nicholas Ridley | Secretary of State for the Environment; 1989–1990 | Succeeded by Michael Heseltine |
| Preceded by Kenneth Baker | Chancellor of the Duchy of Lancaster; 1990–1992 | Succeeded by William Waldegrave |
| Preceded by Sir David Wilson | Governor of Hong Kong; 1992–1997 | Succeeded by Tung Chee-hwa as Chief Executive of Hong Kong |
| Preceded by Sir David Wilson | President of the Executive Council; 1992–1997 | Succeeded by Tung Chee-hwa as Chief Executive of Hong Kong |
| Preceded by Leon Brittan | British European Commissioner; 1999–2004; Served alongside: Neil Kinnock | Succeeded by Peter Mandelson |
| Preceded by Leon Brittan | European Commissioner for External Relations; 1999–2004 | Succeeded by Benita Ferrero-Waldner |
Party political offices
| Preceded by Kenneth Baker | Chairman of the Conservative Party; 1990–1992 | Succeeded by Norman Fowler |
Academic offices
| Preceded by The Viscount Ridley | Chancellor of Newcastle University; 1999–2009 | Succeeded by Liam Donaldson |
| Preceded by Roy Jenkins | Chancellor of the University of Oxford; 2003–2024 | Succeeded by William Hague |
Media offices
| Preceded by Michael Lyons | Chairman of the BBC Trust; 2011–2014 | Succeeded by Diane Coyle; Acting |
Orders of precedence in the United Kingdom
| Preceded by The Lord Kerr of Kinlochard | Gentlemen; Baron Patten of Barnes | Followed by The Lord Kinnock |
