= HMS Lavender =

Two ships of the Royal Navy have been named HMS Lavender:

- HMS Lavender (1915) was an Acacia-class sloop launched in 1915 and sunk in 1917
- HMS Lavender (K60) was a Flower-class corvette, launched in 1940 and sold in 1946
