= Lavender, Georgia =

Unincorporated community in Georgia, U.S.

Coordinates: 34°17′31″N 85°20′28″W

Lavender is an unincorporated community in Floyd County, in the U.S. state of Georgia.

== History ==
A post office called Lavender was established in 1889, and remained in operation until it was discontinued in 1910. The community was named for George Michael Lavender, who kept a store there.
