= Sheila Turnage =

American author

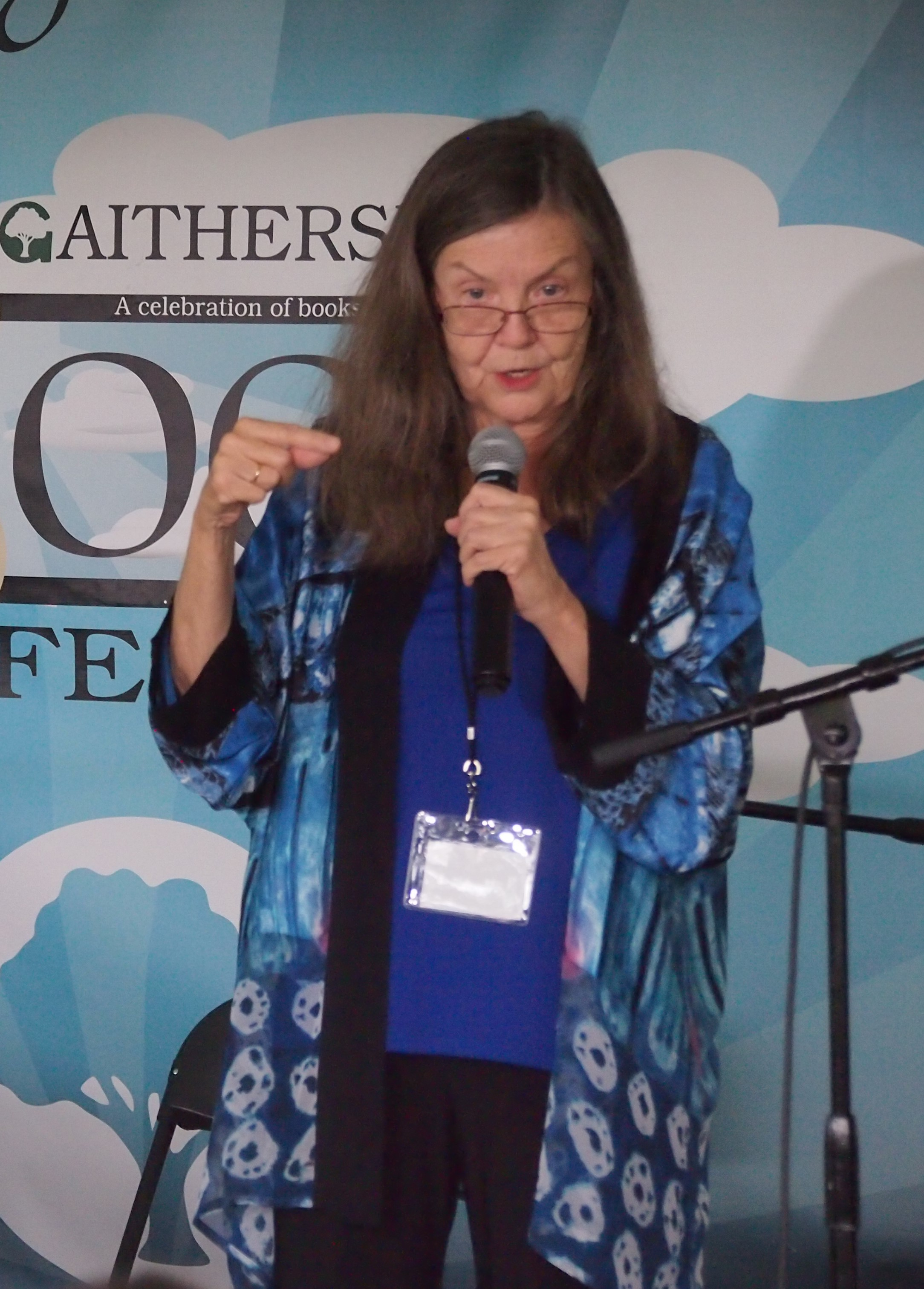
- Sheila Turnage reading at the 2017 Gaithersburg Book Festival
- Born: Jacksonville’s, North Carolina
- Education: East Carolina University
- Writing career
- Notable work: Three Times Lucky (2012)
- Notable awards: 2013 Newbery Honor

Sheila Turnage is an American author. She is best known for her children's novel Three Times Lucky (2012), which received a Newbery Honor in 2013.

== Early life and education ==
Turnage was born in Jacksonville, North Carolina and studied anthropology at East Carolina University. In addition to the Mo & Dale Mysteries, she has also written nonfiction for adults and a picture book.

She knew she was a writer since first grade, where her teacher encouraged her to write a story that she thought was so good, she asked Turnage to read it to third graders. She decided that day that she would be a writer. She doesn’t regret studying anthropology in college because the lessons she learned from it are applicable to her writing.

== Career ==
Turnage began writing Three Times Lucky more than four years before its publication when she kept hearing an 11-year-old girl named Moses LoBeau say to her in her imagination, “You have a minute? I have a story to tell you.” She didn’t intend to write a middle grade book initially, she just set out to write a good book. She learned it was middle grade when she sent the draft to her editor.

The popularity of the Newbury Winner was kick-started by the Mo & Dale Mysteries, which includes Three Times Lucky (2012), The Ghost of Tupelo Landing (2014), The Odds of Getting Even (2015), and The Law of Finders Keepers(2018). After ending the series, she wrote a standalone historical fiction middle grade novel called Island of Spies (2022). Besides her middle grade novels, she has also written nonfiction for adults and a picture book. She enjoys writing mysteries because she likes to solve them alongside her readers.

The inspiration for her book Island of Spies came from a family trip she took to Hatteras Island when she was 6 years old. She was walking alongside her dad on the beach when she saw a large black blob and asked him what it was. He said it was oil from German U-Boats that patrolled the island’s coast in World War 2. After the national crisis caused by the bombing of Pearl Harbor, the US President decided to keep hush about the German boats on the East Coast, to keep Americans from worrying that the islanders had to defend themselves. She became interested in the topic and has wanted to write a book set on the North Carolina coast ever since.

Her books are set in Eastern North Carolina, where she grew up, because she feels inspired by its unique small-town Southern culture.

When Turnage writes, she first listens for her characters’ voices in her imagination, and when she has enough material to tell their story, begins to write the majority of the book. She believes that books that tell the story her characters want to tell are better than books that tell the story she wants to tell. She often switches between Mo and Dale as her favorite character from Three Times Lucky.

She has been attending the same creative writing class at Pitt Community College on and off for thirty years and its instructor, Patsy O’Leary, had a huge influence on her novels.

She does visits to elementary schools to discuss her books and teach about writing.

She lives outside of Farmville, North Carolina, on a farm that belonged to her great-grandparents with her husband, Rodney Beasley and their many pets. Their house borders the woods, so they often see wild animals like deer in their front yard.

Her favorite time to write is in the morning, but when she has a deadline she writes all day, every day. She is currently working on a new novel that contains “one murder and two miracles”, but she doesn’t know its title yet.
