= Lavender (album) =

Album by Machiko Yamane and Paul Christopher Musgrave

Lavender, cover

Lavender is an album by Machiko Yamane and Paul Christopher Musgrave, released in 1991. It contains 12 original compositions for piano and string orchestra, and was recorded with members of the Vancouver Symphony Orchestra and the CBC Radio Orchestra.

== Reviews ==
According to CD Review, Lavender is "poetically performed", and "eclectic, with a classical flavor". "The themes and arrangements are elegant, light, and lovely" according to the NAPRA Trade Journal, who also noted a "Satie" influence. Margaret McCoy of Virginia Pathways wrote that Lavender is "as fresh as the breeze on a hyacinth-covered open field, yet as elegant as a candlelight dinner for two high above Park Avenue", and compared it favorably to the work of George Winston. She praised its depth and sophistication.

According to Dan Gassoway, "Paul Christopher's original piano pieces stroll lazily along with a quiet and poignant charm that slowly seduces the listener". In the Lifedance Music Guide he wrote that Lavender's "deceptively simple melodies spin into delicately interwoven patterns that often touch the heart's subtle emotional chords."

== Personnel ==
- Paul Christopher Musgrave - piano
- Andrew Brown - solo viola
- Rene Worst - acoustic bass
- Ian Putz - saxophone ("Arizona")
- Vancouver Symphony Orchestra members - violin, viola, cello
- CBC Radio Orchestra members - violin, viola, cello

== Track list ==
1. "Lavender"
2. "November Afternoon"
3. "Autumn Field"
4. "Tuesday"
5. "Shintaro"
6. "Arizona"
7. "Pastel"
8. "Mirage"
9. "Vignette"
10. "Riverside Drive"
11. "Cecilia's Romance"
12. "Emerald Lake"
