= Alice Patten =

English actress

The Honourable Alice Patten
- Born: London, England
- Education: Island School
- Alma mater: Queens' College, Cambridge
- Occupation: Actress
- Years active: 2002–present
- Height: 184 cm (6 ft 0 in)
- Father: Chris Patten, Baron Patten

Alice Patten (born 1979) is an English actress, and the daughter of Chris Patten, Baron Patten of Barnes, a prominent British Conservative politician and the last Governor of Hong Kong. She played a leading role in the Bollywood film Rang De Basanti (2006), earning her praise from Indian film critics.

== Early life and education ==
Patten was educated at Island School in Hong Kong and at Queens' College, Cambridge.

She lived in Hong Kong from 1992 to 1997, during her father's governorship.

== Career ==
Her first major role after graduation was Eugenie in Vincent in Brixton in the West End in 2002.

In 2004, she appeared in Jonathan Creek as Gillian Bailey.

In 2005 and 2006, she appeared in English Touring Theatre's Hamlet, playing Ophelia opposite Ed Stoppard.

In 2006, she appeared in the Bollywood film Rang De Basanti as Sue McKinley, a young British woman who comes to India to make a documentary film about the British rule in the Indian subcontinent. In 2008, she played Thea in Hedda, a new version of Ibsen's Hedda Gabler, at London's Gate Theatre and, in 2009, she guest-starred as Arthur's mother Ygraine in the BBC fantasy drama series Merlin.

Patten also played the role of Vicky Anderson, in an episode of New Tricks, the daughter of an English-born Hong Kong businessman, Douglas Anderson, who had been involved in questionable building deals in Hong Kong, shortly before the end of British rule in 1997.

== Filmography ==
=== Television ===
- The Forsyte Saga (2002) as Imogen (2 episodes)
- Where the Heart Is (2003) as Candida Oliver-Watts (3 episodes)
- The Last King (2003) as Lady Frances Stewart (1 episode)
- Jonathan Creek (2004) as Dawn/Gillian Bailey (1 episode)
- Midsomer Murders (2004) as Emily Hide (1 episode)
- Heroes and Villains (2008) as Joann (1 episode)
- Mistresses (2010) as Alice (4 episodes)
- New Tricks (2010) as Vicky Anderson (1 episode)
- Merlin (2009–2010) as Y'Graine (3 episodes)
- The Musketeers (2014) as Sister Hélène (1 episode)
- Our Girl (2014) as Rebecca (1 episode)
- Downton Abbey (2014) as Diana Clark (1 episode)
- Six Wives with Lucy Worsley (2016) as Katherine Parr (1 episode)

=== Film ===
- Vincent In Brixton (2003) as Eugenie Loyer
- Rang De Basanti (2006) as Sue McKinley
- Trade Routes (2008) as Sarah
- The Dry Cleaner (2019)
