= Lavender Peak (British Columbia) =

Mountain peak in British Columbia, Canada

- Location within British Columbia

Highest point
- Elevation: 2,306 m (7,566 ft)
- Prominence: 1,481 m (4,859 ft)
- Parent peak: Bromley Peak (2327 m)
- Listing: Mountains of British Columbia
- Coordinates: 55°39′04″N 129°19′07″W

Geography
- Location: British Columbia, Canada
- District: Cassiar Land District
- Parent range: Boundary Ranges
- Topo map: NTS 103P11 Kinskuch River

Lavender Peak is a mountain peak in northwestern British Columbia, Canada.
