= East and West (book) =

1998 book by Chris Patten

- Author: Christopher Patten
- Language: English
- Subject: Politics
- Publisher: Crown
- Publication date: 14 September 1998
- Pages: 304
- ISBN: 0-8129-3000-2
- OCLC: 39108737
- Dewey Decimal: 951.25/04 21
- LC Class: DS796.H757 P39 1998

East and West (subtitled "China, Power, and the Future of Asia") is a 1998 book by the British politician Chris Patten about his experiences as the last Governor of Hong Kong. In this book, he attempts to provide insights into the last years of British colonial rule in Hong Kong, and defends his decision of introducing the controversial representative democracy into the territory. In the second part of the book he argues that some Asian economies had outgrown their political structures and reforms are needed for stability and economic growth. He further asserts that the so-called Asian values are nothing more than a euphemism for legitimising the totalitarian regimes.

Patten's introduction of representative democracy into Hong Kong during his governorship induced scathing criticism from the Chinese authority and he was described by high-ranking Chinese officials as "whore of the East", a "serpent" and a "criminal who would be condemned for a thousand generations". The Chinese government did not welcome its publication and it is said that China's official distaste for Patten led his original publisher, HarperCollins, owned by Rupert Murdoch, who is intent on expanding his business in China, to cancel publication. The book was finally published by Crown in the US and Macmillan in the UK.

== Overview ==
The book is divided into three sections. In the first section, titled "Governing", Patten recounts various important events that happened during his office as the last governor of Hong Kong from July 1992 to 30 June 1997. In particular, he describes how his proposal of electoral reforms in the Legislative Council was met with criticisms from the Chinese government, and how he was personally denounced by high-ranking officials using the "most extreme lexicon of the Cultural Revolution" as the "whore of the East", a "serpent" and a "criminal who would be condemned for a thousand generations". He also details China's tactics of using trade and access to its huge market to lobby Hong Kong businessmen and British politicians to exert pressure on him to back down. Patten argues that the success of Hong Kong is based on "a clean and open administration, the rule of law, public participation in government, a free press and respect for civil liberties." As such, China's hostility to democracy and advocacy of the so-called Asian values would undermine the very foundation of Hong Kong's success.

In the second section, titled "In the view from Hong Kong", Patten first detailed and analysed the rapid growth of the East Asian Tigers and other Southeast Asian countries after the World War II. He asserted that the growth was largely export-led and those Asian countries were benefactors of the early wave of globalisation. The Asian financial crisis that began in late 1997, on the other hand, was the results of weak regulation of banks and wild speculations of the property markets in the involved countries; Since "a number of Asian economies had outgrown their political structures", they cannot adjust to the changes as smoothly and peacefully as other more representative forms of government.

== Reception ==
The New York Times Book Review describes East and West as a "spirited defense of his policies" and a "lucid analysis of some of the larger issues that confront the West in its dealings with Asia". The book is "fresh", "eloquent" and "unblinkered", and it "challenges some of the received wisdom on these subjects and marches with spirit and independence toward its conclusions". A review in International Affairs, a leading peer-reviewed academic journal of international relations, describes the book as an "articulate exposition" and contains "electric wit". The review concludes that the book "demonstrates how a coherent mix of engagement with China coupled with constraint on its unwelcome actions adds up to a practical China policy". On the other hand, China Daily, a Chinese Communist Party-controlled state-run publication, has a scathing review on the book. The paper calls Patten a "cold war warrior" and this book "completely exposes his anti-China obsessions". The review adds that the "retired governor has done everything he can to hurt the feelings of the Chinese people with extremely provocative language".

== See also ==
- Politics of Hong Kong
