= Lavender (surname) =

Lavender is a surname of Anglo-Norman origin. It is probably an occupational surname derived from Old French "lavandier". It could be applied generally to a launderer or specifically to a worker who washed raw wool or rinsed cloth after fulling. People with the surname include:

- Abraham Lavender (1940–2022), American sociologist
- Brian Lavender (born 1947), Canadian ice hockey player
- Catherine Hardy Lavender (1930–2017), American athlete
- Daniela Lavender (born 1975), Brazilian actress
- David Lavender (1910–2003), American historian and writer
- Gemma Lavender (born 1986), British astronomer, author, and journalist
- George Lavender (born 1955), American politician
- Ian Lavender (1946–2024), English stage, film and television actor
- Jantel Lavender (born 1988), American basketball player
- Jimmy Lavender (1884–1960), American baseball player
- Jody Lavender (born 1979), American racing driver
- Joe Lavender (born 1949), American football player
- Larry Lavender (fl. 2000s–2010s), American dancer and dance scholar
- Mark Lavender (born 1967), Australian cricketer
- Nate Lavender (born 2000), American baseball player
- Robert E. Lavender (1926–2020), American state supreme court judge
- Tina Lavender (born 1965/66), British midwife and professor of midwifery
- Cindy Lavender-Bowe (born 1970), American politician
