= Armuchee Creek =

Stream in Georgia, U.S.

Coordinates: 34°20′43″N 85°07′20″W

Armuchee Creek is a stream in the U.S. state of Georgia. It is a tributary to the Oostanaula River.

"Armuchee" is a name derived from the Cherokee language, but its meaning is uncertain. One source claims it means "land of the flowers", while another source proposes the name is meant to honor Am Ma Choo, a Cherokee landholder. Many variant names have been recorded, including "Amuchee Creek", "Armachey Creek", "Armucha Creek", "Armuche Creek", "Big Armuchee Creek" and "Big Fork Armuchee Creek".
