= Positive non-interventionism =

Hong Kong's economic policy of the 1970s and 1980s; forerunner to neoliberalism

- Traditional Chinese: 積極不干預
- Literal meaning: Active non-intervention
Transcriptions
Standard Mandarin
- Hanyu Pinyin: Jījí bù gānyù
Yue: Cantonese
- Jyutping: zik1gik6 bat1 gon1jyu6

Positive non-interventionism (Chinese: 積極不干預; pinyin: Jījí bù gānyù; Jyutping: zik1gik6 bat1 gon1jyu6) was the economic policy of Hong Kong, which can be traced back to the time when Hong Kong was under British administration. It was first officially implemented in 1971 by Financial Secretary of Hong Kong John Cowperthwaite, influenced by Arthur Grenfell Clarke and Geoffrey Follows, who believed that the economy was doing well in the absence of government intervention but that it was important to create the regulatory and physical infrastructure to facilitate market-based decision making. The policy was continued by subsequent Financial secretaries, including Sir Philip Haddon-Cave. While the American economist Milton Friedman has cited it as a fairly comprehensive implementation of laissez-faire policy, others have described it as a variant of corporatism or even as a mixed economic system.

== Handover of Hong Kong and the decline of Positive non-interventionism ==
Although post-handover Financial secretaries such as Donald Tsang, Antony Leung, Henry Tang and John Tsang all defended the minimal intervention approach, they didn't call it positive non-interventionism and didn't advocate for it. Donald Tsang called his economic policy "Big Market, Small Government", and embraced the Third Way, influenced by Wong Yuk-man and Tung Chee-hwa and similar to Andrew Wong. During his term as Financial Secretary of Hong Kong, Donald Tsang coined the term "caring capitalism" in 1996, which describe the governments's approach of giving priority to economic growth and then using the new-found wealth to develop social infrastructure and welfare services. William W. L. Wong argues that Hong Kong had under Donald Tsang had a welfare capitalist system, and Christian Aspalter also holds this view, but it is still contended that Donald Tsang used positive non-interventionist elements. After Hong Kong became part of the People's Republic of China, Hong Kong implemented a mix of a liberal economy and a welfare state. Peter Guy argues that Hong Kong embraces a predatory form of capitalism. Under John Tsang’s term as Financial secretary, welfare measures rose in 2012. During his term as Chief Executive of Hong Kong, Leung Chun-ying embraced some elements of positive non-interventionism and also used it as a governance strategy. Like her predecessors, Carrie Lam also used positive non-interventionist policies even after pledging to adopt a “new fiscal philosophy” and being seen as a person which advocated for the third way. However under John Lee Ka-chiu since 2024 the government tries to navigate between capitalism and socialism, it is not known whether it will officially pursue third way policies.

== First-hand explanation ==
According to Cowperthwaite:

In the long run, the aggregate of decisions of individual businessmen, exercising individual judgment in a free economy, even if often mistaken, is less likely to do harm than the centralised decisions of a government; and certainly the harm is likely to be counteracted faster.

According to Haddon-Cave:

positive non-interventionism involves taking the view that it is normally futile and damaging to the growth rate of an economy, particularly an open economy, for the Government to attempt to plan the allocation of resources available to the private sector and to frustrate the operation of market forces.

Haddon-Cave goes on to say that the "positive" part means the government carefully considers each possible intervention to determine "where the advantage" lies, and, although usually it will come to the conclusion that the intervention is harmful, sometimes it will decide to intervene.

== Similar philosophies ==
While John Tsang Chun-wah wasn't a positive non-interventionist, he followed a fiscal conservative philosophy while embracing some social welfare programs. During his term as Chief Executive of Hong Kong, Henry Tang supported free markets and a small government similar to Donald Tsang's "Big Market, Small Government" program. Dozens of people aired their grievances to Henry Tang over the funding cuts to welfare services made over the past couple of years. However, later he claimed that some policies aimed for welfare, even when lawmakers were critical of this, after year's Henry Tang promised higher rent for elders. Times before he praised after all social enterprises. also he promised more family-related reforms. and promised more social welfare for social workers. The practice things Tang did make Tang's philosophy closer to positive non-interventionism. Tang openly embraces capitalism and also admires the US President Calvin Coolidge.

== See also ==
- John James Cowperthwaite
- Milton Friedman
- Philip Haddon-Cave
