= Impeachment and no-confidence motions in Hong Kong =

According to Hong Kong Basic Law, the Legislative Council may pass a motion of impeachment against the Chief Executive by a two-thirds majority and report to the Chinese Government for decision. The Council may also vote on non-binding no-confidence motions with a lower threshold.

Motions of such are usually tabled when the government performed bad in opinion polls, and therefore are regarded as showing discontent of Hongkongers with the governance.

== Impeachment motions ==
Cover of the Basic Law

According to Article 73(9) of the Basic Law,

If a motion initiated jointly by one-fourth of all the members of the Legislative Council charges the Chief Executive with serious breach of law or dereliction of duty and if he or she refuses to resign, the Council may, after passing a motion for investigation, give a mandate to the Chief Justice of the Court of Final Appeal to form and chair an independent investigation committee. The committee shall be responsible for carrying out the investigation and reporting its findings to the Council. If the committee considers the evidence sufficient to substantiate such charges, the Council may pass a motion of impeachment by a two-thirds majority of all its members and report it to the Central People's Government for decision; [...]

The five stages of impeachment, therefore, are:

1. Initiate a motion by one-fourth of MPs charging the Chief Executive with serious breach of law or dereliction of duty;
2. Pass a motion for investigation with a simple majority of each of the two groups of members present, i.e. members of the Election Committee, and members of the functional constituencies and geographical constituencies;
3. Carry out investigation by an independent investigation committee;
4. Pass a motion of impeachment by a two-thirds majority;
5. Report to the Chinese Government for decision

As of now, only motions for investigation had been tabled, but were all defeated, and thus no impeachment proceedings had been triggered.

== No-confidence motions ==
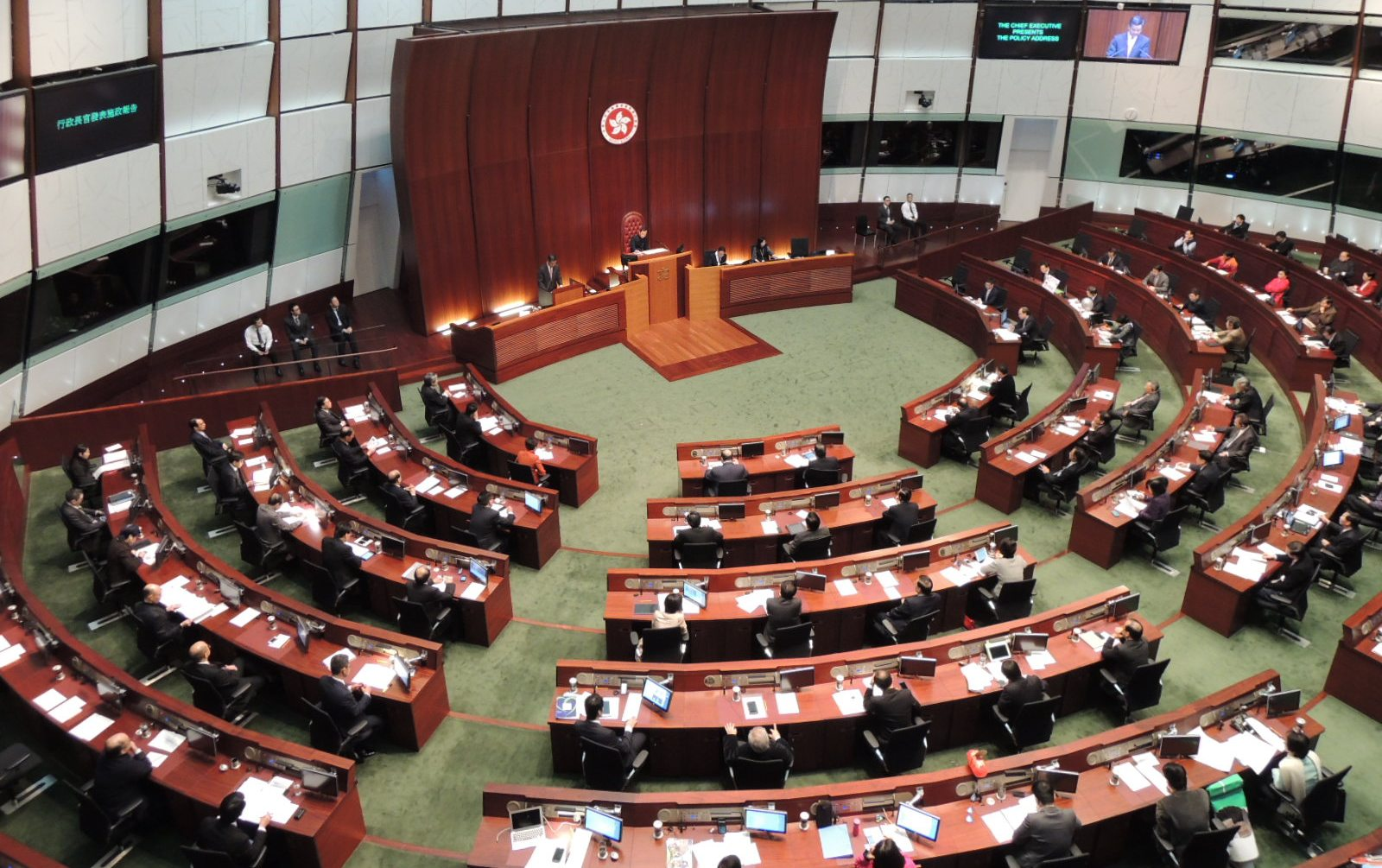
Legislative Council in meeting

No-confidence motion is non-binding and tabled as members' bill, which requires simple majority from both groups in the council to pass. As the appointment or removal of Chief Executives and officials are decided by the Chinese Government, such motions would not force any resignation. Nevertheless, no-confidence motions can create political pressure if adopted as the official has lost the support from most of the political parties.

Beijing-backed Hong Kong media had slammed the no-confidence motions as breaching the Basic Law and "contaminating the rule of law", claiming the parliament was not empowered to declare no confidence in anyone.

In 1987, a member of the Hong Kong Basic Law Consultative Committee argued that a further sub-provision reading "a vote of non-confidence against the Chief Executive endorsed by a two-thirds majority of the members of the legislature" should be added to Article 52, and that the Chief Executive could dissolve the legislature if the legislature case a vote of the non-confidence against him, but the Chief Executive would have to resign if the newly elected legislature again cast a vote of non-confidence against him. The suggestion, however, was not accepted.

== List of motions ==
Only motions against the leader of Hong Kong or the government are listed. Other similar motions are detailed below. denotes impeachment motions.

Leader	Date	Motion	Proposer	Result	
Chris Patten	12 July 1995	Vote of no confidence in the Governor of Hong Kong	Cheung Man-kwong (Democratic)	17–35–4	Defeated
Tung Chee-hwa	14 May 2003	Calling for the resignation of the Chief Executive, Mr TUNG Chee-hwa	Albert Chan (Ind.)	14–11–0 (GC); 5–24–0 (FC)	Defeated
Tung Chee-hwa	8 October 2003	Calling on the Chief Executive Mr TUNG Chee-hwa to step down	Emily Lau (Frontier)	16–9–0 (GC); 5–22–0 (FC)	Defeated
Donald Tsang	19 April 2012	Vote of no confidence in the Chief Executive	Tanya Chan (Civic)	14–7–2 (GC); 4–11–3 (FC)	Defeated
Leung Chun-ying	12 December 2012	Vote of no confidence in the Chief Executive	Wu Chi-wai (Democratic)	18–14–1 (GC); 9–20–4 (FC)	Defeated
Leung Chun-ying	9 January 2013	Motion under Article 73(9) of the Basic Law	Leung Kwok-hung (LSD)	18–14–0 (GC); 9–23–0 (FC)	Defeated
Leung Chun-ying	16 October 2013	Vote of no confidence in the Chief Executive	Kwok Ka-ki (Civic)	17–15–1 (GC); 9–17–5 (FC)	Defeated
Leung Chun-ying	8 June 2017	Motion under Article 73(9) of the Basic Law	Alvin Yeung (Civic)	17–12–0 (GC); 11–22–0 (FC)	Defeated
Carrie Lam	29 May 2019	Vote of no confidence in the Chief Executive	Andrew Wan (Democratic)	15–18–0 (GC); 8–22–0 (FC)	Defeated
Carrie Lam	5 December 2019	Motion under Article 73(9) of the Basic Law	Alvin Yeung (Civic)	16–14–0 (GC); 10–22–0 (FC)	Defeated
Carrie Lam	N/A	No confidence in the Fifth Term Government of the Hong Kong Special Administrative Region	Dennis Kwok (Civic)	Not debated	

== Motions ==
All no-confidence and impeachment motions were proposed by the pro-democracy camp, and were all defeated in the Legislative Council due to the objection from pro-government and pro-business groups. Cheung Man-kwong is the first legislator to table a motion of no-confidence in 1995, while the first attempt to trigger the impeachment proceedings is by Leung Kwok-hung in 2013.

=== Colonial Legislative Council ===
Early in June 1994, the Legislative Council debated the historic motion of censure against Chris Patten, the last Governor of Hong Kong, over his rejection by prerogative to move an amendment over freezing rates. The motion by Szeto Wah of the Democratic Party was adopted with 21 in favour and 11 against.

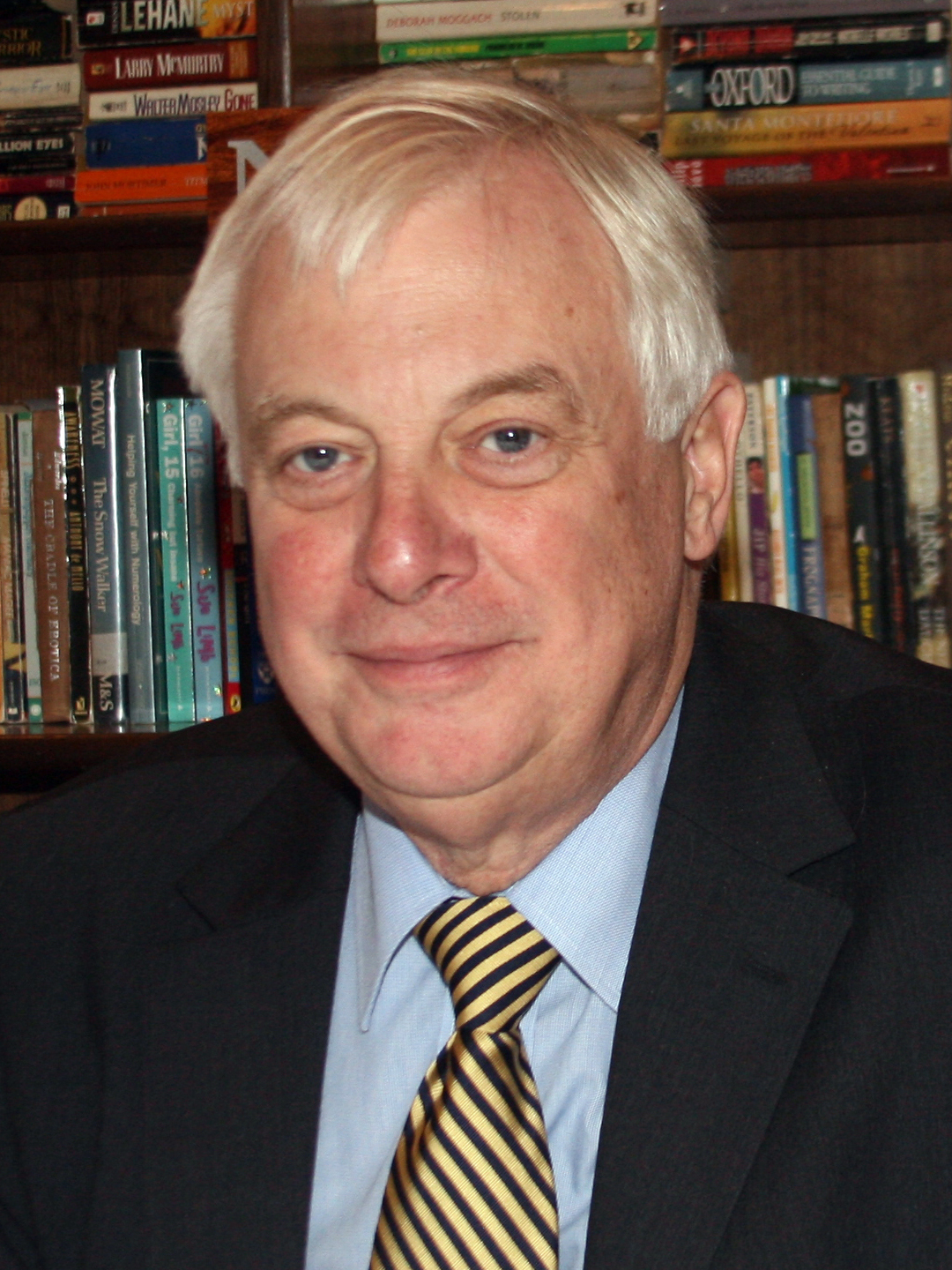
Chris Patten, Governor

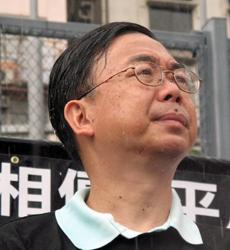
Cheung Man-kwong, motion proposer

In July 1995, Patten faced the first no-confidence vote in Hong Kong's history. The motion, (Note: The motion reads: That as the British Administration in Hong Kong has seriously damaged the future rule of law in Hong Kong, this Council expresses no confidence in Mr Christopher PATTEN, the Governor of Hong Kong.) moved by Cheung Man-kwong (Democratic), was in response to the Sino-British Joint Declaration, reached behind closed doors, for a post-handover Court of Final Appeal. The Party argued the British kowtowed to Chinese demands and jeopardised the rule of law by agreeing to a court with powers too watered down to guarantee judicial freedom in Hong Kong.

Patten branded the motion as "empty gesture politics" and as part of the election campaign. Before voting, Anson Chan, the Chief Secretary, denounced the motion, saying passing the motion would mean the council has lost confidence in Hong Kong's future.

The business lobby, pro-Beijing legislators and most independents voted against the motion or abstained. Allen Lee, leader of the Liberal Party called the motion a waste of time. The motion, along with the amendment proposed by Emily Lau which effectively made it a vote of no-confidence in Beijing and London, (Note: The motion as amended reads: The motion reads: That as the British and Chinese Governments have seriously damaged the future rule of law in Hong Kong, this Council expresses no confidence in them.) were both defeated.

Prior to the vote and as pressure has mounted on Patten, the Hong Kong Government announced plans to repeal parts of Emergency Regulations Ordinance and enact new regulations to safeguard media freedom. While the passage of the "humiliating" no-confidence measure would not force Patten to resign, it would damage his prestige.

=== 2nd Legislative Council ===
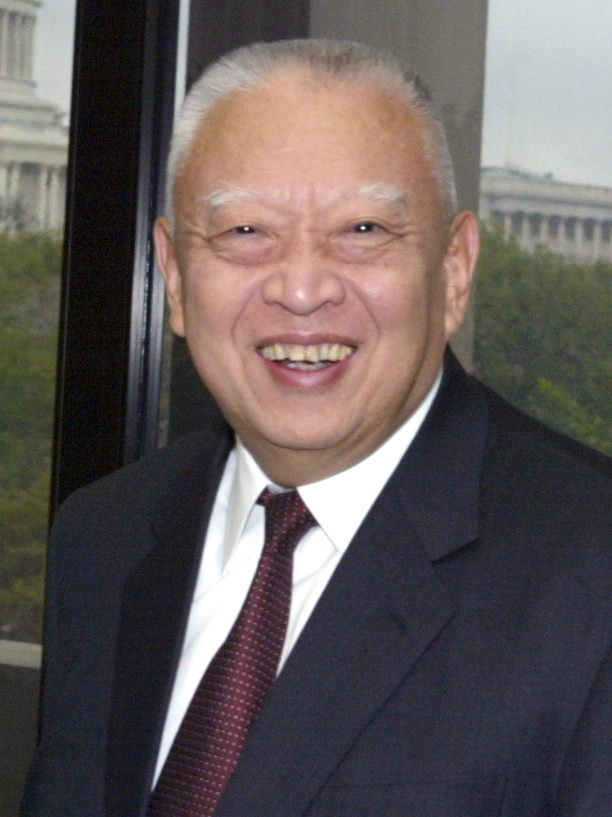
Tung Chee-hwa, Chief Executive

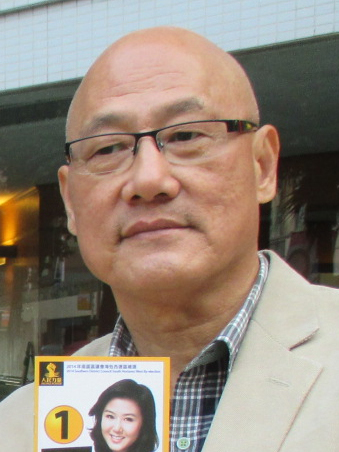
Albert Chan, motion proposer

On 7 May 2003, Antony Leung, the Financial Secretary, survived a no-confidence motion put forward by Margaret Ng over Lexusgate. A week later, Albert Chan moved a motion calling for resignation of Tung Chee-hwa as Chief Executive, (Note: The motion reads: That this Council calls for the resignation of the Chief Executive, Mr TUNG Chee-hwa.) citing the "disappointment and suffering" under Tung's rule, including SARS outbreak, Robert Chung affair, Penny Stocks Incident and 1997 bird flu. The motion was defeated with a margin of 19 in the FCs. Reacting to the first de facto no-confidence vote, Tung strongly criticised the pro-democracy legislators.

Three months later after the contentious Article 23 anti-subversion bill was shelved, Emily Lau from the Frontier called for Tung's resignation again as the public had made "repeated demands". (Note: The motion reads: That, as there has been retrogression in human rights, the rule of law and economic development in Hong Kong and democratization of the political system has remained stagnant under the administration of the Chief Executive Mr TUNG Chee-hwa, prompting the public to make repeated demands for him to step down, this Council calls on Mr TUNG to take the responsibility and resign in accordance with the wishes of the people.) It was the second motion of such kind in a year, but negatived again.

Under mounting pressure, Antony Leung resigned in July 2003, while Tung followed in 2005.

=== 4th Legislative Council ===
In February 2012, Chief Executive Donald Tsang was hit by corruption scandal for allegedly receiving hospitality from business tycoons. Paul Tse from the pro-Beijing bloc floated the idea of impeachment in the same month, but did not gather support from the largest pro-Beijing party DAB, or from democrats who opted for invoking Legislative Council (Powers and Privileges) Ordinance for investigation first.

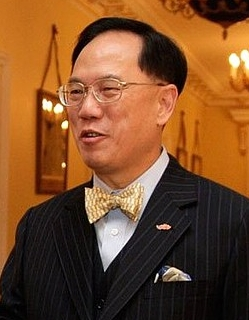
Donald Tsang, Chief Executive

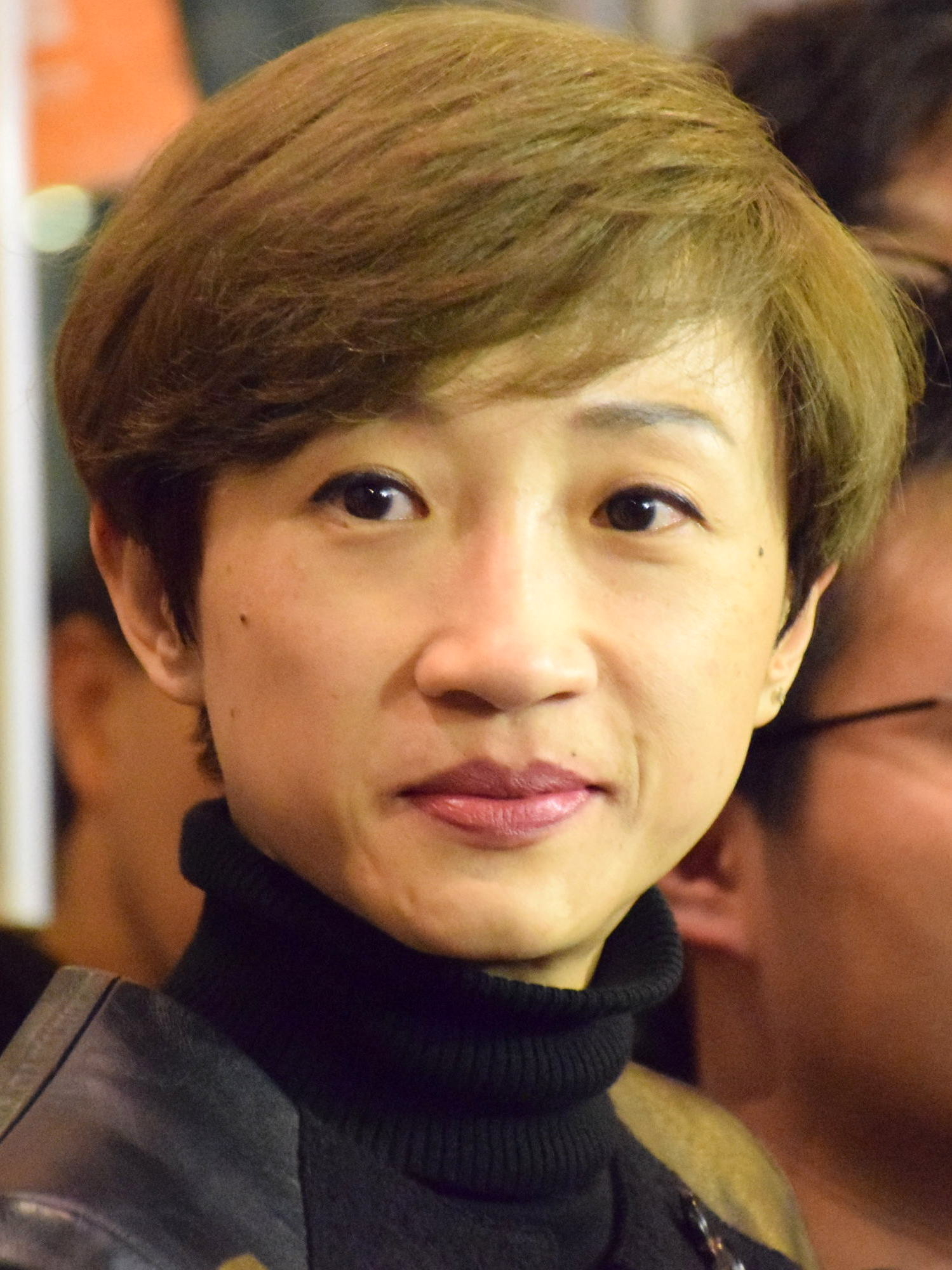
Tanya Chan, motion proposer

With the investigation attempt voted down by the pro-Beijing camp, Tanya Chan from Civic Party in April tabled the first no-confidence motion since the handover. (Note: The motion reads: That this Council has no confidence in the Chief Executive, Mr Donald TSANG.) The pro-Beijing camp continued supporting Tsang and therefore was defeated again, with a margin reduced to 7 in FCs. Chan said the motion was intended as signal to Tsang's successor, Leung Chun-ying, that Hongkongers, civil servants, and lawmakers will be watching him.

On 20 April, more than 20 pro-democracy MPs initiated a motion charging Tsang, but was not debated the legislature as the term of the Legislative Council ended in July. Tsang was charged with corruption in 2015 after he left office, found guilty and jailed in 2017, with the verdict quashed in 2019.

Another vote of no-confidence in Jasper Tsang, the President of the council, moved by Wong Yuk-man (People Power) over curtailing the debate of the Legislative Council (Amendment) Bill 2012 was not debated due to the imminent end of legislature term.

=== 5th Legislative Council ===
In November 2012, Wong Yuk-man tabled a vote of no confidence in Paul Chan, Secretary for Development and Eddie Ng, Secretary for Education for causing public outcry over drink-driving and National Education curriculum respectively. The motion was voted down.

In December 2012, three months after Leung Chun-ying assumed office as Chief Executive, Wu Chi-wai from the Democratic Party tabled a no-confidence vote (Note: The motion reads: That this Council has no confidence in the Chief Executive, Mr LEUNG Chun-ying.) for failing to give a clear account of illegal structures in his apartment found during the election campaign, but defeated again.

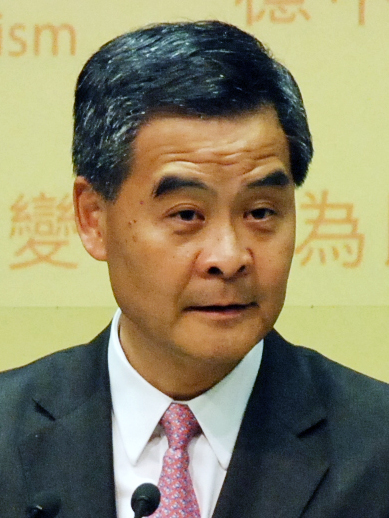
Leung Chun-ying, Chief Executive

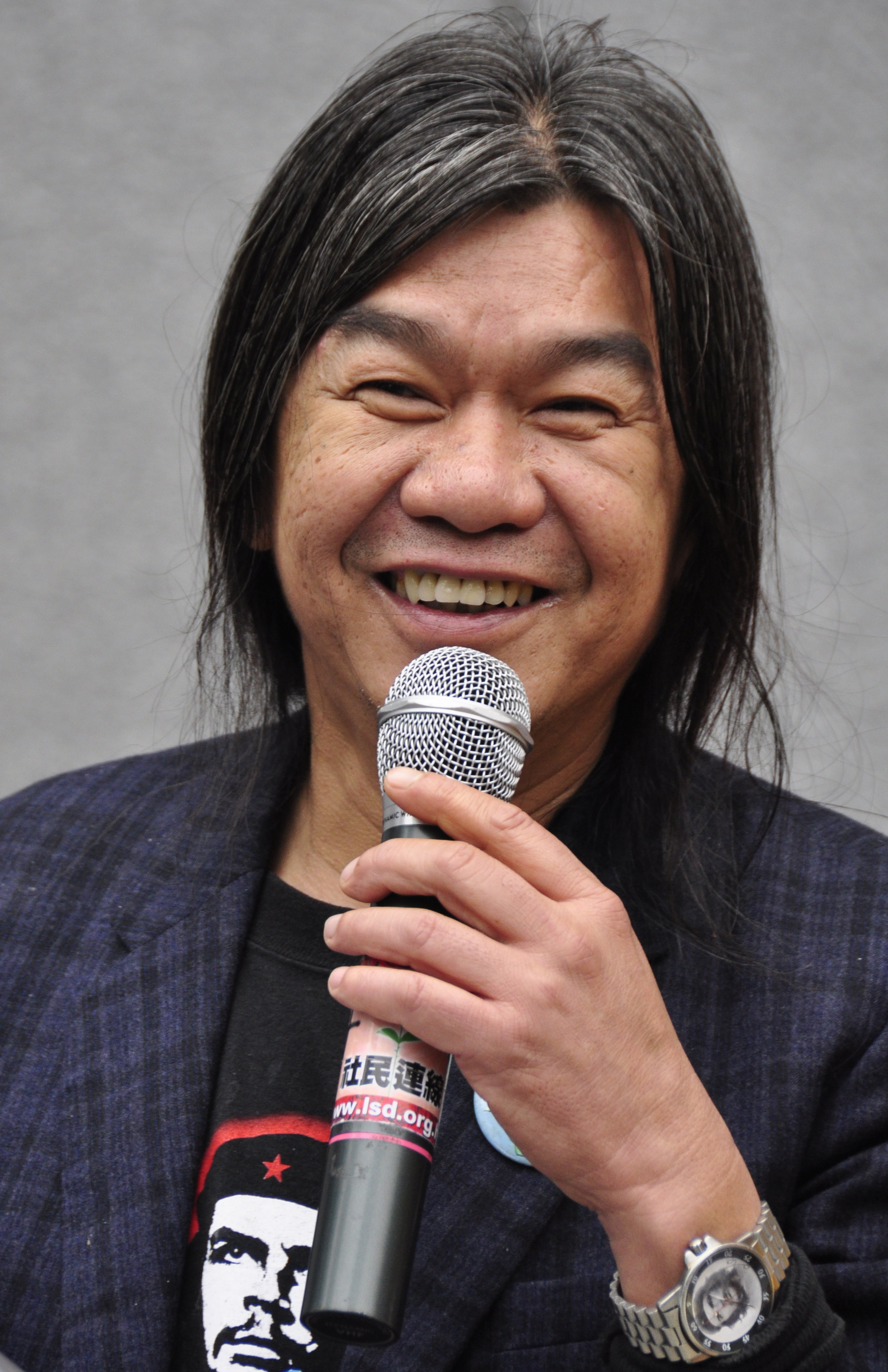
Leung Kwok-hung, impeachment proposer

Less than a month later, the first ever impeachment motion was moved by Leung Kwok-hung from League of Social Democrats amid the scandal of illegal structures. Leung Kwok-hung accused the Chief Executive of lying and misleading the public. The motion includes charges laid down against Leung Chun-ying for: (Note: Excerpt of the motion reads: Whereas not less than one-fourth of all the Members of this Council have jointly initiated this motion charging the Chief Executive Mr LEUNG Chun Ying with serious breaches of law and/or dereliction of duty (as particularized in the Schedule and Annexes appended to this motion); and whereas the said Mr LEUNG Chun Ying has refused to resign within a reasonable time, this Council, in accordance with Article 73(9) of the Basic Law, hereby gives a mandate to the Chief Justice of the Court of Final Appeal to form and chair an independent investigation committee to investigate the alleged serious breaches of law and/or dereliction of duty and report its findings to this Council.)

- Intentionally giving false statements and answers in this Council in dereliction of the constitutional duty under Articles 60(1) and 64 of the Basic Law to be accountable to this council as the head of the Government of the HKSAR.
- Engaging in a course of conduct in serious breach of Article 47(1) of the Basic Law.
- Serious breach of law by culpable misconduct in public office in directing, causing, authorizing or permitting the Office of the Chief Executive-elect to make false and/or misleading statements in response to public inquiry.

The motion was once again defeated in the indirectly elected functional constituencies despite securing a simple majority in directly elected seats.

In October 2013, another no-confidence vote, (Note: The motion reads: That this Council has no confidence in the Chief Executive, Mr LEUNG Chun-ying.) by Kwok Ka-ki (Civic) accusing Leung Chun-ying for "tearing apart the society", was defeated. The government by then was hit by multiple scandals and under public pressure amid the rejection of HKTV's TV licence application and the aftermath of Manila hostage crisis and of Lamma Island ferry collision.

=== 6th Legislative Council ===
In the last months of Leung's tenure, Alvin Yeung (Civic) tabled impeachment motion (Note: Excerpt of the motion reads: Wheresa not less than one-fourth of all the Members of this Council have jointly initiated this motion charging the Chief Executive Mr LEUNG Chun-ying with serious breach of law and/or dereliction of duty (as particularized in the Schedule and Annex appended to this motion), and whereas the said Mr LEUNG Chun-ying has refused to resign within a reasonable time, this Council, in accordance with Article 73(9) of the Basic Law, hereby gives a mandate to the Chief Justice of the Court of Final Appeal to form and chair an independent investigation committee to investigate the alleged serious breaches of law and/or dereliction of duty and report its findings to this Council.) for "contempt of the Legislative Council by improperly interfering with the affairs of the Select Committee of this Council in dereliction of his constitutional duty as the head of the Hong Kong Special Administrative Region under Articles 47, 60 and 64 of the Basic Law", in response to alleged meddling in the council's probe on Leung–UGL agreement. The investigation motion did not pass the required threshold.

On 12 July 2018, the Council voted down a motion of no-confidence against President of the council, Andrew Leung, whom Joseph Lee (Ind.), the proposer, accused of cloture on important matters.

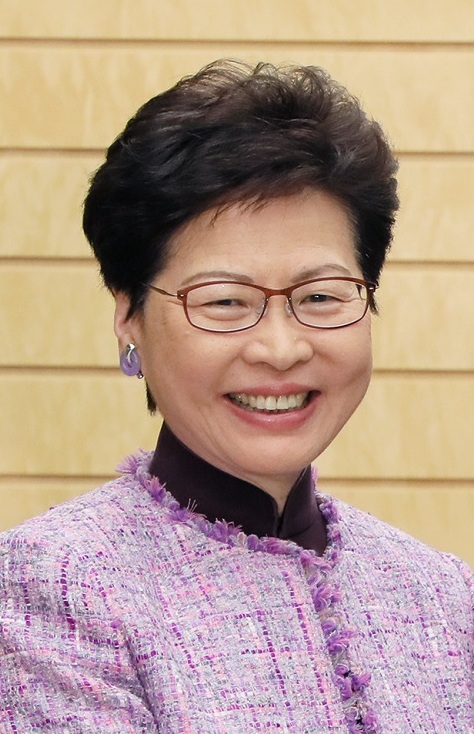
Carrie Lam, Chief Executive

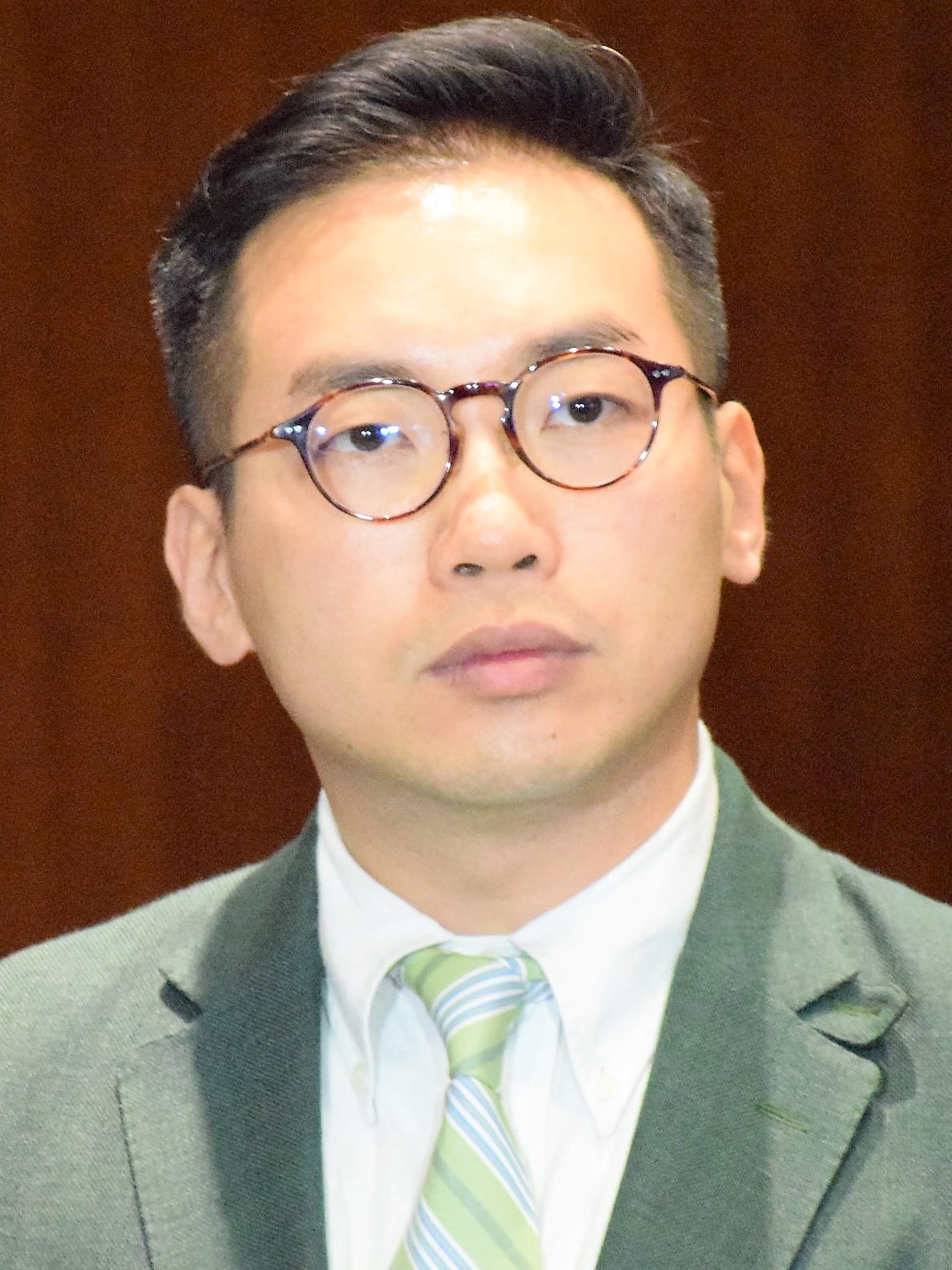
Alvin Yeung, impeachment proposer

In early 2019, the popularity of Carrie Lam's government had dropped to an all-time low due to controversies of the extradition bill. Andrew Wan (Democratic) proposed a no-confidence motion for manifesto breach, disqualifying MPs, co-location arrangement of West Kowloon station, "politically-motivated cases", and other issues. Claudia Mo from HK First tabled an amendment that explicitly states the extradition bill as the main reason. For the first time, the no-confidence motion, along with the amendment, were defeated in both GCs and FCs. Luk Chung-hung became the first pro-Beijing MP voting for no-confidence motion after "accidentally" casting the vote, who apologised for the mistake.

Dennis Kwok (Civic) further proposed a no-confidence motion on the whole government, (Note: The motion reads: That this Council has no confidence in the Fifth Term Government of the Hong Kong Special Administrative Region.) which Claudia Mo moved an amendment, (Note: The motion as amended reads: That the Fifth Term Government of the Hong Kong Special Administrative Region (‘the Fifth Term SAR Government’) has failed to command public support for a number of policies and in particular, it has acted ineptly and indecisively in handling the Fugitive Offenders and Mutual Legal Assistance in Criminal Matters Legislation (Amendment) Bill 2019 (‘the Bill’), and even bypassed the normal procedures of scrutinizing the Bill by the Bills Committee and demanded that the Second Reading debate on the Bill be resumed at a Legislative Council meeting; the Fifth Term SAR Government has administered Hong Kong with executive hegemony and incessantly damaged the rule of law and the relationship between the Executive and the Legislature of Hong Kong, resulting in its failure to govern Hong Kong effectively and uphold the civil rights and well-being of Hong Kong people; in this connection, this Council has no confidence in the Fifth Term SAR Government.) but was not debated as parliament term expired.

Following violent scenes in protest later the year, the Council in December 2019 debated another impeachment motion against Carrie Lam, (Note: Excerpt of the motion reads: Whereas not less than one-fourth of all Members of this Council have jointly initiated this motion charging the Chief Executive Mrs Carrie LAM CHENG Yuet-ngor with serious breach of law and/or dereliction of duty (as particularized in the Schedule to this motion), and whereas the said Mrs Carrie LAM CHENG Yuet-ngor has refused to resign within a reasonable time, this Council, in accordance with Article 73(9) of the Basic Law, hereby gives a mandate to the Chief Justice of the Court to form and chair an independent investigation committee to investigate the alleged serious breaches of law and/or dereliction of duty and report its findings to this Council.) with charges of:

- Disregard of mainstream opposing views and unrelentingly pushing through a highly controversial bill
- Use of excessive force to crack down on peaceful assembly
- Intimidating protestors with disproportionate criminal charges
- Causing a rift in society

The motion, proposed in June but delayed due to storming by protestors, was defeated as expected, but with a smaller margin than in May.

== See also ==
- Motion of no confidence
