= Henry Butters =

Scottish colonial civil servant

Henry Robert Butters
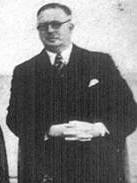

Financial Secretary of Hong Kong
- In office 20 June 1940 – 25 December 1941
- Governor: Sir Geoffry Northcote; Mark Aitchison Young
- Preceded by: Sydney Caine
- Succeeded by: Geoffrey Follows

Labour Officer
- In office 1938–1939
- Governor: Sir Geoffry Northcote
- Preceded by: New position
- Succeeded by: Edward Irvine Wynne-Jones

Personal details
- Born: 11 April 1898 Glasgow, Scotland
- Died: 1 March 1985 (aged 86) Stirling, Scotland
- Spouse: Jean Bain
- Children: 3
- Education: University of Glasgow
- Occupation: Civil servant

Henry Robert Butters (11 April 1898 – 1 March 1985) was a Scottish colonial civil servant. He was the first Labour Officer of Hong Kong and Financial Secretary of Hong Kong from 1939 to 1941.

== Biography ==
Butters was born in Glasgow, Scotland on 11 April 1898. He was educated at the Glasgow High School and won a scholarship to the Glasgow University in 1916. He joined the Eastern cadetship and was appointed to Hong Kong in 1922. He served as District Officer North, Assistant Secretary for Chinese Affairs, Deputy Clerk of Councils and Assistant Colonial Secretary. He was appointed police magistrate on five occasions in the New Territories, Kowloon and Hong Kong Island. He also took the law examinations and was called to the Bar at Gray's Inn. In 1934 Governor Sir William Peel singled him out for praise in the Legislative Council for his work on the budget.

Butters was appointed by Sir Geoffry Northcote the first Labour Officer of Hong Kong when the Hong Kong government was under pressure from London to give attention to the Chinese child labour. Butters completed a comprehensive study entitled Report on Labour and Labour Conditions in Hong Kong, the first report in Hong Kong labour history. In the report, Butters argued for more support of the workers and prosed the expansion of labour welfare legislations to include a variety of occupational diseases in the proposed Workmen's Compensation Ordinance. He also acknowledged the prevalence of tuberculosis and the problem of opium or heroin addiction among the working poor. He drafted two bills, a Trade Union Ordinance and a Trade Boards Ordinance, in which the latter was passed in 1940 but the earlier was not enacted.

In December 1939, he succeeded Sydney Caine as the second Financial Secretary of Hong Kong. During his tenure, he amended the Wall Revenue Ordinance to raise revenue in the preparation for the Japanese aggression. He went on leave in 1941, travelling to America and returned to Hong Kong in November, five weeks before the Japanese invasion. He was one of the civilian defenders during the Battle of Hong Kong in 1941 and was interned in the Stanley Internment Camp.

Butters was sent home to recuperate after the war and Geoffrey Follows arrived as financial advisor to the military administration, who later replaced him as the Financial Secretary. He was subsequently assigned to Nyasaland and Colonial Office in 1947 as assistant secretary to head the Finance Department. He retired in 1949 at the age of 50.

Butters married Jean Bain in 1926 and had two daughters and a son. He died in Stirling, Scotland on 1 March 1985 at the age of 86.

Government offices
New title	Labour Officer of Hong Kong; 1938–1949	Succeeded by Edward Irvine Wynne-Jones
Preceded by Sydney Caine	Financial Secretary of Hong Kong; 1939–1941	Vacant Title next held by Geoffrey Follows
