= John Cowperthwaite =

British colonial administrator

The Honourable Sir John Cowperthwaite KBE CMG

Financial Secretary of Hong Kong
- In office 17 April 1961 – 30 June 1971
- Monarch: Elizabeth II
- Governor: Sir Robert Black; Sir David Trench
- Preceded by: Arthur Grenfell Clarke
- Succeeded by: Charles Philip Haddon-Cave

Personal details
- Born: 25 April 1915 Edinburgh, Scotland, United Kingdom
- Died: 21 January 2006 (aged 90) Ninewells Hospital, Dundee, Scotland, United Kingdom
- Spouse: Sheila Mary Thomson
- Children: John James Hamish Cowperthwaite
- Education: Merchiston Castle School; St Andrews University; Christ's College, Cambridge

John Cowperthwaite
- Traditional Chinese: 郭伯偉
Transcriptions
Yue: Cantonese
- Yale Romanization: Gwok Baak Wáih
- Jyutping: gwok^{3} baak^{3} wai^{5}

Sir John James Cowperthwaite, KBE, CMG (Chinese: 郭伯偉爵士; 25 April 1915 – 21 January 2006), was a British civil servant who served as Financial Secretary of Hong Kong from 1961 to 1971. His introduction of free-market economic policies is widely credited with turning postwar Hong Kong into a thriving global financial centre. During Cowperthwaite's tenure as Financial Secretary, real wages in Hong Kong rose by 50%, and the portion of the population in acute poverty fell from 50% to 15%.

== Early years ==
Cowperthwaite was born on 25 April 1915 in Edinburgh to John Cowperthwaite, a surveyor of taxes, and Jessie Jarvis. He attended Merchiston Castle School in Edinburgh, Scotland, and later studied classics at St Andrews University and Christ's College, Cambridge. In 1940, he returned to St Andrews and gained a first class degree in economics on an accelerated one year degree programme with Professor James Nisbet. He joined the British Colonial Administrative Service as a Hong Kong Cadet in 1941, but during World War II was posted to Sierra Leone instead because of the Japanese invasion of Hong Kong.

== Hong Kong ==
He arrived in Hong Kong in 1945 and was assigned to the Department of Supplies, Trade and Industry. Cowperthwaite built on the economic policies of his predecessors, Arthur Clarke and Geoffrey Follows, promoting free trade, low taxation, budget surpluses, limited state intervention in the economy, a distrust of industrial planning, and sound money. It was a policy mix that drew more on Adam Smith and Gladstone than on Keynes and Attlee. However, Cowperthwaite was a pragmatic civil servant rather than a theoretician and he based his policies on his experience, empirical data and what he believed would work in practice.

He refused to compile GDP statistics arguing that such data was not useful to managing an economy and would lead to officials meddling in the economy. He was once asked what the key thing that poor countries could do to improve their growth. Cowperthwaite replied:

They should abolish the office of national statistics.

According to Catherine R. Schenk, Cowperthwaite's policies helped it to develop from one of the poorest places on earth to one of the wealthiest and most prosperous: "Low taxes, lax employment laws, absence of government debt, and free trade are all pillars of the Hong Kong experience of economic development." The Economic Freedom of the World 2015 Report ranks Hong Kong as both the freest economy in the world, a distinction it has held since this index began ranking countries in 1975, and among the most prosperous.

Throughout the 1960s, Cowperthwaite refused to implement free universal primary education, contributing to relatively high illiteracy rates in today's older generation. Compulsory education was only introduced under the governorship of Sir Murray MacLehose the next decade. At a time when Hong Kong's roads were crippled by traffic congestion, Cowperthwaite also steadfastly opposed construction of the Mass Transit Railway, a costly undertaking which was nevertheless built following his retirement. It would later become one of the world's most heavily utilised (and profitable) railways.

In 1960, he was appointed as an Officer of the Most Excellent Order of the British Empire (OBE) and, in 1964, a Companion of the Most Distinguished Order of Saint Michael and Saint George (CMG). He later became a Knight Commander of the Most Excellent Order of the British Empire (KBE) in 1968.

Commentators have credited his management of the economy of Hong Kong as a leading example of how small government encourages growth.

== Post–civil service career ==
After leaving his retirement, he was international adviser to Jardine Fleming, the Hong Kong–based investment bank until 1981. He retired and left Hong Kong for St Andrews, Scotland and became a member of The Royal and Ancient Golf Club of St Andrews.

== Personal life and death ==
He married Sheila Thomson in 1941. They had one son. He died in Scotland on 21 January 2006, aged 90.

== See also ==
- Economy of Hong Kong
- Milton Friedman
- Positive non-interventionism

Government offices
Preceded by Arthur Grenfell Clarke	Financial Secretary of Hong Kong; 1961–1971	Succeeded by Sir Charles Philip Haddon-Cave
