= John Henry Bremridge =

British politician (1925–1994)

Sir John Henry Bremridge

Financial Secretary of Hong Kong
- In office 1 June 1981 – 31 May 1986
- Preceded by: Sir Philip Haddon-Cave
- Succeeded by: Sir Piers Jacobs

Personal details
- Born: 12 July 1925 Transvaal, Union of South Africa
- Died: 6 May 1994 (aged 68) London, England
- Parent: Godfrey Bremridge (1895–1941) (father)

Sir John Henry Bremridge (彭勵治爵士), KBE, JP (12 July 1925 – 6 May 1994) was Financial Secretary of Hong Kong from 1981 to 1986. He was the first Financial Secretary who was not a civil servant.

== Early life ==
Bremridge was born in 1925 in Transvaal, in what was then the Union of South Africa to British parents (his father was Godfrey Bremridge) on an orange farm, but left in 1933 for Britain where he grew up.

== Career ==
He served in the British Army (Rifle Brigade (Prince Consort's Own)) from 1943 to 1947, and read law at Oxford before joining Swire in 1949, where he was a senior member of staff in John Swire and Sons (Hong Kong) (Swire Group) and held various positions on corporate boards:

- Chairman, Swire Pacific Limited 1973–1980
- Chairman, Cathay Pacific Airways Limited 1973–1980
- Non-executive Director, Schroders plc 1987–1989
- Director, John Swire and Sons 1987

== Hong Kong Government ==
In the 1980s he left the private sector to become Financial Secretary and remained until 1986 to return to the corporate world. During his tenure, he experienced the economic uncertainties that stemmed from the Sino-British negotiations that led to the signing of the Sino-British Joint Declaration. In order to stabilise the economy, he pegged the Hong Kong dollar to the United States dollar at a rate of HK$7.8 to US$1, thus instituting the linked exchange rate system in Hong Kong. Both Bremridge and his successor Piers Jacobs considered introducing a Sales Tax but had failed.

He contributed to the growth restrictions imposed on Dragonair, the second Hong Kong-based airline at that time, by introducing a "one route, one carrier" policy aimed at maintaining Cathay Pacific's local monopoly. Due to this policy, Dragonair shifted its focus to unserved secondary mainland China markets.

== Later life ==
Bremridge's health suffered after a fall in 1987 and never fully recovered, dying in 1994 in London. He was survived by his wife and children, Anne, Elizabeth, Charles and Henry.

Government offices
Preceded by Sir Charles Philip Haddon-Cave	Financial Secretary of Hong Kong; 1981–1986	Succeeded by Sir Piers Jacobs
