= Norman Gilbert Mitchell-Innes =

Norman Gilbert Mitchell-Innes, JP (1860–1913) was the Colonial Treasurer of Hong Kong.

Mitchell-Innes was born in 1860 in Gloucestershire. He was acting Registrar General in 1889 and 1890, the Colonial Treasurer of Hong Kong from 1891 to 1895 and the Inspector of Prisons from 1910.

Government offices
Preceded by Alfred Lister	Colonial Treasurer of Hong Kong; 1891–1896	Succeeded by Thomas Sercombe Smith
