= James Wilke Nisbet =

Scottish economist

James Wilkie Nisbet (1903–1974) was a Scottish economist. He gained a double first in economic science and philosophy, and an LLB with distinction at the University of Glasgow. Between 1926 and 1931 he served as assistant to W. R. Scott, the Adam Smith Professor of Political Economy at the University of Glasgow.

After he moved to St Andrews University in 1935 as a lecturer in political economy, he was promoted to reader in 1938 and professor in 1947. He was a classical economist and a believer in free trade. He published his first book, A Case for Laissez-Faire, in 1929. He also wrote on banking and finance and on how to improve living standards. His students included Sir Alan Peacock, later Professor of Economics at the University of York, and Sir John Cowperthwaite, who was Financial Secretary of Hong Kong (1961–71). Alan Peacock described Nisbet as a wide-ranging thinker whose course in Political Economy "with its strong emphasis on the historical and political background to economic policy has not only offered a useful general education to generations of non-specialists but has also taught the would-be professional economist that he must take some responsibility for devising realistic policy measures."

Nisbet retired in 1970 and died in 1974.
