= Philip Haddon-Cave =

British colonial administrator (1925–1999)

Sir Philip Haddon-Cave KBE CMG

Governor of Hong Kong
- Acting
- In office 8 May 1982 – 20 May 1982
- Monarch: Elizabeth II
- Chief Secretary: Himself
- Preceded by: Sir Murray MacLehose
- Succeeded by: Sir Edward Youde

Chief Secretary of Hong Kong
- In office 20 November 1981 – 9 June 1985
- Monarch: Elizabeth II
- Governor: Murray MacLehose; Edward Youde
- Preceded by: Sir Jack Cater
- Succeeded by: Sir David Akers-Jones

Financial Secretary of Hong Kong
- In office 1 July 1971 – 31 May 1981
- Monarch: Elizabeth II
- Governor: David Trench; Murray MacLehose
- Preceded by: John Cowperthwaite
- Succeeded by: John Henry Bremridge

Personal details
- Born: 6 July 1925 Hobart, Tasmania, Australia
- Died: 27 September 1999 (aged 74) Oxford, Oxfordshire, England
- Spouse: Elizabeth Alice Simpson (m. 1948)
- Children: 3, including Charles Haddon-Cave
- Education: University of Tasmania; King's College, Cambridge
- Occupation: Colonial administrator

Philip Haddon-Cave
- Traditional Chinese: 夏鼎基
Transcriptions
Yue: Cantonese
- Yale Romanization: Hah Díng gēi
- Jyutping: Haa^{6} Ding^{2} gei^{1}

Sir Charles Philip Haddon-Cave, KBE CMG (Chinese: 夏鼎基; 6 July 1925 – 27 September 1999) was an Australian-born British colonial administrator. He was the Financial Secretary of Hong Kong from 1971 to 1981 and the Chief Secretary of Hong Kong from 1981 to 1985. During his tenure of Financial Secretary, he famously coined the term "positive non-interventionism" as its chief principle, which has had a long-lasting effect on Hong Kong and world's economic philosophy.

== Early life and government career ==
Haddon-Cave was born in Hobart, Tasmania, Australia, son of Francis MacNamara Haddon-Cave. He had a brother, David, and sister, Pamela. He was educated at the University of Tasmania and King's College, Cambridge. He joined the British Colonial Service in 1952 was assigned to Kenya, British East Africa. In 1961, he was appointed Financial Secretary in the Seychelles. In 1963, he was transferred to work in the Hong Kong government, working in the Department of Trade and Industry. In 1965, he became the Director of Trade and Industry and was promoted Deputy Secretary of Economy. In 1969, he was appointed Deputy Financial Secretary.

== Financial Secretary of Hong Kong ==
He became the Financial Secretary of Hong Kong in 1971, succeeding Sir John Cowperthwaite. Contrast to his predecessor, he was known to be willing to discuss budgetary and monetary policies. He recognised a broader responsibility for the government in economy. He noted that the Hong Kong government's attitude to the economy "is frequently but inadequately described as laissez-faire." He preferred to describe its stance as one of the "positive non-interventionism" in his Budget Speech in 1980, in which the government should not "plan the allocation of resources available to the private sector and to frustrate the operation of market forces", the private sector should accept and bear the costs of its own mistake; and the government had certain specific obligations. First it recognised its budgetary and fiscal policies would affect the entire economy and that it had a responsibility to intervene in a limited fashion. Second the government should be prepared to exercise guidance and impose restraints on banking and securities. Third, it was responsible for establishing advisory bodies where private interest could be maximised and public interest secured. Fourth, the government should provide law and order, defence, preventative health measures, fire services, sanitation and a basic network of roads and drainage and fund the services of housing, education, medical and health services and social welfare.

In 1972, the Hong Kong dollar slumped to the bottom of its band against the US dollar, but Hong Kong did not have US dollar reserves to defend the rate. The government was forced to sell sterling for US dollars to then buy Hong Kong dollars to support the rate. In July 1973, the Hong Kong dollar was dragged down against sterling due to the continued devaluation of the US dollar as a result of the outflow of capital from Hong Kong. In August 1973, Governor Murray MacLehose and Haddon-Cave attempted to end the historic commitment to sterling reserves but the idea was rejected by London. The British government offered a unilateral agreement in return to guarantee sterling balances at a new slightly higher rate. In July 1974 the price of US$1 fell below HK$5.05 which force Haddon-Cave to announce the Hong Kong dollar to float free from its link to the US dollar on 27 November. However, the floating exchange caused the serious problem of inflation in the 1970s in an annual rate of 9.5%. He followed Cowperthwaite line to insist the colony did not need active monetary policies because of the economy's automatic adjustment mechanism although he later came close to admit that the era of automatic adjustment was over.

During his tenure of Financial Secretary, Haddon-Cave was concerned about the massive growth of government spending under MacLehose administration. The government projected a three years substantial government deficits, in which Haddon-Cave described as "clearly quite unacceptable". He proposed several tax reforms to increase the government income and change the lack of progressivity in the system. In his 1973 Budget Speech, Haddon-Cave announced his intention to "restore" the profits tax as he deemed that "Court decisions have shown that a business Hong Kong doing exactly what it was set up to do in Hong Kong and nowhere else can have business income derived from outside Hong Kong, coming from no conduct of business outside Hong Kong, and escaping charge." He repeated his intention in the 1974 and 1975 Budget Speeches although no policies were implemented, which was thought to face the opposition from the business interests.

Haddon-Cave also proposed tax on dividends, following Cowperthwaite had proposed a decade earlier. A Third Inland Revenue Ordinance Review Committee was set up to investigate over the matter in 1976. Although Haddon-Cave endorsed the Report to the Commissioner of Inland Revenue, the Committee's proposal to tax dividends was eventually abandoned, due to the opposition of the unofficial members of the Legislative Council. Only the recommendation of increased rate of profits tax for corporations was adopted, which left the geographical scope of profits tax remained narrow.

For his services, he was awarded Commander of the Order of St Michael and St George (CMG) in 1973, and knighted with the Order of the British Empire (KBE) in 1980.

== Chief Secretary of Hong Kong ==
Haddon-Cave was appointed Chief Secretary of Hong Kong in 1981. In his tenure, he oversaw the massive district administration reform under the District Administration Scheme. He helped establishing the District Boards and the first District Board elections in 1982 and the second elections in 1985. He also oversaw the establishment of the Provisional Regional Council. He also witnessed the Sino-British negotiations on the Hong Kong sovereignty after 1997, Prime Minister Margaret Thatcher visit to Beijing in September 1983 and the finalisation of the Sino-British Joint Declaration in December 1984. As Chief Secretary, he also acted as Governor of Hong Kong on several occasions.

== Personal life ==
He retired from public service in 1985. After leaving Hong Kong, he spent his retirement quietly in England. He died of heart attack while in a taxi near his retirement home in Oxford, England on 27 September 1999. He married Elizabeth Alice Simpson in 1948, who designed many of Hong Kong's commemorative coins, including the reverses of the "Return to China" set of 1997. The couple had two sons and one daughter. His youngest son Sir Charles Anthony was appointed to the High Court in 2011. Many of Haddon-Cave's family and relatives still live in Hong Kong, including younger son Francis who was called to the bar in 1999. He was also the grandfather of actress Jessie Cave, Sydney-based artist and property investor Ismay Haddon-Cave and television producer, Ali Haddon-Cave.,

Despite his long years of service in Hong Kong, Haddon-Cave was famous for his dislike of Chinese food, and at Chinese banquets, Haddon-Cave frequently insisted upon ordering steak.

== Legacy ==
Economist Milton Friedman hailed Haddon-Cave's "positive non-interventionism" as a fairly comprehensive implementation of laissez-faire policy. In his obituary, Haddon-Cave was regarded as "one of the architects of the stability and prosperity that the [Hong Kong] people enjoy now as an autonomous region of China." Although he attempted to reform the tax system, he was praised for "his disciplined intellectual approach to the task of balancing the economy...by keeping tax levels and public expenditure low."

== See also ==
- Profits tax in Hong Kong

Government offices
Preceded by Sir John Cowperthwaite	Financial Secretary of Hong Kong; 1971–1981	Succeeded by Sir J. H. Bremridge
Preceded by Sir Jack Cater	Chief Secretary of Hong Kong; 1981–1985	Succeeded by Sir David Akers-Jones
Preceded by Murray MacLehose	Administrator of Hong Kong; April–May 1982	Succeeded by Edward Youde
