= Alfred Lister =

Alfred Lister was the Registrar-General of Hong Kong and Colonial Treasurer of Hong Kong.

During his post as acting Registrar General, he visited the I-ts'z during an inspection. He was shocked by the poor condition of the house, which created a public scandal. Governor Richard Graves MacDonnell instructed Lister and other officers to clear out the building and sent the inmates to the Government Civil Hospital. Lister’s observations and misinterpretation of the conventional role of the I-ts’z meant that the colonial government’s policy of non-intervention in Chinese affairs was no longer feasible. A Commission of Inquiry included Lister was formed in May 1866 to investigate the possibility to form a Chinese hospital, which later became the Tung Wah Hospital. In 1883, he was appointed Colonial Treasurer of Hong Kong.

Government offices
| Preceded by James Russell | Colonial Treasurer of Hong Kong; 1883–1890 | Succeeded by Norman Gilbert Mitchell-Innes |
