= Thomas Sercombe Smith =

Thomas Sercombe Smith (1858 – 31 March 1937) was a British civil servant and judge. He was the Colonial Treasurer of Hong Kong and Puisne Judge of Supreme Court of the Straits Settlements.

Smith was born in Canton, China in 1858 to Rev. Samuel Joseph Smith of Chelmsford, Essex. He attended the Wesleyan College as a boarding pupil in 1871.

He was appointed a Hong Kong cadet in 1882. He was called to the bar at the Middle Temple in November 1893 and served as acting Registrar-General in 1895. He was Police Magistrate in 1899 and 1907. He left Hong Kong in 1907. He was appointed Colonial Treasurer of Hong Kong from 1897 to 1898. He was acting Colonial Secretary of Hong Kong in 1898. In 1874 he was secretary to the Retrenchment Committee, and assisted the Attorney-General in the Taipingshan Arbitration.

Smith became a Puisne Judge in 1904 and later served in the judiciary of Federated Malay States where he presided over Proudlock murder trial in 1911. He retired as Puisne Judge of the Supreme Court of the Straits Settlements.

He was also a cricketer.

Government offices
Preceded by Norman Gilbert Mitchell-Innes	Colonial Treasurer of Hong Kong; 1897–1898	Succeeded by Alexander MacDonald Thomson
