= Godfrey Bremridge =

British flying ace

- Born: 1 March 1895; Winkleigh, Devon, England
- Died: 12 September 1941 (aged 46); Sywell, Northamptonshire, England
- Relatives: John Henry Bremridge (son)
- Military career
- Allegiance: United Kingdom
- Branch: British Army; Royal Air Force
- Rank: Flight Lieutenant
- Service number: 70081
- Unit: No. 65 Squadron RFC/No. 65 Squadron RAF
- Awards: Air Force Cross
- Other work: Pilot Instructor during World War II

Flight Lieutenant Godfrey Bremridge AFC (1 March 1895 – 12 September 1941) was a World War I flying ace who was credited with five victories.

== Early life ==
On 1 March 1895, Bremridge was born in Winkleigh, Devon, England. His father was Reverend Henry Bremridge (1854–1913), vicar of Winkleigh. His mother was Dora Milne (1860–1895). Four weeks after his birth, his mother died. Bremridge was the second son. His elder brother was James Philip Alfred Bremridge, a Royal Navy officer. Before Bremridge was born, his sister Mildred Constance died in February 1895 at age two.

== Career ==
Bremridge enlisted into the army, serving in the Army Service Corps in Egypt in 1914–15. At some point he returned to England, and transferred to the Royal Flying Corps where he was appointed a probationary temporary second lieutenant on 2 July 1917, being confirmed in the rank on 6 September 1917. Assigned to No. 65 Squadron, flying the Sopwith Camel, between 18 December 1917 and 9 March 1918 he drove down three enemy aircraft, and destroyed two others, and had a "share" of three victories with other pilots. He was promoted to acting-captain on 1 August 1918, and was awarded the Air Force Cross on 1 January 1919.

After the war he emigrated to the Transvaal in South Africa where he started an orange farm, and became the father of two daughters and a son, John Henry, but returned to England in the mid-1930s. On 12 December 1935 he joined the Royal Air Force Volunteer Reserve, where he was granted a commission as Flying Officer Class "C". On 22 January 1936 Bremridge, then living in Weybridge, Surrey, and Bernard L. Bremridge, a solicitor from Winchester, founded Weybridge Air Services Ltd., a private company, to "carry on the business of carriers of passengers, goods and mails in aeroplanes, etc." However, on 26 April 1937 Bremridge was appointed manager of the sales department at Brooklands Aero Club, where he also worked as a flying instructor.

During the Second World War he served as a pilot instructor.

=== List of aerial victories ===
No.	Date	Time	Aircraft	Foe	Location	Notes
1	18 December 1917	14:15	Sopwith Camel s/n B6335	Albatros D.V	Roulers	Shared with Lt G. Knocker.
2	28 December 1917	11:15	Sopwith Camel s/n B5597	C type	Northwest of Houthulst Wood	Shared with Lt C. B Matthews. The name ‘C type’ most likely refers to either an Aviatik C.I or a LVG.
3	25 January 1918	12:45	Sopwith Camel s/n B5597	C type	Warneton	The name ‘C type’ most likely refers to either an Aviatik C.I or a LVG.
4	3 February 1918	10:35	Sopwith Camel s/n B5597	Albatros D.V	Southwest of Roulers	
5	9 March 1918	16:40	Sopwith Camel s/n B5597	Fokker Dr.I	Westrozebeke	

== Personal ==
=== Death ===
Bremridge was killed in a flying accident on 12 September 1941. He was buried at the churchyard of St Peter & St Paul at Sywell, Northamptonshire. Bremridge's brother James Philip Alfred Bremridge joined the Royal Navy, rising to the rank of lieutenant-commander before dying aboard HMS Delhi in 1926, and is buried in Kalkara Naval Cemetery in Malta.

== Bibliography ==
- Shores, Christopher F.; Franks, Norman; Guest, Russell (1990). Above the Trenches: A Complete Record of the Fighter Aces and Units of the British Empire Air Forces 1915-1920. London, UK: Grub Street. ISBN 0-948817-19-4.
