= Arthur Grenfell Clarke =

British civil servant in Hong Kong (1906–1993)

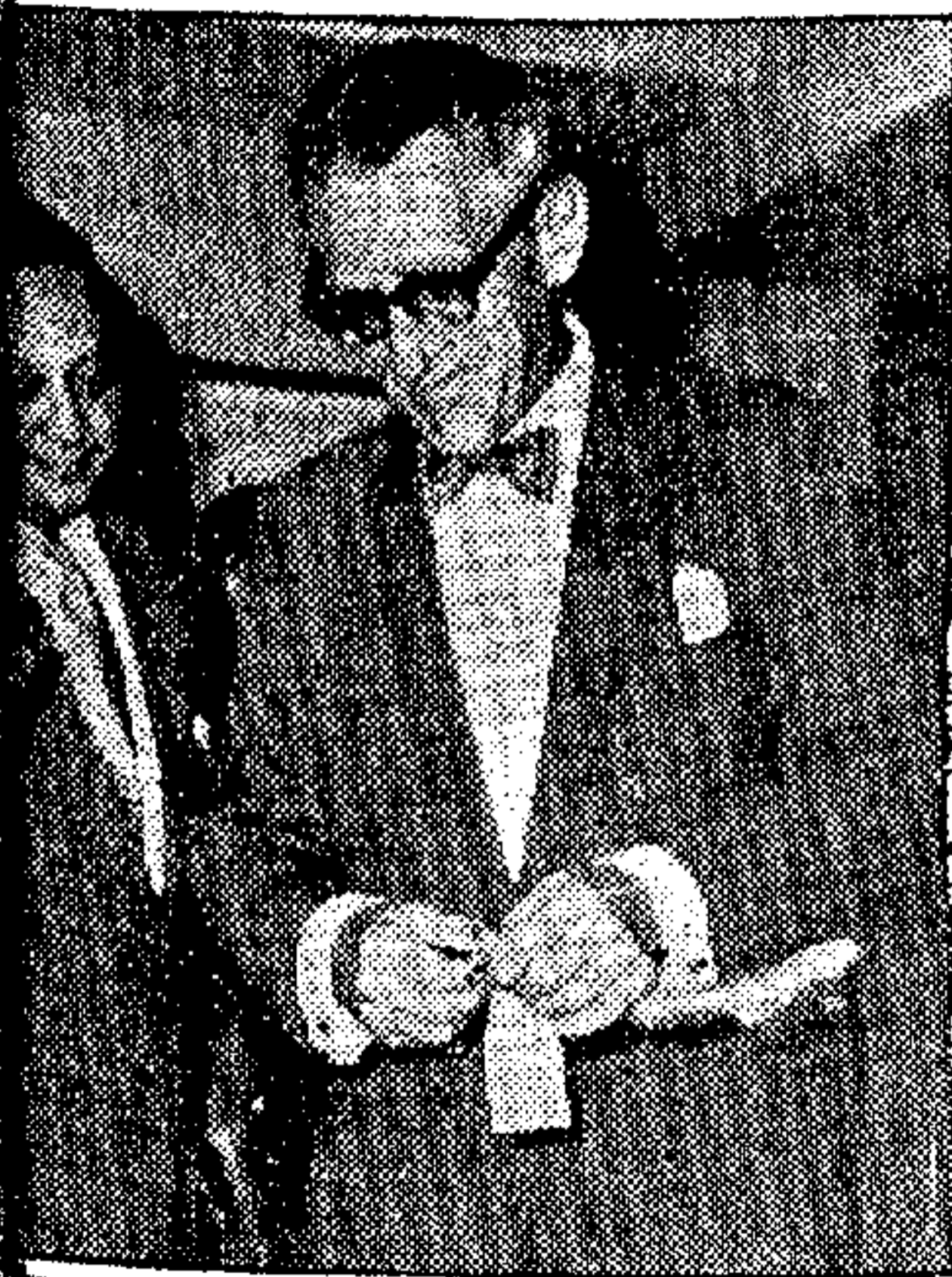
Arthur Grenfell Clarke

Arthur Grenfell Clarke CMG (Chinese: 歧樂嘉; 17 August 1906 – 15 August 1993) was a British civil servant in Hong Kong who rose to hold the position of Financial Secretary from 1952–61. He was the first of three successive financial secretaries whose support for free market economic policies helped turn postwar Hong Kong into a thriving economy.

== Early years ==
Clarke was born in Athlone, United Kingdom of Great Britain and Ireland, to English parents Harry and Susan (Garty) Clarke. He was educated at Mountjoy School, Dublin and Trinity College, Dublin. He came to Hong Kong in 1929. From 1940 to 1941, in the period up to the Japanese invasion, he was Commissioner of War Taxation.

After the war, he became Deputy Financial Secretary, holding the post from 1945 to 1951. He then took over as Financial Secretary when his predecessor, Sir Geoffrey Follows, retired at the end of 1951.

== As Financial Secretary ==
Clarke oversaw Hong Kong's finances during a period of dramatic economic growth and an expansion of government reach, which had previously played a skeletal role in the lives of most Hong Kong residents. Nevertheless, like most of his predecessors and successors, he believed the government should exercise minimal intervention in the territory's practical economic activity.

He held the post of Financial Secretary during the 1953 Shek Kip Mei Fire, which led to the government's rapid introduction of a public housing programme: within three years some 200,000 people were so accommodated. Public spending increased from HK$285 million in 1952, when Clarke took up the post, to $1,072 million in 1961 when he left. Nevertheless, taxes were not raised—the standard rate remained at 12.5 percent throughout his tenure—yet the government’s finances were consistently in surplus due to Hong Kong’s growing economy. Indeed, the territory’s reserves increased from $219 million to $412 million under his stewardship.

Like his two successors, Clarke tried unsuccessfully to introduce a normal (full, schedular) income tax.

In 1961, he raised property tax from 6.25 percent to 12.5 percent, following a failed attempt seven years earlier, under opposition from the Chinese business community.

== Farewell ==
In his final budget speech, on 1 March 1961, Clarke offered advice that highlights the success of post-war Hong Kong:

"I expect, too, that my successor will make exactly the same mistake that I have always made. He will underestimate revenue. He will underestimate his revenue, because, like me, like so many of us, he will never be able to comprehend how new and successful industries can be created overnight out of nothing, in the face of every possible handicap; how new trade can suddenly start up in some way that has never been thought of before; he, like me, will never be able to comprehend how on earth our enterprising, ingenious, hardworking people can ever manage to accomplish so much with so little."

He died in Foxrock, Dublin in 1993.

== Recognition ==
Clarke was made a Companion of the Order of St Michael and St George in 1953.

Preceded by: Sir Geoffrey Follows	Financial Secretary of Hong Kong; 1952-1961	Succeeded by: Sir John Cowperthwaite
