= Opinion polling on the Lam government =

Opinion polling on the Carrie Lam government of Hong Kong was conducted regularly by pollsters over the course of Lam's five-year term.

== Background ==
Carrie Lam was elected as Chief Executive in 2017, and started her five-year term on 1 July 2017.

Pollsters in Hong Kong that have regular opinion polling on the governance are: Hong Kong Public Opinion Research Institute (HKPORI); Public Opinion Programme, the University of Hong Kong (HKUPOP), the predecessor of HKPORI which ceased operation on 30 June 2019; Hong Kong Institute of Asia-Pacific Studies (HKIAPS).

== Polling on Chief Executive ==
=== Survey questions ===
- On approval percentage:
  - HKPORI and its predecessor HKUPOP: "If a general election of the Chief Executive were to be held tomorrow, and you had the right to vote, would you vote for Carrie Lam?"
  - HKIAPS: "Carrie Lam is already elected as the new Chief Executive, to what extent do you support her as a Chief Executive? Is it 'Do not support', 'in-between', or 'support'?"
- On support rating:
  - HKPORI and its predecessor HKUPOP: "Please use a scale of 0-100 to rate your extent of support to the Chief Executive (or Chief Executive-elect) Carrie Lam, with 0 indicating absolutely not supportive, 100 indicating absolutely supportive and 50 indicating half-half. How would you rate the Chief Executive (or Chief Executive-elect) Carrie Lam?"
  - HKIAPS: "In general, with 0 indicating lowest mark, 100 indicating highest mark, 50 indicating passing mark, how would you rate the Chief Executive (or Chief Executive-elect) Carrie Lam on her overall performance?"

=== Notes ===
- Option of the "Others" below refers to "Don't know" and "Hard to say" for HKPORI and HKUPOP surveys; "In-between", "Don't know" and "Hard to say" for HKIAPS.
- Surveys conducted before 1 July 2017 were before Carrie Lam assumed office.

=== Graphical summary ===
View source data.
View source data.

=== Statistical table ===
| Date(s) conducted between | | Conducted by | Sample size | Approve | Disapprove | Others | Net | Sample size | Rating |
|---|---|---|---|---|---|---|---|---|---|
| 2022-05-31 | 2022-06-05 | HKPORI | 1,000 | 17% | 77% | 6% | -60% | 988 | 36.0 |
| 2022-05-27 | 2022-06-14 | HKIAPS | – | – | – | – | – | 692 | 34.6 |
| 2022-04-30 | 2022-05-06 | HKPORI | 1,000 | 14% | 78% | 9% | -64% | 971 | 34.7 |
| 2022-04-21 | 2022-04-29 | HKIAPS | – | – | – | – | – | 691 | 33.6 |
| 2022-04-04 | 2022-04-07 | HKPORI | 1,014 | 13% | 78% | 9% | -65% | 980 | 33.4 |
4 April 2022 – Carrie Lam announced not to seek for second term
| 2022-03-07 | 2022-03-11 | HKPORI | 1,000 | 12% | 79% | 10% | -67% | 988 | 26.6 |
| 2022-02-07 | 2022-02-10 | HKPORI | 1,012 | 18% | 70% | 12% | -53% | 993 | 31.9 |
| 2022-01-10 | 2022-01-19 | HKIAPS | – | – | – | – | – | 686 | 33.3 |
| 2022-01-03 | 2022-01-06 | HKPORI | 1,021 | 19% | 67% | 15% | -48% | 1,007 | 33.8 |
January 2022 – Outbreak of the deadliest fifth wave of COVID pandemic
2022
| 2021-12-09 | 2021-12-14 | HKPORI | 1,017 | 21% | 63% | 17% | -42% | 1,000 | 35.8 |
| 2021-11-29 | 2021-12-08 | HKIAPS | – | – | – | – | – | 693 | 32.9 |
| 2021-11-29 | 2021-12-03 | HKPORI | 1,001 | 21% | 66% | 13% | -45% | 978 | 35.7 |
| 2021-11-15 | 2021-11-18 | HKPORI | 1,004 | 25% | 61% | 15% | -36% | 984 | 37.4 |
| 2021-10-29 | 2021-11-03 | HKPORI | 1,004 | 23% | 66% | 11% | -42% | 978 | 35.7 |
| 2021-10-18 | 2021-10-22 | HKPORI | 1,000 | 22% | 64% | 14% | -42% | 989 | 37.0 |
| 2021-10-04 | 2021-10-07 | HKPORI | 1,010 | 24% | 59% | 17% | -35% | 985 | 38.3 |
| 2021-09-16 | 2021-09-23 | HKPORI | 1,036 | 20% | 66% | 15% | -46% | 1,010 | 33.9 |
| 2021-09-16 | 2021-09-25 | HKIAPS | – | – | – | – | – | 698 | 31.0 |
| 2021-09-06 | 2021-09-10 | HKPORI | 1,000 | 24% | 65% | 12% | -41% | 991 | 35.6 |
| 2021-08-20 | 2021-08-26 | HKPORI | 1,003 | 20% | 68% | 13% | -48% | 982 | 33.8 |
| 2021-08-09 | 2021-08-12 | HKPORI | 1,002 | 20% | 66% | 14% | -46% | 991 | 35.1 |
| 2021-07-19 | 2021-07-22 | HKPORI | 1,000 | 20% | 68% | 12% | -48% | 989 | 34.7 |
| 2021-07-15 | 2021-07-26 | HKIAPS | – | – | – | – | – | 693 | 32.1 |
| 2021-06-30 | 2021-07-08 | HKPORI | 1,003 | 20% | 67% | 13% | -47% | 993 | 34.0 |
| 2021-06-21 | 2021-06-25 | HKPORI | 1,014 | 17% | 70% | 13% | -53% | 993 | 29.8 |
| 2021-06-11 | 2021-06-21 | HKIAPS | – | – | – | – | – | 683 | 29.3 |
| 2021-06-07 | 2021-06-10 | HKPORI | 1,008 | 16% | 70% | 15% | -54% | 997 | 30.3 |
| 2021-05-20 | 2021-05-27 | HKIAPS | – | – | – | – | – | 692 | 30.0 |
| 2021-05-17 | 2021-05-21 | HKPORI | 1,004 | 18% | 68% | 14% | -50% | 1,004 | 30.8 |
| 2021-05-03 | 2021-05-07 | HKPORI | 1,013 | 17% | 71% | 12% | -54% | 1,005 | 30.4 |
| 2021-04-19 | 2021-04-22 | HKPORI | 1,004 | 18% | 68% | 14% | -50% | 990 | 32.0 |
| 2021-04-16 | 2021-04-26 | HKIAPS | – | – | – | – | – | 692 | 28.4 |
| 2021-04-07 | 2021-04-09 | HKPORI | 1,003 | 21% | 67% | 12% | -47% | 987 | 30.7 |
| 2021-03-22 | 2021-03-25 | HKPORI | 1,010 | 19% | 68% | 13% | -50% | 994 | 32.8 |
| 2021-03-17 | 2021-03-24 | HKIAPS | – | – | – | – | – | 701 | 27.2 |
| 2021-03-08 | 2021-03-12 | HKPORI | 1,001 | 18% | 72% | 10% | -54% | 990 | 29.5 |
| 2021-02-24 | 2021-02-26 | HKPORI | 1,000 | 23% | 67% | 10% | -43% | 983 | 33.9 |
| 2021-02-19 | 2021-02-26 | HKIAPS | – | – | – | – | – | 696 | 26.9 |
| 2021-02-02 | 2021-02-05 | HKPORI | 1,018 | 18% | 70% | 13% | -52% | 1,009 | 31.0 |
| 2021-01-18 | 2021-01-22 | HKPORI | 1,011 | 21% | 69% | 10% | -49% | 991 | 32.0 |
| 2021-01-15 | 2021-01-22 | HKIAPS | – | – | – | – | – | 711 | 25.8 |
| 2021-01-04 | 2021-01-08 | HKPORI | 1,000 | 19% | 72% | 9% | -54% | 990 | 29.0 |
2021
| 2020-12-18 | 2020-12-22 | HKPORI | 1,014 | 18% | 69% | 12% | -51% | 998 | 29.7 |
| 2020-12-08 | 2020-12-15 | HKIAPS | – | – | – | – | – | 703 | 25.6 |
| 2020-12-07 | 2020-12-10 | HKPORI | 1,009 | 20% | 69% | 11% | -50% | 1,001 | 30.6 |
| 2020-11-23 | 2020-11-26 | HKPORI | 1,085 | 21% | 66% | 13% | -45% | 1,069 | 33.5 |
| 2020-11-16 | 2020-11-23 | HKIAPS | – | – | – | – | – | 692 | 26.1 |
| 2020-11-09 | 2020-11-13 | HKPORI | 1,005 | 21% | 69% | 10% | -48% | 1,001 | 30.8 |
| 2020-10-19 | 2020-10-22 | HKPORI | 1,020 | 18% | 74% | 8% | -56% | 1,012 | 27.3 |
| 2020-10-19 | 2020-10-23 | HKIAPS | – | – | – | – | – | 706 | 25.1 |
| 2020-10-05 | 2020-10-08 | HKPORI | 1,002 | 19% | 72% | 10% | -53% | 988 | 28.6 |
| 2020-09-21 | 2020-09-24 | HKPORI | 1,013 | 17% | 71% | 12% | -54% | 994 | 27.5 |
| 2020-09-18 | 2020-09-24 | HKIAPS | – | – | – | – | – | 729 | 24.5 |
| 2020-08-31 | 2020-09-04 | HKPORI | 1,007 | 21% | 69% | 10% | -48% | 1,004 | 28.1 |
| 2020-08-20 | 2020-08-26 | HKIAPS | – | – | – | – | – | 708 | 25.4 |
| 2020-08-17 | 2020-08-20 | HKPORI | 1,020 | 24% | 70% | 6% | -46% | 1,017 | 26.8 |
| 2020-08-03 | 2020-08-06 | HKPORI | 1,001 | 19% | 72% | 9% | -54% | 996 | 26.9 |
| 2020-07-20 | 2020-07-24 | HKPORI | 1,029 | 18% | 72% | 10% | -54% | 1,022 | 28.9 |
| 2020-07-06 | 2020-07-09 | HKPORI | 1,001 | 23% | 69% | 8% | -46% | 999 | 29.0 |
1 July 2020 – Hong Kong National Security Law imposed by Chinese Government
| 2020-06-22 | 2020-06-29 | HKIAPS | – | – | – | – | – | 698 | 24.2 |
| 2020-06-15 | 2020-06-18 | HKPORI | 1,002 | 22% | 70% | 8% | -49% | 999 | 29.0 |
| 2020-06-01 | 2020-06-04 | HKPORI | 1,002 | 18% | 72% | 9% | -54% | 1,000 | 27.8 |
| 2020-05-20 | 2020-05-28 | HKIAPS | – | – | – | – | – | 720 | 22.2 |
| 2020-05-19 | 2020-05-21 | HKPORI | 1,001 | 19% | 73% | 9% | -54% | 995 | 28.3 |
| 2020-05-04 | 2020-05-06 | HKPORI | 1,004 | 17% | 73% | 10% | -56% | 1,003 | 27.9 |
| 2020-04-17 | 2020-04-23 | HKIAPS | – | – | – | – | – | 714 | 26.8 |
| 2020-04-14 | 2020-04-17 | HKPORI | 1,005 | 18% | 72% | 10% | -54% | 1,000 | 27.7 |
| 2020-03-30 | 2020-04-02 | HKPORI | 1,005 | 16% | 75% | 9% | -60% | 1,001 | 25.5 |
| 2020-03-19 | 2020-03-23 | HKIAPS | – | – | – | – | – | 515 | 25.0 |
| 2020-03-17 | 2020-03-20 | HKPORI | 1,004 | 13% | 77% | 10% | -64% | 993 | 22.3 |
| 2020-02-27 | 2020-03-03 | HKPORI | 1,015 | 13% | 80% | 7% | -66% | 1,008 | 22.6 |
| 2020-02-17 | 2020-02-19 | HKPORI | 1,008 | 9% | 83% | 8% | -74% | 999 | 18.2 |
| 2020-02-03 | 2020-02-06 | HKPORI | 1,001 | 13% | 81% | 6% | -68% | 997 | 20.3 |
23 January 2020 – First COVID case identified in Hong Kong
| 2020-01-16 | 2020-01-21 | HKPORI | 1,004 | 14% | 80% | 7% | -66% | 994 | 20.8 |
| 2020-01-16 | 2020-01-22 | HKIAPS | – | – | – | – | – | 699 | 23.4 |
| 2020-01-03 | 2020-01-08 | HKPORI | 1,011 | 14% | 80% | 6% | -66% | 1,008 | 21.5 |
2020
| 2019-12-16 | 2019-12-20 | HKIAPS | – | – | – | – | – | 703 | 22.2 |
| 2019-12-13 | 2019-12-18 | HKPORI | 1,046 | 12% | 81% | 7% | -68% | 1,028 | 19.6 |
| 2019-11-28 | 2019-12-03 | HKPORI | 1,014 | 10% | 82% | 7% | -73% | 1,001 | 19.7 |
| 2019-11-27 | 2019-12-03 | HKIAPS | – | – | – | – | – | 507 | 22.4 |
| 2019-11-15 | 2019-11-21 | HKPORI | 1,008 | 11% | 82% | 7% | -72% | 1,001 | 19.7 |
| 2019-11-01 | 2019-11-08 | HKPORI | 1,016 | 11% | 83% | 6% | -71% | 1,003 | 19.5 |
| 2019-10-22 | 2019-10-28 | HKIAPS | – | – | – | – | – | 709 | 25.5 |
| 2019-10-17 | 2019-10-23 | HKPORI | 1,038 | 11% | 82% | 7% | -71% | 1,036 | 20.2 |
| 2019-10-16 | 2019-10-16 | HKPORI | 745 | 15% | 79% | 6% | -64% | 736 | 22.7 |
| 2019-09-30 | 2019-10-03 | HKPORI | 1,004 | 15% | 80% | 6% | -65% | 998 | 22.3 |
| 2019-09-20 | 2019-09-26 | HKIAPS | – | – | – | – | – | 700 | 28.2 |
| 2019-09-16 | 2019-09-19 | HKPORI | 1,061 | 18% | 74% | 8% | -57% | 1,049 | 24.9 |
| 2019-09-02 | 2019-09-04 | HKPORI | 1,046 | 19% | 75% | 6% | -55% | 1,040 | 25.4 |
| 2019-08-21 | 2019-08-27 | HKIAPS | – | – | – | – | – | 712 | 28.4 |
| 2019-08-15 | 2019-08-20 | HKPORI | 1,023 | 17% | 76% | 7% | -59% | 1,008 | 24.6 |
| 2019-08-01 | 2019-08-06 | HKPORI | 1,015 | 20% | 72% | 8% | -51% | 1,006 | 27.9 |
| 2019-07-19 | 2019-07-30 | HKIAPS | – | – | – | – | – | 744 | 32.9 |
| 2019-07-17 | 2019-07-19 | HKPORI | 1,002 | 21% | 70% | 8% | -49% | 997 | 30.1 |
| 2019-07-02 | 2019-07-08 | HKPORI | 1,025 | 26% | 66% | 9% | -40% | 1,016 | 33.4 |
| 2019-06-17 | 2019-06-20 | HKUPOP | 1,015 | 23% | 67% | 10% | -44% | 1,001 | 32.8 |
| 2019-06-17 | 2019-06-20 | HKIAPS | – | – | – | – | – | 721 | 37.5 |
9 June 2019 – Breakout of large-scale protests
| 2019-06-03 | 2019-06-06 | HKUPOP | 1,006 | 32% | 57% | 11% | -24% | 993 | 43.3 |
| 2019-05-20 | 2019-05-23 | HKUPOP | 1,013 | 32% | 59% | 9% | -27% | 998 | 44.7 |
| 2019-05-20 | 2019-05-25 | HKIAPS | – | – | – | – | – | 694 | 48.1 |
| 2019-05-06 | 2019-05-09 | HKUPOP | 1,018 | 32% | 56% | 12% | -24% | 1,004 | 44.3 |
| 2019-04-23 | 2019-04-25 | HKUPOP | 1,031 | 36% | 49% | 15% | -13% | 1,015 | 49.0 |
| 2019-04-18 | 2019-04-26 | HKIAPS | – | – | – | – | – | 704 | 51.0 |
| 2019-04-08 | 2019-04-11 | HKUPOP | 1,012 | 34% | 51% | 16% | -17% | 996 | 48.5 |
| 2019-03-16 | 2019-03-21 | HKIAPS | – | – | – | – | – | 682 | 53 |
| 2019-03-14 | 2019-03-19 | HKUPOP | 1,024 | 39% | 45% | 16% | -7% | 1,011 | 52.6 |
| 2019-02-28 | 2019-03-05 | HKUPOP | 1,024 | 35% | 51% | 14% | -16% | 1,010 | 50.9 |
| 2019-02-18 | 2019-02-21 | HKUPOP | 1,001 | 38% | 46% | 16% | -7% | 981 | 50.0 |
| 2019-02-15 | 2019-02-21 | HKIAPS | – | – | – | – | – | 703 | 51.7 |
| 2019-01-29 | 2019-02-08 | HKUPOP | 1,000 | 35% | 49% | 16% | -14% | 983 | 47.4 |
| 2019-01-21 | 2019-01-24 | HKUPOP | 1,000 | 32% | 52% | 16% | -20% | 985 | 45.5 |
| 2019-01-16 | 2019-01-22 | HKIAPS | – | – | – | – | – | 707 | 50.9 |
| 2019-01-07 | 2019-01-11 | HKUPOP | 1,007 | 37% | 48% | 15% | -11% | 996 | 50.9 |
2019
| 2018-12-17 | 2018-12-20 | HKUPOP | 1,000 | 49% | 39% | 12% | 10% | 990 | 56.4 |
| 2018-12-11 | 2018-12-17 | HKIAPS | – | – | – | – | – | 701 | 52.7 |
| 2018-12-03 | 2018-12-06 | HKUPOP | 1,005 | 39% | 47% | 14% | -7% | 992 | 50.1 |
| 2018-11-19 | 2018-11-22 | HKIAPS | – | – | – | – | – | 705 | 53.1 |
| 2018-11-15 | 2018-11-19 | HKUPOP | 1,000 | 40% | 44% | 16% | -4% | 985 | 50.2 |
| 2018-11-01 | 2018-11-06 | HKUPOP | 1,002 | 40% | 45% | 15% | -6% | 993 | 52.3 |
| 2018-10-22 | 2018-10-24 | HKUPOP | 1,006 | 41% | 43% | 17% | -1% | 990 | 51.6 |
| 2018-10-15 | 2018-10-22 | HKIAPS | – | – | – | – | – | 701 | 52.3 |
| 2018-10-10 | 2018-10-10 | HKUPOP | 584 | 38% | 48% | 15% | -10% | 574 | 47.6 |
| 2018-10-02 | 2018-10-04 | HKUPOP | 1,002 | 44% | 40% | 17% | 4% | 992 | 52.3 |
| 2018-09-19 | 2018-09-26 | HKIAPS | – | – | – | – | – | 713 | 53.9 |
| 2018-09-18 | 2018-09-20 | HKUPOP | 1,002 | 40% | 45% | 15% | -4% | 991 | 50.8 |
| 2018-09-03 | 2018-09-06 | HKUPOP | 1,030 | 48% | 38% | 14% | 10% | 1,016 | 57.3 |
| 2018-08-22 | 2018-08-30 | HKIAPS | – | – | – | – | – | 703 | 56.2 |
| 2018-08-20 | 2018-08-22 | HKUPOP | 1,022 | 49% | 35% | 16% | 14% | 1,003 | 55.3 |
| 2018-08-06 | 2018-08-09 | HKUPOP | 1,000 | 45% | 44% | 11% | 1% | 991 | 55.4 |
| 2018-07-26 | 2018-07-31 | HKIAPS | – | – | – | – | – | 686 | 56.7 |
| 2018-07-18 | 2018-07-23 | HKUPOP | 1,002 | 47% | 38% | 15% | 9% | 984 | 56.2 |
| 2018-07-03 | 2018-07-05 | HKUPOP | 1,001 | 49% | 38% | 13% | 12% | 991 | 55.6 |
| 2018-06-19 | 2018-06-26 | HKIAPS | – | – | – | – | – | 709 | 55.5 |
| 2018-06-14 | 2018-06-21 | HKUPOP | 1,000 | 44% | 42% | 15% | 2% | 988 | 54.3 |
| 2018-06-04 | 2018-06-07 | HKUPOP | 1,001 | 48% | 40% | 12% | 7% | 979 | 54.3 |
| 2018-05-21 | 2018-05-25 | HKUPOP | 1,009 | 39% | 44% | 17% | -5% | 986 | 52.7 |
| 2018-05-17 | 2018-05-24 | HKIAPS | – | – | – | – | – | 691 | 57.0 |
| 2018-05-04 | 2018-05-09 | HKUPOP | 1,017 | 49% | 36% | 16% | 14% | 1,009 | 57.8 |
| 2018-04-20 | 2018-04-25 | HKIAPS | – | – | – | – | – | 695 | 55.9 |
| 2018-04-16 | 2018-04-19 | HKUPOP | 1,001 | 45% | 41% | 14% | 4% | 991 | 53.9 |
| 2018-04-02 | 2018-04-04 | HKUPOP | 1,003 | 42% | 44% | 14% | -2% | 993 | 55.6 |
| 2018-03-21 | 2018-03-26 | HKIAPS | – | – | – | – | – | 732 | 56.2 |
| 2018-03-15 | 2018-03-20 | HKUPOP | 1,006 | 44% | 41% | 15% | 3% | 988 | 56.8 |
| 2018-03-01 | 2018-03-06 | HKUPOP | 1,002 | 47% | 41% | 12% | 6% | 992 | 56.3 |
| 2018-02-23 | 2018-02-27 | HKIAPS | – | – | – | – | – | 804 | 55.6 |
| 2018-02-20 | 2018-02-22 | HKUPOP | 1,017 | 47% | 40% | 13% | 7% | 1,007 | 55.7 |
| 2018-02-01 | 2018-02-06 | HKUPOP | 1,001 | 47% | 43% | 11% | 4% | 997 | 53.6 |
| 2018-01-19 | 2018-01-24 | HKIAPS | – | – | – | – | – | 721 | 54.7 |
| 2018-01-15 | 2018-01-18 | HKUPOP | 1,035 | 45% | 41% | 14% | 4% | 1,013 | 54.4 |
| 2018-01-03 | 2018-01-04 | HKUPOP | 1,000 | 51% | 36% | 13% | 15% | 989 | 58.7 |
2018
| 2017-12-18 | 2017-12-19 | HKUPOP | 1,013 | 49% | 36% | 15% | 12% | 994 | 58.3 |
| 2017-12-15 | 2017-12-21 | HKIAPS | – | – | – | – | – | 696 | 56.0 |
| 2017-12-04 | 2017-12-06 | HKUPOP | 1,034 | 49% | 37% | 15% | 12% | 1,016 | 55.7 |
| 2017-11-21 | 2017-11-25 | HKIAPS | – | – | – | – | – | 716 | 57.8 |
| 2017-11-14 | 2017-11-16 | HKUPOP | 1,011 | 54% | 31% | 15% | 23% | 1,001 | 62.9 |
| 2017-11-06 | 2017-11-09 | HKUPOP | 1,002 | 50% | 36% | 14% | 15% | 986 | 58.9 |
| 2017-10-19 | 2017-10-25 | HKIAPS | – | – | – | – | – | 721 | 57.2 |
| 2017-10-16 | 2017-10-19 | HKUPOP | 1,009 | 53% | 33% | 14% | 20% | 987 | 62.0 |
| 2017-10-11 | 2017-10-11 | HKUPOP | 673 | 53% | 29% | 18% | 23% | 658 | 61.1 |
| 2017-10-03 | 2017-10-04 | HKUPOP | 1,005 | 50% | 40% | 11% | 10% | 982 | 59.6 |
| 2017-09-18 | 2017-09-22 | HKIAPS | – | – | – | – | – | 700 | 56.0 |
| 2017-09-12 | 2017-09-15 | HKUPOP | 1,017 | 47% | 41% | 12% | 7% | 992 | 57.4 |
| 2017-09-01 | 2017-09-06 | HKUPOP | 1,010 | 52% | 34% | 13% | 18% | 985 | 59.8 |
| 2017-08-18 | 2017-08-25 | HKIAPS | – | – | – | – | – | 708 | 54.2 |
| 2017-08-16 | 2017-08-21 | HKUPOP | 1,028 | 51% | 38% | 11% | 14% | 998 | 59.8 |
| 2017-08-02 | 2017-08-07 | HKUPOP | 1,016 | 51% | 37% | 12% | 14% | 991 | 59.5 |
| 2017-07-17 | 2017-07-20 | HKUPOP | 1,020 | 50% | 35% | 15% | 15% | 960 | 58.5 |
| 2017-07-13 | 2017-07-18 | HKIAPS | – | – | – | – | – | 684 | 55.3 |
| 2017-07-03 | 2017-07-06 | HKUPOP | 1,036 | 52% | 34% | 14% | 18% | 994 | 63.6 |
1 July 2017 – Carrie Lam and her cabinet took office
| 2017-06-23 | 2017-06-27 | HKIAPS | – | – | – | – | – | 689 | 53.9 |
| 2017-06-19 | 2017-06-22 | HKUPOP | 1,007 | 45% | 41% | 14% | 4% | ? | 52.2 |
| 2017-06-05 | 2017-06-08 | HKUPOP | 1,036 | 49% | 44% | 7% | 6% | ? | 54.7 |
| 2017-05-22 | 2017-05-25 | HKUPOP | 1,003 | 46% | 45% | 9% | 0% | ? | 54.0 |
| 2017-05-19 | 2017-05-24 | HKIAPS | – | – | – | – | – | 677 | 54.8 |
| 2017-05-08 | 2017-05-11 | HKUPOP | 1,004 | 47% | 44% | 9% | 3% | ? | 56.7 |
| 2017-04-24 | 2017-04-27 | HKUPOP | 1,006 | 42% | 49% | 9% | -7% | ? | 52.6 |
| 2017-04-20 | 2017-04-25 | HKIAPS | – | – | – | – | – | 721 | 54.5 |
| 2017-04-03 | 2017-04-06 | HKUPOP | 1,009 | 48% | 46% | 6% | 2% | ? | 55.6 |
| 2017-03-27 | 2017-03-30 | HKUPOP | 1,002 | 43% | 50% | 7% | -8% | 985 | 55.6 |
| 2017-03-27 | 2017-03-30 | HKIAPS | 736 | 42% | 29% | 29% | 13% | 721 | 54.0 |

== Polling on Government ==
=== Survey questions ===
- HKPORI and its predecessor HKUPOP: "Are you satisfied with the performance of the HKSAR Government?"
- HKIAPS: "In general, are you satisfied with the performance of the HKSAR Government? Is it 'dissatisfied', 'in-between or average', or 'satisfied'?"

=== Notes ===
- Option of the "Half" below refers to "Half-half" for HKPORI and HKUPOP; "In-between" for HKIAPS.
- Option of the "Others" below refers to "Don't know" and "Hard to say" for HKPORI, HKUPOP and HKIAPS.

=== Graphical summary ===
View source data.

=== Statistical table ===
| Date(s) conducted between | | Conducted by | Sample size | Satisfied | Half | Dissatisfied | Others | Net |
|---|---|---|---|---|---|---|---|---|
| 2022-06-20 | 2022-06-24 | HKPORI | 1,001 | 23% | 25% | 49% | 4% | -27% |
| 2022-05-27 | 2022-06-14 | HKIAPS | 710 | 18% | 37% | 44% | 1% | -26% |
| 2022-05-12 | 2022-05-20 | HKPORI | 1,003 | 19% | 19% | 59% | 3% | -40% |
| 2022-04-21 | 2022-04-29 | HKIAPS | 706 | 14% | 39% | 47% | 1% | -33% |
| 2022-04-19 | 2022-04-22 | HKPORI | 1,001 | 19% | 18% | 61% | 2% | -42% |
4 April 2022 – Carrie Lam announced not to seek for second term
| 2022-03-21 | 2022-03-25 | HKPORI | 1,004 | 10% | 15% | 72% | 3% | -62% |
| 2022-02-21 | 2022-02-24 | HKPORI | 1,002 | 16% | 18% | 64% | 2% | -48% |
| 2022-01-17 | 2022-01-20 | HKPORI | 1,001 | 20% | 17% | 60% | 3% | -39% |
| 2022-01-10 | 2022-01-19 | HKIAPS | 706 | 17% | 32% | 49% | 2% | -31% |
January 2022 – Outbreak of the deadliest fifth wave of COVID pandemic
2022
| 2021-12-09 | 2021-12-14 | HKPORI | 1,017 | 25% | 18% | 56% | 1% | -31% |
| 2021-11-29 | 2021-12-08 | HKIAPS | 712 | 19% | 32% | 47% | 2% | -28% |
| 2021-11-15 | 2021-11-18 | HKPORI | 1,004 | 26% | 17% | 56% | 1% | -30% |
| 2021-10-18 | 2021-10-22 | HKPORI | 1,000 | 26% | 18% | 55% | 1% | -29% |
| 2021-09-16 | 2021-09-23 | HKPORI | 1,036 | 25% | 20% | 54% | 2% | -30% |
| 2021-09-16 | 2021-09-25 | HKIAPS | 716 | 17% | 30% | 52% | 1% | -34% |
| 2021-08-20 | 2021-08-26 | HKPORI | 1,003 | 21% | 19% | 59% | 1% | -38% |
| 2021-07-19 | 2021-07-22 | HKPORI | 1,000 | 24% | 18% | 58% | 1% | -34% |
| 2021-07-15 | 2021-07-26 | HKIAPS | 706 | 18% | 30% | 52% | 1% | -34% |
| 2021-06-21 | 2021-06-25 | HKPORI | 1,014 | 24% | 15% | 60% | 1% | -36% |
| 2021-06-11 | 2021-06-21 | HKIAPS | 703 | 14% | 30% | 55% | 1% | -41% |
| 2021-05-20 | 2021-05-27 | HKIAPS | 705 | 14% | 29% | 55% | 1% | -41% |
| 2021-05-17 | 2021-05-21 | HKPORI | 1,004 | 17% | 19% | 63% | 1% | -46% |
| 2021-04-19 | 2021-04-22 | HKPORI | 1,004 | 19% | 21% | 60% | 1% | -41% |
| 2021-04-16 | 2021-04-26 | HKIAPS | 706 | 14% | 27% | 58% | 1% | -44% |
| 2021-03-22 | 2021-03-25 | HKPORI | 1,010 | 21% | 16% | 62% | 1% | -42% |
| 2021-03-17 | 2021-03-24 | HKIAPS | 712 | 15% | 24% | 60% | 1% | -45% |
| 2021-02-24 | 2021-02-26 | HKPORI | 1,000 | 23% | 20% | 56% | 1% | -33% |
| 2021-02-19 | 2021-02-26 | HKIAPS | 704 | 16% | 24% | 60% | 1% | -44% |
| 2021-01-18 | 2021-01-22 | HKPORI | 1,011 | 16% | 21% | 62% | 1% | -45% |
| 2021-01-15 | 2021-01-22 | HKIAPS | 720 | 14% | 24% | 62% | 0% | -47% |
2021
| 2020-12-18 | 2020-12-22 | HKPORI | 1,014 | 17% | 22% | 60% | 2% | -43% |
| 2020-12-08 | 2020-12-15 | HKIAPS | 709 | 16% | 21% | 63% | 1% | -47% |
| 2020-11-23 | 2020-11-26 | HKPORI | 1,085 | 19% | 17% | 62% | 2% | -43% |
| 2020-11-16 | 2020-11-23 | HKIAPS | 703 | 16% | 21% | 62% | 1% | -46% |
| 2020-10-19 | 2020-10-22 | HKPORI | 1,020 | 17% | 14% | 69% | 1% | -52% |
| 2020-10-19 | 2020-10-23 | HKIAPS | 715 | 14% | 22% | 63% | 0% | -49% |
| 2020-09-21 | 2020-09-24 | HKPORI | 1,013 | 17% | 18% | 63% | 2% | -46% |
| 2020-09-18 | 2020-09-24 | HKIAPS | 737 | 14% | 21% | 64% | 1% | -51% |
| 2020-08-20 | 2020-08-26 | HKIAPS | 717 | 16% | 21% | 63% | 0% | -47% |
| 2020-08-17 | 2020-08-20 | HKPORI | 1,020 | 20% | 15% | 65% | 0% | -45% |
| 2020-07-20 | 2020-07-24 | HKPORI | 1,029 | 19% | 15% | 65% | 2% | -46% |
1 July 2020 – Hong Kong National Security Law imposed by Chinese Government
| 2020-06-22 | 2020-06-29 | HKIAPS | 707 | 14% | 19% | 66% | 1% | -52% |
| 2020-06-15 | 2020-06-18 | HKPORI | 1,002 | 17% | 11% | 71% | 2% | -54% |
| 2020-05-20 | 2020-05-28 | HKIAPS | 732 | 13% | 19% | 68% | 0% | -55% |
| 2020-05-19 | 2020-05-21 | HKPORI | 1,001 | 19% | 13% | 67% | 1% | -49% |
| 2020-04-17 | 2020-04-23 | HKIAPS | 722 | 18% | 22% | 60% | 0% | -43% |
| 2020-04-14 | 2020-04-17 | HKPORI | 1,005 | 21% | 10% | 68% | 1% | -47% |
| 2020-03-19 | 2020-03-23 | HKIAPS | 518 | 16% | 20% | 64% | 0% | -48% |
| 2020-03-17 | 2020-03-20 | HKPORI | 1,004 | 17% | 13% | 68% | 1% | -51% |
| 2020-02-17 | 2020-02-19 | HKPORI | 1,008 | 9% | 7% | 83% | 1% | -74% |
23 January 2020 – First COVID case identified in Hong Kong
| 2020-01-16 | 2020-01-21 | HKPORI | 1,004 | 15% | 8% | 75% | 2% | -60% |
| 2020-01-16 | 2020-01-22 | HKIAPS | 704 | 11% | 21% | 67% | 0% | -56% |
2020
| 2019-12-16 | 2019-12-20 | HKIAPS | 708 | 11% | 19% | 70% | 0% | -59% |
| 2019-12-13 | 2019-12-18 | HKPORI | 1,046 | 14% | 8% | 76% | 2% | -62% |
| 2019-11-27 | 2019-12-03 | HKIAPS | 510 | 10% | 19% | 70% | 0% | -60% |
| 2019-11-15 | 2019-11-21 | HKPORI | 1,008 | 11% | 11% | 77% | 1% | -66% |
| 2019-10-22 | 2019-10-28 | HKIAPS | 714 | 10% | 23% | 66% | 1% | -56% |
| 2019-10-17 | 2019-10-23 | HKPORI | 1,038 | 10% | 10% | 79% | 1% | -69% |
| 2019-09-20 | 2019-09-26 | HKIAPS | 707 | 12% | 24% | 63% | 1% | -52% |
| 2019-09-16 | 2019-09-19 | HKPORI | 1,061 | 12% | 11% | 76% | 1% | -63% |
| 2019-08-21 | 2019-08-27 | HKIAPS | 716 | 11% | 23% | 66% | 1% | -54% |
| 2019-08-15 | 2019-08-20 | HKPORI | 1,023 | 14% | 8% | 77% | 1% | -63% |
| 2019-07-19 | 2019-07-30 | HKIAPS | 752 | 15% | 21% | 63% | 1% | -48% |
| 2019-07-17 | 2019-07-19 | HKPORI | 1,002 | 19% | 10% | 70% | 1% | -52% |
| 2019-06-17 | 2019-06-20 | HKUPOP | 1,015 | 18% | 9% | 72% | 1% | -53% |
| 2019-06-17 | 2019-06-20 | HKIAPS | 732 | 18% | 20% | 60% | 1% | -42% |
9 June 2019 – Breakout of large-scale protests
| 2019-05-20 | 2019-05-23 | HKUPOP | 1,013 | 27% | 17% | 55% | 1% | -28% |
| 2019-05-20 | 2019-05-25 | HKIAPS | 704 | 23% | 34% | 41% | 3% | -18% |
| 2019-04-23 | 2019-04-25 | HKUPOP | 1,031 | 30% | 20% | 48% | 2% | -19% |
| 2019-04-18 | 2019-04-26 | HKIAPS | 707 | 27% | 36% | 37% | 1% | -11% |
| 2019-03-16 | 2019-03-21 | HKIAPS | 703 | 29% | 35% | 34% | 2% | -5% |
| 2019-03-14 | 2019-03-19 | HKUPOP | 1,024 | 31% | 20% | 49% | 1% | -18% |
| 2019-02-18 | 2019-02-21 | HKUPOP | 1,001 | 29% | 24% | 46% | 1% | -17% |
| 2019-02-15 | 2019-02-21 | HKIAPS | 709 | 28% | 36% | 36% | 0% | -8% |
| 2019-01-21 | 2019-01-24 | HKUPOP | 1,000 | 27% | 23% | 49% | 1% | -23% |
| 2019-01-16 | 2019-01-22 | HKIAPS | 711 | 27% | 35% | 38% | 1% | -11% |
2019
| 2018-12-17 | 2018-12-20 | HKUPOP | 1,000 | 42% | 21% | 36% | 1% | 5% |
| 2018-12-11 | 2018-12-17 | HKIAPS | 708 | 29% | 36% | 34% | 1% | -5% |
| 2018-11-19 | 2018-11-22 | HKIAPS | 713 | 29% | 38% | 33% | 1% | -4% |
| 2018-11-15 | 2018-11-19 | HKUPOP | 1,000 | 35% | 19% | 46% | 1% | -11% |
| 2018-10-22 | 2018-10-24 | HKUPOP | 1,006 | 37% | 20% | 42% | 1% | -4% |
| 2018-10-15 | 2018-10-22 | HKIAPS | 706 | 30% | 36% | 33% | 1% | -4% |
| 2018-09-19 | 2018-09-26 | HKIAPS | 719 | 30% | 37% | 32% | 1% | -2% |
| 2018-09-18 | 2018-09-20 | HKUPOP | 1,002 | 37% | 17% | 45% | 1% | -8% |
| 2018-08-22 | 2018-08-30 | HKIAPS | 710 | 31% | 40% | 28% | 1% | 3% |
| 2018-08-20 | 2018-08-22 | HKUPOP | 1,022 | 37% | 22% | 40% | 1% | -3% |
| 2018-07-26 | 2018-07-31 | HKIAPS | 702 | 33% | 37% | 29% | 1% | 4% |
| 2018-07-18 | 2018-07-23 | HKUPOP | 1,002 | 32% | 23% | 43% | 2% | -11% |
| 2018-07-03 | 2018-07-05 | HKUPOP | 1,001 | 39% | 22% | 39% | 1% | 0% |
| 2018-06-19 | 2018-06-26 | HKIAPS | 712 | 33% | 36% | 30% | 1% | 3% |
| 2018-06-14 | 2018-06-21 | HKUPOP | 1,000 | 35% | 20% | 44% | 1% | -10% |
| 2018-06-04 | 2018-06-07 | HKUPOP | 1,001 | 34% | 22% | 42% | 2% | -8% |
| 2018-05-21 | 2018-05-25 | HKUPOP | 1,009 | 30% | 21% | 48% | 1% | -19% |
| 2018-05-17 | 2018-05-24 | HKIAPS | 714 | 33% | 36% | 29% | 1% | 4% |
| 2018-05-04 | 2018-05-09 | HKUPOP | 1,017 | 37% | 21% | 41% | 1% | -3% |
| 2018-04-20 | 2018-04-25 | HKIAPS | 703 | 31% | 36% | 30% | 3% | 1% |
| 2018-04-16 | 2018-04-19 | HKUPOP | 1,001 | 35% | 22% | 42% | 1% | -7% |
| 2018-04-02 | 2018-04-04 | HKUPOP | 1,003 | 31% | 19% | 49% | 1% | -18% |
| 2018-03-21 | 2018-03-26 | HKIAPS | 733 | 32% | 37% | 30% | 2% | 2% |
| 2018-03-15 | 2018-03-20 | HKUPOP | 1,006 | 38% | 22% | 40% | 0% | -2% |
| 2018-03-01 | 2018-03-06 | HKUPOP | 1,002 | 34% | 23% | 42% | 1% | -8% |
| 2018-02-23 | 2018-02-27 | HKIAPS | 809 | 32% | 39% | 28% | 1% | 4% |
| 2018-02-20 | 2018-02-22 | HKUPOP | 1,017 | 39% | 22% | 38% | 1% | 0% |
| 2018-02-01 | 2018-02-06 | HKUPOP | 1,001 | 41% | 20% | 39% | 1% | 2% |
| 2018-01-19 | 2018-01-24 | HKIAPS | 731 | 31% | 37% | 31% | 1% | 0% |
| 2018-01-15 | 2018-01-18 | HKUPOP | 1,035 | 36% | 19% | 42% | 2% | -6% |
| 2018-01-03 | 2018-01-04 | HKUPOP | 1,000 | 38% | 22% | 39% | 1% | -1% |
2018
| 2017-12-18 | 2017-12-19 | HKUPOP | 1,013 | 38% | 24% | 35% | 3% | 3% |
| 2017-12-15 | 2017-12-21 | HKIAPS | 706 | 34% | 35% | 30% | 1% | 5% |
| 2017-12-04 | 2017-12-06 | HKUPOP | 1,034 | 39% | 24% | 37% | 1% | 2% |
| 2017-11-21 | 2017-11-25 | HKIAPS | 722 | 36% | 37% | 27% | 0% | 8% |
| 2017-11-14 | 2017-11-16 | HKUPOP | 1,011 | 47% | 23% | 30% | 1% | 17% |
| 2017-11-06 | 2017-11-09 | HKUPOP | 1,002 | 40% | 25% | 35% | 1% | 5% |
| 2017-10-19 | 2017-10-25 | HKIAPS | 731 | 35% | 35% | 28% | 2% | 7% |
| 2017-10-16 | 2017-10-19 | HKUPOP | 1,009 | 45% | 24% | 29% | 1% | 16% |
| 2017-10-03 | 2017-10-04 | HKUPOP | 1,005 | 40% | 20% | 39% | 1% | 1% |
| 2017-09-18 | 2017-09-22 | HKIAPS | 719 | 32% | 36% | 30% | 2% | 2% |
| 2017-09-12 | 2017-09-15 | HKUPOP | 1,017 | 41% | 19% | 38% | 2% | 3% |
| 2017-09-01 | 2017-09-06 | HKUPOP | 1,010 | 41% | 25% | 30% | 3% | 11% |
| 2017-08-18 | 2017-08-25 | HKIAPS | 724 | 31% | 35% | 32% | 2% | -1% |
| 2017-08-16 | 2017-08-21 | HKUPOP | 1,028 | 40% | 21% | 37% | 2% | 3% |
| 2017-08-02 | 2017-08-07 | HKUPOP | 1,016 | 36% | 22% | 39% | 3% | -3% |
| 2017-07-17 | 2017-07-20 | HKUPOP | 1,020 | 35% | 19% | 41% | 6% | -6% |
| 2017-07-13 | 2017-07-18 | HKIAPS | 721 | 30% | 34% | 34% | 2% | -4% |
| 2017-07-03 | 2017-07-06 | HKUPOP | 1,036 | 34% | 21% | 39% | 6% | -4% |
1 July 2017 – Carrie Lam and her cabinet took office
