= Financial Secretary (Hong Kong) =

Government minister

- 財政司司長
- Emblem of Hong Kong

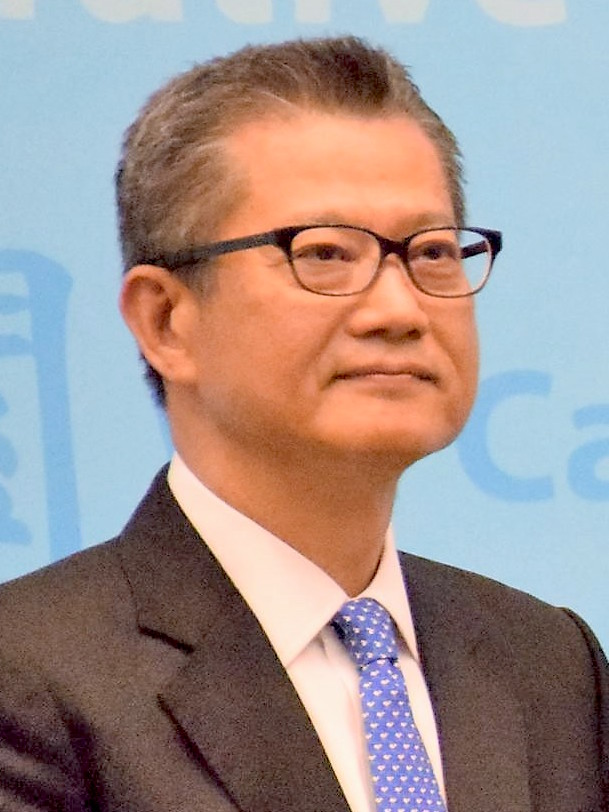
- Incumbent; The Hon Paul Chan since 16 January 2017
- Style: The Honourable
- Member of: Executive Council
- Reports to: Legislative Council
- Residence: 45 Shouson Hill Road
- Nominator: Chief Executive
- Appointer: State Council of the People's Republic of China
- Term length: No longer than the Chief Executive's remaining term
- Inaugural holder: Sir Donald Tsang
- Formation: 1 July 1997
- Salary: HK$4.3 million p.a.
- Website: fso.gov.hk

Financial Secretary
- Traditional Chinese: 財政司司長
- Simplified Chinese: 财政司司长
Transcriptions
Standard Mandarin
- Hanyu Pinyin: Cáizhèng Sī Sīzhǎng
Yue: Cantonese
- Yale Romanization: Chòih jing sī sī jéung
- Jyutping: Coi^{4} zing^{3} si^{1} si^{1} zoeng^{2}

The Financial Secretary is the title held by the Hong Kong government minister who is responsible for all economic and financial matters (“Department of Finance” per Article 60 of the Basic Law). The position is among the three most senior Principal Officials of the Government, second only to the Chief Secretary in the order of precedence (but not subordinate to the CS). Together with other secretaries, the Financial Secretary is accountable to the Legislative Council and the Chief Executive (the Governor before the 1997 handover) for his actions in supervising the formulation and implementation of financial and economic policies.

The position evolved out of the office of the Colonial Treasurer before 1940. The Financial Secretary is a member of the Executive Council, and gives advice to the Chief Executive in that capacity. He is also responsible for delivering the annual budget to the Legislative Council. To date, it is the only office among the three highest Principal Officials of the Government (Chief Secretary, Financial Secretary, and Secretary for Justice) not to have been occupied by a woman.

The incumbent Financial Secretary is Paul Chan Mo-po.

== Role ==
The financial secretary delivers the budget and oversees the Commerce and Economic Development Bureau, the Development Bureau, the Financial Services and the Treasury Bureau, the Housing Bureau, the Innovation, Technology and Industry Bureau, and the Transport and Logistics Bureau. The financial secretary's office also exercises control over the Hong Kong Monetary Authority, which is Hong Kong's de facto central bank. The Office of the Government Economist and Budget and Tax Policy Unit are also attached to the Financial Secretary's Office.

The office is incorporated as a corporation sole, known as The Financial Secretary Incorporated.

== List of secretaries ==
=== Secretaries and treasurers to the Superintendent, 1842–1844 ===
- Edward Elmslie, 1842–1843
- Charles Edward Stewart, 1843–1844

=== Colonial treasurers, 1844–1937 ===
No.	Portrait	Name	Term of office		Governor	Ref
1		Montgomery Martin	31 May 1844	8 July 1845	Sir John Francis Davis (1843–1844)	
2		William Thomas Mercer 孖沙	1 January 1848	31 March 1854	Sir John Francis Davis (1843–1844)	
2		William Thomas Mercer 孖沙	1 January 1848	31 March 1854	Sir George Bonham (1844–1854)	
3		Robert Rienaecker	1854	1856	Sir John Bowring (1844–1859)	
4		Frederick Forth	15 May 1857	23 February 1871	Sir John Bowring (1844–1859)	
4		Frederick Forth	15 May 1857	23 February 1871	Sir Hercules Robinson (1859–1865)	
4		Frederick Forth	15 May 1857	23 February 1871	Sir Richard MacDonnell (1865–1872)	
5		Sir Cecil Clementi Smith	13 November 1874	29 April 1878	Sir Richard MacDonnell (1865–1872)	
5		Sir Cecil Clementi Smith	13 November 1874	29 April 1878	Sir Arthur Kennedy (1872–1877)	
6		Sir James Russell 羅素	26 February 1880	24 March 1883	Sir Arthur Kennedy (1872–1877)	
6		Sir James Russell 羅素	26 February 1880	24 March 1883	Sir John Pope Hennessy (1877–1882)	
7		Alfred Lister 理斯特	26 May 1883	16 June 1890	Sir George Bowen (1883–1885)	
7		Alfred Lister 理斯特	26 May 1883	16 June 1890	Sir William Des Voeux (1887–1891)	
8		N. G. Mitchell-Innes 密徹爾-因斯	15 October 1891	26 February 1895	Sir William Robinson (1891–1898)	
9		Thomas Sercombe Smith 史密夫	3 May 1897	28 February 1898	Sir William Robinson (1891–1898)	
10		A. MacDonald Thomson 譚臣	8 February 1899	10 December 1918	Sir Henry Arthur Blake (1898–1903)	
10		A. MacDonald Thomson 譚臣	8 February 1899	10 December 1918	Sir Matthew Nathan (1903–1907)	
10		A. MacDonald Thomson 譚臣	8 February 1899	10 December 1918	Sir Frederick Lugard (1907–1912)	
10		A. MacDonald Thomson 譚臣	8 February 1899	10 December 1918	Sir Francis Henry May (1912–1918)	
11		Charles Messer 馬斯德	31 December 1918	2 April 1931	Sir Reginald Stubbs (1919–1925)	
11		Charles Messer 馬斯德	31 December 1918	2 April 1931	Sir Cecil Clementi (1925–1930)	
11		Charles Messer 馬斯德	31 December 1918	2 April 1931	Sir William Peel (1930–1935)	
12		Edwin Taylor 戴萊	2 July 1931	10 March 1937	Sir William Peel (1930–1935)	
12		Edwin Taylor 戴萊	2 July 1931	10 March 1937	Sir Andrew Caldecott (1935–1937)	

=== Financial secretaries, 1937–1941 ===
No.	Portrait	Name	Term of office		Duration	Governor	Ref
1		Sir Sydney Caine 金錫儀	9 March 1938	16 November 1939	1 year, 252 days	Sir Geoffry Northcote (1937–1941)	
2		Henry Butters 畢打士	20 June 1940	25 December 1941	1 year, 188 days	Sir Geoffry Northcote (1937–1941)	
2		Henry Butters 畢打士	20 June 1940	25 December 1941	1 year, 188 days	Mark Aitchison Young (1941)	

=== Financial secretaries, 1946–1997 ===
№	Portrait	Name	Term of office		Duration	Governor	Ref
3		Sir Geoffrey Follows 霍勞士	1 May 1946	2 May 1951	5 years, 1 day	Sir Mark Aitchison Young (1946–1947)	
3		Sir Geoffrey Follows 霍勞士	1 May 1946	2 May 1951	5 years, 1 day	Sir Alexander Grantham (1947–1957)	
4		Arthur Grenfell Clarke 岐樂嘉	20 February 1952	9 April 1961	9 years, 49 days	Sir Alexander Grantham (1947–1957)	
4		Arthur Grenfell Clarke 岐樂嘉	20 February 1952	9 April 1961	9 years, 49 days	Sir Robert Brown Black (1958–1964)	
5		Sir John Cowperthwaite 郭伯偉	17 April 1961	30 June 1971	10 years, 75 days	Sir Robert Brown Black (1958–1964)	
5		Sir John Cowperthwaite 郭伯偉	17 April 1961	30 June 1971	10 years, 75 days	Sir David Trench (1964–1971)	
6		Sir Philip Haddon-Cave 夏鼎基	1 July 1971	31 May 1981	9 years, 335 days	Sir David Trench (1964–1971)	
6		Sir Philip Haddon-Cave 夏鼎基	1 July 1971	31 May 1981	9 years, 335 days	Sir Murray MacLehose (1971–1982)	
7		Sir John Henry Bremridge 彭勵治	1 June 1981	31 May 1986	5 years, 0 days	Sir Murray MacLehose (1971–1982)	
7		Sir John Henry Bremridge 彭勵治	1 June 1981	31 May 1986	5 years, 0 days	Sir Edward Youde (1982–1986)	
8		Sir Piers Jacobs 翟克誠	1 June 1986	11 August 1991	5 years, 72 days	Sir Edward Youde (1982–1986)	
8		Sir Piers Jacobs 翟克誠	1 June 1986	11 August 1991	5 years, 72 days	Sir David Wilson (1987–1992)	
9		Sir Hamish Macleod 麥高樂	12 August 1991	31 August 1995	4 years, 20 days	Sir David Wilson (1987–1992)	
9		Sir Hamish Macleod 麥高樂	12 August 1991	31 August 1995	4 years, 20 days	Chris Patten (1992–1997)	
10		Sir Donald Tsang 曾蔭權	1 September 1995	30 June 1997	1 year, 303 days	Chris Patten (1992–1997)	

=== Financial secretaries, 1997–present ===
Political party: Nonpartisan

No.	Portrait	Name	Term of office		Duration	Chief Executive	Term	Ref
1		Sir Donald Tsang 曾蔭權	1 July 1997	30 April 2001	3 years, 304 days	Tung Chee-hwa (1997–2005)	1	
2		Antony Leung Kam-chung 梁錦松	1 May 2001	16 July 2003	2 years, 77 days	Tung Chee-hwa (1997–2005)	1	
2		Antony Leung Kam-chung 梁錦松	1 May 2001	16 July 2003	2 years, 77 days	Tung Chee-hwa (1997–2005)	2	
3		Henry Tang Ying-yen 唐英年	4 August 2003	30 June 2007	3 years, 349 days	Tung Chee-hwa (1997–2005)	2	
3		Henry Tang Ying-yen 唐英年	4 August 2003	30 June 2007	3 years, 349 days	Donald Tsang (2005–2012)	2	
4		John Tsang Chun-wah 曾俊華	1 July 2007	16 January 2017 (Note: Resigned on 12 December 2016, with effect on 16 January 2017, KC Chan served as acting Financial Secretary from 13 December 2016 to 16 January 2017.)	9 years, 200 days	Donald Tsang (2005–2012)	3	
4		John Tsang Chun-wah 曾俊華	1 July 2007	16 January 2017	9 years, 200 days	Leung Chun-ying (2012–2017)	4	
5		Paul Chan Mo-po 陳茂波	16 January 2017	Incumbent	9 years, 275 days	Leung Chun-ying (2012–2017)	4	
5		Paul Chan Mo-po 陳茂波	16 January 2017	Incumbent	9 years, 275 days	Carrie Lam (2017–2022)	5	
5		Paul Chan Mo-po 陳茂波	16 January 2017	Incumbent	9 years, 275 days	John Lee (2022–present)	6	

== Residence ==
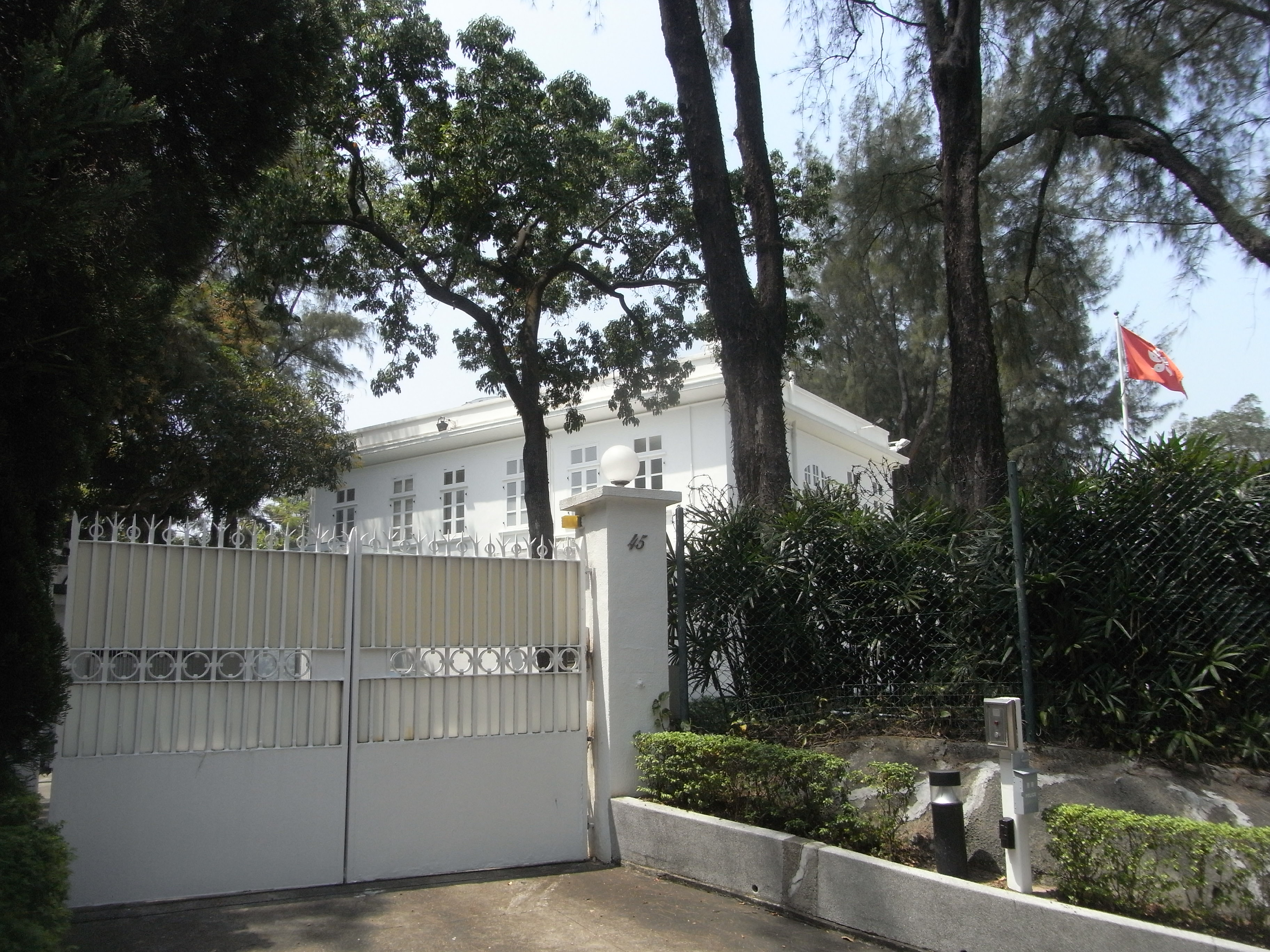
Residence of the Financial Secretary.

The Financial Secretary's residence is on 45 Shouson Hill Road in Deep Water Bay. It is listed as a grade 2 building. Described as a two-story neo-Georgian style residence built in 1935 and originally owned by Sir Shouson Chow as his own residence. The first Financial Secretary who moved into the building was Sir Charles Geoffrey Shield Follows.
