= Geoffrey Follows =

British colonial administrator (1896–1983)

Sir Charles Geoffry Shield Follows CMG (4 July 1896 – 7 August 1983) was a British colonial administrator. He was the Financial Secretary of Hong Kong from 1946 to 1951.

== Early life and education ==
Follows (whose second name is also spelt Geoffrey) was born in West Derby, Lancashire, to Arthur John Follows and Gertrude Lancaster. He was educated at Wellington School, Somerset and Imperial College London's Royal College of Science (then part of the University of London).

== Career ==
Follows served as a Lieutenant in The King's (Liverpool Regiment) in the First World War. He joined the colonial service after the war. He was appointed to Seychelles from 1920 to 1925, Gibraltar from 1925 to 1927, Northern Rhodesia as the Chief Secretary from 1935 to 1945.

He was appointed Chief Financial Advisor to the Civil Affairs Unit in Hong Kong's post-war military administration reporting to David MacDougall (Chief Civil Affairs Officer).

When civilian government was restored on 1 May 1946 he was appointed Financial Secretary of Hong Kong under governor Sir Mark Young. Follows outlined his financial strategy for Hong Kong to the Legislative Council on 25 July 1946. His first objective was to facilitate a rapid recovery after the period of occupation; and his second was to be financially independent of Britain as soon as possible. He oversaw a rapid recovery in the post-war economy of Hong Kong.

By running significant budget surpluses within a year of taking office, he made Hong Kong financially independent of UK government support, and in October 1948 the UK government granted Hong Kong a significant degree of financial independence.

Follows introduced the Inland Revenue Bill (1947) which made the temporary pre-war introduction of income tax permanent.

In budget forecasting he established a tradition of conservatism, with revenues usually underestimated and costs usually overestimated versus out-turns. Subsequent Financial Secretaries were to adopt the same approach.

He gave his last budget in the spring of 1951. He left Hong Kong on pre-retirement leave in May 1951.

He retired to Harare, Zimbabwe, where he died in 1983.

== Honours ==
Follows was appointed a Companion of the Order of St Michael and St George (CMG) in the 1945 New Year Honours and was knighted in the 1951 New Year Honours.

Government offices
Preceded by Japanese occupation of Hong Kong	Financial Secretary of Hong Kong; 1946–1951	Succeeded by Arthur Grenfell Clarke
