= John Chan =

Hong Kong civil servant and executive

The Honourable John Chan GBS, CBE, LVO, JP
- 陳祖澤
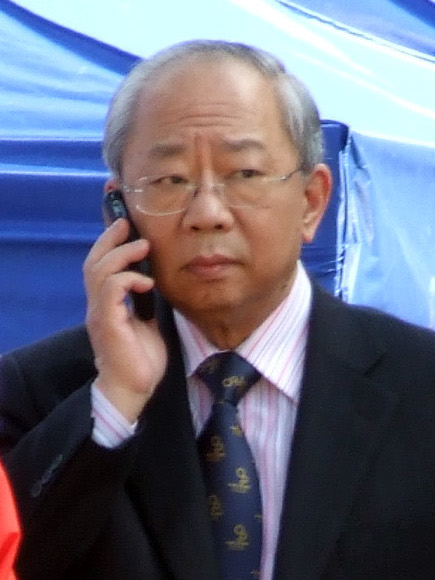

Deputy Chief Secretary
- In office 23 March 1987 – 28 February 1989
- Governor: Sir David Akers-Jones (Acting); Sir David Wilson
- Preceded by: Alan James Scott
- Succeeded by: Office Abolished; Michael Suen (as Secretary for Constitutional Affairs)

Secretary for Trade and Industry
- In office 1989–1991
- Preceded by: Hamish Macleod
- Succeeded by: Brian Chau

Secretary for Education and Manpower
- In office 1991–1993
- Preceded by: Yeung Kai-yin
- Succeeded by: Michael Leung

Personal details
- Born: April 8, 1943 (age 83) Hong Kong, Japan
- Spouse: Agnes Wong Wai-Chun
- Children: Peter Chan See-Yuen; Catherine Chan See-Kay
- Parent(s): Chan Kai Kit; Wong Yuk Ying
- Education: University of Hong Kong
- Occupation: Executive in Government and Organizations

John Chan Cho Chak
- Traditional Chinese: 陳祖澤
- Simplified Chinese: 陈祖泽
Transcriptions
Standard Mandarin
- Hanyu Pinyin: Chén Zǔzé
Yue: Cantonese
- Jyutping: can4 zou2 zaak6

John Chan Cho Chak, GBS, CBE, LVO, JP (born 8 April 1943) is a Hong Kong civil servant and executive. He currently serves as a non-executive director of Transport International Holdings Limited, The Kowloon Motor Bus Company (1933) Limited, Long Win Bus Company Limited, RoadShow Holdings Limited, Hang Seng Bank Limited, Guangdong Investment Limited and Swire Properties Limited. He was a long-time civil servant and one of the most senior Chinese officials in the Hong Kong Government under British rule.

== Education ==
In 1964, Chan graduated with Honours from the University of Hong Kong in English Literature. He later obtained a Diploma in Management Studies from the University of Hong Kong.

He has been awarded the degrees of Doctor of Business Administration honoris causa by the International Management Centres in 1997 and Doctor of Social Sciences honoris causa by the Hong Kong University of Science and Technology in 2009 and the University of Hong Kong in March 2011.

== Career ==
After Chan's graduation from the University of Hong Kong, Chan joined the Hong Kong Government as an Administrative Officer from 1964 and 1978 and from 1980 to 1993.

Chan has held many key positions in the Hong Kong Government, including: Private Secretary to Governor Murray MacLehose, Deputy Secretary (General Duties), Director of Information Services, Deputy Chief Secretary, Secretary for Trade and Industry and Secretary for Education and Manpower. He also served as a Member of the Executive Council from October 1992 to May 1993. In the private sector, Chan also held a number of important positions including: Executive Director and General Manager of Sun Hung Kai Finance Company Limited (1978-1980), managing director of The Kowloon Motor Bus Company (1933) Limited (1993-2006) and managing director of Transport International Holdings Limited (1997-2008).

Chan has held a wide range of public and community service positions such as, Non-executive Director of The Hong Kong Exchanges and Clearing Limited (1999-2003), Chairman of the Council of The Hong Kong University of Science and Technology (2002-2008) and Chairman of The Hong Kong Jockey Club (2006-2010). Chan currently serves as Chairman of the Council of the Sir Edward Youde Memorial Fund, Chairman of the Court of The Hong Kong University of Science and Technology and a member of the Exchange Fund Advisory Committee.

== Awards ==
In 1994, Chan was appointed as a Justice of the Peace (JP). In 1999, he received the Gold Bauhinia Star. In 2000, he won the Executive Award in the DHL/SCMP Hong Kong Business Awards and received an Honorary Fellowship from the University of Hong Kong.

Sporting positions
Preceded by Ronald Arculli	Chairman of the Hong Kong Jockey Club; 2006–2010	Succeeded by T. B. Stevenson
