= Kowloon-Canton Railway Corporation =

Government-owned railway services company in Hong Kong

- Native name: 九廣鐵路公司
- Type: Government-owned corporation, statutory corporation
- Industry: Asset management, former public transport operator
- Founded: 24 December 1982; 43 years ago
- Headquarters: 8th Floor, Fo Tan Railway House, 9 Lok King Street, Fo Tan, New Territories, Hong Kong
- Number of locations: Hong Kong
- Area served: Hong Kong
- Revenue: 431 million Hong Kong Dollars (2021)
- Operating income: HK$ 387 million (2021)
- Net income: HK$ -2.155 billion (2021)
- Total assets: HK$ 76.126 billion (2021)
- Total equity: HK$ 51.101 billion (2021)
- Owner: Hong Kong Government (100%)

Chinese name
- Traditional Chinese: 九廣鐵路公司
- Simplified Chinese: 九广铁路公司
Transcriptions
Standard Mandarin
- Hanyu Pinyin: Jiǔ Guǎng Tiělù Gōngsī
Yue: Cantonese
- Yale Romanization: Gáugwóng Titlouh Gūngsī
- Jyutping: Gau^{2}gwong^{2} Tit^{3}lou^{6} Gung^{1}si^{1}
- Website: www.kcrc.com

The Kowloon-Canton Railway Corporation (KCRC; Chinese: 九廣鐵路公司) is a Hong Kong wholly government-owned railway and land asset manager. It was established in 1982 under the Kowloon-Canton Railway Corporation Ordinance for the purposes of operating the Kowloon–Canton Railway (KCR), and to construct and operate other new railways. On 2 December 2007, the MTR Corporation Limited (MTRCL), another railway operator in Hong Kong, took over the operations of the KCR network under a 50-year service concession agreement, which can be extended. Under the service concession, KCRC retains ownership of the KCR network with the MTRCL making annual payments to KCRC for the right to operate the network. The KCRC's activities are governed by the KCRC Ordinance as amended in 2007 by the Rail Merger Ordinance to enable the service concession agreement to be entered into with the MTR Corporation Limited.

The XRL Hong Kong Section and the Sha Tin to Central Link have since been injected by the Hong Kong Government into the KCRC.

== History ==
From 1910 to 1982, the KCR network was operated as a department of the Hong Kong Government. The Kowloon-Canton Railway Corporation was created in December 1982 after the government decided to corporatise its railway department. Until 2007, the KCRC owned and operated a network of heavy rail, light rail and feeder bus routes within Kowloon and the New Territories. It was also a land developer by utilising its property development rights atop and around railway stations and depots. In December 2007, it ceased railway operations, with its business becoming primarily that of earning revenue from being the holder of railway assets. While it continues to own the rail network, the network is operated by the MTR Corporation under a 50-year service concession, for which the MTR Corporation Limited makes annual payments to the KCRC.

=== An expanding network ===
During the electrification of the KCR in the 1970s and early 1980s, thought had been given by the government as to the future management of the railway. Before 1982, the Kowloon–Canton Railway had been run as a department of the government, and was subject to the normal civil service rules and requirements. This made it difficult to take a commercial approach to operating what was increasingly becoming a major business in investment and revenue terms. Corporatisation of public services as a means to permit government-owned public utilities to operate more along the lines of private sector business was an approach that was beginning to gather interest at the time from several governments – the US and UK governments under Reagan and Thatcher being prime movers. The object of corporatisation was to allow the public service providers to make a commercial return on their assets, thus reducing the need for investment of public funds raised predominantly from taxes, while still remaining under government control.

On 24 December 1982, the KCRC Ordinance (Cap 372) was enacted and the KCR ceased to be a government department, although it remained wholly owned by the government. Under the Ordinance a managing board, comprising 10 members appointed by the governor (Chairman, managing director and not less than 4 nor more than 8 other members), became responsible for overseeing the day-to-day operations of the Corporation. The Corporation was required to "perform its functions with a view to achieving a rate of return on the assets employed in its undertaking, and in accordance with ordinary commercial criteria, is satisfactory."

The KCR expanded its operations starting in 1984. It accepted an invitation from the government to build and operate a light rail network in the north western New Territories serving the local public transport needs of the future residents of the Tuen Mun and Yuen Long new towns.

The first choice of operator for this network had not in fact been KCR, nor had the construction of a light rail network been decided when the plans for the new towns were first drawn up. Originally the focus had been on Tuen Mun, with the new town being planned from the outset with an 'exclusive public transport right of way' segregated from the ordinary road network. In 1977 the government commissioned Swiss Electrowatt Engineering and Scott Wilson Kirkpatrick & Partners, both as the engineering consultants for the Tuen Mun new town, to undertake the Tuen Mun Transport Study. This involved the evaluation of the respective merits and demerits of various modes of public transport to determine which would best meet the needs of the area.

The final selection came down to a choice of one of three systems – double-deck diesel powered buses, electrically powered trolley buses, and electrically powered light rail vehicles supported by diesel buses serving less densely populated areas or where steeper gradients limited the use of light rail vehicles. Diesel buses, although unquestionably more flexible in operation and requiring far lower initial capital costs, because they did not rely on fixed overhead power lines and tracks like trolley buses and light rail vehicles, were ruled out on grounds of air pollution.

Trolley buses were ruled out on grounds of capital costs, in that the purchase price of a trolley bus was twice that of a diesel bus but offered no greater passenger carrying capacity. They also offered less operational flexibility in that they required the provision of a fixed overhead power line. It was recognised, however, that a case for the use of trolley buses over diesel buses might made were the relative costs of diesel fuel versus electrical power to change.

The consultants' final report of November 1978 recommended the construction of a light rail system. The consultants argued that a light rail system offered "the best technical and economic solution to the future travel needs of Tuen Mun. Such a system would, moreover, help to promote and develop the image of the new town." Light rail vehicles would offer greater passenger carrying capacity than buses, and, although initially more expensive to purchase than diesel or trolley buses, their economic life of around 50 years was far longer than that for diesel and trolley buses of around 15 years. The consultants estimated that over 30 years the light rail system would provide an 8% return on assets assuming an annual discount rate of 15% and an annual inflation rate of 7%. The study finally also recommended the extension of the light railway system to the Yuen Long new town.

The consultants proposed the use of double deck trams each carrying 247 passengers (diesel buses then in operation could each only carry about half that number). The use of single deck trams was ruled out on the grounds of capital cost because of the need to purchase a larger number of vehicles to provide the same total passenger carrying capacity for the system. It would later transpire that no light rail vehicle manufacturer could offer such double deck vehicles and none were prepared to invest in the manufacturing capacity needed to build such vehicles given the relatively small number required. Ultimately single deck vehicles had to be ordered, which although longer at 20.2 metres, can only achieve a similar maximum passenger capacity of around 238 passengers by having all but 26 passengers standing.

Capital Cost Comparison of Different Systems Based on 15 km of Light Rail Track Plus 10 km of Bus Feeder Routes	Capital Cost (HK$ million)
Diesel buses	60
Trolley buses	109
Double-deck light rail	164
Single-deck light rail	266
Source: Tuen Mun Transport Study 1978, Volume 1	

These recommendations came at the same time as the government was examining proposals for a mass transit system along the north of Hong Kong Island. As explained by the Secretary for Transport in the Legislative Council on 5 July 1978, the government had asked the then Mass Transit Railway Corporation (MTRC) to plan the construction of a mass transit light rail system on HK Island more or less along the alignment of Hong Kong Tramways' existing line, which had been in operation since 1904 and lacked the capacity to handle anticipated future public transport demands. If MTRC's plan was viable, the government would exercise its option under Section 30 of Tramways Ordinance to buy out the existing tramway operation.

Section 30 of the Ordinance required the government to acquire Hong Kong Tramways' land and assets at their full market value. In exchange for the surrender of the Hong Kong Tramways' Hong Kong Island operations, the government indicated its willingness to offer the right to operate the future Tuen Mun light rail system to the company. However, in January 1983 the government announced that it had not been able to reach an agreement with the Kowloon Wharf and Godown Company (the owner of the Hong Kong Tramways). The main sticking points in the negotiations appear to have been the amount of profit that the company would have been allowed to earn from the Tuen Mun light rail network and the granting of property development rights. Also during this time, the decision had been taken to construct the MTR Island line underground as had been the case with the MTRC's earlier Kwun Tong line.

Subsequent discussions with other possible interested parties also failed and in 1984 the government turned to the KCRC to invite it to take on the construction and operation of the light rail network.

The Light Rail Transit (LRT, known later as the KCR Light Rail and currently simply as the Light Rail) came into service in September 1988. Although the system was generally successful in meeting passenger demand, it was never a commercial success. According to the corporation's annual reports, the system showed an annual cash-operating loss up to 2003.

The KCRC started to participate in property development and management at around the same time as constructing Light Rail. The first joint-venture property development, Pierhead Garden, located above a light rail and bus terminus in Tuen Mun, was completed in 1988. While profits generated from property and commercial services were useful to fund new railway projects, they were never regarded as essential, being generally treated as a useful windfall. The chairman of the KCRC, K Y Yeung, highlighted this in his statement made in the 2002 annual report, by pointing out that "our main source or revenue has always been and will continue to be fares. The receipts from property developments are one-off in nature and are not a dependable, long-term source of revenue for the Corporation."

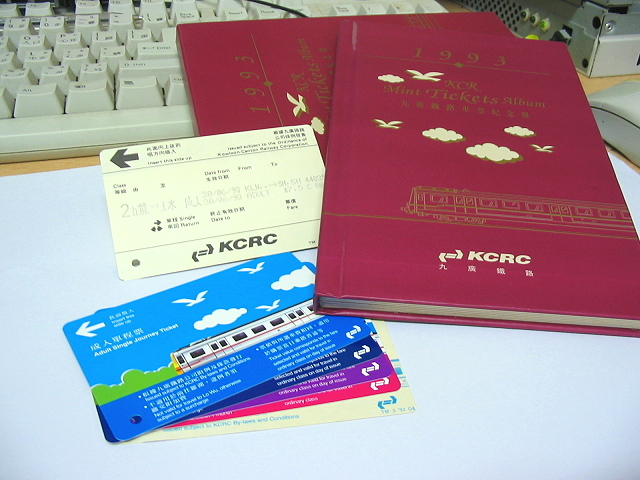
KCR tickets

In 1994 the government published its Railway Development Strategy, which identified the need for a railway to serve the rapidly expanding new towns in the northwestern New Territories. In October 1998 KCR began work on the construction of an entirely new line of some 30.5 km in length, connecting the new towns of Yuen Long, Tin Shui Wai and Tuen Mun with urban Kowloon. Originally estimated to cost HK$64 billion, the government agreed to make an equity injection of HK$29 billion to assist the corporation, with the remaining funds coming either from the corporation's own reserves or through borrowings in the open market. In return the corporation agreed to undertake property development along the line, the profits from which (then estimated to be in excess of HK$20 billion) being returned to the government.

The government also enacted an amendment to the KCR Ordinance in 1998. The purpose of the amendment was to enable the corporation to build new railway projects (other than East Rail and Light Rail) and to raise commercial loans. Also included in the amendment was the removal of the requirement on the corporation to make a return on its fixed assets. This was particularly important as it was recognised that the heavy capital investment in new railways would not enable the corporation to make a commercial return for a good number of years on what would become a far larger asset holding. The basic requirement now placed on the corporation was that. "The Corporation shall conduct its business according to prudent commercial principles and shall ensure as far as possible that, taking one year with another, its revenue is at least sufficient to meet its expenditure."

The KCR West Rail (later the West Rail Line, now the Tuen Ma line on the MTR network) was finally opened on 20 December 2003. As a result of extensive value engineering exercises, the final cost of the project came in much lower than originally forecast at HK$46.6 billion.

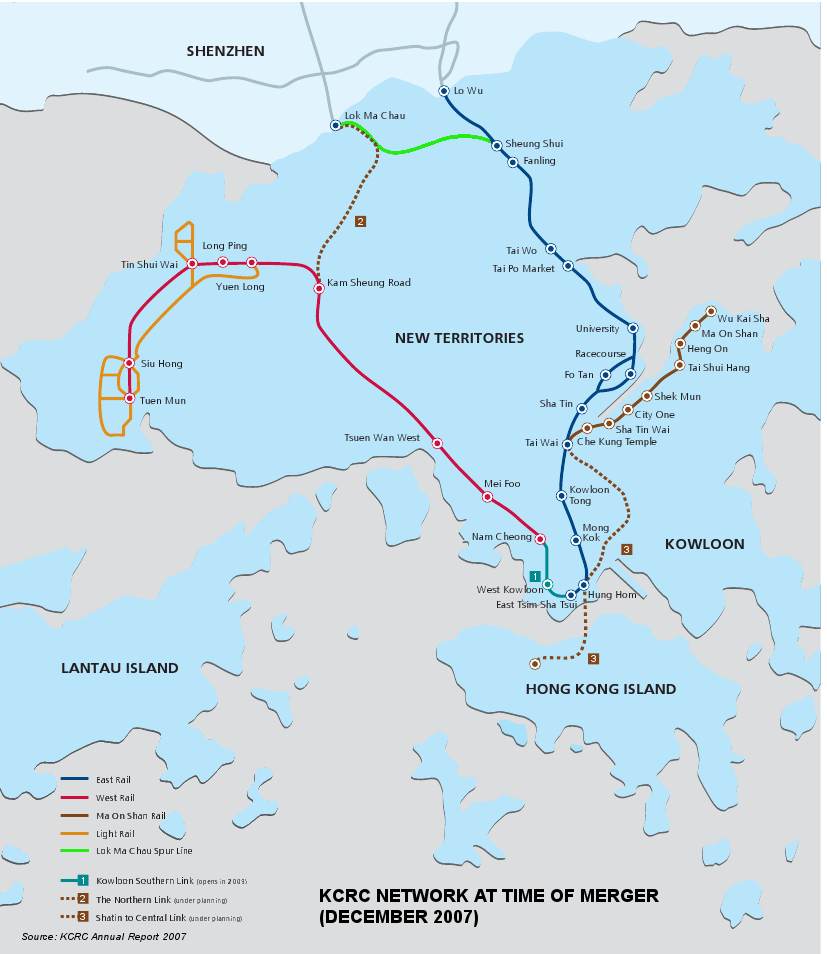
KCR rail network as of December 2007

The following year two extensions to the East Rail network were commissioned, both lines also forming part of the government's Railway Development Strategy. In October 2004 the KCR East Rail (now the East Rail line on the MTR network) was extended from Hung Hom station to East Tsim Sha Tsui station, enabling KCR services to return to a location close to the original 1910 KCR terminus. In December 2004 Ma On Shan Rail (now the Ma On Shan line on the MTR network) was opened, linking Wu Kai Sha with East Rail at Tai Wai station. Some three years later, in August 2007, a third extension, the Lok Ma Chau Spur Line came into service. Extending from East Rail at Sheung Shui to a second cross-boundary terminal at Lok Ma Chau, the Spur Line was intended to alleviate congestion for cross-boundary travellers at the existing Lo Wu terminal and to provide a convenient connection to the Shenzhen Metro system.

In 2000, the government published its updated Railway Development Strategy. Included was a proposal by KCR to construct a 3.8 km extension to the West Rail line from Nam Cheong station to East Tsim Sha Tsui station, with the existing section of East Rail line from Hung Hom station to East Tsim Sha Tsui station being modified to become part of the extended West Rail line. Known as the Kowloon Southern Link (KSL), the extension, with a new intermediate station at Austin Road, was completed and opened for passenger services on 16 August 2009.

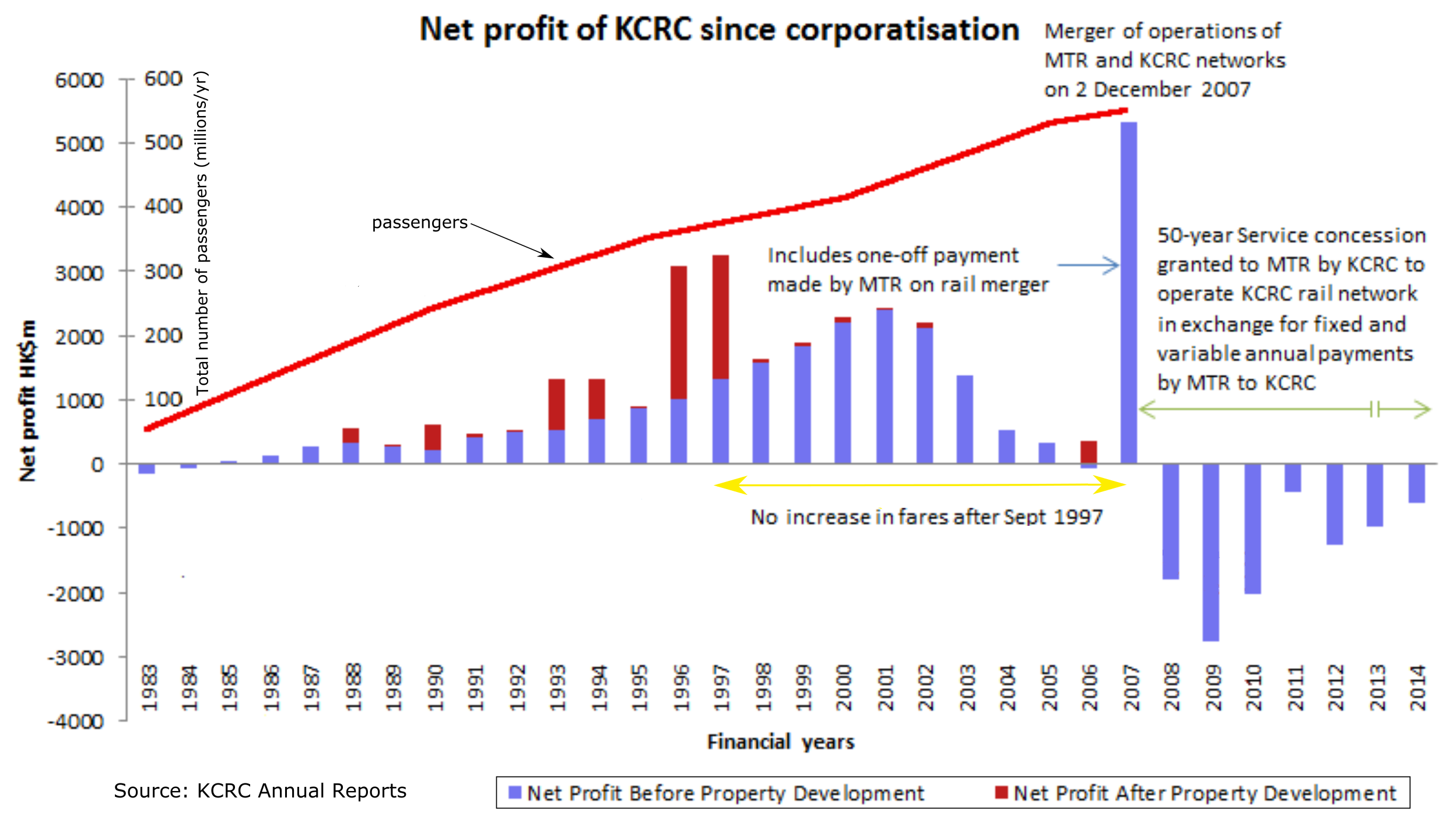
Chart showing net profits of KCR from 1983 to 2014

The financial impact of all these new projects can be seen in the declining net profits of the corporation from 2001. Despite increasing passengers, heavy interest expenses on borrowings and depreciation charges on the new assets pushed net profits down to close to zero by the end of 2007. However, if non-cash depreciation charges are excluded, which rose from about HK$700 million in 2001 to HK$2,400 million by 2007, the corporation continued to show a cash operating profit.

Of interest also is that the last fare increase made by the corporation was in 1997. Although proposals were put forward to increase fares over the subsequent 10 years to provide comfort that the corporation would be able to service its increasing debt portfolio created by the need to fund the expansion of the KCR network, these came to naught in light of economic and political pressures. The chairman and chief executive, K.Y. Yeung, most eloquently explained the "catch-22" situation faced by the corporation in his statement contained in the 2001 annual report.

"While the Corporation has autonomy to decide fares, we face the classic dilemma of most publicly owned transport operators when it comes to raising fares. On the one hand, in the current period of economic deflation, there is considerable pressure on public transport operators not to increase fares so as to share the burden of the community. On the other hand, when inflation returns, there will be equal pressure on operators to keep any fare increases below the rate of inflation so as not to fuel inflation.

The longer term implications of this dilemma for the Corporation are obvious. A way has to be found out of this situation if we are to fund new projects. We must try to devise a consistent policy in respect of fare increases which will allow us to demonstrate to investors that we can generate the necessary stable revenue stream in the medium to long term and which, at the same time, will also allow us to demonstrate to our passengers that our fares will remain competitive with those of alternative modes of public transport."

Of critical concern to the corporation was the gradual erosion of its cross-boundary market, where for many years it had enjoyed the majority share and was able charge a fare premium. The corporation faced increasing competition from road transport operators, mainly coach operators, following the opening of a number of major crossing points providing convenient road access to Shenzhen and southern China. Profits from this segment of the corporation's transport operations were considered vital to subsidise its domestic services which in general operated at a loss.

=== Ceased to be a public transport operator ===
During the construction of the KSL, KCRC ceased to be a public transport operator. The government's Railway Development Strategy 2000 proposed the construction of a new line to link up the northeastern New Territories and the central business area of Hong Kong Island, to be called the Sha Tin to Central Link (SCL). Competitive proposals were invited from both KCRC and the MTR Corporation Limited (MTRCL) to design, build and operate the new line. On 25 June 2002 the government announced that KCRC had won the bid. In the same announcement the government said that, as a separate issue, the chief executive in Council had also instructed the Administration to consider the feasibility of merging the MTRCL and the KCRC into a single rail company.

Following five years of negotiations and the enactment of the Rail Merger Ordinance after its passage through the Legislative Council, the KCRC ceased to be a public transport operator on 2 December 2007, becoming thereafter primarily simply the holder of railway assets. Instead of being the operator of those assets, KCRC granted MTRCL the right to operate KCRC's rail and feeder bus network under a service concession agreement for an initial period of 50 years, which may be extended. In return MTRCL was required to make an upfront payment to KCRC of HK$4.25 billion for the service concession and certain short-lived railway assets of KCRC such as stores and spares, and thereafter a fixed annual payment of HK$750 million and, commencing 36 months after the date of the merger (i.e. 2 December 2010), an additional variable annual payment calculated according to a pre-agreed set of sharing ratios as follows –

- 10% for gross revenue earned by MTRCL from the KCRC railway assets exceeding HK$2.5 billion and up to HK$5 billion for the year;
- 15% for gross revenue between HK$5 billion and HK$7.5 billion for the year; and
- 35% for gross revenue beyond HK$7.5 billion for the year.

MTRCL also paid KCRC HK$7.79 billion on the merger for the acquisition of property and other related commercial interests.

KCRC and MTRCL remain as separate entities. KCRC employs a small number of management staff answerable to its Managing Board, with specialist legal, financial and other support being provided through outsourcing and consultancy arrangements. The Corporation's key responsibilities include overseeing and fulfilling its obligations with respect to its service concession with the MTRCL, raising new financing as needed to service its debts (over HK$10 billion was raised in 2009), ensuring compliance with its obligations under a number of cross-border leases covering its rolling stock and other assets, and being the majority shareholder for West Rail Property Development Limited, which is responsible for the development of some 13 residential property sites along West Rail. In addition to the revenue earned from the concession payments made by the MTRCL, it earns rental revenue from leasing out four floors of Citylink Plaza above Sha Tin station. KCRC also retains a 22.1% shareholding in Octopus Holdings Limited (OHL), which was first established in 2005 and is owned by the major public transport operators in Hong Kong. OHL is the holding company of Octopus Cards Limited, which is a world leader in smart card payment systems used not only for making public transport journeys within Hong Kong but also for making small purchases in supermarkets and other convenience stores.

KCRC also remained responsible for funding the full construction costs of the KSL, which was under construction at the time of the merger, with the MTRCL paid a fee for project managing the works. KCRC also funded the purchase of 22 additional light rail vehicles needed to accommodate the increase in patronage expected on light rail feeder routes to West Rail stations as a result of the opening of the KSL. MTRCL assumed responsibility for operating the KSL and the new light rail vehicles under the service concession.

Although the corporation's annual revenues saw a sharp decline from over HK$5.5 billion before the merger to less than HK$1 billion immediately after the merger, its operating costs similarly declined. The corporation was also fortunate in being able to refinance a substantial portion of its large debt portfolio during the low interest environment that prevailed during 2009 and 2010. This reduced the corporation's interest costs by more than half because the effective interest rate on its debt fell from above 7% to around 3%. Excluding non-cash depreciation charges, the corporation enjoys a cash operating profit, which should continue to increase over time as reflected in MTRCL's variable annual payments.

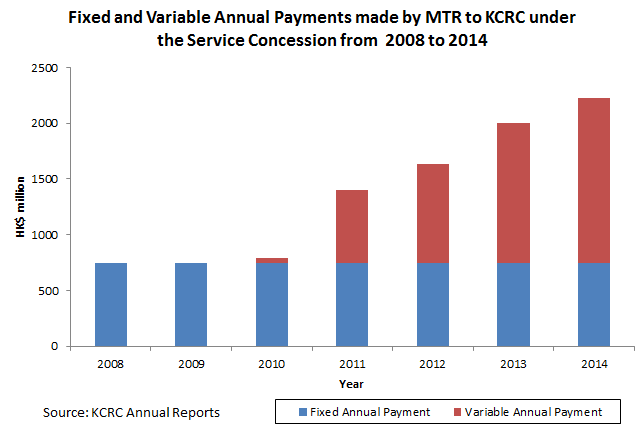
Chart showing fixed and variable annual payments made to KCRC by MTR

The variable annual payment for 2010 was HK$45 million, covering the period from 2 to 31 December 2010 only. For the first full year of 2011 the variable annual payment was HK$647 million. By 2013 the annual variable payment had increased to HK$1,247 million. With the HK$750 million fixed annual payment, the total cash payment made by MTRCL under the Service Concession for 2013 was HK$1.997 billion.

== Plans ==
After the announcement in June 2002 that KCRC had won the bid to design, build and operate the SCL, the corporation proceeded with detailed planning for the project. In 2005, however, work was suspended pending an announcement by the Government of its decision on how and by whom the SCL would in fact be constructed. By this time KCRC had incurred some HK$1.188 billion in costs on the project.

Following the rail merger, the government took over responsibility for the project. According to the government's latest plan as explained to the Legislative Council in March 2008, the cost of building the SCL will be borne by the government, with MTRCL given responsibility for managing the design and construction of the line. The government has indicated that it may vest the completed line in, or lease the line to, KCRC, which would then grant an additional service concession to the MTRCL to operate the line. KCRC has indicated that such an arrangement would enable recovery of the corporation's earlier costs on the project.

== Executive management ==
The following table lists year with chairmen, managing directors, CEOs and chief officers since corporatisation.

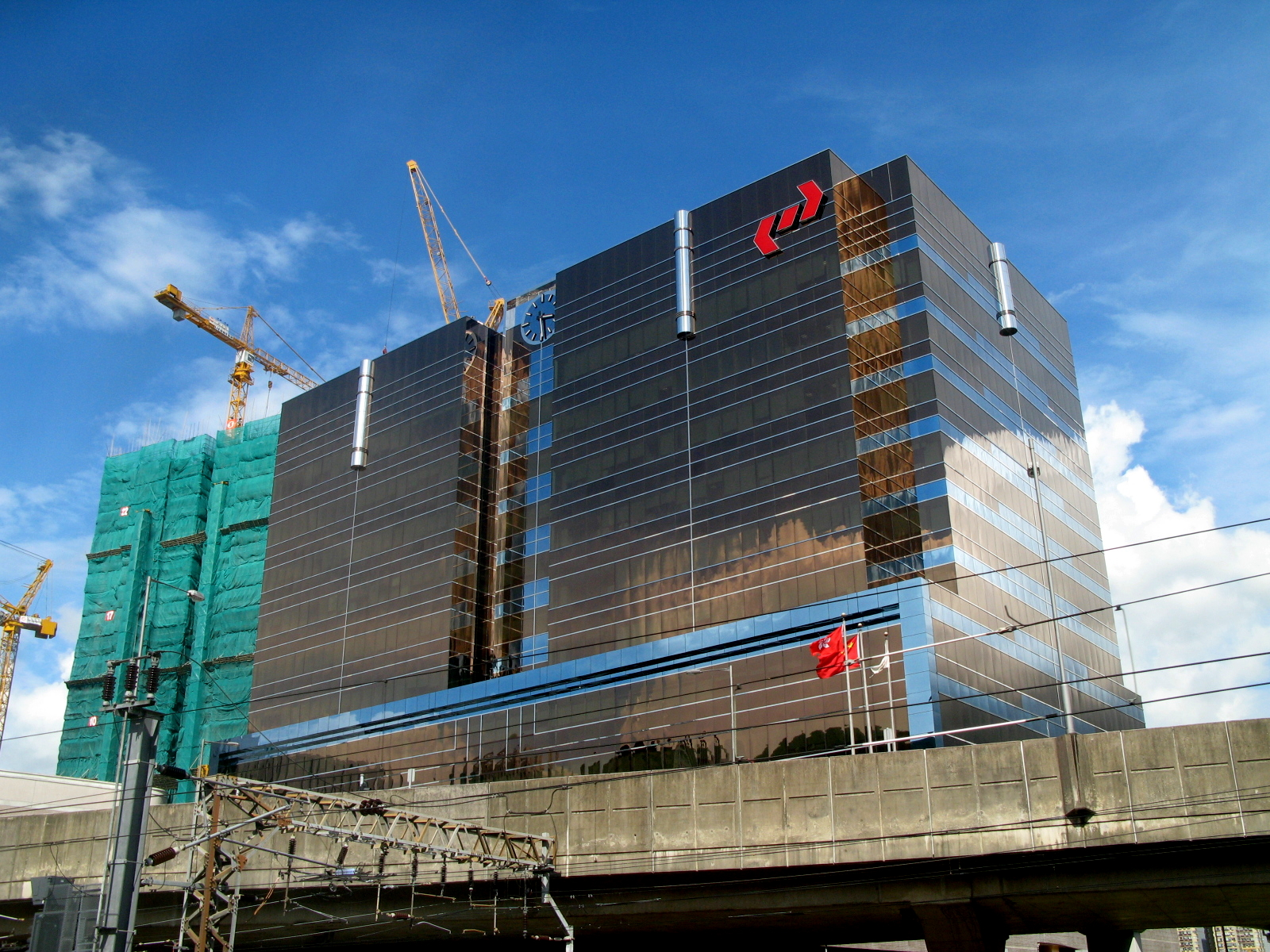
KCRC House in Fo Tan served as corporate headquarters since the building opened in 1995.

Year/Name	Title
1983	
H M G Forsgate	Chairman
D M Howes	MD (until 18 December)
P V Quick	MD (from 19 December)
1984 to 1989	
H M G Forsgate	Chairman
P V Quick	MD
1990	
H M G Forsgate	Chairman (until 23 December)
P V Quick	MD (until 31 August)
Kevin O Hyde	Chairman and chief executive (from 24 December)
1991 to 1995	
Kevin O Hyde	Chairman and chief executive
1996	
Kevin O Hyde	Chairman and chief executive (until 23 December)
Kai-yin Yeung	Chairman and chief executive (from 24 December)
1997 to 2000	
Kai-yin Yeung	Chairman and chief executive
2001	
Kai-yin Yeung	Chairman and chief executive (until 23 December)
Michael Tien	Chairman (from 24 December)
Kai-yin Yeung	Chief executive officer (from 24 December)
2002 and 2003	
Michael Tien	Chairman
Kai-yin Yeung	Chief executive officer
2004 and 2005	
Michael Tien	Chairman
Samuel Lai	Acting chief executive officer
2006	
Michael Tien	Chairman
Samuel Lai	Acting chief executive officer (until 30 April)
James Blake	Chief executive officer (from 1 May)
2007	
Michael Tien	Chairman (until 1 December)
James Blake	Chief executive officer (until 1 December)
Prof K C Chan	Chairman (from 2 December)
James Blake	Chief officer (from 2 December)
2008 to 2012	
Prof K C Chan	Chairman
James Blake	Chief officer
2013 to present	
Prof K C Chan	Chairman
Edmund K H Leung	Chief officer

== Corporate governance ==
From corporatisation in December 1982 until the rail merger 25 years later, corporate governance issues periodically troubled the corporation. Reflecting this were the changes that took place in the relationship between the chairman of the managing board and the head of the executive management team.

Initially the root causes of this were the commercial and political tensions arising from the change from a government department to an organisation expected to operate in a prudent commercial manner so as to make a return on its fixed assets. While expected to make a profit to comply with its mandate under the KCRC Ordinance, because the corporation remained 100% government owned, it faced at the same time strong public and political pressure not to increase fares. These difficulties were further complicated by corporate governance issues involving senior management and members of the corporation's managing board.

At corporatisation the positions of (non-executive) chairman of the managing board and that of the (executive) managing director were separate, with the managing director answerable to the board for the day-to-day business of the corporation. D M (Bobby) Howes, the previous general manager of KCR remained for a few months until his successor, Peter Quick, took up the post. Unlike Howes, who was a traditional railway man, Quick came from a commercial background, and from the outset, adopted a strong commercial approach to the operation of the railway. His efforts were reflected in the gradually increasing profitability of the corporation.

However, as a result of public controversy in late 1988 over claimed "golden handshakes" paid to two senior executives as a result of termination of their services, and in 1989 a fare increase with the corporation already enjoying a significant profit, the government took the decision that both the chairman and the managing director should leave upon expiry of their period of office.

At the end of 1990, with the appointment of Kevin Hyde, a Lawyer and the former chief executive of New Zealand Railways Corporation, the two formerly separate positions were combined into the single position of chairman and chief executive. During his tenure, Hyde oversaw unprecedented growth in the business as well as spearheading a number of significant commercial and engineering projects, including the West Rail Project. Hyde forged new and productive working relationships with the KCRC's Mainland counterparts and Ministry Officials leading to a number of co-operative projects on both sides of the border. He also introduced a 'post-colonial' ethos within the business, actively developing and promoting local executives and expertise. Hyde left in 1996 having decided that it was important that the business entered the 1997 handover with a local person in the position of chairman and chief executive.

He was replaced by K Y Yeung, a former senior civil servant with the Hong Kong government. While the KCRC continued to prosper financially, K Y Yeung's style of management, founded as it was in his civil service background, did not sit well with some.

In December 2001, the government enacted an amendment to the KCRC Ordinance to provide for the separation of the functions and duties of the chairman from those of the chief executive by creating the office of chief executive officer (CEO), who also became a member of the managing board. The government argued that, with the then planned expansion of the railway network, there was a growing need to separate the strategic planning functions and day-to-day management responsibilities of KCRC. Enacting legislation to separate the functions and duties of the chairman and the CEO was intended to put in place an effective governance structure to ensure transparency, accountability and responsibility. By strengthening the independence of the KCRC board and providing clear lines of reporting, there would be improved checks and balances over senior management.

Unfortunately, as set out in a paper by the legal adviser to Hong Kong's Legislative Council, the amendments did not spell out in detail the duties and functions of the chairman and the CEO, or at least their responsibilities. The government argued that this would not be appropriate as it was important for KCRC, which operated along prudent commercial principles, to retain the flexibility to determine and fine-tune the relationship between the managing board (led by the chairman) and the executives (led by the CEO) to suit its operational needs and the prevailing corporate practices which change over time. This deliberate lack of clarity arguably sowed the seed for a future controversy.

Michael Tien, a businessman, was subsequently appointed as the chairman, with the former chairman and chief executive, K Y Yeung, stepping down to become the CEO. It rapidly became publicly evident, however, that there was personal tension between the two, exemplified by Michael Tien's denial that he was a good friend of K Y Yeung when the two briefed the media in 2002 on the findings of the investigation into the Siemens incident. (The investigation dealt with the payment of an additional HK$100 million to Siemens under a supplementary agreement to the telecommunications contract for the West Rail project, and the interaction between the managing board and the executive management team.)

The situation did not improve with K Y Yeung's departure at the end of 2003, following the opening of West Rail. At the heart of the problem was the lack of clarity in the respective roles and responsibilities of the chairman and the CEO. On 9 March 2006, with the signed support of all 5 operations directors and 19 managers, the Acting chief executive officer, Samuel Lai, wrote to the Managing Board to complain about the leadership style of the chairman. Around 80% of the staff signed in support of Lai. In Lai's letter he stated that little had changed since 2001, and that the necessary distinctions between the different but complementary roles of the executive and non-executive functions frequently became blurred, with the chairman interfering in how day-today matters should be handled.

On the following day, Michael Tien met the Chief Executive of Hong Kong, Donald Tsang. In the afternoon of 12 March 2006, Tien announced his resignation, with the effective date to be determined by Tsang. After further negotiation, Tien withdrew his resignation. The KCRC managing board convened a meeting on 14 March 2006 and decided on a set of measures to more clearly delineate the work of the chairman and CEO.

While the board meeting was being held, 20 of the corporation's senior executives met the media in a room next to where the board meeting was being held. The managing board considered this to be a very serious matter, and that the incident had caused serious damage to the reputation and image of the corporation. A further meeting of the board was held the next day on 15 March 2006. The board decided to terminate the employment contract of one of the 20 senior executives and to issue warning letters to the remaining 19. At the meeting Lai resigned. The reason given in the government's paper to the Legislative Council's Panel on Transport was because Lai, being the CEO, felt that he should be held responsible for the acts of his staff. Lai, in the personal account given in his book published in 2007 (九天風雲 (English title: The Longest Week)), explained that the original decision of the board had been to sack all 20 senior executives, but by his offering to resign, the board had agreed to dismiss only the senior executive who had acted as the spokesman for the 20 on 14 March.

A civil engineer, James Blake, the former Secretary for Works in the Hong Kong Government and afterwards the Senior Director Projects of the corporation until the end of 2003, took over as the chief executive officer (not acting) at age 71. The incident was seen to have sped up the government's plan to merge the operations of Hong Kong's two railway networks. Lai in his book states that at the board meeting held on 15 March 2006, the first item on the agenda was the appointment of Blake as the deputy CEO responsible for the proposed rail merger, which was raised by the then Secretary for Financial Services and the Treasury on behalf of the government as the sole shareholder of the corporation. The appointment was unanimously approved. With Lai's resignation, the board had then decided to invite Blake to become the CEO. Lai agreed to stay with the corporation for a while longer to ensure a smooth handover to Blake.

Thereafter matters moved fairly swiftly on the merger, resulting in the corporation finally ceasing to be the operator of its railway assets on 2 December 2007.

Until the rail merger, the KCRC Ordinance had required that the corporation appoint a CEO. As part of the Rail Merger Ordinance an amendment was made to the KCRC Ordinance to provide for the post of the CEO to be left vacant should the corporation so decide. On the merger the decision was taken not to fill the post and instead Mr. James Blake, the former CEO, was appointed as the Chief Officer to head the small management team. The composition of the managing board also changed, the number of members being reduced from 10 (of whom only two were government officials) to six (all of whom are government officials), with the chairman of the board being the Secretary for Financial Services and the Treasury.

== See also ==
- MTR Corporation
- Transport in Hong Kong
- List of companies of Hong Kong
- Guangzhou–Shenzhen railway
- Shenzhen Metro
