= Nick Cheuk =

Hong Kong director (born 1987)

- 卓亦謙
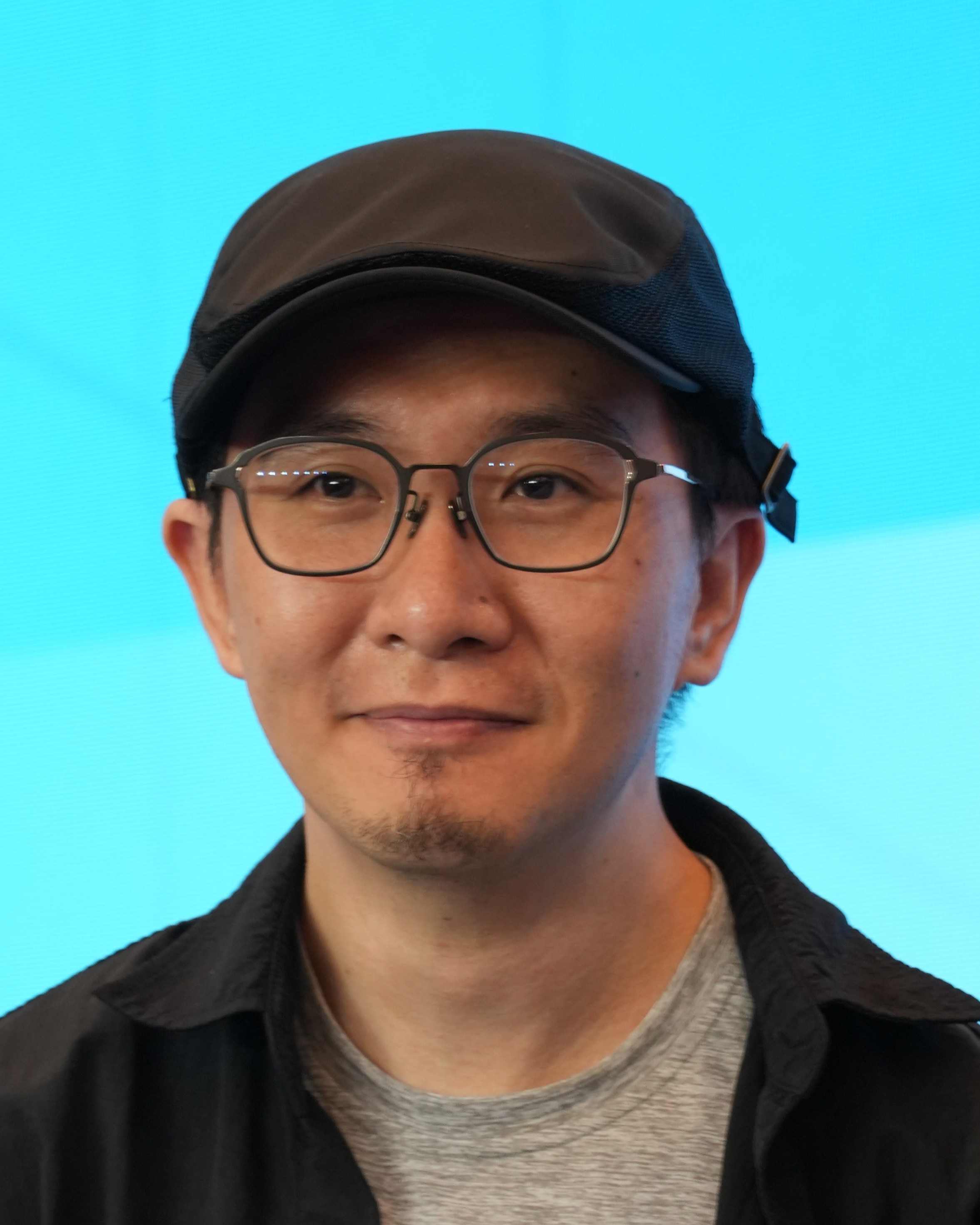
- Cheuk in June 2026
- Born: Cheuk Yick-him; 1987 (age 38–39); Hong Kong
- Education: City University of Hong Kong (BA)
- Occupations: Director; screenwriter
- Years active: 2013–present
- Parent: Warner Cheuk

Nick Cheuk Yick-him (Chinese: 卓亦謙; born 1987) is a Hong Kong director and screenwriter best known for his directorial debut Time Still Turns the Pages (2023), which earned him Best New Director in the 60th Golden Horse Awards and Best New Director in the 42nd Hong Kong Film Awards.

== Early life and education ==
Cheuk was born in 1987 in Hong Kong. He is the son of Warner Cheuk, the incumbent Deputy Chief Secretary for Administration of Hong Kong. He had his secondary education at Raimondi College, the alma mater of his father, but did not perform well academically. However, he became immersed in video editing after creating NBA highlight reels with Windows Movie Maker and received positive feedback on online forums. He also sparked interest in films after watching the 1997 film Good Will Hunting. He had poor relationships with his parents, as his father wanted him to become a lawyer or doctor instead of studying humanities subjects. Only getting 8 marks in the Hong Kong Certificate of Education Examination, his father sent him to a boarding school in Britain after Form 5. He later returned to Hong Kong and attended the City University of Hong Kong to study creative media. He was mentored by director and guest lecturer Patrick Tam, and won silver prize in the 18th Ifva Awards with his graduation project, Waiting to Drown….

== Career ==
After graduating with a Bachelor of Arts in 2012, Cheuk worked as a writer's assistant for sports drama film Unbeatable and action thriller film That Demon Within. In 2017, Cheuk wrote the horror film Zombiology: Enjoy Yourself Tonight, which was his first credited screenplay. He also co-wrote action thriller film Paradox with Jill Leung in the same year.

In 2019, Cheuk applied for and received funding from the Hong Kong Film Development Council's "First Feature Film Initiative" with a screenplay draft of Time Still Turns the Pages. He penned the script in 2015 based on the death of a close friend and university classmate, but altered certain aspects of his friend's experiences to delve into the concerning phenomenon of student suicides in Hong Kong. Cheuk also served as the director and co-editor of the film. The film has gained critical acclaim for its subject matter, atmosphere and writing. Cheuk won Best New Director in the 60th Golden Horse Awards and Best New Director in the 42nd Hong Kong Film Awards, as well as nominations for Best Director, Best Screenplay, Best Editing in the latter.

== Filmography ==
=== Film ===
Year	Title	Writer	Director	Editor	Ref.
2011	Waiting to Drown…	Yes	Yes	Yes	
2013	Unbeatable	Assistant	No	No	
2014	That Demon Within	Assistant	No	No	
2017	Zombiology: Enjoy Yourself Tonight	Yes	No	No	
2017	Paradox	Yes	No	No	
2023	Time Still Turns the Pages	Yes	Yes	Yes	

== Awards and nominations ==
Year	Award	Category	Work	Result	Ref.
2023	25th Golden Goblet Awards	Best Director	Time Still Turns the Pages	Nominated	
2023	60th Golden Horse Awards	Best Original Screenplay	Time Still Turns the Pages	Nominated	
2023	60th Golden Horse Awards	Best Film Editing	Time Still Turns the Pages	Nominated	
2023	60th Golden Horse Awards	Best New Director	Time Still Turns the Pages	Won	
2024	30th Hong Kong Film Critics Society Award	Best Director	Time Still Turns the Pages	Nominated	
2024	30th Hong Kong Film Critics Society Award	Best Screenplay	Time Still Turns the Pages	Nominated	
2024	17th Asian Film Awards	Best New Director	Time Still Turns the Pages	Won	
2024	17th Asian Film Awards	Best Editing	Time Still Turns the Pages	Nominated	
2024	42nd Hong Kong Film Awards	Best Director	Time Still Turns the Pages	Nominated	
2024	42nd Hong Kong Film Awards	Best Screenplay	Time Still Turns the Pages	Nominated	
2024	42nd Hong Kong Film Awards	Best Editing	Time Still Turns the Pages	Nominated	
2024	42nd Hong Kong Film Awards	Best New Director	Time Still Turns the Pages	Won	
