= John Strickland (disambiguation) =

John Strickland is a British director.

John Strickland may also refer to:

- John Estmond Strickland, businessman
- John Strickland (basketball)
