= Denise Yue =

Hong Kong politician

Denise Yue Chung-yee GBS, JP
- 俞宗怡

Secretary for the Civil Service
- In office 24 January 2006 – 30 June 2012
- Preceded by: Joseph Wong
- Succeeded by: Paul Tang

Secretary for the Treasury
- In office 9 April 1998 – 30 June 2002
- Preceded by: Kwong Ki-chi
- Succeeded by: Position abolished

Personal details
- Born: 1952 (age 73–74) Hong Kong
- Education: Belilios Public School; University of Hong Kong (BA in History); Harvard University

Denise Yue
- Traditional Chinese: 俞宗怡
Transcriptions
Standard Mandarin
- Hanyu Pinyin: Yú Zōngyí
Yue: Cantonese
- Yale Romanization: Yùh Jūng yìh
- Jyutping: Jyu^{4} Zung^{1} ji^{4}

Denise Yue Chung-yee (Chinese: 俞宗怡) GBS JP (born 1952) was a Hong Kong politician and Secretary for the Civil Service.

Yue graduated from the University of Hong Kong in 1974 and she attended Harvard University in 1988 obtaining an MPA during her civil service career. She joined the civil service in 1974 and has served in a number of senior positions, including:

- Deputy Director of Regional Services (1991 to 1992)
- Deputy Secretary for Trade and Industry (1992 to 1993)
- Director-General of Industry (1993 to 1995)
- Secretary for Trade and Industry (1995 to 1998)
- Secretary for the Treasury (1998 to 2002)
- Permanent Secretary for Commerce, Industry and Technology (Commerce and Industry) (2002 to 2006)

She later took up the post of Secretary for the Civil Service since January 2006.

== Leung Chin-man controversy ==
In August 2008, Yue was subject of controversy when the former Permanent Secretary for Housing, Planning and Lands, Leung Chin-man was named deputy managing director and executive director of New World China Land. Yue signed off on the approval for Leung to take up the job after it passed through the Advisory committee on post-service employment of civil servants, responsible for vetting the application.

After public outcry amidst widespread suspicion of conflict of interest, Chief Executive Donald Tsang called the Secretary to account. On 15 August, the Civil Service Bureau issued the report requested by Tsang, where they admitted that they had not considered Leung's role in the Hung Hom Peninsula affair when approving his appointment. Sir Donald Tsang asked the SCS to reassess the approval.

New World announced in the early hours of 16 August that Leung had resigned from his post, and would not be seeking compensation from the government for its "inappropriate handling".

A SCMP editorial criticised the "glaring lack of political sense of some of our senior officials." Commentators noted with surprise that there were no demands for Yue's resignation.

A political scientist suggested that parties feared that such calls would alienate civil servants in the forthcoming LegCo elections. Donald Tsang confirmed that he was satisfied with Yue's apology and with the explanations offered by her, and would not be seeking her resignation.

Political offices
Preceded by Chau Tak-hay	Secretary for Commerce and Industry; 1995–1998	Succeeded by Chau Tak-hay
Preceded by Kwong Ki Chi	Secretary for the Treasury; 1998–2002	Succeeded by Frederick Ma as Secretary for Financial Services and the Treasury
Preceded by Joseph Wong	Secretary for the Civil Service; 2006–2012	Succeeded by Paul Tang
Order of precedence
Preceded by Chung Chi-yung; Recipients of the Gold Bauhinia Star	Hong Kong order of precedence Recipients of the Gold Bauhinia Star	Succeeded by Stephen Ip; Recipients of the Gold Bauhinia Star
