= Yeung Kai-yin =

Hong Kong civil servant and businessman (1941–2007)

Yeung Kai-yin GBS CBE JP
- 楊啟彥

Chairman of the Vocational Training Council
- In office 1998–2005
- Preceded by: Samuel Wong
- Succeeded by: Andrew Leung

CEO of the Kowloon Canton Railway Corporation
- In office 24 December 1996 – 31 December 2003
- Preceded by: Kevin Oliver Hyde
- Succeeded by: Ronald James Blake

Chairman of the Kowloon Canton Railway Corporation
- In office 24 December 1996 – 23 December 2001
- Preceded by: Kevin Oliver Hyde
- Succeeded by: Michael Tien

Secretary for the Treasury
- In office 2 May 1991 – 6 May 1993
- Governor: David Wilson
- Preceded by: Hamish Macleod
- Succeeded by: Donald Tsang

Personal details
- Born: 6 January 1941 British Hong Kong
- Died: 8 February 2007 (aged 66) Queen Mary Hospital, Hong Kong
- Education: Diocesan Boys' School
- Alma mater: University of Hong Kong (BA)
- Profession: Civil servant

Yeung Kai-yin
- Traditional Chinese: 楊啟彥
- Simplified Chinese: 杨启彦
Transcriptions
Standard Mandarin
- Hanyu Pinyin: Yáng Qǐyàn
Yue: Cantonese
- Jyutping: joeng4 kai2 jin6

Yeung Kai-yin GBS CBE JP (Chinese: 楊啟彥; 6 January 1941 – 8 February 2007) was a Hong Kong civil servant and businessman. He was the first ethnic Chinese to serve as Secretary for the Treasury, and was later the chairman and CEO of the Kowloon-Canton Railway Corporation.

Yeung's civil service career spanned 32 years, and he was nicknamed the "Godfather of the civil service" for being the first Chinese to serve in many senior positions and for the many precedents that he set during his career.

== Early life and education ==
Yeung was born in 1941 in British Hong Kong as the sixth child of a family with ancestral roots in Zhongshan. He attended Diocesan Boys' School and graduated in 1959, subsequently matriculating at the University of Hong Kong to study history under the King Edward VII Scholarship. He graduated in 1962 with a Bachelor of Arts degree with first-class honours.

== Civil service career (1962-1993) ==
In September 1962, shortly after graduating from university, Yeung joined the Hong Kong government as an administrative officer at the age of 21. He rose quickly through the ranks, serving in a total of 22 positions over the course of his career. He successively became Assistant Director of Education in 1975, Assistant Financial Secretary in 1976, general manager of the Export Credit Insurance Corporation in 1984, and Director-General of Industry in 1986.

In 1989, Yeung was made a policy secretary, equivalent to a cabinet minister, becoming the first Chinese Secretary for Education and Manpower. He was appointed Secretary for the Treasury in 1991 and was also the first Chinese to hold that office. It was speculated at the time that Yeung was in the running to become the first Chinese Chief Secretary of Hong Kong, but he was passed over for appointment by Chris Patten in 1993 in favour of Anson Chan, who had joined the government in the same year as Yeung.

Yeung was known for his "tough" and "forceful" manner, with the SCMP reporting that tales of Yeung giving "abusive dressings down" were common in the civil service. When Yeung was named chairman and CEO of KCRC in 1996, Secretary for Transport Gordon Siu explained that Yeung was the only man "tough enough" for the job.

Yeung's final civil service appointment was as Secretary for Transport in June 1993, a sideways move from his previous role as Secretary for the Treasury. He served until September of the same year, when he resigned from the civil service.

== Later career (1993-2005) ==
In 1993, Yeung became an executive director of Sino Land, a major property developer of Hong Kong and a subsidiary of Tsim Sha Tsui Properties.

In 1996, Yeung served as chairman and chief executive of Kowloon-Canton Railway Corporation (KCRC). During his tenure, the KCRC constructed the West Rail line that links northwestern New Territories (Tuen Mun, Tin Shui Wai and Yuen Long) with Kowloon. Yeung's appointment of fellow retired civil servants in KCRC and conciliatory attitude to the government drew public criticism and brought him into direct conflict with Michael Tien. the subsequent chairman. Yeung's hostile attitude on environmentalist opposition against the use of Long Valley wetland area for the development of Lok Ma Chau Spur Line and misuse of public funds in the Siemens fiasco eventually led to his downfall in 2001.

In 1998, Yeung was appointed chairman of the Vocational Training Council in Hong Kong.

== Personal life ==
On 8 February 2007, Yeung died of legionnaire's disease in Hong Kong. Yeung was cremated at Cape Collinson Crematorium.

== Honours and awards ==
- 1993 Order of the British Empire (CBE)
- 1994 Justice of the Peace (JP)
- 2005 Gold Bauhinia Star (GBS).

== See also ==
- Michael Tien

Political offices
Preceded by Ronald Bridge	Secretary for Education and Manpower; 1989 – 1991	Succeeded by John Chan
Preceded by Sir Hamish Macleod	Secretary for the Treasury; 1991 – 1993	Succeeded by Donald Tsang
Preceded by Michael Leung	Secretary for Transport; 1993	Succeeded by Haider Barma
