= Secretary for the Treasury =

Hong Kong government position

Hong Kong Special Administrative Region Secretary for the Treasury 庫務局局長
- Treasury Bureau
- Style: The Honourable
- Appointer: Central People's Government nomination by Chief Executive
- Inaugural holder: Hamish Macleod
- Formation: 1989
- Final holder: Denis Yue
- Abolished: 30 June 2002
- Succession: Secretary for Financial Services and the Treasury

Secretary for the Treasury
- Traditional Chinese: 庫務局局長
Transcriptions
Yue: Cantonese
- Yale Romanization: Fu mouh guhk guhk jéung
- Jyutping: Fu^{3} mou^{6} guk^{6} guk^{6} zoeng^{2}

The Secretary for the Treasury (Chinese: 庫務局局長, formerly 庫務司) was a minister in the Government of Hong Kong between 1989 and 2002, responsible for maintaining the assets of the government. The position was replaced by Secretary for Financial Services and the Treasury in 2002 after merging the position with the portfolio of financial services.

The treasury affairs were handled by the Deputy Financial Secretary before 1989.

== List of office holders ==
Political party: Nonpartisan Democratic Alliance for the Betterment and Progress of Hong Kong (DAB)

=== Secretaries for the Treasury, 1989–1997 ===
No.	Portrait	Name	Term of office		Governor	Ref
1		Sir Hamish Macleod 麥高樂	1 April 1989	1 April 1991	Sir David Wilson (1987–1992)	
2		Yeung Kai-yin 楊啟彥	2 May 1991	6 May 1993	Sir David Wilson (1987–1992)	
2		Yeung Kai-yin 楊啟彥	2 May 1991	6 May 1993	Chris Patten (1992–1997)	
3		Sir Donald Tsang 曾蔭權	7 May 1993	31 March 1995	Chris Patten (1992–1997)	
4		Kwong Ki-chi 鄺其志	1 April 1995	30 June 1997	Chris Patten (1992–1997)	

=== Secretaries for the Treasury, 1997–2002 ===
No.	Portrait	Name	Term of office		Duration	Chief Executive	Term	Ref
1		Kwong Ki-chi 鄺其志	1 July 1997	31 March 1998	273 days	Tung Chee-hwa (1997–2005)	1	
2		Denise Yue Chung-yee 俞宗怡	1 April 1998	30 June 2002	4 years, 90 days	Tung Chee-hwa (1997–2005)	1	
