= Haider Barma =

Hong Kong politician

- Traditional Chinese: 鮑文
- Simplified Chinese: 鲍文
Transcriptions
Standard Mandarin
- Hanyu Pinyin: Bào Wén
Yue: Cantonese
- Jyutping: baau1 man4

Haider Hatim Tyebjee Barma GBS, ISO, JP (born 1944) served as Hong Kong's Secretary for Transport from 1993 until 1996.

He was born as a third generation Hong Konger, educated in British Hong Kong, and is of Indian ancestry. He speaks Cantonese at a fluent level. He had Hong Kong nationality and as of 1996 never acquired any other. Agence France-Presse (AFP) stated he had the nationality of Pakistan.

He received a BA with honours from the University of Hong Kong, a CBA from the London School of Economics, and an M. Phil from the University of Oxford.

== Career ==
He started as an executive officer in the Hong Kong Civil Service in March 1966. In August that year his rank increased to administrative officer. He was appointed Deputy Secretary for the Civil Service in 1968. In 1988 he became the Director of Regional Services, and in 1991 he became Director of Urban Services.

He took his transport secretary post in 1993, replacing Yeung Kai-yin. This made him the person in the Hong Kong civil service in the highest rank who was not ethnic Chinese nor of origins from Western countries. AFP stated that he was "popular" in that role.

On 9 January 1996 he resigned from his position because, due to the Handover of Hong Kong, the government would not allow non-ethnic Chinese to retain high government posts as per the Hong Kong Basic Law. Barma stated "One has got to be pragmatic. I am not Chinese, and one has to accept the reality of historical developments." Himal Southasian stated that his resignation signaled to Indians in Hong Kong that their future in the territory may be tenuous.

== Post-career ==
He took another position not reserved for ethnic Chinese, as the Public Service Commission (PSC) chairperson. He took the PSC position effective 1 August 1996. He left the PSC position in April 2005.

He stated that after the handover he planned to remain in Hong Kong.

He was appointed as a non-official justice of the peace on 13 June 1997.

Political offices
Preceded by Yeung Kai-yin	Secretary for Transport; 1993-1996	Succeeded by Gordon Siu
