= Hamish Macleod =

British politician (born 1940)

Sir Hamish Macleod KBE JP

Secretary for the Treasury
- In office 1989–1991
- Monarch: Elizabeth II
- Governor: Sir David Wilson
- Succeeded by: Yeung Kai-yin

Financial Secretary of Hong Kong
- In office August 1991 – August 1995
- Monarch: Elizabeth II
- Governor: Sir David Wilson; Chris Patten
- Preceded by: Piers Jacobs
- Succeeded by: Donald Tsang

Personal details
- Born: 1940 (age 85–86) Midlothian, Scotland

Sir Nathaniel William Hamish Macleod KBE JP (Chinese: 麥高樂; born 1940) is a Scottish civil servant who was the last Financial Secretary of Hong Kong with British descent.

== Early life ==
In 1940, Macleod was born in Midlothian, Scotland.

== Career ==
Macleod was Financial Secretary of Hong Kong from 1991 to 1995. Macleod also was the Secretary for Trade and Industry of Hong Kong from 1987 to 1989 and the Secretary for the Treasury of Hong Kong from 1989 to 1991.

In 1991, Macleod was appointed as Financial Secretary of Hong Kong. Macleod succeeded Piers Jacobs. In August 1995, at age 55, MacLeod retired as Financial Secretary of Hong Kong.

In 2003, Macleod was director and Chairman of JPMorgan Asian Investment Trust PLC.

== Personal life ==
In 1997, Macleod returned to the United Kingdom after the Hong Kong handover.

Political offices
Preceded by Eric Ho	Secretary for Trade and Industry; 1987 – 1989	Succeeded by John Chan
Preceded by John Francis Yaxley	Deputy Financial Secretary; March 1989	Succeeded by Himself as Secretary for the Treasury
Preceded by Himself as Deputy Financial Secretary	Secretary for the Treasury; 1989 – 1991	Succeeded by Yeung Kai-yin
Preceded by Sir Piers Jacobs	Financial Secretary of Hong Kong; 1991 – 1995	Succeeded by Donald Tsang
