= Kwong Ki-chi =

Hong Kong government official

Kwong Ki-chi, GBS (K.C. Kwong; simplified Chinese: 邝其志; traditional Chinese: 鄺其志; pinyin: Kuàng Qízhì) was a Hong Kong government official. He was the Deputy Secretary for the Treasury, the Secretary for the Treasury, and the Secretary for Information Technology and Broadcasting. He later served as the Chief Executive of the Hong Kong Exchanges and Clearing Limited, and authored a report on the rise of Chinese Enterprises to global eminence.

Political offices
Preceded by Donald Tsang	Secretary for the Treasury; 1995–1998	Succeeded by Denise Yue
Preceded by Brian Chau as Secretary for Broadcasting, Culture and Sport	Secretary for Information Technology and Broadcasting; 1998–2000	Succeeded by Carrie Yau
Order of precedence
Preceded by Daniel Tse; Recipients of the Gold Bauhinia Star	Hong Kong order of precedence Recipients of the Gold Bauhinia Star	Succeeded by Nellie Fong; Recipients of the Gold Bauhinia Star
