= Deputy Financial Secretary =

Deputy Financial Secretary of the Hong Kong Special Administrative Region
- 香港特別行政區財政司副司長
- Emblem of Hong Kong

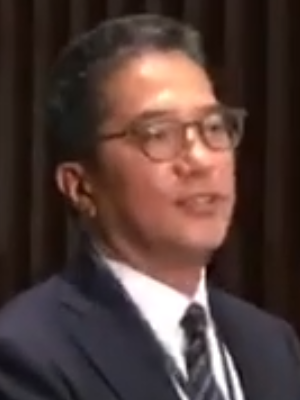
- Incumbent; Michael Wong since 1 July 2022
- Style: The Honourable (尊貴的)
- Member of: Government Secretariat; Executive Council
- Reports to: Legislative Council
- Nominator: Chief Executive
- Appointer: State Council of the People's Republic of China
- Term length: No longer than the Chief Executive's remaining term
- Constituting instrument: Hong Kong Basic Law
- Inaugural holder: Michael Wong
- Formation: 1 July 2022; 4 years ago
- Salary: around HK$4,360,000 annually
- Website: FSO

Deputy Financial Secretary is a ministerial position in the Government of Hong Kong, deputising the Financial Secretary. The position was created in 2022 after John Lee took office as Chief Executive.

== History ==
Deputy Financial Secretary was created by 1945 during the British colonial rule. The position was renamed to Secretary for the Treasury in 1989.

In 2022, John Lee, after being selected as the new Chief Executive, decided to install the position of Deputy Financial Secretary. The position was officially revived on 1 July 2022 after his cabinet took office.

== Role ==
The Deputy Financial Secretary's primary responsibility is to assist the Financial Secretary in coordinating formulation and implementation of cross-bureaux/departmental policies and supervising the policy bureaux under his charge. The Deputy Financial Secretary also assists the Chief Executive in policy making as a member of the Executive Council and takes charge of specific policy areas or projects as directed by the Chief Executive and the Financial Secretary.

== List ==
=== Deputy Financial Secretaries, 1945–1989 ===
| No. | Portrait | Name | Term of office | | Governor | Ref |
|---|---|---|---|---|---|---|
| 1 | | Arthur Grenfell Clarke 岐樂嘉 | 1945 | 1951 | Sir Mark Aitchison Young | |
| 1 | | Arthur Grenfell Clarke 岐樂嘉 | 1945 | 1951 | Sir Alexander Grantham | |
| 2 | | John James Cowperthwaite 郭伯偉 | 1952 | 17 January 1960 | Sir Alexander Grantham | |
| 2 | | John James Cowperthwaite 郭伯偉 | 1952 | 17 January 1960 | Sir Robert Brown Black | |
| 3 | | Michael Denys Arthur Clinton | 18 January 1960 | 5 January 1969 | Sir Robert Brown Black | |
| 3 | | Michael Denys Arthur Clinton | 18 January 1960 | 5 January 1969 | Sir David Trench | |
| 4 | | Charles Philip Haddon-Cave 夏鼎基 | 6 January 1969 | 1971 | Sir David Trench | |
| 5 | | David Jeaffreson 謝法新 | 1972 | 1976 | Sir Murray MacLehose | |
| 6 | | Henry Ching 程慶禮 | 1976 | 1984 | Sir Murray MacLehose | |
| 6 | | Henry Ching 程慶禮 | 1976 | 1984 | Sir Edward Youde | |
| 7 | | Selwyn Eugene Alleyne 程尚文 | 1984 | 15 March 1987 | Sir Edward Youde | |
| 7 | | Selwyn Eugene Alleyne 程尚文 | 1984 | 15 March 1987 | Sir David Wilson | |
| 8 | | John Francis Yaxley 易誠禮 | 16 March 1987 | 1989 | Sir David Wilson | |
| 9 | | Hamish Macleod 麥高樂 | 1 March 1989 | 31 March 1989 | Sir David Wilson | |

=== Deputy Financial Secretaries, 2022– ===
| No. | Portrait | Name | Term of office | | Chief Executive | Ref |
|---|---|---|---|---|---|---|
| 1 | | Michael Wong Wai-lun 黃偉綸 | 1 July 2022 | Incumbent | John Lee (I) | |
