= Chau Tak-hay =

Hong Kong government official

Brian Chau Tak-hay, GBS CBE (Chinese: 周德熙; born 26 January 1943) is a former Hong Kong government official. He has served in many positions regarding to trade, including the Secretary for Trade and Industry from 1991 to 1995 and from 1998 to 2002 and Secretary for Broadcasting, Culture and Sport from 1995 to 1998. Since 2002, he has been Special Consultant to the Ministry of Commerce of the People's Republic of China.

== Education and government career ==
Chau was born in 1943 in Hong Kong. He was graduated from the St. Joseph's College, Hong Kong in 1961 and the University of Hong Kong in 1967 and joined the Hong Kong government on the same year.

During his early career, Chau was involved in the formulation of Hong Kong's foreign trade policies, establishing and negotiating the bilateral textiles arrangements between Hong Kong and importing countries under the Multi-Fibre Arrangement (MFA), at the time when Hong Kong textiles industry was booming. In 1979, Chau was appointed as Hong Kong's permanent representative to the General Agreement on Tariffs and Trade (GATT) and served until 1984.

After he returned to Hong Kong in 1984, he continued to serve in many positions, including Regional Secretary for Hong Kong and Kowloon in the City and New Territories Administration and Secretary for Health and Welfare from 1988 to 1989. In that capacity, he was also an official member of the Legislative Council of Hong Kong. In 1990, his position dropped as the Director-General of Trade, where he responded with "a step back after a year a boundless as the sea and sky".

After a year, he was re-promoted to Secretary for Trade and Industry from 1991 and 1995 and Secretary for Broadcasting, Culture and Sport from November 1995 to March 1998. In 1990, he famously commented on Singapore by noting that Singapore had "advantages" over Hong Kong's in implementing unpopular policies to tackle the economic downturn (such as wage cuts) because the People's Action Party has nearly complete control over parliament, the media, trade unions and the people. He further added: "Of course we are different from Singapore. The opposition parties in Singapore do not raise opposition. If they do raise opposition, the might be arrested...our legislative council has 60 opposition members." The Straits Times replied with a bitter editorial that denounced Chau's "misinformed and inaccurate comments."

He was appointed again as Secretary for Trade and Industry in March 1998 in which the position was renamed Secretary for Commerce and Industry in July 2000. He retired from the government in 2002 after he was not invited to be principal official under the new Principal Officials Accountability System of the Tung Chee-hwa administration. Upon his retirement, he was awarded Gold Bauhinia Star (GBS).

== Retirement and personal life ==
After his retirement, He held many company directorships, including the Wheelock and Company Ltd., SJM Holdings Limited, Tradelink Electronic Commerce Limited and China Life Insurance Co. Ltd.

He married Ada Wong Ying-kay, former chairman of the Wan Chai District Council.

Government offices
Preceded by John Walter Chambers	Secretary for Health and Welfare; 1988–1989	Succeeded by Elizabeth Wong
Preceded by John Chan	Secretary for Trade and Industry; 1990–1995	Succeeded by Denise Yue
New title	Secretary for Broadcasting, Culture and Sport; 1996–1998	Succeeded by Kwong Ki-chi as Secretary for Information Technology and Broadcasting
Preceded by Denise Yue	Secretary for Trade and Industry; 1998–2000	Succeeded by Himself as Secretary for Commerce and Industry
Preceded by Himself as Secretary for Trade and Industry	Secretary for Commerce and Industry; 1998–2002	Succeeded by Henry Tang as Secretary for Commerce, Industry and Technology
