= Writers' assistant =

Role in the television industry

Writers' assistant is a junior role in the television industry, providing clerical support and record keeping for writers' room meetings and basic office support for writing teams.

== Job description ==
The term "writer's assistant" is somewhat of a misnomer; the person in this position assists the "writing process" more than anything else. Their major job is attending all writer meeting and taking notes making a careful record of what was said, particularly something on the white board or said by the showrunner. After taking notes at the room meetings, the assistant organizes this information, and sends out a 15-20 page email to the writers to provide them with material for their deadlines. Other duties include doing research, pitching ideas, producing web content, read and type scripts, and print and add revisions to scripts. Mundane duties during non-meeting days can include setting schedules, getting coffee, managing email and taking calls. There are generally 6-12 writers for a show, but only one writers' assistant. Necessary skills for this job include multi-tasking, managing time, fast typing speed (or shorthand), and good written communication.

== Career objectives ==
The job entails long hours, low pay and very poor job security, but it is one of the most coveted jobs in the industry. It is described as "the best non-writing job in Hollywood." This position gives the assistant valuable connections in the industry, learning the inside of the business, and a view into the heart of TV writing. It is felt that this is the most direct route to becoming a script writer and then ascending the classist pecking order of the writers' room. Conditions improved after a 2021 union negotiated contract increased minimum wages from $16/hour to $26/hour over three years. The need for a living wage was at the center of the dispute with the studios. In the fight over the contract, writers were very supportive of their assistants, acknowledging their importance. Job security, however, remains a persistent problem.

== Notable former writers' assistants ==
- Robin Veith
- Naomi Ekperigin
- Gordon Smith
- Cherry Chevapravatdumrong
- Elisabeth R. Finch
- Tracey Wigfield
- Chloe Domont
- Nick Cheuk
