= Joseph Wong =

Hong Kong politician (born 1948)

Joseph Wong Wing-ping GBS, JP
- 王永平
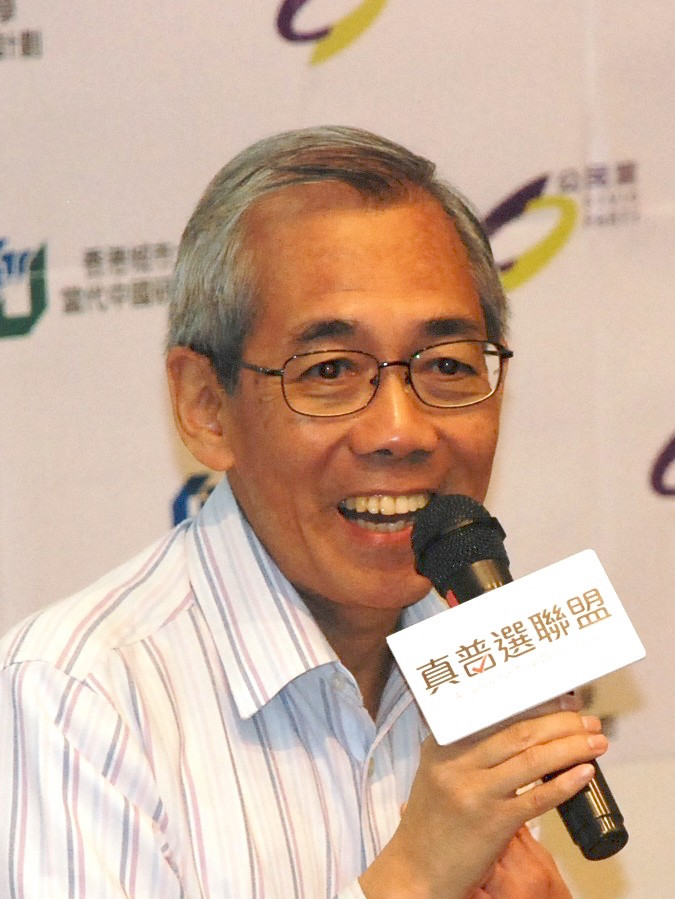

Secretary for Commerce, Industry and Technology
- In office 24 January 2006 – 30 June 2007
- Preceded by: John Tsang

Secretary for the Civil Service
- In office 1 August 2000 – 24 January 2006
- Preceded by: Lam Woon-kwong
- Succeeded by: Denise Yue

Personal details
- Born: July 25, 1948 (age 78) British Hong Kong
- Education: The University of Hong Kong; University of Oxford
- Occupation: Professor at the City University of Hong Kong

Joseph Wong Wing-ping GBS, JP (Cantonese : 王永平; born 25 July 1948) was the Secretary for Education Department, Secretary for Commerce, Industry and Technology and the Secretary for the Civil Service in Hong Kong.

Wong completed his secondary school education at Wah Yan College, Hong Kong, an eminent all-male Roman Catholic Jesuit school in Hong Kong. He graduated from the University of Hong Kong in 1969. He also attended a one-year postgraduate course at the University of Oxford in 1974 and an eight-week Executive Program at Stanford University in 1989.

Wong is a career civil servant and was previously Hong Kong's permanent representative to the General Agreement on Tariffs and Trade (GATT) and the World Trade Organization (WTO). He has also been a professor at the University of Hong Kong and the Chinese University of Hong Kong.

He continues to provide public commentary through opinion pieces in local media, such as South China Morning Post, Hong Kong Economic Journal and EJ Insight.

Political offices
Preceded by Leung Man-kin	Secretary for Education and Manpower; 1995 – 2000	Succeeded by Fanny Law
Preceded by Lam Woon-kwong	Secretary for the Civil Service; 2000 – 2006	Succeeded by Denise Yue
Preceded by John Tsang	Secretary for Commerce, Industry and Technology; 2006 – 2007	Succeeded by Frederick Ma as Secretary for Commerce and Economic Development
Order of precedence
Preceded by Wong Kin-pan; District Council Chairmen	Hong Kong order of precedence Recipients of the Gold Bauhinia Star	Succeeded by John Estmond Strickland; Recipients of the Gold Bauhinia Star
