= Cheuk Wing-hing =

Hong Kong politician (born 1959)

The Honourable Cheuk Wing-hing GBS JP
- 卓永興
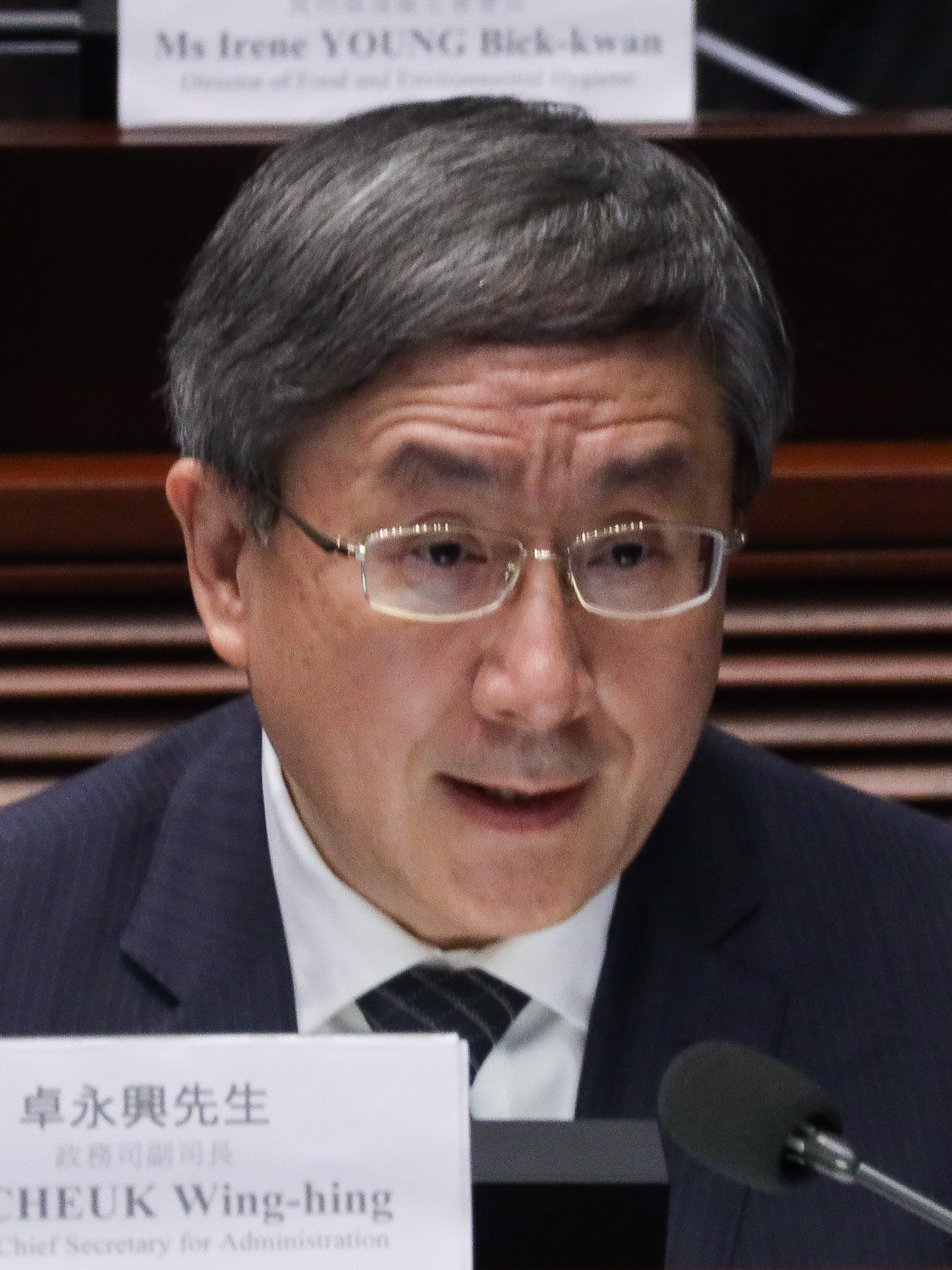
- Cheuk in 2023

Deputy Chief Secretary for Administration
- Incumbent
- Assumed office 1 July 2022
- Chief Executive: John Lee
- Preceded by: Office established

Permanent Secretary for Innovation and Technology
- In office 20 November 2015 – 12 April 2019
- Succeeded by: Annie Choi

Commissioner of Labour
- In office 29 November 2010 – 18 February 2014
- Preceded by: Cherry Tse
- Succeeded by: Donald Tong

Personal details
- Born: Cheuk Wing-hing; March 24, 1959 (age 67) British Hong Kong
- Spouse: Chu Kwan Ying
- Children: Nick Cheuk Yick-him
- Education: Bachelor of Arts
- Alma mater: Raimondi College; University of Hong Kong
- Occupation: Administrative Officer, Inspector of Police

Warner Cheuk Wing-hing GBS JP(Chinese: 卓永興 , born March 24, 1959) is a Hong Kong administrative officer, former Inspector of Police, currently Deputy Chief Secretary for Administration, and former Permanent Secretary of the Innovation and Technology.

== Career ==
Cheuk was born and raised in Hong Kong, with ancestral roots in Zhongshan City, Guangdong Province; he attended Raimondi College in his early years. He graduated from the University of Hong Kong in 1981 with a Bachelor of Arts degree, and joined the Police Force as a Inspector of Police in June of the same year. In August 1984, he was transferred to the administrative grade, and in April 2007, he was promoted to the Administrative Officer Staff Grade B1 (D4), and in April 2017, he was promoted to the Administrative Officer Staff Grade A1 (D8).

He has served in various bureaus and departments, including the former two Bureaus and Administration Branch, the former Administration and Information Branch, the former City and New Territories Administration, the Post Office, the former Finance Branch, the former Financial Services Branch, the Department of Health, Civil Service Bureau, the former Industry Department, InvestHK, Food and Environmental Hygiene Department,the General Grades Office, former Health, Welfare and Food Bureau, Labour Department and the former Innovation and Technology Bureau.

Important positions held by Cheuk include:

- 2001: Assistant Director of Food and Environmental Hygiene (Headquarters)
- June 2001 to December 2003: Deputy Director (Environmental Hygiene), Food and Environmental Hygiene Department
- December 2003 to June 2006: Director of General Grades, Civil Service Bureau
- August 2006 to December 2007: Deputy Secretary for Health, Welfare and Food Bureau (food and environmental hygiene) (hereinafter referred to as Deputy Secretary for Food and Health (Food))
- December 2007 to November 2010: Director of Food and Environmental Hygiene
- November 2010 to February 18, 2014: Commissioner for Labour
- February 19, 2014, to the end of March 2014: Chairman of Administrative Officer Recruitment Board 2014
- May 2, 2014 to November 2015: Director of Administration and Development, Department of Justice
- November 20, 2015 to April 12, 2019: Permanent Secretary for Innovation and Technology
- September 16, 2019 to March 15, 2020: Director of Dialogue Office, Policy Innovation and Co-ordination Office
- July 1, 2022 to present: Deputy Chief Secretary for Administration.

== Deputy Chief Secretary for Administration ==
After retirement from the civil service, Cheuk was still active in the public service, such as becoming the Chairman of the 2019 Administrative Officer Recruitment Board, Director of the COVID-19 Vaccination Programme and Adviser of the Financial Secretary's Private Office.

In July 2022, he was appointed the Deputy Secretary for Administration of the HKSAR Government. According to the nomination of John Lee, the sixth chief executive of the Hong Kong Special Administrative Region, on June 19, 2022, the State Council appointed Cheuk as the deputy chief secretary for administration of the Hong Kong Government.

In December 2022, Cheuk said that Hong Kong will stop buying advertising space from Google if a song linked to the 2019 anti-government protests remained as one of the top search results for the national anthem.

In January 2024, Cheuk said that Hong Kong would install 2,000 more CCTV cameras in the city, and that it was only a "relatively small" amount of cameras.

== Personal life ==
In August 2022, Cheuk tested positive for COVID-19. In September 2022, he tested positive again.
