= Piers Jacobs =

Financial Secretary of Hong Kong from 1986 to 1991

Sir Piers Jacobs KBE JP

Financial Secretary of Hong Kong
- In office 1986–1991
- Monarch: Elizabeth II
- Governor: Sir Edward Youde; Sir David Wilson
- Succeeded by: Hamish Macleod

Secretary for Economic Services
- In office 1982–1986
- Monarch: Elizabeth II
- Governor: Sir Murray MacLehose; Sir Edward Youde

Personal details
- Born: 27 May 1933 United Kingdom
- Died: 23 September 1999 (aged 66) Hong Kong

Piers Jacobs
- Traditional Chinese: 翟克誠
Transcriptions
Yue: Cantonese
- Yale Romanization: Jaahk Hāk Sìhng
- Jyutping: Zaak^{6} Hak^{1} Sing^{4}

Sir Piers Jacobs KBE JP (Chinese: 翟克誠; 27 May 1933 – 23 September 1999) was Financial Secretary of Hong Kong from 1986 to 1991, a period that included the 1987 market crash, when he oversaw the closure of the stock exchange and notably refused to bail out the Bank of Credit and Commerce International. He also was Secretary for Economic Services from 1982 to 1986.

A solicitor by profession, Jacobs held a number of senior corporate positions, including in later life: senior vice-chairman and director of CLP Holdings, chairman and director of Sir Elly Kadoorie and Sons, and chairman of the Kadoorie Farm and Botanic Garden Corporation.

== Personal life, and death ==
Born in the United Kingdom, Jacobs was married with one daughter. He died in Hong Kong on 23 September 1999, survived by his wife and daughter.

| Preceded by David Gregory Jeaffreson | Secretary for Economic Services; 1982–1986 | Succeeded by Anson Chan |
| Preceded by Sir John Henry Bremridge | Financial Secretary of Hong Kong; 1986–1991 | Succeeded by Sir Nathaniel William Hamish Macleod |
