= Deputy Chief Secretary for Administration =

Deputy Chief Secretary for Administration of the Hong Kong Special Administrative Region
- 香港特別行政區政務司副司長
- Emblem of Hong Kong
- Incumbent; Warner Cheuk since 1 July 2022
- Style: The Honourable (尊貴的)
- Member of: Government Secretariat; Executive Council
- Reports to: Legislative Council
- Nominator: Chief Executive
- Appointer: State Council of the People's Republic of China
- Term length: No longer than the Chief Executive's remaining term
- Constituting instrument: Hong Kong Basic Law
- Inaugural holder: Warner Cheuk
- Formation: 1 July 2022; 4 years ago
- Salary: around HK$4,360,000 annually
- Website: CSO

Deputy Chief Secretary for Administration is a ministerial position in the Government of Hong Kong, deputising the Chief Secretary for Administration, the second-highest position in Hong Kong. The position was created in 2022 after John Lee took office as Chief Executive.

== History ==
Deputy Chief Secretary was created in 1985 during the British colonial rule, responsible for elections and political systems, along with co-ordination of affairs involving more than two departments. The position was renamed to Secretary for Constitutional Affairs in 1989.

In October 2020, Carrie Lam, then Chief Executive, proposed the reconstruction of governmental departments during her last policy address, which also mulled creating the position of Deputy Chief Secretary for Administration to handle issues related to large-scale infrastructures. The recommendation was adopted by her successor, John Lee, and was installed on 1 July 2022 after his cabinet took office.

== Role ==
The Deputy Chief Secretary for Administration is responsible for assisting the Chief Secretary for Administration in supervising the departments as well as coordinating the formulation and implementation of policies that cut across various departments. He also plans, co-ordinates or takes charge of specific policy areas or projects as directed by the Chief Executive and/or the Chief Secretary for Administration.

== List ==
=== Deputy Chief Secretaries, 1985–1989 ===
No.	Portrait	Name	Term of office		Governor	Ref
1		Alan James Scott 施恪	10 June 1985	22 March 1987	Sir Edward Youde	
1		Alan James Scott 施恪	10 June 1985	22 March 1987	Sir David Wilson	
2		John Chan 陳祖澤	23 March 1987	28 February 1989	Sir David Wilson	

=== Deputy Chief Secretaries for Administration, 2022–present ===
No.	Portrait	Name	Term of office		Chief Executive	Ref
1		Warner Cheuk Wing-hing 卓永興	1 July 2022	Incumbent	John Lee (I)	
