= Ronald James Blake =

Hong Kong government official (born 1934)

Ronald James Blake, GBS, OBE, JP (Chinese: 詹伯樂, born 2 April 1934) is a civil engineer, and a former Secretary for Works in the government of British Hong Kong. He was appointed to the post of acting CEO of Kowloon-Canton Railway Corporation (KCRC) on 16 March 2006 to replace the outgoing Samuel Lai.

== Early life ==
James Blake was born in the UK in 1934. He studied structural engineering part-time whilst working as a draftsman for an engineering firm after leaving school.

== Career ==
While serving with the Royal Engineers in Her Majesty's Armed Forces he arrived in the Territory for the first time in 1958. He qualified as a Chartered Engineer two years later. He settled in Hong Kong in 1965 and worked in various private companies, participating in the construction of the Cross-Harbour Tunnel as well as the MTR amongst other projects. Prior to coming to the Territory, he had worked for Boulton and Paul in the UK. He had also worked for Scott Wilson Kirkpatrick & Partners in Hong Kong, before being appointed as Secretary for Works. "HKEX". Archived from the original (PDF) on 3 March 2016.

== Secretary for Works ==
He was appointed Secretary for Works by the Hong Kong Government in 1991, a post he held until 1995. He later joined the KCRC as its Senior Director of capital projects.

== Professional achievements ==
- Awarded gold medal by the Institute of Civil Engineers in 1997
- President of the Hong Kong Institution of Engineers from 1991 to 1992
- Awarded the Gold Bauhinia Star, 2012

Order of precedence
| Preceded by Felice Lieh-mak; Recipients of the Gold Bauhinia Star | Hong Kong order of precedence Recipients of the Gold Bauhinia Star | Succeeded by Justices of Peace |
