= Michael Leung =

Hong Kong government official (1938–2017)

Commissioner of the ICAC
- In office 1996–1997
- Governor: Chris Patten
- Preceded by: Bertrand de Speville
- Succeeded by: Lily Yam

Secretary for Education and Manpower
- In office 1993–1995
- Preceded by: John Chan
- Succeeded by: Joseph Wong

Personal details
- Born: 1938
- Died: 2017 (aged 78–79)
- Education: University of Hong Kong
- Profession: Civil servant

Michael Leung
- Chinese: 梁文建
Transcriptions
Standard Mandarin
- Hanyu Pinyin: Liáng Wénjiàn
Yue: Cantonese
- Jyutping: loeng4 man4 gin3

Michael Leung Man-kin CBE JP (Chinese: 梁文建, 1938–2017) was a Hong Kong government official.

== Early life ==
Leung was born in 1938. He attended Wah Yan College and studied at the University of Hong Kong, graduating with a BA in history in 1965. He also held a teaching certification.

== Government career ==
Leung joined the civil service in 1965. He worked in the Home Affairs Department and Finance Branch, and was promoted to Secretary, Government Secretariat in 1988.

Leung served as the director of education and the secretary for transport in the Hong Kong government. He also served as secretary for education and manpower from 1993 to 1995, and as the Commissioner of the Independent Commission Against Corruption (ICAC) from 1996 to 1997.

In December 1996, as the Handover of Hong Kong approached, Leung announced that he would quit the ICAC, fuelling speculation that he was being forced out by chief executive-designate Tung Chee-hwa. In response, Leung stated that he was leaving for personal reasons, while Tung denied any involvement in Leung's departure.
