= John Estmond Strickland =

John Estmond Strickland is a Hong Kong–based businessman and philanthropist. He was the former chairman of the Hongkong and Shanghai Banking Corporation Ltd. (1996–1998) with responsibility for HSBC's operations in Asia Pacific. He joined HSBC in Hong Kong in 1970, and was in charge of IT development and strategy, globally, and helped develop HSBC's core banking systems.

He has honorary fellowships with the University of Hong Kong, the Hong Kong Computer Society, the Hong Kong Institute of Bankers and the Hong Kong Management Association as well as honorary doctorates from City University of Hong Kong and Hong Kong Polytechnic University.

== Education ==
He graduated from Jesus College, Cambridge with a degree of Master of Arts in physics.

== Career ==
- Chairman of the Board, Hong Kong Internet Registration Corporation
- Member of the Airport Authority Board and Antiquities Advisory Board
- Independent Non-executive Director of Hong Kong Exchanges and Clearing Limited since March 31, 2004
- President of the Outward Bound Trust of Hong Kong.
- HSBC Group's IT (1971 to 1995)
- Chairman of Hong Kong Cyberport Management Co. Ltd.
- Director of Airport Authority Hong Kong since June 1999
- Independent Non-executive Director of Integrated Distribution Services Group Ltd., since 21 October 2004.
- Director of Esquel Holdings Inc.
- Director, Yoma Strategic Investments Ltd.

== Affiliations ==
Strickland is the president of the Trust Officers of The Outward Bound Hong Kong, and member or board member of such organizations as the Community Chest, the Boys' and Girls' Clubs Association of Hong Kong, the Hong Kong Youth Hostel Association, the Salvation Army Advisory Board, the Antiquities Advisory Board, Hong Kong Adventure Corps, the Independent Schools Foundation, the China Exploration and Research Society and the Asia Society.

== Honorary fellowships/doctorates ==
- Honorary Fellowship, University of Hong Kong
- Honorary Fellowship, Hong Kong Computer Society
- Honorary Fellowship, Hong Kong Institute of Bankers
- Honorary Fellowship, Hong Kong Management Association
- Honorary Doctorate, City University of Hong Kong
- Honorary Doctorate, Hong Kong Polytechnic University

Order of precedence
Preceded by Joseph Wong; Recipients of the Gold Bauhinia Star	Hong Kong order of precedence Recipients of the Gold Bauhinia Star	Succeeded by Raymond Chow; Recipients of the Gold Bauhinia Star
