= JPMorgan Asia Growth & Income =

British investment trust dedicated to investments in Asia excluding Japan

- Type: Public company
- Traded as: LSE: JAGI
- ISIN: GB0001320778
- Industry: Investment trust
- Founded: 1997; 29 years ago
- Headquarters: 25 Bank Street, Canary Wharf, London, England
- Key people: Richard Stagg (chair)

JPMorgan Asia Growth & Income (LSE: JAGI) is a large British investment trust dedicated to investments in Asia excluding Japan. The company is listed on the London Stock Exchange. The Chairman is Richard Stagg.

== History ==
The company was established by Robert Fleming & Co. as the Fleming Asian Investment Trust in 1997. After Robert Fleming & Co. was acquired by Chase Manhattan in April 2000, and Chase Manhattan merged with J.P. Morgan & Co. in December 2000, it was brought under the management of J.P. Morgan & Co. It went on to be the JPMorgan Fleming Asian Investment Trust in February 2002 and the JPMorgan Asian Investment Trust in February 2006. It adopted its current name in February 2020.
