= Donald Tsang =

Chief Executive of Hong Kong from 2005 to 2012

The Honourable Sir Donald Tsang GBM KBE
- 曾蔭權
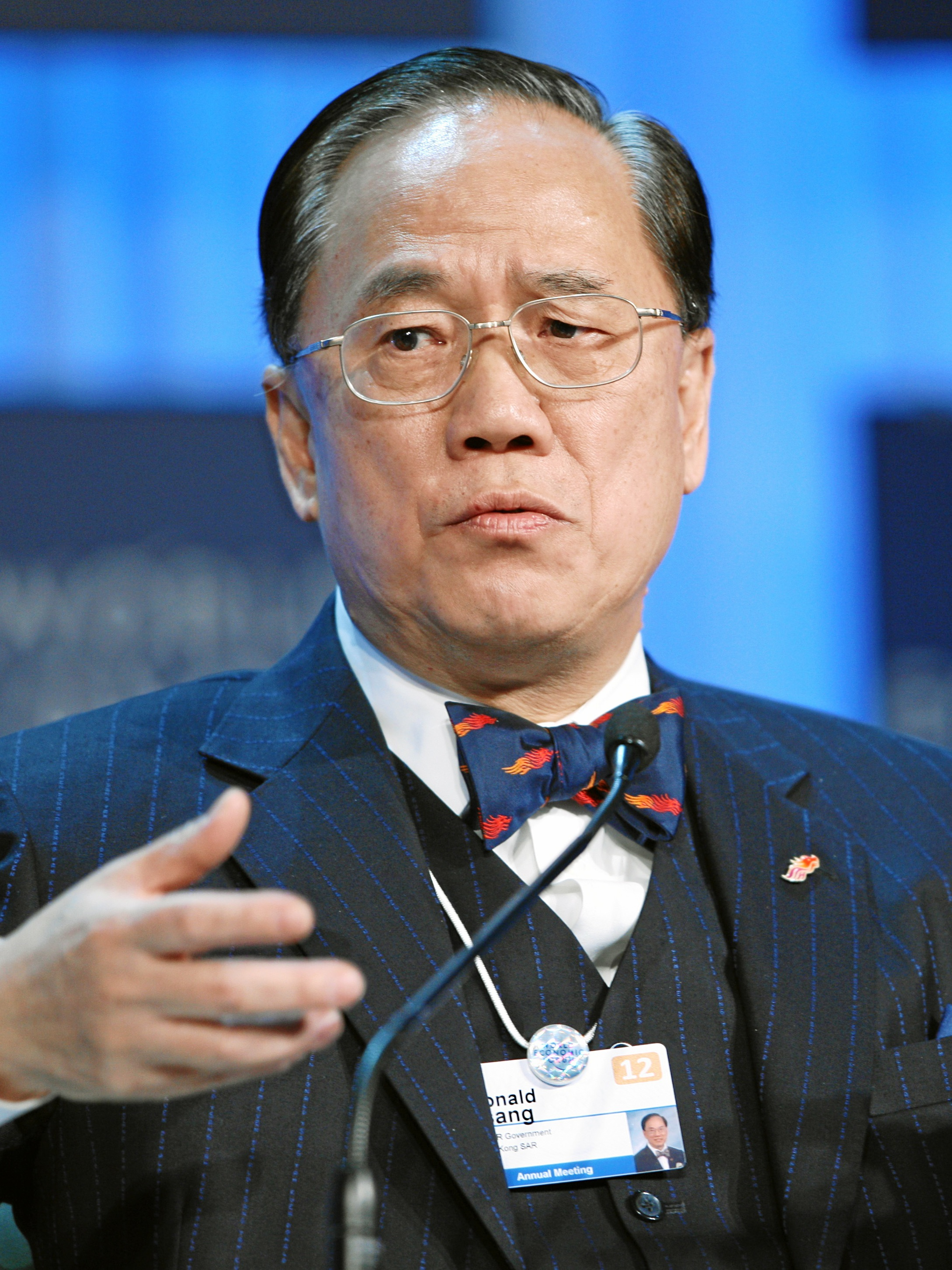
- Tsang in 2012

2nd Chief Executive of Hong Kong
- In office 21 June 2005 (Note: Tsang became Acting Chief Executive on 12 March 2005 following Tung's resignation. Tsang stepped down from this role on 25 May 2005 to run in the election to succeed Tung; Henry Tang became Acting Chief Executive until Tsang was appointed Chief Executive on 21 June 2005.) – 30 June 2012
- President: Hu Jintao
- Premier: Wen Jiabao
- Preceded by: Tung Chee-hwa
- Succeeded by: Leung Chun-ying

Chief Secretary for Administration
- In office 1 May 2001 – 31 May 2005
- Chief Executive: Tung Chee-hwa
- Preceded by: Anson Chan
- Succeeded by: Rafael Hui

Financial Secretary of Hong Kong
- In office 1 July 1997 – 30 April 2001
- Chief Executive: Tung Chee-hwa
- Succeeded by: Anthony Leung
- In office 1 September 1995 – 30 June 1997
- Governor: Chris Patten
- Preceded by: Hamish Macleod

Secretary for the Treasury
- In office 7 May 1993 – 31 March 1995
- Governor: Chris Patten
- Preceded by: Yeung Kai-yin
- Succeeded by: Kwong Ki-chi

Personal details
- Born: Tsang Yam Kuen; 7 October 1944 (age 82) Hong Kong
- Party: Independent
- Spouse: Selina Pou Siu-mei (m. 1969)
- Children: 2
- Education: Wah Yan College
- Alma mater: Harvard University (MPA)
- Profession: Politician, Civil Servant
- Origin: Namhoi, Kwangtung

Donald Tsang Yam-kuen
- Traditional Chinese: 曾蔭權
- Simplified Chinese: 曾荫权
- Cantonese Yale: Jāng Yam-kyùhn or Jàng Yam-kyùhn
Transcriptions
Standard Mandarin
- Hanyu Pinyin: Zēng Yìnquán
- IPA: [tsə́ŋ întɕʰɥɛ̌n]
Hakka
- Romanization: Zen^{1} Yim^{4} Kien^{2}
Yue: Cantonese
- Yale Romanization: Jāng Yam-kyùhn or Jàng Yam-kyùhn
- Jyutping: Zang1 Jam3-kyun4
- IPA: [tsɐŋ˥ jɐm˧.kʰyn˩] or [tsɐ̂ŋ jɐ̄m.kʰy̏ːn]

Sir Donald Tsang Yam-kuen GBM KBE (Note: Donald Tsang was appointed a KBE in 1997 for the 30-year service to Hong Kong, and therefore entitled to use the title of "Sir". Tsang, however, chooses not to use the title in an official capacity. If the knighthood is used in the title, the individual shall be called (The Honourable) Sir Donald Tsang.) (Chinese: 曾蔭權; born 7 October 1944) is a former Hong Kong civil servant who served as the second Chief Executive of Hong Kong from 2005 to 2012.

Tsang joined the colonial civil service as an Executive Officer in 1967, occupying various positions in local administration, finance and trade before he was appointed Financial Secretary of Hong Kong in 1995, becoming the first ethnic Chinese to hold the position under British administration. He continued to serve in the Hong Kong SAR government after 1997 and gained his reputation internationally for his intervention in Hong Kong's stock market in defending the Hong Kong dollar's peg to the US dollar during the 1997 Asian financial crisis.

Tsang became the Chief Secretary for Administration in 2001 and ran for the Chief Executive office in 2005 after the incumbent Tung Chee-hwa resigned. He served the remaining term of Tung and was re-elected in 2007. He served a full five-year term until he stepped down in 2012. In his seven years of term, he proposed two constitutional reforms in 2005 and 2010 and saw the second ones passed after he reached a compromise with the pro-democracy legislators, making them the first and only political reform proposals to be passed in the SAR history. He carried out a five-year policy blueprint and ten large-scale infrastructure projects during his term. His popularity began to decline after the introduction of the Political Appointments System which was marked by controversies and scandals.

In the last months of his term, Tsang was embroiled in various corruption allegations. He was subsequently charged by the Independent Commission Against Corruption and found guilty of one count of misconduct in public office in February 2017 and was sentenced to 20 months imprisonment, becoming the highest officeholder in Hong Kong history to be convicted and imprisoned. His name was later cleared when the Court of Final Appeal unanimously quashed his conviction and sentence in June 2019, on the ground that the trial judge had misdirected the jury.

== Early life and government career ==
Tsang was born in Hong Kong on 7 October 1944 to a Hong Kong police officer. His family ancestry is from Foshan in Guangdong. He spent his childhood living in the Hollywood Road Police Married Quarters in Central, Hong Kong. After completing his secondary education at Wah Yan College, Hong Kong, a Jesuit school in Hong Kong, he worked briefly as a salesman at US drug company Pfizer Inc. before joining the civil service.

Tsang joined the Civil Service as an Executive Officer in January 1967 and held many positions dealing with local administration, finance, trade and policies relating to the return of Hong Kong to China. In 1977, Tsang was attached to the Asian Development Bank in Manila for a year and worked on water supply and railway development projects in the Philippines and Bangladesh. He was subsequently sent by the government to complete a master's degree in public administration from the John F. Kennedy School of Government of the Harvard University in 1981.

Tsang was responsible for implementing the Sino-British Joint Declaration, signed in 1984 to decide the Hong Kong's sovereignty to be transferred to China in 1997, and the promotion of the British Nationality Selection Scheme as Deputy Secretary of the General Duties Branch between 1985 and 1989. In 1989, he was appointed Director of Administration to oversee the functioning of the Government Secretariat. In 1991 he became Director-General of Trade and in charge of all facets of trade negotiation and administration affecting Hong Kong. In May 1993, he was promoted to Secretary for the Treasury, responsible for the overall resource allocation, the taxation systems and the cost effectiveness of the Hong Kong government.

== Financial Secretary ==
In September 1995, Tsang was appointed Financial Secretary, becoming the first Chinese to hold the position in 150 years of colonial history. He went on to become the first Financial Secretary in the Hong Kong Special Administrative Region on 1 July 1997. Shortly before the handover, he was knighted by Prince Charles at Government House in June 1997.

During his term as Financial Secretary, Tsang coined the term "caring capitalism" in 1996, which describe the governments's approach of giving priority to economic growth and then using the new-found wealth to develop social infrastructure and welfare services. Hong Kong's public spending grew steadily as public revenue remained robust and government budget in surplus. Public expenditure to GDP rose to as high as 23%, though still the lowest among developed economies. He also approved a raise in civil servants' salaries at the beginning of the 1997 Asian financial crisis. The salary raise was finally reversed, aligning civil servants' salaries to 1997 levels.

Tsang was known for his role in defending the Hong Kong dollar's peg to the US dollar during the 1997 Asian financial crisis in 1998 from attacks by hedge funds led by George Soros who he dubbed "crocodiles". He joined hand with Joseph Yam, Chief Executive of the Hong Kong Monetary Authority, and bought over $15 billion in Hong Kong stock to defend Hong Kong's exchange rate and to make the government the biggest shareholder in many blue chip firms. Tsang's action successfully led to the retreat of the hedge funds and earned his reputation internationally.

== Chief Secretary ==
In 2001, Tsang succeeded Anson Chan who retired citing personal reasons to be the Chief Secretary for Administration, the second-ranking position in the government. It was widely believed that Chan resigned from the government in protest against Chief Executive Tung Chee-hwa's introduction of the Principal Officials Accountability System, which altered the capacity of the Chief Secretary from civil servant to political appointee.

Under the new system, the power of the Chief Secretary as the head of the civil service was largely taken away by the Chief Executive and all ministers would only report to the Chief Executive directly. Donald Tsang found his major task as Chief Secretary was to implement Tung's order to launch a "Team Clean Campaign" to clean up the city in May 2003 after the SARS outbreak.

As he was generally regarded as being sidelined by Tung, Tsang was untainted by major policy blunders, such as the controversy over the legislation of the Hong Kong Basic Law Article 23 which led to a historic massive demonstration on 1 July 2003. He remained topping in popularity polls among all the officials in Hong Kong as Chief Secretary.

== Chief Executive bid ==
On 11 March 2005, incumbent Tung Chee-hwa announced his resignation, citing poor health. Tung's resignation was approved by the central government the next day and Tsang took over becoming the acting Chief Executive. After Tung's resignation, Tsang was tipped as Beijing's favoured next Chief Executive. On the afternoon of 25 May 2005, Tsang resigned as Chief Secretary and announced his Chief Executive candidacy on 2 June 2005 after his resignation was accepted by the central government. He was elected unopposed by the 800-member Election Committee on 16 June 2005 and was formally appointed by the central government as the Chief Executive on 21 June 2005. However, the term of the Chief Executive was disputed, which led to the interpretation of the Basic Law by the National People's Congress Standing Committee on 27 April to clarify that Tsang would only serve out the remaining two years of Tung Chee-hwa's term, rather than the full five years as some legal professionals argued.

== Chief Executive ==
=== First term (2005–07) ===
==== Economic policies ====
In 2006, Tsang proclaimed that "positive non-interventionism" was "past tense" for Hong Kong, which the role of the government was to "facilitate what the market does." Tsang's statement drew criticism locally and internationally, notably from economic philosopher Nobel Laureates Milton Friedman who had highly praised Hong Kong's free market economy, Edmund Phelps and an economist from the Chinese Academy of Social Sciences. Friedman published the article "Hong Kong wrong" on The Wall Street Journal in October 2006 shortly before he died, criticising Tsang for abandoning positive non-interventionism. The Heritage Foundation, a conservative Washington think tank, formally removed Hong Kong's designation as a bastion of economic freedom. Tsang later vowed his government's commitment to "small government".

==== 2007/08 constitutional reform ====
Tsang developed a warm relationship with the pan-democrats during the early months of his first term. Pan-democrat legislator Albert Chan gave his nomination to Tsang in the Chief Executive election, while Albert Cheng was seen as Tsang's friend in the Legislative Council. Tsang also appointed some members from the pan-democracy camp to the government positions, including Lau Sai-leung to the Central Policy Unit which drew the criticism from the traditional Beijing-loyalists. On 30 August 2005, Tsang announced that the Guangdong Provincial Government invited all 60 members from the legislative council to visit Guangdong between 25 and 26 September 2005. This was the first chance for most of the pro-democrats such as Martin Lee to visit the mainland China since 1989.

The Tsang administration's relationship with the pan-democrats deteriorated after the pro-democrats' rejection of the constitutional reform package in December 2005. Bounded by the decision by the National People's Congress Standing Committee in 2004 which ruled out the 2007/2008 Chief Executive and Legislative Council universal suffrage, the Tsang administration put forward a reform package which would expand the 800-member Election Committee to 1,600 members and add 10 seats to the 2008 Legislative Council, with five directly elected through geographical constituencies and five functional constituencies elected by District Councillors. The government claimed that this was the best deal they could muster given the constraints of the NPCSC verdict. The proposal failed to gain two-thirds majority of the Legislative Council with four votes short, as 24 pan-democrats vetoed it. He angered democrats, who voted down his proposals, when he referred to them as "horrid animals".

==== Action Blue Sky Campaign ====
In mid-2006 Tsang launched the "Action Blue Sky Campaign" and outlined a comprehensive plan to tackle air pollution in Hong Kong and in collaboration with the neighbouring Guangdong. Scepticism however remained among the expatriate and local population of Hong Kong and, in late November 2006, they ridiculed Tsang for citing the long life expectancy of Hong Kong residents as evidence of Hong Kong's high quality of life relative to other major cities in the East Asian region.

=== 2007 re-election ===
Tsang announced he would seek for the second term on 1 February 2007 with the campaign slogan "I'll get the job done". He submitted his nomination on 16 February, with 641 of the 796 Election Committee members nominated him which guaranteed his electoral victory before the polling day. He faced challenge from the pan-democrats who backed Civic Party legislator Alan Leong to run against him.

Tsang was elected by the 796-member Election Committee on 25 March 2007 with 649 votes, compared to Leong's 123 votes. It was seen as the first competitive Chief Executive election featuring two candidates from different political camp with debates held between the candidates which changed Hong Kong's political culture.

=== Second term (2007–12) ===
==== Five-year policy blueprint ====
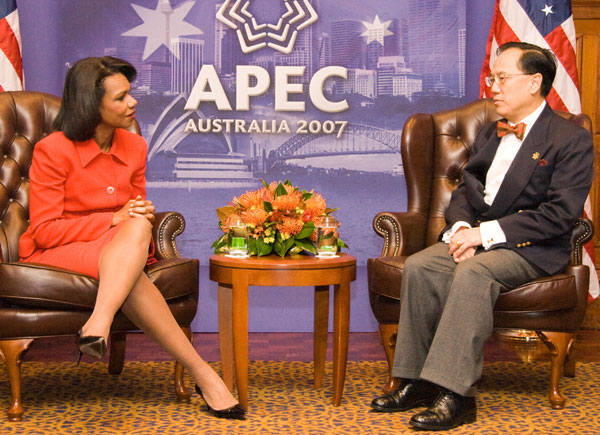
Donald Tsang meeting with US Secretary of State Condoleezza Rice at the APEC Australia 2007.

Following his re-election as the Chief Executive in 2007, Tsang set out the 5-year blueprint for the third term of the SAR government in his 2007–08 policy address. He stressed the importance of "progressive development", a core element of which is the promotion of community development through revitalisation of the built heritage in the city which is to be realised by promoting economic development through infrastructure projects. Ten large-scale infrastructure projects were also proposed within his term of office to boost economic activities to improve the living environment in Hong Kong: (1) MTR Southern District Extension; (2) MTR Sha Tin to Central Link; (3) Tuen Mun Western Bypass and Tuen Mun–Chek Lap Kok Link; (4) Guangzhou–Shenzhen–Hong Kong Express Rail Link; (5) Hong Kong–Zhuhai–Macau Bridge; (6) Hong Kong-Shenzhen Airport Co-operation; (7) Hong Kong-Shenzhen Joint Development of the Lok Ma Chau Loop; (8) West Kowloon Cultural District; (9) Kai Tak Development Plan; and (10) New Development Areas at Kwu Tung North, Fanling North, Ping Che and Ta Kwu Ling and Hung Shui Kiu.

==== Heritage conservation ====
The Tsang administration embattled with the conservation movement which reach its peak in the late 2000s, including the protests against the demolitions of the Star Ferry Pier and the Queen's Pier. In response to it, Tsang set up a Commissioner for Heritage Office and earmarked $1 billion to revitalise historic buildings. He also proposed a series of revitalisation projects that would add a new dimension to Central. For instance, to reduce the development density of the Central Ferry Piers site and open up the public space along the waterfront for entertainment, recreational and cultural uses; to remove the Central Market from the Application List and hand it over to the Urban Renewal Authority for conservation and revitalisation; and to convert the Murray Building into a hotel through open tender etc.

==== Political Appointments System ====
In 2008, the Tsang administration introduced the Political Appointments System, by superseding the Principal Officials Accountability System (POAS) and inserting two layers of politically appointed officials below the secretaries, who are political appointees. The appointees' foreign nationalities, experience and remuneration levels, and transparency of the selection process were widely criticism by the public, which led to Tsang to offer a public apology, saying: "With hindsight, I admit the arrangements in this regard did not fully meet public expectations, and I apologise for the controversy this has caused." The controversy became the turning point of the popularity of the Tsang government. A poll showed Tsang's popularity declining sharply following the three-week row over the introduction of the Political Appointments System; his disapproval rating rose from 18% to a record 24%, while his approval rating declined from 66% to 60.8% in the space of three weeks. His approval/disapproval rating continued to deteriorate, and stood at 39/41% as at late August 2008.

==== Great Recession ====
After Great Recession led to a steep rise in unemployment especially among the banking and finance industries, Tsang announced on 8 December 2008 to create 60,000 jobs in 2009 by speeding up infrastructure projects and a ten-fold increase in its loan guarantee scheme for small and medium-sized enterprises. The Tsang government also quickly formed a Task Force on Economic Challenges to deal with the recession. Tsang came up with six economic sectors to explore with the recommendations of the Task Force in his 2009–10 policy address: (1) testing and certification, (2) medical services, (3) innovation and technology, (4) cultural and creative industries, (5) environmental industry, and (6) educational services. The government pledged to provide more concrete support in those sectors and called them as the "new economic pillars". After a year of negative record of GDP growth rate, the Hong Kong economy recovered quickly from 2010, despite the poverty population keep growing under Tsang tenure.

==== Guangzhou-Shenzhen-Hong Kong Express Rail Link ====
In 2009, the government proposal of the Guangzhou-Shenzhen-Hong Kong Express Rail Link Hong Kong section sparked concerns over the significant cost escalations compared to estimates made one year previously, the conservation of the Choi Yuen village and the increasing Mainland–Hong Kong integration. The government's plan drew more than 10,000 people protesting against the construction of the rail link in late 2009 and early 2010. Despite the controversy and strong opposition from the community, the Executive Council approved the implementation on 20 October 2009. Appropriations for the project of $64 billion were passed by the Legislative Council on 16 January 2010 with the objections of the pro-democracy legislators.

==== 2012 constitutional reform ====
The Tsang administration launched the proposals for electoral reform for the 2012 Chief Executive and Legislative Council elections in November 2009 which largely similar to the 2005 proposals. To oppose the proposal, five pan-democrat legislators resigned from the Legislative Council to trigger a territory-wide by-election in which they campaigned as the "Five Constituencies Referendum" for universal suffrage and the abolition of the functional constituencies.

Following the by-election, the government stepped up efforts to gain support for the reform package. It commissioned two television advertisements which emphasised the need to move forwards with democratisation. Tsang began to campaign via radio interviews, and he and his ministers took to the streets to mobilise support. On the weekend of 29/30 May, Tsang and his ministers toured Hong Kong on an unpublicised itinerary to deliver flyers and meet the public. Tsang described as "myths" which surrounded the proposals – that it is regressive, it makes little difference whether it is passed or not, and that ordinary people are not concerned by political developments. He said they were "the first step as well as the last opportunity" to lay the foundation for a chief executive elected by universal suffrage in 2017. He expressed his fear that "a mood of pessimism and cynicism will take root" if there was no progress this time. Tsang also invited Audrey Eu of the Civic Party, the spokesperson of the "Five Constituencies Referendum" to a one-hour televised debate on 17 June. Pundits were unanimous that Eu had trounced Tsang in the debate, with the University of Hong Kong poll showed that 45% of people were "more opposed" to the government's proposals after the debate, while 20% said they were more supportive.

The central government made a U-turn on the moderate democrats' modified proposal tabled by the Democratic Party on 19 June, after South China Morning Post (SCMP) revealed that Donald Tsang had written a letter the previous week to Xi Jinping, vice-president in charge of Hong Kong affairs. "The chief executive warned in the letter that Hong Kong could face a serious governance crisis if the electoral reform package was vetoed by Legco again, and his ability to govern Hong Kong effectively would be in doubt". The SCMP source said Chinese Communist Party general secretary Hu Jintao personally approved the Democratic Party's proposals. With the moderate democrats' support, the proposals were approved by the Legislative Council, making it the first and only electoral reform to be passed in the SAR history.

==== Minimum Wage legislation ====
Facing the increasing disparity between rich and poor in his term, Tsang set up a Minimum Wage Provisional Commission in February 2009 to research and eventually set a proposed wage floor. The Minimum Wage Bill was passed on 15 July 2010 and a HK$28 (~US$3.60) per hour rate was recommended by the Provisional Minimum Wage Commission and adopted by the Chief Executive-in-Council on 10 November 2010.

==== Corruption allegations ====
In the last months of his tenure, Tsang was embroiled in a series of corruption allegations. In February 2012 during the Chief Executive election in which contender Henry Tang, the former Chief Secretary in Tsang's government suffered in wide range of scandals, Tsang was also discovered by the Oriental Daily News to have received favours and hospitality from business tycoons on various occasions, including private jet and yacht trips and was labelled as "Greedy Tsang".

The allegations of preferential allocation of a luxury three-storey penthouse in Shenzhen surfaced after Tsang addressed the press by saying that he and his wife had chosen to live in Shenzhen for a period after his retirement as they wanted to stay away from the limelight. Tsang was accused for allocating the Shenzhen penthouse owned by Bill Wong Cho-bau to Tsang in exchange for granting of a broadcasting licence to the Wong's Digital Broadcasting Corporation (DBC, then Wave Media). It was reported that Tsang was set to rent the flat at a substantially discounted rate while renovation works, provided by the developer, were tailored to the demands of Tsang's wife. Tsang argued that declaration was not necessary and that his lease did not affect the government's decision on granting the broadcasting licence to DBC. He also argued that the lease was at market value.

Tsang was later summoned to answer questions from an open inquiry by the Legislative Council. This unprecedented revelations and move to impeach him launched by a pro-Beijing legislator Paul Tse shook the confidence in integrity of the city's officials. Tsang also set up an Independent Review Committee for the Prevention and Handling of Potential Conflicts of Interests chaired by former Chief Justice of the Court of Final Appeal Andrew Li on 26 February 2012 to review the existing frameworks and procedures for preventing and handling of potential conflicts of interests concerning the Chief Executive and other top officials.

In the last month of his office, Tsang fought back tears as he offered "sincere apologies" on 1 June, when he said: "I know that my mishandling of the various events has undermined the community's confidence in the integrity of the system and has disappointed my colleagues in the civil service. For this I would like to, once again, offer my sincere apologies." He stepped down as the Chief Executive on 30 June 2012 under the cloud of an investigation by the Independent Commission Against Corruption (ICAC). Compared to his predecessor Tung Chee-hwa who was appointed vice-chairman of the Chinese People's Political Consultative Conference (CPPCC) after stepping down as Chief Executive, Tsang was not appointed any position by the central government after his retirement.

== Conviction, imprisonment, and acquittal ==
On 5 October 2015, Tsang was charged with two counts of misconduct in public office after failing to disclose plans to rent a luxury penthouse for his retirement from Bill Wong Cho-bau applying for a broadcasting licence for the Digital Broadcasting Corporation (then Wave Media) by the Independent Commission Against Corruption (ICAC), as well as failing to declare renowned interior designer Barrie Ho Chow-lai's engagement for decorating the penthouse when he recommended to the relevant government committee that Ho should receive an honour. An extra count of accepting an advantage from an agent for violating the Prevention of Bribery Ordinance over the Shenzhen penthouse was added on 11 October 2016.

After entering pleas of not guilty to all charges, his trial began before a jury on 10 January 2017. On 17 February 2017, the jury found Tsang guilty on one charge of misconduct in public office over the penthouse rental and not guilty on the misconduct charge for the penthouse decoration, but failed to reach a verdict on the count of accepting an advantage from an agent. He was sentenced to a 20-month imprisonment on 22 February 2017. When he announced Tsang's sentence, Mr Justice Andrew Chan Hing-wai said "never in my judicial career have I seen a man fallen from so high."

On 24 April, Tsang granted bail by court after his health was fluctuating and had to be sent to the Queen Mary Hospital. Regarding the charge which had a guilty verdict, Tsang gets bail pending appeal. Regarding the charge which "failed to reach a verdict", a retrial was carried out, and the Judge dismissed the retrial-jury on 3 November 2017 after they too were unable to reach a verdict. Prosecution has not applied for a third trial.

On 11 January 2019, Tsang was admitted to hospital for health reasons, a few days ahead of his scheduled release from prison. On 15 January, Tsang was released from hospital and also from jail. Upon his release, Tsang refused to compare his case with that of his successor Leung Chun-ying, who was also accused of corruption for his recipient of HK$50 million from Australian firm UGL without disclosure, even though Leung's case was dropped by the government in a controversial manner. "If I make comparisons, it may revive my anger and hatred in my heart. I have cleared these through working hard to pray and receive blessings from the heavens a few months ago," Tsang said. He also said he would persist in seeking justice and clear his name.

On 26 June 2019, the Court of Final Appeal unanimously quashed his conviction and sentence, after finding that the trial judge had failed to direct his jurors properly. The Court found that the trial court trial did not adequately instruct the jury on required elements of the crime. Since Tsang was not convicted for bribery, the elements of "wilfulness" and "seriousness" in the misconduct in public office charge became especially important, and an adequate explanation was not given to the jury. The Court also decided that the interests of justice did not require a new trial.

As a result of his successful appeal, Tsang should be able to reclaim some of the estimated HK$40 to 50 million of legal costs over two trials and two appeals. Tsang had said he and his wife spent almost all their savings on the lawsuit. But Tsang is unlikely to reclaim his costs fully, including the initial trial and legal costs related to his investigation. Another outcome of the appeal is that Tsang's entitlement to HK$80,000 a month in civil servants' pension will no longer be in jeopardy. Retired Hong Kong civil servants could lose all or part of their pension if they were convicted of an offence related to their office, subject to the chief executive's approval.

== Personal life ==
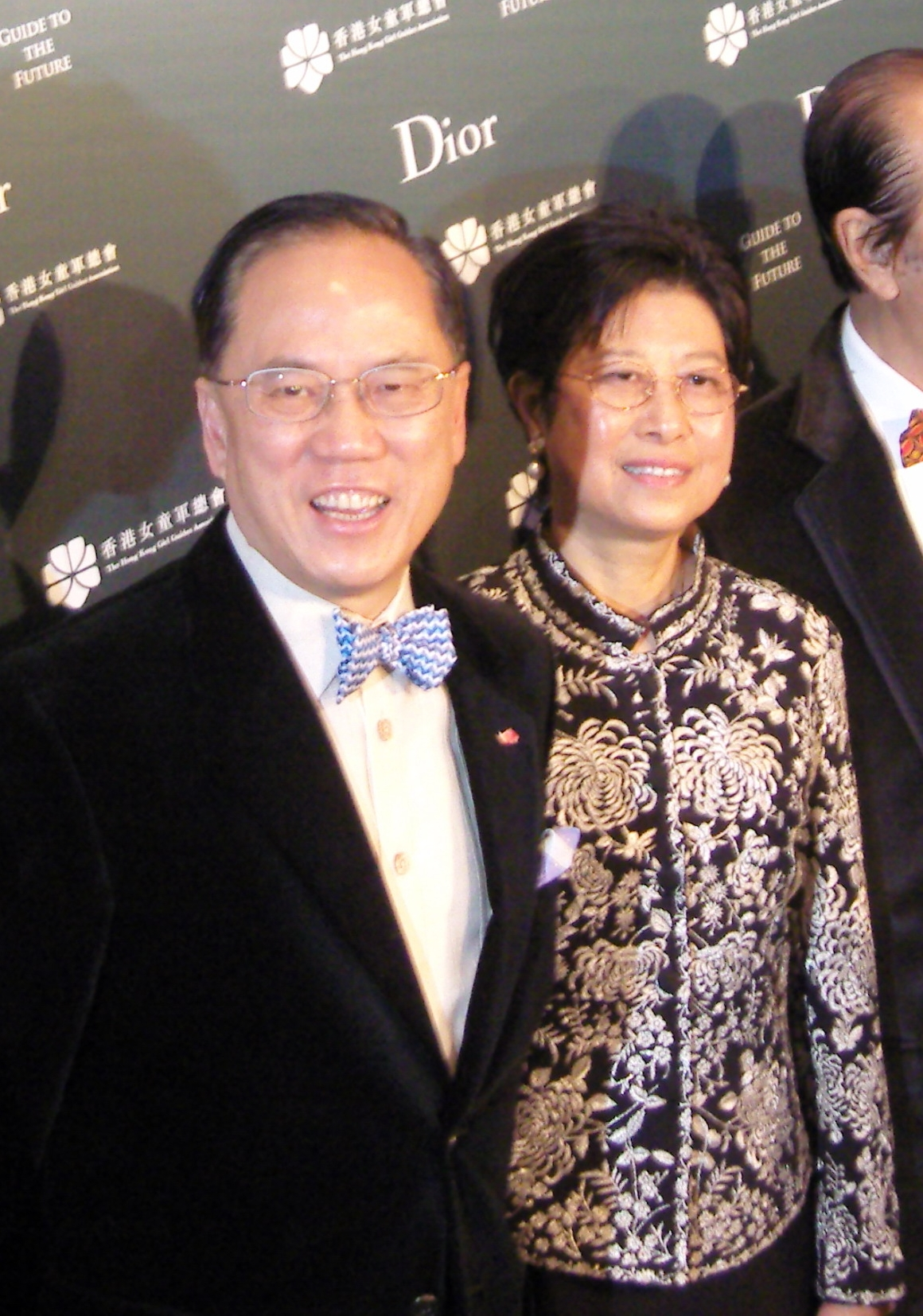
Donald Tsang and his wife, Selina, Lady Tsang, in 2008.

Tsang is the eldest of the five sons and one daughter. His younger brother Tsang Yam-pui, retired as the Police Commissioner in December 2003, after a career with the police in which he worked his way up to the top job from the rank of Probationary Inspector. His younger sister Katherine Tsang is chairperson of Standard Chartered Hong Kong. He married Selina Pou Siu-mei in 1969 and has two sons, Simon Tsang Hing-yin and Thomas Tsang Hing-shun.

Tsang is a devout Roman Catholic and goes to Mass every morning, though his political viewpoints were bluntly criticised at times by Joseph Cardinal Zen, who was the Bishop of Hong Kong during Tsang's term as Chief Executive.

Tsang is well known for his preference of wearing bow-ties. According to Associated Press, "the bow tie is such an integral part of Tsang's identity that he is nicknamed "Bow-tie Tsang". His nickname is widely known among Hong Kong people. According to a television interview, this preference started somewhere between 1988 and 1993, when Tsang's office was adjacent to Deputy Political Adviser Stephen Bradley, who himself wore bow-ties. Tsang felt comfortable with a bow-tie Bradley gave him, saying that its design brings fewer hurdles to its wearer than a necktie.

Tsang is well known for keeping koi. He had a pond built for them in the garden of his official residence, Government House, at a cost of HK$300,000. His other hobbies include swimming, bird-watching and hiking.

== See also ==
- Politics of Hong Kong
- List of bow tie wearers
- List of heads of regimes who were later imprisoned

Government offices
Preceded by Yeung Kai-yin	Secretary for the Treasury; 1993–1995	Succeeded by Kwong Ki-chi
Preceded by Hamish Macleod	Financial Secretary of Hong Kong; 1995–2001	Succeeded by Antony Leung
Political offices
Preceded by Anson Chan	Chief Secretary for Administration; 2001–2005	Succeeded by Rafael Hui
Preceded by Tung Chee-hwa	Chief Executive of Hong Kong; 2005–2012	Succeeded by Leung Chun-ying
Preceded by Tung Chee-hwa	President of Executive Council; 2005–2012	Succeeded by Leung Chun-ying
Order of precedence
Preceded by Geoffrey Ma; Chief Justice of the Court of Final Appeal	Hong Kong order of precedence Former Chief Executives	Succeeded by Leung Chun-ying; Former Chief Executives
